= Mayflower Pictures =

British film production company

- Mayflower Pictures' logos, as they appear in the closing screen credits of St. Martin's Lane (top), Jamaica Inn (middle), and Cairo Road (bottom)
- Trade name: The Mayflower Pictures Corporation, Limited
- Type: Privately held company
- Industry: Entertainment industry; Film industry
- Founded: 25 January 1937 in London, England, U.K.
- Founders: Charles Laughton; Erich Pommer
- Defunct: 25 January 1940
- Headquarters: Chancery Lane, London, United Kingdom
- Key people: John Maxwell; George H. Brown; Maxwell Setton; Aubrey Baring; Robert Westerby
- Products: Motion pictures

Mayflower Pictures (legally The Mayflower Pictures Corporation, Limited and usually referred to simply as "Mayflower" by its producers) was a British film production company formed by producer Erich Pommer and actor Charles Laughton. It was active from 1936 to 1940, during which time it produced three films, all starring Laughton: Vessel of Wrath (1938), a comedy directed by Pommer co-starring Laughton's wife Elsa Lanchester and Robert Newton; St. Martin's Lane (1938), a comedy drama directed by Tim Whelan co-starring Vivien Leigh and Rex Harrison; and Jamaica Inn (1939), an adventure thriller directed by Alfred Hitchcock co-starring Maureen O'Hara and Robert Newton. Its films were mostly lensed at Elstree Studios with little on-location shooting, and were distributed in the United Kingdom by Associated British Picture Corporation and in the rest of the world by Paramount Pictures.

The company was noted for seeking top talent in the industry to work on its films and produced what was considered at the time major motion pictures in the British film industry. In 1938, it was described by the Evening Chronicle as "Potentially the most important unit working in this country." With the outbreak of World War II in Europe in 1939, Laughton and Pommer attempted to move Mayflower Pictures to Hollywood, with bidding offers coming from Paramount Pictures and RKO Radio Pictures. The pair instead signed individual contracts with RKO Radio Pictures and put the company on an indefinite hiatus, eventually dissolving it in 1940.

In 1949, Maxwell Setton and Aubrey Baring relaunched the company after purchasing Laughton and Pommer's remaining interests. Under their ownership, Mayflower Pictures produced seven more films: The Spider and the Fly (1949), a crime drama directed by Robert Hamer starring Eric Portman, Guy Rolfe, and Nadia Gray; Cairo Road (1950), an adventure crime drama directed by David MacDonald starring Portman, Laurence Harvey, and Maria Mauban; The Adventurers (1951), an adventure directed by MacDonald starring Dennis Price, Jack Hawkins, and Siobhán McKenna; So Little Time (1952), a romantic drama directed by Compton Bennett starring Marius Goring and Maria Schell; Appointment in London (1953), a war drama directed by Philip Leacock starring Dirk Bogarde, Ian Hunter, Dinah Sheridan, and William Sylvester; South of Algiers (1953), an adventure directed by Jack Lee starring Van Heflin, Wanda Hendrix, and Portman; and They Who Dare (1954), a war drama directed by Lewis Milestone starring Bogarde, Denholm Elliott, and Akim Tamiroff. All but So Little Time were written by Robert Westerby.

Unlike the first series of films made in the 1930s, the new wave of productions was mostly filmed on location, with occasional shooting at Pinewood Studios, Shepperton Studios, and Elstree Studios. Its films were distributed variously in the United Kingdom by General Film Distributors, Associated British-Pathé, and British Lion Films, while in the United States and Canada, each film had a different distribution deal with Universal-International Pictures, Realart Pictures, Lippert Pictures, Associated Artists Productions, United Artists, and Allied Artists Pictures. This iteration of the company closed down in 1954.

== History ==
=== The new company (1936–1937) ===
The Mayflower Pictures Corporation, Limited (named after the famous ship) was formed in December 1936, and registered as a new company in London on 25 January 1937, by German-born film producer Erich Pommer and British actor Charles Laughton. The pair were then major stars in the British film industry and planned to make motion pictures that had mass audience appeal to both the British and American market, seeking top names in the business to work on their productions. Laughton turned down several offers to appear in American films to focus on his new film production company. Laughton and Pommer each held joint managing director positions in the company.

In late February 1937, Pommer and Laughton invited American film director William K. Howard to discuss his directing Mayflower Pictures' first film. The trio was looking for a suitable story, likely to star Laughton and announced they would not start production until three films had been fully scripted. They hired Clemence Dane and Sir Hugh Walpole to write for them, and eventually brought over one of Hollywood's top-paid playwright/screenwriter, former American actor Bartlett Cormack, to work on and develop several scripts for the company. Meanwhile, Laughton was busy with the filming of I, Claudius for Alexander Korda's London Films, but planned to turn his focus exclusively to Mayflower Pictures once production wrapped, or in this case, his contract expired, since the film had been halted.

In late June 1937, Laughton announced that he would star in, and that Pommer would produce, three films for Mayflower Pictures for a total cost of £250,000, or, at most, £100,000 per picture: Vessel of Wrath, St. Martin's Lane, and Jamaica Inn. It was reported that at least one of the three films was to be made in color; Jamaica Inn was later revealed to have originally intended to be filmed in Technicolor. In early July 1937, British film producer John Maxwell, who ran Elstree Studios, Associated British Picture Corporation, and Associated British Cinemas, became a financial partner in Mayflower Pictures by buying a substantial interest in shares in the company. Maxwell's role in the firm, and as chairman of the board, was to guarantee financing and distribution of the films in the British Isles (via Associated British Picture Corporation) and North America, though Laughton told American reporters that same month that the company was having difficulty securing an American distributor. Through Maxwell, the company also secured the use of Elstree Studios for its productions. Laughton told reporters in July 1937 that he wished to retire from acting within two years and focus solely on producing films.

The first film to go into production was a comedy based on the 1931 short story "The Vessel of Wrath" by W. Somerset Maugham, and was initially to be directed by Cormack, who also wrote the screenplay. The picture's working title was Hot Heaven. Laughton cast his wife, Elsa Lanchester, to co-star in the picture, along with a supporting actors like Robert Newton (who had worked with Laughton on the shelved I, Claudius, as well as in two pictures for Pommer) and Tyrone Guthrie. Filming was done mainly at Elstree Studios, but also on the Cote D'azur in France, with Pommer taking over as director. The film was noted for including the longest single take for a scene on a talkie film at the time, one that lasted four and a half minutes (at a time when average scenes lasted at most thirty seconds).

By October 1937, a fourth film had been added into the company's future schedule, based on an original idea by Cormack about a newspaper man and the rise, fall, and closing of London newspaper The Morning Post. It was to star Laughton and be directed by Pommer. Pommer described the synopsis as "Laughton will be seen as the son of a newspaper man on a historic Fleet-street journal, steeped in the traditions of journalism and born into the newspaper business. Inevitably, like all members of his family, he goes into Fleet-street, and the story will trace his rise from his arrival on the paper up through various stages, until he finally becomes editor. With changing times and the consequent change in ideas, the historic old paper eventually closes down, ending a long and glorious history, with the final scene, perhaps, showing Laughton rising from desk, as the last edition goes out, to carefully setting his silk hat on his old head, passing through the outer office, and murmuring 'Good-night gentlemen,' he finally walks out of the office and the paper he has loved, just as he has walked out every evening for the last fifty years." The film was never made.

Vessel of Wrath premiered on 24 February 1938 at the Regal Theatre in London, but the press predicted a limited turnout as it was held the same night as the British premiere of Walt Disney Productions' Snow White and the Seven Dwarfs (ironically, Laughton had attended the latter film's American premiere in December 1937). Laughton later toured England and Europe to promote the film at its various local openings. The film received mixed reviews by critics, with some praising it as one of the finest films of the year. In August 1938, it was announced that Vessel of Wrath would be distributed in the United States and Canada by Paramount Pictures, but under the alternative title The Beachcomber. It had its American premiere at the Rivoli Theatre in New York on 24 December 1938, and its Canadian premiere at the Princess Theatre in Montreal on 13 January 1939; both were attended by Lanchester. The film was put into general North American release on 10 March 1939.

=== Rise in importance (1937–1939) ===
The second picture for the company, St. Martin's Lane, was an original story by Clemence Dane dealing with the West End, written especially for Laughton and Mayflower Pictures. Cormack, Laughton, and Pommer each contributed to the screenplay. In February 1938, after months of negotiations, Pommer managed to borrow Vivien Leigh from Alexander Korda's London Films to co-star in the film; Leigh had appeared in Pommer's production of Fire Over England two years prior. The producers also brought in American-born (but British resident) film director Tim Whelan for the picture; Whelan had directed Farewell Again for Pommer the year prior. St. Martin's Lane was reported in the press as having hired the most actors and extras for any British picture at the time, including 3,000 extras, 200 chorus girls, and over 50 starring, co-starring, supporting, or featured players. Among the most notable cast of co-stars included Rex Harrison, Larry Adler, and Tyrone Guthrie (in his last film before returning to America); Cormack was also given a small part.

Sparing no expense, Elstree Studios reported it had built one of the largest sets ever erected for a British picture at the time, using up every inch of the studio space, notably for a reproduction of the exterior of the Holborn Empire Theatre. Whelan intentionally shot alternate scenes and dialogue for the film, ones for its British release and others for its American release, so that certain slang and common words would be understood in each market. After filming wrapped at Elstree Studios, the film was previewed on 22 June 1938, at the Astoria Theatre in Folkestone during a film industry conference; from the public, press, and trade members' reaction, the producers re-cut the film before releasing it to the general public. It was also previewed by Pommer in America when he visited the country in July–19 August 1938, where he secured the distribution rights for the company's first two pictures, and met with agents, writers, and actors for Mayflower Pictures' next three pictures that were to be filmed over the following fifteen months. Although Paramount Pictures agreed to release Vessel of Wrath, they insisted that St. Martin's Lane be re-cut for the American public. St. Martin's Lane had its world premiere on 19 October 1938, at the Carlton Theatre in London; adding to the prestige of the event was that it was the first televised film premiere.

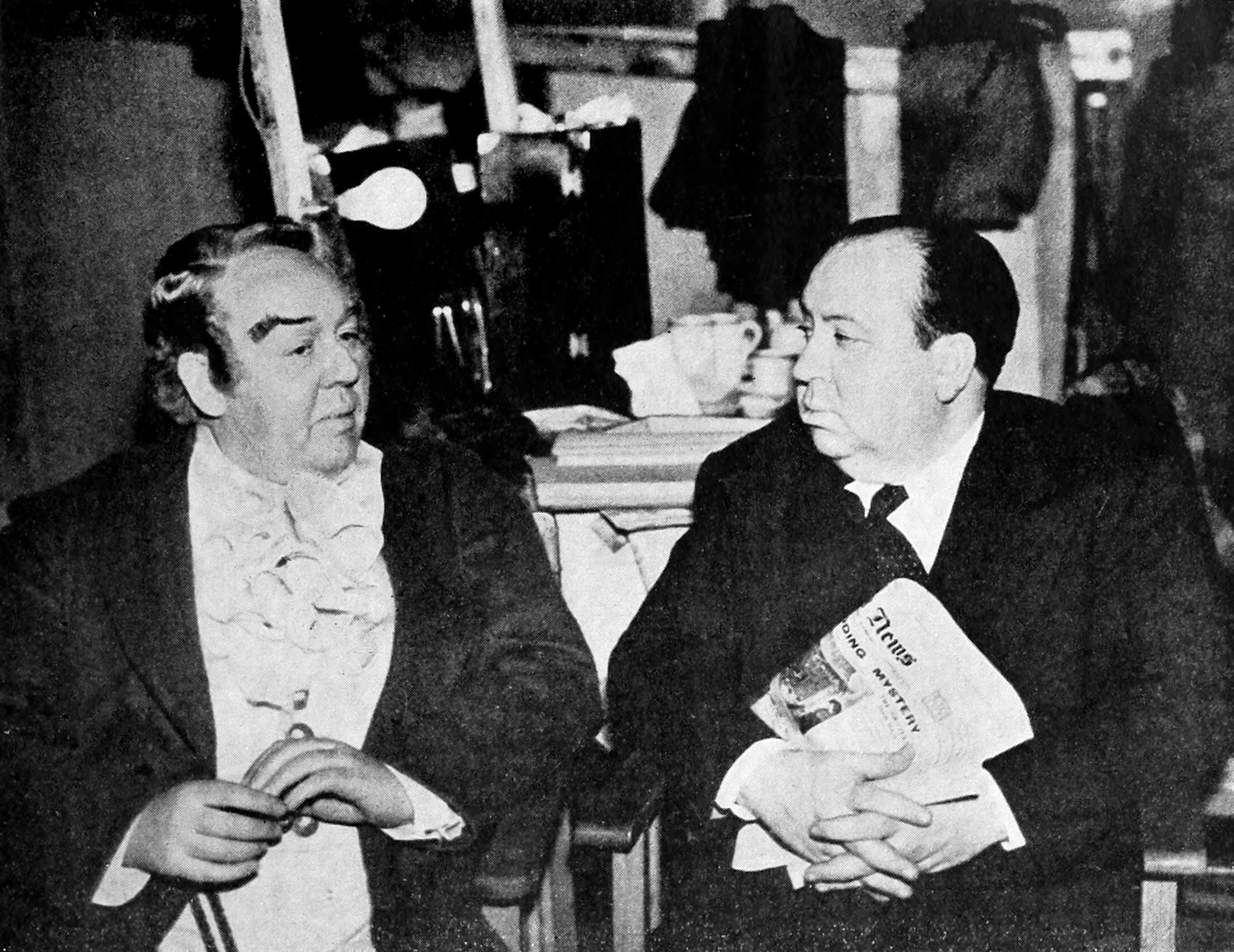
Laughton and Hitchcock at Elstree Studios during the filming of Jamaica Inn

Mayflower Pictures' third movie was based on Daphne du Maurier's 1936 novel, Jamaica Inn, and was first adapted for the screen by Sir Hugh Walpole. Laughton personally invested the majority of his life savings in the production. In May 1938, Alfred Hitchcock signed on to direct the picture, but would only begin work on it after returning from his first trip to America in June 1938. Hitchcock brought in a new team of writers to work on the script, including Sidney Gilliat, Joan Harrison, J. B. Priestley, and his wife Alma Reville. The movie was set and partly filmed in Cornwall, though most of the shooting took place at Elstree Studios, where the weather did not hinder the production.

Although Laughton's wardrobe for Mayflower Pictures' first two films combined only amounted to £6, his costumes in Jamaica Inn cost an extravagant £600; the film itself was reported by the press as "the most expensive film yet made by Mayflower Pictures." The picture marked the starring debut of Irish actress Maureen O'Hara, who was put under contract to Mayflower Pictures and groomed as a starlet for a year before the picture began. The film also co-starred Robert Newton, Leslie Banks, Marie Ney, and Horace Hodges. Jamaica Inn premiered on 12 May 1939, at the Regal Theatre in London. It was deemed the company's "best picture yet" upon release.

In early March 1939, following the success of The Beachcomber's release in the United States and Canada, Pommer traveled to New York where Mayflower Pictures signed a contract with Paramount Film Service for the latter to have exclusive worldwide distribution (except for the United Kingdom) of four of the company's films. In addition to the already-completed Vessel of Wrath (which had been released by Paramount Pictures in the United States and Canada in December 1938) and St. Martin's Lane (still unreleased abroad), the deal gave distribution security to the then-filming Jamaica Inn and to the company's next planned property, an adaptation of The Admirable Crichton, set to star Laughton, Lanchester, and O'Hara.

=== Move to Hollywood (1939–1940) ===
On 10 May 1939, Pommer sailed aboard the SS Normandie for the United States, where he met with Paramount Pictures executives, Budd Rogers and Neil F. Agnew. The two were appointed positions within The Mayflower Pictures Corporation, Agnew as vice-president and sales manager, and Rogers as American representative. The goal of the meeting was to attend the Paramount sales convention in Los Angeles in early June 1939 and discuss the general release of St. Martin's Lane and Jamaica Inn as part of Paramount Pictures' 1939–40 program. He also discussed his desire to extend Paramount Pictures' relation with Mayflower Pictures for two years, during which he would produce five additional films after completing The Admirable Crichton. Pommer returned to England on RMS Queen Mary on 21 June 1939.

In June 1939, Laughton, Lanchester, and O'Hara traveled to America aboard the RMS Queen Mary. The purpose of the trip was multifold. For one, they were going to attend the New York premiere of Jamaica Inn; secondly, Pommer and Laughton were to discuss business regarding The Admirable Crichton with Paramount Picture executives; and third, Laughton and O'Hara had been cast in a remake of The Hunchback of Notre Dame for RKO Radio Pictures, which began filming in July and lasted until October 1939. The night before leaving for America, O'Hara married Mayflower Pictures' assistant production manager George H. Brown.

Laughton and Pommer announced in June 1939, that they, along with O'Hara and Lanchester, would return to England immediately after The Hunchback of Notre Dame wrapped up to start production on Mayflower Pictures' fourth film, The Admirable Crichton, based on Sir James M. Barrie's play. Laughton was to play the title role of Crichton, Lanchester was to play the role of the barmaid Tweeny, and O'Hara was to take the role of Lady Mary Lasenby. The picture was scheduled to be directed by David MacDonald and be filmed before the end of the year for an early 1940 release. However, World War II broke out in September 1939. Although Laughton originally had every intention of resuming his British film career after his one-off film for RKO Radio Pictures, most British subjects were reluctant to return to a country at war, especially when film production there had been put on hold. Furthermore, as a German passport holder, Pommer was unable to return to England.

In early October 1939, Pommer met with RKO Radio Pictures president George J. Schaefer to discuss a deal wherein Mayflower Pictures would shift its productions to Hollywood, under the financial and distribution aegis of the former company. Two pictures were being pitched, including The Admirable Crichton. Although Jamaica Inn had initially been scheduled for a North American release in August 1939, then pushed back to "around Labor Day," it only hit American and Canadian screens on 13 October 1939; it was an immediate hit. Columnist Louella Parsons reported later in October 1939, that Paramount Pictures and RKO Radio Pictures were both bidding for Mayflower Pictures to move to their unit, not only for the prestige of having a team of successful filmmakers on their lots but also because it could transfer over O'Hara's (promoted as "Hollywood's find of the year") exclusive contract. Laughton had planned to tour the United States and Canada in promotion of Jamaica Inn in October 1939, but was forced to cancel due to an ear ailment.

In mid-November 1939, Laughton, Pommer, and O'Hara each signed individual contracts with RKO Radio Pictures, putting Mayflower Pictures on an indefinite hiatus. Although the trio never worked on a film together again, several films made for RKO Radio Pictures in the early 1940s had connections to Mayflower Pictures: O'Hara first appeared in A Bill of Divorcement (1940), which was adapted from a Clemence Dane story; Dance, Girl, Dance (1940) starred O'Hara and was produced by Pommer (who also worked on the story); and Laughton was signed on to appear in They Knew What They Wanted (1940), which was originally to be produced and directed by Leo McCarey but was taken over by director Garson Kanin and Pommer came on as producer. Pommer was also keen on doing a biographical picture about Dr. Samuel Johnson with Laughton in the role, a project he had been pitching to the actor for two years, but the latter was adamant that he never had any interest in playing that role. Laughton and Pommer were also to be reunited for a 1940 RKO Radio Pictures film titled Half a Rogue, based on an original story by Garrett Fort and with a screenplay by Louis Bromfield, but the film was never made. Laughton and O'Hara later appeared together in This Land Is Mine (1943).

The Mayflower Pictures Corporation, Limited filled for dissolution in England exactly three years to the day after it was registered, on 25 January 1940, in King's Bench Division. St. Martin's Lane was delayed from its intended mid-1939 North American release date, as by that time, Leigh had been cast in the major Hollywood film for David O. Selznick, Gone with the Wind, which was then filming and gave the former picture a great boost in publicity and public interest from Leigh's increased stardom. A similar situation occurred later that year when Laughton was cast in The Hunchback of Notre Dame, which was eventually released around the same time as Gone with the Wind in December 1939. Laughton and Leigh's increased exposure in North America led the picture to be delayed until February 1940, when it fully benefited from the other two films' exposure. While awaiting its release, the picture went through several title changes, starting with London by Night, then London After Dark, then Partners in the Night, and finally Sidewalks of London. When the film held a special studio previewed at the Village Theatre in Los Angeles on 19 January 1940, Leigh was unable to attend so the producers hired actress Jean O'Donnell, a perfect double for the star, to impersonate her so that fans would not be disappointed.

Throughout March and April 1940, newspapers continued reporting that Mayflower Pictures would resume production of films via RKO Radio Pictures. Pommer told the press during a trip to New York in April 1940, that neither he nor Laughton would be returning to England, but that he was meeting with RKO Radio Pictures president George J. Schaefer to detail Mayflower Pictures' foreign plans in which the company would produce low-budget films in England within a few weeks, which RKO Radio Pictures would release in America, in order to stay active. These plans never materialized.

=== Reissues and reformation (1949–1956) ===
In January 1949, Paramount Pictures sold their distribution rights for The Beachcomber, Jamaica Inn, and Sidewalks of London to the British company Verity Films for re-release. The films were distributed theatrically in the United States and Canada for three years, between January 1949 and December 1951.

In June 1949, it was announced that barrister Maxwell Setton, a former employee of Laughton and Mayflower Pictures, and his associate, film producer Aubrey Baring, bought out the company's remaining interests from Laughton and Pommer, though by this time, their first production, The Spider and the Fly, was already halfway filmed.

The pair made seven films before the company was dissolved. The company initially borrowed money from Rank or ABPC. In December 1951 Setton arranged finance from the NFFC and the Treasury Capital Issue's Committee to finance South of Algiers provided he could get a distributor guarantee. This meant Setton only had to get a guarantee from a distributor, not actually money. Setton and Baring ultimately parted ways after a differing of opinion of what films to make.

== Filmography ==
| Year | Film | Director | Producers | Starring |
|---|---|---|---|---|
| 1938 | Vessel of Wrath | Erich Pommer | Erich Pommer, Charles Laughton | Charles Laughton, Elsa Lanchester |
| 1938 | St. Martin's Lane | Tim Whelan | Erich Pommer, Charles Laughton | Charles Laughton, Vivien Leigh |
| 1939 | Jamaica Inn | Alfred Hitchcock | Erich Pommer, Charles Laughton | Charles Laughton, Maureen O'Hara |
| 1949 | The Spider and the Fly | Robert Hamer | Maxwell Setton, Aubrey Baring | Eric Portman, Guy Rolfe, Nadia Gray |
| 1950 | Cairo Road | David MacDonald | Maxwell Setton, Aubrey Baring | Eric Portman, Laurence Harvey, Maria Mauban |
| 1951 | The Adventurers | David MacDonald | Maxwell Setton, Aubrey Baring | Dennis Price, Jack Hawkins, Siobhán McKenna |
| 1952 | So Little Time | Compton Bennett | Maxwell Setton, Aubrey Baring | Marius Goring, Maria Schell |
| 1953 | Appointment in London | Philip Leacock | Maxwell Setton, Aubrey Baring | Dirk Bogarde, Ian Hunter, Dinah Sheridan, William Sylvester |
| 1953 | South of Algiers | Jack Lee | Maxwell Setton, Aubrey Baring | Van Heflin, Wanda Hendrix, Eric Portman |
| 1954 | They Who Dare | Lewis Milestone | Maxwell Setton, Aubrey Baring | Dirk Bogarde, Denholm Elliott, Akim Tamiroff |
