= Mayflower Productions =

Mayflower Productions (not to be confused with a similarly-named film company Mayflower Pictures) was a British-based film production company of the 1940s and 1950s. It was formed by Maxwell Setton and Aubrey Baring. It made seven films, mostly action stories, before the company was dissolved. The company initially borrowed money from Rank or ABPC. In December 1951 Setton arranged finance from the NFFC and the Treasury Capital Issues Committee to finance South of Algiers provided he could get a distributor guarantee. This meant Setton only had to get a guarantee from a distributor, not actual money. Setton and Baring ultimately parted ways after a differing of opinion of what films to make. Setton set up Marksman Films.

== Filmography ==
- The Spider and the Fly (1949)
- Cairo Road (1950)
- The Adventurers (1951) a.k.a. Fortune in Diamonds, The Great Adventure
- So Little Time (1952)
- Raiders in the Sky a.k.a. Appointment in London (1953)
- South of Algiers a.k.a. The Golden Mask (1953)
- They Who Dare (1954)
