= The Adventurers (1951 film) =

1951 British film by David MacDonald

- Original British 1-sheet poster
- Directed by: David MacDonald
- Written by: Robert Westerby
- Based on: story by Westerby
- Produced by: Aubrey Baring; Maxwell Setton (uncredited)
- Starring: Dennis Price; Jack Hawkins; Siobhan McKenna
- Cinematography: Oswald Morris
- Edited by: Vladimir Sagovsky
- Music by: Cedric Thorpe Davie
- Production company: Mayflower Productions
- Distributed by: General Film Distributors
- Release date: 7 March 1951 (London)
- Running time: 86 minutes
- Country: United Kingdom
- Language: English

The Adventurers is a 1951 British adventure film directed by David MacDonald and starring Dennis Price, Jack Hawkins, Peter Hammond. In the wake of the Boer War several men journey into the South African veldt in search of diamonds.

It was also known as Fortune in Diamonds, The Great Adventure and The South African Story. It was one of a series of movies made by the British film industry after World War Two which were set (and filmed) in the dominions.

== Plot ==
In 1902, at the end of the Boer War, a South African soldier, Pieter Brandt, hides a cache of diamonds he finds on a body. He returns to the town he left three years earlier where his girl, Anne, has married a disgraced English officer, Clive Hunter.

Needing funds to get back to pick up the diamonds. the Boer enlists the help of his former comrade, Hendrik Von Thaal, as well as Hunter and a bar owner called Dominic. The four men set off to find the diamonds but they end up betraying each other.

== Cast ==
- Dennis Price as Clive Hunter
- Jack Hawkins as Pieter Brandt
- Peter Hammond as Hendrik van Thaal
- Grégoire Aslan as Dominic
- Charles Paton as Barman
- Siobhan McKenna as Anne Hunter
- Bernard Lee as O'Connell
- Ronald Adam as Van Thaal
- Martin Boddey as Chief Engineer
- Philip Ray as Man in Restaurant
- Walter Horsbrugh as Man in Restaurant
- Cyril Chamberlain as Waiter

== Production ==
The film was based on an original story by the novelist and screenwriter Robert Westerby, one of several he wrote for the independent production company Mayflower Productions.

Jack Hawkins was borrowed from British Lion. Director David MacDonald had just made Diamond City (1949) also on location in South Africa.

It was made at Pinewood Studios, with some location filming in South Africa beforehand near Johannesburg. Production started in May 1950 and was completed by September. The film wasn't released until the following March by General Film Distributors.

== Release ==
The film was originally known as The South Africa Story. It had its world premiere aboard the Queen Mary liner. The film was cut by 12 minutes for its U.S. release, and was twice retitled, as Fortune in Diamonds and The Great Adventure.

== Critical reception ==
Allmovie noted "an African variation of Treasure of the Sierra Madre, The Adventurers is buoyed by an unusually vicious performance by Jack Hawkins"; while the Radio Times wrote, "this could have been quite stirring if it hadn't been morbidly under-directed at a snail's pace by David MacDonald"; and TV Guide found that, despite its borrowings from Sierra Madre and from von Stroheim's Greed, "it is nevertheless an often-gripping film."
