= Harold Lang (British actor) =

British character actor (1923–1970)

- Born: Harold Richard Lang; 1923; London, England
- Died: 16 November 1970 (aged 47); Cairo, Egypt
- Education: RADA
- Occupations: Actor, writer, theatre director, acting teacher

Harold Lang (1923 – 16 November 1970) was a RADA-trained British character actor of stage and screen. During the 1950s, in particular, played many sly or menacing roles in B-films. At one time he managed his own theatrical company. From 1960, Lang, a devotee of Stanislavski, also taught acting at Central School of Speech and Drama; and director John Schlesinger filmed his work in a documentary, The Class, for BBC TV's Monitor, in 1961. He died of a heart attack in Cairo, Egypt, shortly before he was due to give a lecture.

== Partial filmography ==
- The Man from Morocco (1945) – Soldier (uncredited)
- Floodtide (1949) – Mac – the draughtsman (uncredited)
- The Spider and the Fly (1949) – Belfort – The Pickpocket
- Cairo Road (1950) – Humble
- The Franchise Affair (1951) – Bus inspector
- Calling Bulldog Drummond (1951) – Stan (uncredited)
- Cloudburst (1951) – Mickie Fraser / Kid Python
- Wings of Danger (1952) – Snell, the blackmailer
- So Little Time (1952) – Lt. Seger
- It Started in Paradise (1952) – Mr. Louis
- Folly to Be Wise (1952) – Soldier in Pub (uncredited)
- The Long Memory (1953) – Boyd's Chauffeur
- The Story of Gilbert and Sullivan (1953) – Singer
- Street Corner (1953) – Len
- Laughing Anne (1953) – Jacques
- The Saint's Return (1953) – Jarvis
- The Intruder (1953) – Bill
- A Day to Remember (1953) – Stan's Accomplice (uncredited)
- 36 Hours (1953) – Harry Cross, desk clerk
- Star of My Night (1954) – Carl
- Murder by Proxy (1954) – Travis/Victor Vanno
- Dance Little Lady (1954) – Mr. Bridson
- The Passing Stranger (1954) – Spicer
- The Men of Sherwood Forest (1954) – Hubert
- Adventure in the Hopfields (1954) – Sam Hines
- The Quatermass Xperiment (1955) – Christie
- It's a Wonderful World (1956) – Mervyn Wade
- The Flesh Is Weak (1957) – Henry
- The Betrayal (1957) – Clay
- Carve Her Name with Pride (1958) – Commandant Suhren
- Man with the Gun (1958) – John Drayson
- Chain of Events (1958) – Jimmy Boy
- Links of Justice (1958) – (uncredited)
- Paranoiac (1963) – RAF Type
- West 11 (1963) – Silent
- Dr. Terror's House of Horrors (1965) – Roy Shine (segment "Voodoo") (uncredited)
- The Psychopath (1966) – Briggs
- The Baron (1967) – (episode "Countdown")
- Two Gentlemen Sharing (1969) – Camp Neighbour (final film role)

== Other works ==
(21 July 1947) He acted in the musical, "Best Foot Forward," at the Ogunquit Playhouse in Ogunquit, Maine with Edith Fellows, Alice Pearce, Hugh Martin, Michael Hall and Beverly Janis in the cast. John Cecil Holm wrote the book. Hugh Martin and Ralph Blane wrote the music and lyrics.

(1952) He acted in Jean Anouilh's play, "Thieves' Carnival", at the Arts Theatre Club in London, England with John Laurie, Robin Bailey, Wyndham Goldie, Judith Furse, Maxine Audley, David Bird, Gerald Harper and Tutte Lemkow in the cast. Roy Rich was the director. John Hotchkis was the musical director.

(1955) He acted in Marcelle Maurette's stage adaptation and translation of Émile Zola's novel, "Therese Raquin", to the stage as "The Lovers", at the Opera House in Manchester, England with Eva Bartok, Sam Wanamaker, Helen Haye, Kynaston Reeves and Peter Copley in the cast. Sam Wanamaker was also the director.

(November 1955 – December 1955) He played Edmund and Borachio respectively, in William Shakespeare's plays, "King Lear" and "Much Ado About Nothing", at the Shakespeare Memorial Theatre in Stratford, England, and on a UK and European tour; with John Gielgud, Peggy Ashcroft, Moira Lister, Helen Cherry, Anthony Nicholls, George Devine, Raymond Westwell, David O'Brien and Richard Easton in the cast. George Devine and John Gielgud were the directors. Isamu Noguchi and Mariano Andreu were the designers. Roberto Gerhard and Leslie Bridgewater were the musical directors.

(1958) He acted in Bernard Kops' play, "The Hamlet of Stepney Green", at the Lyric Theatre in Hammersmith, London, England with John Fraser, Thelma Ruby, John Barrard and George Selway in the cast.

(1959) He acted in Georg Büchner's play, "Danton's Death", at the Lyric Opera House in Hammersmith, London, England in a 59 Theatre Company production with Patrick McGoohan, Patrick Wymark, James Maxwell, John Turner, Fulton Mackay, Peter Sallis, Lee Fox, Maxwell Shaw, Dilys Hamlett, Avril Elgar and June Bailey in the cast. Caspar Wrede was the director.

(March 1959) He acted in Thomas Otway's translation of Molière's play, The Cheats of Scapin, at the Lyric Theatre in Hammersmith, London, England with Maxwell Shaw, Peter Sallis OBE, Patrick Wymark, Fulton Mackay and Helen Montagu in the cast. Peter Dews was the director.

(1959) He acted in Michael Meyer's translation of Henrik Ibsen's play, "Brand", at the Lyric Theatre in Hammersmith, London, England with the 59 Theatre Company featuring Patrick McGoohan, Dilys Hamlett, Patrick Wymark, Fulton Mackay, Peter Sallis OBE, Frank Windsor and June Bailey in the cast. Michael Elliott was the director.

(1965) He directed William Shakespeare's play, "As You Like It", at the Open Air Theatre in Regents Park, London, England with Ann Morrish, Gary Raymond, Phyllida Law, Edward Atienza, John Justin, Andrew Downie and Alfred Burke in the cast. The crew included Peter Rice (designer) and Elisabeth Lutyens (music).
