= Michael Mellinger =

German actor (1929–2004)

- Born: 30 May 1929; Kochel, Bavaria, Germany
- Died: 17 March 2004 (aged 74); London, England
- Resting place: East London Cemetery
- Education: University of North London; Royal Central School of Speech and Drama
- Occupation: Actor
- Years active: 1947–2004

Michael Andreas Mellinger (30 May 1929 – 17 March 2004) was a German actor in film, television, theatre and radio. He was best known for his appearances on the West End and supporting role in the film Goldfinger (1964).

== Biography ==
Born in Kochel, Bavaria, Mellinger came from a theatrical background; both his parents were actors. He was sent to boarding school in England, and then qualified at North London Polytechnic as a radio engineer. As recorded in his obituary in The Stage: "He made his skills available to his adopted country by joining the Royal Electrical and Mechanical Engineers. During the war he served in Burma and Ceylon with Radio SEAC, doubling as a disc jockey. However, before joining REME, Winston Churchill issued his order: 'Collar the lot'. Ironically, Mellinger, together with many German Jewish refugees who had fled Hitler, was classified as an enemy alien. He was taken to a detention camp at Kempton Park before being put on The Dunera for internment in Australia.... During his internment Mellinger practised, as best he could, his passion for the theatre and developed his talent as a musician. Upon his release he joined the British Army."

He subsequently trained at the Central School of Speech and Drama and in the 1950s was a member of the singing group The Harmonics. For more than 50 years he worked successfully in theatre, film, television and radio. He was a member of the Royal Shakespeare Company and Berliner Ensemble. His notable film credits include Goldfinger (1964) and Carry On Up the Khyber (1968).

== Selected filmography ==
- Captain Horatio Hornblower R.N. (1951) - Spanish Officer (uncredited)
- South of Algiers (1953) - Spahi N.C.O
- They Who Dare (1954) - Toplis
- The Beachcomber (1954) - Medical Orderly
- Radio Cab Murder (1954) - Tim
- Stars in Your Eyes (1956) - Night Club Proprietor
- Three Crooked Men (1958) - Vince
- The Secret Man (1959) - Tony Norwood
- Man on a String (1960) - Detective
- The Password Is Courage (1962) - Feldwebel
- Siege of the Saxons (1963) - Thief (uncredited)
- Goldfinger (1964) - Kisch
- It Happened Here (1964) - Announcer (uncredited)
- Carry On Up the Khyber (1968) - Chindi
- The Assassination Bureau (1969) - Venice Police Sergeant (uncredited)
- Puppet on a Chain (1970) - Hotel Manager
- Licking Hitler (1978) - Karl
- The Awakening (1980) - Hamid
- Eye of the Needle (1981) - Portuguese Man
- Ascendancy (1983) - Schulz
- Until September (1984) - Colonel Viola
- War and Remembrance (1988-1989) - Benjamin Murmelstein
- The March (1990) - Gert Kellner
- Gladiator (2000) - Trainer 2 (extended edition)
- Charlotte Gray (2001) - Old Man Roudil
- Dirty Pretty Things (2002) - German Man
- Das Apfelbaumhaus (2004) - Albert (final film role)
