= Robert Hamer =

British film director and screenwriter (1911–1963)

- Born: 31 March 1911; Kidderminster, Worcestershire, England, UK
- Died: 4 December 1963 (aged 52); London, England, UK
- Education: Corpus Christi College, Cambridge
- Occupations: Film director, screenwriter

Robert Hamer (31 March 1911 – 4 December 1963) was a British film director and screenwriter best known for the 1949 black comedy Kind Hearts and Coronets and the now acknowledged 1947 classic It Always Rains on Sunday.

== Biography ==
Hamer was born at 24 Chester Road, Kidderminster, along with his twin Barbara, the son of Owen Dyke Hamer, a bank clerk, and his wife, Annie Grace Brickell. He was educated at Rossall School, an independent school for boys near the town of Fleetwood in Lancashire, and won a scholarship to Corpus Christi College, Cambridge, where he read the Economics tripos. Although claims have since been made that he was sent down (expelled), with several sources suggesting that he was suspended for homosexual activities, he did in fact graduate with a third-class degree in 1933.

The Oxford Dictionary of National Biography states that Hamer originally intended to join the Treasury as an economist or mathematician until scuppered by his poor academic performance, which he later jokingly put down to a combination of "the proximity of Newmarket Heath [racecourse] to Cambridge and the existence in Cambridge of five cinemas changing programmes twice weekly".

Hamer began his film career in 1934 as a cutting room assistant for Gaumont, and from 1935 worked as a film editor involved with Hitchcock's Jamaica Inn (1939) co-produced by Charles Laughton through his Mayflower Pictures. At the end of the 1930s, he worked on documentaries for the GPO Film Unit. When his boss at the GPO, Alberto Cavalcanti, moved to Ealing Studios, Hamer was invited to join him there. He gained some experience as a director by substituting for colleagues and contributed the 'haunted mirror' sequence to Dead of Night (1945). He followed this with the three Ealing films under his own name for which he is best remembered: Pink String and Sealing Wax (1946), It Always Rains on Sunday (1947), both featuring Googie Withers, and Kind Hearts and Coronets (1949), with Dennis Price and Alec Guinness.

Hamer was an alcoholic who, by the time of his last film as director, School for Scoundrels (1960), was "often battling terrifying DT hallucinations" (i.e. alcohol withdrawal symptoms, occurring only in patients with a history of alcoholism). BFI Screenonline writes that Hamer was "a recovering alcoholic" and that "he fell off the wagon during production [of School For Scoundrels], was sacked on the spot ... and would never work in the industry again." In fact, although he never directed again, he did contribute to two more film screenplays before he died.

Hamer was also homosexual in an era when male homosexual acts were illegal in the UK. He died of pneumonia at the age of 52 at St Thomas's Hospital in London, and is buried at Llandegley. Both of his parents survived him.

According to film critic David Thomson, Hamer's career "now looks like the most serious miscarriage of talent in the postwar British cinema". There is a biography by James Howard, "More than Coronets : directed by Robert Hamer" ([Scotts Valley, Calif.?] : CreateSpace, 2015. 228 pages).

== Filmography ==
=== As director ===
- Dead of Night (1945) – segment "The Haunted Mirror"
- Pink String and Sealing Wax (1945) – also writer
- It Always Rains on Sunday (1947) – also writer
- Kind Hearts and Coronets (1949) – also writer
- The Spider and the Fly (1949)
- His Excellency (1952) – also writer
- The Long Memory (1953) – also writer
- Father Brown (1954) – also writer
- To Paris with Love (1955)
- The Scapegoat (1959) – also writer
- School for Scoundrels (1960)

=== Other film work ===
- Vessel of Wrath (1938) – editor
- St. Martin's Lane (1938) – editor
- Jamaica Inn (1939) – editor
- French Communique (1940) (documentary short) – editor
- Turned Out Nice Again (1941) – editor
- Ships with Wings (1941) – editor
- The Foreman Went to France (1942) – editor
- My Learned Friend (1943) – associate producer
- San Demetrio London (1943) – producer, writer, uncredited direction
- While Nero Fiddled (1944) – lyrics
- The Loves of Joanna Godden (1947) – uncredited direction
- Rowlandson's England (1955) (documentary short) – writer
- 55 Days at Peking (1963) – additional dialogue
- They All Died Laughing (1964) – writer

=== Televised theater ===
- ITV Opening Night at the Guildhall (1955) – play "Private Lives" – director
- ITV Play of the Week (1955) – "A Month in the Country" – director, adaptation
- ITV Play of the Week (1955) – "The Green of the Year" – director, adaptation
