= Maxwell Setton =

British film producer

Maxwell Setton (born 24 October 1909, date of death unknown) was a British film producer, notably active in the 1950s. He was born in Cairo to British parents and studied law, becoming a barrister.

In 1937, he became legal adviser to Mayflower Productions, the production company of Charles Laughton and Erich Pommer. After serving in the war, he became an assistant to Lord Archibald, who was managing Independent Producers Ltd.

After a few years, he set up as a producer with Aubrey Baring and they made movies for a newly organised Mayflower Productions, releasing through Rank. They produced seven films together, predominantly adventure films set outside Britain written by Robert Westerby. Setton then set up his own company, Marksman Films, whose first film was Twist of Fate (1954).

In 1956 it was announced Setton would run the production company of Donna Reed and Tony Owen, Todon, to make six films, starting with The Nylon Web by Westerby. It ended up becoming Town on Trial. However no films resulted. Neither did a proposed biopic of Joseph Conrad.

He made a number of films for Mike Frankovitch's company, Frankovitch Productions, who released through Columbia Pictures. He worked with Ken Hughes and John Guillermin a number of times.

He helped establish Bryanston Films.

In 1964 he was appointed head of European production for Columbia. The following year he became a vice-president of Columbia as well. In 1969 he resigned and announced he was returning to film production with three properties for Columbia: Caravan to Vaccarès by Alistair MacLean, Those Who Walk Away by Patricia Highsmith and Rosy is My Relative by Gerald Durrell. In January 1970 he became Paramount's vice president in charge of foreign production.

== Selected filmography ==
- The Spider and the Fly (1949) - with Aubrey Baring, for Mayflower
- Cairo Road (1950) - with Aubrey Baring, for Mayflower
- The Adventurers (1951) a.k.a. Fortune in Diamonds, The Great Adventure - with Aubrey Baring, for Mayflower
- So Little Time (1952) - with Aubrey Baring, for Mayflower
- Raiders in the Sky a.k.a. Appointment in London (1953) - with Aubrey Baring, for Mayflower
- The Golden Mask a.k.a. South of Algiers (1953) - with Aubrey Baring, for Mayflower
- They Who Dare (1954) - with Aubrey Baring, for Mayflower
- Twist of Fate (1954 film) (1954) (U.S. Beautiful Stranger) - for Marksman
- Footsteps in the Fog (1955) - for Frankovitch Productions and Columbia Pictures
- Keep It Clean (1956) -for Marksman
- Thunderstorm (1956) - for Frankovich Productions
- The Man Who Never Was (1956) - for 20th Century Fox
- Wicked as They Come (1956) - for Frankovitch Productions
- Town on Trial (1957) - for Marksman
- The Long Haul (1957) - for Marksman
- Web of Evidence (1958) a.k.a. Beyond this Place
- I Was Monty's Double (1958) a.k.a. Hell, Heaven or Hoboken
