= Marne Maitland =

Anglo-Indian actor (1914–1991)

- Maitland in The Man with the Golden Gun (1974)
- Born: James Marne Kumar Maitland; 18 December 1914; Calcutta, British India (present-day Kolkata, West Bengal, India)
- Died: 24 August 1991 (aged 76); Terracina, Lazio, Italy
- Education: Magdalene College, Cambridge (BA, 1936)
- Occupation: Actor
- Years active: 1937–1990
- Military career
- Allegiance: United Kingdom
- Branch: British Army
- Rank: Second Lieutenant
- Unit: Royal Artillery
- Conflicts: World War II

James Marne Kumar Maitland (18 December 1914 – 24 August 1991) was an Anglo-Indian actor and voice artist. He worked extensively in the United Kingdom, mainly in character roles, but also appeared in many Italian productions, after moving there in the 1970s.

== Early life ==
Maitland was born in Calcutta, to Anglo-Indian parents. He was educated at Bedales School in Hampshire before going up to Magdalene College, Cambridge, where he took a BA in 1936. He acted in repertory companies before the outbreak of the Second World War led him to enlist in the British Army. He served in the Royal Artillery, commissioned as a second lieutenant on 20 November 1941.

== Career ==
After his military discharge, Maitland joined the Old Vic Company. He made his film debut in Cairo Road (1950). His sharp, dark features and small stature saw him typecast as villains from the Middle and Far East, particularly for Hammer Film Productions. These include The Camp on Blood Island (1958), The Stranglers of Bombay (1960), The Terror of the Tongs (1961), and The Reptile (1966). For a time, he was one of the more prolific Asian actors in the British film industry.

His other film roles include Father Brown (1954), Bhowani Junction (1956), Carlton-Browne of the F.O. (1959), I'm All Right Jack (1959), Cleopatra (1963), Lord Jim (1965), Khartoum (1966), Anne of the Thousand Days (1969), and Man of La Mancha (1972). He played the shady gunsmith Lazar in the 1974 James Bond film The Man with the Golden Gun.

He made numerous television appearances in programmes such as The Buccaneers, Danger Man, The Avengers (as a sinister Eastern delegate in the 1967 episode "Death's Door"), The Saint, The Champions, Department S, and Randall and Hopkirk (Deceased), and the Granada series The Jewel in the Crown (1984, as Pandit Baba, a scholar agitating for an end to British rule in India).

In the early 1970s, Maitland moved to Italy and established residence in Rome, whereupon he appeared in many Italian productions, including in Federico Fellini's Roma and Peter Greenaway's The Belly of an Architect. Like several of his fellow UK actors relocated to Italy, like Cyril Cusack and Edmund Purdom, Maitland moonlighted as an English-language dubber. He was the English dubbing voice of Piero Lulli, Claudio Gora, Luis Dávila, George Rigaud and Venantino Venantini; among others.

== Personal life ==
Maitland was married to actress Bettine Milne, whom he met working at the Bristol Old Vic. The two often worked alongside each other as dubbers.

=== Death ===
Maitland died on 24 August 1991 in Terracina, Lazio, at the age of 76.

== Filmography ==
- Cairo Road (1950) .... Gohari
- Outcast of the Islands (1951) .... Ships Mate
- Deadly Nightshade (1953) .... Heinz
- South of Algiers (1953) .... Thankyou
- Saadia (1953) .... Horse dealer
- Flame and the Flesh (1954) .... Filiberto
- Father Brown (1954) .... Maharajah
- Diplomatic Passport (1954) .... Philip
- Svengali (1954) .... 2nd Stage Manager
- Break in the Circle (1955) .... The phony Kudnic
- The Dark Avenger (1955) .... French Peasant (uncredited)
- Ramsbottom Rides Again (1956) .... (uncredited)
- Bhowani Junction (1956) .... Govindaswami
- Hour of Decision (1956) ..... Club Waiter
- Interpol (1957) .... Guido Martinelli
- Seven Thunders (1957) .... Hassan (uncredited)
- Windom's Way (1957) .... Commissioner Belhedron
- The Mark of the Hawk (1957) .... Sandar Lai
- The Camp on Blood Island (1958) .... Capt. Sakamura
- The Wind Cannot Read (1958) .... Bahadur
- Man with a Gun (1958) .... Max
- I Was Monty's Double (1958) .... Arab Proprietor
- I Only Arsked! (1958) .... King Fazim
- Tiger Bay (1959) .... Dr. Das
- Dial 999 (TV series) – ('An Inside Job', episode 33) -(1959) ....Kirk
- Carlton-Browne of the F.O. (1959) .... Archipolagos (uncredited)
- I'm All Right Jack (1959) .... Mr. Mohammed
- The Stranglers of Bombay (1959) .... Patel Shari
- Cone of Silence (1960) .... Mr. Robinson
- Sands of the Desert (1960) .... Advisor to Sheikh
- The Terror of the Tongs (1961) .... Beggar
- Passport to China (1961) .... Han Po
- Three on a Spree (1961) .... Eastern gentleman
- Middle Course (1961) .... Renard
- The Phantom of the Opera (1962) .... Xavier
- Panic (1963) .... Lantern
- Nine Hours to Rama (1963) .... Karnick
- Master Spy (1963) .... Dr. Asafu
- Sammy Going South (1963) .... Hassan
- Cleopatra (1963) .... Ephranor
- First Men in the Moon (1964) .... Dr. Tok, UN Space Agency (uncredited)
- Lord Jim (1965) .... Elder
- The Return of Mr. Moto (1965) .... Wasir Hussein, the Shahrdar's Assistant
- The Reptile (1965) .... The Malay
- Khartoum (1966) .... Sheikh Osman
- The Bobo (1967) .... Luiz Castillo
- Duffy (1968) .... Abdul
- Decline and Fall... of a Birdwatcher (1968) .... Junior Policeman
- The Shoes of the Fisherman (1968) .... Cardinal Rahamani
- Journey to Midnight (1968) .... Edward Chardur (episode 'The Indian Spirit Guide')
- The Bushbaby (1969) .... The Hadj
- Anne of the Thousand Days (1969) .... Cardinal Campeggio
- The Statue (1971) .... UNO Secretary General
- Roma (1972) .... Guide in the Catacombs
- Man of La Mancha (1972) .... Captain of the Guard
- Shaft in Africa (1973) .... Col. Gonder
- Massacre in Rome (1973) .... Pancrazio's secretary (uncredited)
- Street Law (1974) .... Records (uncredited)
- The Man with the Golden Gun (1974) .... Mr. Lazar
- Down the Ancient Staircase (1975)
- The Pink Panther Strikes Again (1976) .... Deputy Commissioner Lasorde (scenes deleted)
- March or Die (1977) .... Leon
- Ashanti (1979) .... Touraeg Chief
- Lovers and Liars (1979)
- The Black Stallion (1979) .... Drake Captain
- Grog (1982)
- Trail of the Pink Panther (1982) .... Deputy Commissioner Lasorde
- Pope John Paul II (1984) .... Mountain Sacristan
- The Scarlet and the Black (1983).....Papal Secretary
- Memed, My Hawk (1984) .... Suleyman
- The Assisi Underground (1985) .... Rabbi
- I Am an ESP (1985) .... Dinner guest
- The Belly of an Architect (1987) .... Battistino
- Appointment in Liverpool (1988) .... Pilar
- Stradivari (1988) .... Doctor
- And the Violins Stopped Playing (1988) .... Sandu Mirga, Dymitr's father
- A Violent Life (1990) .... Blind cardinal
- The King's Whore (1990) .... Count Trevie (final film role)

== Partial stage credits ==
Year	Title	Role	Venue	Ref.
1937–38	Macbeth	Ensemble	The Old Vic, London	
1940	The Tempest	Antonio	The Old Vic, London	
1946–47	Throng O’Scarlet		Bristol Old Vic, Bristol	
1946–47	Much Ado About Nothing		Bristol Old Vic, Bristol	
1948	Captain Brassbound's Conversion	Sidi El Assif	Theatre Royal, Windsor	
1948–49	Captain Brassbound's Conversion	Sidi El Assif	Lyric Theatre, London	
1948–49	Captain Brassbound's Conversion	Sidi El Assif	UK tour	
1950	The Purple Fig-Tree	Major Skouze	Theatre Royal, Brighton	
1950	The Purple Fig-Tree	Major Skouze	Piccadilly Theatre, London	
1950	The Man with the Umbrella	Police Officer	Duchess Theatre, London	
1954	The Immoralist		Arts Theatre, London	
1956	Simple Spymen	Mr. Grobchick	Theatre Royal, Windsor	
1961	The Bird of Time	Mr. Sharma	Royal Court Theatre, Liverpool	
1961	The Bird of Time	Mr. Sharma	Savoy Theatre, London	
1962	Orange Island	Sultan Muglad	Theatre Royal, Windsor	
