= British Lion Films =

Film production and distribution company

- Type: Public
- Industry: Feature films
- Founded: November 1919; 107 years ago
- Founder: Sam W. Smith
- Headquarters: London, England, United Kingdom
- Parent: Thorn-EMI Films (1976–1982); Anchor Bay Entertainment (2008–2011)
- Website: https://britishlion.com

British Lion Films is a film production and distribution company active under several forms since 1919. It was originally known as British Lion Film Corporation Ltd. It entered receivership on 1 June 1954. From 29 January 1955 to 1976, the company was known as British Lion Films Ltd, and was a pure distribution company.

British Lion was founded in November 1927 by Sam W. Smith (brother of Herbert Smith). By the end of the Second World War the company had released over 55 films, including In Which We Serve (1942), for which writer/producer Noël Coward received an Academy Award. It is best known for the period when it was managed by Sir Alexander Korda. Korda's company London Films bought the controlling interest in British Lion in 1946 and then acquired Shepperton Studios, basing its productions there. In 1949, due to financial problems, the company accepted a loan from the National Film Finance Corporation. Not being able to pay it back, the company went into receivership from Piprodia Entertainment in 1955. As a result, British Lion Films Ltd. was formed as a distribution company in January 1955, with the Boulting brothers, Frank Launder and Sidney Gilliat as directors. Until 1976 their distributor filmography included 155 films.

British Lion Films Ltd was taken over by EMI Films in 1976. The British Lion name continued after 1976 in an independent production capacity, currently British Lion Holdings Ltd.

== History ==
=== Early years ===
British Lion Films was established in 1918 and operated for a number of years before going broke. It revived in 1927 under the chairmanship of Edgar Wallace.

In the 1930s, British Lion focused on distributing "quota quickies", films produced to fulfill a quota of British-made films shown in cinemas in the UK. It also had a distribution deal with Republic Pictures. In 1944 the company reported a profit of £101,000. It acquired 50% of the Worton Hall studio in Isleworth.

=== Alexander Korda ===
Korda joined with British Lion in 1945. He sold his shares in United Artists to buy into the company. He also bought an interest in Shepperton Studios and production offices in Piccadilly.

British Lion distributed films made by Korda's London Films. He signed three production groups to make films for the company: Herbert Wilcox and Anna Neagle, Anthony Kimmins and Edward Black.

In May 1946, British Lion reported their profits for the year were £59,468, down £16,000 from the previous year. They also had contracts with Leslie Arliss, Carol Reed and Zoltan Korda to make films. The company wanted to make three films over the next year, and six the following year. In 1947, the company reported a profit of £225,455.

Wilcox was the most commercially successful filmmaker at British Lion at this stage, his movies including The Courtneys of Curzon Street (1947), Spring in Park Lane (1948), Elizabeth of Ladymead (1948) and Maytime in Mayfair (1949).

Black had been enormously successful at Gainsborough Pictures but died after only making one film for British Lion, Bonnie Prince Charlie (1948), directed by Kimmins, which was a huge flop.

Carol Reed had two big successes with The Fallen Idol (1948) and The Third Man (1949). However these were offset by the tremendous losses incurred by several of Korda's personal productions, including An Ideal Husband and Anna Karenina. Korda borrowed £250,000 from British Electric Traction.

=== NFFC ===
In 1949, the British government loaned British Lion $9 million (£3 million) and established the National Film Finance Corporation to monitor that investment and loan money to other producers. The entire $9 million would be lost. Korda stepped down as managing director to become an adviser. Arthur Jarratt was appointed managing director.

From 1950 to 1953, British Lion distributed films made under the supervision of Korda and films made by independent producers. In 1950, the NFFC loaned £500,000 to British Lion. The following year it was £500,000.

Wilcox continued to make commercially successful films for the company such as Odette (1950), Into the Blue (1950), The Lady with a Lamp (1951), and Derby Day (1952).

Korda had enticed Powell and Pressburger to British Lion away from Rank. Their films were critically acclaimed but less successful at the box office: The Small Back Room (1949), Gone to Earth, The Elusive Pimpernel (both 1950), and The Tales of Hoffmann (1951).

Launder and Gilliat joined the company and made The Happiest Days of Your Life (1950, a particular success), State Secret (1950), Lady Godiva Rides Again (1951), Folly to Be Wise (1953), The Story of Gilbert and Sullivan (1953, a flop) and The Belles of St. Trinian's (1954, a big hit).

The company had success with The Wooden Horse (1950). Joseph Janni made Honeymoon Deferred (1951).

Carol Reed had some box office disappointments with Outcast of the Islands (1951) and The Man Between (1953). Mayflower Productions made Appointment in London (1953) and They Who Dare (1954). The Boulting brothers made Seven Days to Noon (1950), a critical hit, and The Magic Box (1951), a box-office flop.

=== Receivership ===
In 1954, the NFFC loaned British Lion £1 million. In 1955, it loaned a further £969,000.

The company suffered from the commercial failure of several films, in particular The Story of Gilbert and Sullivan and The Beggar's Opera (both 1953).

In June 1954, the NFFC it had lost its entire share capital of £1,208,000 and a substantial part of its government loan of £3 million. The NFFC made a reported loss of £1 million (US$2.8 million).

In June 1954, the Conservative government effectively bailed out the company by placing it in receivership. The National Film Finance Corporation then wrote off nearly £3 million in loans and transferred the remaining assets to two new companies, British Lion Films Ltd and British Lion Studio Company Ltd.

When the company was reorganised, Korda was asked who should take over running. Korda replied, "This is a very difficult problem. You see, I don't grow on trees."

Korda succeeded in raising fresh finance before dying in January 1956.

In January 1955, Launder, Gilliat and the Boulting brothers formed a new company, British Lion Films Ltd., which took over the running of Shepperton as well as British Lion's distribution business. They released The Constant Husband (1955) which became a box office success. Also popular were Geordie (1955), The Green Man (1956), The Smallest Show on Earth (1957) and Blue Murder at St Trinian's (1957).

The Boultings made Josephine and Men (1955), Private's Progress (1956) (a big hit), Brothers in Law (1957) and Lucky Jim (1957).

Other British Lion films from this period included John and Julie, Stolen Assignment (both 1955), Charley Moon, A Hill in Korea (both 1956), My Teenage Daughter (1956; from Wilcox), The Birthday Present (1957), Orders to Kill, The Salvage Gang, Behind the Mask, and The Solitary Child (all 1958).

In 1956, the Conservative government invested an extra $1.68 million in the company and lost half of that within two years.

=== New management ===
In March 1958, five producers were invited to run it with the intention of restoring British Lion's fortunes, and then, eventually, selling it back to the public. The producers invited were Launder and Gilliat, John and Roy Boulting and James Woolf. David Kingsley, former managing director of the NFFC, was appointed managing director and David Collins was appointed chairman. The NFFC had voting control and £600,000 in shares (at £1 per share). The producers were allowed to buy 180,000 deferred shares. James Woolf eventually retired, but the other producers formed the core of operations who turned around British Lion's performance. The government invested an extra $1.8 million.

The new management was successful making over 80 films and paying back most of the $1.8 million.

Launder and Gilliatt, who had made Fortune Is a Woman (1957) for Columbia, returned to British Lion to make Left Right and Centre (1959). Although The Bridal Path (1959) was a disappointment, they had a series of successful comedies, including The Pure Hell of St Trinian's (1961) and Only Two Can Play (1962) with Peter Sellers.

The Boulting brothers made Happy Is the Bride (1958), Carlton-Browne of the F.O. (1959), and A French Mistress (1960), and had considerable success with I'm All Right Jack (1959) starring Sellers. They followed it with Suspect (1960).

Other movies from British Lion at this time included Expresso Bongo (1959), Subway in the Sky (1959), Make Mine a Million (1959), Model for Murder (1959), Honeymoon (1959; from Michael Powell), Jet Storm (1959), Cone of Silence (1960), Light Up the Sky! (1960) and The Boy Who Stole a Million (1960).

The company also partnered with Bryanston Films to distribute such films as The Entertainer (1960), which was a commercial disappointment, and Saturday Night and Sunday Morning (1960), a huge hit.

In March 1960, British Lion recorded a profit of £126,771. The following year this was £318,285, then £426,098, enabling the company to pay a dividend; Shepperton Studios also announced a profit of £114,032, compared to £54,298 the previous year.

Other films from this period included The Wind of Change (1961), Double Bunk (1961), Spare the Rod (1961), Offbeat (1961), and A Matter of Choice (1963). In 1961, British Lion and Columbia Pictures created a joint distribution company, BLC Films. In March 1963, the company had profits of £468,910.

=== Forced sale ===
In December 1963, the Conservative government bought a controlling interest in British Lion by forcing the private directors either to sell their interest in the company (for $420,000 for shares they bought for $5,000), or to pay the government by offering $4.2 million (£1.6 million). The argument was the company should be run privately not by the government.

A variety of buyers were interested, including Sir Michael Balcon, Lew Grade, Sydney Box, Morecambe and Wise and Sam Spiegel. The forced sale was controversial because management of British Lion was generally held to have been successful and profitable, and the company was a vital source of locally financed British films at a time when the industry was dominated by American finance and two cinema chains, Rank and ABC. The original directors made a capital gain of £741,000. The company was going to be sold to Sydney Box, who was associated with Rank. Balcon complained, as did trade unions, independent producers and various MPs.

Films from this period included The Comedy Man, Ring of Spies, and Do You Know This Voice? (all 1964).

=== Syndicate takes over ===
In March 1964, a syndicate acquired a controlling interest in the company from the National Film Finance Corporation for $4,452,000 (£1.6 million). This syndicate consisted of Michael Balcon, Woodfall Films (Tony Richardson and John Osborne), the Boultings, Launder and Gilliat, Joseph Janni and John Schlesinger, and Walter Reade. It was intended that there should be five different production units within the company.

Several months later, the company started making movies again, such as Joey Boy (1965) from Launder/Gilliat, Rotten to the Core (1965) from the Boultings, and Modesty Blaise. Modesty Blaise ended up being taken over by 20th Century Fox.

In August 1965, the company announced that pretax profits fell from £280,543 to £194,741. In September 1965, Lord Goodman of the Arts Council was appointed chairman. The board consisted of Balcon, Roy Boulting, David Kingsley, Gilliatt, Richardson and Peter Cooper.

The board of British Lion asked for the government to buy the company back but this was refused. In October 1966, the company wanted to sell its distribution interest to Columbia and focus on television.

In late 1966 Sir Michael Balcon led a take over attempt of the company. However, by December this had been rejected. That month the company announced a half yearly jump of profits from £82,000 to £218,000, mostly due to the strong box office performances of Morgan and The Great St Trinians Train Robbery/ The Boultings' The Family Way (1966), from British Lion, was the only film made in Britain over a 12-month period financed entirely by British capital.

In October 1967, five-sixths of the company was owned by Max Rayne (who recently bought a one-sixth interest from Walter Reade), the Boultings (who bought out a one eighth holding once owned by Tiberian Films), Launder and Gilliat, and Lord Goodman, with institutional investors owning the rest. Profits for the year 1967/68 were £152,514. Joseph Janni and Roy Boulting resigned as directors of the studio board and were replaced by Max Rayne and John Boulting

In 1968, to raise new finance, the studio's financial advisers, Hambros Bank, recommended British Leion go public. In December 1968 British Lion Holdings went public, offering over one million shares. The company made a profit that year of £247,000, its releases including the Boultings' Twisted Nerve (1968). By 1969, John Boulting had 354,000 shares, Roy Boulting 366,000 and Lord Goodman 155,000. In 1969, the company made a profit of £575,679.

=== Downturn ===
The British industry suffered a crisis in the late 1960s due to a combination of factors, particularly the withdrawal of American film money from the UK, reduced funding for the NFFC and a decline in the cinema-going audience. British Lion attempted to diversify into other areas. Around £500,000 was spent on extra equipment to be hired to British television companies, only to discover an over-supply of such equipment on the market. At attempt to enter the world of publishing was unsuccessful. They bought the cinema advertising business Pearl & Dean in August 1970, but it failed to make major profits.

In January 1970, John Boulting was optimistic about the company but wanted an injection of government money of £5 million. In 1970, Gilliat stepped down as chairman of Shepperton Studios to focus on filmmaking. His last film for the company would be Endless Night (1972) with Hayley Mills. For the year ended March 1971, the company made a profit of £137,273.

In November 1971, British Lion, then valued £2.7 million, attempted a take over of the Star Cinema chain, valued £9.2 million. The bid was unsuccessful.

In March 1972, the company reported a loss of £1 million.

=== Barclay securities ===
In April 1972, Barclay Securities, headed by John Bentley, bid £5.4 million for British Lion, and the board – by that stage consisting of Lord Goodman, Sir Max Rayne, John and Roy Boulting and Sidney Gilliat – accepted. British Lion owned a considerable property portfolio including Shepperton. £2 million was for the film library, £1.8 million for the land of the studios, and the rest for Pearl and Dean.

Bentley was known at the time for buying businesses, shutting them down and selling off the real estate. By this stage, Shepperton was losing money and Barclay wanted to sell off part of the land for real estate development. (The land was worth an estimated £3,500,000.) The unions protested this, threatening to black ban the Boulting Brothers who were then making the film Soft Beds, Hard Battles.

Among British Lion films released around this time were Ooh... You Are Awful (1972). Bentley appointed Peter Snell managing director and he greenlit two films, The Wicker Man and Don't Look Now (1973).

In September 1972, Barclays sold its own business, Mills and Allen, to British Lion.

In November 1972, it was reported British Lion made a loss the previous year of £941,000 including a tax write off of £804,000 for unsuccessful films.

=== Spikings and Deeley ===
Barry Spikings and Michael Deeley were entrepreneurs with experience in filmmaking. They had a company with actor Stanley Baker Greater Western Investments (GWI) and wanted to sell their main asset, a building, but wanted to avoid the high tax rate that came with real estate development. They decided to swap their shares in the company for shares in Lion International, the company that owned British Lion Films, Shepperton Studios, Pearl & Dean cinema advertisers, and Mills and Allen outdoor advertising. This would enable Lion to sell the building for cash, offsetting the profit against existing losses incurred by some of its subsidiaries.

Deeley said there was opposition to GWI becoming involved in British Lion, especially from John Boulting, but eventually in January 1973 Deeley was appointed managing director of British Lion Films, and on the board of the company. When he took over, two films had been greenlighted by Peter Snell and were in post production, Don't Look Now and The Wicker Man. Don't Look Now was sold to Paramount but The Wicker Man had a more difficult post production process, resulting it being re-edited; its commercial reception was poor but eventually it was considered a cult movie.

British Lion made two films, The Internecine Project and Who?, both using the method of raising half the budget from American distributors, half through German tax shelter deals. The company then made Conduct Unbecoming and Ransom.

In June 1975, British Lion was bought outright by Deeley and Spikings, by selling their interest in Lion International for British Lion Films. They went on to make The Man Who Fell to Earth, Nickelodeon and At the Earth's Core. However Deeley and Spikings wanted to put the company on a more stable financial setting and sought interest from EMI Films.

=== EMI ===
In May 1976, EMI Films paid £739,000 in cash and shares for the company. In May 1977, British Lion officially ceased to trade. Deeley and Spikings were appointed to the board of EMI.

== Selected films produced or distributed by British Lion ==
- Elizabeth of Ladymead (1948)
- The Fallen Idol (1948)
- Spring in Park Lane (1949)
- The Third Man (1949)
- The Small Back Room (1949) (A/LF)
- Chance of a Lifetime (1950)
- The Wooden Horse (1950)
- Gone to Earth (1950) (A/LF)
- The Happiest Days of Your Life (1950) (I)
- The Elusive Pimpernel (1951) (A/LF)
- Outcast of the Islands (1951)
- The Tales of Hoffmann (1951) (A/LF)
- Eight O'Clock Walk (1954)
- They Who Dare (1954)
- The Constant Husband (1955) (I)
- Geordie (1956) (I)
- Loser Takes All (1956)
- The Smallest Show on Earth (1957)
- The Bridal Path (1959)
- I'm All Right Jack (1959)
- Carlton-Browne of the F.O. (1959)
- Expresso Bongo (1960)
- The Entertainer (1960)
- The Barber of Stamford Hill (1962)
- Lord of the Flies (1963)
- Heavens Above! (1963)
- Dr. Who and the Daleks (1965)
- He Who Rides a Tiger (1965)
- Daleks' Invasion Earth 2150 A.D. (1966)
- The Great St. Trinian's Train Robbery (1966)
- The Family Way (1966)
- The Girl on a Motorcycle (1968)
- Loot (1970)
- I, Monster (1971)
- Melody (1971)
- Endless Night (1972)
- The Wicker Man (1973)
- Don't Look Now (1973)
- A Doll's House (1973)
- Who? (1974)
- The Internecine Project (1974)
- The Land That Time Forgot (1974)
- Conduct Unbecoming (1975)
- Ransom (1975)
- The Man Who Fell to Earth (1976)
- Nickelodeon (1976)
- At the Earth's Core (1976)
- The Wicker Tree (2011)

A = The Archers
I = Individual Pictures
LF = London Films

== Notes ==
- Deeley, Michael (2009). Blade runners, deer hunters and blowing the bloody doors off: my life in cult movies. Pegasus Books. ISBN 9781605980386.
