= Jamaica Inn (film) =

1939 film by Alfred Hitchcock

- US theatrical release poster
- Directed by: Alfred Hitchcock
- Written by: Sidney Gilliat; Joan Harrison; Alma Reville; J. B. Priestley
- Based on: Jamaica Inn; 1936 novel by Daphne du Maurier
- Produced by: Erich Pommer; Charles Laughton
- Starring: Charles Laughton; Maureen O'Hara; Leslie Banks; Robert Newton
- Cinematography: Bernard Knowles; Harry Stradling
- Edited by: Robert Hamer
- Music by: Eric Fenby
- Production company: Mayflower Pictures
- Distributed by: Associated British Picture Corporation (UK); Paramount Pictures (US)
- Release date: 12 May 1939
- Running time: 108 minutes 99 minutes (original US release)
- Country: United Kingdom
- Language: English
- Budget: £200,436

Jamaica Inn is a 1939 British adventure thriller film directed by Alfred Hitchcock and adapted from Daphne du Maurier's 1936 novel of the same name. It is the first of three of du Maurier's works that Hitchcock adapted (the others were her novel Rebecca and short story "The Birds"). It stars Charles Laughton (who also produced the film through his Mayflower Pictures) and Maureen O'Hara in her first major screen role. It is the last film Hitchcock made in the United Kingdom before he moved to the United States.

The film is a period piece set in Cornwall in 1820, in the real Jamaica Inn (which still exists) on the edge of Bodmin Moor.

== Plot ==
In 1820 the Jamaica Inn houses the clandestine rural headquarters of a gang of cut-throats and thieves, led by innkeeper Joss Merlyn. They have become wreckers who are responsible for shipwrecks in which they extinguish coastal warning beacons, causing ships to run aground on the rocky Cornish coast. They then kill the surviving sailors and steal their cargo.

One evening, a young Irishwoman, Mary Yellan, is dropped off by coach near the inn, at the home of the local squire and justice of the peace, Sir Humphrey Pengallan. Despite Pengallan's warnings, she intends to live at Jamaica Inn with her late mother's sister Patience, the wife of Joss Merlyn. It transpires that Pengallan is the mastermind behind the wrecking gang; he learns from his well-to-do friends and acquaintances when well-laden ships are passing near the coast, determines when and where the wrecks are to be caused, and fences the stolen cargo. He uses most of the proceeds to support his lavish lifestyle and passes a small fraction of them to the gang.

The gang convenes to discuss why they get so little money for their efforts. They suspect Jem Trehearne, a gang member for two months, of embezzling goods. They hang him from one of the rafters of the inn, but when they leave, Mary cuts the rope. Trehearne and Mary flee the gang and seek the protection of Pengallan, unaware that he is the gang's benefactor. Trehearne reveals to Pengallan that he is an undercover law-officer on a mission to investigate the wrecks. Pengallan pretends to join forces with him.

Pengallan then learns of a ship full of precious cargo that is due to pass the coastline. He informs Joss and the gang, who extinguish the coastal warning beacon. However, Mary re-lights the beacon, and the ship's crew avoid the treacherous rocks and sail by unharmed. The gang resolves to kill Mary as revenge for preventing the wreck, but Joss, who has developed a reluctant admiration for her, rescues her, and the two escape by horse-cart. Joss is shot in the back and collapses when they reach Jamaica Inn. As Patience is about to tell Mary that Pengallan is the leader of the wrecking gang, Pengallan shoots and kills Patience. Joss dies of his wound. Pengallan then takes Mary hostage and tells her that he plans to keep her now that she has no one else in the world. He drives her to the harbour, where they board a ship going to France.

Back at Jamaica Inn, Trehearne and a dozen soldiers take Joss's gang into custody. Trehearne then rides to the harbour to rescue Mary and capture Pengallan, who attempts to escape. During the chase, he climbs to the top of the ship's mast, from which he jumps to his death.

== Cast ==
- Charles Laughton as Sir Humphrey Pengallan
- Leslie Banks as Joss Merlyn
- Maureen O'Hara as Mary Yellen
- Robert Newton as James 'Jem' Trehearne - Sir Humphrey's Gang
- Marie Ney as Patience Merlyn
- Horace Hodges as Butler (Chadwick)
- Hay Petrie as Groom (Sam)
- Frederick Piper as Agent (Davis)
- Herbert Lomas as Tenant (Dowland)
- Clare Greet as Tenant (Granny Tremarney)
- William Devlin as Tenant (Burdkin)
- Emlyn Williams as Harry the Pedlar - Sir Humphrey's Gang
- Jeanne de Casalis as Sir Humphrey's friend
- Mabel Terry-Lewis as Lady Beston
- A. Bromley Davenport as Ringwood (credited as Bromley Davenport)
- George Curzon as Captain Murray
- Basil Radford as Lord George
- Wylie Watson as Salvation Watkins - Sir Humphrey's Gang
- Morland Graham as Sea Lawyer Sydney - Sir Humphrey's Gang
- Edwin Greenwood as Dandy - Sir Humphrey's Gang
- Mervyn Johns as Thomas - Sir Humphrey's Gang
- Stephen Haggard as The Boy, Willie Penhale - Sir Humphrey's Gang
- John Longden as Captain Johnson (uncredited)
- Aubrey Mather as Coachman (uncredited)

== Character actors ==
Several secondary characters are played by notable stage-and-screen character actors of the time, including "bruiser-type" actor Leslie Banks (who played Count Zaroff in The Most Dangerous Game) as Joss Merlyn; and Robert Newton as Jem Trehearne, a suave young secret-police agent.

== Production ==
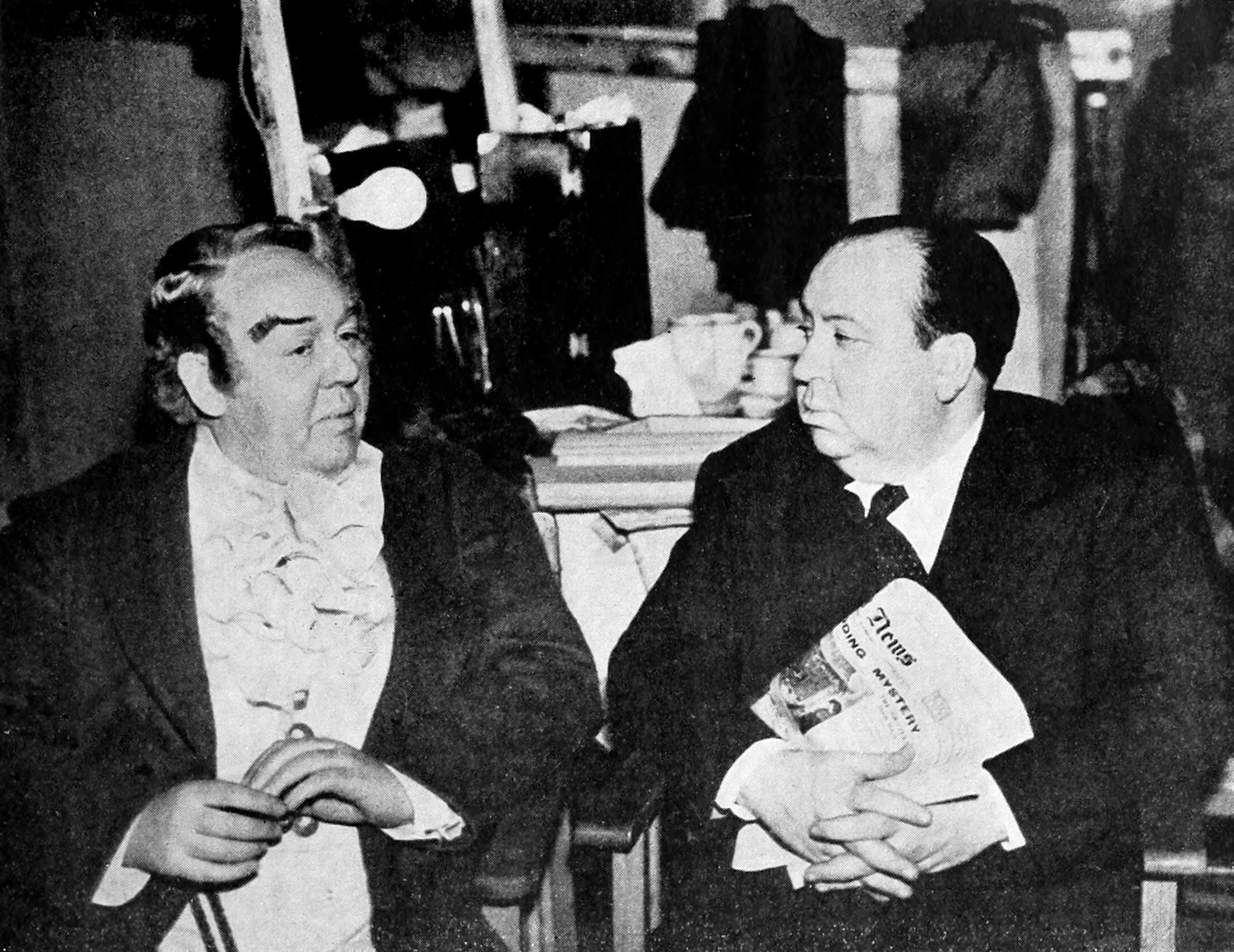
Laughton and Hitchcock at Elstree Studios during the filming of Jamaica Inn

Charles Laughton was a co-producer on this movie, through his independent film production company Mayflower Pictures, and he reportedly interfered greatly with Hitchcock's direction. Laughton was initially cast as Joss, but he cast himself in the role of the villainous Pengallan, who originally was a hypocritical preacher but was rewritten as a squire because unsympathetic portrayals of the clergy were forbidden by the Production Code in Hollywood. Sidney Gilliat did these rewrites as a favour to Hitchcock.

Laughton then demanded that Hitchcock give his character greater screen time. This forced Hitchcock to reveal that Pengallan was a villain in league with the smugglers earlier in the film than Hitchcock had initially planned.

Laughton's acting was a problem point as well for Hitchcock. Laughton portrayed Pengallan as having a mincing walk that went to the beat of a German waltz that he played in his head, and Hitchcock thought it was out of character. Laughton also demanded that Maureen O'Hara be given the lead after watching her screen test (her acting in the screen test was sub par, but Laughton could not forget her eyes). After filming finished, Laughton brought her to Hollywood to play Esmeralda opposite his Quasimodo in the hit 1939 version of The Hunchback of Notre Dame, after which she became an international star.

Indian filmmaker Bibhuti Mitra, then a student of cinematography, served as an assistant to Hitchcock during the film's production.

On release, the film was a substantial commercial success and in April 1939, Hitchcock moved to Hollywood to begin his contract with David O. Selznick. Thus, Jamaica Inn was the last of his "British period" films, though he returned to Britain often over the years to film other pictures there: Aventure Malgache and Bon Voyage (both 1944), Under Capricorn (filmed in 1948), Stage Fright (filmed in 1949), The Man Who Knew Too Much (filmed in 1955), and Frenzy (filmed in 1971).

=== Credits ===
- Director - Alfred Hitchcock
- Producer - Erich Pommer
- Writers - Sidney Gilliat (screenplay and dialogue), Joan Harrison (screenplay), J. B. Priestley (additional dialogue), Daphne du Maurier (underlying novel)
- Cinematography - Harry Stradling and Bernard Knowles (photography)
- Continuity - Alma Reville
- Art direction - Tom Morahan (settings)
- Costumes - Molly McArthur
- Music - Eric Fenby (music); Frederic Lewis (musical director)
- Sound - Jack Rogerson
- Film editor - Robert Hamer
- Special effects - Harry Watt
- Makeup artist - Ern Westmore
- Production manager - Hugh Perceval

== Reception ==
Many critics were somewhat disparaging of the film, largely because of the lack of atmosphere and tension which was present in the book. The film's light-hearted, often camp, banter and portly landlord, were seen as being too far removed from the darker characters, sinister inn and coastline depicted in du Maurier's story. Today it is often considered to be one of Hitchcock's lesser works. Hitchcock expressed his disappointment with the film even before it was finished, stating that it was a "completely absurd" idea. However, the film garnered a large profit (US$3.7 million, a huge success at the time) at the box office. Daphne du Maurier was not pleased with the finished production and for a while she considered withholding the film rights to Rebecca. In 1978, film critic Michael Medved gave Jamaica Inn a place in his book The Fifty Worst Films of All Time, but this was based on a viewing of a poor quality and incomplete US print, the only copy available at the time.

== Copyright status and home media ==
Jamaica Inn is copyrighted worldwide but has been heavily bootlegged on home video. Despite this, various licensed, restored releases have appeared on DVD, Blu-ray and video on demand services from Network Distributing and Arrow Films in the UK, the Cohen Film Collection in the US, and many others.
