= John Bailey (British actor) =

British actor (1912–1989)

- Bailey in the Adam Adamant Lives! episode "The Village of Evil" (1966)
- Born: John Albert Bailey; 26 June 1912; New Cross, London, England
- Died: 18 February 1989 (aged 76); London, England
- Occupation: Actor

John Albert Bailey (26 June 1912 – 18 February 1989) was a British screen and TV actor who had a long screen, stage and TV career. He was born in South East London.

In 1936 he played Archie Forsyth on the BBC production "Scenes from Marigold". He took a number of film roles during the late 1940s and early 1950s which included a sinister role, Stringer, in High Treason. During the 1960s, he appeared in a number of high-profile BBC TV roles such as in Doctor Who and Steptoe and Son. Most famously, he played the artist Aubrey Green in The Forsyte Saga in (1967). He also took the lead in a highly acclaimed Wednesday Play.

One of his notable early films was High Treason by Roy Boulting (1951). Set in a tense and austere London during the early Cold War, the plot follows the secret services MI5 pursuing a terrorist cell group, with Bailey playing the cold and ruthless assassin, Stringer. As an actor, he had considerable vocal range, notably employing a clipped, upper class English accent as Inspector Grant in Josephine Tey's The Franchise Affair (1951). His dark looks and range of accents led to roles as Italians or Eastern Europeans.

BBC TV's The Wednesday Play about Sacco and Vanzetti (1965) addressed the topical issue of the death penalty. Written by Jean Benedetti the play was entitled The Good Shoe Maker and the Poor Fish Pedlar. John Bailey played Bartolomeo Vanzetti, an Italian immigrant in America whose execution was widely regarded as having been a miscarriage of justice.

He also made various appearances in Doctor Who, including The Sensorites (1964), playing Edward Waterfield in The Evil of the Daleks (1967) and The Horns of Nimon (1979–80), as well as appearing in several episodes of The Avengers and as Hans Frank in the 1978 American television miniseries Holocaust.

== Selected filmography ==
- It Happened in Soho (1948)
- Meet Simon Cherry (1949)
- Man on the Run (1949)
- Celia (1949)
- Cairo Road (1950)
- Circle of Danger (1951) as Pape Llewellyn
- The Franchise Affair (1951) as Inspector Grant
- High Treason (1951) as Stringer
- Venetian Bird (1952) as Lieutenant Longo
- The Night Won't Talk (1952) as Clayton Hawkes
- So Little Time (1952)
- The Hostage (1956)
- Operation Amsterdam (1959) as an officer
- Moment of Danger (1960)
- Never Let Go (1960) as MacKinnon
- Rasputin, the Mad Monk (1966) as the royal physician
- A Choice of Kings (1966) as FitzOsbern
- Running Scared (1972) as Inspector
- The 14 (1973) as Mr. Sanders
- Personal Services (1987) as Mr. Gardner
