= The Bad Lord Byron =

1949 film by David MacDonald

- Directed by: David MacDonald
- Written by: Paul Holt; Laurence Kitchin; Peter Quennell; Anthony Thorne; Terence Young
- Produced by: Aubrey Baring executive Sydney Box associate Alfred Roome
- Starring: Dennis Price; Mai Zetterling
- Cinematography: Stephen Dade
- Edited by: James Needs
- Music by: Cedric Thorpe Davie
- Production company: Triton Films (Sydney Box Productions)
- Distributed by: GFD (UK); International Releasing Organisation (US)
- Release dates: 18 April 1949 (UK); 1952 (US)
- Running time: 85 minutes
- Country: United Kingdom
- Language: English
- Budget: £223,900
- Box office: £75,000 (by 1953) or £44,700

The Bad Lord Byron is a 1949 British historical drama film about the life of Lord Byron. It was directed by David MacDonald and starred Dennis Price as Byron with Mai Zetterling, Linden Travers and Joan Greenwood.

== Plot ==
The film sees life from the perspective of Lord Byron, seriously wounded in Greece where he is fighting for Greek independence. From his deathbed, Byron remembers his life and many loves, imagining that he's pleading his case before a celestial court.

The first witness called is Lady Caroline Lamb who recalls their relationship. She met Byron after a ball and they began an affair. He writes the poem She Walks in Beauty about another woman, causing Lady Caroline to stab herself with a broken glass. He breaks things off and Lady Caroline is sent to Ireland.

The next witness is Annabella Milbanke who talks about her romance and marriage to Byron, including the birth of their child.

The third witness is Augusta Leigh, with whom Annabelle thought Byron was having an affair, although Augusta denies it.

John Hobhouse, 1st Baron Broughton is the fourth witness. He talks about Byron's political career and how he became famous overnight through his poetry and meeting Teresa, Contessa Guiccioli.

Teresa is the fifth witness. She talks of their love affair while she was married and his involvement in the Carbonari in Italy. Byron leaves her to go fight for Greek independence. The celestial judge (played by Dennis Price) tells the viewer it is up to them to decide whether Byron was good or bad.

== Cast ==
- Dennis Price as Lord Byron
- Mai Zetterling as Teresa Guiccioli
- Joan Greenwood as Lady Caroline Lamb
- Linden Travers as Augusta Leigh
- Sonia Holm as Annabella Milbanke
- Raymond Lovell as John Hobhouse
- Leslie Dwyer as Fletcher
- Denis O'Dea as Prosecuting Counsel
- Irene Browne as Lady Melbourne
- Virgílio Teixeira as Pietro Gamba
- Ernest Thesiger as Count Guiccioli
- Gerard Heinz as Austrian Officer
- Cyril Chamberlain as Defending Counsel
- Wilfrid Hyde-White as Mr. Hopton
- Henry Oscar as Count Gamba
- Richard Molinas as Gondolier
- Robert Harris as Dallas
- Ronald Adam as Judge
- Archie Duncan as John Murray
- Barry Jones as Colonel Stonhope
- Natalie Moya as Lady Milbanke
- Bernard Rebel as Doctor Bruno
- John Stone as Lord Clark
- Nora Swinburne as Lady Jersey
- John Salew as Samuel Rogers
- Betty Lynne as Signora Segati
- Zena Marshall as Italian Woman

== Production ==
=== Development ===
The film was announced in 1945 by Two Cities with Eric Portman to play the title role (Portman had played Byron on stage). Stewart Granger was mentioned as another possibility. The film was to be written, produced and directed by Terence Young based on the books by Peter Quennell, The Years of Fame and Byron in Italy.

The project was not made but was re-activated when Sydney Box took over Gainsborough Studios in 1946. Box had been considering a film based on Percy Shelley but was also enthusiastic about making one on Byron, who Box greatly admired. He assigned the project to producer Aubrey Baring and director David MacDonald. They greatly reduced Young's script by a half but Box was still dissatisfied with it.

Working with Gainsborough script adviser Paul Holt, Box reconfigured the film to consist of a series of flashbacks about episodes in Byron's life. Box ultimately decided this approach was too derivative of Citizen Kane and made Byron's presence in the film too insubstantial. He then decided to focus the script on Byron's relationship with Teresa Guiccioli but changed his mind with Mai Zetterling who was playing that part was not available.

=== Shooting ===
The lead role was given to Dennis Price, who said during shooting he felt Portman should play the role. Linden Travers later recalled the film as "a pretty interesting thing to do, though I think it needed a wilder type than Dennis Price for Byron. It wasn’t very good but I enjoyed it; I really enjoyed working. I was never terribly nervous, because I never carried the whole film on my shoulders."

Location filming began in Italy in October 1947. They returned in December. It was followed by shooting in Shepherd's Bush studio. Filming was done by April.

A Nottingham City librarian refused permission for the filmmakers to shoot at Newstead Abbey because of Byron's reputation. Sydney Box called it "an example of bureaucracy at its worst."

Great effort and much money was spent to ensure the film was as historically accurate as possible in terms of sets and costumes. It was not shot in colour as to do so would have increased its budget by a third, and also as colour cameras were being used on the film The Blue Lagoon. A huge set was built at Shepherds Bush. Filming took eleven weeks.

Before the film was released, the US announced they would not allow the film to be screened there because of the relationship between Byron and his half-sister, even though it was not featured in the film.

Sydney Box later heard a radio play about Byron, The Trial of Lord Byron by Laurence Kitchin which he thought would tie up some loose ends of the film. It consisted of Byron being hauled before a celestial court and forced to justify his actions. Box bought the rights to the radio play and had David MacDonald shoot 22 minutes of retakes in two days.

=== Post Production ===
Alfred Roome was assigned to work on the film as associate producer and said he recut it as it "was so bad the first time. It wasn’t the editor’s fault; the director, David MacDonald, had just let it run, pages of stuff without any cuts. I did all sorts of tricks with it — bits of Byron’s poetry, travel shots — but it was an unsaveable film."

== Reception ==
=== Critical ===
The movie received bad reviews. Dennis Price later said "One day I hope to have enough money to make another Byron film — the real story. And if I could get hold of all the scenes we shot and which never appeared in the film, two-thirds of the job would be done."

A critic for Time Out has written of the film:

Not as bad as its reputation would suggest, since it is well acted and stylishly shot, but the script is undeniably silly. Starting with Byron (Price) dying in Greece, it cuts to a celestial trial at which the women in his life appear to give evidence, their stories being seen in flashback. The fatuous point is to determine whether Byron is a great poet and fighter for liberty or a bad, evil rake. Very basic stuff, historically inaccurate and not made any more convincing by the eventual revelation that the judge is Byron himself (though his lines have hitherto been delivered by someone else).

=== Box-office ===
The film was a box-office disaster. By the end of its theatrical first-run release, in 1953, it had earned £75,000, recording a loss of £179,200. According to one account, the producer's receipts were £31,200 in the UK and £13,500 overseas.

Muriel Box recalled it was the film "that cost us most money" although it "was meticulously researched and several authors worked on it; Dennis Price was very good as Byron, but people didn't go for it. I could understand the academics wanting something more literary, but you couldn’t have more of that if you wanted mass audiences. I thought it was a reasonable saga of his life, and was very disappointed because we worked like stink on it."

== Book ==
Sydney Box and Vivian Cox wrote a book on the making of the film, The Bad Lord Byron, which was published in 1949 by Convoy Publications in London.
