= Henry Verey =

British barrister

Sir Henry William Verey (29 December 1836 – 4 December 1920) was a British barrister. He was Official Referee of the Supreme Court of Judicature, and The Times noted that the number of times his judgements were reversed on appeal "can be counted on one's fingers".

== Biography ==
Born on 29 December 1836, Henry Verey was educated at Bedford School, between 1847 and 1855, and at Trinity College, Cambridge, where he was an Exhibitioner and graduated in Mathematics in 1859. He was called to the Bar in 1865 as a member of Inner Temple. In 1876, when the office of Official Referee of the Supreme Court of Judicature was created, Verey was appointed by the Lord Chancellor, Lord Cairns. He was attacked in Parliament and the press as being unsuitable, as were the three other Official Referees.

He held the office for 44 years, until 1920, described by the Lord Chancellor, Lord Birkenhead, as probably a record in the annals of judicial appointments.

Sir Henry Verey was invested as a Knight Bachelor in 1920. He died on 4 December 1920, aged 84, at his home, Bridge House, in Twyford in Berkshire.

He was the grandfather of the actor Dennis Price, through his only daughter, Dorothy Patience, who married Thomas Rose Caradoc Price.
