= They Who Dare =

1954 British film by Lewis Milestone

- Film poster
- Directed by: Lewis Milestone
- Written by: Robert Westerby
- Produced by: Aubrey Baring; Maxwell Setton
- Starring: Dirk Bogarde; Denholm Elliott; Akim Tamiroff
- Cinematography: Wilkie Cooper
- Edited by: Vladimir Sagovsky
- Music by: Robert Gill
- Production company: Mayflower Productions
- Distributed by: British Lion Films
- Release date: 2 February 1954
- Running time: 107 minutes
- Country: United Kingdom
- Language: English
- Box office: £132,074 (UK)

They Who Dare is a 1954 British Second World War war film directed by Lewis Milestone and starring Dirk Bogarde, Denholm Elliott and Akim Tamiroff. It was released by British Lion Films and in the United States by Allied Artists. The story is based on Operation Anglo that took place during World War II in the Dodecanese islands where special forces attempted to disrupt the Luftwaffe and Regia Aeronautica from threatening Allied forces in Egypt. The title of the film is a reference to the motto of the Special Air Service: "Who Dares Wins".

== Plot ==
During the Second World War, Lieutenant Graham is sent on a mission to destroy two Italian airfields on Rhodes that may threaten Egypt. Under his command, a group of six Special Boat Service, two Greek officers and two local guides are assembled.

The group is taken to Rhodes by submarine and comes ashore at night on a desolate beach. From there, the group has to traverse the mountains to reach its targets. At a pre-designated location, the party splits into two raiding parties. After having infiltrated the air bases, they blow up the aircraft, but two of the raiders are taken prisoner by the Italians.

Hunted by the many enemy patrols, eight of the group are captured and only two, Lieutenant Graham and Sergeant Corcoran, make it back to the pick-up point where they are rescued by the submarine, despite the presence of an unwelcome enemy patrol boat.

== Cast ==
- Dirk Bogarde as Lieut. Graham
- Denholm Elliott as Sgt. Corcoran
- Akim Tamiroff as Captain George One
- Harold Siddons as Lieut. Stevens R.N.
- Eric Pohlmann as Captain Papadapoulos
- William Russell as Lieutenant Poole (credited as Russell Enoch)
- Gérard Oury as Captain George Two
- Sam Kydd as Marine Boyd
- Peter Burton as Marine Barrett
- David Peel as Sgt. Evans
- Michael Mellinger as Toplis
- Alec Mango as Patroklis
- Anthea Leigh as Marika
- Eileen Way as Greek woman
- Lisa Gastoni as George Two's girlfriend
- Kay Callard as nightclub singer
- Robert Rietty as Italian officer
- Christopher Rhodes as German officer

== Production ==
They Who Dare was partly shot on location in Cyprus and Malta with Walter Milner Barry, a former SBS officer as technical adviser. A survivor of the raid, David Sutherland, provided a copy of his after action report to screenwriter Robert Westerby. The interiors were shot at Shepperton Studios near London. The film's sets were designed by the art director Donald M. Ashton.

They Who Dare was re-written by Lewis Milestone. When he handed in the film, producer Setton re-edited it. The film was poorly received critically. Dirk Bogarde recalled one film reviewer referred to it as How Dare They in his review.

The Lebanese Air Force provided a pair of Savoia-Marchetti SM.79 aircraft for the film. Bogarde recalled Lewis Milestone insisting on the cast wearing actual 90 pound/40 kilogram backpacks as he felt actors could not convincingly act as if they were carrying a large amount of weight. The cast had a week of exercises with the packs as the script was polished but the weight was reduced to 60 lbs/27 kg.

== Critical reception ==
The Monthly Film Bulletin wrote:

Any film made by Lewis Milestone on the subject of war is bound to be approached with interest, and this, his second British film, with a theme not unlike that of A Walk in the Sun [1945], perhaps particularly so. But They Who Dare is a disappointment both as an adventure story and as a study of a small group of men under strain. On the adventure story level, the film seems too often vague and implausible in detail – in the sequence of the attack on the airfield, for instance, or the final episode of the rescue by submarine. Only in the scenes of the escape over the mountains is a certain authentic tension generated. The film, though, also has pretensions to be considered as a serious study of men in action. Here the emphasis is placed on the hostility between Graham, uncertain of himself but prepared to take risks "for the kick", and Corcoran, established as an "intellectual" by the fact that he reads poetry aloud. Dirk Bogarde and Denholm Elliott play these parts without much conviction, and the latter's hysterical outburst on the beach strikes a singularly false note; a superficial and indecisive script seems largely to blame. ... Lewis Milestone has always been one of the more uneven of the major Hollywood directors, and They Who Dare indicates, as other films have done, the extent to which he depends on a strong and well-constructed script.

Hal Erickson said the film was, "...undeservedly the least-known of director Lewis Milestone's sound films. Set in the Aegean sea during World War II, the film recounts the exploits of Britain's Special Boat Squadron. ... Robert Westerby is credited with the screenplay of They Who Dare, and Lewis Milestone insisted the story was taken verbatim from the reminiscences of the squadron's two survivors." (Note: Dirk Bogarde recalled, "the film was improvised as they went along.")

British film critic Leslie Halliwell said: "Grimmish war actioner with plenty of noise but not much holding power."

In British Sound Films: The Studio Years 1928–1959 David Quinlan rated the film as "good", writing: "Tense if rather superficial wartime adventure."

The Radio Times Guide to Films gave the film 2/5 stars, writing: "Considering director Lewis Milestone was responsible for those combat classics All Quiet on the Western Front [1930] and A Walk in the Sun, this is a very disappointing account of an allied commando raid on Rhodes. Ordered to knock out a couple of airfields, Dirk Bogarde and Denholm Elliott spend as much time squabbling as they do confronting the enemy. The dialogue (much of which was improvised) is sloppy, but the action sequences are convincing."

== See also ==
- Ill Met by Moonlight (film)
