= Cone of Silence (film) =

1960 British film by Charles Frend

- Theatrical poster
- Directed by: Charles Frend
- Written by: Robert Westerby; David Beaty (novel)
- Produced by: Aubrey Baring
- Starring: Michael Craig; Peter Cushing; George Sanders; Bernard Lee
- Cinematography: Arthur Grant
- Edited by: Max Benedict
- Music by: Gerard Schurmann
- Production company: Aubrey Baring Productions
- Distributed by: Bryanston Films
- Release date: 22 May 1960
- Running time: 88 minutes
- Country: United Kingdom
- Language: English
- Budget: £139,360

Cone of Silence (also known as Trouble in the Sky in the United States) is a 1960 British drama film directed by Charles Frend and starring Michael Craig, Peter Cushing, George Sanders and Bernard Lee. The film is based upon the novel of that name by David Beaty, which is loosely based on a 1952 plane crash in Rome and subsequent investigations into the structural integrity of the de Havilland Comet airliner.

The title refers to a technical term used in the low-frequency radio range. An identification of a range's cone of silence is shown early in the film.

== Plot ==
Captain George Gort is a pilot for British Empire Airways, flying the London—Rome—Cairo—Ranjibad—Calcutta—Singapore route. He is found to have been at fault after his Phoenix 1 jetliner crashed on takeoff from Ranjibad airport, killing his copilot. He is accused of rotating too early, increasing drag to such an extent that the aircraft could not achieve flying speed.

Gort is reprimanded and reduced in seniority but is allowed to return to flying the Phoenix after a check flight under captain Hugh Dallas. Meanwhile, Gort's daughter Charlotte refuses to believe that he was at fault. Gort's flying skills are again called into question when a piece of hedge is found wrapped around an undercarriage leg after an unusually low approach to Calcutta, although the problem appears to have been caused by the nervous captain Clive Judd, who was in the cockpit to assess Gort and lowered the flaps too soon.

In similar circumstances to those of the previous accident, Gort crashes at Ranjibad and is killed along with passengers and crew. Later, Dallas is informed by another pilot that in fact there is no hedge at the threshold of the Calcutta runway and that the piece of hedge found in the undercarriage of Gort's flight must have come from Ranjibad, where the takeoff had been flown by Judd. Dallas then discovers that the aircraft's designer had possibly withheld information on potential takeoff difficulties in warm-weather conditions. A third crash at Ranjibad is avoided by seconds when a message from the aircraft designer comes through to a crew about to take off in the same problematic weather conditions, advising them to add eight knots to the calculated unstick speed and keep the nose wheel on the ground until just before unstick speed is reached. The takeoff is successful, and Gort is exonerated posthumously.

== Cast ==
- Michael Craig as Captain Hugh Dallas
- Peter Cushing as Captain Clive Judd
- Bernard Lee as Captain George Gort
- Elizabeth Seal as Charlotte Gort
- George Sanders as Sir Arnold Hobbes
- André Morell as Captain Edward Manningham
- Gordon Jackson as Captain Bateson
- Charles Tingwell as Captain Braddock
- Noel Willman as Nigel Pickering
- Delphi Lawrence as Joyce Mitchell
- Marne Maitland as Mr. Robinson
- William Abney as First Officer
- Jack Hedley as First Officer
- Simon Lack as Navigator
- Howard Pays as Steward
- Ballard Berkeley as Commissioner
- Charles Lloyd-Pack as Commissioner

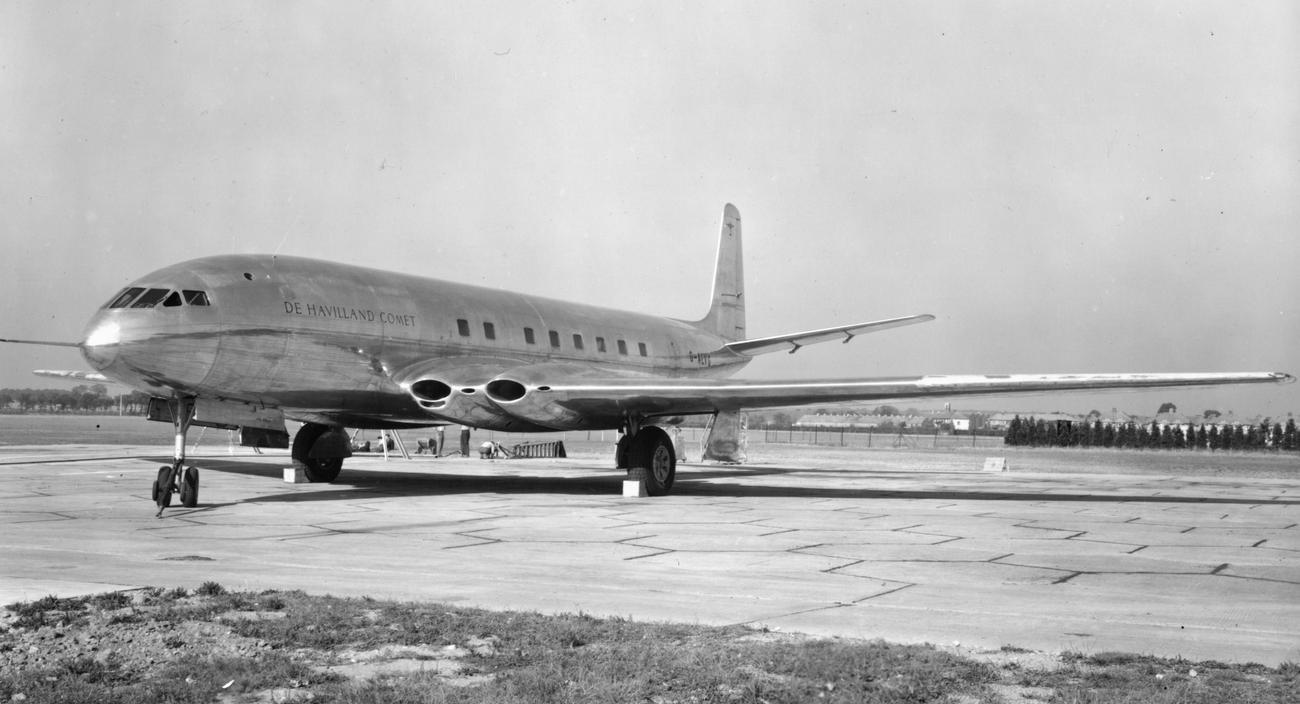
The film was loosely based on a series of de Havilland Comet crashes.

== Production ==
Cone of Silence was based on David Beaty's novel Cone of Silence (1959). Beaty was a former military and commercial pilot with BOAC who became an expert on human error in aviation accidents. After beginning a writing career with his first novels based on aviation themes, Beaty returned to college to acquire his degree in psychology and became a civil servant in 1967. He wrote his first nonfiction work, The Human Factor in Aircraft Accidents, in 1969, and later wrote other works before he returned to the subject of his first nonfiction book in The Naked Pilot: The Human Factor in Aircraft Accidents (1991). The film Cone of Silence represented his concern that human factors were being ignored in the aviation industry.

Budgetary constraints caused the use of miniatures to depict airfields and aircraft, although principal photography took place at Filton Airport in North Bristol with the cooperation of the Bristol Siddeley Engines Ltd. The majority of the film was shot on the sound stages at Shepperton Studios.

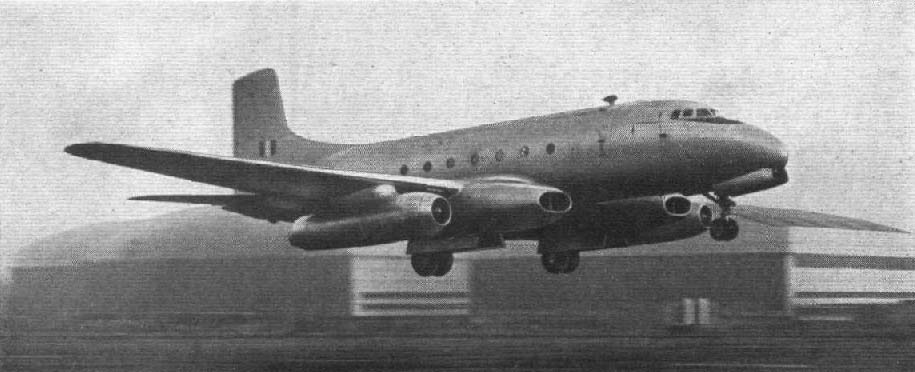
Avro Ashton as the Atlas Aviation Phoenix 1 airliner.

Aubrey Baring provided £16,060 to the budget.

=== Representation of the airliner in the film ===
The film's Phoenix airliner is represented by the Avro Ashton WB493, in use since 1955 as a testbed by the engine manufacturer Bristol Siddeley. The real aircraft, named the Olympus-Ashton, was powered by two Olympus turbojet podded underwing engines in addition to four Nenes mounted in the standard wing root location. For its starring role as the Phoenix airliner, the Olympus-Ashton was painted in a special livery to represent the fictional Atlas Aviation. It is the only full-scale aircraft seen in the film.

Severin released the blu-ray edition of this film in the box set Cushing Curiosities in November 2023, loaded with extras and for the first time on home video in the correct 2.35:1 aspect ratio.

== Reception ==
=== Critical ===
In a contemporary review, critic Patrick Gibbs of The Daily Telegraph wrote that "[f]ew flying films have taken us so intelligently into the air as Cone of Silence" but lamented that "Mystery set against a realistic background rather than melodrama seems to me the form which would have suited this subject best ... As it is, good opportunities have been not so much missed as grabbed too greedily. Legitimate excitement has been overlaid by the spurious, for which the director (Charles Frend) and the writer (Robert Westerby) would seem equally to blame."

A contemporary reviewer for The Guardian wrote: "[The film] begins in a court room where the drama fails to take off and instead becomes bogged down in technical details. It would make a subject for a Peter Sellers parody. ... The climax is a long time in coming, and after the technicalities of the opening the solution is too easily arrived at and laymanish. It is a film in black and white in both senses; there is no colour, which is always missed in a flying film, and the plot divides the people too obviously into goodies and baddies."

After the film's 1961 release in the United States under the title Trouble in the Sky, Maxine Dowling of the New York Daily News wrote: "There are some exciting moments but they are few and far between. ... All this cast needed was a better script."

=== Box office ===
Cone of Silence lost Bryanston Films £32,348.

== See also ==
- No Highway in the Sky
