= Cairo Road (film) =

1950 British film by David MacDonald

- British theatrical poster
- Directed by: David MacDonald
- Written by: Robert Westerby
- Produced by: Aubrey Baring; Maxwell Setton
- Starring: Eric Portman; Laurence Harvey; Maria Mauban; Harold Lang
- Music by: Robert Gill
- Production company: Mayflower Productions
- Distributed by: Associated British-Pathé (UK)
- Release date: 21 May 1950
- Running time: 95 minutes
- Country: United Kingdom
- Language: English
- Budget: £108,000
- Box office: £145,502 (UK)

Cairo Road is a 1950 British crime film directed by David MacDonald and starring Eric Portman, Laurence Harvey, Maria Mauban, Harold Lang and John Gregson. It was written by Robert Westerby.

== Plot ==
A team of Egyptian anti-narcotic agents led by Colonel Youssef Bey, the chief of the Anti-Narcotic Bureau, and his new assistant Lieutenant Mourad, recently relocated from Paris with his wife Marie, try to prevent shipments of drugs crossing the southern Egyptian border. They are constantly on alert as even camel caravans are suspect in smuggling narcotics.

The agents are investigating the murder of a rich Arab businessman named Bashiri. Raiding a berthed ship in the harbour of Port Saïd leads them to the trail of heroin smugglers, including Rico Pavlis and Lombardi. One of the police agents, Anna Michelis, is targeted by the smugglers.

Eventually Pavlis turns on his partner, killing Lombardi, but Youssef sets a trap for the Pavlis brothers, and the capture of the two remaining criminal gang leaders and their men, proves the police are competent at stemming the flow of narcotics.

== Cast ==
- Eric Portman as Colonel Youssef Bey
- Laurence Harvey as Lieutenant Mourad
- Maria Mauban as Marie
- Harold Lang as Humble/Rico Pavlis
- Grégoire Aslan as Lombardi
- Karel Stepanek as Edouardo Pavlis
- John Bailey as Doctor
- Camelia as Anna Michelis
- Martin Boddey as Major Ahmed Mustafa
- John Gregson as Coast guard
- Marne Maitland as Gohari
- John Harvey as Major Maggoury
- Abraham Sofaer as Commandant
- Peter Jones as Ship's Lieutenant

== Production ==
The film was based on real cases worked on by the Egyptian police. Producer Maxwell Setton had been born in Cairo. It was originally known as Poison Road and was made with the co-operation of the Egyptian government.

The production was centred around Egypt where principal photography took place, and its cast included Egyptian film star Camelia, who died in 1950 in an aircraft crash.

== Reception ==
=== Box office ===
The film returned £112,000 to the producers meaning it made a profit.

=== Critical ===
The Monthly Film Bulletin wrote: "A thriller with oriental flavouring, stock characterisations and clumsy handling. Adequate location work."

The New York Times called it an "unpretentious and consistently sensible little film ... British restraint and taste not only have saved the day but succeeded in dignifying a battered subject ... this routine picture has some sterling ingredients."

Variety wrote "action moves slowly in the first half and much of the story is veiled so as to obscure the plot. However, it winds up with a meaty climax."

In the Time Out Film Guide by Trevor Johnston, Cairo Road is described as "a workaday thriller, whose makers actually took the trouble to go to Cairo and Port Said to shoot it. Twenty-something Harvey makes an early appearance as Inspector Portman's bumbling, keen-as-mustard assistant."

Leslie Halliwell wrote "Oddly cast, reasonably lively but routine police adventure in an unfamiliar setting."

In The Radio Times Guide to Films Adrian Turner gave the film 2/5 stars, writing: "While Portman rather overplays his part, Harvey is fascinating to watch as a scene-stealing star on the rise. Despite some location sequences (a rarity for a low budget production), the action is fairly slow and routine."
