= Helen Montagu =

Australian theatre producer

- Born: April 21, 1928; Sydney, Australia
- Died: January 1, 2004 (aged 75); London, England
- Education: Sydney University
- Occupations: Producer and actress
- Spouse: Russell Willett
- Children: 4

Helen Margaret Montagu (21 April 1928 – 1 January 2004) was an Australian stage producer, actress, and impresaria in London. She was the first woman to become a major West End producer.

Montagu was born in Sydney, daughter of an Australian banker. She attended Sydney University, where she met her future husband, a psychologist named Russell Willett; the couple married in 1953. They had four children. Montagu enrolled in London's Central School of Speech and Drama and worked as an actress briefly before going to work at the Royal Court in 1965 as a casting director. Later she was named general manager. In the 1970s she left the Royal Court. In 1975 she was named as the managing director of H. M. Tennent, basically a repertory company, presenting The Seagull and The Bed Before Yesterday on alternate weeks with largely overlapping casts at the Lyric Theatre. Two years later she became head of Backstage Productions, later establishing her own eponymous company, Helen Montagu Productions.

She was the Royal Court Theatre general manager in the 1960s. On one occasion, the night when the French ambassador went to see Madeleine Renaud performing in Beckett's Oh, Les Beaux Jours, she received an anonymous phone call after curtain up warning of a possible bomb on the premises, but she did nothing, and told no one. "I can't turn these people out. It would have been silly", she later commented.

She produced musicals, including a musical version of Prisoner: Cell Block H, as well as a production of The Who's Tommy, in addition to reworking classics such as Chekhov's The Seagull, and introducing new innovative or original productions (The Elocution of Benjamin Franklin and The Bed Before Yesterday).

Montagu died, aged 75, from undisclosed causes in London on New Year's Day, 2004.
