= The Spider and the Fly (1949 film) =

1949 British film directed by Robert Hamer

- Directed by: Robert Hamer
- Written by: Robert Westerby
- Produced by: Aubrey Baring; Maxwell Setton
- Starring: Eric Portman; Guy Rolfe; Nadia Gray
- Cinematography: Geoffrey Unsworth
- Edited by: Seth Holt
- Music by: Georges Auric
- Production companies: Mayflower Productions; Pinewood Films
- Distributed by: General Film Distributors
- Release dates: 1 December 1949 (UK); 1952 (US)
- Running time: 92 minutes
- Country: United Kingdom
- Language: English
- Budget: £120,000

The Spider and the Fly is a 1949 British crime film directed by Robert Hamer and starring Eric Portman, Guy Rolfe and Nadia Gray. The screenplay concerns an unusual love triangle that develops between two criminals and a policeman on the eve of the First World War. It was written by Robert Westerby. Hamer made it immediately after Kind Hearts and Coronets (1949).

== Plot ==
In 1913, Fernand Maubert, the dedicated chief of police of Paris, is pursuing Philippe Ledocq, a suave bank robber and burglar suspected of a series of thefts, but the criminal always has an alibi. After the latest robbery, Maubert captures Ledocq's accomplice, Madeleine Saincaise.

When she is released from prison, Maubert warns her to stay away from Ledocq (though he has a certain admiration for the man). Impressed by her intelligence, beauty and courage, he begins to court her himself. When Ledocq visits her, she professes her love for him, but he tells her that it is too dangerous for them to be seen together and that they would eventually tire of each other anyway. Later, however, during one of their cordial occasional meetings, Maubert tells Ledocq that he can tell that Madeleine is different from Ledocq's other women; she has got under his skin.

Later, the police are tipped off by an informant and arrive during an attempted theft. Ledocq gets away, but his assistant Jean Louis is killed, along with a policeman. Ledocq persuades Madeleine to provide him with an alibi. Maubert knows she is lying, but cannot prove it. However, stops seeing her.

Finally, Maubert gets the break he has been waiting for. Ledocq employs Jean Louis's brother Alfred for his next theft. Maubert gets Alfred to betray Ledocq, not out of revenge for his brother's death, but by telling him falsely that Ledocq did not give his mother Jean's fair share of the loot. Ledocq is imprisoned just as World War I breaks out.

During the war, Maubert becomes a major in French counterintelligence. When the Minister of War tells him that they urgently need a list of German spies in France which is kept in a safe in the German embassy in neutral Bern, Switzerland, Maubert states there is only one man for the job. Maubert is authorised to offer a pardon to Ledocq in exchange for his services. The prisoner agrees after Maubert dangles the prospect of seeing Madeleine.

The theft goes off without a hitch. However, when Ledocq goes to Madeleine's flat, he finds a despondent Maubert already there. In a surprise twist, it turns out that Madeleine's name was on the list they stole. She is taken away, with the implication that she will be executed for treason. In the final scene, Maubert watches Ledocq, now an anonymous French soldier, board a train for the intense fighting at Verdun, both knowing that Ledocq stands little chance of survival.

== Cast ==
- Eric Portman as Fernand Maubert
- Guy Rolfe as Philippe de Ledocq
- Nadia Gray as Madeleine Saincaize
- George Cole as Marc, Maubert's assistant
- John Carol as Jean Louis & Alfred Louis
- Harold Lang as Belfort, an informant
- Edward Chapman as Minister for War
- Maurice Denham as Colonel de la Roche, the Minister's aide
- John Salew as the Minister's Secretary
- May Hallatt as Monique
- James Hayter as Mayor
- Arthur Lowe as Town Clerk
- Patrick Young as Captain le Maitre
- Sebastian Cabot as Prefect at Amiens
- Jeremy Spenser as Jacques
- Madge Brindley as Jacques' grandmother
- Keith Pyott as Father Pletsier
- Natasha Sokolova as Nicole Porte
- Philip Stainton as café owner
- Hal Osmond as Swiss taxi driver
- Alastair Hunter as watchman at legation
- Hattie Jacques as café barmaid (uncredited)
- Iris Vandeleur as cleaning lady (uncredited)

== Production ==
It was the first film from the producing team of Maxwell Setton and Aubrey Baring, who set up their operation at Mayflower Productions. Mayflower had been established by Charles Laughton and Eric Pommer in the 1930s and made three films but became dormant with the advent of World War Two. Setton and Baring decided to re-activate the company and the two men would make six movies together, most of which were written by Robert Westerby, who wrote The Spider and the Fly. Mayflower received a government grant to underwrite part of the cost.

Robert Westerby's story was based on a true story which he had been told by a member of the French police.

In October 1948 Alfred Hitchcock announced that he would make three films for Transatlantic Pictures after he finished Under Capricorn: I Confess, Dark Duty and The Spider and the Fly.

The leads were Eric Portman, Nadia Gray and Guy Rolfe. It was Eric Portman's first film in over a year, during which time he enjoyed a great success on stage in a double bill of Terence Rattigan plays called Playbill. Nadia Gray was a Romanian actor who had spent part of the war in a German concentration camp; she was cast in the film partly due to her appearance on the Paris stage in a production of Noël Coward's Present Laughter (she was seen by Anthony Havelock-Allan who recommended her). It was Guy Rolfe's third leading role.

Filming started in May 1949 and took place in Paris over three weeks, then at Pinewood Studios in London. Sets were by the art director Edward Carrick. The period costumes were designed partly by Elizabeth Haffenden. It was Seth Holt's first film as lead editor, although he had worked as an assistant for a number of years.

== Reception ==
The Monthly Film Bulletin said "The film falls between melodrama and something deeper – a study of human relationships. Though there are some tense scenes, it is as a whole not sufficiently exciting for a thriller, and Hamer's bitter intelligence is not quite sharp enough for a real drama of character."
