= Oswald Morris =

British cinematographer (1915–2014)

Oswald Morris OBE
- Born: Oswald Norman Morris; 22 November 1915; Ruislip, Middlesex, England
- Died: 17 March 2014 (aged 98); Fontmell Magna, Dorset, England
- Occupation: Cinematographer
- Years active: 1932–1982
- Children: 3

Oswald Norman Morris, OBE DFC AFC BSC (22 November 1915 – 17 March 2014) was a British cinematographer. Known to his colleagues by the nicknames "Os" or "Ossie", Morris's career in cinematography spanned six decades.

== Life and career ==
Morris was raised in Middlesex (now the London borough of Hillingdon) and attended the Bishopshalt School. His interest in film began at an early age; during summer vacations, he would work as a projectionist at the local cinema. After leaving school in 1932, he began working in the film industry at Wembley Studios as an unpaid gofer for Michael Powell, among others, eventually graduating to the positions of clapper boy and camera assistant on quota quickies. By his 20s, Morris was a camera operator, first at Wembley, and later at Elstree Studios.

His career was interrupted by World War II, during which he served as a radio operator and navigator before becoming a bomber pilot with the Royal Air Force, flying Lancaster bomber raids over Italy, France and Germany. He completed 30 operations before being transferred to Transport Command for the duration of the war. Prior to his discharge and the resumption of his career, Morris participated in the Berlin Airlift. He achieved the rank of flight lieutenant and winning both the Distinguished Flying Cross and the Air Force Cross.

After his war service, Morris worked at Pinewood Studios as an assistant to such people as Ronald Neame and David Lean at their company, Cineguild. He was the camera operator for Lean's Oliver Twist (1948). He first acted as director of photography on Golden Salamander (1950). Neame called Morris "probably the greatest cameraman in the world."

Morris collaborated with director John Huston on eight films, beginning with Moulin Rouge (1952) and also including Moby Dick (1956). Although his previous experience with Technicolor had been limited, Morris devised many stylish effects for Moulin Rouge by employing diffused and filtered light, fog and bold color choices, and his innovations drew critical praise. For Moby Dick, Morris developed what David Peloquin has called a "retro-silvered pictorial" that "was designed to capture the look of nineteenth-century whaling prints with their muted colors and silver sheen." Morris wrote in his autobiography that he and Huston wanted a "soft wash" effect "in which we would etch in the characters." To achieve this, in prints for the original release, colour was effectively printed over a black-and-white image using two negatives. As cinematographer for John Osborne's The Entertainer (1960), his name was incorporated into the story in a scene in which a radio transmission mentions the fictional 'Sergeant Ossie Morris'.

Morris received three nominations for the Academy Award for Best Cinematography for his work on the musicals Oliver! (1968), Fiddler on the Roof (1971) and The Wiz (1978), winning for Fiddler on the Roof. Morris' brother Reginald H. Morris was also a cinematographer based in Canada.

Morris was a fellow of the Royal Photographic Society and was named an officer of the Order of the British Empire in 1998. He published his memoirs, Huston, We Have a Problem: A Kaleidoscope of Filmmaking Memories (ISBN 978-0810857063), in 2006. In his later years, Morris participated in a film course at Bournemouth University.

Morris was married twice. His first marriage to the former Connie Sharp produced three children, Gillian, Christine and Roger. The marriage lasted from 1939 until she died in 1963. In 1966, Morris married Lee Turner, a member of the continuity production staff on the Franco Zeffirelli film of The Taming of the Shrew (1967). This marriage lasted until she died in 2003.

Morris was among the interviewees in the book Conversations with Cinematographers by David A. Ellis.

Morris died on March 17, 2014, at the age of 98 at his home in Fontmell Magna, Dorset, England. His survivors included his three children, 10 grandchildren, and 18 great-grandchildren.

== Honours ==
In June 2009, the recently completed central building of the National Film and Television School was officially named the Oswald Morris Building in his honour.

== Additional credits ==
- The Card (1952)
- Moulin Rouge (1952)
- So Little Time (1952)
- Beat the Devil (1953)
- South of Algiers (1953)
- Beau Brummell (1954)
- The Man Who Never Was (1956)
- Moby Dick (1956)
- Heaven Knows, Mr. Allison (1957)
- A Farewell to Arms (1957)
- Look Back in Anger (1959)
- The Entertainer (1960)
- Our Man in Havana (1960)
- The Guns of Navarone (1961)
- Lolita (1962)
- The Pumpkin Eater (1964)
- Of Human Bondage (1964)
- Mister Moses (1965)
- The Battle of the Villa Fiorita (1965)
- The Hill (1965)
- Life at the Top (1965)
- The Spy Who Came in from the Cold (1965)
- Reflections in a Golden Eye (1967)
- The Taming of the Shrew (1967)
- Oliver! (1968)
- Goodbye, Mr. Chips (1969)
- Scrooge (1970)
- Fiddler on the Roof (1971)
- Sleuth (1972)
- Lady Caroline Lamb (1972)
- The Mackintosh Man (1973)
- Dracula (1974)
- The Man with the Golden Gun (1974)
- The Odessa File (1974)
- The Man Who Would Be King (1975)
- Equus (1977)
- The Seven-Per-Cent Solution (1977)
- The Wiz (1978)
- Just Tell Me What You Want (1980)
- The Great Muppet Caper (1981)
- The Dark Crystal (1982)

== Awards and nominations ==
- 1953 British Society of Cinematographers Golden Camera (Moulin Rouge, winner)
- 1956 British Society of Cinematographers Golden Camera (Moby Dick, nominee)
- 1965 BAFTA for Best British Cinematography, Black-and-White (The Pumpkin Eater, winner)
- 1966 British Society of Cinematographers Golden Camera (The Spy Who Came in from the Cold, winner)
- 1966 BAFTA for Best British Cinematography, Black-and-White (The Hill, winner)
- 1967 British Society of Cinematographers Golden Camera (The Taming of the Shrew, winner)
- 1967 BAFTA for Best British Cinematography, Black-and-White (The Spy Who Came in from the Cold, winner)
- 1969 Academy Award for Best Cinematography (Oliver!, nominee)
- 1971 British Society of Cinematographers Golden Camera (Fiddler on the Roof, winner)
- 1972 Academy Award for Best Cinematography (Fiddler on the Roof, winner)
- 1972 BAFTA for Best Cinematography (Fiddler on the Roof, nominee)
- 1974 BAFTA for Best Cinematography (Sleuth, nominee)
- 1976 BAFTA for Best Cinematography (The Man Who Would Be King, nominee)
- 1979 Academy Award for Best Cinematography (The Wiz, nominee)
- 1999 American Society of Cinematographers International Award (winner)
