= Appointment in London =

1953 British film by Philip Leacock

- Original cinema poster
- Directed by: Philip Leacock
- Screenplay by: John Wooldridge; Robert Westerby
- Story by: John Wooldridge
- Produced by: Aubrey Baring; Maxwell Setton
- Starring: Dirk Bogarde; Ian Hunter; Dinah Sheridan
- Cinematography: Stephen Dade
- Edited by: V. Sagovsky
- Music by: John Wooldridge
- Production companies: Mayflower Productions; British Lion
- Distributed by: British Lion Films (UK)
- Release date: 17 February 1953 (UK)
- Running time: 96 minutes
- Country: United Kingdom
- Language: English
- Budget: £125,689

Appointment in London (known as Raiders in the Sky in the U.S.) is a 1953 British war film set during the Second World War and starring Dirk Bogarde. The film was directed by Philip Leacock and based on a story by John Wooldridge, who as an RAF bomber pilot flew 108 operational sorties over Europe. Wooldridge, who after the war established himself as a successful film composer before his untimely death in a car accident, also wrote the film score and participated in writing the screenplay.

The film is set in an RAF Bomber Command squadron during 1943 and tells of a wing commander's attempt to finish his third and final tour of 30 operations. A sub-plot involves his relationship with a widowed Wren in whom an American observer attached to his airfield is also interested.

== Plot ==
Wing Commander Tim Mason commands 188 Squadron RAF, a squadron of Avro Lancasters based in England. He is nearing the end of his third tour of operations, meaning that he has flown nearly 90 missions over Germany. Having twice volunteered to continue operational flying, Mason is keen to make it a round 90 "ops", but just as he is nearing the end of his tour he receives orders banning him from further flying. Meanwhile, losses are mounting and several raids are being seen as failures, so that some of the members of his crews, Brown and "The Brat" Greeno among them, are thinking that there must be a "jinx" at work. Soon afterwards, "The Brat" is caught sending unauthorised telegrams off the station. These turn out to be written to his wife, Pam, rather than anything more sinister; however, Mason reprimands Greeno for the lapse in security. A few days later, Greeno's aircraft fails to return from a raid and Mason agrees to meet Pam, who has asked to see him.

With only one more flight to go, he accepts that the decision to ground him was for his own good, and he visits Brown's aircraft as Brown and his crew prepare to take off on a mission. As the crew board the Lancaster the large 4,000lb "cookie" bomb that is part of the bomber's load, slips from the bomb shackles and injures one of the crew. With no time to obtain a replacement crew member, US observer Mac Baker takes his place. Mason decides to go as well, to reassure the crew's worries about the jinx, and the bomber takes off.

During the attack on the target, the Pathfinder plane directing the raid is shot down, causing the remaining bombers to begin bombing inaccurately. Hearing and seeing this, Mason takes the Pathfinder's place on the radio, broadcasting corrections and accurate instructions, and the bombing becomes accurate again. Listening-in to the Pathfinder's broadcast back in Britain, Mason's commanding officer, Group Captain Logan hears Mason's voice and realises that he has disobeyed orders and flown on the operation. However, Mason's intervention turns the raid from a probable failure to a success, so on Mason's return Logan greets him at his aircraft.

At the end of the mission, Mason, along with Eve Canyon, Brown and Greeno's wife Pam, take a taxi to Buckingham Palace to receive an award from King George VI. (Note: This is the "appointment" to which the film's title refers.)

== Main cast ==
- Dirk Bogarde as Wing Commander Tim Mason
- Ian Hunter as Group Captain Logan
- Dinah Sheridan as Eve Canyon
- William Sylvester as Major "Mac" Baker USAAF
- Bryan Forbes as Pilot Officer Peter Greeno ("The Brat")
- Walter Fitzgerald as Dr. Mulvaney, Group Medical Officer
- Bill Kerr as Flight Lieutenant Bill Brown
- Anne Leon as Pam Greeno
- Charles Victor as Dobbie, the innkeeper
- Richard Wattis as Pascal
- Carl Jaffe as German general
- Sam Kydd as Ackroyd
- Terence Longdon as Dr. Buchanan
- Michael Ripper as bomb aimer
- Campbell Singer as Flight Sergeant (Chief of Ground Crews)
- Harold Siddons as Flight Lieutenant Saunders
- Anthony Shaw as "Smithy"
- Anthony Forwood as Sandy (Navigation Officer)

== Production ==
Appointment in London was produced by Aubrey Baring and Maxwell Setton and shot at British Lion's Shepperton Studios and at RAF Upwood. Three of the Lancaster B VII bombers, serial numbers NX673, NX679 and NX782, used in the film, also appeared in The Dam Busters two years later. In some ground shots, several of the "Lancasters" in the background are the later Avro Lincoln bombers, still in service at the time.

The film was made with the co-operation of Bomber Harris.

The music was also written by Wooldridge and performed by the Philharmonia Orchestra under his conducting.

Australian actor Peter Finch was originally to play an Australian character, "Bill Brown". When Finch had to withdraw, due to other commitments, he recommended fellow Australian Bill Kerr, who received the part. Kerr also later played a real, celebrated Australian Lancaster pilot, H. B. "Micky" Martin, in The Dambusters. Another Australian, Don Sharp, had a small role.

== Reception ==
Featuring the use of the wartime Avro Lancaster bomber, because of the aerial scenes, Appointment in London was considered a "realistic, well-done story of RAF Bomber Command in the dark days of 1943." Other contemporary reviews in 1953 focused on the action; The Spectator noted, "sequences rock the heart with glory the terror of it all" and the Daily Mail enthused, "The Lancaster bomber raid which climaxes the film is just about the best treatment of this subject I have seen." The fairly staid plot, nonetheless, was also described as a "run-of-the-mill" story.

=== Box office ===
Despite the British interest during the postwar period in films that chronicled the Second World War, the box office was not strong, and Wooldridge considered it a "dud".

The film was very popular in Australia.

== Bibliography ==
- Coldstream, John. Dirk Bogarde: The Authorised Biography. London: Phoenix, 2005. ISBN 978-0753819852.
- Evans, Alun. Brassey's Guide to War Films. Dulles, Virginia: Potomac Books, 2000. ISBN 1-57488-263-5.
- Garbett, Mike and Brian Goulding. The Lancaster at War. Toronto: Musson Book Company, 1971. ISBN 0-7737-0005-6.
- Harwick, Jack and Ed Schnepf. "A Buff's Guide to Aviation Movies". Air Progress Aviation, Volume 7, No. 1, Spring 1983.
