= South of Algiers =

1953 film by Jack Lee

- U.S. poster
- Directed by: Jack Lee
- Written by: Robert Westerby
- Produced by: Aubrey Baring; Maxwell Setton
- Starring: Van Heflin; Wanda Hendrix; Eric Portman
- Cinematography: Oswald Morris
- Production company: Mayflower Productions
- Distributed by: Associated British-Pathé
- Release dates: 17 March 1953 (UK); 1 March 1954 (U.S.)
- Running time: 88 minutes
- Country: United Kingdom
- Language: English
- Box office: £150,380 (UK)

South of Algiers (U.S. The Golden Mask; also known as Mask of Pharaoh) is a 1953 British travel adventure film, directed by Jack Lee and starring Van Heflin, Wanda Hendrix and Eric Portman. It was written by Robert Westerby and was partly filmed on location in Algeria.

== Plot ==
Doctor Burnet, a scholar of ancient history at the British Museum, is obsessed with finding the legendary and priceless Golden Mask of Moloch, believed to be buried in the lost tomb of a Roman general somewhere in the Algerian desert. He plans his latest expedition of discovery, but lacks funds to pay for an archaeologist to accompany him. He learns from the museum curator that Nicholas Chapman, an American author of popular archaeology books, is eager to go along and work without pay, on the understanding that he will be able to publish his experiences in magazine articles and book form. Burnet is dubious of Chapman's expertise and good-faith, but finally agrees to let him join the party.

Unknown to them, Burnet and Chapman are accompanied on their flight to Algiers by unscrupulous fortune hunter Petris and his sidekick Kress, who are just as keen to get their hands on the mask, but in their case purely for financial reasons.

On arrival in Algiers, Burnet meets up with his daughter Anne and her boyfriend Jacques, whose father is the curator of the local museum of antiquities. Chapman is attracted to Anne, but she finds his forwardness off-putting. They walk around the ruins of Carthage together. Anne's attitude softens when she sees how kind he is to the local children.

That evening, Chapman goes alone to a nightclub, where Kress homes in on him, plies him with drink and introduces him to a sultry belly dancer. After a very enjoyable evening, Chapman returns to his hotel room to find his belongings have been ransacked and his maps stolen.

The Burnet party sets out across the Sahara by camel and are beset by dangers including windstorms and attacks by hostile desert nomads. They finally reach the secret tombs, and narrowly escape with their lives when a roof collapses as they excavate. Petris and Kress show up and force Chapman to reveal the location of the tomb. They hatch a plan to kill Burnet and his party to claim the mask for themselves. However Chapman proves to be more than their match and saves the day.

With Petris and Kress taken care of, the mask is found safely. Anne realises that she has fallen in love with Chapman, while Jacques magnanimously concedes that they make a good pair. Burnet admits that he was wrong to doubt Chapman's credentials, and sets about transferring the mask safely to London.

== Cast ==
- Van Heflin as Nicholas Chapman
- Wanda Hendrix as Anne Burnet
- Eric Portman as Doctor Burnet
- Charles Goldner as Petris
- Jacques B. Brunius as Kress
- Jacques François as Jacques Farnod
- Aubrey Mather as Professor Young
- Simone Silva as Zara
- Marne Maitland as Thankyou
- George Pastell as Hassan
- Alec Mango as Mahmoud

== Production ==
Director Jack Lee said the film "was a piece of old hokum, made almost entirely on location. It was quite fun, but it was all cliche stuff, with goodies and baddies and all those spahis riding around chasing bandits."

== Reception ==
The Monthly Film Bulletin wrote: "This film is notable for its wealth of local colour – the beggar children, the oasis villages, native arts, camels, and desert storms, not to mention a stirring fight between a redcoated army patrol and the bandits force, which is given weight and excitement by its musical score and skilful cutting. ... But the plot is weak and obvious and Eric Portman falls victim to a part to which he cannot do justice. The small part players are the most convincing, notably Marne Maitland in his comic turn as an Arab chauffeur. The film is decidedly uneven, but for the backgrounds worth its makers' journey."
