= Dennis Price =

English actor (1915–1973)

- Price as Jeeves
- Born: Dennistoun John Franklyn Rose Price; 23 June 1915; Ruscombe, England
- Died: 6 October 1973 (aged 58); Guernsey, Channel Islands
- Occupation: Actor
- Years active: 1938–1973
- Spouse: Joan Schofield (m. 1939; div. 1950)
- Children: 2

Dennistoun John Franklyn Rose Price (23 June 1915 – 6 October 1973) was an English actor. He played Louis Mazzini in the Ealing Studios film Kind Hearts and Coronets (1949) and the omnicompetent valet Jeeves in 1960s television adaptations of P. G. Wodehouse's stories.

== Biography ==
=== Early life ===
Price was born in Ruscombe in Berkshire. He had distant Welsh family connections, and was the son of Brigadier-General Thomas Rose Caradoc Price (1875–1949), CMG, DSO (who was a great-grandson of Sir Rose Price, 1st Baronet, and, through his mother, a descendant of the Baillie baronets of Polkemmet, near Whitburn, West Lothian), and his wife Dorothy, née Verey, daughter of Sir Henry Verey, Official referee of the Supreme Court of Judicature. He attended Copthorne Prep School, Radley College and Worcester College, Oxford. He studied acting at the Embassy Theatre School of Acting.

=== Stage actor ===
Price made his first appearance on stage at the Croydon Repertory Theatre in June 1937, followed by a London debut at the Queen's Theatre on 6 September 1937 in Richard II.

He served in the Royal Artillery from March 1940 to June 1942 during the Second World War, but returned to acting after being invalided out, appearing with Noël Coward in This Happy Breed and Present Laughter and later as Charles Condomine in Blithe Spirit, which he later named in Who's Who in the Theatre as one of his two favourite parts along with the title role in André Obey's Noah.

=== Film career ===
Price's first film role was in A Canterbury Tale (1944). He impressed Gainsborough Pictures, which put him under contract. According to Brian MacFarlane, Price was "mercilessly used by Gainsborough [Pictures] in one unsuitable role after another" in this period.

He was given a support role in A Place of One's Own (1945) starring James Mason. British National borrowed him for The Echo Murders (1946), a Sexton Blake film; he was then fourth-billed as the villain in a Gainsborough melodrama, Caravan (1946) with Stewart Granger and Jean Kent, playing the type of villainous part that had made James Mason a star (and that Mason was no longer interested in playing). It was a huge success.

Price was a villain again in Gainsborough's The Magic Bow (1946) with Granger and Kent. Two Cities Films used him in one of its melodramas, Hungry Hill (1947). Gainsborough used him in villainous roles in Dear Murderer, Holiday Camp, Jassy and Master of Bankdam (all 1947).

He made two films for Bernard Knowles, supporting Margaret Lockwood in The White Unicorn and a comedy, Easy Money (both 1948). He followed this with a thriller, Snowbound, and a crime melodrama Good-Time Girl (both 1948). In 1948, British exhibitors voted Price the tenth-most popular British actor at the box office.

=== Stardom ===
He was promoted to starring roles. He was given the title role in The Bad Lord Byron (1949); this was a huge flop at the box-office, and helped kill off the Gainsborough melodrama. Much more successful, both at the box-office and among critics, was Kind Hearts and Coronets (1949), for Ealing Films; he played the suave serial murderer Louis Mazzini with Alec Guinness playing his eight relatives.

Price was in a wartime drama, The Lost People (1949). In the same year, he was a guest judge on a BBC radio broadcast of the Piddingtons show. His role was to represent the eyes of listeners as the Piddingtons performed their telepathy act in the Piccadilly studios, and in the Tower of London. He was ensuring that no cheating was going on and overseeing the telepathy tests as a witness.

He was loaned to Associated British Picture Corporation (ABPC) to make two films: the musical The Dancing Years (1950), a sizeable hit; and the thriller Murder Without Crime (1950), was less successful.

Back at Rank, Price was a villain in The Adventurers, and was borrowed by 20th Century Fox for I'll Never Forget You (both 1951).

He played the lead in Lady Godiva Rides Again (1951), and after a cameo in The Magic Box (1951) he had top billing in a comedy, Song of Paris (1952).

=== Supporting actor ===
Price supported in The Tall Headlines (1952) and had the lead in some B-films: Noose for a Lady (1953), Murder at 3am (1953) and Time Is My Enemy (1954). In "A" pictures he was now a supporting actor, with his films including The Intruder (1953), For Better, for Worse (1954), That Lady (1955), Oh... Rosalinda!! (1955), Private's Progress (1956), Charley Moon (1956) with Max Bygraves, Port Afrique (1956), A Touch of the Sun (1956), Fortune Is a Woman (1957), The Naked Truth (1957), Danger Within (1959), I'm All Right Jack (1959), and School for Scoundrels (1960). He was top billed in Don't Panic Chaps! (1959), a minor comedy made by Hammer Films.

In the 1950s, Price appeared in London and New York City in new plays and revivals of classics. It has been suggested that he was the first name actor on television to play a "more or less overtly gay role" in Crime on Our Hands (1954). In 1957, he made his debut in South Africa in lead roles in Separate Tables.

As a radio actor, Price was the original "No. 1" in charge of the crew of HMS Troutbridge in the first series of the long-running radio comedy series The Navy Lark in 1959, but was unable to continue the role in the second series because of other work commitments; he was replaced by Stephen Murray. His film appearances from this period included Tunes of Glory (1960) and The Amorous Prawn (also known as The Playgirl and the War Minister, 1962). In Victim (1961) he portrayed one of several characters being blackmailed because of their (then illegal) homosexuality. In the horror spoof What a Carve Up! (1961) he starred alongside Kenneth Connor, Sid James, Shirley Eaton and Donald Pleasence, while in the science fiction film The Earth Dies Screaming (1964) he appeared alongside Willard Parker and Thorley Walters.

In the BBC television series The World of Wooster (1965–67), Price's performance as Jeeves was described by The Times as "an outstanding success", and P. G. Wodehouse said Price had "that essential touch of Jeeves mystery". Working with Ian Carmichael as Bertie Wooster, this now almost completely lost series was based on the novels and short stories of P. G. Wodehouse. He also appeared in an episode of The Avengers.

=== Later years ===
In 1967, Price was declared bankrupt; he attributed his financial distress to "extravagant living and most inadequate gambling". He then moved to the tax haven island of Sark, which coincided with an escalation in his alcoholism. Towards the end of his life, Price appeared in a series of horror movies including The Haunted House of Horror (1969), Twins of Evil (1971), Horror Hospital (1973) and Theatre of Blood (1973), as well as five films directed by Jesús Franco. One of his last film appearances was a star-studded version of Alice in Wonderland (1972) with Ralph Richardson, Robert Helpmann, Peter Sellers and Dudley Moore, among others. On television, he had recurring roles in the ITC series Jason King (1971) and The Adventurer (1972).

Price died of heart failure, complicated by a hip fracture, in Guernsey in 1973, at the age of 58. He was cremated at the Foulon Vale Crematorium, Guernsey, and his ashes were buried outside St. Peter's Anglican Church on Sark, next to the traditional burial plot of the Seigneurs of Sark.

In the book British Film Character Actors (1982), Terence Pettigrew wrote that Price's most successful screen characterisations were "refined, self-centred, caddish and contemptuous of a world inhabited by inferiors. Everything about him was deceptive. He could be penniless and still manage to look as if he owned the bank. But behind all that grand talk and lordly ways, there skulked, in his characters, the most ordinary of shabby, grasping souls."

== Personal life ==
Price was married to the actress Joan Schofield from 1939 to 1950. They had two daughters. Decades after his death, it was claimed that Price was bisexual.

In April 1954, he tried to commit suicide by gas in a London guest house. Public sympathy led to a revival of his career and the offer of film roles.
