= Aubrey Baring =

British film producer (1912–1985)

Aubrey Baring (1912–1985) was a British film producer. For a number of years he was in partnership with Maxwell Setton. They made movies for a newly organised Mayflower Productions, releasing through Rank.

== Select filmography ==
- Snowbound (1948)
- The Bad Lord Byron (1949)
- Fools Rush In (1949)
- The Spider and the Fly (1949)
- Cairo Road (1950)
- The Adventurers (1951)
- So Little Time (1952)
- Appointment in London (1953)
- South of Algiers (1953)
- They Who Dare (1954)
- Charley Moon (1956)
- The Abominable Snowman (1957)
- The Key (1958) (associate producer)
- Cone of Silence (1960)
- The Wrong Arm of the Law (1963)
