= Robert Westerby =

British screenwriter (1909–1968)

Robert Westerby (3 July 1909 in Hackney, England – 16 November 1968 in Los Angeles County, California, United States), was a writer of novels (published by Arthur Barker of London) and screenwriter for films and television. An amateur boxer in his youth, he wrote many early magazine articles and stories centred around that sport. As a writer of screenplays, he was employed at Disney's Burbank studio from 1961 until his death in 1968.

Westerby's 1937 novel Wide Boys Never Work, a story of the criminal underworld before the Second World War, was an early published use of the term "wide boy". In 1956 the book was made into the British film Soho Incident (released in the United States as Spin a Dark Web). In 2008 London Books republished Wide Boys Never Work as part of their London Books classics series.

His account of his early life was entitled A Magnum for my Mother (1946); in British English, a "magnum" meant a large bottle of champagne, however in the USA it could suggest a type of handgun, so it was retitled Champagne for Mother (1947).

== Bibliography ==
- Wide Boys Never Work (1937)
- Only Pain is Real (1937)
- In These Quiet Streets (1938)
- French for Funny, and Other Stories (1938)
- Polish Gold (1940)
- The Small Voice (1940)
- Tomorrow Started Yesterday (1940)
- Hunger Allows No Choice (1941)
- Mad in Pursuit (1945)
- A Magnum for my Mother (1946)
- Champagne for Mother (1947)
- An Awful Lot of Coffee (1950)
- Five-Day Crossing (1952)
- In the Money (1952)

== Partial filmography ==
- Night Beat (1947)
- The White Unicorn (1947)
- Woman Hater (1948)
- Don't Ever Leave Me (1949)
- The Spider and the Fly (1949)
- Prelude to Fame (1950)
- Cairo Road (1950)
- The Adventurers (1951)
- Appointment in London (1953)
- South of Algiers (1953)
- The Square Ring (1953)
- They Who Dare (1954)
- Malaga (1954)
- Before I Wake (1955)
- War and Peace (1956)
- The Surgeon's Knife (1957)
- Sea of Sand (1958)
- Cone of Silence (1960)
- Greyfriars Bobby: The True Story of a Dog (1961)
- The Devil's Agent (1962)
- The Mystery of the Indian Temple (1963)
- Kali Yug: Goddess of Vengeance (1963)
- The Three Lives of Thomasina (1963)
- The Scarecrow of Romney Marsh (1963)
- The Fighting Prince of Donegal (1966)

== Television ==
- Disneyland
- The Alfred Hitchcock Hour
- Sword of Freedom
- The Invisible Man
