= List of British comedy films =

== Notable films ==
This is a list of notable British comedy films from the 1930s, the 1940s, the 1950s, the 1960s, the 1970s, the 1980s, the 1990s, the 2000s and the 2010s.

=== 1930s ===
- Boots! Boots! (1934)
- A Cup of Kindness (1934)
- Easy Money (1934)
- Radio Parade of 1935 (1934)
- Those Were the Days (1934)
- Trouble in Store (1934)
- Virginia's Husband (1934)
- What Happened to Harkness? (1934)
- Boys Will Be Boys (1935)
- Dandy Dick (1935)
- The Ghost Goes West (1935)
- No Limit (1935)
- Off the Dole (1935)
- Say It with Diamonds (1935)
- So You Won't Talk (1935)
- The Stoker (1935)
- Stormy Weather (1935)
- Captain Bill (1936)
- Cheer Up (1936)
- Educated Evans (1936)
- Excuse My Glove (1936)
- In the Soup (1936)
- The Interrupted Honeymoon (1936)
- It's Love Again (1936)
- Jack of All Trades (1936)
- Keep Your Seats, Please (1936)
- King of the Castle (1936)
- Laburnum Grove (1936)
- Love at Sea (1936)
- Love in Exile (1936)
- The Man in the Mirror (1936)
- Not So Dusty (1936)
- Pot Luck (1936)
- Public Nuisance No. 1 (1936)
- Queen of Hearts (1936)
- Radio Lover (1936)
- Southern Roses (1936)
- To Catch a Thief (1936)
- Where There's a Will (1936)
- Windbag the Sailor (1936)
- Aren't Men Beasts! (1937)
- Boys Will Be Girls (1937)
- Cotton Queen (1937)
- The Dominant Sex (1937)
- Feather Your Nest (1937)
- Good Morning, Boys (1937)
- Intimate Relations (1937)
- It's Not Cricket (1937)
- Kathleen Mavourneen (1937)
- Keep Fit (1937)
- Knights for a Day (1937)
- Let's Make a Night of It (1937)
- The Man Who Could Work Miracles (1937)
- O-Kay for Sound (1937)
- Oh, Mr Porter! (1937)
- Old Mother Riley (1937)
- Over She Goes (1937)
- Please Teacher (1937)
- Racing Romance (1937)
- The Show Goes On (1937)
- Smash and Grab (1937)
- Spring Handicap (1937)
- Storm in a Teacup (1937)
- Take a Chance (1937)
- Take My Tip (1937)
- You Live and Learn (1937)
- A Sister to Assist 'Er (1938)
- A Spot of Bother (1938)
- Alf's Button Afloat (1938)
- Break the News (1938)
- Climbing High (1938)
- Convict 99 (1938)
- The Divorce of Lady X (1938)
- Everything Happens to Me (1938)
- Glamour Girl (1938)
- Hey! Hey! USA (1938)
- Hold My Hand (1938)
- I See Ice (1938)
- It's in the Air (1938)
- Night Alone (1938)
- Oh Boy! (1938)
- Old Bones of the River (1938)
- Old Mother Riley in Paris (1938)
- Owd Bob (1938)
- Penny Paradise (1938)
- Pygmalion (1938)
- Sailing Along (1938)
- Save a Little Sunshine (1938)
- The Sky's the Limit (1938)
- St. Martin's Lane (1938)
- Thank Evans (1938)
- Yes, Madam? (1938)
- Ask a Policeman (1939)
- Cheer Boys Cheer (1939)
- Come On George! (1939)
- The Frozen Limits (1939)
- The Gang's All Here (1939)
- Home from Home (1939)
- Let's Be Famous (1939)
- The Mikado (1939)
- The Mysterious Mr. Davis (1939)
- Old Mother Riley, MP (1939)
- So This Is London (1939)
- Trouble Brewing (1939)
- Young Man's Fancy (1939)

=== 1940s ===
- Band Waggon (1940)
- Charley's (Big-Hearted) Aunt (1940)
- Crook's Tour (1940)
- Hoots Mon! (1940)
- Jailbirds (1940)
- Law and Disorder (1940)
- Let George Do It! (1940)
- The Middle Watch (1940)
- Night Train to Munich (1940)
- Old Mother Riley in Business (1940)
- Old Mother Riley in Society (1940)
- Old Mother Riley Joins Up (1940)
- Sailors Don't Care (1940)
- Sailors Three (1940)
- Somewhere in England (1940)
- Spare a Copper (1940)
- Under Your Hat (1940)
- Where's That Fire? (1940)
- Gasbags (1941)
- The Ghost of St. Michael's (1941)
- The Ghost Train (1941)
- Hi Gang! (1941)
- I Thank You (1941)
- Kipps (1941)
- Major Barbara (1941)
- Old Bill and Son (1941)
- Old Mother Riley's Circus (1941)
- Old Mother Riley's Ghosts (1941)
- Quiet Wedding (1941)
- South American George (1941)
- Spring Meeting (1941)
- Turned Out Nice Again (1941)
- Back-Room Boy (1942)
- The Balloon Goes Up (1942)
- Banana Ridge (1942)
- The Big Blockade (1942)
- The Black Sheep of Whitehall (1942)
- Go to Blazes (1942)
- The Goose Steps Out (1942)
- King Arthur Was a Gentleman (1942)
- Much Too Shy (1942)
- Somewhere in Camp (1942)
- The Butler's Dilemma (1943)
- The Demi-Paradise (1943)
- Get Cracking (1943)
- It's That Man Again (1943)
- Miss London Ltd. (1943)
- My Learned Friend (1943)
- Old Mother Riley Detective (1943)
- Old Mother Riley Overseas (1943)
- Somewhere in Civvies (1943)
- Somewhere on Leave (1943)
- Up with the Lark (1943)
- Women Aren't Angels (1943)
- A Canterbury Tale (1944)
- Bees in Paradise (1944)
- Bell-Bottom George (1944)
- Champagne Charlie (1944)
- Demobbed (1944)
- Dreaming (1944)
- Fiddlers Three (1944)
- He Snoops to Conquer (1944)
- It's in the Bag (1944)
- On Approval (1944)
- One Exciting Night (1944)
- Tawny Pipit (1944)
- This Happy Breed (1944)
- Two Thousand Women (1944)
- Blithe Spirit (1945)
- Caesar and Cleopatra (1945)
- Home Sweet Home (1945)
- I Didn't Do It (1945)
- I Know Where I'm Going! (1945)
- Old Mother Riley at Home (1945)
- 29 Acacia Avenue (1945)
- George in Civvy Street (1946)
- Here Comes the Sun (1946)
- London Town (1946)
- Quiet Weekend (1946)
- School for Secrets (1946)
- An Ideal Husband (1947)
- The Ghosts of Berkeley Square (1947)
- Holiday Camp (1947)
- Hue and Cry (1947)
- Just William's Luck (1947)
- A Piece of Cake (1948)
- Brass Monkey (1948)
- Easy Money (1948)
- Here Come the Huggetts (1948)
- Holidays with Pay (1948)
- It's Hard to Be Good (1948)
- Miranda (1948)
- Somewhere in Politics (1948)
- Spring in Park Lane (1948)
- Things Happen at Night (1948)
- Vice Versa (1948)
- When You Come Home (1948)
- Woman Hater (1948)
- A Run for Your Money (1949)
- Adam and Evelyne (1949)
- The Adventures of Jane (1949)
- All Over the Town (1949)
- The Chiltern Hundreds (1949)
- Dear Mr. Prohack (1949)
- Don't Ever Leave Me (1949)
- Fools Rush In (1949)
- Helter Skelter (1949)
- The History of Mr. Polly (1949)
- The Huggetts Abroad (1949)
- It's Not Cricket (1949)
- Kind Hearts and Coronets (1949)
- Marry Me! (1949)
- Melody (1949)
- Old Mother Riley's New Venture (1949)
- Passport to Pimlico (1949)
- The Perfect Woman (1949)
- Poet's Pub (1949)
- The Romantic Age (1949)
- Saints and Sinners (1949)
- School for Randle (1949)
- Traveller's Joy (1949)
- Trottie True (1949)
- Vote for Huggett (1949)
- Warning to Wantons (1949)
- Whisky Galore! (1949)

=== 1950s ===
- The Girl Who Couldn't Quite (1950)
- The Happiest Days of Your Life (1950)
- Her Favourite Husband (1950)
- Into the Blue (1950)
- Last Holiday (1950)
- The Magnet (1950)
- Old Mother Riley Headmistress (1950)
- Over the Garden Wall (1950)
- Something in the City (1950)
- Appointment with Venus (1951)
- Encore (1951)
- The Galloping Major (1951)
- Happy Go Lovely (1951)
- Hotel Sahara (1951)
- Lady Godiva Rides Again (1951)
- Laughter in Paradise (1951)
- The Lavender Hill Mob (1951)
- Let's Go Crazy (1951)
- Madame Louise (1951)
- The Man in the White Suit (1951)
- Old Mother Riley's Jungle Treasure (1951)
- One Wild Oat (1951)
- Penny Points to Paradise (1951)
- Talk of a Million (1951)
- Young Wives' Tale (1951)
- Brandy for the Parson (1952)
- The Card (1952)
- Castle in the Air (1952)
- Curtain Up (1952)
- Down Among the Z Men (1952)
- Father's Doing Fine (1952)
- Folly to Be Wise (1952)
- The Happy Family (1952)
- His Excellency (1952)
- The Importance of Being Earnest (1952)
- Little Big Shot (1952)
- Made in Heaven (1952)
- Miss Robin Hood (1952)
- Mother Riley Meets the Vampire (1952)
- My Wife's Lodger (1952)
- Penny Princess (1952)
- The Pickwick Papers (1952)
- Song of Paris (1952)
- Time Gentlemen, Please! (1952)
- Treasure Hunt (1952)
- Who Goes There! (1952)
- You're Only Young Twice (1952)
- A Day to Remember (1953)
- Always a Bride (1953)
- The Captain's Paradise (1953)
- The Final Test (1953)
- Forces' Sweetheart (1953)
- Genevieve (1953)
- The Great Game (1953)
- Innocents in Paris (1953)
- Is Your Honeymoon Really Necessary? (1953)
- Isn't Life Wonderful! (1953)
- It's a Grand Life (1953)
- Laxdale Hall (1953)
- Love in Pawn (1953)
- The Oracle (1953)
- Our Girl Friday (1953)
- Those People Next Door (1953)
- The Titfield Thunderbolt (1953)
- Top of the Form (1953)
- Trouble in Store (1953)
- Valley of Song (1953)
- Will Any Gentleman...? (1953)
- The Angel Who Pawned Her Harp (1954)
- Aunt Clara (1954)
- The Beachcomber (1954)
- The Belles of St. Trinian's (1954)
- Calling All Cars (1954)
- Conflict of Wings (1954)
- The Crowded Day (1954)
- Doctor in the House (1954)
- Fast and Loose (1954)
- Father Brown (1954)
- For Better, for Worse (1954)
- The Gay Dog (1954)
- Happy Ever After (1954)
- Hobson's Choice (1954)
- Life with the Lyons (1954)
- Lilacs in the Spring (1954)
- The Love Lottery (1954)
- Mad About Men (1954)
- Make Me an Offer (1954)
- The Maggie (1954)
- The Million Pound Note (1954)
- The Runaway Bus (1954)
- To Dorothy a Son (1954)
- Trouble in the Glen (1954)
- Up to His Neck (1954)
- You Know What Sailors Are (1954)
- A Yank in Ermine (1955)
- All for Mary (1955)
- An Alligator Named Daisy (1955)
- The Constant Husband (1955)
- Doctor at Sea (1955)
- Fun at St. Fanny's (1955)
- Geordie (1955)
- I Am a Camera (1955)
- It's a Great Day (1955)
- John and Julie (1955)
- Josephine and Men (1955)
- The Ladykillers (1955)
- The Love Match (1955)
- The Lyons in Paris (1955)
- Man of the Moment (1955)
- The Man Who Loved Redheads (1955)
- Miss Tulip Stays the Night (1955)
- No Smoking (1955)
- One Good Turn (1955)
- Orders Are Orders (1955)
- Simon and Laura (1955)
- The Time of His Life (1955)
- To Paris with Love (1955)
- Touch and Go (1955)
- Value for Money (1955)
- Where There's a Will (1955)
- You Lucky People! (1955)
- A Touch of the Sun (1956)
- The Baby and the Battleship (1956)
- The Case of the Mukkinese Battle-Horn (1956)
- Dry Rot (1956)
- The Extra Day (1956)
- The Green Man (1956)
- The Iron Petticoat (1956)
- It's a Wonderful World (1956)
- It's Great to Be Young (1956)
- It's Never Too Late (1956)
- Jumping for Joy (1956)
- Keep It Clean (1956)
- Loser Takes All (1956)
- The March Hare (1956)
- Not So Dusty (1956)
- Private's Progress (1956)
- Ramsbottom Rides Again (1956)
- Sailor Beware! (1956)
- Smiley (1956)
- Three Men in a Boat (1956)
- Tons of Trouble (1956)
- Up in the World (1956)
- Who Done It? (1956)
- The Admirable Crichton (1957)
- Barnacle Bill (1957)
- Blue Murder at St Trinian's (1957)
- Brothers in Law (1957)
- Carry On Admiral (1957) (not part of the Carry On series)
- Doctor at Large (1957)
- The Good Companions (1957)
- Just My Luck (1957)
- Let's Be Happy (1957)
- Lucky Jim (1957)
- The Naked Truth (1957)
- Not Wanted on Voyage (1957)
- Small Hotel (1957)
- The Smallest Show on Earth (1957)
- True as a Turtle (1957)
- Bachelor of Hearts (1958)
- The Big Money (1958)
- Carry On Sergeant (1958)
- The Duke Wore Jeans (1958)
- Further Up the Creek (1958)
- Girls at Sea (1958)
- Happy Is the Bride (1958)
- The Horse's Mouth (1958)
- I Only Arsked! (1958)
- Indiscreet (1958)
- The Lady Is a Square (1958)
- Law and Disorder (1958)
- Next to No Time (1958)
- Rockets Galore! (1958)
- Rooney (1958)
- The Square Peg (1958)
- Up the Creek (1958)
- Wonderful Things! (1958)
- Alive and Kicking (1959)
- Battle of the Sexes (1959)
- The Bridal Path (1959)
- The Captain's Table (1959)
- Carlton-Browne of the F.O. (1959)
- Carry On Nurse (1959)
- Carry On Teacher (1959)
- Desert Mice (1959)
- Don't Panic Chaps! (1959)
- Follow a Star (1959)
- I'm All Right Jack (1959)
- Idol on Parade (1959)
- Left Right and Centre (1959)
- Make Mine a Million (1959)
- The Mouse That Roared (1959)
- The Navy Lark (1959)
- The Night We Dropped a Clanger (1959)
- Operation Bullshine (1959)
- Our Man in Havana (1959)
- Please Turn Over (1959)
- Strictly Confidential (1959)
- Too Many Crooks (1959)

=== 1960s ===
- A French Mistress (1960)
- And the Same to You (1960)
- Bottoms Up (1960)
- The Boy Who Stole a Million (1960)
- The Bulldog Breed (1960)
- Carry On Constable (1960)
- Dentist in the Chair (1960)
- Doctor in Love (1960)
- Follow That Horse! (1960)
- The Grass Is Greener (1960)
- Inn for Trouble (1960)
- The League of Gentlemen (1960)
- Let's Get Married (1960)
- Life Is a Circus (1960)
- Light Up the Sky! (1960)
- Make Mine Mink (1960)
- Man in the Moon (1960)
- The Millionairess (1960)
- No Kidding (1960)
- Operation Cupid (1960)
- The Pure Hell of St Trinian's (1960)
- Sands of the Desert (1960)
- School for Scoundrels (1960)
- There Was a Crooked Man (1960)
- Two-Way Stretch (1960)
- Watch Your Stern (1960)
- Your Money or Your Wife (1960)
- A Matter of WHO (1961)
- A Weekend with Lulu (1961)
- Carry On Regardless (1961)
- Dentist on the Job (1961)
- Don't Bother to Knock (1961)
- Double Bunk (1961)
- The Girl on the Boat (1961)
- His and Hers (1961)
- Invasion Quartet (1961)
- Nearly a Nasty Accident (1961)
- The Night We Got the Bird (1961)
- Nothing Barred (1961)
- No My Darling Daughter (1961)
- On the Fiddle (1961)
- Part-Time Wife (1961)
- Petticoat Pirates (1961)
- Raising the Wind (1961)
- The Rebel (1961)
- Very Important Person (1961)
- Watch It, Sailor! (1961)
- What a Carve Up! (1961)
- What a Whopper (1961)
- A Pair of Briefs (1962)
- The Amorous Prawn (1962)
- Carry On Cruising (1962)
- Crooks Anonymous (1962)
- The Dock Brief (1962)
- Go to Blazes (1962)
- The Golden Rabbit (1962)
- In the Doghouse (1962)
- The Iron Maiden (1962)
- Mrs Gibbons' Boys (1962)
- On the Beat (1962)
- Only Two Can Play (1962)
- Operation Snatch (1962)
- The Punch and Judy Man (1962)
- She'll Have to Go (1962)
- Twice Round the Daffodils (1962)
- We Joined the Navy (1962)
- A Stitch in Time (1963)
- Billy Liar (1963)
- Carry On Cabby (1963)
- The Cracksman (1963)
- Doctor in Distress (1963)
- The Fast Lady (1963)
- Father Came Too! (1963)
- Heavens Above! (1963)
- Ladies Who Do (1963)
- The Mouse on the Moon (1963)
- Nurse on Wheels (1963)
- Strictly for the Birds (1963)
- Tom Jones (1963)
- Two Left Feet (1963)
- The Wrong Arm of the Law (1963)
- A Hard Day's Night (1964)
- A Home of Your Own (1964)
- The Bargee (1964)
- Carry On Cleo (1964)
- Carry On Jack (1964)
- Carry On Spying (1964)
- Crooks in Cloisters (1964)
- Dr. Strangelove (1964)
- French Dressing (1964)
- Hot Enough for June (1964)
- Never Put It in Writing (1964)
- Nothing but the Best (1964)
- One Way Pendulum (1964)
- Rattle of a Simple Man (1964)
- The Amorous Adventures of Moll Flanders (1965)
- The Big Job (1965)
- Carry On Cowboy (1965)
- The Early Bird (1965)
- Every Day's a Holiday (1965)
- Gonks Go Beat (1965)
- Help! (1965)
- The Intelligence Men (1965)
- Joey Boy (1965)
- The Knack ...and How to Get It (1965)
- Rotten to the Core (1965)
- Those Magnificent Men in Their Flying Machines (1965)
- You Must Be Joking! (1965)
- Alfie (1966)
- Carry On Screaming! (1966)
- Doctor in Clover (1966)
- Don't Lose Your Head (1966)
- The Great St. Trinian's Train Robbery (1966)
- Morgan! (1966)
- Press for Time (1966)
- The Sandwich Man (1966)
- The Spy with a Cold Nose (1966)
- That Riviera Touch (1966)
- Where the Bullets Fly (1966)
- The Wrong Box (1966)
- A Countess from Hong Kong (1967)
- Bedazzled (1967)
- Carry On Doctor (1967)
- Casino Royale (1967)
- Follow That Camel (1967)
- How I Won the War (1967)
- I'll Never Forget What's'isname (1967)
- The Jokers (1967)
- Jules Verne's Rocket to the Moon (1967)
- Just like a Woman (1967)
- The Magnificent Two (1967)
- The Plank (1967)
- Smashing Time (1967)
- Carry On Up the Khyber (1968)
- Here We Go Round the Mulberry Bush (1968)
- Only When I Larf (1968)
- Prudence and the Pill (1968)
- Till Death Us Do Part (1968)
- The Assassination Bureau (1969)
- The Bed Sitting Room (1969)
- The Best House in London (1969)
- Carry On Again Doctor (1969)
- Carry On Camping (1969)
- Crooks and Coronets (1969)
- The Italian Job (1969)
- The Magic Christian (1969)
- Otley (1969)
- What's Good for the Goose (1969)
- Lock Up Your Daughters! (1969)

=== 1970s ===
- All the Way Up (1970)
- The Breaking of Bumbo (1970)
- Carry On Loving (1970)
- Carry On Up the Jungle (1970)
- Cool It Carol! (1970)
- Doctor in Trouble (1970)
- Entertaining Mr Sloane (1970)
- Every Home Should Have One (1970)
- Hoffman (1970)
- Loot (1970)
- Perfect Friday (1970)
- The Rise and Rise of Michael Rimmer (1970)
- Simon, Simon (1970)
- Some Will, Some Won't (1970)
- Take a Girl Like You (1970)
- There's a Girl in My Soup (1970)
- And Now for Something Completely Different (1971)
- Carry On at Your Convenience (1971)
- Carry On Henry (1971)
- Dad's Army (1971)
- Games That Lovers Play (1971)
- Gumshoe (1971)
- Melody (1971)
- On the Buses (1971)
- Percy (1971)
- Please Sir! (1971)
- The Statue (1971)
- Suburban Wives (1971)
- Up the Chastity Belt (1971)
- Up Pompeii (1971)
- A Day in the Death of Joe Egg (1972)
- The Alf Garnett Saga (1972)
- Au Pair Girls (1972)
- Bless This House (1972)
- Carry On Abroad (1972)
- Carry On Matron (1972)
- Commuter Husbands (1972)
- For the Love of Ada (1972)
- Go for a Take (1972)
- Mutiny on the Buses (1972)
- Nearest and Dearest (1972)
- Ooh... You Are Awful (1972)
- Our Miss Fred (1972)
- Pulp (1972)
- Rentadick (1972)
- Sex and the Other Woman (1972)
- Steptoe and Son (1972)
- Sunstruck (1972)
- That's Your Funeral (1972)
- Up the Front (1972)
- Adolf Hitler: My Part in His Downfall (1973)
- The Best Pair of Legs in the Business (1973)
- Carry On Girls (1973)
- Don't Just Lie There, Say Something! (1973)
- Father, Dear Father (1973)
- Holiday on the Buses (1973)
- The House in Nightmare Park (1973)
- Love Thy Neighbour (1973)
- The Lovers! (1973)
- The National Health (1973)
- Never Mind the Quality Feel the Width (1973)
- No Sex Please, We're British (1973)
- Not Now, Darling (1973)
- Secrets of a Door-to-Door Salesman (1973)
- The Sex Thief (1973)
- Steptoe and Son Ride Again (1973)
- Tiffany Jones (1973)
- White Cargo (1973)
- The Best of Benny Hill (1974)
- Can You Keep It Up for a Week? (1974)
- Carry On Dick (1974)
- Confessions of a Window Cleaner (1974)
- The Great McGonagall (1974)
- Man About the House (1974)
- Percy's Progress (1974)
- Romance with a Double Bass (1974)
- Soft Beds, Hard Battles (1974)
- Vampira (1974)
- The Amorous Milkman (1975)
- Carry On Behind (1975)
- Confessions of a Pop Performer (1975)
- Eskimo Nell (1975)
- Monty Python and the Holy Grail (1975)
- One of Our Dinosaurs Is Missing (1975)
- The Return of the Pink Panther (1975)
- Adventures of a Taxi Driver (1976)
- Confessions of a Driving Instructor (1976)
- Keep It Up Downstairs (1976)
- The Likely Lads (1976)
- The Pink Panther Strikes Again (1976)
- Adventures of a Private Eye (1977)
- Are You Being Served? (1977)
- Confessions from a Holiday Camp (1977)
- Jabberwocky (1977)
- Carry On Emmannuelle (1978)
- Adventures of a Plumber's Mate (1978)
- Monty Python's Life of Brian (1979)
- Porridge (1979)

=== 1980s ===
- George and Mildred (1980)
- Rising Damp (1980)
- An American Werewolf in London (1981)
- Gregory's Girl (1981)
- Time Bandits (1981)
- The Boys in Blue (1982)
- Privates on Parade (1982)
- Victor/Victoria (1982)
- Bullshot (1983)
- Educating Rita (1983)
- Local Hero (1983)
- Loose Connections (1983)
- The Missionary (1983)
- Monty Python's The Meaning of Life (1983)
- Comfort and Joy (1984)
- A Private Function (1984)
- Brazil (1985)
- Morons from Outer Space (1985)
- Restless Natives (1985)
- Turtle Diary (1985)
- Water (1985)
- Clockwise
- Car Trouble (1986)
- Personal Services (1987)
- Rita, Sue and Bob Too (1987)
- Wish You Were Here (1987)
- Withnail and I (1987)
- Consuming Passions (1988)
- A Fish Called Wanda (1988)
- High Hopes (1988)
- Jane and the Lost City (1988)
- Without a Clue (1988)
- Erik the Viking (1989)
- Shirley Valentine (1989)
- The Tall Guy (1989)
- Wilt (1989)

=== 1990s ===
- Nuns on the Run (1990)
- The Commitments (1991)
- Life Is Sweet (1991)
- The Pope Must Die (1991)
- Rosencrantz & Guildenstern (1991)
- Truly, Madly, Deeply (1991)
- Carry On Columbus (1992)
- Hear My Song (1992)
- Just like a Woman (1992)
- Peter's Friends (1992)
- Rebecca's Daughters (1992)
- Hour of the Pig (1993)
- The Big Freeze (1993)
- Leon the Pig Farmer (1993)
- Much Ado About Nothing (1993)
- Splitting Heirs (1993)
- Four Weddings and a Funeral (1994)
- Princess Caraboo (1994)
- Widows' Peak (1994)
- The Englishman Who Went Up a Hill But Came Down a Mountain (1995)
- Funny Bones (1995)
- Jack and Sarah (1995)
- The Madness of King George (1995)
- A Month by the Lake (1995)
- Brassed Off (1996)
- Trainspotting (1996)
- Bean (1997)
- Bring Me the Head of Mavis Davis (1997)
- The Full Monty (1997)
- Keep the Aspidistra Flying (1997)
- A Life Less Ordinary (1997)
- Shooting Fish (1997)
- Twin Town (1997)
- Little Voice (1998)
- Lock, Stock and Two Smoking Barrels (1998)
- Shakespeare in Love (1998)
- Sliding Doors (1998)
- Still Crazy (1998)
- Beautiful People (1999)
- East is East (1999)
- Gregory's Two Girls (1999)
- Guest House Paradiso (1999)
- An Ideal Husband (1999)
- Waking Ned Devine (1998)
- Notting Hill (1999)
- Plunkett and MacLeane (1999)

=== 2000s ===
- Billy Elliot (2000)
- Chicken Run (2000)
- Greenfingers (2000)
- Kevin & Perry Go Large (2000)
- Relative Values (2000)
- Saving Grace (2000)
- Snatch (2000)
- Birthday Girl (2001)
- Bridget Jones's Diary (2001)
- Lucky Break (2001)
- The Martins (2001)
- The Parole Officer (2001)
- About a Boy (2002)
- Ali G Indahouse (2002)
- Bend It Like Beckham (2002)
- The Actors (2003)
- Blackball (2003)
- Calendar Girls (2003)
- Hello Friend (2003)
- Johnny English (2003)
- Love Actually (2003)
- S Club: Seeing Double (2003)
- Around the World in 80 Days (2004)
- Bridget Jones: The Edge of Reason (2004)
- Churchill: The Hollywood Years (2004)
- It's All Gone Pete Tong (2004)
- Sex Lives of the Potato Men (2004)
- Shaun of the Dead (2004)
- Stella Street: The Movie (2004)
- Wimbledon (2004)
- Keeping Mum (2005)
- Kinky Boots (2005)
- The Hitchhiker's Guide to the Galaxy (2005)
- The League of Gentlemen's Apocalypse (2005)
- The Magic Roundabout (2005)
- Mrs Henderson Presents (2005)
- The Truth About Love (2005)
- Valiant (2005)
- Wallace & Gromit: The Curse of the Were-Rabbit (2005)
- A Cock and Bull Story (2006)
- Confetti (2006)
- Driving Lessons (2006)
- Love and Other Disasters (2006)
- Six Bend Trap (2006)
- Starter for 10 (2006)
- Death at a Funeral (2007)
- Fishtales (2007)
- Grow Your Own (2007)
- Hot Fuzz (2007)
- I Want Candy (2007)
- Magicians (2007)
- Mr. Bean's Holiday (2007)
- Run Fatboy Run (2007)
- Son of Rambow (2007)
- St Trinian's (2007)
- Happy-Go-Lucky (2008)
- How to Lose Friends & Alienate People (2008)
- RocknRolla (2008)
- Three and Out (2008)
- The Boat That Rocked (2009)
- Bunny And The Bull (2009)
- Frequently Asked Questions About Time Travel (2009)
- In the Loop (2009)
- Lesbian Vampire Killers (2009)
- St. Trinian's 2: The Legend of Fritton's Gold (2009)

=== 2010s ===
- My Last Five Girlfriends (2010)
- Kick-Ass (2010)
- Cemetery Junction (2010)
- Four Lions (2010)
- Wild Target (2010)
- Scott Pilgrim vs. the World (2010)
- Tamara Drewe (2010)
- Burke & Hare (2010)
- Another Year (2010)
- Paul (2011)
- Submarine (2011)
- Anuvahood (2011)
- Attack the Block (2011)
- Horrid Henry: The Movie (2011)
- The Inbetweeners Movie (2011)
- Johnny English Reborn (2011)
- Sightseers (2012)
- I Give It a Year (2013)
- The World's End (2013)
- Alan Partridge: Alpha Papa (2013)
- Kick-Ass 2 (2013)
- About Time (2013)
- What We Did on Our Holiday (2014)
- Kingsman: The Secret Service (2015)
- Shaun the Sheep Movie (2015)
- Bill (2015)
- Dad's Army (2016)
- Bridget Jones's Baby (2016)
- Grimsby (2016)
- Kingsman: The Golden Circle (2017)
- Early Man (2018)
- Johnny English Strikes Again (2018)
- Blinded by the Light (2019)
- Fighting with My Family (2019)
- Fisherman's Friends (2019)
- Yesterday (2019)
- Horrible Histories: The Movie – Rotten Romans (2019)
- Days of the Bagnold Summer (2019)
- The Personal History of David Copperfield (2019)
- Military Wives (2019)
- How to Build a Girl (2019)
- A Shaun the Sheep Movie: Farmageddon (2019)
- Eternal Beauty (2019)
- Last Christmas (2019)
- The Gentlemen (2019)

== See also ==
- Film genre
- List of American comedy films
- List of British comedians
- List of films based on British sitcoms
