= Elliott Mason =

British actress (1888–1949)

Elliott Cranston Mason
- in The Gentle Sex (1943)
- Born: 29 January 1888; Glasgow, Scotland
- Died: 20 June 1949 (aged 60–61); Lingfield, England
- Other names: Eliot Mason; Elliot Mason
- Occupation: Actress
- Years active: 1935–1946 (film)

Elliott Mason (29 January 1888 – 20 June 1949) was a British stage and film actress. She was sometimes credited as Elliot Mason.

After making her screen debut in the 1935 comedy The Ghost Goes West, Mason appeared regularly in supporting roles for the next decade. She worked on several films made at Ealing Studios including The Ghost of St. Michael's, where her seemingly respectable character turns out to be a German spy, and Turned Out Nice Again in which she plays a domineering mother-in-law. Her final appearance was in the 1946 prisoner-of-war drama The Captive Heart.

== Filmography ==
Year	Title	Role	Notes
1935	The Ghost Goes West	Mrs. MacNiff	
1936	Gaol Break	Euphie	
1936	Born That Way	Aunt Emily	
1938	Owd Bob	Mrs. Winthrop	
1938	I See Ice	Mother on Train	Uncredited
1938	Break the News	Dresser	
1938	The Citadel	District Nurse	Uncredited
1938	Marigold	Beenie	
1938	The Ware Case	Jury Woman	
1939	Black Limelight	Jemima	
1939	Blind Folly	Aunt Mona	
1940	21 Days	Frau Grunlich	
1940	Return to Yesterday	Mrs. Priskin	
1940	Charley's (Big-Hearted) Aunt	Dame Luckton	
1941	The Ghost of St. Michael's	Mrs. Wigmore	
1941	Turned Out Nice Again	Mrs. Pearson	
1942	The Big Blockade	German: German Stationmistress	
1943	The Gentle Sex	Mrs. Fraser	
1944	On Approval	Mrs. McCosh - the Housekeeper	
1945	The Agitator	Mrs. Pettinger	
1945	Perfect Strangers	Mrs. Hemmings	
1946	The Captive Heart	Mrs. Lennox	

== Bibliography ==
- Barr, Charles. Ealing Studios. University of California Press, 1998.
