= Bailiff (disambiguation) =

Bailiff usually refers to law enforcement officers involved with lower courts of the UK or providing courtroom security and order in the US.

Bailiff may also refer to:

- Bailiff (France) (French: bailli), a medieval governor in areas of northern France
- Bailiff (chivalric orders) (French: bailli), a knight Hospitaller who directed one of its bailiwicks abroad or one of the national associations ("tongues") at its headquarters
- Steward (office), a general manager of medieval estates
- Landvogt, a German office
- High Bailiff of the Isle of Man
- Bailiffs of Jersey and Guernsey, the chief justice and head of the legislature of the bailiwicks of the Channel Islands
- Bailiff of Jersey
- Huissier de justice, an office in various European countries
- The Bailiffs, 1932 British comedy film with Flanagan and Allen

== See also ==
- Baillif, Guadeloupe, France
