= The Black Sheep of Whitehall =

1942 British film by Basil Dearden, Will Hay

- Original British quad format film poster by Dudley Pout
- Directed by: Basil Dearden; Will Hay
- Written by: John Dighton; Angus MacPhail
- Produced by: Michael Balcon; S.C. Balcon (associate producer)
- Starring: Will Hay; John Mills; Basil Sydney; Henry Hewitt; Felix Aylmer; Thora Hird
- Cinematography: Eric Cross; Günther Krampf
- Edited by: Ray Pitt
- Production company: Ealing Studios
- Distributed by: United Artists (UK)
- Release date: 8 January 1942 (UK)
- Running time: 80 min.
- Country: United Kingdom
- Language: English

The Black Sheep of Whitehall (the opening credits read Black Sheep of Whitehall) is a 1942 British black-and-white comedy war film, directed by Will Hay and Basil Dearden, starring Will Hay, John Mills, Basil Sydney and Thora Hird in her screen debut. It was produced by Michael Balcon and Ealing Studios.

== Plot ==
When he is forced to vacate the office of his debt-ridden correspondence college, 'Professor' Will Davis goes to the Ministry of International Commerce at Whitehall in order to confront his one-and-only student, PR man Bobby Jessop. To get Davis off his back, Jessop proposes to get him a job at Whitehall. Jessop then leaves in order to fetch a Professor Davys at the railway station. The professor is a leading economist who has returned from a long stay in South America in order to advise the British government on a trade treaty with the South American nations, which could be crucial to Britain's war effort.

The clueless Davis is mistaken for the expert and gets involved in a series of interviews, giving answers based on gambling, con jobs, double entendres or just plain ignorance. These scenes are very funny and are made more so by the reactions of an increasingly incredulous Joss Ambler as government minister 'Sir John'. Jessop later returns with 'Professor Davys' and the confusion is sorted out, though it has left the BBC interviewers in a state of mental collapse. Jessop then discovers that the man he brought with him is in fact Crabtree, a member of a group of fifth columnists working for Nazi Germany.

Jessop promises Davis a job if he will help him track down the real Professor Davys, who is being held in a safe house by Crabtree's associates. Assuming a number of disguises, Davis and Jessop set off to foil the plot before the treaty is compromised.

== Cast ==
- Will Hay as Will Davis
- John Mills as Bobby Jessop
- Basil Sydney as Costello
- Henry Hewitt as Professor Davys
- Felix Aylmer as Crabtree
- Owen Reynolds as Harman
- Frank Cellier as Dr Innsbach
- Joss Ambler as Sir John
- Frank Allenby as Onslowe
- Thora Hird as Joyce
- Margaret Halstan as Matron
- Barbara Valerie as Sister Spooner
- Leslie Mitchell as Radio interviewer
- George Woodbridge as Male Nurse
- George Merritt as Stationmaster
- Aubrey Mallalieu as Ticket Collector
- Kenneth Griffith as Butcher's Boy
- Cyril Chamberlain as BBC Producer
- Katie Johnson as Irate Train Passenger
- Ronald Shiner as Porter

== Reception ==
Having been cleared by the British censors on 27 October 1941, the film premiered at the Regal Cinema by Marble Arch in London on 8 January 1942. The reviewer for The Times wrote:

"Any story which gives Mr. Will Hay the chance to be himself is good enough, and ... 'The Black Sheep of Whitehall' manages for long stretches at a time to step out of the way of its own complicated plot and leave Mr. Hay to his own devices."

== Notes ==
Hay and Mills had worked before, most notably on Those Were the Days (1934). This was the first film of three where Basil Dearden and Will Hay shared the director credit, the other two being The Goose Steps Out (1942) and My Learned Friend (1943).

Broadcaster Leslie Mitchell is in the film driven to a nervous breakdown while interviewing Hay's character. Mitchell, best remembered for his Movietone News voiceovers, was a commentator for the BBC Television Service from its first transmissions on 2 November 1936.

The film is generally considered to be Thora Hird's screen debut, although she did make an uncredited appearance in another film (The Big Blockade), released earlier that same year, as a German barmaid.
