= Go to Blazes =

Go to Blazes may refer to:

- Go to Blazes (1942 film), a 1942 British short film featuring Will Hay
- Go to Blazes (1962 film), a 1962 British comedy film
