= Basil Dearden =

English film director (1911–1971)

- Born: Basil Clive Dear; 1 January 1911; Westcliff-on-Sea, Essex, England
- Died: 23 March 1971 (aged 60); Hillingdon, London, England
- Occupations: Film director, screenwriter, film producer
- Years active: 1938–1970
- Spouse(s): Margaret Ward (divorced); Melissa Stribling
- Children: 2, including James

Basil Dearden (born Basil Clive Dear; 1 January 1911 – 23 March 1971) was an English film director, screenwriter, and producer. He was best known for his work at Ealing Studios in the 1940s and 1950s, and later for his socially-conscious dramas. He won the BAFTA Award for Outstanding British Film for Sapphire (1959), and was thrice nominated for the Golden Lion, among other accolades.

One critic described him as "the journeyman-director of British cinema," while the Deutsches Filminstitut called him "one of the most outstanding directors of classic British cinema."

== Early life ==
Dearden was born as Basil Clive Dear at 5 Woodfield Road, Leigh-on-Sea, Essex to Charles James Dear, a steel manufacturer, and the former Florence Tripp.

He left school as a teenager to work at an insurance company in London. Developing an interest in theatre, Dearden worked for Ben Greet's repertory company, and later joined the Grand Theatre in Fulham as an assistant stage manager. He became Basil Dean's general stage manager in 1931, and changed his own name to Dearden to avoid confusion with his mentor.

== Career ==
In the mid-1930s, while still working for Dean, Dearden graduated from theatre direction to film. He wrote This Man Is News (1938), a hugely popular quota quickie and wrote and directed a film for TV Under Suspicion (1939).

He was assistant director on Penny Paradise (1938), produced by Dean and directed by Carol Reed, and two George Formby comedies directed by Anthony Kimmins: George Takes the Air (1938), produced by Dean, and Come on George! (1939).

Dearden was promoted to associate producer on two more George Formby films, which he also co-wrote: To Hell with Hitler (1940) aka Let George Do It and Spare a Copper (1940).

Dearden went over to Ealing Studios where he produced The Ghost of St. Michael's (1941) with Will Hay, then he produced Turned Out Nice Again (1941) with George Formby.

=== Ealing Studios ===
He first began working as a director at Ealing Studios, co-directing comedy films with Will Hay, starting with Black Sheep of Whitehall (1942). This was followed by The Goose Steps Out (1942) and My Learned Friend (1943), which was Hay's last movie.

Dearden's first solo director credit was The Bells Go Down (1943), a wartime movie with Tommy Trinder. It was produced by Michael Relph who would form a notable collaboration with Dearden.

Dearden also directed The Halfway House (1944), a drama set in Wales, and wrote and directed They Came to a City (1944), based on a play by J.B Priestley.

Dearden worked on the influential chiller compendium Dead of Night (1945) and directed the linking narrative and the "Hearse Driver" segment.

He also directed The Captive Heart (1946) starring Michael Redgrave, which was a big hit. The film was entered into the 1946 Cannes Film Festival. He directed Frieda (1947) with Mai Zetterling and produced by Relph, which was also popular.

Dearden directed Saraband for Dead Lovers (1948) an expensive costume picture that was not a large success. He wrote and directed a segment of Train of Events (1949).

The Blue Lamp (1950), probably the most frequently shown of Dearden's Ealing films, is a police drama which first introduced audiences to PC George Dixon, later resurrected for the long-running Dixon of Dock Green television series. It was hugely popular.

Less so were Cage of Gold (1950), a drama with Jean Simmons; Pool of London (1951), a crime film with a black lead, very rare for the time; and I Believe in You (1952), a drama which he also wrote and produced.

Dearden made The Gentle Gunman (1952), an IRA thriller with Dirk Bogarde; The Square Ring (1953), a boxing film with Jack Warner; The Rainbow Jacket (1954), a horse racing drama; and Out of the Clouds (1955), set at an airport.

He did a war film which he also wrote, The Ship That Died of Shame (1955) then a comedy with Benny Hill, Who Done It? (1956).

Dearden did some uncredited directing on The Green Man (1956) then made an Ealing style comedy for British Lion The Smallest Show on Earth (1957).

For Rank he made Violent Playground (1958) with Stanley Baker. He did some uncredited directing on one of Ealing's last films, Nowhere to Go (1958). He also produced Davy (1958), with Harry Secombe, for Ealing.

=== Social awareness films ===
Dearden and Michael Relph made a series of films on subjects generally not tackled by British cinema in this era starting with Sapphire (1959), a thriller about race relations that proved popular.

Dearden and Relph helped set up Allied Film Makers, for whom they made The League of Gentlemen (1960), a bank heist comedy that was very popular.

Dearden directed episodes of The Four Just Men on TV and produced two films directed by Michael Relph: Mad Little Island (1958) and Desert Mice (1959).

For Allied, Dearden directed Man in the Moon (1960), a science fiction comedy with Kenneth More that lost money. The Secret Partner (1961) was a thriller for MGM starring Stewart Granger.

Dearden directed Victim (1961) with Dirk Bogarde for Allied; a thriller about homosexuality, it was a huge success.

However, his next few movies were not popular: All Night Long (1961), an adaptation of Othello; Life for Ruth (1962), for Allied, which dealt with religious objections to operations; A Place to Go (1964), for Bryanston Films, a thriller not released for two years; and The Mind Benders (1963) a science fiction with Dirk Bogarde.

=== Later films ===
Dearden and Relph then made two films for release by United Artists: Woman of Straw (1964) starring Sean Connery; and Masquerade (1965) with Cliff Robertson. He was then hired to replace Lewis Gilbert as director of Khartoum (1966), with Charlton Heston and Laurence Olivier.

Two films were then made for release by Paramount: Only When I Larf (1968) and the Edwardian era black comedy The Assassination Bureau (1969), again with Michael Relph; it was the 25th film they had made together.

His last film was The Man Who Haunted Himself (1970), which he wrote and directed, starring Roger Moore, made for EMI Films. With Moore, Dearden made three episodes of the television series The Persuaders!: "Overture", "Powerswitch" and "To the Death, Baby".

== Personal life ==
Dearden married actress Melissa Stribling in 1947. He had previously been married to Margaret Ward, also an actress. He had two sons, writer-director James Dearden and film editor Torquil Dearden.

=== Death ===
Dearden died on 23 March 1971 at Hillingdon Hospital, London after being involved in a road accident on the M4 motorway near Heathrow Airport, in which he suffered multiple injuries.

An inquest heard that he had a very high amount of alcohol in his blood and that he was decapitated after his car crashed into a road sign and caught fire.

== Reputation ==
The film critic David Thomson does not hold Dearden in high regard. He writes: "Dearden's films are decent, empty and plodding and his association with Michael Relph is a fair representative of the British preference for bureaucratic cinema. It stands for the underlining of obvious meaning".

More positively, for Brian McFarlane, the Australian writer on film: "Dearden's films offer, among other rewards, a fascinating barometer of public taste at its most nearly consensual over three decades".

The British Film Institute's Screenonline website writes "As film studies grope beyond auteurism towards a greater recognition of the importance of collaboration and versatility, the contribution of Basil Dearden and his collaborator Michael Relph might be more generously acknowledged." Alex Barrett writes that Dearden and Relph "genuinely deserve to be placed alongside Powell and Pressburger as one of the most significant double-acts in British cinema."

Regular Ealing cinematographer Douglas Slocombe enjoyed working with Dearden personally, describing him as the 'most competent' of the directors he worked with at Ealing.

Theresa FitzGerald described Dearden as "par excellence, the journeyman-director of British cinema, standing in much the same relation to Ealing as, say, Michael Curtiz did to Warner Brothers."

A 2022 retrospective of Dearden's work by the Deutsches Filminstitut called him, "one of the most outstanding directors of classic British cinema.... Their “studio cinema” fell into disrepute as a “new wave” emerged in Britain as well. Yet Dearden’s craftsmanship in particular continues to set his films apart to this day."

== Filmography ==
=== Film ===
Year	Title	Functioned as			Notes
Year	Title	Director	Writer	Producer	Notes
1938	This Man Is News	No	Yes	No	
1940	Let George Do It!	No	Yes	Associate	
1940	Spare a Copper	No	Yes	Associate	
1941	Turned Out Nice Again	No	Uncredited	Associate	
1942	The Black Sheep of Whitehall	Yes	No	No	Co-directed with Will Hay
1942	The Goose Steps Out	Yes	No	No	Co-directed with Will Hay
1943	The Bells Go Down	Yes	No	No	
1943	My Learned Friend	Yes	No	No	Co-directed with Will Hay
1944	The Halfway House	Yes	No	No	
1944	They Came to a City	Yes	Yes	No	
1945	Dead of Night	Yes	No	No	Segments: "Hearse Driver" and "Linking Narrative
1946	The Captive Heart	Yes	No	No	
1947	Frieda	Yes	No	No	
1948	Saraband for Dead Lovers	Yes	No	No	
1949	Train of Events	Yes	Yes	No	Segments: "The Prisoner-of-War" and "The Actor"
1950	The Blue Lamp	Yes	No	No	
1950	Cage of Gold	Yes	No	No	
1951	Pool of London	Yes	No	No	
1952	I Believe in You	Yes	Yes	Yes	
1952	The Gentle Gunman	Yes	No	No	
1953	The Square Ring	Yes	No	Uncredited	
1954	The Rainbow Jacket	Yes	No	No	
1955	The Ship That Died of Shame	Yes	Yes	Uncredited	
1955	Out of the Clouds	Yes	No	No	
1956	Who Done It?	Yes	No	Uncredited	
1956	The Green Man	Uncredited	No	No	
1957	The Smallest Show on Earth	Yes	No	No	
1958	Violent Playground	Yes	No	No	
1959	Sapphire	Yes	No	No	
1960	The League of Gentlemen	Yes	No	No	
1960	Man in the Moon	Yes	Uncredited	No	
1961	Victim	Yes	No	Yes	
1961	The Secret Partner	Yes	No	No	
1962	All Night Long	Yes	No	Uncredited	
1962	Life for Ruth	Yes	No	Yes	
1963	A Place to Go	Yes	No	No	
1963	The Mind Benders	Yes	No	No	
1964	Woman of Straw	Yes	No	No	
1965	Masquerade	Yes	No	No	
1966	Khartoum	Yes	No	No	
1968	Only When I Larf	Yes	No	No	
1969	The Assassination Bureau	Yes	No	No	
1970	The Man Who Haunted Himself	Yes	Yes	No	

==== Producers only ====
- The Ghost of St. Michael's (1941, associate)
- Rockets Galore! (1957)
- Davy (1957)
- Desert Mice (1959)

=== Television ===
Year	Title	Functioned as			Notes
Year	Title	Director	Writer	Producer	Notes
1959–60	The Four Just Men	Yes	No	No	13 episodes
1971	The Persuaders!	Yes	No	No	3 episodes

== Awards and nominations ==
Institution	Year	Category	Work	Result
British Academy Film Awards	1960	Best Film	Sapphire	Nominated
British Academy Film Awards	1960	Outstanding British Film	Sapphire	Won
Cannes Film Festival	1946	Palme d'Or	The Captive Heart	Nominated
Locarno Film Festival	1946	Most Interesting Screenplay	Dead of Night	Won
New York Film Critics Circle	1959	Best Director	Sapphire	3rd Place
San Sebastián International Film Festival	1954	Grand Prize	The Rainbow Jacket	Nominated
Venice Film Festival	1947	Golden Lion	Frieda	Nominated
Venice Film Festival	1950	Golden Lion	The Blue Lamp	Nominated
Venice Film Festival	1961	Golden Lion	Victim	Nominated
