= Angus MacPhail =

British screenwriter (1903–1962)

- Born: 8 April 1903; Lewisham, London
- Died: 22 April 1962 (aged 59); Sussex, England
- Education: Westminster School; Trinity Hall, Cambridge
- Occupation: Screenwriter
- Writing career
- Genres: Screenwriting, film

Angus Roy MacPhail (8 April 1903 – 22 April 1962) was a British screenwriter who was active from the late 1920s onwards. He is best remembered for his work with Alfred Hitchcock and for coining the term "MacGuffin".

== Early life and education ==
The son of merchant clerk Angus MacPhail and Fanny Maud (née Karlowa), he was born in Lewisham, London, and educated at Westminster School and Trinity Hall, Cambridge where he studied English and edited Granta. At Cambridge, he was a close friend of fellow Old Westminsters Ivor Montagu, later a filmmaker, who described MacPhail as "a red-haired and rather gauche Scot from Blackheath", and Arnold Haskell, later a dance critic and headmaster of the Royal Ballet School.

== Career ==
He began to work in the film business in 1926, writing subtitles for silent films. He began writing his scenarios for Gaumont British Studios and later Ealing Studios under Sir Michael Balcon. During World War II, he made films for the Ministry of Information. MacPhail wrote several screenplays for director Alfred Hitchcock. One of the latter's favourite devices for driving the plots of his stories and creating suspense was what he called the "MacGuffin". His old friend Ivor Montagu, who worked with Hitchcock on several of his British films, attributes the coining of the term to MacPhail.

In 1929, MacPhail undertook early market research via mass questionnaires into film viewers' preferences on behalf of Sidney Bernstein.

== Filmography ==
- Balaclava (1928)
- A Light Woman (1928)
- A South Sea Bubble (1928)
- The Return of the Rat (1929)
- The Crooked Billet (1929)
- The Wrecker (1929)
- Taxi for Two (1929)
- City of Play (1929)
- Their Son (1929)
- Symphony in Two Flats (1930)
- A Warm Corner (1930)
- The Sport of Kings (1931)
- Third Time Lucky (1931)
- The Ringer (1931)
- A Night in Montmartre (1931)
- The Man They Couldn't Arrest (1931)
- Hindle Wakes (1931)
- The Ghost Train (1931)
- The Calendar (1931)
- Michael and Mary (1931)
- Sunshine Susie (1931)
- Love on Wheels (1932)
- Marry Me (1932)
- Lord Babs (1932)
- The Frightened Lady (1932)
- White Face (1932)
- The Faithful Heart (1932)
- Love on Wheels (1932)
- A Cuckoo in the Nest (1933)
- Channel Crossing (1933)
- The Good Companions (1933)
- I Was a Spy (1933)
- A Yank at Oxford (1938)
- Kicking the Moon Around (1938)
- Trouble Brewing (1939)
- The Four Just Men (1939)
- Return to Yesterday (1940)
- Busman's Honeymoon (1940)
- Let George Do It! (1940)
- Saloon Bar (1940)
- Sailors Three (1940)
- The Ghost of St. Michael's (1941)
- The Big Blockade (1942)
- The Black Sheep of Whitehall (1942)
- The Next of Kin (1942)
- The Foreman Went to France (1942)
- The Goose Steps Out (1942)
- Went the Day Well? (1942)
- Go to Blazes (1942, short)
- My Learned Friend (1943)
- Bon Voyage (1944, short)
- Aventure Malgache (1944, short)
- The Halfway House (1944)
- Fiddlers Three (1944)
- Champagne Charlie (1944)
- Dead of Night (1945)
- Spellbound (1945)
- The Captive Heart (1946)
- The Loves of Joanna Godden (1947)
- Frieda (1947)
- It Always Rains on Sunday (1947)
- Whisky Galore! (1949)
- Train of Events (1949)
- The Wrong Man (1956)
