= George Woodbridge (actor) =

English actor (1907–1973)

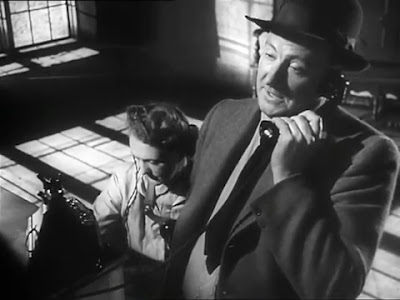
- Woodbridge in Green for Danger (1946)
- Born: 16 February 1907; Exeter, Devon, England
- Died: 31 March 1973 (aged 66); Tottenham, England
- Years active: 1928–73

George Arthur Woodbridge (16 February 1907 – 31 March 1973) was an English actor who appeared in films, television, and theatre ranging from the 1930s to the 1970s. Woodbridge's ruddy-cheeked complexion and West Country accent meant he often played publicans, policemen or yokels, most prominently in horror and comedy films alongside Christopher Lee and Peter Cushing.

== Early life ==
Woodbridge was born in Exeter, England. Raised in Devon, he lived there most of his life. He died in London in 1973.

== Career ==
Woodbridge became a Chief Steward in the Merchant Navy before becoming an actor, first appearing on the London stage in 1928. He made his film debut in 1940 in The Big Blockade, he went on to appear in films such as Green for Danger (1946), The Fallen Idol (1948), The Queen of Spades (1949), Stryker of the Yard (1953), An Inspector Calls (1954), and Richard III (1955).

His horror film roles include the innkeeper in Dracula (1958) and its sequel Dracula: Prince of Darkness (1966), as well as parts in The Revenge of Frankenstein (1958), Jack the Ripper (1959), The Flesh and the Fiends (1959), The Curse of the Werewolf (1961), The Reptile (1966) and Doomwatch (1972). He also appeared in two M.R. James adaptations on television, in the Mystery and Imagination episode "Room 13" and the 1968 Omnibus episode, "Whistle and I'll Come to You".

His jovial manner lent itself to comedy films as well, including An Alligator Named Daisy (1955), Three Men in a Boat (1956), Two-Way Stretch (1960), Raising the Wind (1961), What a Carve Up! (1961), Only Two Can Play (1962), Nurse on Wheels (1963), Heavens Above! (1963), Carry On Jack (1963), Take a Girl Like You (1970), All the Way Up (1970), and Up Pompeii (1971).

He also appeared as the sergeant in the Stryker of the Yard featurettes during the 1950s.

He first appeared on television before the Second World War, and went on to appear in Jude the Obscure (1971), Adam Adamant Lives!, Armchair Theatre, Benny Hill, Dixon of Dock Green, The Forsyte Saga, The Persuaders! and Softly Softly.

He gained popularity late in his career as the titular puppet-maker in the children's TV show Inigo Pipkin. He died five weeks into the filming of the second series, an occurrence which was dealt with in the programme's storyline. The series continued for another seven years however under the title, Pipkins.

== Selected filmography ==
- Tower of Terror (1941) - Gruppenfuhrer Rudolf Jurgens
- The Black Sheep of Whitehall (1942) - Male Nurse
- The Big Blockade (1942) - Quisling
- The Day Will Dawn (1942) - Journalist Sitting at Bar in Pub (uncredited)
- The Life and Death of Colonel Blimp (1943) - Man with Debris Clearing Unit (uncredited)
- Escape to Danger (1943) - (uncredited)
- I See a Dark Stranger (1946) - Walter
- Temptation Harbour (1947) - Frost
- Green for Danger (1947) - Det.-Sgt. Hendricks
- The October Man (1947) - Grey
- Blanche Fury (1948) - Aimes
- Escape (1948) - Farmer Browning (uncredited)
- My Brother Jonathan (1948) - Stevens
- The Red Shoes (1948) - Doorman - Covent Garden (uncredited)
- The Fallen Idol (1948) - Police Sergeant
- Silent Dust (1949) - Foreman
- The Queen of Spades (1949) - Vassili
- Children of Chance (1949) - Butcher
- Double Confession (1950) - Sgt. Sawnton
- The Black Rose (1950) - Warder (uncredited)
- The Naked Heart (1950) - Samuel Chapdelaine
- Murder in the Cathedral (1951) - 2nd Tempter
- Cloudburst (1951) - Sergeant Ritchie
- The Crimson Pirate (1952) - Pirate (uncredited)
- The Story of Gilbert and Sullivan (1953) - Reporter
- The Flanagan Boy (1953) - Police Inspector (uncredited)
- Stryker of the Yard (1953) - Sgt. Hawker
- An Inspector Calls (1954) - Fish & Chip Shop Owner
- Conflict of Wings (1954) - 'Old Circular'
- For Better, for Worse (1954) - Alf
- The Crowded Day (1954) - Mr. Bunting's Friend
- Third Party Risk (1954) - Inspector Goldfinch
- Isn't Life Wonderful! (1954) - Cockie
- The Green Carnation (1954) - Farmer
- Mad About Men (1954) - Fisherman Outside Pub (uncredited)
- Companions in Crime (1954) - Sergeant Hawker
- Passage Home (1955) - Yorkie
- The Constant Husband (1955) - Old Bailey Warder (uncredited)
- Richard III (1955) - Lord Mayor of London
- An Alligator Named Daisy (1955) - PC Jorkins (uncredited)
- A Yank in Ermine (1955) - Landlord
- Lost (1956) - Mr. Carter, garage proprietor/taxi driver (uncredited)
- Now and Forever (1956) - Policeman Charlie (uncredited)
- Eyewitness (1956) - Hospital Security Man
- Three Men in a Boat (1956) - Policeman
- The Passionate Stranger (1957) - 1st Landlord
- The Good Companions (1957) - Ripe Gentleman
- A King in New York (1957) - Member of Atomic Commission
- High Flight (1957) - Farmer
- A Tale of Two Cities (1958) - Dover Innkeeper (uncredited)
- Dracula (1958) - Landlord
- The Moonraker (1958) - Captain Lowry
- The Revenge of Frankenstein (1958) - Janitor
- The Son of Robin Hood (1958) - Little John
- Breakout (1959) - Landlord (uncredited)
- Jack the Ripper (1959) - Blake
- The Siege of Pinchgut (1959) - Newspaper Editor (uncredited)
- The Mummy (1959) - Police Constable
- Two-Way Stretch (1960) - Chief P.O. Jenkins
- The Flesh and the Fiends (1960) - Dr. Ferguson
- The Curse of the Werewolf (1961) - Dominique
- Raising the Wind (1961) - Yorkshire Orchestra Leader
- What a Carve Up! (1961) - Dr. Edward Broughton
- Only Two Can Play (1962) - Farmer (uncredited)
- The Iron Maiden (1962) - Mr. Ludge
- Nurse on Wheels (1963) - Mr. Beacon
- Heavens Above! (1963) - Bishop
- The Scarlet Blade (1963) - Town Crier (uncredited)
- Carry On Jack (1963) - Ned
- The Secret of My Success (1965) - Pub Regular (uncredited)
- Dracula: Prince of Darkness (1966) - Landlord
- Take a Girl Like You (1969) - Harry - Publican
- Where's Jack? (1969) - Hangman
- All the Way Up (1970) - Landlord
- Up Pompeii (1971) - Fat Bather
- Doomwatch (1972) - Ferry Skipper
- Diamonds on Wheels (1973) - PC Andrew
