= Aventure Malgache =

1944 British film by Alfred Hitchcock

Aventure malgache
- Directed by: Alfred Hitchcock
- Written by: Jules François Clermont (story); Angus MacPhail (uncredited)
- Starring: "Paul Clarus", Paul Bonifas
- Cinematography: Günther Krampf
- Music by: Benjamin Frankel
- Distributed by: Milestone Films
- Release date: 1944
- Running time: 31 minutes
- Country: United Kingdom
- Language: French

Aventure Malgache (also known as Madagascar Landing) is a 1944 British short propaganda film in French directed by Alfred Hitchcock for the British Ministry of Information. The title means Malagasy Adventure in English.

There are conflicting reports as to the true inspiration for the film, lawyer Jules François Clermont or actor Claude Dauphin. Some sources claim the film is based on the real-life activities of Jules François Clermont, who wrote and starred in the film under the name "Paul Clarus". In September 2011, The Daily Telegraph published an article noting that writer and actor Claude Dauphin had collaborated with Hitchcock to recount his own experiences of operating an underground radio station in Nazi occupied France.

== Plot summary ==
Paul Clarus, a French actor, is chatting with his fellow actors (the "Molière Players") as they put on their makeup before a performance. He reminisces about a very unpleasant Vichy official, the Chef de la Sûreté, whom he knew when he was part of the Resistance on the island of Madagascar during the Second World War. The events on Madagascar are shown in flashback.

Paul Clarus pretended to be loyal to the Vichy official, while he simultaneously worked as the head of the Resistance movement. He ran an illegal pro-Resistance radio station "Madagascar Libre", and helped arrange numerous boats to take loyal Frenchmen out of the island to safety. Finally when the Vichy government falls, we see that the Vichy official is nothing but a turncoat; in his office he rapidly replaces a portrait of Marshal Philippe Pétain with a portrait of Queen Victoria, and he changes his bottle of Vichy water for bottles of Scotch and soda water.

== Cast ==
- Paul Bonifas as Michel – Chef de la Sûreté (Leader of the Sûreté)
- Paul Clarus as himself
- Jean Dattas as man behind Michel, reading a telegram
- Andre Frere as Pierre
- Guy Le Feuvre as General
- Paulette Preney as Yvonne

== Reception ==
Sight and Sound wrote: "For all its brief running-time and slender budget, Aventure Malgache abounds in Hitchcockian touches. ... Aventure Malgache may be minor Hitchcock, but it's unmistakably the authentic article."

Variety wrote: "Seen today, Malgache seems a minor but entertaining slice of Hitcheockian cheekiness."

== Home media ==
Milestone Films has released Aventure Malgache, paired with another 1944 French language Hitchcock short film Bon Voyage, on DVD and VHS.

== See also ==
- List of World War II short films
