= Bon Voyage (1944 film) =

1944 film by Alfred Hitchcock

- Directed by: Alfred Hitchcock
- Written by: Angus MacPhail; J.O.C. Orton
- Story by: Arthur Calder-Marshall
- Starring: John Blythe
- Cinematography: Günther Krampf
- Music by: Benjamin Frankel
- Distributed by: Milestone Films
- Release date: 1944
- Running time: 26 minutes
- Country: United Kingdom
- Language: French

Bon Voyage is a 1944 short French language propaganda film directed by Alfred Hitchcock for the British Ministry of Information. It was written by Angus MacPhail and J.O.C. Orton.

Although the film is short (26 minutes), it uses two radically different interpretations of the same events, a technique not unlike that used by Akira Kurosawa in Rashomon (1950), Errol Morris in The Thin Blue Line (1988), and Fernando Meirelles in Cidade de Deus (2002).

== Plot ==
The story is told in flashback, once from the perspective of the protagonist, and then a second time with a deeper understanding that is provided by the intelligence officer in London.

A Scotsman, RAF Sgt. John Dougal, a downed Royal Air Force air gunner who was previously a prisoner of war, explains how he travelled with great difficulty through German-occupied France. He was accompanied most of the way by a companion who was another escaped prisoner of war, and they were both aided by various courageous Resistance workers. His companion gave him a letter to deliver once he reached London, supposedly a very personal and private letter.

However, when we see the Intelligence officer's explanation of the same events, it becomes clear that the gunner's companion, who was supposedly helping him along, was in fact a Gestapo spy, who murdered several of the Resistance fighters and reported the rest to the authorities, and that the "personal letter" the gunner was going to deliver in London contains secret information that would have helped the enemy.

== Cast ==
- John Blythe as Sergeant John Dougall (uncredited)
- The Molière Players (uncredited)

== Production ==
Hitchcock had offered his services to the British government after his former producer in the UK, Michael Balcon, made a statement about overweight British directors who had left the country for Hollywood "while we who are left behind short-handed are trying to harness the films to our great national effort." Later, Hitchcock told François Truffaut "I felt the need to make a little contribution to the war effort, and I was both overweight and overage for military service. I knew that if I did nothing, I'd regret it for the rest of my life; it was important to me to do something and also to get right into the atmosphere of war."

Hitchcock soon began development of Bon Voyage, which he described as "a little story about an RAF man who is being escorted out of France through the Resistance channels. His escort was a Polish officer. When he arrives in London, the RAF man is interrogated by an officer of the Free French Forces, who informs him that his Polish escort was really a Gestapo man. Upon that startling revelation, we go through the journey across France all over again, but this time we show all sorts of details that the young RAF man hadn't noticed at first, various indications of the Pole's complicity with the Gestapo detail. At the end of the story there was a twist showing how the Polish officer had been trapped. At the same time, the RAF man learned that the young French girl who'd helped them, and had spotted the Pole as a spy, had been killed by him."

Hitchcock cast John Blythe in the lead role, and the remaining members of the cast came from the Molière Players, who had escaped from France after the German invasion, and whose names were not revealed so as to protect their relatives still in France.

Bon Voyage was filmed from 20 January to 25 February at Associated British Studios. Hitchcock was paid £10 a week.

It is uncertain whether Bon Voyage – which was a disappointment as a propaganda film to the Ministry of Information – was ever shown in Britain or in France. It and Aventure malgache (1944) were shelved by the Ministry and were not seen again until the 1990s, when they were restored by the British Film Institute.

== Home media ==
Milestone Films has released Bon Voyage, paired with the other 1944 French language Hitchcock short film Aventure malgache, on VHS and DVD.
