= The Goose Steps Out =

- UK poster by Dudley Pout
- Directed by: Will Hay; Basil Dearden
- Written by: Angus MacPhail; John Dighton
- Produced by: Michael Balcon
- Starring: Will Hay; Frank Pettingell; Julien Mitchell; Charles Hawtrey; Peter Ustinov
- Cinematography: Ernest Palmer
- Edited by: Ray Pitt
- Music by: Bretton Byrd
- Distributed by: Ealing Studios
- Release dates: 28 August 1942 (UK); 12 February 1943 (US)
- Running time: 75 minutes (6,756ft)
- Country: United Kingdom
- Language: English

The Goose Steps Out is a 1942 British comedy film directed by Will Hay and Basil Dearden, and starring Hay, Frank Pettingell, Julien Mitchell, Charley Hawtrey and Peter Ustinov. It is a comedy of mistaken identity, with Hay acting as a German spy and also an Englishman who is his double. It was Ustinov's film debut.

== Plot ==
During the Second World War, William Potts is discovered to be an exact double of a German spy who the British have just captured. Potts is flown into Nazi Germany to impersonate the spy and instructed to seek out and bring back details of a new German secret weapon.

On arrival, however, Potts is placed in charge of a group of apparently rabidly-fascist young students who are being trained to work as spies in Britain. Potts attempts to undermine this by convincing the youngsters that the proper British way of saluting a great leader is to apply the V-sign, which they therefore do repeatedly and enthusiastically in the direction of a portrait of the Führer. At a function where he hopes to gather information about the weapon (a gasfire bomb), Potts succeeds only in getting blind drunk and admitting that he is a British agent. Luckily, some members of his class of Nazi youths turn out to be sympathetic Austrians and they help him obtain the secret he seeks. Potts and his new friends eventually commandeer a plane and fly back to Britain, crashing in a tree outside the War Office in London.

== Cast ==
- Will Hay as William Potts/Muller
- Charles Hawtrey as Max
- Frank Pettingell as Professor Hoffman
- Julien Mitchell as General Von Glotz
- Peter Ustinov as Krauss
- Barry Morse as Kurt
- Leslie Harcourt as Vagel
- Peter Croft as Hans
- Ann Firth as Lena
- Ray Lovell as Schmidt
- Jeremy Hawk as ADC
- Aubrey Mallalieu as Rector
- John Williams as Major Bishop
- Lawrence O'Madden as Colonel Truscott
- William Hartnell as German officer at railway station (uncredited)
- Leslie Dwyer as German on train (uncredited)

== Direction ==
Will Hay shared directorial credit with Basil Dearden following their previous collaboration, The Black Sheep of Whitehall (1942). Art Director Michael Relph described Dearden and Hay's input as directors: "Basil was very expert at directing comedy, and that is what he contributed when working with Will Hay. Hay was important as a star, and he could more or less dictate what he wanted to direct, but really he did not direct. Basil directed and supplied all the expertise that Hay probably lacked." Actor Barry Morse had a different take on the directorial responsibilities: "Basil Dearden was largely concerned with purely technical things, angles, lenses, lighting details. He didn't have a very active part, it seemed to me, in the actual performance directing. That was something which Will Hay had a certain amount to do with."

== Reception ==
The Monthly Film Bulletin wrote: "There are a number of opportunities in this film for Will Hay to display his talents both as a schoolmaster (but in Nazi uniform) and as a cheerful bungler. His stooge, Charles Hawtrey, is with him, and Frank Pettingell, Julien Mitchell and Peter Ustinov nobly aid and abet him. The film is inclined to be patchy, but is reasonably good fast fun all the same."

Kine Weekly wrote: "Will Hay works hard in a dual role, but the humour depends largely upon familiar slapstick situations."

In the Sunday Times Dilys Powell wrote: "The Goose Steps Out gives us Will Hay as a British Agent lecturing to the German espionage class on British pronunciation and the life of the pub. This is good Will Hay and so is the attempted theft from the gas bomb laboratory: the slapstick in the plane I found more monotonous and less convivial. TV Guide called this film "a funny programme."

In Forever Ealing, George Perry wrote, " In the climate of 1942, when British morale was at its lowest, what may now seem jingoistic acted as an innocent safety valve, and the film was popularly received."

== Home media ==
In 2017 to celebrate the 75th Anniversary of the film, a digitally restored version was released on DVD/Blu-Ray by Studio Canal. The special features include the Will Hay short film, Go to Blazes (1942), an Interview with Graham Rinaldi, author of the 2009 Hay biography and a Hay audio featurette by Simon Heffer, part of the BBC Radio 3 series, The Essay: British Film Comedians.
