= Fiddlers Three (1944 film) =

- UK theatrical poster
- Directed by: Harry Watt
- Screenplay by: Angus MacPhail; Diana Morgan
- Produced by: Michael Balcon
- Starring: Tommy Trinder; Sonnie Hale; Frances Day; Francis L. Sullivan; Diana Decker; Elisabeth Welch; James Robertson Justice
- Cinematography: Wilkie Cooper
- Edited by: Eily Boland
- Music by: Spike Hughes
- Production company: Ealing Films
- Distributed by: Ealing Distribution
- Release date: October 1944 (UK)
- Running time: 88 minutes (65 minutes USA edit)
- Country: United Kingdom
- Language: English

Fiddlers Three (U.S. title: While Nero Fiddled) is a 1944 British black-and-white musical comedy film directed by Harry Watt and starring Tommy Trinder, Sonnie Hale, Frances Day, Francis L. Sullivan, Diana Decker and Elisabeth Welch. It was written by Angus MacPhail and Diana Morgan, and produced by Michael Balcon.

The film follows the adventures of two sailors and a Wren who are struck by lightning and transported back to Ancient Rome, where they are accepted as seers. The title comes from the nursery rhyme "Old King Cole".

It is a loose sequel to the 1940 film Sailors Three which also starred Trinder.

== Plot ==
Tommy Taylor and "The Professor", two sailors returning from leave to Portsmouth on a tandem bicycle, rescue Lydia, a Wren, who had been hitch-hiking on the road and was assaulted by an over-amorous driver. They get a puncture as they reach Stonehenge. The professor tells them of an old legend that those caught at Stonehenge at midnight on midsummer's night are transported back in time. Moments later the area is struck by lightning. Nearby a group of Roman soldiers have suddenly appeared whom they initially mistake for members of ENSA. However, they swiftly prove to be genuine Romans who arrest them and threaten instant death unless they can prove they are druids.

== Cast ==
- Tommy Trinder as Tommy Taylor
- Frances Day as Poppaea
- Sonnie Hale as 'The Professor'
- Francis L. Sullivan as Nero
- Elisabeth Welch as Thora
- Mary Clare as Volumnia
- Diana Decker as Lydia
- Ernest Milton as Titus
- James Robertson Justice as Centurion of the 8th Legion
- Russell Thorndike as High Priest
- Frederick Piper as auctioneer
- Alec Mango as secretary
- Danny Green as Lictor
- Frank Tickle as master of ceremonies
- Kay Kendall as slave girl who asks about her future at orgy
- Robert Wyndham as lion-keeper

== Reception ==
=== Box office ===
The film was only moderately successful at the British Box Office but proved to be a major hit in Australia.

=== Critical ===
The Monthly Film Bulletin wrote: "The film is mainly a vehicle for Trinder's fun-making, aided and abetted by Sonnie Hale. As such it is a success, and there are a number of very funny sequences. In places the film drags owing to lack of sparkle in the dialogue. Francis Sullivan makes a suave and fleshy Nero and Frances Day a suitably lascivious Poppeia. There are a number of good songs and the art direction is both lavish and attractive."

Sky Movies wrote, "the stars look as though they're having fun, which was just the tonic for wartime audiences, though it all looks less than sparkling now."

George Perry wrote in Forever Ealing, "the film is not of great consequence. The script ... was thick with laboured gags likening aspects of Roman times to wartime Britain."

Graeme Clark wrote in The Spinning Image, "played with a mixture of cheeky charm and a sly wink from the cast, and notable for its casting of black singer and actress Elisabeth Welch in a refreshingly non-stereotypical role for its day, if you catch the references then you should have fun with Fiddlers Three. Yes, it's nonsense, but it's nonsense well done."

Time Out called the film a "cheeky wartime British comedy with odd imaginative touch (associate producer Robert Hamer reshot a good deal of it)."
