= George Margo =

American actor (1915–2002)

George Margo (1915 – 2002) was an American actor who appeared mainly in British films and television shows.

== Selected filmography ==
- Circle of Danger (1951) - Sim (uncredited)
- Hell Is Sold Out (1951) - American Soldier at Cafe
- The Red Beret (1953) - American Crewman
- The Saint's Return (1953) - Lennar's Henchman
- Radio Cab Murder (1954) - Man in the taxi (uncredited)
- Lilacs in the Spring (1954) - Reporter
- Little Red Monkey (1955) - American Sailor (uncredited)
- Joe MacBeth (1955) - Second Assassin
- Who Done It? (1956) - Barakov
- A Touch of the Sun (1956) - Howard Cann
- Zarak (1956) - Chief jailer
- The Key Man (1957) - Jeff, Photographer
- After the Ball (1957) - Tony Pastor
- Windom's Way (1957) - Police Officer Lansang
- Mark of the Phoenix (1958) - Emilson
- Make Mine a Million (1959) - Assistant
- The Mouse That Roared (1959) - O'Hara (uncredited)
- The Adding Machine (1969) - Gateman
- The Revolutionary (1970)
- Captain Apache (1971) - Sheriff
