= British comedy films =

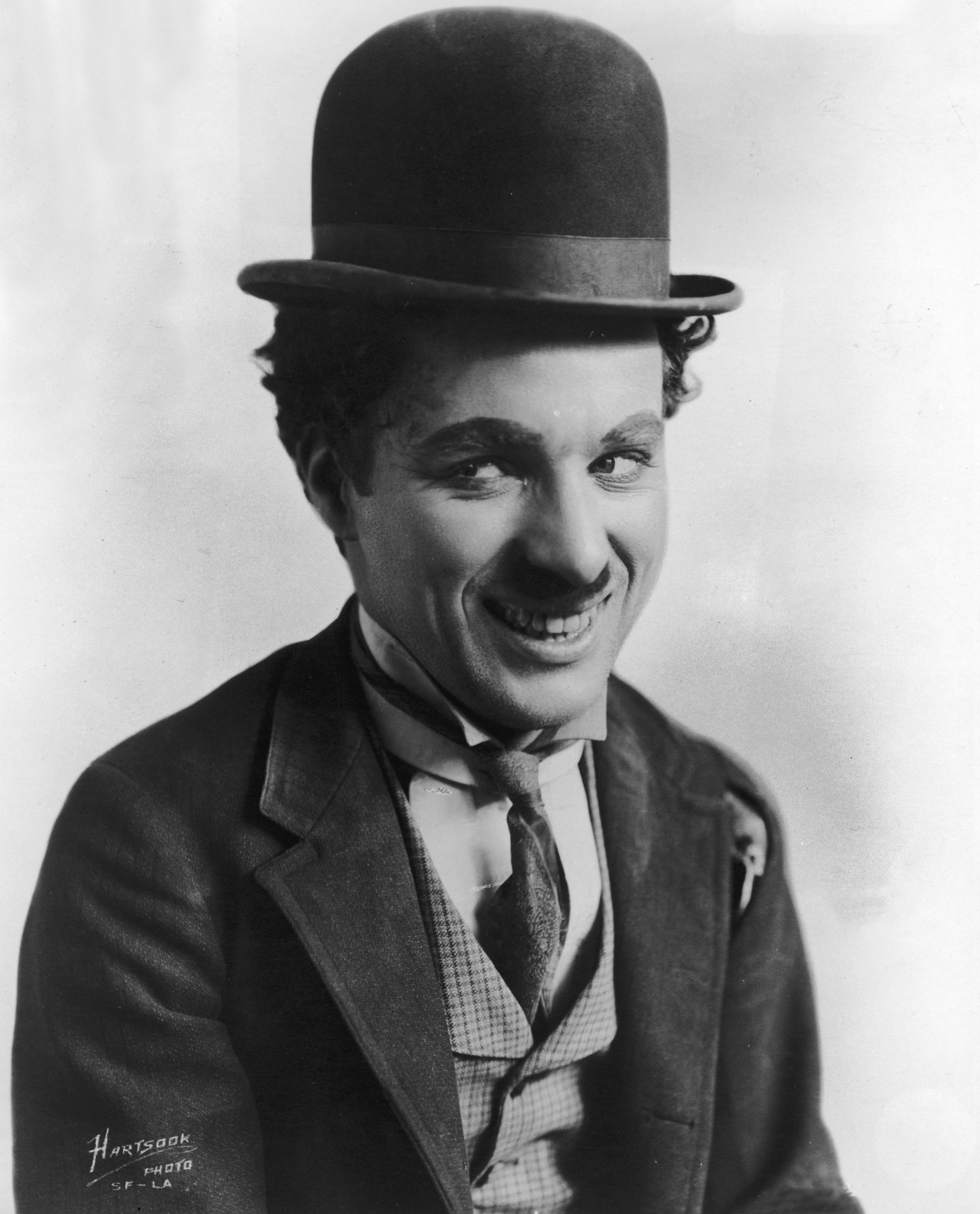
English comic Charlie Chaplin

British comedy films are comedy films produced in the United Kingdom. In the early 1930s, film adaptations of stage farces were popular, notable names being Old Mother Riley, the Crazy Gang, Arthur Askey and Will Hay in Gainsborough comedies. British comedy films are numerous, but among the most notable are the Ealing comedies, the 1950s work of the Boulting Brothers, and innumerable popular comedy series including the St Trinian's films, the Doctor series, and the long-running Carry On films. Some of the best known British film comedy stars include Will Hay, George Formby, Norman Wisdom, Alec Guinness, Peter Sellers and the Monty Python team. Other actors associated with British comedy films include Ian Carmichael, Terry-Thomas, Margaret Rutherford, Irene Handl and Leslie Phillips. Most British comedy films of the early 1970s were spin-offs of television series.

Recent successful films include the working-class comedies Brassed Off (1996) and The Full Monty (1997), the more middle class Richard Curtis-scripted films Four Weddings and a Funeral (1994) and Notting Hill (1999) the pop-culture referencing Three Flavours Cornetto Trilogy (Shaun of the Dead, Hot Fuzz and The World's End), and a movie based on a real-life event The Boat That Rocked (2009).

== History ==
=== 1930s–1950s ===
In the United Kingdom, film adaptations of stage farces were popular in the early 1930s, while the music hall tradition strongly influenced film comedy into the 1940s with Will Hay and George Formby among the top comedy stars of the time. In England in the late 1940s, Ealing Studios achieved popular success as well as critical acclaim with a series of films known collectively as the "Ealing comedies", from 1947 to 1957. They usually included a degree of social comment, and featured ensemble casts which often included Alec Guinness or Stanley Holloway. Among the most famous examples were Kind Hearts and Coronets (1949), The Lavender Hill Mob (1951) and The Ladykillers (1955).

In the 1950s, the British film industry produced a number of highly successful film series, however, including the Doctor series, the St. Trinian's films and the increasingly bawdy Carry On films. John and Roy Boulting also wrote and directed a series of successful satires, including Private's Progress (1956) and I'm All Right, Jack (1959). As in the United States, in the next decade much of this talent would move into television.

Norman Wisdom was cast in a series of comedy films produced between 1953 and 1966 featuring his hapless onscreen character that was often called Norman Pitkin.

=== 1960s–1980s ===
In the late 1950s, as the United States, the television industry has become a serious competition over the film industry. So from the early 1960s, much of the British comedies passes through television.

==== Monty Python team ====
Monty Python team, created in 1969, is composed of six members : Graham Chapman, John Cleese, Eric Idle, Michael Palin, Terry Jones and Terry Gilliam.

Even if most British comedy films of the early 1970s were spin-offs of television series, including Dad's Army and On the Buses, the greatest successes, however, came with the films of the Monty Python team, including And Now for Something Completely Different (1971), Monty Python and the Holy Grail (1975) and Monty Python's Life of Brian (1979).

One of the most famous movies of the 1980s (in part realized by Monty Python team) is A Fish Called Wanda, a multicultural movie between British and American cultures, with the American actress Jamie Lee Curtis.

To finish, Monty Python produced in 1983 Monty Python's The Meaning of Life.

=== 1990s–2010s ===
One of the major developments of the 1990s was the re-emergence of the romantic comedy film, like Four Weddings and a Funeral (1994), Sliding Doors (1998), and Notting Hill (1999). Recent successful films, more representative of British humour were the working class comedies Brassed Off (1996) and The Full Monty (1997).

==== Comedies with Rowan Atkinson ====
In 1990 Rowan Atkinson created a series for TV Mr. Bean, which made the actor Rowan Atkinson famous all around the world. Later, he played in two movies based on 'Mr Bean' : Bean in 1997, and Mr. Bean's Holiday in 2007.

Later, he parodied the James Bond film series in the spy series Johnny English, consisting of three films releasing from 2003 to 2018, distributed by Universal Pictures.

==== Comedies about India ====
Some British comedies examined the role of the Asian community in British life, including Bhaji on the Beach (1993), East Is East (1999), Bend It Like Beckham (2002), Anita and Me (2003) and Death at a Funeral (2007).

Some other comedies takes place in India, such as The Best Exotic Marigold Hotel (2012) and The Second Best Exotic Marigold Hotel (2015) with Judi Dench and Maggie Smith.
