= Dagenham Girl Pipers =

All-women pipe band based in London

- Established: 1930
- Location: London
- Pipe major: Edith Turnbull
- Tartan: Royal Stewart
- Website: dagenhamgirlpipers.com

The Dagenham Girl Pipers were a female pipe band based in Dagenham, Greater London. The band was founded in 1930, and toured extensively as a professional organisation before and after the Second World War, with several members performing during the war for the Entertainments National Service Association. Latterly, it became an amateur band under the leadership of the last pipe major, Sheila Hatcher.

== History ==
The band was formed in 1930 by Revd Joseph Waddington Graves, the minister of Osborne Hall Congregational church. He chose 12 girls from the Sunday school with an average age 11, and they had their first practice on 4 October under the direction of Pipe Major Douglas Scott-Taylor. The girls were initially taught in secret, as Taylor thought teaching women would damage his reputation.

The band's first performance was 18 months later, to an audience of journalists, who filmed the event. The band wore the Royal Stewart tartan.

By 1933 some of the girls had reached the school leaving age of 14 and Graves decided to make the band a professional organisation, with the girls as paid employees and himself as manager. The band was a success and by 1937 was fulfilling 400 engagements a year, sometimes with multiple bands on tour at the same time. Edith Turnbull and Peggy Iris were made pipe majors of the band.

The Girl Pipers toured to pre-war Germany, and at one performance Hitler was heard to remark: "I wish I had a band like that." The band was touring in the Black Forest in August 1939 when Graves became aware of the rising military tension, and the band curtailed their tour and returned to Britain, two weeks before World War II broke out. The group disbanded at the outbreak of World War II, but 10 girls were allowed to work full-time for the Entertainments National Service Association and others worked part-time. Peggy Iris and Margaret Fraser joined a concert party entertaining troops in Africa, giving over 1000 shows in three years, and were awarded the Africa Star.

After the war the band reformed as a professional organisation. David Land, who ran a theatrical agency in Dagenham, took over from Graves in 1948. The Girl Pipers became an amateur band in 1968 as it was uneconomical to continue as a professional group. The band continued to perform until November 2024, with around 15 active members under the leadership of Sheila Hatcher, who had been a member since 1958.

Historical records of the Dagenham Girl Pipers are held by the Barking and Dagenham Archive Service at Valence House Museum including photographs and papers of individual members.

== In popular culture ==
In an essay by Douglas Adams published in The Salmon of Doubt, Adams described the Dagenham Girl Pipers as a wonderful pipe band, writing "With all due respect and love to my dear wife, there are some things that, however loving or tender your wife may be, only a large pipe band can give you.".

In series 3, episode 9 of Bless this House, the Dagenham Girl Pipers are toasted by Sid James during a scene where Sid and Jean visit France.

The Dagenham Girl Pipers were often referred to by Eric Morecambe during episodes of The Morecambe and Wise Show.

The Dagenham Girl Pipers are credited, and appear briefly, in the 1956 Benny Hill film Who Done It?.

In Episode 5 of BBC Radio 4’s series, “Winston Back Home”. (05/05/1994) the eponymous Winston Hayballs mentions the Dagenham Girl Pipers.
