= Stryker of the Yard =

1953 film

- Theatrical release poster
- Directed by: Arthur Crabtree
- Written by: Lester Powell; Guy Morgan
- Starring: Clifford Evans; Susan Stephen; Jack Watling
- Music by: Lambert Williamson
- Production company: Republic Productions
- Release date: 1953
- Running time: 67 minutes
- Country: United Kingdom
- Language: English

Stryker of the Yard (also known as Stryker of Scotland Yard, Scotland Yard Cases and Inspector Stryker) is a 1953 British second feature ('B') crime film directed by Arthur Crabtree and starring Clifford Evans, Susan Stephen, Jack Watling and Eliot Makeham. It was written by Lester Powell and Guy Morgan.

The film comprises two episodes of the British television series Stryker of the Yard, edited together: "The Case of the Studio Payroll" and "The Case of Uncle Henry". A second compilation film, Companions in Crime, followed in 1954.

== TV series ==
The 15-episode TV series, starring Evans, George Woodbridge, and Tim Turner was produced by William N. Boyle in 1953–1954 and broadcast in the U.S. by ABC in 1957, and in Britain by ATV in 1962–1963. Host Tom Fallon introduced each episode, and at the end of each story intoned: "And it just goes to show that crime does not pay." The episode "The Case of Uncle Henry" is believed lost.

== Cast ==
(1) refers to "The Case of the Studio Payroll"; (2) refers to "The Case of Uncle Henry".

- Clifford Evans as Inspector Stryker (1, 2)
- Susan Stephen as Peggy Sinclair (1)
- Jack Watling as Tony Ashworth (1)
- Eliot Makeham as Uncle Henry Petheridge (2)
- George Woodbridge as Sergeant Hawker (1, 2)

== Reception ==
The Monthly Film Bulletin wrote: "To give this 'double-decker' a convincing appearance, it is introduced by an ex-Scotland Yard officer. This, however, cannot cover up the improbable plots and poor script. Not even the conscientious playing – notably by Eliot Makeham as Uncle Henry – succeeds in bringing the film to life."

In British Sound Films: The Studio Years 1928–1959 David Quinlan rated the film as "mediocre", writing: "Light-hearted, light-weight sleuthing; only Makeham brings it to life."
