= Boys Will Be Boys (1935 film) =

1935 British film by William Beaudine

- Opening titles
- Directed by: William Beaudine
- Written by: Robert Edmunds; Will Hay; J.B. Morton
- Starring: Will Hay; Gordon Harker; Jimmy Hanley
- Cinematography: Charles Van Enger
- Edited by: Alfred Roome
- Music by: Louis Levy; Bretton Byrd; Jack Beaver
- Distributed by: Gaumont British Distributors
- Release date: July 1935
- Running time: 80 minutes
- Country: United Kingdom
- Language: English

Boys Will Be Boys is a 1935 British comedy film directed by William Beaudine and starring Will Hay, Gordon Harker and Jimmy Hanley. It was written by Hay and Robert Edmunds based on characters created by J.B. Morton (as "Beachcomber"). In the original stories Narkover is a school specializing in gambling and extortion, and the headmaster is "Dr Smart-Allick".

== Plot ==
Alec Smart, who is engaged teaching in a prison, applies for the job of headmaster at a nearby public school to replace the previous headmaster who has been convicted of writing forged cheques and has just been sent to prison. Smart appeals to the Governor to write him a good reference which he pretends to. Afterwards he writes his real recommendation which is very negative about Smart's talents.

The trustee who works as the Governor's secretary, Faker Brown, persuades Smart to send the letter praising him, and forges the signature of the Governor on it. On the basis of the faked letter, Lady Dorking, who runs the Board of Governors appoints Smart to the job. This angers her deputy, Colonel Crableigh, who had favoured promoting his nephew, the Deputy head.

On his arrival at the school, Smart is treated to a boisterous reception by the unruly students led by the Head Boy, Cyril Brown, who is the son of Faker Brown. Narkover proves to be a breeding ground for young criminals, who prefer to spend their time playing cards rather than taking classes. After his initial attempts to stop their games, Smart himself ends up playing cards with the students. He gets off on the wrong foot with Colonel Crableigh but, in spite of Smart's obvious incompetence, Lady Dorking immediately takes a shine to him. Crableigh begins engineering a scheme to have Smart dismissed and replaced by his own nephew.

Soon after his arrival Smart is approached by Faker Brown, just released from prison, who blackmails him into giving a job as a steward at the school. Brown has his eye on the valuable jewels of Lady Dorking, in particular her diamond necklace, which she is due to be wearing on Founders Day which takes place a few days later. It involves a dinner and a rugby match between the school's old boys and the current students, with Smart persuaded to captain the school team.

On Founder's Day, Lady Dorking wears her best jewels. In the Headmaster's study, she is shown some conjuring tricks by Smart. Crableigh places Dorking's necklace in Smart's pocket in an attempt to incriminate him and have him dismissed. However, the necklace is then stolen by Faker who hides it in a decanter. After trying, and failing, to persuade him to give it back Smart takes it and hides it in a jewellery box due to be presented to Lady Dorking at the dinner.

Shortly before the presentation, the diamonds are again taken by the Head Boy Cyril Brown who picks the lock. He hides the necklace in a rugby ball, but before he can make off with it, the ball is taken by the referee in the match. Confusion then ensues as during the match, Faker and Cyril Brown try to recover the ball and make off with it while Smart tries to prevent them. Eventually Smart kicks the ball towards some police spectators and unmasks the villains in spite of Crableigh's attempts to have Smart arrested for the theft.

== Cast ==
- Will Hay as Dr Alec Smart
- Gordon Harker as Faker Brown
- Jimmy Hanley as Cyril Brown
- Davy Burnaby as Col. Crableigh
- Norma Varden as Lady Dorking
- Claude Dampier as Theo P. Finch
- Charles Farrell as Louis Brown
- Percy Walsh as Prison governor
- David Raeburn as Superintendent
- Ben Williams as prisoner (uncredited)
- Clive Dunn

== Production ==
His first production for Gainsborough Pictures, the film was a breakthrough role for Will Hay and helped establish him as a film star throughout the British Empire. The role of the bumbling schoolmaster, which he had first developed in his 1920s music hall act, would be reprised in another two of Hay's films, Good Morning, Boys and The Ghost of St. Michael's.

== Reception ==
The Monthly Film Bulletin wrote: "A crazy and hilarious farce based on the 'Narkover' idea of Beachcomber. This film is extraordinarily funny, with a story which bears no relation whatever to everyday life. It is a burlesque travesty of school life which provides an admirable vehicle for the fooling of Will Hay. ... The film moves briskly from beginning to end. Production, direction, and acting are alike good, and combine to make this an extremely funny farce."

Kine Weekly wrote: "Will Hay gets going right from the start as Alexander Smart; with his music-hall and wireless experience to guide him he is never at a loss for a laugh. Gordon Harker is immense as the ex-convict, Jimmy Handley is a real chip of the old block as the son, Davy Burnaby is good as the chairman of the board, Claude Dampier is great as the dumb nephew, and Norma Varden amuses as the clinging lady vice-chairman. There is no subtlety about this burlesque, it guys the English public school tradition with hearty gusto and scores all along the line with its swift succession of crazily absurd semi-slapstick situations. Will Hay, the living conception of Beachcomber's famous character, is, of course, the guiding spirit of the fun, but the merry entertainment is by no means a one-man show – good team work and good gags score a full complement of laughs."

Picturegoer wrote: "Originally 'Beachcomber' conceived his imaginary public school Narkover and its headmaster, Dr. Smart-Allick, in a spirit of gentle satire, as a reply to the critics of our public-school system. As a film, however, the story has become a roaring, boisterous, impossible farce, with an abdominal guffaw at every turn. If you shake with laughter, here is your chance to shake."

Writing for The Spectator, Graham Greene characterized the film as "very amusing", describing Hay's portrayal of Dr Smart as "competent" and praising Dampier's portrayal of Second Master Finch as the film's "finest performance".

In The Radio Times Guide to Films David Parkinson gave the film 3/5 stars, writing: "Hay retains the blend of bluster and dishonesty that makes his films irresistible."
