= The Ship That Died of Shame =

1955 British film by Basil Dearden

- Original film poster
- Directed by: Basil Dearden
- Written by: Basil Dearden; Nicholas Monsarrat (short story); Michael Relph; John Whiting
- Produced by: Basil Dearden; Michael Relph
- Starring: Richard Attenborough; George Baker; Bill Owen; Virginia McKenna
- Cinematography: Gordon Dines
- Edited by: Peter Bezencenet
- Music by: William Alwyn
- Production company: Ealing Studios
- Release date: 19 April 1955 (UK)
- Running time: 95 minutes
- Country: United Kingdom
- Language: English

The Ship That Died of Shame, released in the United States as PT Raiders, is a black-and-white 1955 Ealing Studios crime film directed by Basil Dearden and starring Richard Attenborough, George Baker, Bill Owen and Virginia McKenna.

The film is based on a story written by Nicholas Monsarrat (author of The Cruel Sea), which originally appeared in Lilliput magazine in 1952. It was later published in a collection of short stories, The Ship That Died of Shame and other stories, in 1959. After the war, the crew of a gun boat turn their hand to black market smuggling, but their previously reliable craft begins to let them down.

== Plot ==
The 1087 is a British Royal Navy motor gun boat that sees its crew through the worst that World War II can throw at them. After the end of the war, first lieutenant George Hoskins convinces former skipper Bill Randall and coxswain Birdie to buy their boat and use it for what he persuades them is some harmless, minor smuggling of items like wine. But they find themselves transporting ever more sinister cargoes, such as counterfeit currency and weapons. Though their craft had been totally reliable and never let them down in wartime, things start to go wrong after the crew start accepting jobs of a more morally-dubious nature from Major Fordyce, with 1087 breaking down frequently as a result. The crew finally revolt after a passenger is revealed to be child murderer, Raines being helped to escape justice, but on the trip to England he falls or is pushed overboard by Hoskins.

When Fordyce is confronted by customs officer Brewster, Brewster is shot and dies, but not before telling Birdie of the culprit. Fordyce forces the crew at gunpoint to take him to safety. After more engine trouble, Birdie is shot and, in the ensuing scuffle, Randall grabs the gun and kills Fordyce. Randall and Hoskins then fight on the bridge, Hoskins falls overboard as a storm erupts around the boat. 1087 finally shuts down and is smashed to pieces on some rocks, sinking after Randall drags Birdie to safety.

== Cast ==
- Richard Attenborough as Hoskins
- George Baker as Bill
- Bill Owen as Birdie
- Virginia McKenna as Helen
- Roland Culver as Fordyce
- Bernard Lee as the customs officer
- Ralph Truman as Sir Richard
- John Chandos as Raines
- Harold Goodwin as second customs officer
- John Longden as the detective
- All below are uncredited
- Alfie Bass as sailor on board the 1087
- John Boxer as customs man
- Stratford Johns as garage worker
- David Langton as man in Coastal Forces Club bar
- Yana as a woman singer performing "We'll Meet Again" in a room off the bar of the Coastal Forces Club

== Production ==
Despite being produced by Ealing Studios, the film was shot at the film studios at Wembley Park in northwest London. It was the last feature film to be made there.

== Critical reception ==
The New York Times wrote "the little picture ... has a nice strain of sentiment running through it and becomes mildly exciting here and there".

The Monthly Film Bulletin wrote: "As an adventure story, The Ship That Died of Shame could do with greater pace and variety of incident; the material is thinly stretched, and the prologue, with the rather sickly romantic scones between Randall and Helen, has little relevance to the later action. Richard Attenborough is efficiently unlikeable as the slippery and overconfident Hoskins, but George Baker gives a stiff and unrelaxed performance as Randall. The direction, though workmanlike, lacks character; one is scarcely made authentically to feel the men's devotion to the 1087, with the result that the animistic view of the ship seems a sentimental fantasy tacked on to a basically conventional thriller."

Time Out called it "A valuable record of bewildered British masculinity in the post-war years," before dismissing it as "a pretty threadbare thriller"; but TV Guide noted that "With a highly original premise...this movie starts in an exciting fashion and seldom slows down to take on more fuel."

Writing in The Spectator, Virginia Graham said: "The Ship that Died of Shame is an Ealing production and is conducted with that efficiency and regard for the realities which are the hallmark of these studios. Its characterisations, Mr. Attenborough's wide-boy in particular, are defined without exaggeration, and its settings are accurate down to the last wave. ... If the direction, by Messrs. Reiph and Dearden, is not exactly inspired, it leads us smoothly from of glory to disgrace, missing the shoals of the supernatural with considerable adroitness."

Leslie Halliwell reviewed the film as: "Thin and rather obvious melodramatic fable."

The Radio Times Guide to Films gave the film 2/5 stars, writing: "This is one of the more peculiar civvy street pictures made in the decade after the war. It lurches uncomfortably between comedy, social drama and thriller as it follows the fortunes of the washed-up crew of a motor torpedo boat, who recondition the old tub and turn to smuggling because Britain no longer has anything to offer its one-time heroes. Richard Attenborough is the star of the show, but the uncertainty of tone finally gets the better of him."

In British Sound Films: The Studio Years 1928–1959 David Quinlan rated the film as "average", writing: "Fable is well-set but hard to swallow."
