= Trouble Brewing (1939 film) =

- Poster, from UK trade advertisement
- Directed by: Anthony Kimmins
- Written by: Michael Hogan; Angus MacPhail; Anthony Kimmins
- Produced by: Jack Kitchin
- Starring: George Formby; Googie Withers; Gus McNaughton; Garry Marsh
- Cinematography: Ronald Neame
- Edited by: Ernest Aldridge; Eric Williams
- Music by: Ernest Irving
- Production company: Associated Talking Pictures
- Distributed by: Associated British
- Release date: March 1939
- Running time: 87 minutes
- Country: United Kingdom
- Language: English

Trouble Brewing is a 1939 British comedy film directed by Anthony Kimmins and starring George Formby, Googie Withers and Gus McNaughton. It was written by Michael Hogan, Angus MacPhail and Kimmins, based on a novel by Joan Butler.

It was made by Associated Talking Pictures, and includes the songs "Fanlight Fanny" and "Hitting the Highspots Now". The sets were designed by art director Wilfred Shingleton.

== Plot summary ==
George Gullip is a Daily Sun compositor who wins a large sum at the races. He collects three ten-pound notes but, unable to spend them at the bar, exchanges them for six five-pound notes, which turn out to be counterfeit. Gullip is determined to find the criminals and in so doing goes "undercover" as a waiter and a wrestler, before various clues suggest the villain is Gullip's own boss at the newspaper.

== Cast ==
- George Formby as George Gullip
- Googie Withers as Mary Brown
- Gus McNaughton as Bill Pike
- Garry Marsh as A.G. Brady
- C. Denier Warren as Major Hopkins
- Beatrix Fielden-Kaye as housekeeper
- Joss Ambler as Lord Redhill
- Ronald Shiner as Bridgewater
- Martita Hunt as Madame Berdi
- Esma Cannon as maid
- Basil Radford as guest
- Hal Gordon as brewery truck driver
- James Knight as brewery foreman
- Harry Terry as race card seller
- Jack Vyvian as policeman playing cards
- Elsie Wagstaff as Mrs. Hopkins

== Critical reception ==
The Monthly Film Bulletin wrote: "George Formby has done it again, which is probably all that need be said about this joyous farce."

Kine Weekly wrote: "Slapstick comedy and thousands of feet of undiluted laughter-making episodes, and, of course, George with his ukulele and his own inimitable way of putting his songs ove ... boisterous opportunities for side-splitting amusement."

Picturegoer wrote: "It is enjoyable knockabout stuff ... George Formby gives a real piece of comedy characterization as well as singing and playing his uke. Gus McNaughton is good as Bill and Googie Withers makes an attractive and intelligent heroine."

Picture Show wrote: "Gorgeously funny comedy, which is easily the best George Formby has given us. ... Outstanding comedy entertainment."

TV Guide found the film an "enjoyable Formby vehicle".

Sky Movies wrote, "the fun is as fast and furious in this incident-packed George Formby romp as in any film he made...Receipts foamed over at box-offices throughout Britain."

== See also ==
- List of films about horse racing

== Bibliography ==
- Wood, Linda. British Films, 1927-1939. British Film Institute, 1986.
