= Günther Krampf =

Austrian cinematographer

- Born: 8 February 1899; Vienna, Austria-Hungary
- Died: 4 August 1950 (aged 51); London, England
- Occupation: Cinematographer
- Years active: 1920–1950

Günther Krampf (8 February 1899 – 4 August 1950) was an Austrian cinematographer who later settled and worked in the UK. Krampf has been described as a "phantom of film history" because of his largely forgotten role working on a number of important films during the silent and early sound era. Only two of Krampf's films The Student of Prague (1926) and The Ghoul (1933) were expressionist, as he generally used a naturalistic style.

== Germany ==
Krampf first worked as a cinematographer in 1920. During the following decade Krampf worked alongside a number of the leading directors of the Weimar era including F. W. Murnau, Robert Wiene, G. W. Pabst, Richard Oswald and Rudolf Meinert at a time when German films enjoyed a high critical reputation.

== Britain ==
Krampf moved to Britain to work in 1931. Krampf made six films for Gaumont British, a leading studio, between 1932 and 1936. He returned to Germany in 1935 to work on the historical epic Joan of Arc. An agreement Krampf had with an Austrian company to work on Mausi (which was ultimately never made), was broken by the studio because of pressure from Nazi Germany possibly because Krampf might have been of Jewish heritage. Krampf successfully sued in court, and returned to Britain, where he lived for the remainder of his career. After leaving Gaumont, Krampf worked mainly at Welwyn Studios. During the Second World War Krampf collaborated with Alfred Hitchcock on two Propaganda films Aventure malgache and Bon Voyage. His final film of note was Fame is the Spur, a thinly disguised biopic of the politician Ramsay MacDonald, by the Boulting brothers.

== Selected filmography ==
- The Legend of Holy Simplicity (1920)
- The Maharaja's Favourite Wife (1921)
- Nosferatu (1922)
- On the Red Cliff (1922)
- The Lost Shoe (1923)
- One Glass of Water (1923)
- The Hands of Orlac (1924)
- Boarding House Groonen (1925)
- The Girl with a Patron (1925)
- The Adventure of Mr. Philip Collins (1925)
- The Student of Prague (1926)
- Out of the Mist (1927)
- A Murderous Girl (1927)
- The Girl with the Five Zeros (1927)
- Grand Hotel (1927)
- The Prince of Rogues (1928)
- Pandora's Box (1929)
- Masks (1929)
- The Veil Dancer (1929)
- Vendetta (1929)
- The Last Company (1930)
- Alraune (1930)
- Cyanide (1930)
- The Bells (1931)
- The Virtuous Sinner (1931)
- Queen of the Night (1931)
- The Song of the Nations (1931)
- The Outsider (1931)
- The Lucky Number (1932)
- Kuhle Wampe (1932)
- Rome Express (1932)
- The First Mrs. Fraser (1932)
- Sleeping Car (1933)
- The Ghoul (1933)
- Little Stranger (1934)
- Death at Broadcasting House (1934)
- Joan of Arc (1935)
- The Tunnel (1935)
- Everything Is Thunder (1936)
- The Amateur Gentleman (1936)
- His Lordship (1936)
- Paradise for Two (1937)
- Marigold (1938)
- On the Night of the Fire (1939)
- The Outsider (1939)
- Convoy (1940)
- Dead Man's Shoes (1940)
- The Black Sheep of Whitehall (1942)
- The Night Has Eyes (1942)
- Suspected Person (1942)
- Warn That Man (1943)
- Latin Quarter (1945)
- Fame is the Spur (1947)
- This Was a Woman (1948)
- Tinker (1949)
- Portrait of Clare (1950)
- The Franchise Affair (1951)

== Bibliography ==
- Bergfelder, Tim & Cargnelli, Christian. Destination London: German-speaking emigrés and British cinema, 1925-1950. Berghahn Books, 2008.
