= Sailors Three =

- Australian daybill poster
- Directed by: Walter Forde
- Written by: Austin Melford; John Dighton; Angus MacPhail
- Produced by: Michael Balcon
- Starring: Tommy Trinder; Claude Hulbert; Carla Lehmann
- Cinematography: Günther Krampf
- Edited by: Ray Pitt
- Music by: Ernest Irving
- Production company: Ealing Studios
- Distributed by: Associated British
- Release date: 14 December 1940 (UK)
- Running time: 86 minutes
- Country: United Kingdom
- Language: English

Sailors Three (U.S. title: Three Cockeyed Sailors) is a 1940 British war comedy film directed by Walter Forde and starring Tommy Trinder, Claude Hulbert and Carla Lehmann. It was written by Austin Melford, John Dighton and Angus MacPhail.

This was cockney music hall comedian Trinder's debut for Ealing, the studio with which he was to become most closely associated. It concerns three British sailors who accidentally find themselves aboard a German ship during the Second World War.

The song "All Over The Place" (words by Frank Eyton; music by Noel Gay), sung by Trinder in the film, became one of the most popular of the war.

== Plot ==
During the Second World War, three Royal Navy sailors on a drunken spree in a Brazilian neutral port mistake a German ship for their own and climb aboard. It turns out to be a pocket battleship, the Ludendorff, and to the credit of the Royal Navy, the trio manages to capture the ship and all the Germans on board.

== Cast ==
- Tommy Trinder as Tommy Taylor
- Claude Hulbert as Llewellyn Davies, 'The Admiral'
- Carla Lehmann as Jane Davies
- Michael Wilding as Johnny Meadows
- James Hayter as Hans Muller
- Jeanne de Casalis as Mrs Pilkington
- Henry Hewitt as Professor Pilkington
- Brian Fitzpatrick as Digby Pilkington
- John Laurie as McNab
- Harold Warrender as Pilot's mate
- Eric Clavering as bartender
- John Glyn-Jones as best man
- John Wengraf as German Captain
- Manning Whiley as German Commander
- Victor Fairley as German Petty Officer
- Alec Clunes as British pilot
- Derek Elphinstone as British observer
- E. V. H. Emmett as newsreel commentator(uncredited)

== Reception ==
The Monthly Film Bulletin wrote: "From the opening sequences to the very end the pace never flags, and the happenings on the German warship, with its cargo of bananas, have to be seen to be believed. Tommy Trinder, Claude Hulbert and Michael Wilding fling themselves gaily into their parts as the three heroes, Carla Lehmann is a charming heroine, and the rest of the cast-especially Brian FitzPatrick as an impish little boy never let them down. A couple of catchy songs add yet more zest to this joyous mixture, which is guaranteed to chase the worst dose of blues away."

Kine Weekly wrote: "Wartime nautical extravaganza, describing the adventures and misadventures of three sailor pals, who, following a binge, board an enemy battleship in mistake for their own. The fun takes some little time to warm up, but a breezy second half more than compensates for a somewhat labored first. Not only is the balance in the film's favour, it also has resourceful teamwork and star values to clinch its appeal to the crowd. First-rate comedy bet for the masses and the family."

TV Guide called it "a funny comedy from the propagandistic Ealing studios".

In BFI screenonline, John Oliver writes, "Trinder may have made more distinguished films at Ealing, but Sailors Three was not only a promising start at the studio but the film that would remain his most successful outright comedy."
