= Break the News (film) =

1938 British film by René Clair

- Directed by: René Clair
- Written by: Geoffrey Kerr; René Clair
- Based on: novel by Loïc Le Gouriadec
- Produced by: René Clair
- Starring: Jack Buchanan; Maurice Chevalier; June Knight
- Cinematography: Philip Tannura
- Edited by: Frederick Wilson
- Music by: Cole Porter (songs & lyrics); Theo Mackeben (incidental music); Van Phillips (musical direction)
- Production companies: A Jack Buchanan Productions Picture; Trio Productions
- Distributed by: General Film Distributors (Uk)
- Release date: June 1938 (U.K.)
- Running time: 78 minutes
- Country: United Kingdom
- Language: English
- Budget: £163,448

Break the News is a 1938 British musical comedy film directed by René Clair and starring Jack Buchanan, Maurice Chevalier and June Knight. Two struggling performers decide to create a fake murder scandal in order to drum up publicity for their act. It was based on the novel Le mort en fuite by Loïc Le Gouriadec which had previously been made into a 1936 French film Death on the Run. Songs featured include It All Belongs to You (Cole Porter, sung by Chevalier) and We're Old Buddies (Van Phillips, Jack Buchanan, sung by Chevalier and Buchanan).

== Cast ==
- Maurice Chevalier as François Verrier
- Jack Buchanan as Teddy Enton
- June Knight as Grace Gatwick
- Marta Labarr as Sonia
- Gertrude Musgrove as Helena
- Garry Marsh as Producer
- Wallace Douglas as Stage manager
- Joss Ambler as Press agent
- Mark Daly as Property man
- Gibb McLaughlin as Superintendent
- Robb Wilton as cab driver
- Felix Aylmer as Sir George Bickory
- C. Denier Warren as Sir Edward Phring
- George Hayes as Tribunal President
- Guy Middleton as Englishman
- Athole Stewart as Governor
- Charles Lefeaux as Interpreter
- D.J. Williams as Judge
- Elliott Mason as Dresser
- J. Abercomie as Neighbor
- William Fazan as Passport Official
- H.R. Hignett as Prison Guard
- Wally Patch as Prison Guard
- Hal Gordon as Prison Guard
- George Benson as Firing Squad Officer
- Nigel Stock as Stage Boy

== Critical reception ==
Allmovie wrote, "What a combination! Break the News boasted the talents of English stage star Jack Buchanan, French entertainer Maurice Chevalier, legendary director Rene Clair, and songwriter Cole Porter. But what should have made for dynamite entertainment, fizzled in the eyes of disappointed contemporary reviewers"; as The New York Times put it, "there is little to suggest the old Clair wit and humor." However, TV Guide wrote, "the always enchanting Buchanan and Chevalier are a pleasure to watch in this funny, energetic musical that features some hilariously suspenseful sequences. Although it may not rank with director Clair's French classics, this perfect piece of British entertainment holds its own special place."
