= Go to Blazes (1942 film) =

- Directed by: Walter Forde
- Written by: Diana Morgan; Angus MacPhail
- Produced by: Michael Balcon
- Starring: Will Hay; Thora Hird; Muriel George
- Cinematography: Ernest Palmer
- Edited by: Len Page
- Production company: Ealing Studios
- Release date: 1942
- Running time: 9 minutes
- Country: United Kingdom
- Language: English

Go to Blazes is a 1942 British short black and white humorous public information film directed by Walter Forde and starring Will Hay, Thora Hird and Muriel George. It was written by Diana Morgan and Angus MacPhail and produced for the Ministry of Information.

== Plot ==
When an incendiary bomb strikes his house during the Blitz, father fusses so ineptly with his extinguishing equipment that the bomb burns through the floor – and obligingly falls into a bucket of water in the basement. When a second bomb strikes, his daughter shows him how to do the job properly.

== Cast ==
- Will Hay as father
- Thora Hird as Elsie, the daughter
- Muriel George as mother

== Direction credit ==
According the British Film Institute, the identity of the director is uncertain. Although the film's titles credit Walter Forde, he subsequently denied this role. The BFI speculates that direction may have been by Hay or by his occasional directing partner Basil Dearden.

== Reception ==
BFI Screenonline refers to it as a "wittily written information film."
