= The Bailiffs =

1932 film

- Opening titles
- Directed by: T.E.F. Cadman
- Story by: Fred Karno
- Produced by: Clayton Hutton
- Starring: Florence Harwood; Chesney Allen; Bud Flanagan
- Production company: Gaumont-British Picture Corporation
- Release date: 1932
- Running time: 26 minutes
- Country: United Kingdom
- Language: English

The Bailiffs is a 1932 British short comedy film directed by T.E.F. Cadman and starring Flanagan and Allen. The story was by Fred Karno and the film was made by Gaumont-British Picture Corporation at Ealing Studios.

== Plot ==
Flanagan and Allen play two incompetent debt-collectors who mistakenly visit the wrong house to repossess it.

== Cast ==
- Florence Harwood as Miss Templeman
- Chesney Allen as Meredith
- Bud Flanagan as Perkins
- Fred Karno as man in street
- Ian Wilson as butcher's boy
- Reginald Smith as manager
- Joyce Kirby as maid

== Reception ==
Kine Weekly wrote: "Flanagan and Allen, the famous music hall stars, appear in The Bailiffs, in which they portray the tribulations of a brace of 'brokers' men, whose incursion into the wrong house involves them in side-splitting complications. Clayton Hutton produced this amazing short from a story by Fred Karmo."

== Home media ==
The film was included on the DVD The Ealing Studios Rarities Collection – Volume 12 (Network, 2014).
