= Spare a Copper =

1940 film by John Paddy Carstairs

- Advertisement
- Directed by: John Paddy Carstairs
- Written by: Basil Dearden; Roger MacDougall; Austin Melford
- Produced by: Michael Balcon; Basil Dearden
- Starring: George Formby; Dorothy Hyson; Bernard Lee; John Warwick
- Cinematography: Bryan Langley
- Edited by: Ray Pitt
- Music by: Louis Levy
- Production company: Associated Talking Pictures
- Distributed by: ABFD
- Release dates: December 1940 (London); 14 April 1941 (UK general release)
- Running time: 77 minutes
- Country: United Kingdom
- Language: English

Spare a Copper (also known as Call a Cop) is a 1940 British black-and-white musical comedy war film directed by John Paddy Carstairs and starring George Formby, Dorothy Hyson and Bernard Lee. It was written by Basil Dearden, Roger MacDougall and Austin Melford and was produced by Associated Talking Pictures.

The film features the songs "I'm the Ukulele Man", "On the Beat", "I Wish I Was Back on the Farm" and "I'm Shy".

Beryl Reid makes her film debut in an uncredited role, and Ronald Shiner appears similarly uncredited, in the role of the piano mover and tuner.

The film title is a pun, using the colloquial term "copper" meaning a policeman, with the longer phrase "spare a copper" used by beggars – meaning "can you spare a penny" (to give to me).

== Plot ==
The film is set in Merseyside where the battleship HMS Hercules is being built. War Reserve police officer George Carter aspires to become a member of the flying squad. A group of saboteurs are planning to blow it up. George manages to foil them. The saboteurs include fellow police officers who plan to shoot Formby in a remote area but he escapes in a motorised toy car. A crazy chase ensues ending in George going round and round a wall of death before foiling the plot.

== Cast ==
- George Formby as George
- Dorothy Hyson as Jane
- Bernard Lee as Jake
- John Warwick as Shaw
- Warburton Gamble as Sir Robert Dyer
- John Turnbull as Inspector Richards
- George Merritt as Brewster
- Eliot Makeham as Fuller
- Ellen Pollock as Lady Hardstaff
- Edward Lexyas night watchman
- Jack Melford as Dame
- Hal Gordon as Sergeant
- Jimmy Godden as manager
- Grace Arnold as music shop customer
- Charles Carson as Admiral

== Production ==
Working on the film as associate producer and writer, this production was an early assignment for director Basil Dearden: "it was relatively easy to fit the Formby films into the new demands thrown up by the war: whereas George had typically had to overcome rogues and villains in his 1930s films, these were now simply replaced by spies and saboteurs".

== Critical reception ==
The Times critic wrote in 1940: "the structure of Mr. George Formby's films do not alter very much, and the same blue-print that has done serviceable work in the past was taken out of its drawer for Spare a Copper".

In a 1940 issue, Monthly Film Bulletin called it "a good Formby film... With a better story than most".

TV Guide dismissed the film as a "mediocre WW II comedy".

Halliwell's Film Guide comments, "one of the last good Formby comedies, with everything percolating as it should".

George Perry wrote in "Forever Ealing", "the notion of unsuspected German spies in respectable positions was to recur in more serious Ealing films such as The Foreman Went to France and Went the Day Well? These comedy films were judged as very good for public morale at the time while delivering an important message."
