= Who Done It? (1956 film) =

1956 British film by Basil Dearden

- Theatrical release poster
- Directed by: Basil Dearden
- Written by: T. E. B. Clarke
- Based on: story by T.E.B. Clarke
- Produced by: Michael Relph
- Starring: Benny Hill; Belinda Lee; David Kossoff; Garry Marsh; George Margo
- Cinematography: Otto Heller
- Edited by: Peter Tanner
- Music by: Philip Green
- Distributed by: J. Arthur Rank Film Distributors
- Release date: 18 March 1956
- Running time: 85 minutes
- Country: United Kingdom
- Language: English

Who Done It? is a 1956 British slapstick black and white comedy crime film directed by Basil Dearden and starring Benny Hill, Belinda Lee, David Kossoff, Garry Marsh, and George Margo. It was written by T. E. B. Clarke.

One of the last Ealing comedies, it was Hill's film debut.

== Plot ==
Hugo Dill is an ice rink sweeper who accidentally finds himself in the show, causing a cascade of catastrophe.

He dreams of being a private investigator. He goes to a gun-shop to buy a revolver, but his acting as a robber while the shopkeeper is in the back gets him mistaken for a robber and almost arrested.

He hires a room in a casting agency, causing some confusion with his new clients.

He wins a cash prize and a bloodhound in a sleuthing contest and sets up as a private eye.

A group of Soviet spies employ him to impersonate a scientist to trick the world into thinking the scientist is dead (they plan to blow him up). Hugo is helped by his blonde friend Frankie, a female strength act who tags along.

Throughout all, Hugo has continual run-ins with the police. Disguising himself as a woman to further evade the police, Hugo is mistaken for the guest star on the TV programme Your Birthday Wish.

In the final scene the spies steal a Watney's beer lorry (shaped like a barrel) and are pursued by Hugo and Frankie in a car, plus the police chasing all. They end up on a stock car racing circuit which provides an all-action ending.

== Cast ==
- Benny Hill as Hugo Dill
- Belinda Lee as Frankie Mayne
- David Kossoff as Zacco
- Garry Marsh as Detective Inspector Hancock
- George Margo as Barakov
- Ernest Thesiger as Sir Walter
- Denis Shaw as Otto Stumpf
- Frederick Schiller as Gruber
- Jeremy Hawk as himself
- Norah Blaney as actress
- Thorley Walters as Raymond Courtney
- Philip Stainton as Jimmy Maddox
- Warwick Ashton as Police Constable Roberts
- Stratford Johns as Police Constable Coleman
- Nicholas Phipps as scientist
- Peter Bull as scientist
- Gibb McLaughlin as scientist
- Ernest Jay as scientist
- Harold Scott as scientist
- Charles Hawtrey as disc jockey
- Arthur Lowe as demonstrator in store (uncredited)
- Irene Handl as woman in TV shop (uncredited)
- Terence Alexander as radio show official (uncredited)
- Glyn Houston as arresting policeman (uncredited)
- Fabian (the bloodhound, also billed as "Appeline Hector of West Summerland")
- Dagenham Girl Pipers
- The Holiday on Ice Corps De Ballet

== Production ==
It was one of the last films shot at Ealing Studios and also one of the last Ealing movies distributed by Rank. The movie was one of several attempts by Rank to build a new comic star to match the popularity of Norman Wisdom.

The film was announced in January 1955. "Benny Hill really is a good actor," said Dearden, "and unlike some comics... a most co operative chap to work with."

Filming started on 1 September 1955 and took 50 days, of which Hill was required for 47. Writer T.E.B. Clarke spent months studying Hill's technique on TV and the halls and created the script to showcase Hill's ability as a mimic. Basil Dearden said Hill was "an inventive chap, full of suggestions." Hill said "yes and they're so good that he's turned them all down." Belinda Lee was finishing The Feminine Touch (1956) while the shooting began on Who Done It?.

It was one of several comedies Lee made while under contract at Rank.

== Release ==
Who Done It? opened at the New Victoria and Dominion Cinemas in London on 18 March 1956 before entering general release.

== Reception ==
The Monthly Film Bulletin wrote: "Almost every character in the film is meant to be funny, and the result of such forced treatment is a pace that is frantic rather than fast. Inventiveness is forgotten in an attempt to drag in as many comic asides as possible, even the weather-making demonstration being unimaginatively developed. Benny Hill's talent for impersonation is insufficiently exploited, though his brief moments in disguise are his best. Despite an engaging diffidence, his own personality seems rather colourless. The other principals are generally competent, though little use is made of the distinguished supporting cast."

Variety said "There is plenty to please the fans of TV comic Benny Hill in this rollicking slapstick comedy, but the situations and stock ingredients are corny and unlikely to make the grade with more fastidious picturegoers. Pic will cash in with the lower bracket audiences and nabe houses... [Hill] exploits his fatuous personality to the full, while Belinda Lee, as his casually acquired femme friend, lends fleeting glamour to an almost all-male background ... Seasoned players supply convincing support in contrasting roles, and the whole is briskly welded together."

In British Sound Films: The Studio Years 1928–1959 David Quinlan rated the film as "good", writing: "Believable characters help in wildly comic story. Unpolished, but very funny."

Leslie Halliwell said: "Lively but disappointing film debut for a star comic whose screen personality proved too bland."

The Radio Times Guide to Films gave the film 2/5 stars, writing: "Considering he was then one of Britain's most important directors, Basil Dearden might have seemed a peculiar choice for TV comic Benny Hill's sole starring venture. But Dearden adeptly judges the slapstick content of this amiable caper, in which Hill's hapless gumshoe bungles along in pursuit of eastern bloc spies David Kossoff and George Margo. Belinda Lee shows to advantage as Benny's sidekick, but this was all a bit of a come down for T.E.B. Clarke, who had penned some of Ealing's best-known comedies."
