= The Ghost of St. Michael's =

1941 film by Marcel Varnel

- DVD cover
- Directed by: Marcel Varnel
- Written by: John Dighton; Angus MacPhail
- Starring: Will Hay; Claude Hulbert; Charles Hawtrey; John Laurie; Raymond Huntley
- Cinematography: Derek Williams
- Edited by: Edward B. Jarvis
- Distributed by: Ealing Studios
- Release date: April 1941
- Running time: 82 minutes
- Country: United Kingdom
- Language: English

The Ghost of St. Michael's is a 1941 British comedy-thriller film, produced by Ealing Studios.

Will Hay, the film's star, replaced his sidekicks, Graham Moffatt and Moore Marriott, from his previous film Where's That Fire? with comedian Claude Hulbert. Hay and Hulbert would act together again in My Learned Friend two years later.

Typical of comedies made during the war, it has an anti-Nazi plot.

== Plot ==
An ineffectual science teacher William Lamb is hired by a school normally located in middle England (St Michael's) recently transferred because of Second World War evacuation policy to the remote Dunbain Castle on the Isle of Skye, Scotland. Posing as (amongst many other things) an Old Etonian, Lamb settles down into his new surroundings and becomes acquainted with the various local Scottish traditions and legends that abound and strikes up a friendship with one of the other masters, Hilary Tisdaile.

However, shortly after his arrival an ancient curse returns to Dunbain Castle. The sound of bagpipes signals the death of a member of staff. Two die and Lamb is initially regarded as a suspect. With his friend appointed as the new headmaster (and the next potential victim), Lamb must solve the mystery of the mysterious murders with the assistance of mischievous know-all schoolboy Percy Thorne. A Nazi spy ring proves to be behind the killings, and is defeated by a British agent hidden amongst the staff.

In one of the more memorable scenes Lamb is trapped inside a secret room with the ceiling slowly descending upon him. They hide under an iron table but the legs start to bend.

Mrs Wigmore (who has proved to be the traitor) tries to shoot her way to escape but the bullets bounce off the suit of armour which Tisdaile is wearing.

At the very end of the film Hay can be heard breaking character and calling the character Tisdaile "Claude", the actor's real name. This may have been intentional as Hay had just told the cinema audience that it was "all clear" and that they could all go home. Note that Charles Hawtrey was 26 years old when he portrayed Percy Thorne.

== Cast ==
- Will Hay – William Lamb
- Claude Hulbert – Hilary Tisdaile
- Charles Hawtrey – Percy Thorne
- Raymond Huntley – Mr Humphries
- Felix Aylmer – Dr Winter
- Elliott Mason – Mrs Wigmore
- John Laurie – Jamie MacLeod, the headmaster's assistant
- Hay Petrie – Procurator Fiscal
- Roddy Hughes – Amberley
- Derek Blomfield – Sunshine
- Brefni O'Rorke – Sergeant Macfarlane
- Manning Whiley - Stock
- Charles Mortimer - Sir Ambrose
- Clive Baxter - Ritzy
- David Keir - Dr Ritchie
