= The Big Blockade =

1942 British film by Charles Frend

- Theatrical release poster
- Directed by: Charles Frend
- Written by: Charles Frend; Angus MacPhail
- Produced by: Michael Balcon
- Starring: Leslie Banks; Frank Cellier; Will Hay; John Mills; Robert Morley; Michael Redgrave
- Cinematography: Wilkie Cooper; Douglas Slocombe
- Edited by: Compton Bennett; Charles Crichton
- Music by: Richard Addinsell orchestrated by Roy Douglas
- Production company: Ealing Studios
- Distributed by: United Artists Ltd (UK)
- Release date: 19 January 1942 (UK)
- Running time: 73 minutes
- Country: United Kingdom
- Language: English

The Big Blockade is a 1942 British black-and-white dramatised documentary war propaganda film directed by Charles Frend and starring Will Hay, Leslie Banks, Michael Redgrave and John Mills. It was written by Frend and Angus MacPhail, and was produced by Michael Balcon for Ealing Studios, in collaboration with the Ministry of Economic Warfare.

== Synopsis ==
The film illustrates thr British strategy of the economic blockade of Nazi Germany through a series of scenes and sketches, combined with documentary footage.

== Cast ==
- Frank Owen as narrator
- Leslie Banks as Taylor, Civil Service
- Michael Redgrave as a Russian on the train
- Will Hay as Skipper, Merchant Navy
- Bernard Miles as Mate, Royal Navy
- Michael Rennie as George, Royal Air Force
- John Mills as Tom, Royal Air Force
- Frank Cellier as Schneider
- Robert Morley as the senior Nazi Official, von Geiselbrecht
- Alfred Drayton as Direktor
- Marius Goring as German propaganda officer
- Austin Trevor as U-boat Captain
- Morland Graham as civil servant
- Albert Lieven as Gunter
- John Stuart as naval officer
- Joss Ambler as Stoltenhoff
- Michael Wilding as Captain
- George Woodbridge as Quisling
- Quentin Reynolds as American journalist
- Elliott Mason as German stationmistress
- Peter De Greef as RAF airman

== Release ==
The film premiered at the London Pavilion on 19 January 1942, and the premiere was attended by a group of members of Parliament interested in economic warfare.

== Reception ==
The Monthly Film Bulletin wrote: "A sincere and well-constructed propaganda film in dramatic form. The direction and production are effective and the acting in most instances most admirable, especially that of Frank Cellier as Herr Schneider and Will Hay and Bernard Miles as the mate and skipper explaining navicerts. Frank Owen is a masterly commentator who obviously believes whole-heartedly in his subject."

Kine Weekly wrote: "Showmanlike documentary describing in prodigious and spectacular detail the vast, intricate and hazardous workings of the British blockade. The slow but sure stranglehold on Germany is depicted with authenticity. There are a number of impressive guest artistes ... There is no story in the real sense, but rather a straightforward, illuminating and spectacular statement of exciting facts."

The Daily Film Renter wrote: "Britain's blockade of Germany told in striking documentary, commentary and acted scenes. Strong patriotic and propagandist note enhanced by introduction of names-in-the-news personalities. Neat interludes of forthright humour leavening thrills and impact of sea and air warfare. Big scale canvas results in occasional obscurity of theme and repetition of argument. Lively acting. Imaginative direction. Powerful semi-documentary, with obvious additional asset of important star names, which should make widespread appeal to popular audiences."

Variety wrote: "There is an absorbingly interesting plot, based on the almost forgotten fact by the man in the street that Britain applied blockade methods some time before she was at war with Germany by putting into operation the system of navicerts whereby she restricted the importation of all sorts of essentials to the Nazi war preparations, interfering with contraband, etc. Story starts with the observation that the British navy could not, at that time, destroy what Germany already possessed in supplies, but had in operation a navy at work preventing further imports. ... Inclusion of comedy, not to mention intensive drama, also enhances the film's potenticlities."

The Times wrote: "this particular hotch-potch is, as propaganda, woefully unconvincing. It is splendid to give audiences a glimpse of the devoted work done by the Services […] but actors got up as comic Nazi business men distort the lessons the more serious parts of the film are trying to drive home"
