= My Learned Friend =

- Directed by: Basil Dearden; Will Hay
- Written by: John Dighton; Angus MacPhail
- Produced by: Michael Balcon; Robert Hamer
- Starring: Will Hay; Claude Hulbert; Mervyn Johns
- Cinematography: Wilkie Cooper
- Edited by: Charles Hasse
- Music by: Ernest Irving
- Production company: Ealing Studios
- Distributed by: Ealing
- Release date: 1943
- Running time: 74 minutes
- Country: United Kingdom
- Language: English

My Learned Friend is a 1943 British black-and-white comedy film directed by Basil Dearden and Will Hay and starring Hay, Claude Hulbert and Mervyn Johns. It was written by John Dighton and Angus MacPhail and produced by Michael Balcon, Robert Hamer for Ealing Studios.

The film's title refers to a tradition in British law: when addressing either the court or the judge, a barrister refers to the opposing counsel using the respectful term, "my learned friend".

This was Hay's last film.

== Plot ==
William Fitch is a seedy lawyer who finds himself marked for assassination by a forger whom he previously defended unsuccessfully. He teams up with an incompetent solicitor to try to prevent the deaths of others involved. The film climaxes with a sequence where Fitch hangs from the hands of the clock face of Big Ben in an attempt to prevent a time bomb being detonated.

== Cast ==
- Will Hay as William Fitch
- Claude Hulbert as Claude Babbington
- Mervyn Johns as Arthur Grimshaw
- Lawrence Hanray as Sir Norman
- Aubrey Mallalieu as magistrate
- Charles Victor as "Safety" Wilson
- Derna Hazell as Gloria
- Leslie Harcourt as barman
- Eddie Phillips as Charles Edward "Basher" Blake
- G.H. Mulcaster as Dr Scudamore
- Ernest Thesiger as Ferris
- Lloyd Pearson as Colonel Cudleigh
- Gibb McLaughlin as Carstairs, the butler
- Maudie Edwards as Ethel "Aladdin" Redfern
- Ronald Shiner as man at Wilson's café [uncredited]
- Ian Wilson as stagehand [uncredited]
- Hy Hazell [uncredited]

== Reception ==
The Monthly Film Bulletin wrote: "Angus MacPhail and John Dighton have written a wealth of craziness into this screen play which emerges as a farce in the best and most violent tradition. ... Hay and Hulbert rush through their parts in rollicking irresponsibility which infects the whole cast."

Kine Weekly wrote: "The story visits a low dive In the East End, a theatre stage during the presentation of a pantomime, a lunatic asylum, the vaults of the House of Lords and the clock tower and face of Big Ben, yet, strangely enough, the majority of its laughs are promoted by cross talk rather than by action. Still, laughs there are and they are so rare these sombre days that they are very welcome. Anyway, the riotous slapstick climax does much to adjust box-office balance. Star and title values will do the rest."

Picturegoer wrote: "It this has not all the sparkle one expects from a Will Hay picture it is because the actor was a very sick man when he was making it."

Variety wrote: "Picture is slickly directed, never drags, and has a plausible excuse for many comic and improbable incidents. ... All the characters (practically all male) are perfect types, from the East End thugs to the tawdry personnel of a cheap provincial pantomime company. Mervyn Johns scores particularly in the role of the crafty maniac-crook. In the comedy field, excellent of its kind and no reason it shouldn't provide a novelty support in a dual program in the U.S."
