= Ealing Studios =

Television and film production company

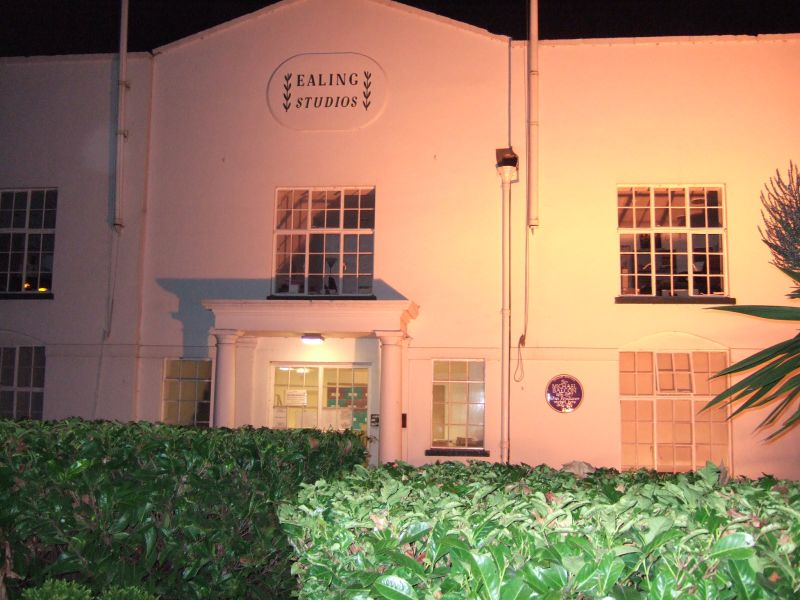
- Ealing Studios
- Industry: Film, television production
- Headquarters: London, England
- Products: Film, television
- Website: ealingstudios.com

Ealing Studios is a television and film production company and facilities provider at Ealing Green in West London, England. Will Barker bought the White Lodge on Ealing Green in 1902 as a base for filmmaking, and films have been made on the site ever since. It is the oldest continuously working studio facility for film production in the world, and the current stages were opened for the use of sound in 1931.

It is best known for a series of classic films produced in the post-World War II years, including Saraband for Dead Lovers (1948), Kind Hearts and Coronets (1949), Passport to Pimlico (1949), The Lavender Hill Mob (1951), and The Ladykillers (1955). The BBC owned and filmed at the Studios for forty years from 1955 until 1995.

Since 2000, Ealing Studios has resumed releasing films under its own name, including the revived St Trinian's franchise. In more recent times, films shot there include The Importance of Being Earnest (2002) and Shaun of the Dead (2004), as well as The Theory of Everything (2014), The Imitation Game (2014), Burnt (2015) and Devs (2020). Interior scenes of the British period drama television series Downton Abbey were shot in Stage 2 of the studios. The Met Film School London operates on the site.

== History ==
=== Film studios (1902–1955) ===
The site was first occupied by Will Barker Studios from 1902. From 1929, it was acquired by theatre producer Basil Dean, who founded Associated Talking Pictures Ltd. He was joined on the management level by Stephen Courtauld and Reginald Baker. In 1931, they built Ealing Studios, transferring all production there in December of that year. When Dean left in 1938 to be replaced by Michael Balcon from MGM, about 60 films had been made at the studios. Balcon discontinued the ATP name and began to issue films under the Ealing Studios name. In 1944, the company was taken over by the Rank Organisation.

In the 1930s and 1940s, the facility as ATP and then Ealing Studios produced many comedies with stars such as Gracie Fields, George Formby, Stanley Holloway and Will Hay, who had established their reputations in other spheres of entertainment. The company was also instrumental in the use of documentary film-makers to make more realistic war films. These included Went the Day Well? (1942), The Foreman Went to France (1942), Undercover (1943), and San Demetrio London (1943). In 1945, the studio made its chiller compendium Dead of Night.

In the post-war period, the company embarked on a series of comedies which became the studio's hallmark. These were often lightly satirical and were seen to reflect aspects of British character and society. The first was Hue and Cry (1947) and the last Barnacle Bill (1956).

The best remembered Ealing films were produced between 1948 and 1955: Whisky Galore! (1949), Passport to Pimlico (1949), Kind Hearts and Coronets (1949), The Lavender Hill Mob (1951), The Man in the White Suit (1951), The Titfield Thunderbolt (1953), The Cruel Sea (1953) and The Ladykillers (1955) are all regarded as classics of British cinema.

=== Owned by the BBC (1955–1993) ===
The BBC bought the studios on Ealing Green in 1955, for £300,000, though productions bearing the Ealing name continued to be made at the MGM British Studios at Borehamwood for two years.

Balcon later said of the MGM-Ealing partnership "Personally it was a happy relationship. But I do wish I had realised at the outset how absolutely vital it is to make films with mass appeal in America – by which I don't mean lowering standards but rather finding the right subjects."

In 1958, Associated British Picture Corporation acquired Ealing's parent company, Associated Talking Pictures, together with its extensive film library. The BBC based its Film Department at the studios; and at its peak 56 film crews used the studios as a base for location filming of dramas, documentaries and other programmes; shot on 16 mm and occasionally 35 mm film. Led by a director, these crews usually consisted of a Lighting Cameraman, a camera assistant, a lighting technician (known as a 'spark'), and a sound recordist. Initially these crews were equipped with Arriflex ST cameras and EMI L2 quarter inch tape recorders that had to be tethered to one another with a physical sync cable to ensure the picture and sound ran in lock. In later years, Eclair NPR cameras replaced the Arriflex machines and Nagra tape recorders replaced the EMI units. The Nagras made use of 'crystal sync', a system that provided synchronisation between the camera and the tape recorder remotely, removing the need for a physical cable. There were also over 50 cutting rooms, equipped with Steenbeck editing tables, working on every genre except News and Current Affairs. The editing suites came complete with movable film trim bins and Acmade Pic-Syncs (picture synchronisers) for synchronising the film and sound rushes, and working with the edited cutting copy. The latter was especially useful when splitting the sound track(s) and adding additional effects, atmospheres, music and commentary tracks in readiness for film dubbing.

Many programmes came out of Ealing from Alistair Cooke's America edited by Alan Tyrer and photographed by Kenneth MacMillan to inserts for the drama series Z-Cars edited by Shelia Tomlinson and many others and most of the drama Cathy Come Home edited by Roy Watts, assisted by Roger Waugh. These programmes had post production support, viewing theatres, transfer suites, dubbing theatre, maintenance.

It was not unknown for major international film stars to visit the studios during BBC Television days. Shortly after The Eagle Has Landed (1976) was released in London on 31 March 1977, Michael Caine was present at the studios during his promotional tour for the film. Apart from the regular production staff and technicians involved with filming the associated interview, at his table in the studio canteen he was surrounded by a large entourage of followers during the obligatory break period.

In the 1980s, the BBC developed and expanded the use of electronic PSC (Portable Single Camera) location equipment and the use of 16 mm film on location gradually declined. The BBC also used the studio facilities at Ealing for filmed inserts where an electronic studio could not be used, such as for the excavation site in Quatermass and the Pit (1958–59), The White Rabbit (TV mini-series, 1967), Colditz (1972–74) and the communal sequences in Porridge (1974–77). Programmes wholly shot on film were made there also, such as Alice in Wonderland (1966), The Singing Detective (1986), Portrait of a Marriage (1986), and Fortunes of War (1987).

The BBC had preview theatres to run 16 mm sepmag film and 35 mm. The 16 mm machines were Bauer and the 35 mm projectors Kalee 21. The projection area was a long room (open plan) with projectors serving theatres E -J. There was a separate projection room in the same area for theatre K, which was 35 mm. There was also a dubbing theatre B, where 16 mm productions would be dubbed, and film dispatch and sound transfer suites, where the quarter-inch tape from Nagra tape machines would be transferred to 16 mm magnetic film. Film previews ran rushes, cutting copies, synch rushes, answer prints and transmission prints before going to telecine.

Television Film Studios was also the home before, during and after 1977, of the BBC TV Film Technical & Training Section run by the Senior Assistant, Training, Frank A. Brown. Courses were based in a lecture room at the studios, typically lasting 6 weeks, and comprised both theoretical training, with extensive information-sheet documentation being provided, plus day excursions for practical experience sessions to film cutting rooms, a film dubbing theatre and the Rank Film Laboratories at Denham (where a considerable quantity of BBC TV film programme content was processed and printed). The courses provided instruction to trainees, culminating in a written theory test, with each either being tailored to film photography, film sound or film editing skills for incoming trainees in these departments. The BBC Engineering Training Department, for training in video work and all aspects where a detailed knowledge of electronics is essential, has, alternatively, been based at Wood Norton Hall, Evesham.

=== Owned by BBRK (1993–1994) ===
With the BBC seeking to reduce costs and in particular studio facilities, a decision was taken to sell Ealing Studios on the open market. In 1993, a sale, for 6 million pounds, was agreed with BBRK Group Limited, a group of special effects businesses, chaired by David Malcolm Bill, a former advertising art director.

=== 1994 to present ===
The BBC had inserted a buy-back clause so that, in the event that BBRK put the site up for sale, the BBC would have first option to purchase. In 1992, BBRK acquired the studios and, in 1994, the National Film and Television School then bought them.

In mid-2000, the studios were sold again to a consortium led by Fragile Films' Uri Fruchtmann and Barnaby Thompson, Harry Handelsman and John Kao, with an intention to revive the fortunes of the studio. Handelsman's Manhattan Loft Corporation redeveloped the 3.8-acre site to include the existing Grade II listed sound stages. The studio has since begun to produce theatrical films again, such as Lucky Break (2001), The Importance of Being Earnest (2002), and Valiant (2005). Shaun of the Dead and horror film The Descent (2005) were both shot on the lot.

In 2007, Ealing revived the St Trinian's franchise followed by a sequel St. Trinian's, The Legend of Fritton's Gold released in December 2009. Between these, Ealing released Easy Virtue (2008), directed by Stephan Elliott and Dorian Gray (2009), directed by Oliver Parker.

Ealing Studios is used by the Met Film School London, which has a purpose-built film school on the lot and use of the studios. ITV drama Downton Abbey filmed the kitchen and servants' quarters on stages 3A and 3B. The studio is also home to The Imaginarium, a production company and studio specializing in performance-capture, founded by Andy Serkis and Jonathan Cavendish.

== Ealing Studios films ==
=== Basil Dean/ATP era ===
- Birds of Prey (1930)
- A Honeymoon Adventure (1931)
- Sally in Our Alley (1931)
- Looking on the Bright Side (1932)
- Nine till Six (1932)
- The Bailiffs (1932)
- The Impassive Footman (1932)
- The Sign of Four (1932)
- The Water Gipsies (1932)
- The Right to Live (1933)
- Loyalties (1933)
- Perfect Understanding (1933)
- The Fortunate Fool (1933)
- The House of Trent (1933)
- This Week of Grace (1933)
- Three Men in a Boat (1933)
- Tiger Bay (1933)
- To Brighton with Gladys (1933)
- Autumn Crocus (1934)
- Love, Life and Laughter (1934)
- Rolling in Money (1934)
- Sing As We Go (1934)
- Love on the Spot (1934)
- The Perfect Flaw (1934)
- The Secret of the Loch (1934)
- Honeymoon for Three (1935)
- It Happened in Paris (1935)
- Look Up and Laugh (1935)
- Lorna Doone (1935)
- Midshipman Easy (1935)
- No Limit (1935)
- Play Up the Band (1935)
- The Dictator (1935)
- The Public Life of Henry the Ninth (1935)
- The Silent Passenger (1935)
- A Woman Alone (1936)
- Calling the Tune (1936)
- Cheer Up (1936)
- Dreams Come True (1936)
- Guilty Melody (1936)
- Keep Your Seats, Please (1936)
- Laburnum Grove (1936)
- Queen of Hearts (1936)
- The House of the Spaniard (1936)
- Lonely Road (1936)
- Tropical Trouble (1936)
- Whom the Gods Love (1936)
- Brief Ecstasy (1937)
- Feather Your Nest (1937)
- Keep Fit (1937)
- Secret Lives (1937)
- Take a Chance (1937)
- The Girl in the Taxi (1937)
- The High Command (1937)
- The Show Goes On (1937)
- Who's Your Lady Friend? (1937)
- I See Ice (1938)
- It's in the Air (1938)
- Penny Paradise (1938)

=== Michael Balcon era ===
- The Gaunt Stranger (1938)
- The Ware Case (1938)
- Let's Be Famous (1939)
- Trouble Brewing (1939)
- The Four Just Men (1939)
- There Ain't No Justice (1939)
- Young Man's Fancy (1939)
- Cheer Boys Cheer (1939)
- Come On George! (1939)
- Olympic Honeymoon (1940)
- Return to Yesterday (1940)
- The Proud Valley (1940)
- Let George Do It! (1940)
- Convoy (1940)
- Saloon Bar (1940)
- Sailors Three (1940)
- Spare a Copper (1940)
- The Ghost of St. Michael's (1941)
- Turned Out Nice Again (1941)
- Ships with Wings (1941)
- The Black Sheep of Whitehall (1942)
- The Big Blockade (1942)
- The Foreman Went to France (1942)
- The Next of Kin (1942)
- The Goose Steps Out (1942)
- Went the Day Well? (1942)
- Nine Men (1943)
- The Bells Go Down (1943)
- Undercover (1943)
- My Learned Friend (1943)
- San Demetrio London (1943)
- The Halfway House (1944)
- For Those in Peril (1944)
- They Came to a City (1944)
- Champagne Charlie (1944)
- Fiddlers Three (1944)
- Johnny Frenchman (1945)
- Painted Boats (1945)
- Dead of Night (1945)
- Pink String and Sealing Wax (1945)
- The Captive Heart (1946)
- The Overlanders (1946) – produced by Ealing but filmed in Australia
- Hue and Cry (1947) – the first of the "Ealing Comedies"
- Nicholas Nickleby (1947)
- The Loves of Joanna Godden (1947)
- Frieda (1947)
- It Always Rains on Sunday (1947)
- Against the Wind (1948)
- Saraband for Dead Lovers (1948) – Ealing's first Technicolor film
- Another Shore (1948)
- Scott of the Antarctic (1948)
- Eureka Stockade (1949)
- Passport to Pimlico (1949)
- Whisky Galore! (1949)
- Kind Hearts and Coronets (1949)
- Train of Events (1949)
- A Run for Your Money (1949)
- The Blue Lamp (1950)
- Dance Hall (1950)
- Bitter Springs (1950)
- Cage of Gold (1950)
- The Magnet (1950)
- Pool of London (1951)
- The Lavender Hill Mob (1951)
- The Man in the White Suit (1951)
- Where No Vultures Fly (1951)
- His Excellency (1952)
- The Secret People (1952)
- I Believe in You (1952)
- Mandy (1952)
- The Gentle Gunman (1952)
- The Titfield Thunderbolt (1953)
- The Cruel Sea (1953)
- The Square Ring (1953)
- Meet Mr. Lucifer (1953)
- The Love Lottery (1954)
- The Maggie (1954)
- West of Zanzibar (1954)
- The Rainbow Jacket (1954)
- Lease of Life (1954)
- The Divided Heart (1954)
- Out of the Clouds (1955)
- The Night My Number Came Up (1955)
- The Ship That Died of Shame (1955)
- Touch and Go (1955)
- The Ladykillers (1955)
- The Feminine Touch (1956)
- Who Done It? (1956)
- The Long Arm (1956)
- The Man in the Sky (1957) – with MGM
- The Shiralee (1957) – with MGM
- Barnacle Bill (1957) – with MGM
- Davy (1957) – with MGM
- Dunkirk (1958) – with MGM
- Nowhere to Go (1958) – with MGM
- The Siege of Pinchgut (1959) – with Associated British Picture Corporation

== Documentaries ==
- All Hands (1940)
- Dangerous Comment (1940)
- Food for Thought (1940)
- Now You're Talking (1940)
- Salvage with a Smile (1940)
- Sea Fort (1940)
- Guest of Honour (1941)
- Yellow Caesar (1941)
- Young Veterans (1941)
- Find, Fix and Strike (1942)
- Go to Blazes (1942)
- Raid on France (1942) – adapted from The Next of Kin
- Greek Testament (1943)
- Return of the Vikings (1944)
- Man – One Family (1946)

== BBC TV productions ==
- The Diary of Samuel Pepys (1958) (Outdoor sequences of the City of London)
- Quatermass and the Pit (1958–59) (inserts only; programme was otherwise live)
- Doctor Who (inserts only; programme was predominantly videotaped)
- Alice in Wonderland (1966) (inserts only – stage 2 for courtroom scene)
- Civilisation (1966–69) (35mm film, shot on location around the world)
- The White Rabbit (1967) (inserts only; programme was predominantly videotaped)
- Colditz (1972–74) (16mm film inserts only; programme was predominantly videotaped)
- Porridge (TV series) (1974–77) (16mm film inserts only; programme was predominantly videotaped)
- Oil Strike North (1975) (16mm film inserts only – stage 3A/B for oil rig exterior, using tank; programme was predominantly videotaped)
- Smiley's People (1981) (16mm film, shot at various locations)
- Bleak House (1985) (16mm film, shot at various locations)
- The Singing Detective (1986) (16mm film, shot at various locations)
- Fortunes of War (1987) (16mm film, interior scenes – otherwise shot at various locations)
- Portrait of a Marriage (1989–90) (16mm film, shot at various locations)
- An Ungentlemanly Act (1992) (16mm film, shot at various locations)

== Later films ==
- Notting Hill (1999)
- Lucky Break (2001)
- The Importance of Being Earnest (2002)
- Shaun of the Dead (2004)
- Valiant (2005)
- I Want Candy (2007)
- St Trinian's (2007)
- Easy Virtue (2008)
- St Trinian's 2: The Legend of Fritton's Gold (2009)
- Dorian Gray (2009)
- Burke and Hare (2010)
- I Give It a Year (2013)
- The D Train (2015)
- The Guernsey Literary and Potato Peel Pie Society (2018)
- Last Night in Soho (2021)

== Independent TV ==
- The Royle Family (Granada Productions for the BBC)
- Bedtime (Hat Trick Productions)
- Randall and Hopkirk (Ghost)
- Emma Brody (20th Century Fox)
- Downton Abbey – "Downstairs" scenes only (Carnival Films)
- Taboo
- Tour de France ITV4 (2012–2019 VSquared Productions)
- Critérium du Dauphiné ITV4 (2015–2019 VSquared Productions)
- La Vuelta ITV4 (2012–2019 VSquared Productions)
- Luck on Sunday (2017–present, Racing TV)
- Lockwood & Co. (2023-2023, Netflix)

== Music videos ==
- "Mama" by Spice Girls
- "Walk Away" by Franz Ferdinand
- "Talk" by Coldplay
- "The Drowners" by Suede (US video only)
- "Crazy Beat" by Blur
- "The Moment You Believe" by Melanie C
- "Champagne Supernova" by Oasis

== See also ==
- List of Ealing Studios films
- British Film Industry
