= BAFTA Award for Best British Screenplay =

British film industry award

- Awarded for: Best British Screenplay
- Location: United Kingdom
- Presented by: British Academy of Film and Television Arts
- First award: 1954 (presented 1955)
- Final award: 1967 (presented 1968)
- Website: http://www.bafta.org/

The BAFTA Award for Best British Screenplay was a British Academy Film Award from 1954 to 1967. The British Academy of Film and Television Arts (BAFTA) is a British organisation that hosts annual awards shows for film, television, children's film and television, and interactive media.

In the following lists, the titles and names in bold with a gold background are the winners and recipients respectively; those not in bold are the nominees. The years given are those in which the films under consideration were released, not the year of the ceremony, which always takes place the following year.

Since the death of Bryan Forbes in 2013, Frederic Raphael is the only surviving receipt of the award.

== Winners and nominees ==
indicates the winner

=== 1950s ===
Year	Film	Screenwriter(s)
**1954** (8th)	**The Young Lovers**	**George Tabori and Robin Estridge**
**1954** (8th)	The Divided Heart	Jack Whittingham
**1954** (8th)	Doctor in the House	Nicholas Phipps
**1954** (8th)	Hobson's Choice	David Lean, Norman Spencer and Wynyard Browne
**1954** (8th)	The Maggie	William Rose
**1954** (8th)	Monsieur Ripois	Hugh Mills and René Clément
**1954** (8th)	The Purple Plain	Eric Ambler
**1954** (8th)	Romeo and Juliet	Renato Castellani
**1955** (9th)	**The Ladykillers**	**William Rose**
**1955** (9th)	The Constant Husband	Sidney Gilliat and Val Valentine
**1955** (9th)	The Dam Busters	R. C. Sherriff
**1955** (9th)	The Deep Blue Sea	Terence Rattigan
**1955** (9th)	Doctor at Sea	Nicholas Phipps and Jack Davies
**1955** (9th)	The Night My Number Came Up	R. C. Sherriff
**1955** (9th)	The Prisoner	Bridget Boland
**1955** (9th)	Touch and Go	William Rose
**1956** (10th)	**The Man Who Never Was**	**Nigel Balchin**
**1956** (10th)	The Battle of the River Plate	Michael Powell and Emeric Pressburger
**1956** (10th)	The Green Man	Sidney Gilliat and Frank Launder
**1956** (10th)	Private's Progress	Frank Harvey and John Boulting
**1956** (10th)	Reach for the Sky	Lewis Gilbert
**1956** (10th)	Smiley	Moore Raymond and Anthony Kimmins
**1956** (10th)	Three Men in a Boat	Hubert Gregg and Vernon Harris
**1956** (10th)	A Town Like Alice	W. P. Lipscomb and Richard Mason
**1956** (10th)	Yield to the Night	John Cresswell and Joan Henry
**1957** (11th)	**The Bridge on the River Kwai**	**Pierre Boulle**
**1957** (11th)	Anastasia	Arthur Laurents
**1957** (11th)	The Birthday Present	Jack Whittingham
**1957** (11th)	Hell Drivers	John Kruse and Cy Endfield
**1957** (11th)	The Man in the Sky	William Rose and John Eldridge
**1957** (11th)	The Prince and the Showgirl	Terence Rattigan
**1957** (11th)	The Smallest Show on Earth	William Rose and John Eldridge
**1957** (11th)	The Story of Esther Costello	Charles Kaufman
**1957** (11th)	Windom's Way	Jill Craigie
**1957** (11th)	Woman in a Dressing Gown	Ted Willis
**1958** (12th)	**Orders to Kill**	**Paul Dehn**
**1958** (12th)	Bonjour Tristesse	Arthur Laurents
**1958** (12th)	A Cry from the Streets	Vernon Harris
**1958** (12th)	Ice Cold in Alex	T. J. Morrison
**1958** (12th)	Indiscreet	Norman Krasna
**1958** (12th)	The Inn of the Sixth Happiness	Isobel Lennart
**1958** (12th)	The Key	Carl Foreman
**1958** (12th)	The Man Upstairs	Alun Falconer
**1958** (12th)	A Night To Remember	Eric Ambler
**1958** (12th)	Violent Playground	James Kennaway
**1959** (13th)	**I'm All Right Jack**	**Frank Harvey, John Boulting and Alan Hackney**
**1959** (13th)	Blind Date	Ben Barzman and Millard Lampell
**1959** (13th)	Expresso Bongo	Wolf Mankowitz
**1959** (13th)	The Horse's Mouth	Alec Guinness
**1959** (13th)	Look Back in Anger	Nigel Kneale
**1959** (13th)	No Trees in the Street	Ted Willis
**1959** (13th)	North West Frontier	Robin Estridge
**1959** (13th)	Sapphire	Janet Green
**1959** (13th)	Tiger Bay	John Hawkesworth and Shelley Smith

=== 1960s ===
Year	Film	Screenwriter(s)
**1960** (14th)	**The Angry Silence**	**Bryan Forbes**
**1960** (14th)	The Day They Robbed the Bank of England	Howard Clewes
**1960** (14th)	The Entertainer	John Osborne and Nigel Kneale
**1960** (14th)	Hell Is a City	Val Guest
**1960** (14th)	The League of Gentlemen	Bryan Forbes
**1960** (14th)	The Millionairess	Wolf Mankowitz
**1960** (14th)	Saturday Night and Sunday Morning	Alan Sillitoe
**1960** (14th)	A Touch of Larceny	Roger MacDougall, Guy Hamilton and Ivan Foxwell
**1960** (14th)	The Trials of Oscar Wilde	Ken Hughes
**1960** (14th)	Tunes of Glory	James Kennaway
**1961** (15th)	**The Day the Earth Caught Fire** (TIE)	**Wolf Mankowitz and Val Guest**
**1961** (15th)	**A Taste of Honey** (TIE)	**Shelagh Delaney and Tony Richardson**
**1961** (15th)	Flame in the Streets	Ted Willis
**1961** (15th)	The Guns of Navarone	Carl Foreman
**1961** (15th)	Victim	Janet Green and John McCormick
**1961** (15th)	Whistle Down the Wind	Keith Waterhouse and Willis Hall
**1962** (16th)	**Lawrence of Arabia**	**Robert Bolt**
**1962** (16th)	Billy Budd	Peter Ustinov and DeWitt Bodeen
**1962** (16th)	A Kind of Loving	Willis Hall and Keith Waterhouse
**1962** (16th)	Only Two Can Play	Bryan Forbes
**1962** (16th)	Tiara Tahiti	Geoffrey Cotterell and Ivan Foxwell
**1962** (16th)	Waltz of the Toreadors	Wolf Mankowitz
**1963** (17th)	**Tom Jones**	**John Osborne**
**1963** (17th)	Billy Liar	Keith Waterhouse and Willis Hall
**1963** (17th)	The Servant	Harold Pinter
**1963** (17th)	This Sporting Life	David Storey
**1964** (18th)	**The Pumpkin Eater**	**Harold Pinter**
**1964** (18th)	Becket	Edward Anhalt
**1964** (18th)	Dr. Strangelove or: How I Learned to Stop Worrying and Love the Bomb	Stanley Kubrick, Peter George and Terry Southern
**1964** (18th)	Séance on a Wet Afternoon	Bryan Forbes
**1965** (19th)	**Darling**	**Frederic Raphael**
**1965** (19th)	The Hill	Ray Rigby
**1965** (19th)	The Ipcress File	Bill Canaway and James Doran
**1965** (19th)	The Knack ...and How to Get It	Charles Wood
**1966** (20th)	**Morgan!**	**David Mercer**
**1966** (20th)	Alfie	Bill Naughton
**1966** (20th)	It Happened Here	Kevin Brownlow and Andrew Mollo
**1966** (20th)	The Quiller Memorandum	Harold Pinter
**1967** (21st)	**A Man for All Seasons**	**Robert Bolt**
**1967** (21st)	Accident	Harold Pinter
**1967** (21st)	The Deadly Affair	Paul Dehn
**1967** (21st)	Two for the Road	Frederic Raphael

== Multiple wins and nominations ==
=== Multiple wins ===
Wins	Screenwriter
2	Robert Bolt

=== Multiple nominations ===
Nominations	Screenwriter
5	William Rose
4	Bryan Forbes
4	Wolf Mankowitz
4	Harold Pinter
3	Willis Hall
3	Keith Waterhouse
3	Ted Willis
2	Eric Ambler
2	Robert Bolt
2	John Boulting
2	Paul Dehn
2	John Eldridge
2	Robin Estridge
2	Carl Foreman
2	Ivan Foxwell
2	Sidney Gilliat
2	Janet Green
2	Val Guest
2	Vernon Harris
2	Frank Harvey
2	James Kennaway
2	Nigel Kneale
2	Arthur Laurents
2	John Osborne
2	Nicholas Phipps
2	Frederic Raphael
2	Terence Rattigan
2	R. C. Sherriff
2	Jack Whittingham
