= Douglas Slocombe =

English cinematographer (1913–2016)

Douglas Slocombe OBE
- Born: Ralph Douglas Vladimir Slocombe; 10 February 1913; London, England
- Died: 22 February 2016 (aged 103); London, England
- Occupation: Cinematographer
- Years active: 1940–1989
- Awards: See below

Ralph Douglas Vladimir Slocombe, OBE (10 February 1913 – 22 February 2016) was an English cinematographer. He was particularly known for his work at Ealing Studios in the 1940s and 1950s, and the first three Indiana Jones films. He won three BAFTA Awards for Best Cinematography – The Servant (1963), The Great Gatsby (1974), and Julia (1977) – and was nominated for the equivalent Academy Award on three occasions.

Slocombe received Lifetime Achievement Awards from both the British and American Society of Cinematographers. In 2008, he was ascended an Officer of the Order of the British Empire (OBE) at the 2008 New Year Honours for his contributions to motion pictures.

== Early life ==
Slocombe was born in Putney, London, the son of Marie (née Karlinsky) and journalist George Slocombe (1894–1963). His mother was Russian. His father was the Paris correspondent for the Daily Herald, and so Slocombe spent part of his upbringing in France, returning to the United Kingdom around 1933. He graduated with a degree in Mathematics from the Sorbonne.

Slocombe initially intended to become a photojournalist, and as a young photographer, he witnessed the early events leading up to the outbreak of World War II. Visiting Danzig in 1939, he photographed the growing anti-Jewish sentiment. In consequence, he was commissioned by American film-maker Herbert Kline to film events for a documentary called Lights Out, covering a Goebbels rally and the burning of a synagogue, for which he was briefly arrested. Slocombe was in Warsaw with a movie camera on 1 September 1939 when Germany invaded. Accompanied by Kline, he escaped, but his train was machine-gunned by a German aeroplane. In 2014, he said of the experience that:

I had no understanding of the concept of blitzkrieg. I had been expecting trouble but I thought it would be in trenches, like WW1. The Germans were coming over the border at a great pace ... We were trundling through the countryside at night. We kept stopping for no apparent reason, but we came to a screeching halt because a German plane was bombing us. After its first pass we climbed out the window and crawled under the carriage. The plane came back and started machine-gunning. A young girl died in front of us.

After escaping from the train, Slocombe and Kline bought a horse and cart from a Polish farm, finally returning to London via Latvia and Stockholm. He was also in the Netherlands when the Germans invaded in May 1940 but managed to get on the last British boat out of Holland to be evacuated as the Dutch surrendered. The true story of the evacuation is told in the book 'Escape From Holland' by Chris Hunt.

== Work ==
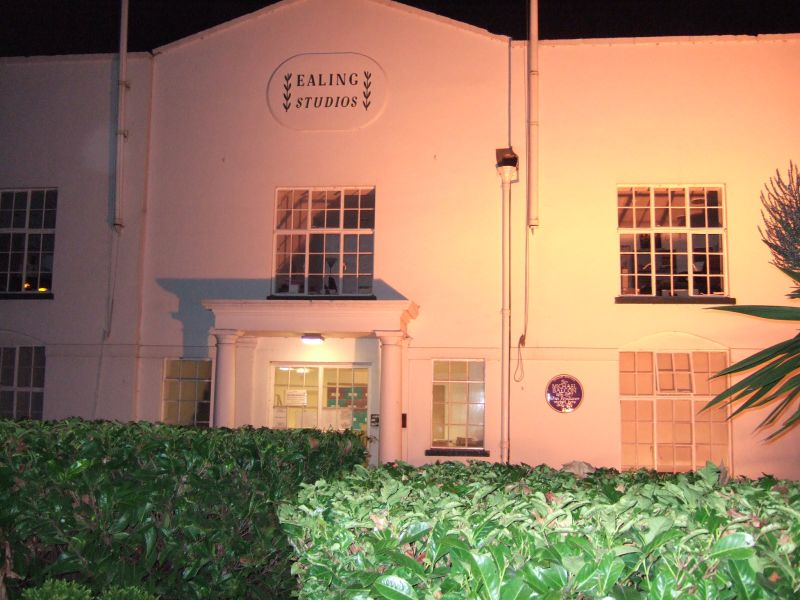
Ealing Studios in west London, where Slocombe started his feature film career

=== Ealing Studios ===
After returning to England, Slocombe became a cinematographer for the British Ministry of Information, shooting footage of Atlantic convoys with the Fleet Air Arm. He also developed a relationship with Ealing Studios, where filmmaker Alberto Cavalcanti, who helped him obtain his position, worked. Some of his photography was used as second unit material for fiction films.

Slocombe moved into photographing for feature films at Ealing Studios during the later 1940s, after being hired on the strength of his documentary work. Slocombe later described his early work on Champagne Charlie (1944) as amateurish, in one case resulting in a sequence having to be reshot. However, in his career, Slocombe worked on 84 feature films over a period of 47 years.

Slocombe would later speak approvingly of Ealing's culture of script development. However, he also noted that its restrictive studio system headed by Michael Balcon, in which outside work was not normally permitted, made it impractical for him to attempt to begin a career as a director, something which he had considered.

His early films as a cinematographer included such classic Ealing comedies, notably Kind Hearts and Coronets (1949), The Man in the White Suit (1951), The Lavender Hill Mob (1951), and The Titfield Thunderbolt (1953). He was particularly praised for his flexible, high-contrast cinematography for the horror film Dead of Night (1945), and for his bright, colourful West Country summer landscapes on The Titfield Thunderbolt.

Apart from filming, Slocombe worked also on developing plans for shots, visiting prisoner-of-war camps in Germany as part of pre-production for The Captive Heart (1946). For Saraband for Dead Lovers (1948), shot in Technicolor, the production team settled on a muted, gloomy style unusual for the time, which Slocombe in 2015 considered as among his best work of the period. The style of the film, about a doomed extramarital affair in 17th-century Germany, was variously praised as unconventional and criticised for being excessively symbolic, while also leaving exterior and interior shots poorly matched.

A special effect shot he created was a scene in Kind Hearts and Coronets, in which Alec Guinness, playing eight different characters, appeared as six of them simultaneously in the same frame. By masking the lens and locking the camera down in one place, the film was re-exposed several times with Guinness in different places on the set over several days. Slocombe recalled sleeping in the studio to make sure nobody touched the camera. Slocombe personally regarded Basil Dearden as the "most competent" of the directors he worked with at Ealing.

He found widescreen equipment sometimes restrictive, finding the Technirama camera system used on Davy (1958) "a block of flats" and difficult to compose shots with.

=== After Ealing ===
Financial problems forced Ealing Studios to wind down from 1955 onwards, and close later in the decade. In 2015, Slocombe said of the period that "we had to get on with our careers – there was little time for sentiment."

For The Italian Job (1969), Slocombe was hired by producer Michael Deeley because "he tended to do very moody work, and he was very efficient". Slocombe later remembered shooting inside Kilmainham Gaol, a genuine closed prison, and finding the experience unpleasant: "the real thing, there is something quite terrifying about it. One knows hundreds and hundreds of people have suffered here...although this was a comedy, all this was still in the back of one's mind".

He won the British Society of Cinematographers Award five times, and was awarded its Lifetime Achievement Award in 1996. He also won a special BAFTA award in 1993. Roger Ebert particularly praised his work on Jesus Christ Superstar (1973), writing that it "achieve[s] a color range that glows with life and somehow doesn’t make the desert look barren." Not all reviews of his later colour work were favourable: while his cinematography on Never Say Never Again (1983) has been described by one author as "subtle, subdued...[it] creates a mellow mood", it has also been assessed as "muddled and brown". Notable among his later films is Rollerball (1975).

=== Indiana Jones films ===
In the 1980s, he worked with Steven Spielberg on the first three Indiana Jones films, after Spielberg enjoyed working with him as an auxiliary cinematographer on Close Encounters of the Third Kind (1977). These were among his last major projects, as he was 75 at the time of filming the last, Indiana Jones and the Last Crusade, and also began to suffer from eyesight problems in the 1980s. He was quoted in 1989 as saying of it "there's an excitement in doing action films. I probably enjoy them on a sort of Boy Scout level." Janusz Kamiński, cinematographer on Indiana Jones and the Kingdom of the Crystal Skull, said that he deliberately shot the film to emulate Slocombe's visuals, in order to create an appearance of continuity with the previous pictures.

== Personal life ==
Slocombe experienced problems with his vision from the 1980s onwards, including a detached retina in one eye and complications from unsuccessful laser eye surgery in the other, and was nearly blind at the end of his life. In his later years, he lived in West London with his daughter, his only child.

He was appointed Officer of the Order of the British Empire (OBE) in the 2008 New Year Honours, and attended a BAFTA dinner in his honour in 2009. He turned 100 in February 2013. Despite his blindness, Slocombe continued to give interviews into his last years, and was interviewed by David A. Ellis in a book entitled Conversations with Cinematographers, in 2011 by French television in French, by the BBC on the invasion of Poland in 2014, and on the history of British films in 2015. He was quoted in the latter interview as saying "it's a weird feeling to have outlived virtually everyone you ever worked with."

=== Death ===
Slocombe died on the morning of 22 February 2016, aged 103, in a London hospital from complications following a fall.

== Filmography ==
Documentary film

Year	Title	Director	Notes
1940	Lights Out in Europe	Herbert Kline	Uncredited
1943	Greek Testament	Charles Hasse	
1943	San Demetrio London	Charles Frend	Uncredited

Feature film

Year	Title	Director	Notes
1941	Ships with Wings	Sergei Nolbandov	Uncredited
1944	For Those in Peril	Charles Crichton	
1945	Painted Boats	Charles Crichton	
1946	The Captive Heart	Basil Dearden	
1947	Hue and Cry	Charles Crichton	
1947	The Loves of Joanna Godden	Charles Frend	
1947	It Always Rains on Sunday	Robert Hamer	
1948	Saraband for Dead Lovers	Basil Dearden	
1948	Another Shore	Charles Crichton	
1949	Kind Hearts and Coronets	Robert Hamer	
1949	A Run for Your Money	Charles Frend	
1950	Dance Hall	Charles Crichton	
1950	Cage of Gold	Basil Dearden	
1951	The Lavender Hill Mob	Charles Crichton	
1951	The Man in the White Suit	Alexander Mackendrick	
1952	His Excellency	Robert Hamer	
1952	Mandy	Alexander Mackendrick	
1953	The Titfield Thunderbolt	Charles Crichton	
1954	The Love Lottery	Charles Crichton	
1954	Lease of Life	Charles Frend	
1955	Ludwig II	Helmut Käutner	
1955	Touch and Go	Michael Truman	
1956	Sailor Beware!	Gordon Parry	
1957	The Man in the Sky	Charles Crichton	
1957	The Smallest Show on Earth	Basil Dearden	
1957	Barnacle Bill	Charles Frend	
1957	Davy	Michael Relph	
1958	Tread Softly Stranger	Gordon Parry	
1960	Circus of Horrors	Sidney Hayers	
1960	The Boy Who Stole a Million	Charles Crichton	
1961	The Mark	Guy Green	
1961	Taste of Fear	Seth Holt	
1961	The Young Ones	Sidney J. Furie	
1962	The L-Shaped Room	Bryan Forbes	
1962	Freud the Secret Passion	John Huston	
1963	The Servant	Joseph Losey	
1964	The Third Secret	Charles Crichton	
1964	Guns at Batasi	John Guillermin	
1965	A High Wind in Jamaica	Alexander Mackendrick	
1965	Promise Her Anything	Arthur Hiller	
1966	The Blue Max	John Guillermin	
1967	Fathom	Leslie H. Martinson	
1967	Robbery	Peter Yates	
1967	The Fearless Vampire Killers	Roman Polanski	
1968	Boom!	Joseph Losey	
1968	The Lion in Winter	Anthony Harvey	
1969	The Italian Job	Peter Collinson	
1970	The Buttercup Chain	Robert Ellis Miller	
1971	Murphy's War	Peter Yates	
1971	The Music Lovers	Ken Russell	
1972	Travels with My Aunt	George Cukor	
1973	Jesus Christ Superstar	Norman Jewison	
1973	The Return	Sture Rydman	Short film
1974	The Great Gatsby	Jack Clayton	
1974	The Marseille Contract	Robert Parrish	
1975	The Maids	Christopher Miles	
1975	Rollerball	Norman Jewison	
1975	That Lucky Touch	Christopher Miles	
1975	Hedda	Trevor Nunn	
1976	The Sailor Who Fell from Grace with the Sea	Lewis John Carlino	
1976	The Bawdy Adventures of Tom Jones	Cliff Owen	
1977	Nasty Habits	Michael Lindsay-Hogg	
1977	Julia	Fred Zinnemann	
1978	Caravans	James Fargo	
1979	The Lady Vanishes	Anthony Page	
1979	Lost and Found	Melvin Frank	
1980	Nijinsky	Herbert Ross	
1981	Raiders of the Lost Ark	Steven Spielberg	
1983	The Pirates of Penzance	Wilford Leach	
1983	Never Say Never Again	Irvin Kershner	
1984	Indiana Jones and the Temple of Doom	Steven Spielberg	
1985	Water	Dick Clement	
1986	Lady Jane	Trevor Nunn	With Derek V. Browne
1989	Indiana Jones and the Last Crusade	Steven Spielberg	

Television

Year	Title	Director	Notes
1957	Play of the Week	Peter Brook	Episode "Heaven and Earth"
1975	Love Among the Ruins	George Cukor	TV movie

== Awards and nominations ==
Academy Awards

Year	Category	Title	Result	Ref.
1972	Best Cinematography	Travels with My Aunt	Nominated	
1977	Best Cinematography	Julia	Nominated	
1981	Best Cinematography	Raiders of the Lost Ark	Nominated	

BAFTA Awards

Year	Category	Title	Result	Ref.
1964	Best Cinematography	The Servant	Won	
1965	Best Cinematography	Guns at Batasi	Nominated	
1967	Best Cinematography	The Blue Max	Nominated	
1969	Best Cinematography	The Lion in Winter	Nominated	
1974	Best Cinematography	Travels with My Aunt	Nominated	
1974	Best Cinematography	Jesus Christ Superstar	Nominated	
1975	Best Cinematography	The Great Gatsby	Won	
1976	Best Cinematography	Rollerball	Nominated	
1979	Best Cinematography	Julia	Won	
1982	Best Cinematography	Raiders of the Lost Ark	Nominated	
1985	Best Cinematography	Indiana Jones and the Temple of Doom	Nominated	

American Society of Cinematographers

Year	Category	Result
2002	International Award	Won

British Society of Cinematographers

Year	Category	Title	Result
1963	Best Cinematography	The Servant	Won
1968	Best Cinematography	The Lion in Winter	Won
1973	Best Cinematography	Jesus Christ Superstar	Won
1974	Best Cinematography	The Great Gatsby	Won
1977	Best Cinematography	Julia	Won
1984	Best Cinematography	Indiana Jones and the Temple of Doom	Nominated
1995	Lifetime Achievement Award		Won

Los Angeles Film Critics Association

Year	Category	Title	Result
1977	Best Cinematography	Julia	Won

== See also ==
- List of centenarians (actors, filmmakers and entertainers)
