= William Rose (screenwriter) =

American screenwriter (1918–1987)

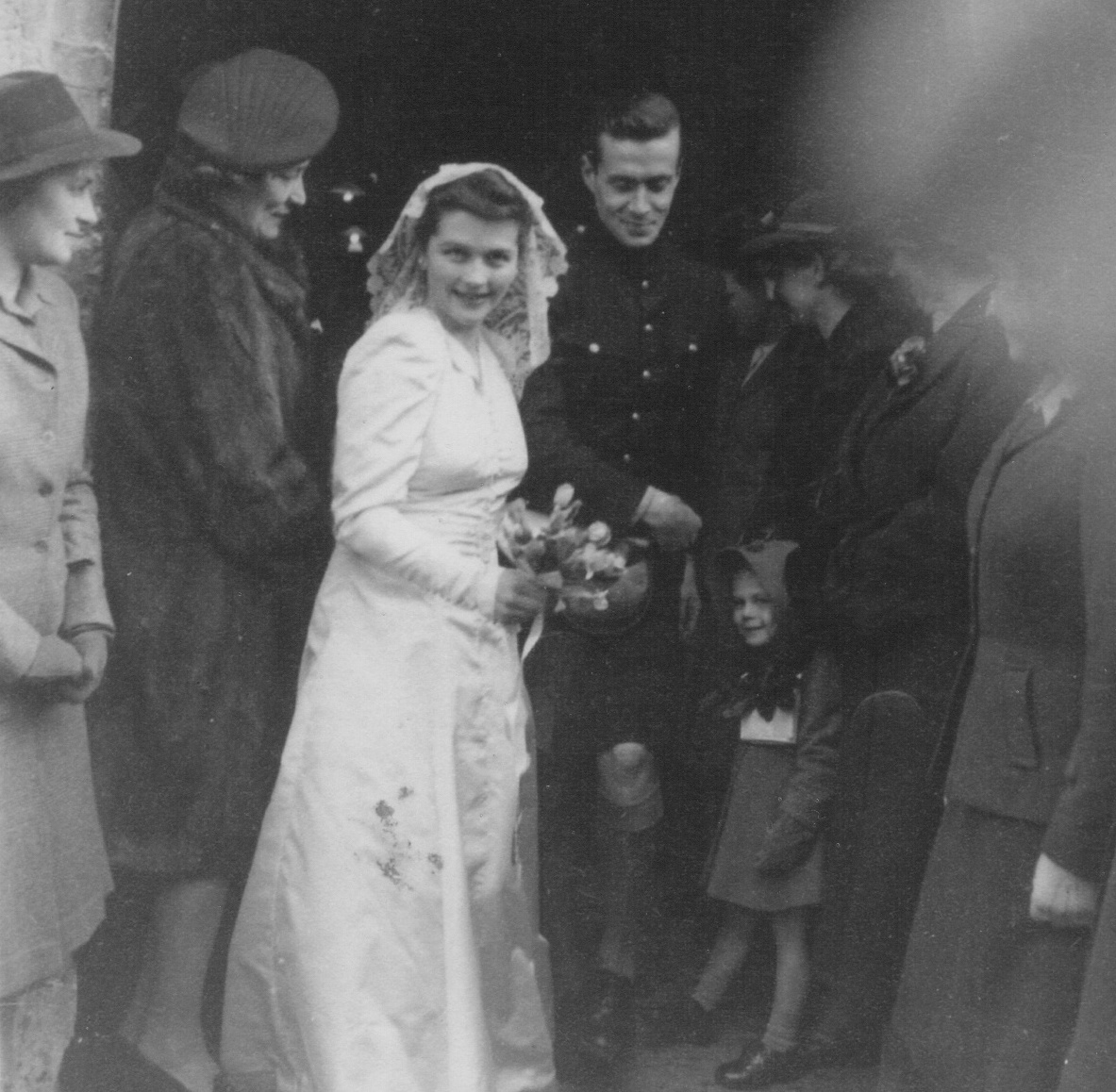
Wedding of William Rose (in his Black Watch uniform) and Tania Price in 1943

William Rose (31 August 1918 – 10 February 1987) was an American screenwriter of British and Hollywood films.

== Life ==
Rose was born in Jefferson City, Missouri. He traveled to Canada after the 1939 outbreak of World War II and volunteered to fight with the Black Watch. After being stationed at bases in Scotland and Europe, Rose returned to live in Britain at war's end to work as a screenwriter, marrying an English woman, Tania Price, with whom he would later collaborate.

In 1964, Rose settled in Jersey in the Channel Islands. His marriage to Tania didn't last. After the couple separated/divorced, Tania returned to live in London in the autumn of 1967. She died in 2015, aged 95. In the 1970s, Rose had a brief relationship with actress Katharine Hepburn.

Rose died in Jersey in 1987. He is buried in the Churchyard at St. Clement Parish Church, Jersey.

== Career ==
Blessed with the ability to adapt to two distinct cultures, William Rose wrote a number of successful British comedies including Genevieve (1953). Rose became a working associate of American-born director Alexander Mackendrick, notably for his collaboration on The Maggie (US: High and Dry, 1954) and The Ladykillers (1955). He also provided scripts for Hollywood studios, earning several Academy Award nominations for his screenwriting and winning the Academy Award for Writing Original Screenplay for Guess Who's Coming to Dinner (1967). Rose also won the Writers Guild of America award for Best Written American Comedy for The Russians Are Coming, the Russians Are Coming (1966).

In 1973, Rose's lifetime achievements were recognized by the Writers Guild of America with their Laurel Award for Screenwriting Achievement.

== Screenwriting awards ==
| Year | Award | Category | Film | Result |
|---|---|---|---|---|
| 1954 | Academy Awards | Best Story and Screenplay | Genevieve | Nominated |
| 1957 | Academy Awards | Best Screenplay – Original | The Ladykillers | Nominated |
| 1966 | Academy Awards | Best Screenplay – Based on Material from Another Medium | The Russians Are Coming, the Russians Are Coming | Nominated |
| 1967 | Academy Awards | Best Story and Screenplay – Written Directly for the Screen | Guess Who's Coming to Dinner | Won |
| 1954 | British Academy Film Awards | Best British Screenplay | The Maggie | Nominated |
| 1955 | British Academy Film Awards | Best British Screenplay | The Ladykillers | Won |
| 1955 | British Academy Film Awards | Best British Screenplay | Touch and Go | Nominated |
| 1957 | British Academy Film Awards | Best British Screenplay | The Man in the Sky (Shared with John Eldridge) | Nominated |
| 1957 | British Academy Film Awards | Best British Screenplay | The Smallest Show on Earth (Shared with John Eldridge) | Nominated |
| 1968 | British Academy Film Awards | Best Screenplay | Guess Who's Coming to Dinner | Nominated |
| 1964 | Edgar Allan Poe Awards | Best Motion Picture Screenplay | It's a Mad, Mad, Mad, Mad World (Shared with Tania Rose) | Nominated |
| 1966 | Golden Globe Awards | Best Screenplay | The Russians Are Coming, the Russians Are Coming | Nominated |
| 1967 | Golden Globe Awards | Best Screenplay | Guess Who's Coming to Dinner | Nominated |
| 1967 | Writers Guild of America Awards | Best Written American Comedy | The Russians Are Coming, the Russians Are Coming | Won |
| 1968 | Writers Guild of America Awards | Best Written American Comedy | The Flim-Flam Man | Nominated |
| 1968 | Writers Guild of America Awards | Best Written American Drama | Guess Who's Coming to Dinner | Nominated |
| 1968 | Writers Guild of America Awards | Best Written American Original Screenplay | Guess Who's Coming to Dinner | Nominated |
| 1972 | Writers Guild of America Awards | Laurel Award for Screenwriting Achievement | —N/a | Honored |

== Filmography ==
| Year | Title | Director | Notes |
|---|---|---|---|
| 1948 | Once a Jolly Swagman | Jack Lee | Credited with Jack Lee & Cliff Gordon |
| 1948 | Esther Waters | Ian Dalrymple; Peter Proud | Credited with Michael Gordon & Gerard Tyrrell |
| 1950 | I'll Get You for This | Joseph M. Newman | Credited with George Callahan |
| 1950 | My Daughter Joy | Gregory Ratoff | Credited with Robert Thoeren |
| 1952 | Gift Horse | Compton Bennett | Credited with William Fairchild & Hugh Hastings |
| 1953 | Genevieve | Henry Cornelius | |
| 1954 | The Maggie | Alexander Mackendrick | |
| 1955 | The Ladykillers | Alexander Mackendrick | |
| 1955 | Touch and Go | Michael Truman | |
| 1957 | The Man in the Sky | Charles Crichton | Credited with John Eldridge |
| 1957 | The Smallest Show on Earth | Basil Dearden | Credited with John Eldridge |
| 1963 | It's a Mad, Mad, Mad, Mad World | Stanley Kramer | Credited with Tania Rose |
| 1966 | The Russians Are Coming, the Russians Are Coming | Norman Jewison | |
| 1967 | The Flim-Flam Man | Irvin Kershner | |
| 1967 | Guess Who's Coming to Dinner | Stanley Kramer | |
| 1969 | The Secret of Santa Vittoria | Stanley Kramer | |
