= Davy (film) =

1958 British film by Michael Relph

- British theatrical poster
- Directed by: Michael Relph
- Written by: William Rose
- Produced by: Basil Dearden
- Starring: Harry Secombe; Alexander Knox; Ron Randell
- Cinematography: Douglas Slocombe
- Edited by: Peter Tanner
- Production company: Ealing Studios
- Distributed by: Metro-Goldwyn-Mayer
- Release date: 2 January 1958
- Running time: 83 minutes
- Country: United Kingdom
- Language: English
- Budget: $458,000
- Box office: $305,000

Davy is a 1958 British comedy-drama film directed by Michael Relph and starring Harry Secombe, Alexander Knox and Ron Randell. It was written by WIlliam Rose. It was the last comedy to be made by Ealing Studios and was the first British film in Technirama. Davy was intended to launch the solo career of Harry Secombe, who was already a popular British radio personality on The Goon Show, but it was only moderately successful.

Secombe said it "was to be my big chance to score a success in films, something I had longed to do ever since I started in the business. My previous attempts at becoming a film star were pretty poor to put it mildly."

== Plot ==
A young entertainer is conflicted over the chance of a big break. He has to decide whether to remain with his family's music hall act or to go solo.

== Main cast ==
- Harry Secombe as Davy Morgan
- Alexander Knox as Sir Giles Manning
- Ron Randell as George
- George Relph as Uncle Pat Morgan
- Susan Shaw as Gwen
- Bill Owen as Eric
- Isabel Dean as Miss Helen Carstairs
- Adele Leigh as Joanna Reeves
- Peter Frampton as Tim
- Joan Sims as tea lady
- Gladys Henson as Beatrice, tea lady
- George Moon as Jerry
- Clarkson Rose as Mrs. Magillicuddy
- Kenneth Connor as Herbie
- Liz Fraser as tea lady
- Charles Lamb as Henry
- Arnold Marlé as Mr. Winkler
- Campbell Singer as stage doorkeeper

Peter Frampton, who plays young Tim, was the son of Harry Frampton, makeup artist for many years at Ealing including in this film. Peter would eventually follow in his father's footsteps and worked as his assistant on several films, including Hitchcock's Frenzy (1972). In 1995, Peter Frampton won the Oscar for Best Makeup for Braveheart. He remembered his filming on Davy fondly, as "it meant time off school and (getting the) star treatment."

== Production ==
The film was one of six made by Ealing Studios under an agreement they had with MGM. The National Film Finance Corporation provided £29,849 of the budget of £198,997. The film was directed by Michael Relph who normally worked as a producer. Relph later said Davy "wasn't very good" and the script by William Rose "wasn’t one of his best." According to Kenneth Tynan who worked for Ealing around this time the movie was the "brainchild" of Rose. Tynan criticised Michael Balcon, head of MGM, for his choice of material on the MGM films. He wrote, "at that stage in your career and at that nadir in the international repute of British films, it might have been worth while to gamble. More worth while, anyway, than making Davy."

== Reception ==
=== Box office ===
According to MGM records, the film earned only $40,000 in the US and Canada and $265,000 elsewhere, resulting (after deduction of distribution costs as well) in a loss to the studio of $279,000. It lost more money than any of the six MGM-Ealing films made in the late 1950s.

Michael Balcon called it "a lovely domestic subject. But my greatest disappointment. It simply did not mean anything in the United States."

Secombe later wrote "part of the reason why Davy failed to impress was that it was billed as a ‘zany’ type movie, overemphasizing the comedy content, whereas it was mostly a dramatic story. Anyway it was not the stepping stone to stardom that I had hoped it would be."

=== Critical ===
The Monthly Film Bulletin wrote: "An uneasy combination of broad farce and crude backstage melodrama, this rather sad production further suffers from a most clumsy and disjointed script. In the circumstances even a cast compacted of hard workers and well-tried character-players can make little impression, The good-natured Harry Secombe, though over-strident as both singer (Puccini's Nessun Dorma ) and comic, does manage to impart a superficial vitality to the proceedings."

Variety called it "an amiable though not sensational pic debut."

Leslie Halliwell wrote: "Curiously unsuccessful vehicle for a popular singing comic; the script and continuity are simply poor, and swamped by the wide screen."

In British Sound Films: The Studio Years 1928–1959 David Quinlan rated the film as "mediocre", writing: "All pretty corny."

The Radio Times Guide to Films gave the film 2/5 stars, writing: "It's a shamelessly sentimental affair that gave Harry Secombe an opportunity to prove there was life outside The Goon Show, as he has to decide whether to stick with the family's struggling music-hall act or seize his chance by auditioning for opera supremo Alexander Knox at Covent Garden. Secombe's spirited rendition of Puccini's Nessun Dorma demonstrates what a fine singer he was, but he seems less comfortable with the more melodramatic aspects of the picture."

TV Guide called the film a "pleasant if unimpressive drama."

Britmovie wrote, "stylistically the film is an awkward combination of broad farce, Secombe having made his name as one of the denizens of the celebrated Goon Show, and awkward, turgid scenes of moral conflict."

Allmovie noted, "a stellar supporting cast enables Davy to overcome its occasional banalities and cliches."

== Notes ==
- Secombe, Harry (1989). Arias & raspberries : the autobiography of Harry Secombe.
