= Touch and Go (1955 film) =

1955 British film by Michael Truman

- Touch and Go UK release poster
- Directed by: Michael Truman
- Written by: William Rose; Tania Rose
- Produced by: Michael Balcon
- Starring: Jack Hawkins; Margaret Johnston; June Thorburn
- Cinematography: Douglas Slocombe
- Edited by: Peter Tanner
- Music by: John Addison
- Production company: Ealing Studios
- Distributed by: J. Arthur Rank Film Distributors
- Release date: 3 October 1955 (London)
- Running time: 85 minutes
- Country: United Kingdom
- Language: English

Touch and Go (U.S. The Light Touch) is a 1955 British comedy film directed by Michael Truman, and starring Jack Hawkins, Margaret Johnston, and June Thorburn. It was written by William Rose and Tania Rose.

== Plot ==
Following an argument with a work superior, furniture designer Jim Fletcher quits his job in a fit of pique. He decides that England has nothing to offer him, and that the future for his family is in Australia. He eagerly sets about making emigration plans, and, despite the fact that his wife and family are less than enthusiastic about moving to the other side of the world, he disregards their reservations and presses ahead.

Practical and bureaucratic hitches continually threaten to derail the project. Jim must also deal with the opposition of his in-laws, finds himself missing his job, and starts to have doubts himself about the wisdom of the move. However, the snags and pitfalls are finally sorted out, and a firm departure date is set. Then, two days before they are due to leave, the Fletchers' daughter meets and instantly falls in love with her ideal man, after he rescues the family cat, Heathcliff. A good deal of heart-searching ensues before the Fletchers decide whether or not to go ahead with emigration during a delay caused by a missing Heathcliff.

== Cast ==
- Jack Hawkins as Jim Fletcher
- Margaret Johnston as Helen Fletcher
- June Thorburn as Peggy Fletcher
- John Fraser as Richard Kenyon
- Roland Culver as Reg Fairbright
- Alison Leggatt as Alice Fairbright
- Margaret Halstan as Mrs. Pritchett
- Henry B. Longhurst as Mr. Pritchett
- James Hayter as Kimball
- Basil Dignam as Stevens
- Bessie Love as Mrs. Baxter
- Gabrielle Brune as waitress
- Warwick Ashton as policeman
- Dorothy White as girl on the bridge
- Liz Fraser as girl on the bridge (as Elizabeth Winch)
- Alfred Burke as man on the bridge

== Production ==
The film was made by Ealing Studios.

== Reception ==
=== Box office ===
The film was indifferently received on release, and is not generally included in the canon of classic Ealing Comedies. According to Kinematograph Weekly it was a "money maker" at the British box office in 1955.

=== Critical reception ===
The Monthly Film Bulletin wrote: "Although Touch and Go does not match the invention or wit of William Rose's earlier scripts (Genevieve, The Maggie, etc.), the writer's flair for creating likeable characters is again apparent, and there is an agreeable touch of malicious humour in the handling of such characters as the father and mother-in-law. Unfortunately it is quite obvious, almost from the outset, that this particular family will never reach Australia (young lovers are rarely parted and animals never neglected in the British cinema), and this fact makes for a rather dead climax. Michael Truman (directing his first film) employs a gentle, unhurried style in keeping with the mood of the piece, but does not succeed in disguising the thinness of the material itself; and the young lovers suffer from the distressing coyness invariably associated with members of English screen and radio families. Jack Hawkins as the harassed father sometimes employs an over-emphatic technique, but his playing generally displays a pleasant comic sense. Margaret Johnston, in the under-written part of his wife, suffers nobly and wins through in the end. Altogether, a slight and insubstantial film, which, nevertheless, evokes a gentle and amiable mood."

The Radio Times called the film "A depressing wallow in the sort of whimsy that Ealing foisted upon the world as British Realism." Leonard Maltin was more positive, calling the film a "wry study".

== Accolades ==
The film picked up two nominations at the 1956 British Academy Film Awards: Margaret Johnston for "Best British Actress", and William Rose for "Best British Screenplay."
