= The Ladykillers (1955 film) =

1955 comedy film by Alexander Mackendrick

- Original film poster by Reginald Mount
- Directed by: Alexander Mackendrick
- Written by: William Rose
- Produced by: Michael Balcon
- Starring: Alec Guinness; Cecil Parker; Herbert Lom; Peter Sellers; Danny Green; Jack Warner; Frankie Howerd; Katie Johnson
- Cinematography: Otto Heller
- Edited by: Jack Harris
- Music by: Tristram Cary
- Production company: Ealing Studios
- Distributed by: The Rank Organisation
- Release date: 8 December 1955 (UK)
- Running time: 91 minutes
- Country: United Kingdom
- Language: English

The Ladykillers is a 1955 British black comedy crime film directed by Alexander Mackendrick for Ealing Studios. It stars Alec Guinness, Cecil Parker, Herbert Lom, Peter Sellers, Danny Green, Jack Warner, and Katie Johnson as the old lady, Mrs. Wilberforce.

William Rose wrote the screenplay, for which he was nominated for an Academy Award for Best Original Screenplay and won the BAFTA Award for Best British Screenplay. He claimed to have dreamt the entire film and merely had to remember the details when he awoke.

== Plot ==
Parker, Lom, Guinness, and Green, with Katie Johnson

Mrs. Wilberforce is a sweet and eccentric old widow who lives alone in a gradually subsiding house, built over the entrance to a railway tunnel in Kings Cross, London. With nothing to occupy her time and an active imagination, she is a frequent visitor to the local police station where she reports fanciful suspicions regarding neighbourhood activities. The officers there humour her but give her reports no credence whatsoever.

She is approached by a sly and sinister character, "Professor" Marcus, who wants to rent rooms in her house. Mrs. Wilberforce is not aware that Marcus has assembled a gang of hardened criminals for a sophisticated security van robbery at the nearby railway station, who plan to use Mrs. Wilberforce's house as a base of operations. The gang includes the jittery and gentlemanly con-man Major Courtney, the Cockney spiv Harry Robinson, the punch-drunk ex-boxer 'One-Round' Lawson and the cruel and vicious continental gangster Louis Harvey. As a cover, Marcus convinces the naive Mrs. Wilberforce that the group is an amateur string quintet using the rooms for rehearsal space. To maintain the deception, the gang members carry musical instruments and play records of Boccherini and Haydn during their planning sessions.

The criminals successfully carry out the heist, and trick Mrs. Wilberforce into retrieving the disguised money from the railway station herself. As the gang departs her house with the loot, One-Round accidentally gets his cello case full of banknotes trapped in the front door. As he pulls the case free, banknotes spill forth while Mrs. Wilberforce looks on. After she learns from a visiting friend that a robbery has taken place nearby, Mrs. Wilberforce finally sees the gang's true colours and informs Marcus that she is going to the police.

Stalling, the gangsters try to convince Mrs. Wilberforce that she will be considered an accomplice for holding the cash. Marcus asserts that the heist was a victimless crime as insurance will cover all the losses and the police will probably not even accept the money back. Mrs. Wilberforce wavers, but eventually she rallies, and the criminals decide they must kill her. No one wants to do it, so they draw lots using matchsticks. The Major loses, but he tries to make a run for it with the cash.

While Mrs. Wilberforce dozes off, the criminals double-cross each other and end up killing one another in rapid succession. The Major falls off the roof of the house after being chased by Louis. Harry attempts to escape with the money, but he is killed by One-Round. One-Round tries to shoot Louis, but leaves his gun's safety catch on and Marcus kills him. The bodies have been dumped into railway wagons passing under a catwalk bridge behind the house and are now far away. Marcus kills Louis by luring him down a ladder by the bridge and dislodging it, causing Louis to fall into a wagon. Before falling into the wagon, Louis fires a last shot at Marcus which nearly hits him. Within moments, Marcus himself is struck on the head by a changing railway signal arm, and his body drops into another wagon.

Mrs. Wilberforce is now left alone with the plunder. She goes to the police station, but they do not believe her story. They humour her, telling her to "keep the money". She is puzzled but finally relents and returns home. Along the way, she leaves a banknote of large denomination with a perplexed poor artist.

== Cast ==
- Alec Guinness as Professor Marcus
- Cecil Parker as Major Claude Courtney
- Herbert Lom as Louis Harvey
- Peter Sellers as Harry Robinson
- Danny Green as "One-Round" Lawson
- Jack Warner as the superintendent
- Katie Johnson as the old lady, Mrs. Louisa Wilberforce
- Philip Stainton as the station sergeant
- Frankie Howerd as the barrow boy
- Kenneth Connor as the taxi driver (uncredited)
- Lucy Griffiths as Miss Pringle (uncredited)
- Harold Goodwin as the parcels clerk (uncredited)
- Stratford Johns as a security guard (uncredited)

== Casting ==
Alec Guinness is thought to have based his performance of Professor Marcus on the actor Alastair Sim, as he believed that the role was made for Sim; although critic Philip French wrote in 2015 that "there's another possible source for the appearance of Marcus, with his prominent teeth and pale, cadaverous features, and that is the self-publicising critic and man of the theatre Kenneth Tynan, who had written a monograph on Guinness and been an assistant on the disastrous 1951 Festival of Britain production of Hamlet starring Guinness."

Robinson was the first major film role for Peter Sellers; he would later appear with Lom in five of The Pink Panther films.

Sellers and Guinness would appear together again in Murder by Death (1976).

== Production ==
The Ladykillers was the last Technicolor three-strip movie filmed in the UK, although The Feminine Touch was the last feature to be filmed in this process and released three months later, in 1956.

When Alec, as the Professor, is killed by a railway signal falling onto his head, the production crew made sure that this would not in fact happen by placing a metal pin half an inch above the level of Alec's head. Lines were drawn in chalk to mark where he should stand for the shot. When it came to the take, however, the signal sheared the metal pin and tore the back of Alec's jacket. He had been standing an inch or two in front of the chalk mark – a mistake that saved his life.

— Piers Paul Read

William Rose left the production midway, following arguments with director Alexander Mackendrick and associate producer Seth Holt, leaving them to complete the script from his notes.

== Awards and nominations ==
Award	Category	Nominee(s)	Result
Academy Awards	Best Screenplay – Original	William Rose	Nominated
British Academy Film Awards	Best Film from any Source	The Ladykillers	Nominated
British Academy Film Awards	Best British Film	The Ladykillers	Nominated
British Academy Film Awards	Best British Actress	Katie Johnson	Won
British Academy Film Awards	Best British Screenplay	William Rose	Won

== Reception ==
=== Box office ===
According to the National Film Finance Corporation, the film made a comfortable profit. It was the last financially successful Ealing film made under its association with Rank.

=== Critical response ===
The film received critical acclaim from critics. On review aggregator Rotten Tomatoes, the film holds a rare approval rating of 100% based on 35 reviews, with an average score of 8.7/10. The website's consensus reads, "The Ladykillers is a macabre slow-burn with quirky performances of even quirkier characters." On Metacritic, the film received a score of 91 based on 7 reviews, indicating "universal acclaim".

The British Film Institute ranked The Ladykillers the 13th greatest British film of all time. In 2017 a poll of 150 actors, directors, writers, producers and critics for Time Out magazine saw it ranked the 29th best British film ever.

=== Reputation ===
In 2000, readers of Total Film magazine voted The Ladykillers the 36th greatest comedy film of all time, and The Guardian labelled it the 5th greatest comedy of all time in 2010.

== Adaptations ==
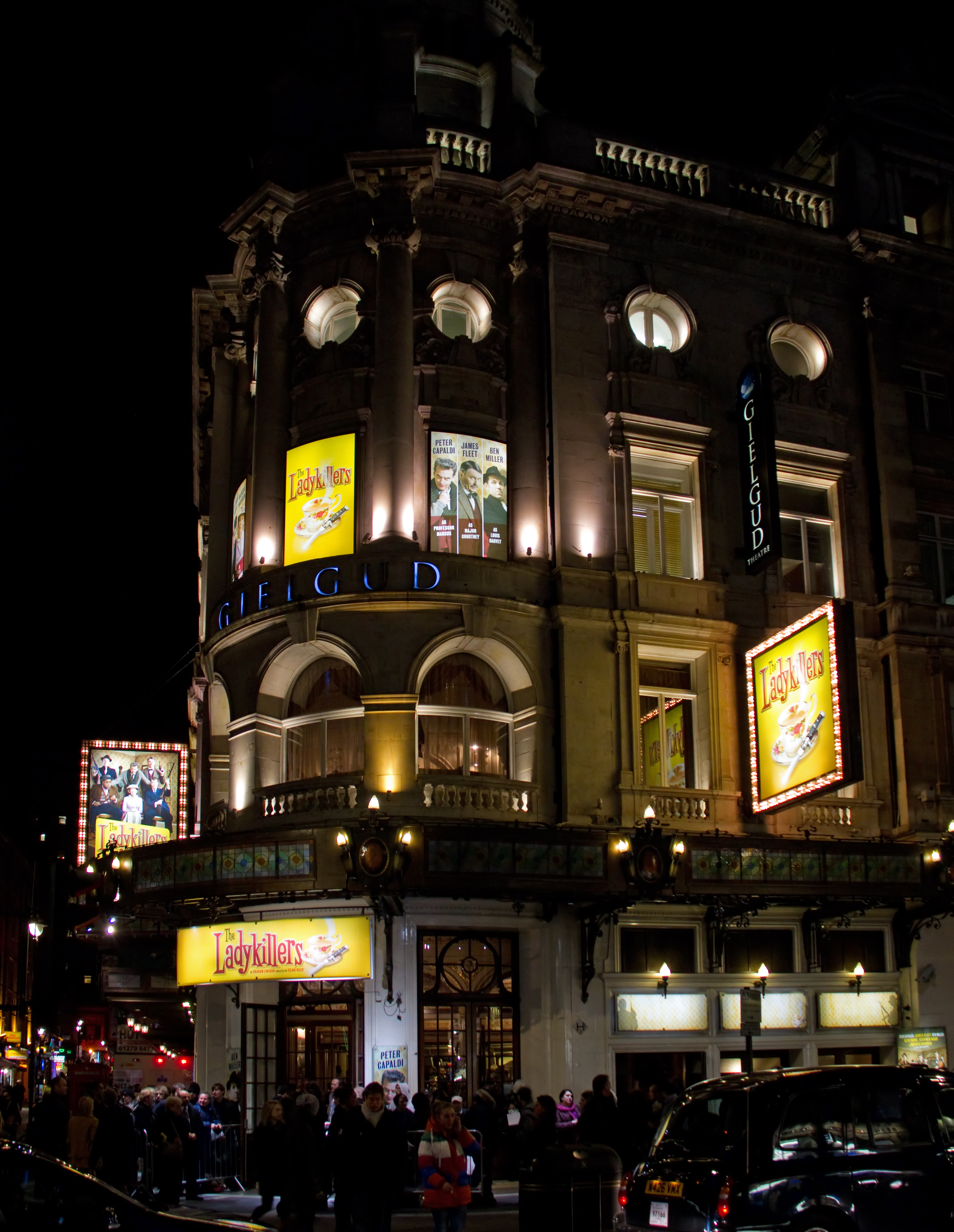
The Ladykillers playing at the Gielgud Theatre in the West End, December 2011.

- In 1966, the film was adapted into an opera by the Czech composer Ilja Hurník under the name The Lady and the Robbers (Dáma a lupiči), which was premiered in Brno in October 1973.
- In 1969, the film was adapted into Egyptian film "Thieves But Funny" (original name: لصوص ولكن ظرفاء) starring Ahmed Mazhar and Adel Emam.
- On 13 January 1996, an adaptation for radio of the film, by Bruce Bedford, was first broadcast on BBC Radio 4 starring Edward Petherbridge and Margot Boyd.
- In 2004, the Coen brothers directed an American remake of the film, starring Tom Hanks, Irma P. Hall, Marlon Wayans, J. K. Simmons, Tzi Ma and Ryan Hurst. The setting of the film is moved from London to Saucier, Mississippi, home of a riverboat casino.
- In 2011, the film was adapted as the play The Ladykillers by Graham Linehan. It premiered at the Liverpool Playhouse in November that year before transferring to the Gielgud Theatre in London with Peter Capaldi as Professor Marcus.
- In 2013, the play was revived at the London Vaudeville Theatre and subsequently toured the UK and Ireland. This revived production featured a new cast.
- In June 2019, the play had its North American premiere at the Shaw Festival in Niagara-on-the-Lake, Ontario, Canada with Damien Atkins as Professor Marcus and Chick Reid as Mrs. Wilberforce.

== See also ==
- BFI Top 100 British films
- The Pardoner's Tale
