= It Always Rains on Sunday =

- Original British quad poster
- Directed by: Robert Hamer
- Screenplay by: Angus MacPhail; Robert Hamer; Henry Cornelius
- Based on: It Always Rains on Sunday by Arthur La Bern
- Produced by: Michael Balcon
- Starring: Googie Withers; John McCallum; Jack Warner
- Cinematography: Douglas Slocombe
- Edited by: Michael Truman
- Music by: Georges Auric
- Production company: Ealing Studios
- Distributed by: GFD (UK)
- Release date: 25 November 1947 (UK)
- Running time: 92 minutes
- Country: United Kingdom
- Language: English
- Budget: £180,936
- Box office: over £400,000 (UK) ($US $1.6 million)

It Always Rains on Sunday is a 1947 British film directed by Robert Hamer and starring Googie Withers, John McCallum and Jack Warner. It was written by Angus MacPhail, Hamer and Henry Cornelius, adapted from Arthur La Bern's 1945 novel of the same name. The film has been compared with the poetic realism movement in the French cinema of a few years earlier by the British writers Robert Murphy and Graham Fuller. It has also been cited as one of the earliest examples or precursors of kitchen-sink realism.

== Synopsis ==
The film concerns events taking place one Sunday (23 March 1947, according to the announcement blackboard at the local underground station) in Bethnal Green, a part of the East End of London that had suffered the effects of bombing and post-war deprivation. Rose Sandigate is a former barmaid married to a middle-aged man who has two teenage daughters from a previous marriage. She is now a housewife, but with her wounded heart and kindly husband is coping with the difficulties of post-war rationing and a drab environment. As Rose discovers from a newspaper report, her former lover, Tommy Swann, who has served four years of a seven-year sentence for robbery with violence, has escaped from Dartmoor prison and is on the run. A series of flashbacks indicate that Rose and Tommy were engaged when he got arrested, and he may well be the father of her young son. She is surprised by him, hiding in the family's air-raid shelter. He asks her to hide him until nightfall. After the rest of the family have gone out, she allows Tommy into the house and feeds him and hides him in the bedroom she shares with her husband, keeping the bedroom door locked.

She manages to keep his presence a secret from the family, but it is Sunday and the lunch must be cooked. The girls are admonished for their misdemeanours of the previous night, and the husband goes out to the pub as usual. Tommy needs money, and with only her housekeeping money, she gives him a jewelled ring he gave her, which she has kept hidden from her husband. Tommy is pleased, but although he fails to recognise it as the engagement ring he had given her, she says nothing. As the day progresses, the police net closes. A newspaper reporter acting on a tip unexpectedly calls at the house to ask about her previous relationship with the escaped convict and arrives just as Tommy is about to flee, and Tommy assaults him and rushes out of the house. Recovering, the reporter rushes out to tip off the police. A panic-stricken Rose tries to gas herself. The prisoner is tracked by the police to railway sidings and after a chase is arrested by the detective inspector (Jack Warner) who has been after him. As the film ends, Rose is in hospital recovering, being comforted by her husband, who then returns alone to their home under a clear sky.

== Main cast ==
- Googie Withers as Rose Sandigate
- Edward Chapman as George Sandigate
- Susan Shaw as Vi Sandigate
- Patricia Plunkett as Doris Sandigate
- David Lines as Alfie Sandigate
- Sydney Tafler as Morry Hyams
- Betty Ann Davies as Sadie Hyams, Morry's wife
- John Slater as Lou Hyams, Morry's brother
- Jane Hylton as Bessie Hyams, Morry's sister
- Meier Tzelniker as Solly Hyams, Morry's father
- John McCallum as Tommy Swann
- Jimmy Hanley as Whitey
- John Carol as Freddie
- Alfie Bass as Dicey Perkins
- Jack Warner as Detective Sergeant Fothergill
- Frederick Piper as Detective Sergeant Leech
- Michael Howard as Slopey Collins
- Hermione Baddeley as doss-house keeper
- Nigel Stock as Ted Edwards
- John Salew as Caleb Neesley
- Gladys Henson as Mrs Neesley
- Edie Martin as Mrs Watson
- Vida Hope as Mrs Wallis
- Arthur Hambling as yardmaster
- Grace Arnold as landlady

== Reception and reputation ==
=== Box office ===
The film was one of the most popular movies at the British box office in 1948. According to Kinematograph Weekly the film was a runner up for box-office winner.

The film earned distributor's gross receipts of £229,834 in the UK of which £188,247 went to the producer. The film made a profit of £7,311.

=== Critical ===
In the decades since its release, the reputation of It Always Rains on Sunday has grown from that of a neatly engrossing slice-of-life drama to a film often cited as one of the most overlooked achievements of late-1940s British cinema.

Writing in Films in Review in 1987, William K. Everson described the film as "the definitive British noir", while a series of screenings in New York in 2008 as part of a British Film Noir season elicited tremendous praise from American critics, many of whom were previously unacquainted with the film.

Scott Cruddas of The Village Voice described it as "a masterpiece of dead ends and might-have-beens, highly inventive in its use of flashbacks and multiple overlapping narratives, and brilliantly acted by Withers and McCallum".

The New York Sun's S. James Snyder observed: "When things go from gray to pitch black in the film's final moments, building to a climax that links the anguish of a prison inmate with the daily routine of a working-class wife, (the film) delivers an existential wallop for the ages".

David Denby wrote in The New Yorker: "A fascinating noirish look at life in London's East End...the scenes between Withers and McCallum are stunningly erotic", while Stephen Garrett of Time Out summed the film up as: "Absolutely exhilarating! A bleak thriller realised with utter vibrancy, Robert Hamer's savoury stew of London's lower class roils with an emotional brutality and precision that most films don’t dare attempt, let alone achieve."

The film was given a theatrical re-release in the UK during 2012. Peter Bradshaw reviewing the film in The Guardian commented: "The film is in many ways a precursor to kitchen-sink movies like Saturday Night and Sunday Morning – and that huge, teeming market scene bears comparison with Carné's Les Enfants du Paradis."
