= Walter Elliott (sound editor) =

American sound editor

- Born: November 19, 1903; Des Moines, Iowa, USA
- Died: August 10, 1984 (aged 80); Carrollton, Texas, USA
- Other name: Walter G. Elliot
- Occupation: Sound editor
- Years active: 1933–1963

Walter Elliott (November 19, 1903 – August 10, 1984) was an American sound editor who won Best Sound Editing at the 1963 Academy Awards making him the first person to ever win the award. He won it for his work in the 1963 Stanley Kramer film It's a Mad, Mad, Mad, Mad World.

== Selected filmography ==
- It's a Mad, Mad, Mad, Mad World (1963)
- Judgment at Nuremberg (1961)
- The Defiant Ones (1958)
- Mighty Joe Young (1949)
- The Son of Kong (1933)
- King Kong (1933)
