= Genevieve (film) =

- Original 1953 lobby card
- Directed by: Henry Cornelius
- Written by: William Rose
- Produced by: Henry Cornelius
- Starring: Dinah Sheridan; John Gregson; Kay Kendall; Kenneth More
- Cinematography: Christopher Challis
- Edited by: Clive Donner
- Music by: Larry Adler
- Production company: Sirius Productions
- Distributed by: The J. Arthur Rank Organisation
- Release date: 28 May 1953 (UK)
- Running time: 86 minutes
- Country: United Kingdom
- Language: English
- Budget: £124,658
- Box office: $1,050,000 (UK) $400,000 (US)

Genevieve is a 1953 British comedy film produced and directed by Henry Cornelius and written by William Rose. It stars John Gregson, Dinah Sheridan, Kenneth More and Kay Kendall as two couples comedically involved in a veteran automobile rally.

It was a significant commercial success on release, and has been called "perhaps the most successful British comedy film ever made."

== Plot ==
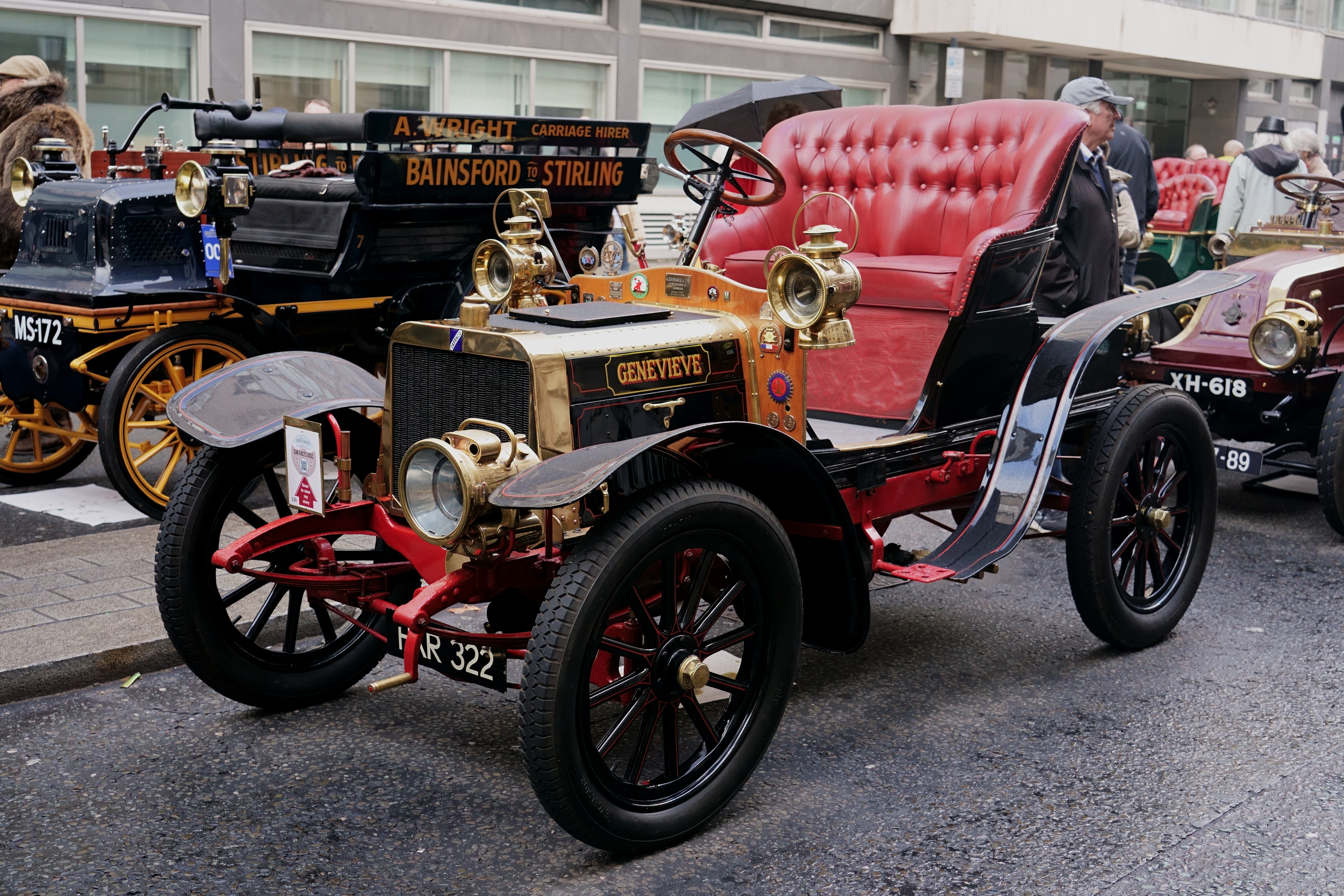
The Darracq "Genevieve" 10/12 hp, seen here in London in 2024

Two veteran cars and their crews are participating in the annual London to Brighton Veteran Car Run. Alan McKim, a young barrister, and his wife, Wendy, drive Genevieve, a 1904 Darracq. Their friend Ambrose Claverhouse, a brash advertising salesman, his latest girlfriend, fashion model Rosalind Peters, and her pet St. Bernard ride in a 1905 Spyker.

The journey to Brighton goes well for Claverhouse, but the McKims' trip is complicated by several breakdowns, and they arrive very late. As Alan cancelled their accommodation in their usual plush hotel during a fit of pique, they are forced to spend the night in a dingy run-down hotel leaving Wendy feeling less than pleased.

They finally join Ambrose and Rosalind for after-dinner drinks, but Rosalind gets very drunk, and insists on playing the trumpet with the house band. To the surprise of all, she performs a hot jazz solo before falling fast asleep moments later, to Wendy's great amusement.

Alan and Wendy have an argument over Ambrose's supposed romantic attentions to her, and Alan goes off to the garage to sulk. Whilst he works on his car in the middle of the night, Ambrose turns up. Angry words are exchanged, and Alan impulsively bets the other man £100 that he can beat Ambrose back to London, despite racing not being allowed by the club. Ambrose accepts the bet—"First over Westminster Bridge."

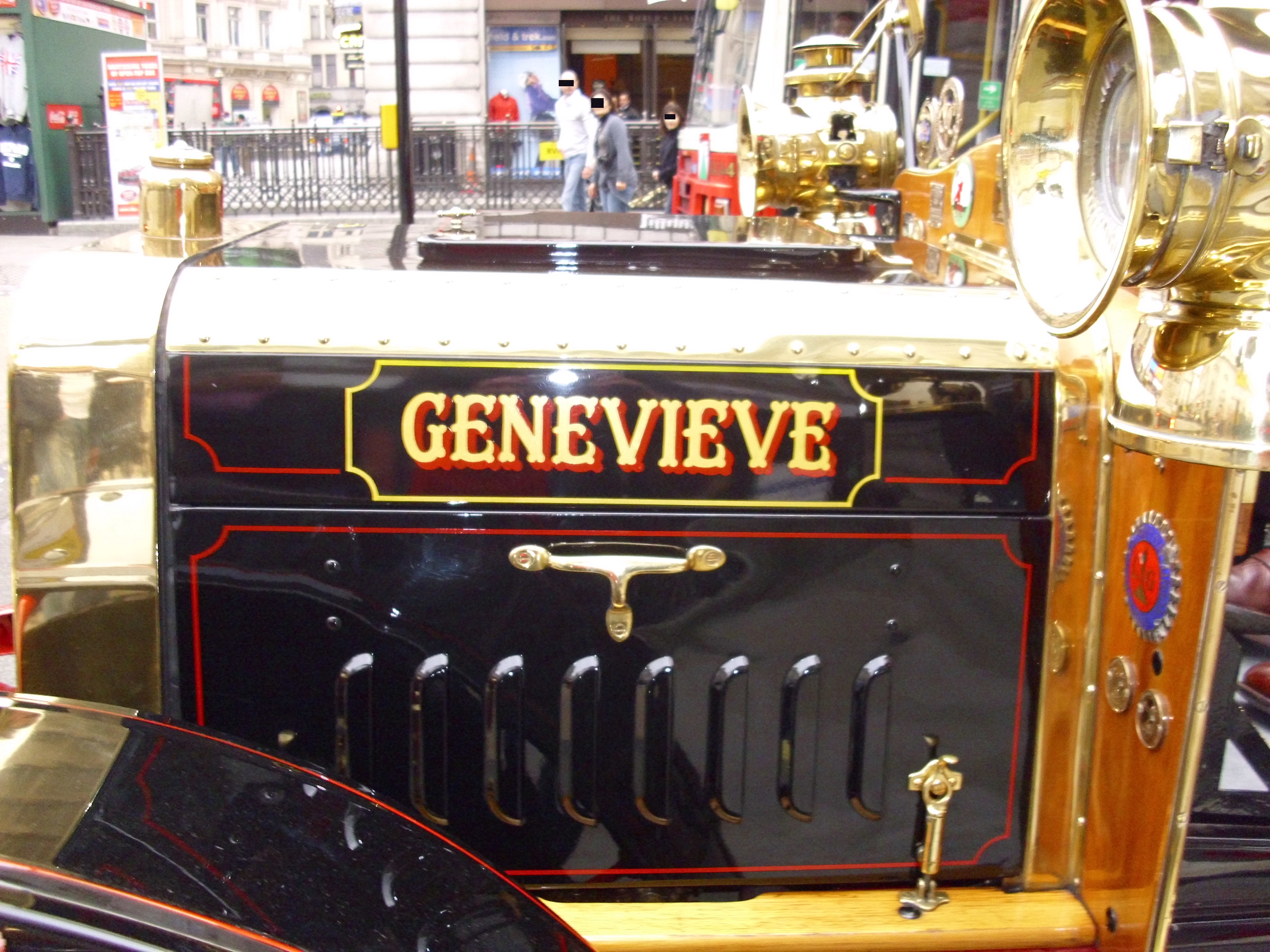
Emblem of the Darracq

The following morning, despite Rosalind's massive hangover and Wendy's determined disapproval of the whole business, the two crews race back to London. Each driver is determined that his car is the better, come what may, and they both resort to various forms of cheating. Ambrose sabotages Alan's engine, and Alan causes Ambrose to be stopped by the police.

Finally, on the outskirts of London, both cars are stopped by traffic police and the four contestants are publicly warned after Alan and Ambrose almost come to blows. At Wendy's insistence, they decide to call off the bet and have a party instead. But whilst waiting for the pub to open, words are exchanged and the bet is on again.

The two cars race neck-and-neck through the southern suburbs of London. But with only a few yards to go, Genevieve breaks down. As Ambrose's car is about to overtake it, its tyres become stuck in tramlines (London's last trams ran in 1952, but many of the tracks were still in evidence when the film was made that same year) and it drives off in another direction. The brakes on Genevieve fail, and the car rolls a few yards onto Westminster Bridge, thus winning the bet.

== Cast ==
- John Gregson as Alan McKim
- Dinah Sheridan as Wendy McKim
- Kenneth More as Ambrose Claverhouse
- Kay Kendall as Rosalind Peters
- Geoffrey Keen as First Traffic Policeman
- Reginald Beckwith as J.C. Callahan
- Arthur Wontner as Elderly Gentleman
- Joyce Grenfell as Hotel Proprietress
- Leslie Mitchell as Himself, Newsreel Commentator
- Michael Balfour as Trumpeter (uncredited)
- Stanley Escane as Newsreel Cameraman (uncredited)
- Fred Griffiths as Ice Cream Seller (uncredited)
- Charles Lamb as Publican (uncredited)
- Arthur Lovegrove as Hotel Doorman (uncredited)
- Edward Malin as Spectator (uncredited)
- Edie Martin as Guest At Hotel (uncredited)
- Michael Medwin as Father-to-Be (uncredited)
- Harold Siddons as Second Traffic Policeman (uncredited)
- Patrick Westwood as Motor Mechanic (uncredited)

== Production ==
=== Development ===
Henry Cornelius had made Passport to Pimlico for Ealing Studios, but had left the studio to go independent and make The Galloping Major, which annoyed Michael Balcon, head of production at Ealing. Cornelius developed Genevieve with writer William Rose. Cornelius approached Balcon with an outline for Genevieve and asked to make it at Ealing. However, Balcon turned the film down. Balcon later claimed in his memoirs "I knew at once it could not miss" but "our own schedule of films was arranged and if I took Corny [Cornelius] back it would mean displacing another director, an idea which would not have proved popular for good and valid reasons. Although Corny was immensely popular with his ex-colleagues at Ealing, he had left of his own volition and, by the way, it was very rare for anybody to leave Ealing."

Balcon claims he sent Cornelius to Earl St John, head of production at Rank, the company which owned Ealing (where Balcon had complete autonomy) but made other films through different company. St John was originally not enthusiastic to make the movie - Jill Craige said "the people at Pinewood thought it was too slight. That was the criticism."

St John did agree to take the film to the Rank Board if the budget could be kept to £115,000. The board agreed to provide 70% of the finance if Cornelius could source the rest elsewhere; the director obtained the money from the National Film Finance Corporation. This method was used to make films at British Film-Makers however Genevieve was produced through a separate company, Sirius Productions.

According to Erica Masters, who worked on the film as an assistant, Rank "said to Corney, 'Oh you can't use the people you want, we will give you people.' And at that point, Corney said, 'Look, I'm putting up 'X' amount of money and I am going to have the people I want.'"

Cornelius also obtained private finance. According to Christopher Challis, who shot the film, Cornelius had to "raise the completion guarantee from mortgaging his house."

Writer Jill Craigie claimed she worked with Cornelius "a lot" on the "wonderful" script for Genevieve uncredited. She says Cornelius and his wife were enthusiastic supporters of psychoanalysis and had the characters in the script "analysed to see if they were all correct, and this was all correct and it was all very good." She says Cornelius' wife's psychiatrist told the director "I've got a Communist patient who has a terrible complex, and if he puts a bit of money into Genevieve, and if he loses a bit of money in film, maybe that will cure his guilt complex. So it was really it was the psychiatrist who got the communist to back Genevieve. Well because Genevieve had got independent money in it they managed to get some sort of distribution agreement."

=== Casting ===
According to Dinah Sheridan, the original choices for the male leads were Guy Middleton and Dirk Bogarde; they turned the film down, and their roles were given to Kenneth More and John Gregson respectively. Sheridan also claimed the studio wanted Claire Bloom to play her part. Sheridan was offered two other films around the same time (Grand National Night and Street Corner) and asked Dirk Bogarde for his advice. According to Sheridan, "He told me to take Genevieve if I got it. He had turned it down because he didn’t want to do comedy again... I can’t remember who they wanted instead of Kay Kendall."

Sheridan first met Cornelius at a restaurant called ‘The Vendome’:

I squeezed into a window seat, and when Henry Cornelius finally came in he said in a loud voice, ‘I see you're sitting with your back to the light because you know you’re too old for this part’. It was not a charming start, and that sort of thing continued all the way through the film. He was not a character I would have enjoyed working for again. After the near-fatal hunch with Henry Cornelius, Bill Rose [screenwriter] came in and we had a few glasses of wine. I must have relaxed and been funny because I was offered the role.

Kenneth More was appearing in the enormously successful production of The Deep Blue Sea when Henry Cornelius approached him to play the part of Ambrose. More said Cornelius never saw him in the play, but cast him on the basis of his screen test for Scott in the Antarctic and work in an earlier film, The Galloping Major which Cornelius had directed. More's fee has been reported as being £3,500 or £4,000. According to More, Kay Kendall was already cast when Cornelius offered him his part.

=== Shooting ===
Filming took place between October 1952 and February 1953 over 57 days, with three quarters of the movie shot outside, which was rare for the time. Most filming took place near Pinewood Studios. Challis said "it was the first film made on location in all weather. Up until around that time if you had sunlight and everything was matching you couldn't shoot, if the light went yellow at four o'clock you couldn't shoot." However because of the low budget of Genevieve he said "in order to have a hope of making it" they had to "shoot every day irrespective of weather" and not "rely on whether there's enough light to get an exposure."

More recalls "the shooting of the picture was hell. Everything went wrong, even the weather." More says because of Cornelius' perfectionism the film went over budget by £20,000 and the insurance company had to provide the extra money. More wrote the insurance company "didn’t like paying out. To save a bit here and save a bit there, it had little men prowling around the studio, switching off lights that weren’t needed. During the final week’s shooting they watched the electricity meters like hawks. It was as bad as having the bailiffs in." Erica Masters said "the studio [Rank] couldn't have been more unhelpful" during the shoot. "They just thought, 'These small people, they haven't got much money, what kind of a film are they doing?' They had their own people; they don't really want to know."

However Sheridan said "We got on so well together and it worked. Ninety per cent of the credit must go to Bill Rose, a wonderful writer." More said "we enjoyed ourselves immensely" during filming although he disliked making a movie and appearing in a play at the same time.

Challis said the movie "was a photographic horror from the academic view of things but it was a successful picture and so it got a good write up for the photography." He called the movie "a documentary in weather which was totally out of continuity, nothing matches. But we had fun doing it and it was a marvellous script."

Rutland Mews South, London SW7, was used during filming as the location for the home of Alan and Wendy.

More says John Gregson did not have a full driving licence when he made the movie.

=== Music ===
The themes of the musical score were composed and performed by Larry Adler, and harmonised and orchestrated by composer Graham Whettam who wrote the orchestral scores incorporating Larry Adler's tunes. Dance numbers were added by Eric Rogers. Adler wrote in his memoirs that he became involved in the film when Vivienne Knight, who did publicity for Rank, head him playing at a party and arranged a meeting between him and Cornelius. Adler loved the script but the producer did not have enough money to pay his requested fee; he accepted 2.5% of the producer's profits, which turned out to be lucrative. However when the film was released in the US, Adler's name was left off the credits due to his perceived left wing sympatheties and was replaced by Muir Mathieson, who had conducted the orchestra but not composed the music.

Kendall's trumpet solo was mimed to a rendition by the jazz trumpeter Kenny Baker.

Sound editor Harry Miller recalled Cornelius "he ran short of money towards the end. And I looked at the rough cut and I thought, “Blimey, this is going to be a winner... How much do you want Corny, and if I’ve got a chance to put a few bob in it and I’ll do it.” But he said, “No” he said “I want to get it all in one go if I can Harry.” You know? And anyway he got the money, the end money, from someone and I never had any money in Genevieve, which was unfortunate."

The comedic tone of Genevieve was established by the following disclaimer at the end of the opening credits:

For their patient co-operation the makers of this film express their thanks to the officers and members of the Veteran Car Club of Great Britain. Any resemblance between the deportment of our characters and any club members is emphatically denied—by the Club.

This was meant to underscore the fact that the actual event portrayed in the film is not a race.

== Cars ==
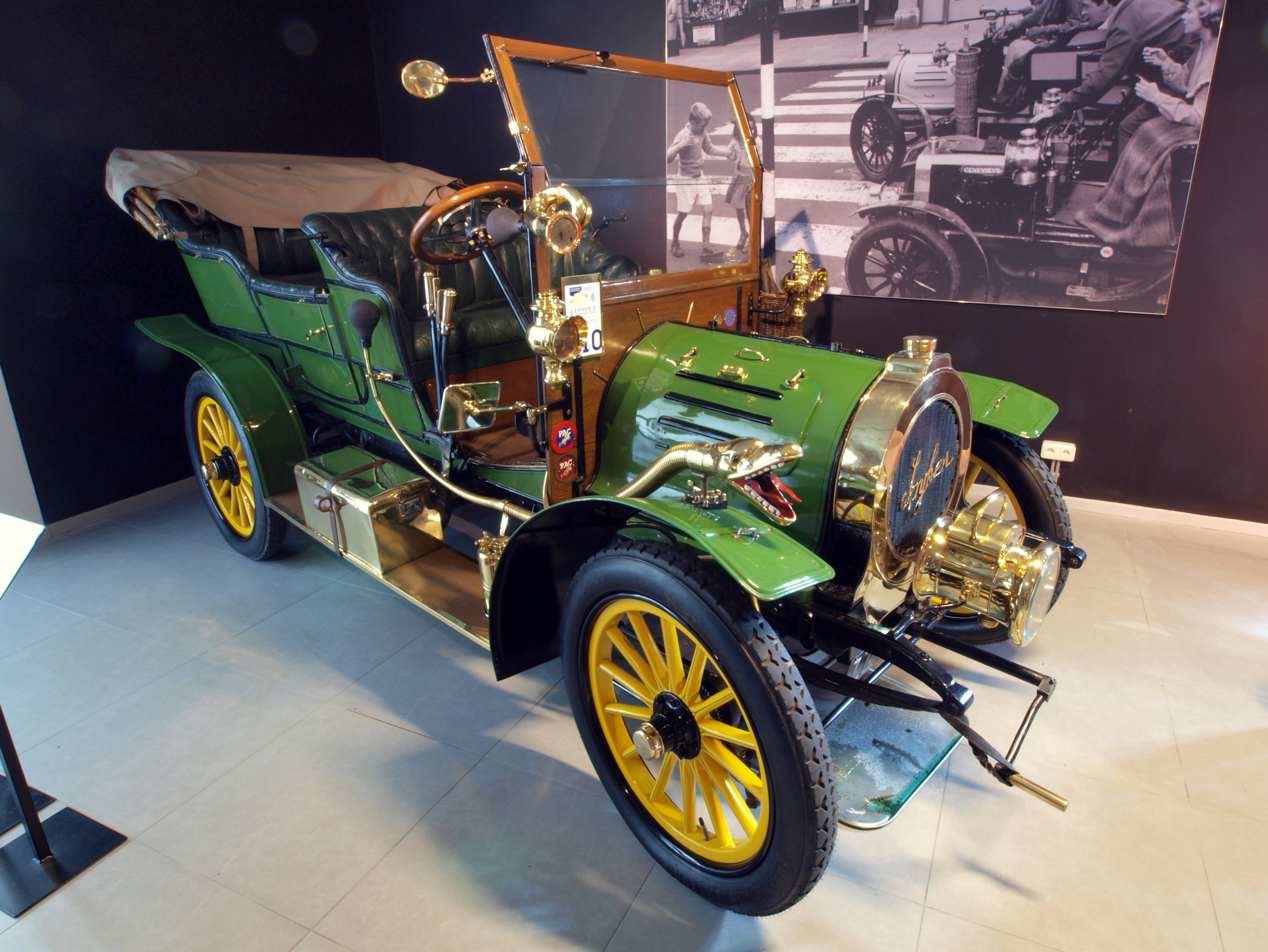
The 1905 Spyker 12/16-HP Double Phæton that was used as Ambrose Claverhouse's car in the film. As of 2012, this car was held in the Louwman Museum in the Netherlands, along with Genevieve. A still from the film can be seen in the background

The script for Genevieve originally called for the rivals to be driving British cars, Alan McKim a Wolseley or Humber, and Ambrose Claverhouse a Lanchester. No owners of such cars were willing to lend them for filming, and eventually Norman Reeves loaned his Darracq and Frank Reese his Spyker. The Darracq was originally named Annie, but was permanently renamed Genevieve after the film's success. Genevieve returned from a 34-year visit to Australia in 1992, and takes part in the London-Brighton Run every year. In July 2002, Genevieve and another Spyker participated in a 50th anniversary rally, touring the filming locations. Both Genevieve and Ambrose Claverhouse's Spyker were, as of 2012, on display at the Louwman Museum in The Hague.

== Reception ==
=== Critical ===
The Daily Telegraph complained that "William Rose's script has no verbal wit and the characterisation is implausible... but the situations are farcical in a fresh and pleasant way." The Observer called it "a modest but amusing trifle."

Variety called the film "a top-ranking comedy which will get full laughs wherever it is shown... should prove to be a top money-maker. It is funny nonstop with a chuckle in almost every foot."

Genevieve was critically reviewed by Bosley Crowther for The New York Times, giving the film a very positive appraisal. "On the strength of the current mania that some restless people have for automobiles of ancient vintage—what are fondly called "veteran cars"—a British producer-director, Henry Cornelius, has made a film that may cautiously be recommended as one of the funniest farce comedies in years."

=== Box office ===
Adler wrote in his memoirs "when Genevieve was completed, Rank hated it. He put it on the shelf and it looked as if it wasn’t going to get a release. It was previewed in Germany and laid a Chinese egg. Nobody seemed to think it was funny." However Erica Masters says after they showed the film to J. Arthur Rank who liked it, "the whole atmosphere of the studio had changed. They couldn't do more than enough for us! They had heard from Rank that he liked the film, that he believed in it, that he thought it was marvellous, and that changed everybody's attitude."

According to Michael Balcon, when the film was first shown Earl St John approached William Rose and Henry Cornelius, "put his arms around their shoulders and said in the nicest possible way—and he was, indeed, a very kindly man— something to the effect that they were not to be depressed; he believed in them and they would surely make a good film sooner or later."

Clive Donner, who edited the movie, called Earl St John "a sweet man, great personality but pretty hopeless. He hadn't really much of a clue" citing the fact that St John thought Genevieve was hopeless based on a rough cut. He says St John wanted to cut the film down, but Cornelius arranged for the film to be previewed which was successful.

Keith Robertson, then of General Film Distributors, later recalled the film "at first, was very cooly received. But somehow, with word of mouth, it took off and the results were amazing." More wrote "Although the West End critics had been sparing in their praise, every suburban cinema that showed the film was packed. It was the British public, bless their hearts, who made Genevieve. They saw it, liked it, and by recommending it to friends turned it into a hit."

Genevieve became the second-most popular film at the British box office in 1953. Cornelius later claimed, "The secret of the success of Genevieve was the fact that it was a non-topical, timeless kind of story. People went to see it three, four and five times. You see, basically, people are just interested in people."

The film was released in the US by Universal. According to one report in Variety the film grossed $560,000 in the US. Other accounts in the same magazine give this figure as $450,000 or $400,000 of which $338,000 was returned to Britain. Nonetheless, John Davis placed an advertisement in the New York Times where he accused American distributors of putting films such as Genevieve, Simba, The Purple Plain and The Cruel Sea in art house cinemas instead of mainstream cinemas.

According to the National Film Finance Corporation, the film made a comfortable profit. A 1957 article put the film's profit then at £500,000. Adler said the film went into profit within a month and "my children went to college on Genevieve."

The movie was reissued on a double bill with Doctor in the House that was called "the greatest reissue double bill of all time."

Genevieve initiated a cycle of other comedies from the Rank Organisation. It helped turn the lead actors into film stars, particularly More. Dinah Sheridan retired shortly afterwards because she married John Davis, chairman of Rank.

Michael Balcon called Genevieve "perhaps the most successful British comedy film ever made— written by an Ealing man and directed by another, but, alas, not at Ealing!"

=== Awards and nominations ===
Award	Category	Nominee(s)	Result
Academy Awards	Best Story and Screenplay	William Rose	Nominated
Academy Awards	Best Music Score of a Dramatic or Comedy Picture	Larry Adler	Nominated
British Academy Film Awards	Best Film from any Source	Genevieve	Nominated
British Academy Film Awards	Best British Film	Genevieve	Won
British Academy Film Awards	Best British Actor	Kenneth More	Nominated
Golden Globe Awards	Best Foreign Film	Genevieve	Won (Note: Tied with The Lady of the Camelias, No Way Back and Twenty-Four Eyes.)
National Board of Review Awards	Top Foreign Films	Genevieve	6th Place

== It's a Mad, Mad, Mad, Mad World ==
According to the commentary on the Criterion edition of It's a Mad, Mad, Mad, Mad World, nearly a decade later Rose used Genevieve as the basis for the former, another automobile comedy, but on a larger scale and set in Scotland. He sent an outline to Stanley Kramer, who as luck would have it was ready to make a comedy after a string of intense dramas which had been critical successes but hadn't made money. Kramer agreed to buy the project provided they would change the setting to America. Rose agreed, and he and his wife Tania wrote the screenplay. Released in 1963, the film became the biggest box-office hit of Rose's career.

== See also ==
- BFI Top 100 British films
