= Tania Rose =

German-born British screenwriter

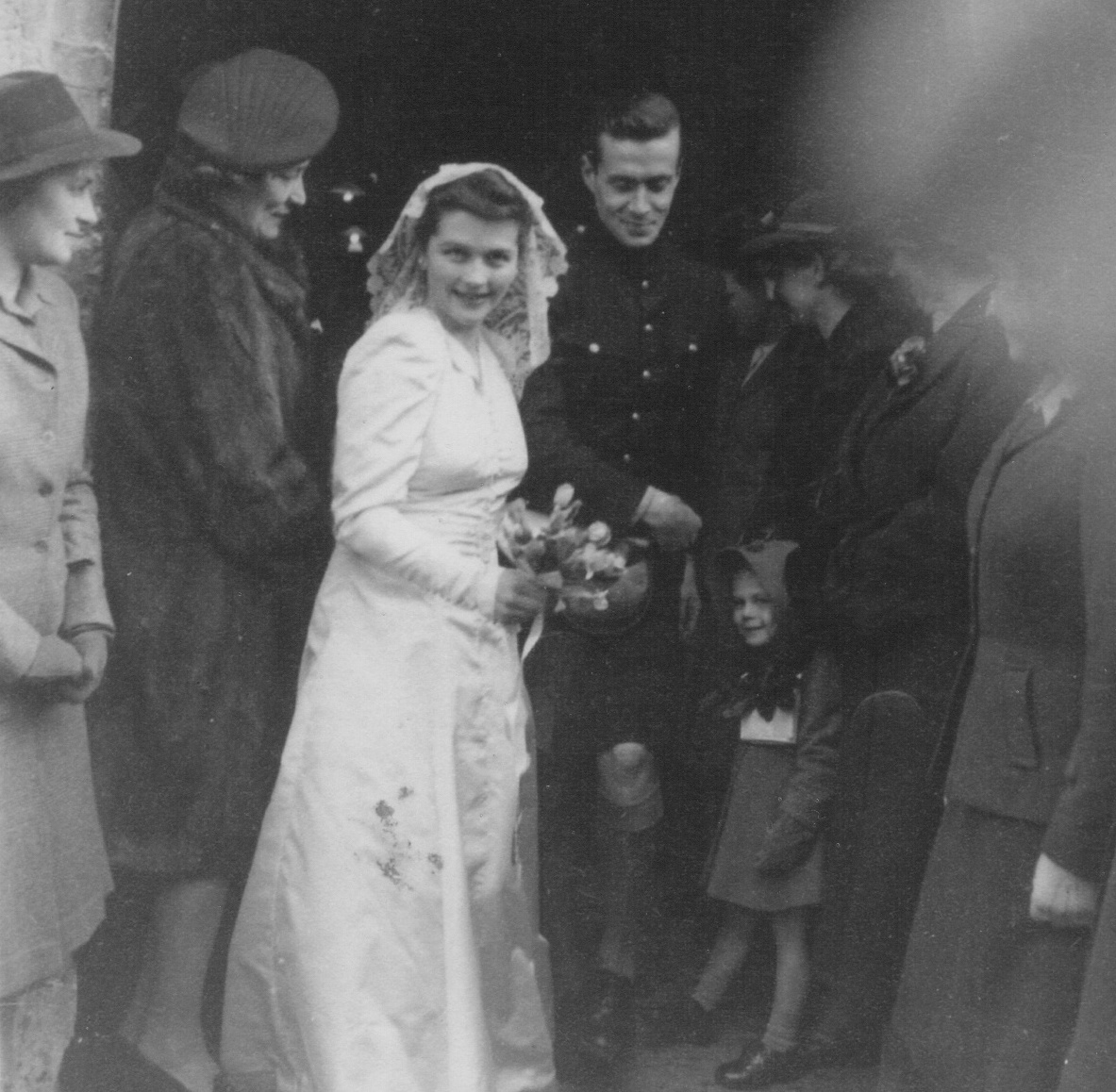
- Rose (left) with her husband William, 1944
- Born: Margaret Tatiana; 20 May 1920; Berlin, Germany
- Died: 15 October 2015 (aged 95); Tibberton, Gloucestershire, England
- Education: University of Hull
- Occupation: Screenwriter
- Spouse: William Rose (m. 1943; div. 1967)

Margaret Tatiana (20 May 1920 – 15 October 2015) was a German-born British screenwriter. She was best known for writing the films Touch and Go, It's a Mad, Mad, Mad, Mad World and Guess Who's Coming to Dinner along with her husband William Rose.

In 1979, Rose was appointed Order of the British Empire, "for services to race relations".

Rose died in Tibberton, Gloucestershire on 15 October 2015, at the age of 95.
