= The Man in the Sky =

1957 British film by Charles Crichton

- Original UK quad format film poster
- Directed by: Charles Crichton
- Screenplay by: John Eldridge; William Rose
- Story by: William Rose
- Produced by: Michael Balcon
- Starring: Jack Hawkins; Elizabeth Sellars
- Cinematography: Douglas Slocombe
- Edited by: Peter Tanner
- Music by: Gerard Schurmann
- Production company: Ealing Films
- Distributed by: Metro-Goldwyn-Mayer
- Release date: 24 January 1957 (UK)
- Running time: 86 minutes
- Country: United Kingdom
- Language: English
- Budget: $486,000
- Box office: $500,000

The Man in the Sky (released in the U.S. as Decision Against Time) is a 1957 British thriller drama film directed by Charles Chrichton and starring Jack Hawkins and Elizabeth Sellars. The screenplay was by John Eldridge and William Rose. A test pilot strives to land a stricken prototype plane.

== Plot ==
Test pilot John Mitchell is married, has two young sons, and lives in a rented semi-detached house in the suburbs of Wolverhampton. He disappoints his wife Mary by refusing to increase their bid to buy a house from £3,500 to the asking price of £4,000, which he says they cannot afford. What she does not know is that the aircraft manufacturing company he works for is in desperate financial straits. Owner Reginald Conway needs to convince potential buyer Ashmore to place an order soon or the firm will go bankrupt. Mitchell takes the only prototype of a new freight aeroplane for a flight, with Ashmore and several of Conway's employees aboard. It has the maximum cargo on board: three heavy vehicles including a Rolls-Royce. Ashmore explains he is close to accepting a deal. During testing, one engine catches fire.

Ashmore and the others parachute to safety over the airfield. Mitchell is able to extinguish the fire by diving the aeroplane, but loses half of his aileron control in the process. It is suggested to fly on for two hours to reduce the fuel. Then, despite Conway's order and the urgings of others, he decides to try to land the aeroplane rather than crashing it into the sea. However, he has to fly back and forth for half an hour to use up fuel, shifting the centre of gravity in the aircraft away from the dead engine to make the landing more feasible. Ashmore is convinced of the aircraft's value by its performance in the dive and expresses confidence in Mitchell's ability to land it.

A freelance journalist comes to the airfield to collect information for a story. As he waits for the plane to use up enough fuel to try a landing, the journalist tries to sell the story to a newspaper and is told that they will pay him £50 for the story if the plane crashes, but if the pilot lands the plane safely the newspaper does not want the story.

During the tense wait, after all the others have rejected the idea as serving no purpose, office worker Mrs Snowden takes it upon herself to notify Mitchell's wife by phone, anyway. Mary goes to the airfield and watches as her husband undertakes the tricky landing. She gets a friend to drive her home so Mitch is unaware that she saw the whole thing. Later, at home, she demands to know why he risked his life when everyone told him to bail out. He explains that while he felt it was his duty with the company's fate hanging in the balance, he took the risk out of love and concern for the welfare of his family. Then he phones the estate agent and agrees to the seller's price of the house mentioned earlier.

== Cast ==
- Jack Hawkins as John "Mitch" Mitchell
- Elizabeth Sellars as Mary Mitchell
- Jeremy Bodkin as Nicholas Mitchell, John's young son
- Gerard Lohan as Philip Mitchell, John's other young son
- Walter Fitzgerald as Reginald Conway
- John Stratton as Peter Hook
- Eddie Byrne as Ashmore
- Victor Maddern as Joe Biggs
- Lionel Jeffries as Keith
- Donald Pleasence as Crabtree
- Catherine Lacey as Mary's Mother
- Megs Jenkins as Mrs Snowden
- Ernest Clark as Maine, the designer
- Raymond Francis as Jenkins
- Russell Waters as Sim
- Howard Marion-Crawford as Ingrams, a freelance journalist

== Production ==
The film was produced by Ealing Films, Michael Balcon's new company, set up after Rank had sold Ealing Studios in Ealing Green, West London, to the BBC in 1955. Balcon, who had run the company on behalf of Rank since 1944, left Rank in 1956 and set up the new company, striking a distribution and production deal with MGM. This was the first Ealing production to be made at MGM-British Studios in Borehamwood, North London.

Much of the filming of The Man in the Sky was done at Pendeford airfield near Wolverhampton, now a housing estate. The aircraft portraying the "Wolverhampton Freighter" was Bristol 170 Wayfarer Mk.IIA G-AIFV of Silver City Airways, a type that had actually been flying since 1946. During filming, the aircraft overshot the runway, damaging the nose and wing. After filming, the aircraft returned to service with Silver City Airways until May 1962, when it was scrapped; Bristol Freighter 170 Mk.31 also appeared in the film.

== Reception ==
=== Box office ===
The Man in the Sky premiered in London at the Empire, Leicester Square on 24 January 1957. According to MGM records, The Man in the Sky earned $150,000 in the US and Canada and $350,000 elsewhere causing MGM a loss of $176,000.

Charles Crichton felt the film "didn't do particularly well" because "the climax was an emotional climax rather than a physical one."

=== Critical reception ===
Monthly Film Bulletin said "Crichton's direction is firm and clean-cut, though he cannot disguise the thin spots in Rose's script. Performances are generally competent, though Hawkins' mannerisms prevent him giving any real depth to the character of Mitchell. Among the supporting cast Victor Maddern, as usual, plays with particular assurance. In attempting to combine a conventional tension story with a psychological exploration of the hero, The Man in the Sky does not wholly succeed: the background material slows down the pace of the adventure story; the necessary heroics leave insufficient time for penetrating characterisation. Nevertheless the film is a thoroughly respectable and often a compelling production."

The Times called it "an Ealing film with a difference".

The Radio Times Guide to Films gave the film 2/5 stars, writing: "Although he excelled at playing principled everymen, Jack Hawkins was never at his most convincing when called upon to express emotion. Thus, he contributes a rather uneven performance to this mediocre Ealing outing about the trials and tribulations of a test pilot. While at the controls of a prototype aeroplane, he's every inch the action hero, particularly during the final test flight. But once Hawkins gets home to demanding wife Elizabeth Sellars, Charles Crichton's melodrama loses direction."

Leslie Halliwell said: "Thin suspense drama with some effective moments but too many irrelevant asides."

In British Sound Films: The Studio Years 1928–1959 David Quinlan rated the film as "good", writing: "Excellent at both ends, film is not quite so hot in the middle."

Aviation film historian Stephen Pendo in Aviation in the Cinema (1985) considered the film as part of the lineage of the "test pilot-hero" films of the 1950s. Michael Paris in From the Wright Brothers to Top Gun: Aviation, Nationalism, and Popular Cinema (1995) shared a similar perspective on the film.

== See also ==
- List of British films of 1957
