= Guess Who's Coming to Dinner =

1967 film by Stanley Kramer

- Theatrical release poster
- Directed by: Stanley Kramer
- Written by: William Rose; Tania Rose (uncredited)
- Produced by: Stanley Kramer
- Starring: Spencer Tracy; Sidney Poitier; Katharine Hepburn; Katharine Houghton
- Cinematography: Sam Leavitt
- Edited by: Robert C. Jones
- Music by: Frank De Vol
- Distributed by: Columbia Pictures
- Release dates: December 11, 1967 (New York City); December 12, 1967 (United States)
- Running time: 108 minutes
- Country: United States
- Language: English
- Budget: $4 million
- Box office: $56.7 million

Guess Who's Coming to Dinner is a 1967 American romantic comedy drama film produced and directed by Stanley Kramer and written by William Rose. It stars Spencer Tracy (in his final role), Sidney Poitier, Katharine Hepburn, and Hepburn's niece Katharine Houghton (in her debut film role).

The film was one of the first of the time to depict an interracial marriage in a positive light, as such marriages historically had been illegal in many states of the United States. Six months before the film was released, interracial marriage was still illegal in 17 states, and filming ended shortly before anti-miscegenation laws were struck down by the Supreme Court in Loving v. Virginia on June 12, 1967.

The film was the ninth and final on-screen pairing of Tracy and Hepburn. Tracy was very ill during filming but insisted on continuing. Filming of his role was completed just 17 days before his death in June 1967, with the film being released six months later. Hepburn, who was Tracy's longtime romantic partner, stated she never saw the completed film, saying it would be too painful for her.

In 2017, on its 50th anniversary, the film was selected for preservation in the United States National Film Registry by the Library of Congress as being "culturally, historically, or aesthetically significant". The film's Oscar-nominated score was composed by Frank De Vol.

== Plot ==
In 1967, Joanna Drayton, a 23-year-old white woman, returns from her Hawaiian vacation to her parents' home in San Francisco with Dr. John Prentice, a 37-year-old black widower. The couple became engaged after a ten-day romance. Joanna's parents are Matt Drayton, a newspaper owner, and his wife, Christina, who owns an art gallery. Though the Draytons are liberal-minded, they are shocked that their daughter is engaged to a man of a different race. Christina gradually accepts the situation, but Matt objects because of the likely unhappiness and seemingly insurmountable problems the couple will face.

Unbeknownst to Joanna, John tells the Drayton parents he will withdraw from the engagement unless both Draytons give the couple their blessing. To complicate matters, John is soon scheduled to travel to Geneva, Switzerland, for three months in his work with the World Health Organization. His answer from the Draytons will determine whether Joanna follows him. Joanna invites John's parents to fly up from Los Angeles to join them for dinner that evening. John has not told them his fiancée is white. Monsignor Mike Ryan, Matt's golf buddy, arrives and tells Matt and the couple that he is supportive of the engagement. Ryan is amused by his old liberal friend's principles fetching up against reality. Christina tells Matt she, too, is supportive of Joanna, even if it means fighting Matt. Christina fires her bigoted art gallery manager, Hilary St. George, who nosily intrudes and voices her sympathy for Christina's situation.

John's parents, the Prentices, arrive and are shocked to discover that Joanna is white. The two mothers agree that this was an unexpected event but support their children. The two fathers meet, expressing disapproval at this unhappy occasion. The Monsignor advises John not to withdraw, despite Matt's objections. John and his father discuss their generational differences. John's mother tells Matt that he and her husband have forgotten what it was like to fall in love, and their failure to remember true romance has clouded their thinking. John chides Matt for not having the "guts" to tell him he disapproved of the marriage. Finally, Matt reveals his decision about the engagement to the entire group. He concludes that he does remember what true romance is. He says although the pair face enormous problems, they must find a way to overcome them, and he will approve the marriage, knowing all along he had no right to stop it. The families and the Monsignor then adjourn to the dining room for dinner.

== Cast ==
- Spencer Tracy as Matt Drayton
- Sidney Poitier as Dr. John Wade Prentice
- Katharine Hepburn as Christina Drayton
- Katharine Houghton as Joanna "Joey" Drayton
- Cecil Kellaway as Monsignor Mike Ryan
- Beah Richards as Mrs. Mary Prentice
- Roy E. Glenn Sr. as Mr. John Prentice Sr.
- Isabel Sanford as Matilda "Tillie" Binx
- Virginia Christine as Hilary St. George
- Alexandra Hay as carhop
- Barbara Randolph as Dorothy
- D'Urville Martin as Frankie
- Skip Martin as delivery boy
- Jacqueline Fontaine as singer in Japanese cocktail lounge (uncredited)

== Influences ==
It has been suggested that a pair of contemporary cases of interracial marriage influenced Rose when he was writing the film's script.

Peggy Cripps, an aristocratic debutante whose father had been a British cabinet minister and whose grandfather had been leader of the House of Lords, married the African anti-colonialist Nana Joe Appiah. They established their home in Appiah's native Ghana, where he subsequently held office as a minister and ambassador.

At around the same time, Lloyd's underwriter Ruth Williams and her husband, African aristocrat Kgosi Seretse Khama, were engaged in a struggle of their own. Their union, which also occurred in the immediate aftermath of World War II, led to a storm of comment that snowballed into an international incident which saw them stripped of their chiefly titles in his homeland and exiled to Britain. They ultimately returned to Khama's native Botswana as its inaugural president and first lady.

When Prentice calls his parents in Los Angeles, their phone number has the telephone exchange name Axminster, which corresponded to the Crenshaw District–Leimert Park.

== Production ==
According to Kramer, he and Rose intentionally structured the film to debunk ethnic stereotypes. The young doctor, a typical role for the young Sidney Poitier, was created idealistically perfect, so that the only possible objections to his marrying Joanna would be his race, or the fact she had only known him for 10 days; the character has thus graduated from a top school, begun innovative medical initiatives in Africa, refused to have premarital sex with his fiancée despite her willingness, and leaves money in an open container on his future father-in-law's desk in payment for a long-distance phone call he has made. Kramer and Rose completed the film script in five weeks.

Kramer stated later that the principal actors believed so strongly in the premise that they agreed to act in the project even before seeing the script. Production had been set for January 1967 and ended on May 24, 1967. At age 67, Tracy was in poor health with heart disease, diabetes, high-blood pressure, respiratory disease, and other ailments. Aware of Tracy's declining health, insurance companies refused to cover him for the period of filming. Kramer and Hepburn put their salaries in escrow so that if he should die during the production, filming could be completed with another actor. According to Kramer, "You're never examined for insurance until a few weeks before a picture starts. [Even] with all his drinking and ailments, Tracy always qualified for insurance before, so nobody thought it would be a problem in this case. But it was. We couldn't get insurance for Spence. The situation looked desperate. So then we figured out a way of handling it. Kate and I put up our own salaries to compensate for the lack of an insurance company for Spence. And we were allowed to proceed."

The filming schedule was altered to accommodate Tracy's failing health. All of Tracy's scenes and shots were filmed between 9:00 am and noon of each day to give him adequate time to rest for the remainder of the day. For example, most of Tracy's dialogue scenes were filmed in such a way that during close-ups on other characters, a stand-in was substituted for him.

Tracy's failing health was more serious than most people working on the set were aware of. According to Poitier: "The illness of Spencer dominated everything. I knew his health was very poor and many of the people who knew what the situation was didn't believe we'd finish the film, that is, that Tracy would be able to finish the film. Those of us who were close knew it was worse than they thought. Kate brought him to and from the set. She worked with him on his lines. She made sure with [Stanley] Kramer that his hours were right for what he could do, and what he couldn't do was different each day. There were days when he couldn't do anything. But also there were days when he was great, and I got the chance to know what it was like working with Tracy."

A bust of Tracy sculpted by Hepburn herself was used as a prop, on the bookshelf behind the desk where Poitier makes his phone call.

Tracy died two weeks after he completed his work on the film.

Hepburn significantly helped cast her niece, Katharine Houghton, for the role of Joey Drayton. Concerning this, Hepburn stated: "There was a lovely part for Kathy [Houghton], my niece [...] She would play Spencer's and my daughter. I loved that. She's beautiful and she definitely had a family resemblance. It was my idea."

According to Hepburn, the role of Joey Drayton was one of Houghton's first major roles as a young actress. "The part of my daughter," Kate said, "was a difficult one. A young unknown actress needs more opportunity to win the sympathy of the audience. Otherwise, too much has to depend on her youth, innocence, and beauty. She had one good speech to win the audience, but it was cut. Instead she only talks with her father about the differences between the principles he taught her and the way he's behaving."

Poitier frequently found himself starstruck, and as a result, a bit tongue-tied in the presence of Hepburn and Tracy, whom he considered to be "giants" as far as acting is concerned. However, Poitier reportedly found a way to overcome his nerves. "When I went to play a scene with Tracy and Hepburn, I couldn't remember a word. Finally, Stanley Kramer said to me, 'What are we going to do?' I said, 'Stanley, send those two people home. I will play the scene against two empty chairs. I don't want them here because I can't handle that kind of company.' He sent them home. I played the scene in close-up against two empty chairs as the dialogue coach read Mr. Tracy's and Miss Hepburn's lines from off camera."

Against the backdrop of racial tensions in the United States at the time of the film's production, Poitier felt he was "under close observation" by both Tracy and Hepburn during their first dinner meetings prior to production. However, he managed to swiftly win them over. Due to Tracy and Hepburn's close history with Kramer, Poitier later wrote that Hepburn and Tracy came to regard him with "the kind of respect they had for Kramer, and they had to say to themselves (and I'm sure they did), this kid has to be pretty okay, because Stanley is nuts about working with him".

== Variant versions ==
The original version of the film contained a moment in which Tillie responds to the question "Guess who's coming to dinner now?" with the sarcastic one-liner: "The Reverend Martin Luther King?" After King's assassination on April 4, 1968, this line was removed from the film, so by August 1968, almost all theaters' showings of this film had this line omitted. As early as 1969, the line was restored to many but not all prints, and the line was preserved in the VHS and DVD versions of the film, as well.

== Release ==
Guess Who's Coming to Dinner opened in New York City on December 11, 1967, followed by a wide release in the United States the following day. The film was released on VHS in October 1986 and on DVD on May 22, 2001, with a 40th-anniversary DVD release on February 12, 2008. It was released on Blu-ray on February 7, 2017, to commemorate the film's 50th anniversary.

The film was first shown on U.S. television on CBS on September 19, 1971, and was the highest-rated film broadcast that year with a rating of 26.8 and an audience share of 44%.

== Reception ==
Upon the film's release, New York Times critic Bosley Crowther praised the performances and called the film "a most delightfully acted and gracefully entertaining film, fashioned much in the manner of a stage drawing-room comedy." Crowther wrote that the questions raised by the film should be set aside as they "will only tend to disturb the euphoria and likely enjoyment of this witty and glistening film." In the New York Daily News, critic Wanda Hale gave the film a full four-star rating, and said it "must be counted as an important contribution to motion pictures. With fearless directness Stanley Kramer takes a fresh and risky topic, inter-racial marriage, deals with it boldly and lets the criticisms fall where they may. At the Victoria and Beekman Theaters, the Columbia picture evidences Kramer's uncanny ability in selecting the right cast to portray the characters created by William Rose, to speak the author's penetrating lines as they should, naturally, humorously, bitterly and in the case of Spencer Tracy, simply and eloquently. Tracy, Katharine Hepburn and Katharine Houghton appear as the white people in this problem. Negroes are played by Sidney Poitier, Beah Richards, Isabel Sanford and Roy E. Glenn Sr. But withal, 'Guess Who's Coming to Dinner' is the late great actor's picture and he dominates it with his vitality and the clarity and logic of his presentation." Writing in the Los Angeles Times, film critic Charles Champlin lauded the film as "a deeply moving film, guaranteed to leave no eye undamp." Clifford Terry, film critic of the Chicago Tribune at the time, wrote that the film "examines a theme of the 1960s thru a style of the 1930s. The subject of interracial marriage was probed four years ago in 'One Potato, Two Potato (film),' but Producer-Director Stanley Kramer has reached back long before that for his modus operandi, coming up with the antiseptic slickness and unabashed sentiment [not necessarily a bad thing] in the generic tradition of the Frank Capra social comedy-drama." Roger Ebert, his rival at the Chicago Sun-Times, gave the film a full four-star rating. He said "yes, there are serious faults in Stanley Kramer's 'Guess Who's Coming to Dinner,' but they are overcome by the virtues of this delightfully old-fashioned film. It would be easy to tear the plot to shreds and catch Kramer in the act of copping out. But why? On its own terms, this film is a joy to see, an evening of superb entertainment."

Martin Knelman of the Toronto Daily Star said that "Stanley Kramer has bucked the trend in at least one respect: Instead of choosing to have a title song written specially for Guess Who's Coming to Dinner, the film that arrives today at the Carlton, he has selected an old, familiar song as his theme. Kramer himself told me the other day that he is not wildly enthusiastic about the song, but as far as I'm concerned, it's a perfect touch. The Glory of Love (performed by nightclub singer Jacqueline Fontaine) richly echoes the naive sentimentalism of the pop culture of the 1940s and 1950s and though it's a thoroughly modern picture in some respects, Guess Who's Coming to Dinner is at heart a nostalgic throwback to that era." Joan Irwin of the Montreal Star called it "a strong honest and remarkably sensitive film dealing with the problem of interracial marriage. Every prejudice and argument for and against such a marriage is examined with candor and often with humor, not in a general, preachy context, but as it relates to the two particular people in question. This is no harangue on the subject of indiscriminate brotherly love, nor yet a sentimental treatment of a very real problem. It is a fine film, full of strength and tenderness, played with great subtlety and wit by an entirely superb cast." Jacob Siskind of the rival Gazette newspaper called it "one film that no one should miss. It is unashamedly, unabashedly sentimental; it is designed to tug at your heart strings; it quite obviously makes a play for the largest possible audience. But it does so honestly."

Guess Who's Coming to Dinner was a box-office success in 1968 throughout the United States, including in Southern states where it was traditionally assumed that few white filmgoers would want to see any film with black leads. The success of this film challenged that assumption in film marketing. Despite this success, which included numerous film award nominations, Frank Rich of The New York Times wrote in November 2008 that the film was frequently labeled as dated among liberals. Another main point of contention was the fact that Poitier's character, the golden future son-in-law, had no flaws and a résumé of good deeds. Many people felt that the dynamic between the Draytons and Poitier's character would have inevitably resulted in a happily-ever-after film ending because Poitier's character was so perfect, respectable, likable, and proper. Some people went as far as saying Prentice was "too white" not to be accepted by the Draytons. It was also criticized by some for these reasons at the time, with African-American actor Stepin Fetchit saying that the film "did more to stop intermarriage than to help it." Kramer's intention of the film was to debunk stereotypes placed against people of color, but some scholars argue that it created new stereotypes in its portrayal.

In a 1986 review of the film by The New York Times, Lawrence Van Gelder wrote: "the suspicion arises that were the film made today its makers would come to grips a good deal more bluntly with the problems of intermarriage. Still, this remains a deft comedy and – most of all – a paean to the power of love." In his 1967 review of the film, Champlin wrote "questions do arise" about the treatment of intermarriage, which he observed was "made palatable to the greatest number" by creating a "comfortably old-fashioned picture." Champlin pointed to the extraordinary stature of the Poitier character, and said that he was left with a "nagging uneasiness that the problem has not really been confronted or solved, but only patronized."

On the review aggregator website Rotten Tomatoes, the film holds an approval rating of 71% based on 38 reviews, with an average rating of 6.6/10. The website's critics consensus reads, "More well-intentioned than insightful in its approach to interracial marriage, Guess Who's Coming to Dinner succeeds thanks to the fizzy chemistry of its star-studded ensemble." On Metacritic, the film has an average score of 63 out of 100 based on 13 reviews, indicating "generally favorable reviews".

=== Accolades ===
Award	Category	Recipient(s)	Result
Academy Awards	Best Picture	Stanley Kramer	Nominated
Academy Awards	Best Director	Stanley Kramer	Nominated
Academy Awards	Best Actor	Spencer Tracy (Note: Posthumous nomination.)	Nominated
Academy Awards	Best Actress	Katharine Hepburn	Won
Academy Awards	Best Supporting Actor	Cecil Kellaway	Nominated
Academy Awards	Best Supporting Actress	Beah Richards	Nominated
Academy Awards	Best Story and Screenplay – Written Directly for the Screen	William Rose	Won
Academy Awards	Best Art Direction	Robert Clatworthy and Frank Tuttle	Nominated
Academy Awards	Best Film Editing	Robert C. Jones	Nominated
Academy Awards	Best Original Song Score or Adaptation Score	Frank De Vol	Nominated
American Cinema Editors Awards	Best Edited Feature Film – Dramatic	Robert C. Jones	Nominated
British Academy Film Awards	Best Actor in a Leading Role	Spencer Tracy (Note: Posthumous nomination.)	Won
British Academy Film Awards	Best Actress in a Leading Role	Katharine Hepburn (Note: Also for The Lion in Winter.)	Won
British Academy Film Awards	Best Screenplay	William Rose	Nominated
British Academy Film Awards	United Nations Award	Stanley Kramer	Won
David di Donatello	Best Foreign Production	Stanley Kramer	Won
David di Donatello	Best Foreign Actor	Spencer Tracy	Won (Note: Tied with Warren Beatty for Bonnie and Clyde)
David di Donatello	Best Foreign Actress	Katharine Hepburn	Won (Note: Tied with Faye Dunaway for Bonnie and Clyde)
Directors Guild of America Awards	Outstanding Directorial Achievement in Motion Pictures	Stanley Kramer	Nominated
Golden Globe Awards	Best Motion Picture – Drama		Nominated
Golden Globe Awards	Best Director – Motion Picture	Stanley Kramer	Nominated
Golden Globe Awards	Best Actor in a Motion Picture – Drama	Spencer Tracy	Nominated
Golden Globe Awards	Best Actress in a Motion Picture – Drama	Katharine Hepburn	Nominated
Golden Globe Awards	Best Supporting Actress – Motion Picture	Beah Richards	Nominated
Golden Globe Awards	Best Screenplay – Motion Picture	William Rose	Nominated
Golden Globe Awards	Most Promising Newcomer – Female	Katharine Houghton	Nominated
Karlovy Vary International Film Festival	Crystal Globe	Stanley Kramer	Nominated
Laurel Awards	Top Comedy		Nominated
Laurel Awards	Top Male Dramatic Performance	Spencer Tracy	Nominated
National Film Preservation Board	National Film Registry		Inducted
New York Film Critics Circle Awards	Best Actor	Spencer Tracy	Nominated
Online Film & Television Association Awards	Film Hall of Fame: Productions		Inducted
Writers Guild of America Awards	Best Written American Drama	William Rose	Nominated
Writers Guild of America Awards	Best Written American Original Screenplay	William Rose	Nominated

American Film Institute lists

- AFI's 100 Years...100 Movies – No. 99
- AFI's 100 Years...100 Passions – No. 58
- AFI's 100 Years...100 Cheers – No. 35

== 1975 pilot ==
On May 28, 1975, ABC aired a 30-minute pilot for a proposed comedy television series based on Guess Who's Coming to Dinner, produced and directed by Stanley Kramer and starring Leslie Charleson and Bill Overton.

== See also ==
- List of interracial romance films
- List of American films of 1967
- You People, a 2023 romantic comedy focused on parental approval and interracial marriage
- Get Out
- Guess Who
