= Henry Cornelius =

South African film director (1913–1958)

- Born: 18 August 1913; Cape Town, South Africa
- Died: 2 May 1958 (aged 44); London, England
- Occupations: Film director Film producer Screenwriter; Film editor
- Years active: 1936–1958

Henry Cornelius (born Owen Henry Cornelius 18 August 1913 – 2 May 1958) was a South African-born film director, producer, screenwriter and film editor. He directed five films between 1949 and 1958.

== Biography ==
Born into a German-Jewish family, Cornelius left his native South Africa to work under Max Reinhardt in the Berlin theatrical world. After Adolf Hitler came to power he went to Paris to produce and direct plays until he was selected by René Clair to be an English speaking assistant editor when Clair went to England to make The Ghost Goes West.

Cornelius stayed on with Alexander Korda's London Films to edit several of their classic films such as The Four Feathers and The Lion Has Wings. The start of World War II led him to return to South Africa to be deputy director of the South African Government Film unit where he produced and directed documentaries.

When Cornelius returned to England in 1943, his friend Alberto Cavalcanti brought him to Ealing Studios. Cornelius became an associate producer and screenwriter of several Ealing classics such as Hue and Cry and It Always Rains on Sunday. He made his directing debut with Passport to Pimlico.

The film's success with both the public and the critics led him to ask for a pay rise which Ealing refused. He left Ealing to produce his own film The Galloping Major. That film's failure led Cornelius to return to Ealing studios with the idea for Genevieve. Ealing head Michael Balcon wasn't keen on someone quitting Ealing returning to their fold, but recommended him and his film to be produced by the Rank Organisation.

Cornelius died whilst making Law and Disorder, with the film finished by Charles Crichton.

== Filmography ==
as Director

- Passport to Pimlico (1949)
- The Galloping Major (1951)
- Genevieve (1953)
- I Am a Camera (1955)
- Next to No Time (1958)

as Editor

- The Ghost Goes West (1935, assistant editor)
- Forget Me Not (1936)
- Men Are Not Gods (1936)
- The Drum (1938)
- The Four Feathers (1939)
- The Lion Has Wings (1939)
