= Michael Truman =

British film director, producer and editor (1916–1972)

Michael Truman (25 February 1916, in Bristol, England – 11 July 1972, in Newbury, Berkshire) was a British film producer, director and editor.

Educated at London University, he worked for Ealing Studios editing such films as It Always Rains on Sunday (1947) and Passport to Pimlico (1949) and latterly as producer of films like The Titfield Thunderbolt (1953). As a director, he mainly worked in television on such series as Danger Man.

In November 1956 it was announced he would adapt H.E. Bates' The Jacaranda Tree for Ealing-MGM, about the evacuation of British civilians in Burma. However it appears this film was not made.

== Selected filmography ==
=== Editor ===
- Talking Feet (1937)
- Stepping Toes (1938)
- They Came to a City (1944)
- Johnny Frenchman (1945)
- Pink String and Sealing Wax (1945)
- Bedelia (1946)
- It Always Rains on Sunday (1947)
- Saraband for Dead Lovers (1948)
- Passport to Pimlico (1949)
- A Run for Your Money (1949)

=== Director ===
- Touch and Go (1955)
- Danger Man (1960–1962)
- Go to Blazes (1962)
- The Saint (1962–1969)
- Girl in the Headlines (1963)
- Daylight Robbery (1964)
- Koroshi (1968) TV together with Peter Yates
