= Seth Holt =

Palestinian-born British film director, producer and editor (1923–1971)

- On the set of directorial debut Nowhere to Go (1958)
- Born: 21 July 1923; Mandatory Palestine
- Died: 14 February 1971 (aged 47); London, England
- Occupation: Director - Producer - Editor

Seth Holt (21 July 1923 – 14 February 1971) was a Palestinian-born British film director, producer and editor. His films are characterized by their tense atmosphere and suspense, as well as their striking visual style. In the 1960s, Movie magazine championed Holt as one of the finest talents working in the British film industry, although his output was notably sparse.

== Biography ==
=== Early life ===
Holt was educated at Blackheath School in London. He originally trained as an actor, and spent a term at RADA in 1940 before acting in repertory in Liverpool and Bideford in Devon working with Paul Scofield at the latter venue. His sister, Joan Holt, was married to film director Robert Hamer from the mid-1930s to the mid-1950s.

=== At Ealing Studios ===
In 1942 he joined a documentary film company, Strand, as assistant editor. He worked at Ealing Studios from 1943, at the recommendation of Hamer. He was an editing assistant on films such as Champagne Charlie (1944), The Return of the Vikings (1944), Dead of Night (1945), The Captive Heart (1946), Hue and Cry (1947), Frieda (1947), Scott of the Antarctic (1948), Kind Hearts and Coronets (1949) and Passport to Pimlico (1949).

Holt received his first credit as editor on The Spider and the Fly (1949), made for Mayflower Pictures by Robert Hamer.

Promoted to editor at Ealing, he cut six films for the studio: Dance Hall (1950) and The Lavender Hill Mob (1951), directed by Charles Crichton, His Excellency (1952) for Hamer, Mandy (1952) for Alexander Mackendrick, The Titfield Thunderbolt (1953) and The Love Lottery (1954) for Crichton.

In November 1954, Holt was promoted to producer at Ealing. He worked on Touch and Go (1955), The Ladykillers (1955) with Mackendrick and The Man in the Sky (1957) for Crichton.

Holt graduated to direction with Ealing's penultimate production, Nowhere to Go (1958), which he intended to be "the least Ealing film ever made", co-writing the script with Kenneth Tynan who had been appointed as an Ealing script editor.

=== Interim ===
After Ealing, Holt returned to editing on The Battle of the Sexes (1959) and wrote the script for a short film, Jessy (also 1959). In the Spring 1959 issue of Sight & Sound, he indicated a wish to make Gratz based on a book by J.P. Donleavy but that he also just wanted to practice his craft.

Holt was reportedly responsible for saving Saturday Night and Sunday Morning (1960) and The Entertainer (1960), his last editing credits. Also in this period, he directed episodes of the Danger Man television series for its initial run which were broadcast in 1960 and 1961.

=== Hammer Films mainly ===
His second feature as director was Taste of Fear (US: Scream of Fear, 1961) for Hammer Films, a successful thriller written by Jimmy Sangster and produced by Michael Carreras.

It was followed by Station Six-Sahara (1962), a British-German film shot on location in Libya. British film critic Dilys Powell described it as "true cinema". He did episodes of Espionage.

Holt returned to Hammer to make The Nanny (1965), based on a script by Sangster and starring Bette Davis. It was a huge success and received strong reviews. Pauline Kael called Holt's direction "excellent". Bette Davis, however, once called Holt "the most ruthless director I've ever worked with outside of William Wyler".

=== Later career ===
Holt was contracted to make Danger: Diabolik (1965) in Italy with Gilbert Roland. However filming was abandoned after the producer saw the footage and Holt was fired. The film was later reactivated with another director, Mario Bava. By the mid-1960s, he was involved in developing the script for what became if..... Holt was initially to direct Crusaders, by John Howlett and David Sherwin, the project which became if...., but his health was in such crisis that he passed the project to Lindsay Anderson, who extensively reworked the script with David Sherwin.

Holt directed episodes of Court Martial then made a James Bond-style thriller Danger Route (1967). Holt was reportedly ill during filming.

Holt started directing a film about Monsieur Lecoq with Julie Newmar and Zero Mostel but it too was abandoned. He was the executive producer on Adrian Walker's documentary Barbed Water (1968) which is about the whalers of Faial in the Azores. Filmink opined that Holt seemed to struggle outside the studio system.

In 1970 the National Film Theatre screened a season of his films.

=== Death ===
Hammer Films hired Holt to direct Blood from the Mummy's Tomb (1971). "I haven't been directing because I haven't been offered anything to direct," he said at the time. He said he had been developing scripts about the anarchist Bakunin as well as an adaptation of Lady Into a Fox.

He died on the film's set at Elstree Studios during production from a heart attack five weeks into the six-week shoot, collapsing with cast member Aubrey Morris preventing him from falling, according to Christopher Wicking's obituary in The Guardian. The Times death notice for 16 February states he died peacefully at home. His death is believed to have been alcohol related.

TCM's Ben Mankiewicz says it received better reviews than Hammer's other Mummy movies, which suffered from "The curse of the Mummy Movie," and he gave credit to Holt for the improvement. "He took the wrappings off."

According to one obituary his "unfulfilled career was an indictment of the British film industry".

== Selected filmography ==
- Champagne Charlie (1944) - assistant editor
- The Return of the Vikings (1944) (short feature) - assistant editor
- Dead of Night (1945) - second assistant editor
- The Captive Heart (1946) - second assistant editor
- Hue and Cry (1947) - assistant editor
- Frieda (1947) - assembly cutter
- Scott of the Antarctic (1948) - assembly cutter
- Kind Hearts and Coronets (1949) - assembly cutter
- A Run for Your Money (1949) - assistant editor
- The Spider and the Fly (1949) - editor
- Dance Hall (1950) - editor
- The Lavender Hill Mob (1951) - editor
- His Excellency (1952) - editor
- Crash of Silence aka Mandy (1952) - editor
- The Titfield Thunderbolt (1953) - editor
- The Love Lottery (1954) - editor
- Touch and Go (1955) - associate producer
- The Ladykillers (1955) - associate producer
- Decision Against Time (1957) - associate producer
- Nowhere to Go (1958) - director, writer
- Jessy (1959) (short) - writer
- The Battle of the Sexes (1959) - editor
- Saturday Night and Sunday Morning (1960) - editor
- Danger Man (1960–61) - episodes include "The Key", "The Sisters", "Find and Return", "Under the Lake" - director
- Taste of Fear (1961) - director
- Station Six-Sahara (1962) - director
- Espionage (1963) - episode "The Liberators" - director
- The Nanny (1965) - director
- Danger: Diabolik (1965) - director of film that was abandoned (later filmed and completed by Mario Bava)
- Court Martial (1966) - episodes "Le Belle France", "Savior of Vladik" - director
- Danger Route (1967) - director
- Monsieur Lecoq (1967) - director (unfinished)
- Barbed Water (1969) - associate producer
- Blood from the Mummy's Tomb (1971) - director (unfinished)
