= Ealing comedies =

Ealing Studios films, 1947 to 1957

The Ealing Studios logo as it appears in the opening credits of The Titfield Thunderbolt (1953)

The Ealing comedies is an informal name for a series of comedy films produced by the London-based Ealing Studios between 1947 and 1957. Often considered to reflect Britain's post-war spirit, the most celebrated films in the sequence include Kind Hearts and Coronets (1949), Whisky Galore! (1949), The Lavender Hill Mob (1951), The Man in the White Suit (1951) and The Ladykillers (1955). Hue and Cry (1947) is generally considered to be the earliest of the cycle, and Barnacle Bill (1957) the last, although some sources list Davy (1958) as the final Ealing comedy. Many of the Ealing comedies are ranked among the greatest British films, and they also received international acclaim.

== History ==
In the immediate post-war years there was as yet no mood of cynicism: the bloodless revolution of 1945 had taken place, but I think our first desire was to get rid of as many wartime restrictions as possible and get going. The country was tired of regulations and regimentation, and there was a mild anarchy in the air. In a sense our comedies were a reflection of this mood, a safety valve for our more anti-social impulses.

— Ealing Studios head Michael Balcon, 1969

Relatively few comedy films were made at Ealing Studios until several years after World War II. The 1939 film Cheer Boys Cheer, featuring the rivalry between two brewing companies, one big and modernist, the other small and traditional, has been characterised as a prototype of later films. One of the few other films that can be seen as a direct precursor to the Ealing comedies is Saloon Bar (1940), in which the regulars of a public house join forces to clear the name of the barmaid's boyfriend who has been accused of murder. Other wartime comedies featuring actors such as Tommy Trinder, Will Hay and George Formby were generally in a broader music hall tradition and had little in common with the later Ealing comedy films. Ealing made no comedy films at all in 1945 and 1946.

=== Comedies ===
T. E. B. Clarke wrote the screenplay for Hue and Cry (1947), about a group of schoolboys who confront a criminal gang, which proved to be a critical and commercial success. It was followed by three films with Celtic themes: Another Shore (1948), about the fantasies of a bored Dublin customs official, A Run for Your Money (1949), depicting the adventures of two inexperienced Welshmen in London for an important rugby international, and Whisky Galore!, (1949) about Scottish islanders during the Second World War who discover that a freighter with a large cargo of whisky has run aground.

Kind Hearts and Coronets (1949) is a black comedy in which the son of an impoverished branch of the aristocratic D'Ascoyne family murders eight other members, all of whom are played by Alec Guinness, in order to inherit the family dukedom and gain revenge on his snobbish relations. In Passport to Pimlico (1949), a newly uncovered mediaeval charter causes the inhabitants of the London neighbourhood of Pimlico to create their own independent nation state and end rationing, leading to a variety of unexpected problems and diplomatic incidents with the British government.

The Magnet (1950), set in Liverpool, is about a boy whose acquisition of a magnet leads to a series of adventures in the city. In The Lavender Hill Mob (1951) a timid bank clerk gets together an unlikely gang of accomplices to snatch a delivery of gold bullion. The armed robbery proves surprisingly successful, but things start to go wrong when they attempt to melt down their haul into model Eiffel Towers. The Man in the White Suit (1951) features the efforts of a zealous young scientist to create a new kind of clothing material that will never get dirty and never wear out – an invention that threatens the livelihoods of both big business and the trade unions who join forces to try to prevent the publication of this new discovery.

The Titfield Thunderbolt (1953) echoes the theme of Passport to Pimlico, switched to a rural setting, with a small community standing up for their local interests when their branch line is threatened with closure by British Railways in a forerunner of the Beeching cuts a decade later. The villagers join forces to keep their railway running, but face competition and sabotage from a rival bus company.

Meet Mr. Lucifer (1953) follows a television set as it is passed on from one owner to another, causing dissatisfaction wherever it goes. The film serves as a warning about the effects of rapidly expanding television use.

The Love Lottery (1954) sees a matinee idol Hollywood star, played by David Niven, agree to take part in a "love lottery". The Maggie (1954) features a clash of culture and wills between a wily Scottish boat captain and a vigorous American business tycoon who has mistakenly contracted the boat to carry a cargo for him. In The Ladykillers (1955) a gang of criminals rent a room from the elderly Mrs Wilberforce while they're pretending to be a string quintet looking for a space to practice. They plan to use the house to stage a robbery at nearby King's Cross railway station. On the brink of escape, they are thwarted by Mrs Wilberforce who discovers their true purpose. The gang agree that she has to be murdered before she can go to the police, but prove incapable of doing this, and begin turning on each other instead.

=== Later comedies ===
Who Done It? (1956) was the final comedy made at Ealing Studios, before it was sold to the BBC. It parodies detective fiction with a young man setting himself up in business as a private detective after receiving a windfall of £100. His confused efforts to solve a crime lead to his becoming entangled in Cold War espionage. The film was closer in style to traditional 1930s comedy, rather than the type of films Ealing had become known for over the previous decade.

Two final comedies were released under the Ealing banner, but made at Elstree Studios. Barnacle Bill (1957) follows Captain Ambrose who, after leaving the navy, buys a run-down pier on the English seaside. Ambrose tries to revive the pier crossing swords with the local council who have a scheme to redevelop the entire seafront, personally enriching themselves while ruining him. Ambrose battles them by severing his connection with the shore, registering his pier as a ship under a foreign flag, and marketing it as a tourist destination for those too seasick to go on cruises. In Davy (1958) a promising entertainer tries to decide whether to strike out on his own, or stay with his family's struggling music hall act. No further comedies were made by Ealing, and after the thriller Siege of Pinchgut (1959), the brand was absorbed into the wider Rank Organisation. The previous year Rank had released Rockets Galore!, a sequel to Whisky Galore!, but its production was unconnected with Ealing.

=== Personnel ===
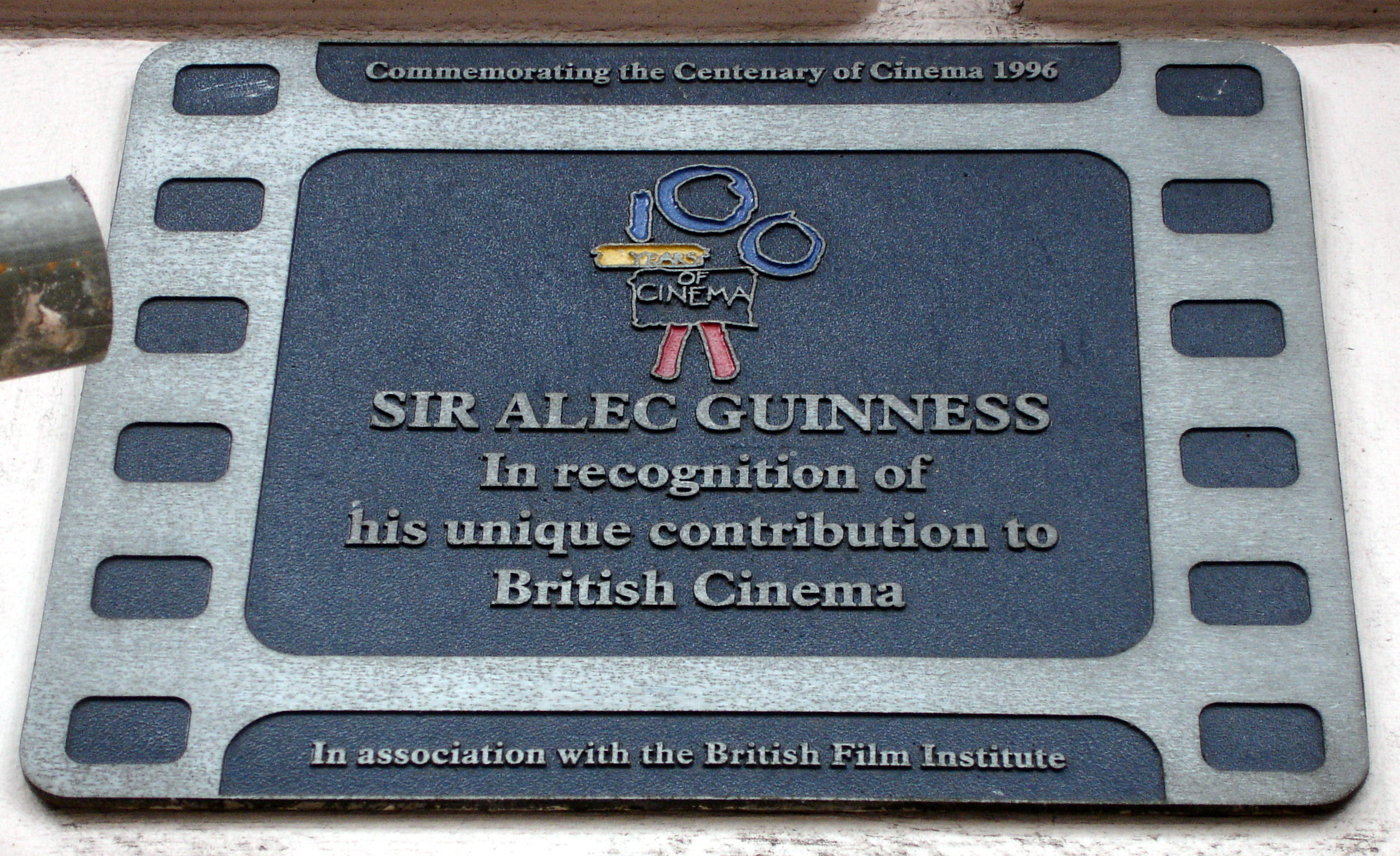
This plaque for Sir Alec Guinness, who starred in six Ealing comedies, was installed by the British Film Institute in London in recognition of his contribution to British cinema.

Many of the films were built around a repertory group of actors, screenwriters, directors and technicians. Directors were Alexander Mackendrick, Charles Crichton, Robert Hamer, Charles Frend, Michael Relph and Henry Cornelius. Composers included Ernest Irving and Georges Auric. Notable actors who became prolific in these films included Stanley Holloway, Alec Guinness, Joan Greenwood, Cecil Parker, Moira Lister and Peggy Cummins. A number of actors also appeared frequently in smaller roles such as Edie Martin and Philip Stainton. In what was his first major film role, Peter Sellers starred opposite Alec Guinness in The Ladykillers. In Kind Hearts and Coronets Guinness had played multiple roles (which Sellers would later emulate). Sellers stated that during filming he "used to watch Alec Guinness do everything, his rehearsals, his scenes, everything. He is my ideal... and my idol."

== Legacy ==
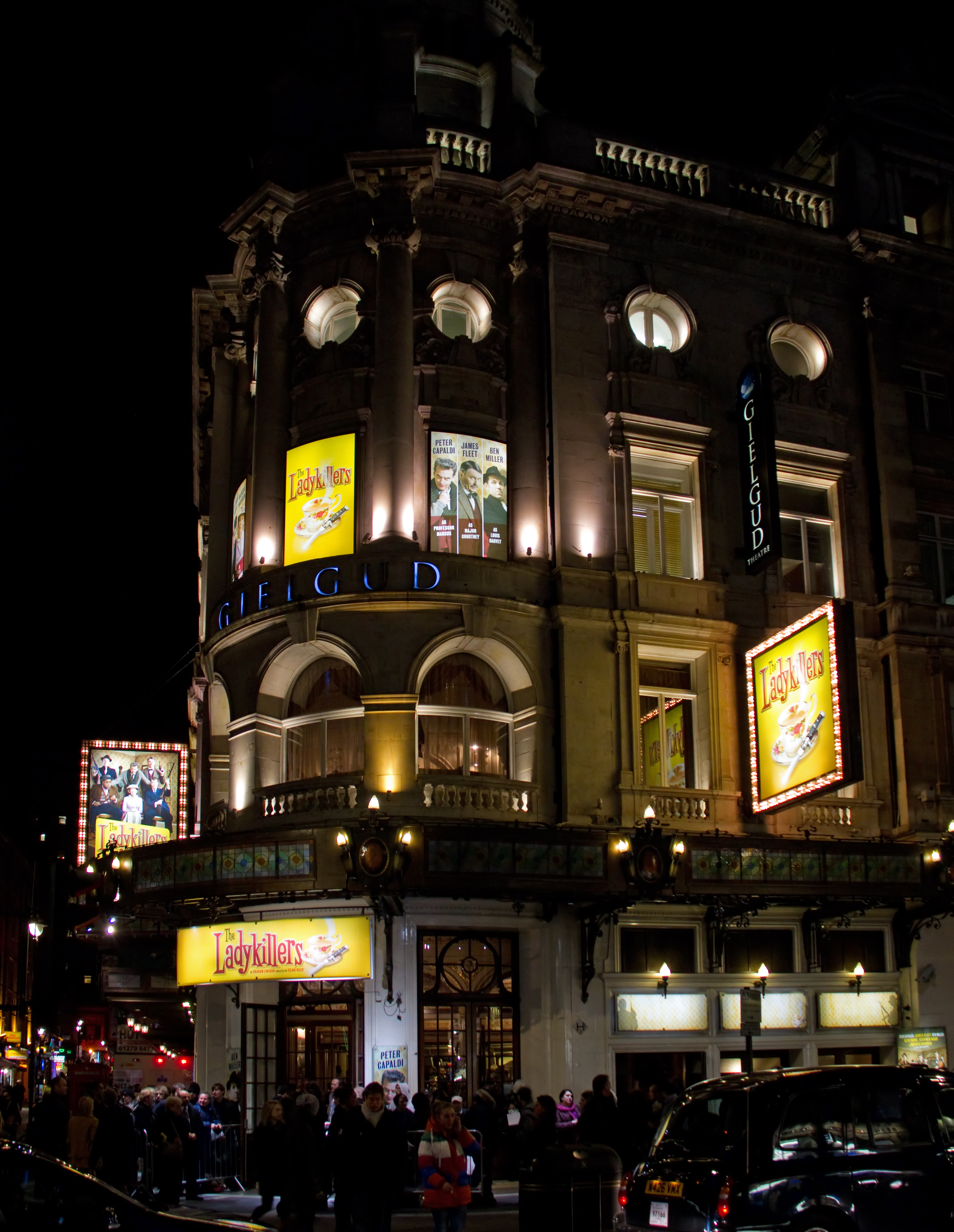
Stage adaptation of The Ladykillers playing at the Gielgud Theatre in London's West End, 2011

Though Ealing Studios has come to be remembered for its comedies, they were only a tenth of its productions. Conversely, Gainsborough Pictures is associated with the Gainsborough melodramas though it also produced many comedies.

Many of the Ealing comedies are ranked among the greatest British films, with Kind Hearts and Coronets ranked number 6, The Ladykillers ranked number 13 and The Lavender Hill Mob ranked number 17 (all three featuring Alec Guinness) in the BFI Top 100 British films. These films were also an international success and received acclaim in the US. In 2005, Kind Hearts and Coronets was included in Time's list of the top 100 films since 1923. The Ladykillers won the BAFTA Award for Best British Screenplay and was nominated for an Academy Award for Best Original Screenplay. The Lavender Hill Mob won the Academy Award for Best Writing, Story and Screenplay, the BAFTA Award for Best British Film, and Guinness was nominated for the Academy Award for Best Actor in a Leading Role (his first Oscar nomination). Former North Korea leader Kim Jong Il was also said to have been a fan of Ealing comedies, inspired by their emphasis on team spirit and a mobilised proletariat.

The Ealing Comedies, a documentary examining the films and featuring interviews with many key players, was screened as part of BBC1's Tuesday Documentary strand in April 1971.

Ealing comedies were adapted for radio and broadcast over BBC Radio 4, including Kind Hearts and Coronets in 1990 starring Robert Powell and Timothy Bateson and in 2007 starring Michael Kitchen and Harry Enfield.

== List of Ealing comedy films ==
- Hue and Cry (1947)
- Another Shore (1948)
- Passport to Pimlico (1949)
- Whisky Galore! (1949)
- Kind Hearts and Coronets (1949)
- A Run for Your Money (1949)
- The Magnet (1950)
- The Lavender Hill Mob (1951)
- The Man in the White Suit (1951)
- His Excellency (1952)
- The Titfield Thunderbolt (1953)
- Meet Mr. Lucifer (1953)
- The Love Lottery (1954)
- The Maggie (1954)
- Touch and Go (1955)
- The Ladykillers (1955)
- Who Done It? (1956)
- Barnacle Bill (1957)
- Davy (1958)

== Bibliography ==
- Burton, Alan & O'Sullivan, Tim. The Cinema of Basil Dearden and Michael Relph. Edinburgh University Press, 2009.
- Murphy, Robert. Realism and Tinsel: Cinema and Society in Britain 1939–48. Routledge, 1992.
- Sweet, Matthew. Shepperton Babylon: The Lost Worlds of British Cinema. Faber and Faber, 2005.
