= Nowhere to Go (1958 film) =

1958 British crime film by Seth Holt

- Theatrical release poster
- Directed by: Seth Holt
- Written by: Kenneth Tynan; Seth Holt
- Based on: Nowhere to Go: A Novel by Donald MacKenzie
- Produced by: Michael Balcon; Eric Williams
- Starring: George Nader; Maggie Smith; Bernard Lee; Geoffrey Keen
- Cinematography: Paul Beeson
- Edited by: Harry Aldous
- Music by: Dizzy Reece
- Production company: Ealing Studios
- Distributed by: Metro-Goldwyn-Mayer
- Release date: 4 December 1958
- Running time: 89 minutes
- Country: United Kingdom
- Language: English
- Budget: $468,000
- Box office: $460,000

Nowhere to Go is a 1958 British crime film directed by Seth Holt in his directorial debut. It stars George Nader, Maggie Smith (receiving her first screen credit), Bernard Lee, Harry H. Corbett and Bessie Love. It was written by Kenneth Tynan and Holt, based on the 1956 novel of the same title by Donald MacKenzie.

A criminal escapes from jail and attempts to recover his stashed loot but is shunned by the criminal community and hunted by the police.

Holt called Nowhere to Go "the least Ealing film ever made." Michael Balcon, head of Ealing, later said the film "went wrong in treatment. A bit pretentious. But was it worth doing? Of course! It gave a young director, Seth Holt, his first chance: that's always on the credit side."

== Plot ==
Paul Gregory, a Canadian confidence trickster operating in London, targets a wealthy Canadian woman in Britain to sell her collection of valuable coins. After meeting her at an ice hockey match, he sets about winning her confidence until she is prepared to grant him legal control over the sale. He completes the deal without her knowledge, stores the money from the sale in a safe deposit box and then deliberately waits to be caught by the police. Gregory plans on receiving a five-year sentence, with time off for good behaviour, and then collecting his loot when he is released.

However, the judge makes an example of the uncooperative Gregory by sentencing him to ten years in prison. While incarcerated, Gregory pays his associate Victor Sloane to help him escape. Almost immediately, things begin to go wrong. Fearing arrest, he is unable to recover the money from the safe. Sloane demands all the money and threatens violence, and Gregory is forced to retaliate.

Gregory tries to procure assistance from his fellow criminals, calling upon an established code that exists among them. But when Sloane is found dead, having accidentally choked on his false teeth due to a gag that Gregory placed in his mouth, they refuse to offer him any assistance, as he is now too "warm."

With the manhunt rapidly approaching, Gregory tries to escape with the help of Bridget Howard, a disillusioned ex-débutante and niece of a chief constable. She drives Gregory to a deserted cottage near her family's rural home outside Brecon. While in hiding, he witnesses the police arrive to question Bridget, assumes the worst and flees again. Attempting to steal a farmer's bicycle, he is shot in the shoulder. He drives away in a stolen lorry but crashes and loses consciousness, and he is found by another farmer. Bridget tells the police nothing as she waits in vain for Gregory at the cottage before walking into the distance.

== Cast ==
- George Nader as Paul Gregory
- Maggie Smith as Bridget Howard
- Bernard Lee as Victor Sloane, alias Lee Henderson
- Geoffrey Keen as Inspector Scott
- Bessie Love as Harriet P. Jefferson
- Harry H. Corbett as Sullivan (credited as Harry Corbett)
- Andrée Melly as Rosa, Irish nightclub waitress
- Harry Locke as George Bendel
- Howard Marion-Crawford as Mack Cameron, club owner
- Arthur Howard as First Mr. Dodds
- John Welsh as Second Mr. Dodds
- Noel Howlett as Uncle Tom Howard
- Christopher Hunter as child
- Lionel Jeffries as shopkeeper
- Glyn Houston as box office clerk
- Lily Kann as Anna Berg
- Maggie Rennie as Mary
- Charles Price as tractor driver
- John Turner as policeman
- Oliver Johnston as Mr. Hopkins, vault official
- Beckett Bould as gamekeeper
- Lane Meddick as Welsh garageman

== Production ==
The film was based on the 1956 debut novel Nowhere to Go (U.S. title: Manhunt) by Donald MacKenzie, a former prisoner. The Manchester Guardian wrote that "the reader is swept along until the very last page." The New York Times described it as "highly rewarding".

Nowhere to Go was produced at MGM-British Studios in Borehamwood but was released under the Ealing Studios banner. Ealing had moved to the Borehamwood studios following the sale of its own studio base in 1955.

In December 1956, Ealing listed Nowhere to Go among a slate of movies planned for the following year in conjunction with MGM; others included Davy (1958) and Dunkirk (1958). Harry Watt was originally scheduled to direct the film, but he was reassigned to The Siege of Pinchgut (1959), which was to be the last Ealing film. Seth Holt, a longtime film editor at Ealing, became the director, and he was the last major beneficiary of studio head Michael Balcon's policy of promoting from within.

The script was cowritten by Kenneth Tynan, who worked at Ealing for two years. This was the only script of his to be filmed while there. He wrote the script with Holt, who said "I did the action bits and he did the dialogue." Holt said that when writing, "I was determined that if we had a criminal as a central figure then we would not have this element of self pity that was so prevalent in those days."

George Nader appeared in the film just after his long-term contract with Universal had ended. He arrived in London on 3 December 1957.

Maggie Smith was a rising stage star and one of 11 artists under contract to Ealing.

Holt said: "I was very anxious to make something rather stylish." He also said that Balcon was very supportive, although "in the end he ratted on me slightly by agreeing with MGM to cut out a quarter of an hour of the film. It might not have been a mistake, I don't know. They were good sequences that went. One was with Lily Kahn; one was with a girl that plays his wife in a flashback to her visit to prison. They were good acting sequences. The visit to prison is a very good scene, utterly flat and miserable. On the other hand I must confess you don't have to have it."

== Release ==
Nowhere to Go was the first Ealing film under the MGM arrangement not to receive a standalone release. Instead, MGM trimmed the film to a length of 89 minutes and released it in the UK on the bottom half of a double bill with the World War II submarine drama Torpedo Run (1958). The pairing premiered in the West End on 4 December 1958 at Fox's Rialto Theatre rather than one of MGM's two West End outlets. A UK general release began on the ABC circuit from 11 January 1959.

== Reception ==
=== Critical ===
The Monthly Film Bulletin wrote: "Perhaps the main weakness of this film is the inability of its writers and director to decide which aspects of their story are of major importance. Faithfully adapted from Donald MacKenzie's novel, the script's early stages include much sharply detailed "business" (the prison escape, Greg's planning of the robbery, his efforts to outwit his partner) which is then superseded by various melodramatic plot twists and an attempt to "interpret" the characters' motives. But the style is too derivative (there are echoes of the fashionable American and French crime schools with their jazzy sound-tracks) so that, apart from one short discussion in a car, there is no sharp awareness of the inner criminal world as in The Asphalt Jungle [1950], for instance. And the "black" ending (strangely unfamiliar in the British cinema) is made invalid by the film's general lack of involvement with the two main characters. Seth Holt, in his first film as director, draws resourcefully on his experience in the cutting rooms, at the same time supplying his players with some awkward, near pretentious dialogue."

Sight & Sound wrote that the film "looked decidedly promising. In fact it is a failure, though neither negligible nor unintelligent; and the reasons for failure are themselves revealing ... it never quite makes up its mind about its central character, presenting him at one moment as an enemy of society, then sentimentalising over him as a fugitive and victim; and it provides scarcely a shred of plausible motivation for the girl ... a picture which often lets its story slide while it fills in background detail."

In British Sound Films: The Studio Years 1928–1959 David Quinlan rated the film as "good", writing: "Thriller is bleak, but remains watchable."

Filmink called it "splendid".

David Thomson later called the film "a cool, supremely visual thriller that in terms of its minimal dialogue and daring narrative playfulness is closer to the world of Jean-Pierre Melville than to any British precedents."

=== Box office ===
According to MGM records, the film earned $145,000 in the U.S. and Canada and $450,000 elsewhere, resulting in a loss of $242,000.

Director Seth Holt said that after the film came out, "I was out on my ear and didn't get any work at all for a long time ... Nowhere to Go dropped like a stone. I like to think, if it had been about two years later, people would have noticed it." He returned to editing for several years until an executive at Hammer Film Productions who had liked Nowhere to Go hired him for Taste of Fear (1961).

== Home media ==
Originally edited down as part of a double bill, the full-length version of Nowhere to Go was released on DVD in January 2013.
