= The Love Lottery =

1954 film

- Original UK film poster
- Directed by: Charles Crichton
- Written by: Harry Kurnitz; Monja Danischewsky
- Story by: Charles Neilson Gattey; Zelma Bramley Moore
- Produced by: Michael Balcon; Monja Danischewsky
- Starring: David Niven; Peggy Cummins; Anne Vernon; Herbert Lom
- Cinematography: Douglas Slocombe
- Edited by: Seth Holt
- Music by: Benjamin Frankel
- Production company: Ealing Studios
- Distributed by: General Film Distributors
- Release date: 28 January 1954
- Running time: 89 minutes
- Country: United Kingdom
- Language: English

The Love Lottery is a 1954 British comedy film directed by Charles Crichton and starring David Niven, Peggy Cummins, Anne Vernon and Herbert Lom. Produced by Ealing Studios it was one of several Ealing Comedies that veered away from the standard formula. The film examines celebrity and fan worship with an international setting including Lake Como, ambitious dream sequences, and an uncredited cameo appearance at the end by Humphrey Bogart as himself.

It was shot in Technicolor. Interiors were shot at Ealing in West London with location shooting around Como in Italy standing in for the fictional town of Tremaggio. The film's sets were designed by the art director Thomas N. Morahan and the costumes by Anthony Mendleson. It was released by General Film Distributors as part of a long-standing agreement with Ealing.

Crichton said "it wasn't successful. I quite liked it. Perhaps it was too much a whimsy whamsy thing."

== Plot ==
A celluloid heart-throb, who is haunted by dreams and hounded by fans, is manipulated by a gambling syndicate into being the prize in a lottery to find him a wife. But things get complicated when he falls in love before the lottery is drawn.

== Cast ==
- David Niven as Rex Allerton
- Peggy Cummins as Sally
- Anne Vernon as Jane Dubois
- Herbert Lom as André Amico
- Charles Victor as Jennings
- Gordon Jackson as Ralph
- Felix Aylmer as Winant
- Hugh McDermott as Rodney Wheeler
- Stanley Maxted as Oliver Stanton
- June Clyde as Viola
- John Chandos as Gulliver Kee, Chinaman
- Theodore Bikel as Parsimonious
- Sebastian Cabot as Suarez
- Eugene Deckers as Vernet
- Andreas Malandrinos as Fodor
- Nicholas Stuart as American Radio Announcer
- Michael Ward as Hotel Receptionist
- Helena Pickard as Sally's Mother
- Marcel Poncin as Priest
- Alexis Chesnakov as The Russian Man
- Nelly Arno as the Russian woman
- Gabrielle Blunt as Doreen
- Mark Baker as Maxie
- John Glyn-Jones as Prince Boris
- Hattie Jacques as Chambermaid
- Michael Craig as Cameraman Assistant
- Alvar Liddell as Himself
- Humphrey Bogart as Himself

== Release ==
The film was first shown at the Regent Theatre in Christchurch, New Zealand on 21 January 1954, as a royal performance during the New Zealand visit by Queen Elizabeth and the Duke of Edinburgh. The UK premiere was at the Gaumont Haymarket in London on 28 January 1954.

== Critical reception ==
The reviewer for The Times expressed mixed views after the UK premiere: "The construction of The Love Lottery is deplorably weak ... and Mr. Charles Crichton, who directs the film for Ealing Studios, is left to make what he can of an idea which could branch out in a number of directions. ... Yet, even if catches are dropped, there is much in The Love Lottery which beguiles and entertains, The satire at the expense on film publicity methods and of the mentality of the film-fan is, in the Ealing tradition, so mild that a writer such as Mr. Clifford Odets would not recognize that it was there, but it is there, nevertheless, and it scores some palpable, if gentle, hits."

Variety said "Ealing Studios, which had a run of major boxoffice hits, via a string of outstanding comedies, lately has been trying its hand at satire with less conspicuous results. . This time it is a try at satirizing Hollywood’s star system. But this basically amusiqg idea gets bogged down by super-clever treatment w'hich will probably misfire with most types of audience."

Michael Balcon called it one of the worst movies made at Ealing. Many years later, the American edition of the TV Guide gave the film two out of four stars, calling it a "clever British satire on the Hollywood star system."
