= Lease of Life =

1954 film by Charles Frend

- UK release poster
- Directed by: Charles Frend
- Written by: Eric Ambler; Frank Baker; Patrick Jenkins
- Produced by: Michael Balcon
- Starring: Robert Donat; Kay Walsh; Adrienne Corri; Denholm Elliott
- Cinematography: Douglas Slocombe
- Edited by: Peter Tanner
- Music by: Alan Rawsthorne
- Production company: Ealing Studios
- Distributed by: General Film Distributors
- Release date: 19 October 1954
- Running time: 94 minutes
- Country: United Kingdom
- Language: English

Lease of Life is a 1954 British drama film directed by Charles Frend and starring Robert Donat, Kay Walsh, Adrienne Corri and Denholm Elliott. It was made by Ealing Studios.The film was designed as a star vehicle for Donat in his return to the screen after a three-year absence.

== Plot ==
Rev. William Thorne is the vicar of the village of Hinton St. John, living with his wife Vera and his daughter Susan, a gifted pianist who receives guidance from Martin Blake. Although the church is the focus of the local community, the Thornes live a frugal life and struggle financially. Vera lives vicariously through her daughter, determined to ensure that Susan's talent is not wasted. However the Thornes cannot afford to pay for Susan's accommodations in London if she wins a scholarship.

Local elderly farmer Mr. Sproatley asks Thorne to visit his sick bed. Sproatley wants his son, and not his wife, to inherit his money when he dies. He is about to entrust Rev. Thorne with the cash when Sproatley's wife enters and the plan is abandoned.

While working on a sermon, Thorne collapses in his library. His doctor informs him that he has less than a year to live. He visits Gilchester Cathedral to contemplate and the cathedral's organ music rings in his head on the bus ride home. Back in town, two women discuss the sexton Mr. Spooner's drunkenness and Rev. Thorne promises to deal with him appropriately.

Thorne returns to Sproatley and takes a leather case containing a will and large amount of cash, but Sproatley's wife challenges him.

Thorne reevaluates his life and those of his parishioners, and he finds himself happier than before. He adopts a tolerant attitude to the minor indiscretions of his parishioners and ignores the village gossip.

At a boys' school to deliver a speech, Thorne tears his prepared notes in and delivers an improvised sermon about disobeying rules and enjoying life. The boys love the sermon, but the dean, headmaster and assembled parents consider it rebellious. A reporter prints the story and word spreads. Thorne's congregation swells, but he knows that many of the new members are merely seeking sensationalism.

Thorne feels free to speak honestly about his beliefs and demonstrates to his parishioners that religion is not a matter of blind adherence to a fixed set of rules, but a freedom to act according to one's conscience. However, some of his words are misunderstood and deemed provocative and controversial.

There also remains the worry about how to secure the necessary funds to pay for Susan's tuition at a music college, and fate happens to put temptation in the way.

When Sproatley dies, Thorne checks the bag of money and finds it £100 short, exactly the amount that Vera had given to Susan, claiming she had sold her jewels. Thorne confronts Vera and she confesses, claiming to have merely borrowed the money. Mrs. Sproatley challenges him about the money in the churchyard after her husband's funeral. Thorne collapses in the church. The reporter who had been covering the story tells Vera that the editor has agreed to pay £100 for Thorne's articles.

Thorne's spirit is revived and he heads to his evening service, stopping to discuss the merits of acting for the living rather than the dead with the gravedigger.

== Cast ==
- Robert Donat as Rev. William Thorne
- Kay Walsh as Vera Thorne
- Adrienne Corri as Susan Thorne
- Denholm Elliott as Martin Blake
- Walter Fitzgerald as the Dean
- Reginald Beckwith as Foley
- Cyril Raymond as headmaster
- Vida Hope as Mrs. Sproatley
- Beckett Bould as Mr. Sproatley
- Jean Anderson as Miss Calthorp
- Russell Waters as Russell
- Alan Webb as Dr. Pembury
- Richard Wattis as solicitor
- Richard Leech as Carter
- Frederick Piper as jeweller
- Mark Daly as Spooner
- Frank Atkinson as verger
- Edie Martin as Miss. Calthorp's Friend (non-speaking)

== Production ==
Exterior sequences for the film were shot in Beverley (East Yorkshire) and the nearby village of Lund (Hinton St. John) in the East Riding of Yorkshire. The railway scenes in the film were filmed at Windsor & Eton Central station. The church scenes were filmed in Beverley Minster, East Yorkshire.

In common with a number of other Ealing films of the era, the film focuses on a specific English milieu, in this case a Yorkshire village and its nearby cathedral city. The film is unique in the Ealing canon in having religion as its dominant theme.

== Reception ==
The Monthly Film Bulletin wrote: "There is no doubt that Lease of Life has its heart in the right place; and the director works hard, too, to establish the Yorkshire village atmosphere. Those with Anglican nostalgias to be satisfied will find some compensation in the church and cathedral interiors, hymns, bells, and parish comings-and-goings. The background, indeed, is more successful than the foreground, for Eric Ambler's screenplay disappoints with its sketchy characterisation and failure to make the humdrum seem anything except humdrum. Vera Thorne, for instance, is not sufficiently developed as a character for her dilemma – the ' borrowing" of the £100 – to make any impact. ... The daughter, as played by Adrienne Corri, is an unlikely figure, and her scenes with Blake the organist are rather embarrassingly novelettish in the writing. One can see, in the basic situation, possible material for a regional slice of life; but the daily round, the common task, need to be transfigured by imagination to make them interesting, and mere plotting – the vicar's illness, Mrs. Thorne's lapse – is no substitute for this. As the vicar, Robert Donat gives an earnest, careful, rather theatrically shaded performance."

Upon the film's American release, critic Bosley Crowther of The New York Times praised Robert Donat's performance but was disappointed with the script: "It is a role charged with selfless devotion to others and to a high ideal, and Mr. Donat imbues it with such fervor and gentle sincerity as to recall his touching performance of the old teacher at an English boys' school. There is about his dying parson an air of fine genteel poverty and quiet decay. Mr. Donat makes the gallant preacher a man to be pitied and admired. However, we fear that Eric Ambler, who wrote the script, has let him down toward the end and permitted the quality of his character to be rather cheaply compromised. ... Mr. Ambler has compelled him to give in to a shabby dodge to save his foolish wife from shame. And he has come to this wretched embarrassment through the melodramatic device of some 'borrowed' money. The whole thing goes fuzzy and quixotic—somewhat like the parson himself—toward the end. It is not a satisfactory climax for a sentimental drama that Mr. Ambler has contrived."

Leslie Halliwell said: "Somewhat depressing but well-acted drama with excellent village atmosphere."

The Radio Times Guide to Films gave the film 3/5 stars, writing: "Thriller specialist Eric Ambler makes a mawkish mess of what is essentially a domestic drama but through the gentle fidelity of his performance, Donat creates a decent and dignified character."

In British Sound Films David Quinlan called the film a "sincere, quiet, close-to-dull drama.''

== Awards ==
Donat was nominated for Best British Actor at the 1955 British Academy Film Awards.
