= Destiny of a Spy =

1969 American television movie

Destiny of a Spy is a 1969 American TV movie directed by Boris Sagal. It premiered on NBC on October 27, 1969, but was released theatrically in some territories outside the US.

It was the first time in eleven years Lorne Greene had played a role other than Ben Cartwright in Bonanza. It was shot in Britain.

The same producer, director and writer reteamed to make The Movie Murderer (1970).

== Cast ==
- Lorne Greene
- Rachel Roberts
- Anthony Quayle
