= Hand in Hand (1961 film) =

1961 film by Philip Leacock

- Poster
- Directed by: Philip Leacock
- Written by: Sidney Harmon; Diana Morgan
- Produced by: Helen Winston
- Starring: Loretta Parry; Philip Needs
- Cinematography: Freddie Young
- Edited by: Peter Tanner
- Music by: Stanley Black
- Color process: Black and white
- Production companies: Associated British Picture Corporation; Helen Winston Productions
- Distributed by: Warner-Pathé Distributors
- Release dates: 7 April 1963 (UK); 6 February 1961 (New York)
- Running time: 78 minutes
- Country: United Kingdom
- Language: English

Hand in Hand (also known as The Star and the Cross) is a 1961 British drama film directed by Philip Leacock and starring Philip Needs, Loretta Parry, John Gregson and Sybil Thorndike. It was written by Sidney Harmon and Diana Morgan.

The film is about the friendship between two young children, one a Roman Catholic boy about nine, the other a 7-year-old Jewish girl.

== Plot ==
Michael O'Malley, rushes to his priest to tearfully inform him that he has accidentally killed his closest friend, Rachel Mathias. The story is told in flashback as Michael recounts their friendship, when he first befriended Rachel by hurrying her away from a group of schoolboys who were verbally bullying her on the playground. They quickly become the best of friends. The young children decide to become "blood brothers" by pricking their fingers and rubbing the blood together. They set off for an adventure, hoping to go to London to visit the queen, but instead are picked up by a kindly elderly lady who takes them to her home for tea, pretending that she is a princess and that her mansion is one of the queen's homes, but that the queen is currently away. Her amiable deception goes over perfectly, and the children have a great time visiting with her.

Michael and Rachel are aware that they worship on different days and their religions are somewhat different, but they do not ponder the specifics. However, when a somewhat overbearing and destructively-outspoken classmate informs Michael that Rachel is Jewish and that "the Jews killed Christ", an outraged Michael rushes to Rachel at their clubhouse and angrily confronts her, "Why did you kill Christ?" Rachel is shocked and insistently denies it: "I didn't kill him. I don't even know him". Michael and Rachel conclude that God is angry at them for becoming friends, but they are not sure if He will forgive them. They decide to attend church with each other to see if God is mad at them, believing they will die if He does not want them to go to each other's church. Michael sneaks into the synagogue with Rachel the next Saturday and is somewhat puzzled and intimidated by the ceremony, but he stays and seems to like it as time goes on, especially after the kindly rabbi shows him a passage in the Torah that speaks of God's love shielding him from all fear. The next day, Rachel goes with Michael to his church, and while Rachel is initially somewhat unnerved by the services and statues, she too feels more comfortable after a while, especially as the Blessed Virgin's gentle expression appeals to her: "It's all right, Mike. The lady likes me."

Having concluded it is acceptable to God that they remain friends, Michael and Rachel decide to take an inflatable raft on the River Thames for their next adventure, a trip to Africa. All goes well at first as Michael paddles and the raft drifts leisurely and makes smooth ripples on the calm water, but then when the duo passes into a dangerous section of the river with a swifter flow and strong rapids, Michael loses control of the raft, and Rachel is knocked overboard. Due to the stronger current and the riverbank's dense underbrush in which Rachel has become entangled, Michael has great difficulty reaching her, but at last pulls her out of the river; however, she is limp and unresponsive. Fearing the worst, Michael frantically rushes to get help, and adults in the area call for an ambulance. The film then returns to the present moment, with Michael in his grief-stricken state, and telling the priest that he's killed Rachel. The priest comforts him and tells him that Rachel may be all right, and then accompanies him to Rachel's home to see how she is. They are met at the front door by Rachel's rabbi who is leaving, and he smilingly informs them that Rachel has pulled through after all and is recovering well, but that perhaps it would be better to wait till tomorrow to visit her. Michael, immensely relieved, rushes home happy that his little friend is still alive, and the priest and the rabbi --- who earlier in the film have been established as being good friends despite their differing religions (just as the Catholic boy Michael and Jewish girl Rachel had become close), and acknowledging that their respective religions actually hold more in common than they may have realized before --- speak warmly to each other before walking away in different directions.

== Cast ==
- Philip Needs as Michael O'Malley
- Loretta Parry as Rachel Mathias
- John Gregson as Father Timothy
- Sybil Thorndike as Lady Caroline
- Finlay Currie as Mr. Pritchard
- Miriam Karlin as Mrs. Mathias
- Arnold Diamond as Mr. Mathias
- Barbara Hicks as Miss Roberts
- Derek Sydney as Rabbi Benjamin
- Denis Gilmore as Tom
- Kathleen Byron as Mrs. O'Malley
- Barry Keegan as Mr. O'Malley
- Madge Ryan as George's wife

== Release ==
Although ABPC's distribution arm in the United Kingdom, Warner-Pathe Film Distributors, screened the film for the British press in late 1960, it remained unreleased in the UK until 1963, when it finally went out nationally on the ABC cinema circuit as the supporting feature for the Tony Hancock comedy The Punch and Judy Man. It was shown to American children and adults when released on the CBS Children's Film Festival 1967 season hosted by Kukla, Fran and Ollie.

== Reception ==
The Monthly Film Bulletin wrote: "The dangers, indeed the nauseating possibilities, inherent in such a plot are only too obvious, and the fact that none of the clichés is avoided makes it all the more remarkable that the film is not offensive. There are some bad moments, of course, but the naiveté, amounting to amateurishness, of the approach has proved its salvation. Its total lack of pretentions allows it to be taken and enjoyed on its own simple level, which is that of a film made by and for small children. As in the Children's Film Foundation productions the adults never really get a look in, although Sybil Thorndike gives good value in her three-minute role. Young Philip Needs as Michael is obviously inexperienced and uncomprehending at times, but Loretta Parry as Rachel is almost alarmingly knowing."

Variety wrote: "The going, fortunately, never gets heavy or too obvious, although there are one or two moments when the film is on the brink of mild overlovableness in its regard of local men of the cloth. Actually, there is an extraordinary amount of humor... In addition to the captivating work of the two youngsters, there are fine performances by John Gregson, Sybil Thorndike, Finlay Currie, Derek Sydney, Miriam Karlin, Arnold Diamond, Kathleen Byron and Barry Keegan. Some of the camera work by F. A. Young is exceptionally sensitive. Editing by Peter Tanner and art direction by Ivan King are major assists, and there is a moving and listenable score by Stanley Black. But it is Leacock's extremely, perceptive direction that gives the pleture its special quality."

== Accolades ==
The film won 14 international film awards including a 1961 Golden Globe Award for Best Film Promoting International Understanding and the children's category at the Venice Film Festival.

Philip Leacock was also nominated for the 1961 Best Achievement in Directing award by the Directors Guild of America.
