= Diana Morgan (screenwriter) =

Welsh playwright and screenwriter (1908–1996)

Mary Diana Morgan Barbour
- Born: Mary Diana Morgan; 29 May 1908; Cardiff, Wales
- Died: 9 December 1996 (aged 88); Northwood, Middlesex, England
- Education: Royal Central School of Speech and Drama
- Occupations: playwright, screenwriter, novelist
- Spouse: Robert MacDermot Barbour (1910–1964)
- Children: 1

Mary Diana Morgan (29 May 1908 – 9 December 1996) was a Welsh playwright, screenwriter and novelist, mostly associated with her work for Ealing Studios as Diana Morgan. She was married to fellow screenwriter Robert MacDermot.

== Career ==
Mary Diana Morgan was born in Cardiff, Wales on 29 May 1908. She studied at the Central School of Speech Training and Dramatic Art. Her London stage debut was in Noël Coward's Cavalcade at the Theatre Royal, Drury Lane in 1931.

On 8 September 1934, she married Robert MacDermot Barbour (born 1910 in Poona, India), who would become Head of BBC TV Drama in 1948. They had a son, Richard Morgan Derry MacDermot Barbour.

After their marriage, they began writing as a partnership. Their early work was for the London stage and included a full revue in 1938 at the London Hippodrome, Black and Blue, starring Frances Day, Vic Oliver and Max Wall.

Morgan and MacDermot were later hired by stage director Norman Marshall, who was impressed with their witty and satirical scripts. Their task was to write a stage show for Hermione Gingold. Although slow to begin, the show was a great success, selling out for its eight-week run.

Morgan and MacDermot would go on to write the stage shows, Lets Face It! (1939) and Swinging the Gate (1940), as well as many revues for the West End and the outlying club theatres. In the 1940s Morgan wrote several plays including a House in the Square (1940) and Rain before Seven (1949).

Also during the 1940s, Morgan made significant script contributions to several Ealing screenplays. She is currently better known for her screenplays than her stage work. A contract writer, her film work included Went the Day Well? (1942) and additional dialogue for A Run for Your Money (1949). In 1960 she scripted Philip Leacock's film Hand in Hand about a Roman Catholic child and his Jewish friend, for which she won several international awards.

Her television work included Emergency – Ward 10 and its spin-off Call Oxbridge 2000, while she also made contributions to radio and wrote two novels: Delia (1974) and Thomas the Fish.

== Death ==
MacDermot died in London on 21 November 1964. Morgan died in Northwood, Middlesex on 9 December 1996, at the age of 88.

== Notable stage work ==
- Bats In The Belfry (1937)
- Transatlantic Lullaby (1939)
- Black & Blue Revue – Frances Day (1939)
- Let's Face it! (1939)
- A House in the Square (1940)
- Three Waltzes (1945)
- My Sex Right or Wrong (1947)
- Swinging the Gate (1950)
- Everyman (1952)
- After my Fashion (1952)
- The Starcross Story (1953)
- I"ll Take the High Road... (1956)
- Your Obedient Servant (1960)
- Rain Before Seven (1960)
- Time to Kill (1961)
- Hand in Hand (1963)
- Little evenings (1971)
- My Cousin Rachel (1980) (based in the novel My Cousin Rachel by Daphne Du Maurier)

== Notable film work ==
- Go to Blazes (short, 1942)
- Went the Day Well? (1943)
- Pink String and Sealing Wax (1945)
- A Run for Your Money (1949)
- Poet's Pub (1949)
- Dance Hall (1950)
- Hand in Hand (1960)
