= Girl on Approval =

1962 British film by Charles Frend

- British theatrical poster
- Directed by: Charles Frend
- Screenplay by: Kathleen White
- Produced by: Harold Orton
- Cinematography: John Coquillon
- Edited by: John Bloom
- Music by: Clifton Parker
- Production company: Eyeline Films
- Distributed by: Bryanston Films (UK)
- Release date: 1962 (US)
- Running time: 75 min
- Country: United Kingdom
- Language: English

Girl on Approval is a 1961 black and white British drama film directed by Charles Frend and starring Rachel Roberts, James Maxwell and Annette Whiteley.

Its budget was £22,494.

== Plot ==
Mr and Mrs Howland arrive at a children's home to collect Sheila, a troublesome 14 year old, who has had several foster parents before. They are taking her "on approval" for the weekend. They already have two children. They are warned that she thinks nobody wants her. We are told her father is unknown and her mother is in prison. They are told not to spoil her. They do not take her immediately. The social worker drives Sheila to their house on a Friday. Sheila tries to jump out of the car while they drive.

Sheila sits annoying the dog and picking a hole in the settee. She calms when they call her a young lady and offer her a sweet. Mrs Howland finds her suitcase packed and coat on in the middle of the night. After a fight she makes her a plate of chips, but he is still unsettled. She says she is not used to sleeping alone... so Mrs Howland joins her.She is allowed to sleep in to 11.30 and given a cup of tea in bed.

Mr Howland gives her a present: a pair of roller skates. She starts calling hem auntie and uncle.

Mrs Howland goes shopping and despite being charming, Sheila wanders off and steals a watch. Mrs Howland returns it. It becomes clear that Sheila's behaviour is a defence mechanism to stop herself getting hurt emotionally. The Howlands ask to keep her extra days. She starts helping a little by bathing the boys.

Mr Howland takes her to see the Treasure of Monte Cristo at the cinema. She moans about the seat. She starts to cause a rift between the couple.

Mr Howland goes to speak to the social worker who sees it as a vicious circle, and fears Sheila will treat her own children badly.

Sheila starts hanging around Mr Howland and Mrs Howland starts getting jealous. They get snappy with each other so Anne wants to send her back. But they persevere.

Mrs Howland takes Sheila for a new hairdo. Sheila gets the scissors and cuts it off. Mrs Howland goes to the social worker who points out that if her own children don't say thank you, why should she expect Sheila to say thank you.

Anne buys Stephen a toy gun. Mr Howland snaps it in half as he disapproves of war toys.

Another fight starts between Anne and Sheila when she refuses to pick up her wet towels in the bathroom. They cannot decide to keep her or let her go.

Sheila disappears on the evening on which she is meant to go. She wanders around at the park and looking at the children's home where she had been.

A man interviews Mrs Howland about he disappearance. Sheila ends up at a chip shop . She observes a courting couple then approaches a strange man. She changes her mind but he follows her. Mr Howland seeks the help of the police. Mr Howland rescues her just in time.

She stays an extra night. In the morning Sheila concludes she is only being tolerated due to the payment from the state.

As Sheila stands at the front door with her case the whistle blows on the kettle and she is asked to stay for tea. Anne gives her the first true hug just as the social worker arrives. But Mr Howland shows her out and they keep Sheila.

== Cast ==
- Rachel Roberts as Anne Howland
- James Maxwell as John Howland
- Annette Whiteley as Sheila
- Ellen McIntosh as Mary Gardner, the social worker
- John Dare as Stephen Howland
- Pauline Letts as Mrs Cox
- Michael Clarke as William Howland

== Critical reception ==
The Monthly Film Bulletin wrote: "Eyeline Films believe it is possible to make good low-budget second features on subjects of real interest, and they have got an admirable case with this one. They had the advantage of a strong, spare script, obviously written with first-hand knowledge of the problems involved, and bravely free of all concessions to sentimentality or facile optimism. It is the sort of affectionate, well-observed picture of lower middle class life that occasionally crops up in television drama, where it must be admitted it often gets more technically assured treatment. Companies like Eyeline might do well to study television techniques, especially with regard to sound recording. But they could hardly have bettered Rachel Roberts' warm, down-to-earth portrayal of Anne. She is splendidly supported by young Annette Whiteley, who manages to convey a glimmer of an attractive and loveable child emerging reluctantly from her sullen defensive shell. Direction and 'supporting cast are uninspired by comparison, but the unpretentious honesty of the whole enterprise deserves every credit. What a pity that a genuinely serious little film should have to labour under such a catchpenny title."

BFI Screenonline called it "a typical social drama of the period".

Robert Shail thought it "added little" to director Charles Frend's reputation;
