= Barnacle Bill (1957 film) =

1957 British film by Charles Frend

- American poster
- Directed by: Charles Frend
- Written by: T. E. B. Clarke
- Produced by: Michael Balcon
- Starring: Alec Guinness
- Cinematography: Douglas Slocombe
- Edited by: Jack Harris
- Music by: John Addison
- Production company: Ealing Studios
- Distributed by: Metro Goldwyn Mayer
- Release date: 11 December 1957
- Running time: 87 minutes
- Country: United Kingdom
- Language: English
- Budget: $659,000
- Box office: $950,000

Barnacle Bill (US title: All at Sea) is a 1957 Ealing Studios comedy film directed by Charles Frend and starring Alec Guinness. It was written by T. E. B. Clarke. Guinness plays an unsuccessful Royal Navy officer and six of his maritime ancestors.

This was the final Ealing comedy, and the last film Guinness made for Ealing Studios.

== Plot ==
William Horatio Ambrose wants desperately to live up to the proud family naval tradition. Ambrose has a debilitating problem however: he suffers from violent seasickness. As a result, his contribution to the Second World War consists of testing cures for the malady. When he retires from the Royal Navy, he purchases a dilapidated late Victorian era amusement pier (the closest thing to a command of his own) with his life savings. The workers are an apathetic bunch, led by the insolent Figg, who quits as soon as the new owner begins imposing some discipline. With the assistance of his new second-in-command, a former RN rating named Tommy, and much hard work with the help of a group of bored local teenagers, Ambrose soon has the pier repaired.

Then he has to deal with the local town council, headed by the crooked Mayor Crowley and the hostile Arabella Barrington, who mistakes him for a Peeping Tom when they first meet. Every time he comes up with an ingenious way to make his business profitable, they see to it that the council outlaws it. When Crowley decides to confiscate and demolish Ambrose's pier and Barrington's bathing huts (under compulsory purchase) to further his own business interests, she resigns from the council and informs Ambrose. He counters by registering his property as a "foreign" naval vessel (christened the Arabella), under the flag of convenience of the easygoing country of "Liberama", which removes it from the town's jurisdiction. He soon attracts many happy, paying passengers for his stationary inaugural "cruise".

Thwarted, Crowley hires Figg to take his dredger and demolish the structure late at night. Using a seasickness remedy suggested by Barrington, Ambrose is able to take to sea and foil the scheme (with his ghostly ancestors watching approvingly), but in the process, part of the pier becomes detached and floats away. He remains aboard to prevent salvagers from claiming it and drifts over to France, where he is hailed as a naval hero.

== Cast ==
- Alec Guinness as Captain William Horatio Ambrose
- Irene Browne as Mrs Barrington
- Maurice Denham as Mayor Crowley
- Percy Herbert as Tommy
- Victor Maddern as Figg
- Allan Cuthbertson as Chailey
- Donald Pleasence as Cashier
- Harold Goodwin as Duckworth
- Richard Wattis as Registrar of Shipping
- Lionel Jeffries as Garrod
- George Rose as Bullen
- Lloyd Lamble as Superintendent Browning
- Harry Locke as Reporter
- Jackie Collins as June
- Eric Pohlmann as Liberamanian Consul
- Joan Hickson as Mrs Kent
- Charles Cullum as Major Kent
- Miles Malleson as Angler
- Charles Lloyd-Pack as Tritton
- Warren Mitchell as Artie White
- Elsie Wagstaff as Mrs Gray
- Sam Kydd as Frogman, "Davy Jones"

== Production ==
Guinness appeared in the film as a favour to the director. In later years, he recalled it as "wretched, (a film) ... I never wanted to do and only did out of friendship to Charley Frend." Although Barnacle Bill was the last Ealing comedy, it was shot at Hunstanton Pier and Elstree Studios, as Ealing Studios had closed and was sold to the BBC for television production.

== Release ==
Barnacle Bill opened at the Empire Cinema in London on the 11 December 1957.

== Reception ==
=== Box office ===
According to MGM records, the film cost $659,000 to make (see budget note 1 above) and earned $405,000 in the US and Canada, plus $545,000 elsewhere, ($950,000). After distribution and associated costs were deducted, the film lost MGM $55,000. Michael Balcon said the film "did well - but then he [Alec Guiness] always does." Kinematograph Weekly, however, claimed Guinness popularity couldn't keep the film's "head above water".

=== Critical ===
The Monthly Film Bulletin wrote: "Barnacle Bill must stand or fall by the resourcefulness with which a promising but simple central situation is developed. Although the mood is throughout iconoclastic, and there are some characteristic jibes at excesses of authority and bureaucracy, the ultimate impression is of a fair joke carried rather beyond its possibilities. Too often mildly malicious satire is uneasily coupled with more conventional slapstick and farce – a miscalculation further emphasised by the occasional hesitancy of Charles Frend's handling. Faced with slender material, Alec Guinness nevertheless brings a delicacy to the part of the guileful innocent Ambrose and, in a series of images which recall Kind Hearts and Coronets [1949], the hero's six absurd ancestors. The rest of the players are restricted to familiar but adequate caricatures. Patchy as it is, and lacking in real bite, Barnacle Bill nevertheless represents a welcome return by Ealing to the type of production which remains the company's happiest territory."

Reviewing the film in The New York Times, Bosley Crowther wrote: "Mr. Clarke's whimsical notion doesn't sail quite the untroubled sea that Mr. Guinness' pier does. It runs into roughness, now and then, which requires rather diligent overacting and farcical behavior by all hands. But Mr. Guinness, who has made an art of underplaying, never goes too far overboard "

The Radio Times Guide to Films gave the film 1/5 stars, writing: "The last of the Ealing comedies, this is a wearisome affair. There are echoes of Kind Hearts and Coronets (with Alec Guinness playing his ancestors in several contrived flashbacks), and the action brims over with eccentric characters who could be refugees from any of the film's more illustrious predecessors. An unfunny and slightly embarrassing bore."

British film critic Leslie Halliwell said: "Quite an amusing comedy which had the misfortune to come at the tag-end of the Ealing classics and so seemed too mild and predictable. Perhaps it was a little staid."

== See also ==
- List of British films of 1957
