= Dance Hall (1950 film) =

1950 British film by Charles Crichton

- Original UK quad format poster
- Directed by: Charles Crichton
- Screenplay by: E.V.H. Emmett; Diana Morgan; Alexander Mackendrick
- Produced by: Michael Balcon associate E.V.H. Emmett
- Starring: Donald Houston; Bonar Colleano; Petula Clark; Natasha Parry; Jane Hylton; Diana Dors
- Cinematography: Douglas Slocombe
- Edited by: Seth Holt
- Music by: Joyce Cochrane; Reg Owen; Jack Parnell
- Production company: Ealing Studios
- Distributed by: GFD (UK)
- Release date: 8 June 1950 (UK)
- Running time: 80 minutes
- Country: United Kingdom
- Language: English
- Budget: £167,749
- Box office: £89,000

Dance Hall is a 1950 British drama film directed by Charles Crichton and starring Donald Houston, Bonar Colleano, Natasha Parry and Petula Clark. The film was an unusual departure for Ealing Studios at the time, as it tells the story about four women and their romantic encounters from a female perspective.

== Plot ==
The storyline centres on four young female factory workers who escape the monotony of their jobs by spending their evenings at the Chiswick Palais, the local dance hall, where they have various problems with their boyfriends.

== Main cast ==
- Donald Houston as Phil
- Bonar Colleano as Alec
- Natasha Parry as Eve
- Petula Clark as Georgie Wilson
- Jane Hylton as Mary
- Diana Dors as Carole
- Gladys Henson as Mrs Wilson
- Sydney Tafler as Jim Fairfax
- Douglas Barr as Peter
- Fred Johnson as Mr Wilson
- James Carney as Mike
- Kay Kendall as Doreen
- Eunice Gayson as Mona
- Dandy Nichols as Mrs Crabtree

== Production ==
Filming took place in November 1949.

Peter Finch was offered a supporting role but did not appear in the final film. It was Donald Houston's second film.

The part of Alec was originally played by Dermot Walsh but he was replaced during filming by Bonar Colleano. "I did feel very cross about that," said Walsh later. "They'd ruined my career in first features."

The film was edited by Seth Holt, who called it "terrible." Actress Diana Dors later called it "a ghastly film – quite one of the nastiest I ever made" although she received positive reviews. Director Charles Crichton later said "it wasn't a picture I particularly wanted to make but was quite interesting." He said the film "didn't do too well" so his career was "sliding" before being "rescued" by The Lavender Hill Mob.

== Music ==
The bands of Geraldo and Ted Heath provide most of the music in the dance hall.

== Release ==
The film premiered on 8 June 1950 at the Odeon Marble Arch in London.

== Reception ==
Some critics felt that the lead actresses were too glamorous for the working-class ladies whom they represented but agreed that Clark, slowly emerging from her earlier children's roles, and Parry, in her screen debut, had captured the spirit of young postwar women clinging to the glamour and excitement of the dance hall.

The Monthly Film Bulletin wrote: "The story is conventional and shapeless, while the sub-plots are merely incidents. The film relies on the presentation of the dance hall for its appeal, but, unfortunately, although the dance hall is made the focus for all activities, it somehow fails to come to life as more than a background for the action, and its various attractions for the girls are hardly suggested. The treatment of the setting, indeed, is deliberately repetitive; each dance hall sequence is introduced by shots of a drummer or trumpeter; the same extras appear, performing energetically, and even in the last scenes, when the distraught Eve wanders among the happy crowds, the contrast between her mood and her surroundings is not imaginatively caught. The film does achieve a certain excitement in the dancing championship, dramatically cut, but the remainder is disappointingly flat."

A review in The Times stated, "[T]he trouble with the film is that the characters do not match the authenticity of the background, and the working girls, who are the heroines, are too clearly girls who work in the studio and nowhere else" and concluded that the film "is not without its interest, but it does not quite live up to the high standards set by the Ealing Studios."

For the BFI, Roger Mellor wrote that the film retains interest as "an historical piece full of incidental detail: visual reminders of London bomb sites and trolleybuses, and references to Mac Fisheries, Music While You Work, football results and rationing."

FilmInk wrote: "Dors is easily the best thing about the film, playing a saucy minx out for a good time, and does not get nearly enough screen time. The film focuses more on the adventures of Parry, Hylton and … Donald Houston."
