= San Demetrio London =

- Original British quad format cinema poster
- Directed by: Charles Frend; Robert Hamer (uncredited)
- Screenplay by: Charles Frend; Robert Hamer; F. Tennyson Jesse
- Produced by: Michael Balcon
- Starring: Arthur Young; Walter Fitzgerald; Ralph Michael
- Cinematography: Ernest Palmer
- Edited by: Eily Boland
- Music by: John D. H. Greenwood
- Production company: Ealing Studios
- Distributed by: Associated British Film Distributors
- Release date: 21 February 1944
- Running time: 97 minutes
- Country: United Kingdom
- Language: English

San Demetrio London is a 1943 British World War II docudrama based on the true story of the 1940 salvage of the tanker MV San Demetrio by some of her own crew, who reboarded her after she had been set on fire by the German heavy cruiser Admiral Scheer and then abandoned, during the Battle of the Atlantic. The film was produced by Michael Balcon for Ealing Studios and directed by Charles Frend.

== Plot ==
The film is a reconstruction of the story of the salvage of the British tanker, MV San Demetrio. Carrying a cargo of oil home from Galveston, Texas, she was damaged and set on fire by shells from the German cruiser Admiral Scheer, and was abandoned by her crew. Of the three lifeboats which escaped, two were picked up by other ships. After drifting for three days, the occupants of the third, who included the chief engineer and the second officer, reboarded the burning San Demetrio. They managed to extinguish the fires, pumped out water using bilge pumps, repaired the steering, restarted the engines, and adjusted the cargo to raise the damaged bow. Despite being low on rations, and battling against inclement weather, they successfully returned to Britain, sailing into the Clyde ten days later.

== Cast ==
- Arthur Young as Captain George Waite
- Walter Fitzgerald as Chief Engineer Charles Pollard
- Ralph Michael as 2nd Officer Hawkins
- Neville Mapp as 3rd Engineer Willey
- Barry Letts as Apprentice John Jones
- Michael Allen as Cadet Roy Housden
- Frederick Piper as Boatswain W.E. Fletcher
- Herbert Cameron as Pumpman Davies
- John Owers as Steward
- Gordon Jackson as Messboy John Jamieson
- Robert Beatty as "Yank" Preston
- Charles Victor as Deckhand
- James McKechnie as Deckhand
- John Coyle as Deckhand
- Duncan McIntyre as Deckhand (as Duncan MacIntyre)
- Rex Holt as Deckhand
- Mervyn Johns as Greaser John Boyle
- Lawrence O'Madden as Captain E.S.F. Fegen V.C. – HMS Jervis Bay
- James Donald as Gunnery Control Officer – HMS Jervis Bay
- James Sadler as Officer of the Watch – HMS Jervis Bay
- Peter Miller Street as Midshipman – HMS Jervis Bay
- David Horne as Mr. Justice Langton
- Nigel Clarke as R.J.E. Dodds – Shipping Manager
- James Knight as Captain Smith – SS Gloucester City
- Diana Decker as Shopgirl

== Production ==
Although Charles Frend is given sole credit as director, the film was completed by Robert Hamer after Frend became ill. The San Demetrio's chief engineer, Charles Pollard, was employed as a special adviser. Early film star Bessie Love, her acting prospects having declined, worked on this movie doing continuity, first as an assistant and towards the end of production taking over when the original "continuity girl" left to deliver a baby.

== Reception ==
According to trade papers, the film was a success at the British box office in 1944.

Kinematograph Weekly said the film "made its presence felt" in February of that year.

The Monthly Film Bulletin said that "In places the music is a trifle too strident; some of the model shots are less successful than others, but on the whole justice has been done to a great theme.

The model used in the film is on display at the Imperial War Museum in London.

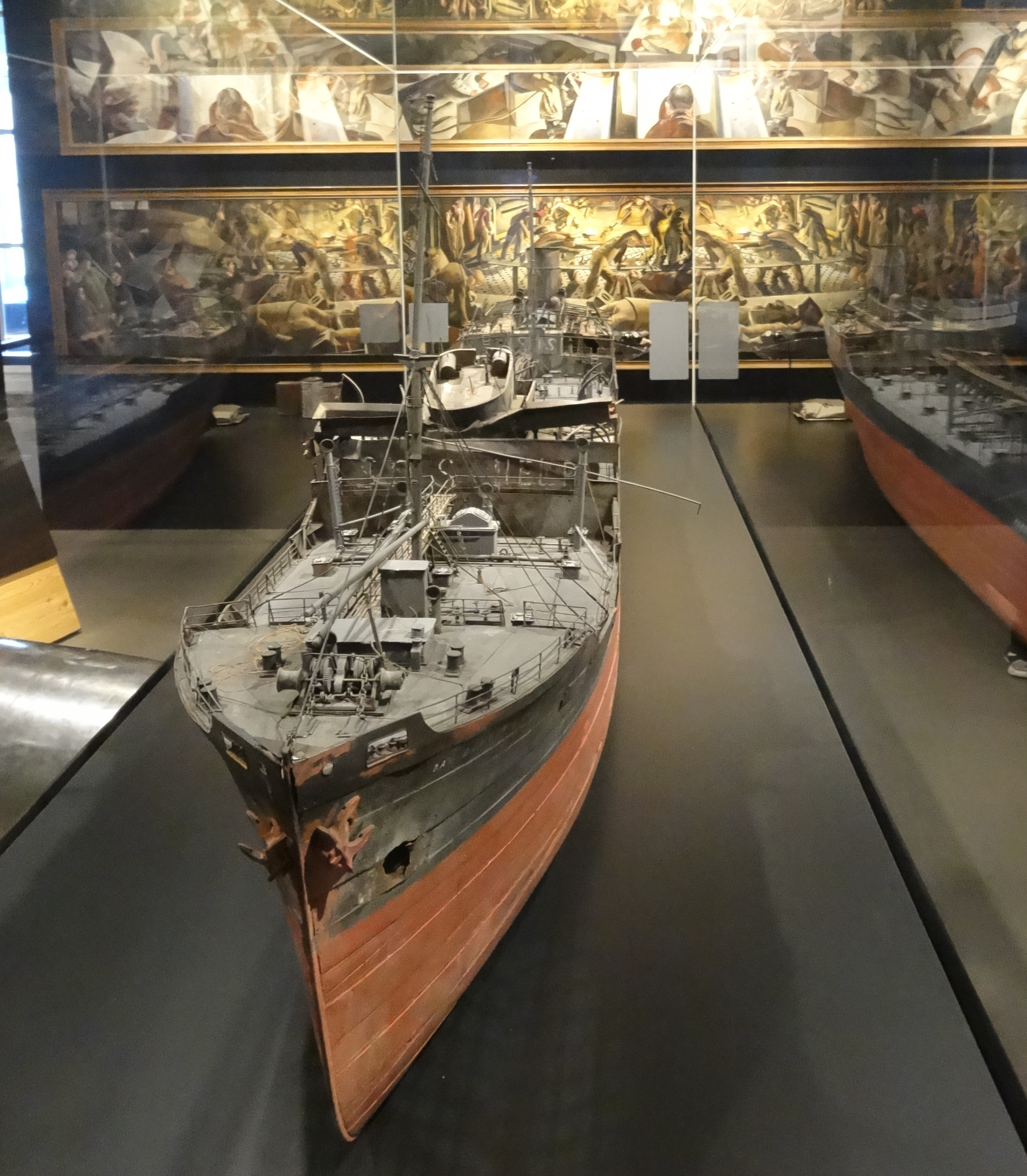
Model made for film, view from front

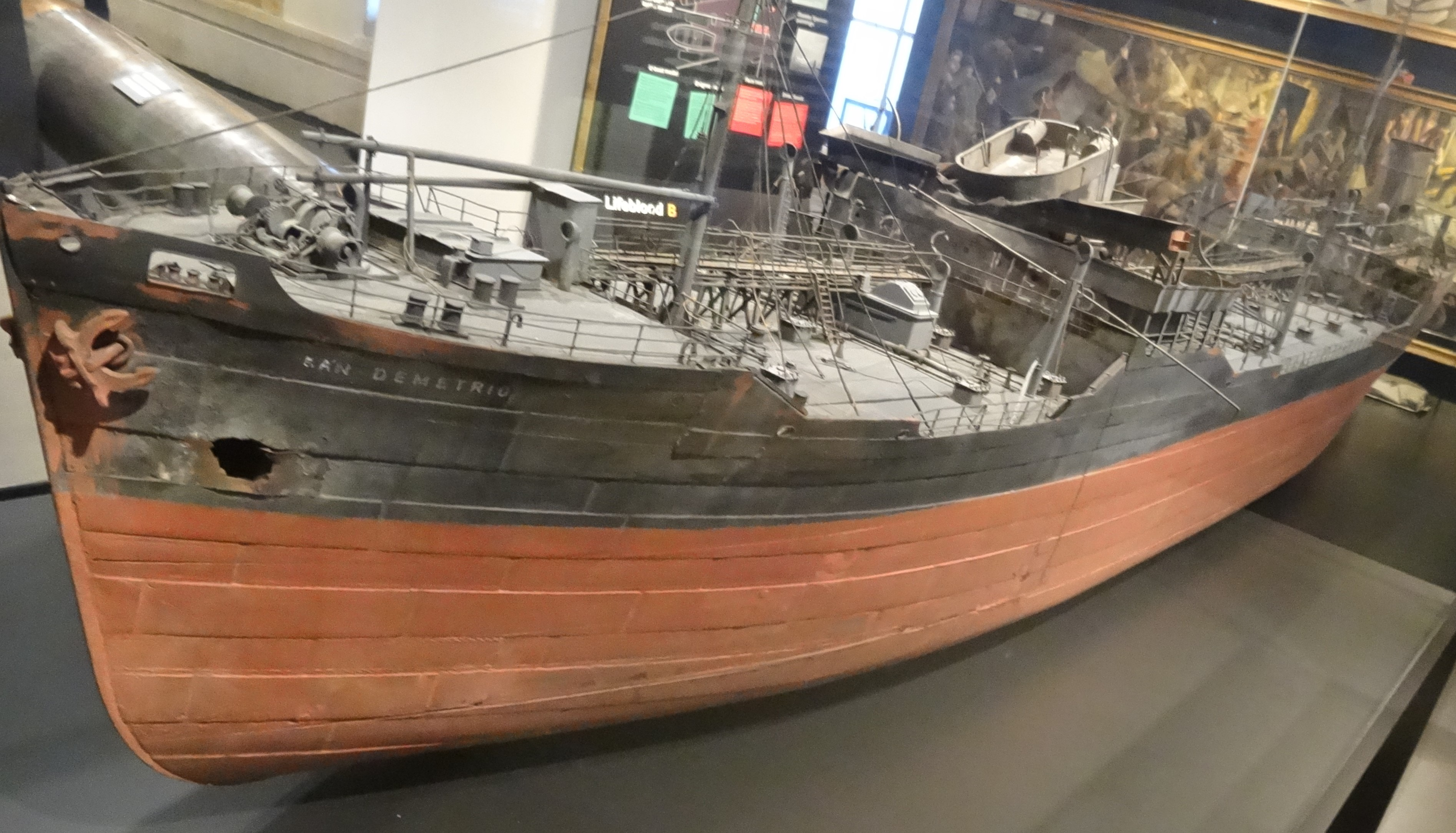
Model showing damage to central section

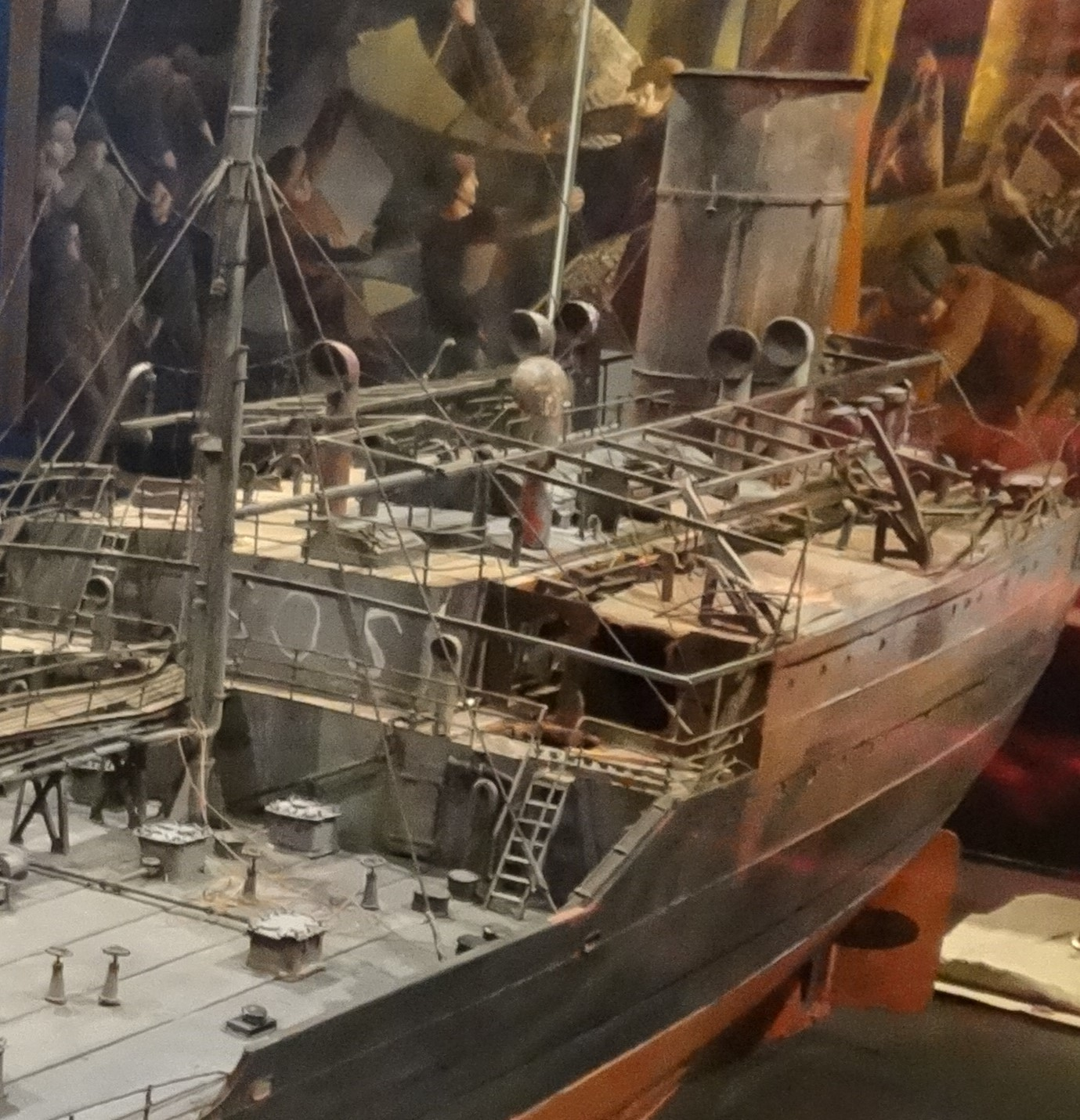
Details of damage to stern as shown on model
