= The Return of the Vikings =

1944 film

- Directed by: Charles Frend
- Produced by: Michael Balcon
- Starring: Leo Genn; Frederick Piper; Stig Egede-Nissen
- Cinematography: Ernest Palmer
- Edited by: Carl Heck
- Release date: 1944
- Running time: 53 minutes
- Country: United Kingdom
- Language: English

The Return of the Vikings is a 1944 British short dramatised documentary film directed and co-written by Charles Frend. It was produced by Ealing Studios, and concerns a Norwegian fishing boat in time of war.

== Cast ==
- Leo Genn as British colonel and narrator (voice)
- Frederick Piper as Sgt. Fred Johnson
- Stig Egede-Nissen as Gunnar
- Valerie Holman

== Reception ==
The Monthly Film Bulletin wrote: "Charles Frend has made a good job of this film, and manages to work a number of emotional passages into an ordinary matter-of-fact account of a typical Norwegian's life and experiences in this country. The production is good, and the unnamed Norwegian actors are excellent in type and quite competent in their work."

Kine Weekly wrote: "Sincere, skilfully compiled British tribute to the stalwart free Norwegians, men of Viking blood, who are fighting their country's battle against the Nazis from England. ...The picture's balance is well nigh perfect, while the commentary is cunningly relieved by scraps of natural dialogue. Excellent photography graces the whole. It's good example and stirring, thought-provoking drama and entertainment. Capital documentary."

Variety wrote: "The Return of the Vikings is another milestone in film history, because it is the first film to be made bi-lingual for the purpose of distribution in a post-war Europe. To Norway and its gallant men goes the honor of this distinction, and the result is praiseworthy."
