= Rachel Roberts (actress) =

Welsh actress (1927–1980)

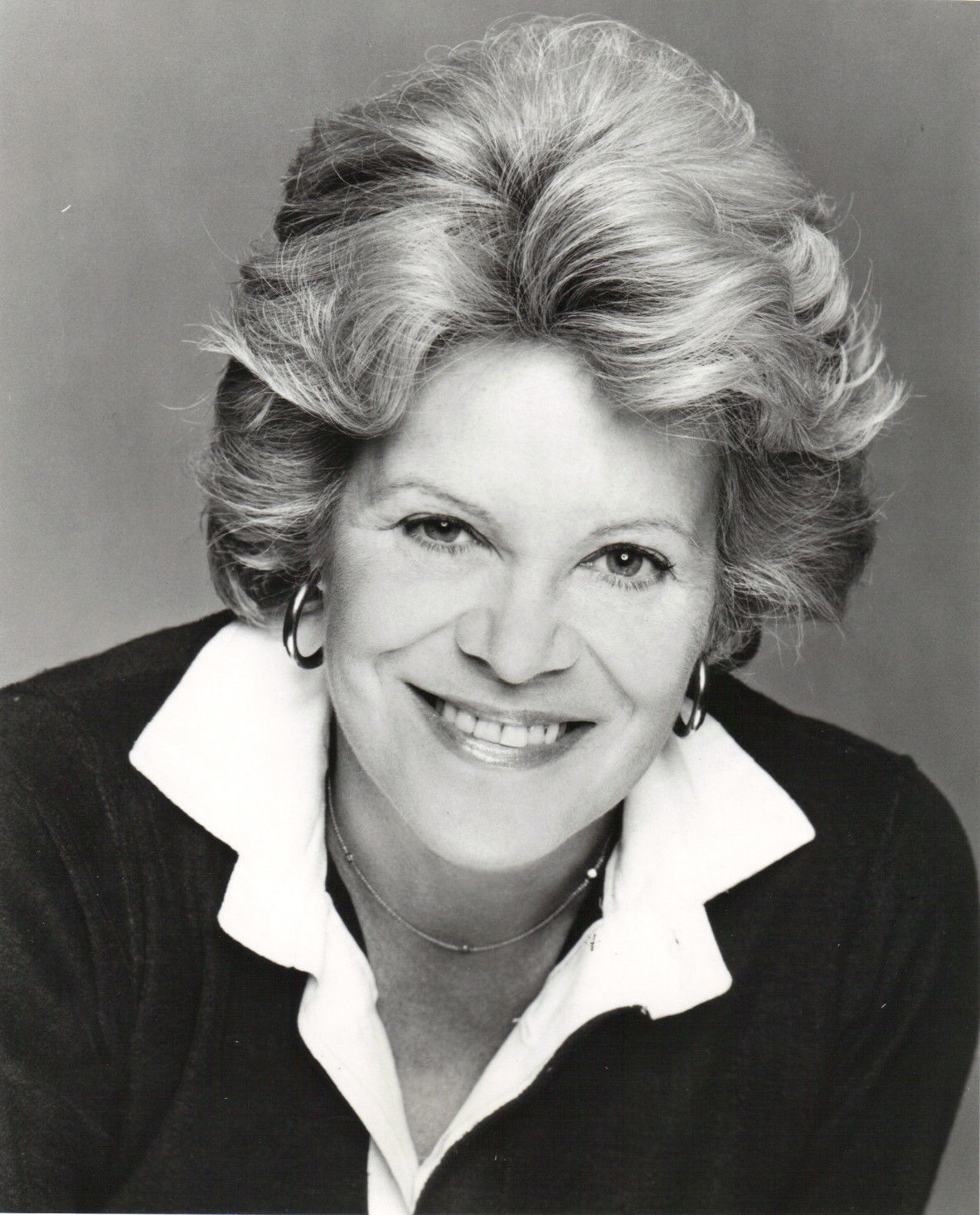
- Roberts in 1976
- Born: 20 September 1927; Llanelli, Carmarthenshire, Wales
- Died: 26 November 1980 (aged 53); Los Angeles, California, U.S.
- Education: University of Wales; Royal Academy of Dramatic Art
- Years active: 1953–1980
- Spouses: Alan Dobie (m. 1955; div. 1960) Rex Harrison (m. 1962; div. 1971)

Rachel Roberts (20 September 1927 – 26 November 1980) was a Welsh actress. She is best remembered for her screen performances as the older mistress of the central male characters in both Saturday Night and Sunday Morning (1960) and This Sporting Life (1963). For each, she won the BAFTA Award for Best British Actress. She was also nominated for the Academy Award for Best Actress for This Sporting Life. Her other notable film appearances included Murder on the Orient Express (1974), Picnic at Hanging Rock (1975) and Yanks (1979).

Roberts's theatre credits included the original production of the musical Maggie May in 1964. She was nominated for the 1974 Tony Award for Best Actress in a Play for the plays Chemin de Fer and The Visit, and won a Drama Desk Award in 1976 for Habeas Corpus.

== Early life and career ==
Roberts was born in Llanelli, Carmarthenshire, Wales, the daughter of a Baptist minister, though she later rebelled against her upbringing. After studying at the University of Wales in Aberystwyth and the Royal Academy of Dramatic Art, she began working with a repertory company in Swansea in 1950. Her film debut was in Gilbert Gunn's Welsh-set comedy Valley of Song (1953).

Her portrayal of Brenda in Karel Reisz's Saturday Night and Sunday Morning (1960) won her a British Academy Film Award. Lindsay Anderson cast her as the long suffering Mrs Hammond in This Sporting Life (1963), earning her another BAFTA and an Oscar nomination. Both films were significant examples of the British New Wave of film-making.

In theatre, she performed at the Royal Court and played the title role as the life-enhancing prostitute in Lionel Bart's musical Maggie May (1964). On film she played a dual role as a suicidal housewife and a predatory PR officer in Lindsay Anderson's O Lucky Man! (1973). It was her work as Hildegarde Schmitt in Murder on the Orient Express (1974) that got her a leading part in Peter Weir's Picnic at Hanging Rock (1975), playing the authoritarian head teacher of a girls' school in 1900 Australia.

After relocating to Los Angeles in the early 1970s, she appeared in supporting roles in several American films such as Foul Play (1978). Her final British film was Yanks (1979), directed by John Schlesinger, for which she received a Supporting Actress BAFTA.

In 1976, she won a Drama Desk Award for her performance in Alan Bennett's play Habeas Corpus. In 1979, Roberts co-starred with Jill Bennett in the London Weekend Television production of Alan Bennett's The Old Crowd, directed by Lindsay Anderson.

== Personal life ==
Roberts was married twice and had no children. She first married actor Alan Dobie in 1955. They divorced in 1960. The following year, Roberts married actor Rex Harrison in Genoa, Italy. The marriage was tumultuous; Roberts and Harrison both drank excessively and engaged in public fights. Harrison later left Roberts and they divorced in 1971. Later that year, Harrison married British socialite Elizabeth Rees-Williams, Roberts's former best friend.

Roberts was known in the entertainment industry for the eccentric behaviour that stemmed from her alcoholism. At the time of her death, Roberts was intermittently with Darren Ramirez, a man almost 20 years her junior. It was a largely platonic relationship. In her final years she became obsessed with rekindling her relationship with Harrison.

== Death ==
Rachel Roberts was devastated by her divorce from Rex Harrison, and her alcoholism and depression worsened. She moved to Hollywood in 1975 and tried to forget the relationship. In 1980, Roberts attempted to reconcile with Harrison, but he was married to his sixth and final wife, Mercia Tinker.

On 26 November 1980, Rachel Roberts died at her home in Los Angeles at the age of 53. Her death was initially attributed to a heart attack. Her gardener found her body on her kitchen floor, lying amidst shards of glass; she had fallen through a decorative glass divide between two rooms. An autopsy later determined that her death was a result of swallowing lye or another alkali, or another unidentified caustic substance, as well as barbiturates and alcohol, as detailed in her posthumously published journals. The corrosive effect of the alkali was the immediate cause of death. The coroner documented the cause of death as "swallowing a caustic substance" and, later, "acute barbiturate intoxication." Her death was ruled a suicide.

Roberts was cremated at the Chapel of the Pines Crematory in Los Angeles. Her journals became the basis for No Bells on Sunday: The Memoirs of Rachel Roberts, published in 1984.

In 1992, Roberts's ashes, along with those of her friend Jill Bennett, who died by suicide in 1990, were scattered on the River Thames in London by director Lindsay Anderson during a boat trip, with several of the two actresses' professional colleagues and friends aboard; musician Alan Price sang "Is That All There Is?" The event was included as a segment in Anderson's BBC documentary film, also titled Is That All There Is?.

== Filmography ==
Film
Year	Title	Role	Notes
1953	Valley of Song	Bessie Lewis	Alternative title: Men Are Children Twice
1953	The Limping Man	Barmaid	
1954	The Weak and the Wicked	Pat, pregnant inmate	Alternative title: Young and Willing
1954	The Crowded Day	Maggie	Alternative title: Shop Spoiled
1957	The Good Companions	Elsie and Effie Longstaff	
1959	Our Man in Havana	Prostitute	Uncredited
1960	Saturday Night and Sunday Morning	Brenda	BAFTA Award for Best Actress in a Leading Role
1961	Girl on Approval	Anne Howland	
1963	This Sporting Life	Mrs. Margaret Hammond	BAFTA Award for Best Actress in a Leading Role; Nominated — Academy Award for Best Actress; Nominated — Golden Globe Award for Best Actress - Motion Picture Drama
1968	A Flea in Her Ear	Suzanne de Castilian	
1969	The Reckoning	Joyce Eglington	Alternative title: A Matter of Honour
1971	Doctors' Wives	Della Randolph	
1971	Wild Rovers	Maybell (town madam)	
1973	The Belstone Fox	Cathie Smith	Alternative title: Free Spirit
1973	O Lucky Man!	Gloria Rowe / Madame Paillard / Mrs. Richards	
1974	Murder on the Orient Express	Hildegarde Schmidt	
1975	Picnic at Hanging Rock	Mrs. Appleyard	
1978	Foul Play	Delia Darrow / Gerda Casswell	
1979	Yanks	Mrs. Clarrie Moreton	BAFTA Award for Best Actress in a Supporting Role
1979	When a Stranger Calls	Dr. Monk	
1981	Charlie Chan and the Curse of the Dragon Queen	Mrs. Dangers	Posthumous release (final theatrical film)

Television
Year	Title	Role	Notes
1958	The Firm of Girdlestone	Mrs. Scully	Miniseries
1958–1959	Our Mutual Friend	Lizzie Hexam	Miniseries
1960	On Trial	Mrs. Rogerson	Episode: "The Dilke Case"
1960	BBC Sunday-Night Play	Stella/Mrs. Holyoake	2 episodes
1963	The Eleventh Hour	Mary Newell	Episode: "This Wonderful Madman Calls Me Beauty"
1966	ITV Play of the Week	Lady Hamilton	Episode: "Nelson: A Study in Miniature"
1966	Out of the Unknown	Anna Preston	Episode: "Frankenstein Mark 2"
1966	Blithe Spirit	Ruth Condomine	Television movie
1969	Destiny of a Spy	Megan Thomas	Television movie
1969	Happy Ever After	Joanna Bulstrode	Episode: "The Party Piece"
1970	Night Gallery	Rebecca Brigham	Segment: "Certain Shadows on the Wall"
1971	Marcus Welby, M.D.	Dr. Victoria Thorson	Episode: "A Woman's Place"
1973	Alpha Beta	Nora Elliot	Television movie
1973	Baffled!	Mrs. Farraday	Television movie
1974	ITV Playhouse	Dorothy	Episode: Graceless Go I
1974	Play for Today	Olwen	Episode: "Back of Beyond"
1974	Great Expectations	Mrs. Gargery	Television movie
1976–1978	The Tony Randall Show	Mrs. Bonnie McClellen	32 episodes
1977	A Circle of Children	Helga	Television movie
1979	Family	Angela Brown	Episode: "Exits and Entrances"
1979	Six Plays by Alan Bennett: The Old Crowd	Pauline	Television movie
1979	3 by Cheever: The Sorrows of Gin	Mrs. Henlein	Television movie
1980	The Hostage Tower	Sonya	Television movie
1982	The Wall	Regina Kowalska	Television movie, posthumous release (final film role)

== Bibliography ==
- Anderson, Lindsay (2004). Sutton, Paul (ed.). Lindsay Anderson: The Diaries. London: Methuen. ISBN 0-413-77397-3.
