= Charles Frend =

English film director and editor (1909–1977)

- Born: Charles Herbert Frend; 21 November 1909; Pulborough, Sussex, England
- Died: 8 January 1977 (aged 67); London, England
- Occupations: Film director, film editor
- Years active: 1931–1970
- Notable work: Scott of the Antarctic; The Cruel Sea; The Long Arm
- Spouse: Sonja Petra Baade Thorburn

Charles Herbert Frend (21 November 1909 – 8 January 1977) was an English film director and editor, closely associated with Ealing Studios. Beginning his career as a film editor, he worked on a number of major British productions during the 1930s, including four films directed by Alfred Hitchcock. His editing of Goodbye, Mr. Chips (1939) earned him a nomination for the Academy Award for Best Film Editing.

After moving into directing under producer Michael Balcon, Frend became one of Ealing's key directors. His films included Scott of the Antarctic (1948), A Run for Your Money (1949), The Cruel Sea (1953), The Long Arm (1956) and Barnacle Bill (1957). The Cruel Sea was the most successful film at the British box office in 1953, while The Long Arm received a Silver Bear at the 6th Berlin International Film Festival.

== Biography ==
=== Early life ===
Frend was born in Pulborough, Sussex, on 21 November 1909 to Edward Charles and Bertha Maud Frend. He was educated at The King's School, Canterbury and at Oxford University, where he was the film critic of The Isis Magazine.

=== Editor ===
Frend began his career in the film industry at British International Pictures in 1931. He worked as an editor on Arms and the Man (1932).

He moved to Gaumont British Pictures, where he worked under producer Michael Balcon. He edited Alfred Hitchcock's Waltzes from Vienna (1934), followed by My Song for You (1934), Oh, Daddy! (1934), Tom Walls' Fighting Stock (1935), The Tunnel (1935), and Car of Dreams (1935).

Frend was reunited with Hitchcock for Secret Agent (1936) and Sabotage (1936); between them he edited East Meets West (1936).

Frend was borrowed by Alexander Korda for Conquest of the Air (1936), on which he was also credited as narrator. He returned to Gaumont British to edit The Great Barrier (1936) and Hitchcock's Young and Innocent (1937).

=== MGM-British ===
When Balcon moved to MGM British at Denham Film Studios, he brought Frend with him. While there, Frend edited A Yank at Oxford (1938), The Citadel (1938) and Goodbye, Mr. Chips (1939).

Frend's editing of Goodbye, Mr. Chips earned him a nomination for the Academy Award for Best Film Editing at the 12th Academy Awards in 1940. The film received seven Academy Award nominations in total, with Robert Donat winning the award for Best Actor.

Korda used Frend again for The Lion Has Wings (1939). He was subsequently hired by Gabriel Pascal for Major Barbara (1941). By this point he had become established as one of Britain's leading film editors, but wanted to move into directing.

=== Director at Ealing Studios ===
Michael Balcon had taken over Ealing Studios and gave Frend the opportunity to direct his first feature, the semi-documentary The Big Blockade (1942), which Frend also co-wrote. Frend developed as one of Ealing's key directors, alongside Charles Crichton, Alexander Mackendrick and Robert Hamer.

Frend followed his first feature with The Foreman Went to France (1943), a wartime drama inspired by the attempt to retrieve specialised machinery from France during the German invasion.

He then directed San Demetrio London (1943); Robert Hamer completed the film after Frend fell ill. He also directed the short subject The Return of the Vikings (1943), followed by Johnny Frenchman (1945).

=== Post-war films ===
Frend's first non-war film was the melodrama The Loves of Joanna Godden (1947), adapted from the 1921 novel Joanna Godden by Sheila Kaye-Smith.

He followed it with Scott of the Antarctic (1948), depicting Robert Falcon Scott's expedition to the South Pole. The film was a major Ealing production and was highly successful at the British box office.

Frend then moved into comedy, making A Run for Your Money (1949), which he also co-wrote, and The Magnet (1950).

He returned to wartime subject matter with The Cruel Sea (1953), adapted from the novel by Nicholas Monsarrat. The film portrayed Royal Navy convoy escorts during the Battle of the Atlantic and became the most successful film at the British box office in 1953.

Starring Jack Hawkins, Donald Sinden, Denholm Elliott, Virginia McKenna and Stanley Baker, The Cruel Sea became one of Frend's best-known films and a prominent example of the cycle of British Second World War films made during the 1950s.

Frend next directed Robert Donat in the drama Lease of Life (1954).

His police procedural The Long Arm (1956), starring Jack Hawkins, received the Silver Bear for an Outstanding Artistic Contribution at the 6th Berlin International Film Festival.

Frend directed Alec Guinness in Barnacle Bill (1957), the penultimate Ealing comedy. The studio would soon be sold.

=== Television ===
Frend subsequently moved increasingly into television, directing episodes of Interpol Calling, Schilling Playhouse and Danger Man.

He returned to films with Cone of Silence (1960) for Balcon's new Bryanston Films, and Girl on Approval (1961).

Frend then directed further television productions including Man of the World, The Sentimental Agent and Zero One, before directing another feature, Torpedo Bay (1963), with James Mason.

=== Final productions ===
His last credit as principal director was The Sky Bike (1967) for the Children's Film Foundation.

Frend subsequently directed episodes of Man in a Suitcase, and worked as a second-unit director on Guns in the Heather and David Lean's Ryan's Daughter (1970).

Frend died in a hospital in London on 8 January 1977, aged 67, after a long illness.

== Awards and recognition ==
Frend was nominated for the Academy Award for Best Film Editing for Goodbye, Mr. Chips at the 12th Academy Awards in 1940.

In 1956, The Long Arm received the Silver Bear for an Outstanding Artistic Contribution at the 6th Berlin International Film Festival.

Frend's career spanned more than three decades of British cinema. It began in editing during the early sound era, included work with Hitchcock and Korda, developed into a long association with Balcon and Ealing Studios, and continued into television and second-unit direction.

== Selected filmography ==
=== Film ===
Year	Title	Director	Writer
1942	The Big Blockade	Yes	Yes
1943	The Foreman Went to France	Yes	No
1943	The Saving Grave (short)	Yes	No
1943	San Demetrio London	Yes	Yes
1944	The Return of the Vikings	Yes	Yes
1945	Johnny Frenchman	Yes	No
1947	The Loves of Joanna Godden	Yes	No
1948	Scott of the Antarctic	Yes	No
1949	A Run for Your Money	Yes	Yes
1950	The Magnet	Yes	No
1953	The Cruel Sea	Yes	No
1954	Lease of Life	Yes	No
1956	The Long Arm	Yes	No
1957	Barnacle Bill	Yes	No
1960	Cone of Silence	Yes	No
1961	Girl on Approval	Yes	No
1963	Torpedo Bay	Yes	No
1967	The Sky Bike	Yes	Yes

Editor

- Arms and the Man (1932)
- Waltzes from Vienna (1934)
- My Song for You (1934)
- Oh, Daddy! (1935)
- Fighting Stock (1935)
- The Tunnel (1935)
- Car of Dreams (1935)
- Secret Agent (1936)
- East Meets West (1936)
- Sabotage (1936)
- The Conquest of the Air (1936) (Also narrator)
- The Great Barrier (1937)
- Young and Innocent (1937)
- A Yank at Oxford (1938)
- The Citadel (1938)
- Goodbye, Mr. Chips (1939)
- The Lion Has Wings (1939)
- Major Barbara (1941)

2nd unit director

- Guns in the Heather (1969)
- Ryan's Daughter (1970)

=== Television ===
- Interpol Calling (1959–60)
- Danger Man (1960–61)
- Rendezvous (1959–61)
- Man of the World (1962)
- Zero One (1963)
- The Sentimental Agent (1963)
- Man in a Suitcase (1968)

== Personal life ==
In his entry in Who's Who, Frend listed "the cinema" as his recreation. In 1940, Frend married Sonja Petra Baade Thorburn.

Frend was a life-long friend of producer Sir Michael Balcon. Their professional association extended from Frend's work as an editor at Gaumont British and MGM-British through his directing career at Ealing and later work for Bryanston Films.

After Frend's death, Balcon described him as broad-minded and liberal, with a pride in Britain and the British people that was reflected in his work.
