= Bryanston Films (UK) =

British film company (1959–1963)

- Opening logo from A Taste of Honey (1961)
- Industry: Film
- Founded: 1959
- Defunct: 1963
- Headquarters: United Kingdom

Bryanston Films was a British film company formed by Michael Balcon and Maxwell Setton in mid-1959 following the collapse of Ealing Studios. Neither a production studio, nor a distributor, it released independent British films through British Lion Films In operation until 1963, it was intended to be an unofficial group of independent film producers.

== History ==
The Bryanston consortium was composed of 12 to 15 members who bought their way in by putting up £5,000; the equity of the group guaranteed distribution through British Lion and financing from the National Film Finance Corporation, banks, and American producers. In addition to Balcon and Setton, members included Kenneth Shipman, John Bryan, Tony Richardson, Julian Wintle and Ronald Neame. Alliance Films, Denham Laboratories and Lloyds Bank were also investors. Producer-investors were meant to "vet" each other's scripts. Ronald Neame said that:

The old complaint of producers has always been that the distributors tend to ask us for old formula films. Many of us have said this has forced us to be less enterprising than we would wish to be. But now the onus is on us. If I submit a script to Bryanston, I know it will be vetted by fellow producers whose opinions I respect.

The company started off with £1,000,000. It was followed a few months later by Allied Film Makers which tried a similar scheeme through Rank. Bryanston made six films in its first year.

In November 1961 the company announced it would go into co-production with Seven Arts Productions, to make Sammy Going South and Tom Jones.

Bryanston distributed several films made by Woodfall Film Productions but refused to produce Tom Jones (1963) in colour, the success of which could have established the company for a long time. United Artists stepped in to finance the film instead.

Bryanston released its last film in 1964 and the company was sold to Associated-Rediffusion in 1965. Balcon later became head of British Lion Films.

== Selected films ==
- The Battle of the Sexes (1959)
- Cone of Silence (1960)
- Light Up the Sky! (1960)
- The Entertainer (1960)
- The Big Day (1960)
- The Boy Who Stole a Million (1960)
- Saturday Night and Sunday Morning (1960)
- Linda (1960)
- Double Bunk (1961)
- Two and Two Make Six (1961)
- Girl on Approval (1961)
- Dangerous Afternoon (1961)
- The Wind of Change (1961)
- Spare the Rod (1961)
- The Impersonator (1961)
- A Taste of Honey (1961)
- Dilemma (1962)
- Lunch Hour (1962)
- Strongroom (1962)
- The Quare Fellow (1962)
- A Prize of Arms (1962)
- Don't Talk to Strange Men (1962)
- The Loneliness of the Long Distance Runner (1962)
- Panic (1963)
- Calculated Risk (1963)
- The Small World of Sammy Lee (1963)
- Sammy Going South (1963)
- A Place to Go (1963)
- Girl in the Headlines (1963)
- Ladies Who Do (1963)
- The Wild Affair (1963)
- The System (1964)
