= Scott of the Antarctic (film) =

1948 British film by Charles Frend

- Original cinema poster
- Directed by: Charles Frend
- Written by: Walter Meade; Ivor Montagu; Mary Hayley Bell
- Produced by: Michael Balcon
- Starring: John Mills; James Robertson Justice; Barry Letts
- Cinematography: Osmond Borradaile; Jack Cardiff; Geoffrey Unsworth
- Edited by: Peter Tanner
- Music by: Ralph Vaughan Williams (as Vaughan Williams)
- Color process: Technicolor
- Production company: Ealing Studios
- Distributed by: General Film Distributors (UK)
- Release date: 29 November 1948 (UK)
- Running time: 110 minutes
- Country: United Kingdom
- Language: English
- Budget: £371,599
- Box office: £214,223

Scott of the Antarctic is a 1948 British adventure film starring John Mills as Robert Falcon Scott in his ill-fated attempt to reach the South Pole. The film more or less faithfully recreates the events that befell the Terra Nova Expedition in 1912.

The film was directed by Charles Frend from screenplay by Ivor Montagu and Walter Meade with "additional dialogue" by the novelist Mary Hayley Bell (Mills' wife). The film score was by Ralph Vaughan Williams, who reworked elements of it into his 1952 Sinfonia antartica. The supporting cast included James Robertson Justice, Derek Bond, Kenneth More, John Gregson, Barry Letts and Christopher Lee.

Much of the film was shot in Technicolor at Ealing Studios in London. Landscape and glacier exteriors were shot in the Swiss Alps and in Norway. Background scenes were shot in the Antarctic islands.

== Plot ==
Captain Scott is given the men, but not the funds, to go on a second expedition to the Antarctic. As his wife works on a bust of him, she tells him that she is "not the least jealous" that he is going to the Antarctic again. The wife of Dr. E. A. Wilson, whom Scott hopes to recruit, is much less enthusiastic, but Wilson agrees to go on condition it is a scientific expedition. Scott also visits Fridtjof Nansen, who insists that a polar expedition must use only dogs, not the motor sledges or ponies that Scott proposes. Scott goes on a fundraising campaign, with mixed results, finding scepticism among Liverpool businessmen who are interested primarily in economic opportunities, but also enthusiasm among schoolchildren who help fund the sledge dogs. With the assistance of a government grant he finally manages to raise just enough money to finance the expedition, with some economies.

After a stop in New Zealand, the ship sets sail for Antarctica. They set up a camp at the coast, where they spend the winter and hold a Midwinter Feast on 22 June 1911. In the spring a small contingent of men, ponies and dogs begins the trek towards the pole. About halfway, the ponies are, as planned, shot for food and some of the men are sent back with the dogs. At the three-quarter mark, Scott selects the five-man team to make the push to the pole, hoping to return by the end of March 1912. They reach the pole only to find the Norwegian flag already planted there and a letter from Roald Amundsen asking Scott to deliver it to the King of Norway.

Hugely disappointed, Scott's team begins the long journey back. When reaching the mountains bordering the polar plateau, Wilson shows the men some sea plant and tree fossils he has found, also a piece of coal, proving that the Antarctic must have been a warm place once. Scott ironically notes the economic possibilities. Scott is increasingly concerned about the health of two men: Evans, who has a serious cut on his hand, and Oates, whose foot is badly frostbitten. Evans eventually collapses and dies, and is buried under the snow. Realising that his condition is slowing the team down, Oates says "I hope I don't wake tomorrow" but when he does, he sacrifices himself by crawling out of the tent, saying "I'm just going outside; I may be away some time." ( [sic]; the words as famously recorded by Scott are "...and may be some time"). Finally, just 11 miles short of a supply depot, the rest of the team dies in their tent trapped by a blizzard. Each man writes his farewell letters, with frostbitten Scott also writing his famous "Message to the Public", saying "I do not regret this journey..."

Months later, on a clear sunny day, the search party discovers the completely snowed-over tent. After a shot of Scott's diary being recovered, the film ends with the sight of a wooden cross with the five names of the dead inscribed on it as well as the quote: "To strive to seek to find and not to yield." (Commas left out; a line from the poem "Ulysses", by Alfred, Lord Tennyson.)

== Cast ==
- John Mills as Captain R.F. Scott R.N.
- Diana Churchill as Kathleen Scott
- Harold Warrender as Dr. E.A. Wilson
- Anne Firth as Oriana Wilson
- Derek Bond as Captain L.E.G. Oates
- Reginald Beckwith as Lieutenant H.R. Bowers
- James Robertson Justice as Petty Officer 'Taff' Evans R.N.
- Kenneth More as Lieutenant E.G.R. 'Teddy' Evans R.N.
- Norman Williams as Chief Stoker W. Lashly R.N.
- John Gregson as Petty Officer T. Crean R.N.
- James McKechnie as Surgeon Lieutenant E.L. Atkinson R.N.
- Barry Letts as Apsley Cherry-Garrard
- Dennis Vance as Charles S. Wright
- Larry Burns as Petty Officer P. Keohane R.N.
- Edward Lisak as Dimitri
- Melville Crawford as Cecil Meares
- Christopher Lee as Bernard Day
- John Owers as F.J. Hooper
- Bruce Seton as Lieutenant H. Pennell R.N.
- Clive Morton as Herbert Ponting
- Sam Kydd as Leading Stoker E. McKenzie R.N.
- Mary Merret as Helen Field
- Percy Walsh as Chairman of Meeting
- Noel Howlett as First Questioner
- Philip Stainton as Second Questioner
- Desmond Roberts as Admiralty Official
- Dandy Nichols as Caroline
- David Lines as Telegraph Boy
- Stig Egede-Nissen as Dr. Fridtjof Nansen

== Production ==
=== Development ===
Towards the end of the war, Michael Balcon of Ealing Studios, was keen to "carry on the tradition that made British documentary film preeminent during the war. These were the days when we were inspired by the heroic deeds typical of British greatness."

In 1944, Charles Frend and Sidney Cole pitched the idea of a film about the Scott expedition. Balcon was interested, so they wrote up a story treatment which Balcon approved. Ealing secured co-operation from Scott's widow (who would die in 1947). Walter Meade wrote the first draft.

The extensive number of interviews that were done with surviving team members and relatives from Scott's expedition were acknowledged at the start of the film with the credit:

"This film could not have been made without the generous co-operation of the survivors and the relatives of late members of Scott's Last Expedition. To them and to those many other persons and organisations too numerous to mention individually who gave such able assistance and encouragement, the producers express their deepest gratitude."

=== Casting ===
In 1947 it was announced that John Mills, then one of the biggest stars in Britain, would play the title role.

"This is the most responsible thing I have done in films," said Mills. "I was only about four when the tragedy happened, but Scott has always been one of my heroes and it's jolly satisfying to feel that the job of helping to bring the great story of British enterprise and grit to the screen has fallen to me." During the making of the film, Mills wore Scott's actual watch which had been recovered from his body.

It was an early role for Kenneth More whose audition was arranged by Stewart Granger, whose wife Elspeth March had appeared in a play with More. He wrote "the script wasn't right. Scott was a bad film—despite John Mills' magnificent performance—and certainly it was not the happiest to work on."

=== Filming ===
After three years' research for the film, cameraman Osmond Borradaile travelled 30,000 miles (48,000 km) and spent six months between 1946 and 1947 shooting footage in the Antarctic at Hope Bay, as well as in the South Shetland and South Orkney Islands.

Filming started in June 1947 in Switzerland for four weeks, at the Jungfrau Mountain and the Aletsch Glacier. In October 1947 there was a further nine weeks' location filming in Norway, near Finse, which was used to represent the area near the South Pole. The bulk of the scenes were shot at the Hardanger Jokul.

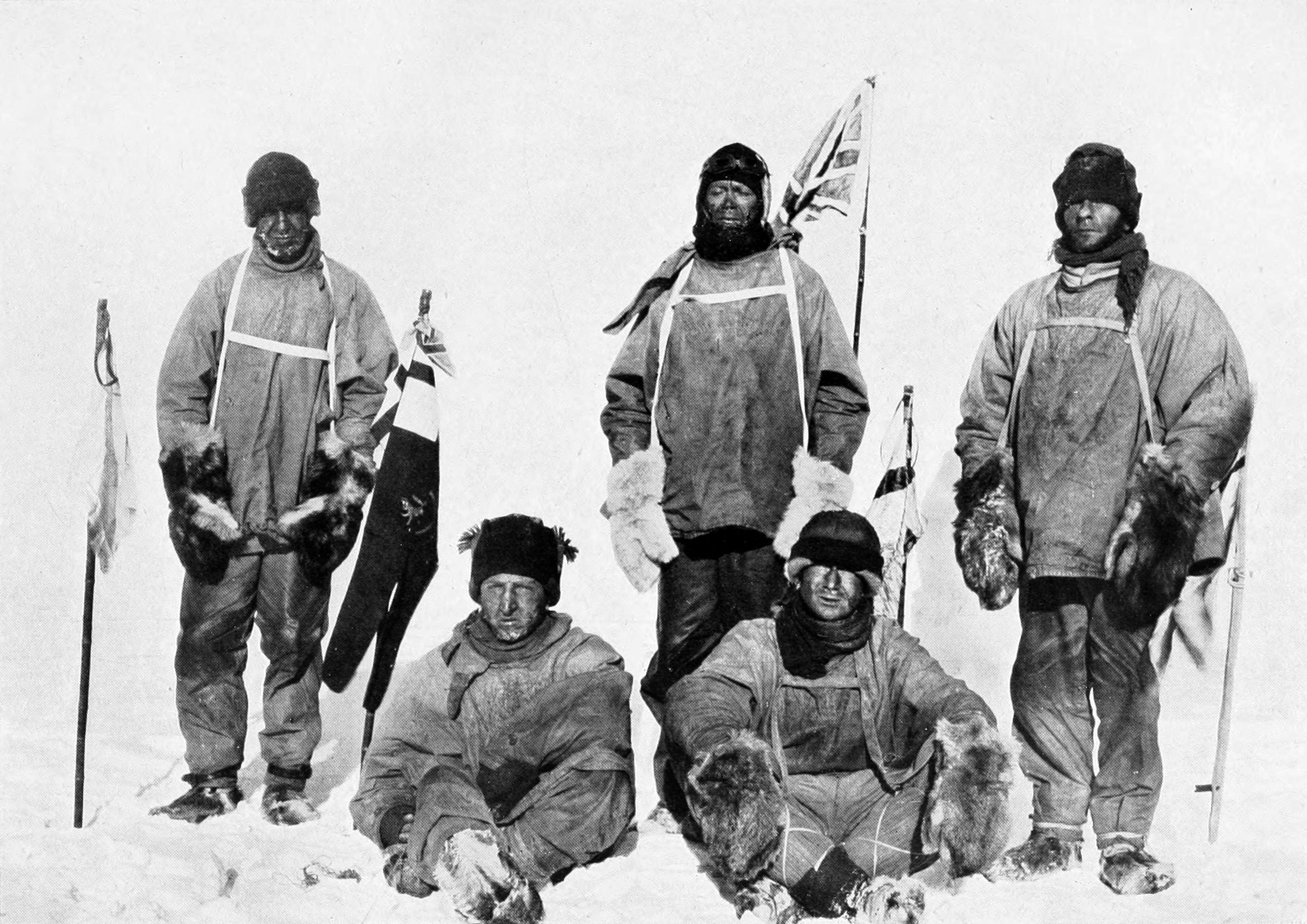
The film recreates this sombre photograph taken by Scott and his crew at the South Pole.

The film's unit transferred to Ealing Studios in London for three months of studio work.

== Release ==
The film was chosen for a Royal Command Film Performance in 1948.

== Reception ==
=== Critical ===
Variety felt the documentary-style approach robbed the piece of much of its drama.

=== Box office ===
Scott of the Antarctic was the third-most-popular film at the British box office in 1949. According to Kinematograph Weekly the 'biggest winner' at the box office in 1949 Britain was The Third Man with "runners up" being Johnny Belinda, The Secret Life of Walter Mitty, Paleface, Scott of the Antarctic, The Blue Lagoon, Maytime in Mayfair, Easter Parade, Red River and You Can't Sleep Here.

The film earned distributor's gross receipts of £214,223 in the UK of which £165,967 went to the producer. The film also performed well at the box office in Japan.

The film made a loss of £205,261.

=== Music ===
In 1953 Ralph Vaughan Williams recast and expanded his score for the film into his Seventh Symphony, "Sinfonia antartica" and, thus, the music for the film has come to be better known than the film itself.

== Historical accuracy ==
A sledge flag which was drawn up for Lawrence Oates prior to the Terra Nova Expedition, but never made. Despite not being used in real-life, it can be seen hanging among other sledge flags during the Midwinter Feast scene, and again in the scene where Scott's party pose for photographs at the South Pole.

=== Differences ===
There are several differences in the film from the real events.

In the film, Scott receives a telegram in New Zealand, but does not read it for himself or to the crew until his ship is en route to the Antarctic. It says: "I am going south. Amundsen". Scott and his crew immediately comprehend that Amundsen is heading for the South Pole. In fact, Scott received this telegram a little earlier, in Australia, and Amundsen's true text was less clear: "Beg leave to inform you Fram proceeding Antarctic Amundsen." [Fram was Amundsen's ship.] As Amundsen had publicly announced he was going to the North Pole, the real Scott and his companions did not initially grasp Amundsen's ambiguous message, according to Tryggve Gran's diary (Gran was Scott's only Norwegian expedition member).

In the film, the Terra Nova disembarks Scott's team in the Antarctic, sails along the ice barrier without Scott and unexpectedly discovers Amundsen's Antarctic base camp. The ship therefore returns to Scott's base camp and informs Scott about Amundsen's presence in the vicinity. In fact, Scott was not at his base camp during this unscheduled return of his ship but was busy laying depots in the interior of the Antarctic.

The film quotes Scott's transport plans as "from the glacier to the pole and all the way back—man hauling". In reality, Scott had instructed the base camp team to meet and fetch him with dog teams on the return journey around 1 March at latitude 82 degrees. The order was never carried out and Scott and his men died on their way home.

In the film, just before reaching the South Pole, Scott's team sight a distant flag, and realise the race is lost. In the next scene, the men arrive at Amundsen's empty tent flying a Norwegian flag at the Pole, and notice the paw prints of Amundsen's sledge-dogs. In reality, Scott and his men discovered the "sledge tracks and ski tracks going and coming and the clear trace of dogs' paws—many dogs" on the previous day when they came to a black flag Amundsen had left to mark his way back.

The film gives the impression that Scott starts to doubt at the South Pole whether he would manage to return to base camp safely, quoting "Now for the run home and a desperate struggle. I wonder if we can do it". In fact, Scott wrote "Now for the run home and a desperate struggle to get the news through first. I wonder if we can do it" (both he and Amundsen had lucrative agreements with the media on exclusive interviews, but Scott now had little chance to beat Amundsen to the cablehead in Australia). The published diary omitted these six words, which were only re-discovered long after the film was produced.

=== Causes of the tragedy ===
Given that some 1912 expedition members were still alive and were consulted in the production process, the film depicts the causes of the tragedy as they were considered in 1948.

- In Norway, Scott consults the veteran polar explorer Fridtjof Nansen, who urges Scott to rely only on dogs. Scott on the other hand insists on a variety of transport means, including motor sledges, ponies, and dogs. The historical background to Scott's portrayed reluctance is that on his 1904 expedition, Scott's dogs had died of disease while Ernest Shackleton in 1908 had nearly attained the South Pole using ponies.
- Scott's depicted fundraising speech is not effective and the government only gives him £20,000. To make the expedition possible anyway, he cancels one of his two planned ships, and settles on the dilapidated Terra Nova, a photo of which he optimistically shows to Wilson, who is unmoved. This scene reflects the real Apsley Cherry-Garrard's criticism over the lack of funds and the inappropriate ship in his book The Worst Journey in the World.
- Arriving in Antarctic waters, the ship is briefly seen to fight its way through pack-ice. The parallel to the real expedition is that the ship was delayed for the unusual period of 20 days in the pack-ice, shortening the available season for preparations.
- Having ascended the glacier up to the polar plateau, Scott sends home one of the supporting parties, addressing its leader Atkinson ("Atch") with the following words "Bye Atch. Look out for us about the beginning of March. With any luck we will be back before the ship has to go." This paraphrases Scott's real order to the dog teams to assist him home to base camp around 1 March at latitude 82 degrees. The order was never carried out and so Scott and his men died on their way home at the end of March.
- On the return journey from the pole, the men found that the stove oil canisters in the depots were not full. The seals were not broken so they speculate that the oil has evaporated.
