= A Run for Your Money =

- Directed by: Charles Frend
- Written by: Clifford Evans (story); Richard Hughes; Leslie Norman; Charles Frend; Diana Morgan (add. dialogue)
- Produced by: Michael Balcon; Leslie Norman
- Starring: Donald Houston; Meredith Edwards; Moira Lister; Alec Guinness; Hugh Griffith
- Cinematography: Douglas Slocombe
- Edited by: Michael Truman
- Music by: Ernest Irving
- Release date: 23 November 1949
- Running time: 85 minutes
- Country: United Kingdom
- Language: English
- Budget: £141,221

A Run for Your Money is a 1949 British comedy film directed by Charles Frend and starring Donald Houston and Meredith Edwards as two Welshmen visiting London for the first time. The supporting cast includes Alec Guinness, Moira Lister and Hugh Griffith. It was written by Richard Hughes, Leslie Norman and Frend based on a story by Clifford Evans, and made at Ealing Studios.

== Plot ==
Two Welsh coal miners from (fictional) Hafoduwchbenceubwllymarchogcoch, David 'Dai Number 9' Jones and Thomas 'Twm' Jones, win a contest run by the Echo newspaper. The prize is £100 each, plus the best seats for an important rugby union match between England and Wales at Twickenham. For the naive Welshmen, this is their first trip to England.

They are supposed to be met at Paddington station by Whimple, a gardening columnist on the paper, but nobody told them. Then the two miners become separated when Dai is picked up by attractive con artist Jo after she overhears them talking about the prize money. At Jo's suggestion, she and Dai go to the newspaper to collect the money. The editor makes Whimple responsible for showing Dai around, but Jo soon manages to lose him. Whimple hears about Jo's criminal methods from a fellow reporter and runs out in search of them. As they spend time together, Dai begins to fall in love with Jo, though he already has a girlfriend back in Wales: Bronwen, the boss's secretary.

Meanwhile, Twm recognizes a familiar face: Huw Price, a down-on-his-luck harpist and traditional Chief Singer with whom he had once won the grand prize at an important Welsh music festival. They go looking for Dai (between drinks at various pubs). By the time they arrive at the Echo to collect Twm's share of the prize, they are sopping drunk. Not knowing who Twm is, the editor has the pair kicked out. Eventually, Twm and Huw give up and go to the rugby match, getting there just as it ends (Wales wins). There, they meet up with Whimple.

Jo takes Dai shopping for a diamond ring for Bronwen; her confederate Barney tries to cheat him, but Dai changes his mind about which ring he wants and ends up getting a fair deal. Jo takes him back to her flat so Barney can sneak in and steal Dai's money. Dai proposes that she move to Wales and offers to give her money to pay for the fare, but then he remembers Bronwen and changes his mind. Disappointed more than she expected, she steals his money. Just then, Whimple shows up and tells Dai the truth about the woman, but she runs off.

A chase ensues. Dai gets Jo's purse, with the money in it, and runs to catch the train back to Wales, where he is reunited with Twm and Huw. Jo and Barney bring a policeman and accuse Dai of being a thief; to avoid trouble, Dai gives back the purse. As the train pulls out though, Jo throws him back his money, much to Barney's disgust.

== Cast ==
- Donald Houston as Dai
- Meredith Edwards as Twm
- Moira Lister as Jo
- Alec Guinness as Whimple
- Hugh Griffith as Huw
- Clive Morton as editor
- Julie Milton as Bronwen
- Peter Edwards as Davies manager
- Joyce Grenfell as Mrs. Pargiter
- Leslie Perrins as Barney
- Dorothy Bramhall as Jane
- Andrew Leigh as the pawnbroker
- Edward Rigby as Beefeater
- Desmond Walter-Ellis as station announcer
- Mackenzie Ward as the photographer
- Meadows White as Guv'nor
- Gabrielle Brune as the crooner
- Ronnie Harris as Dan
- Diana Hope as a customer
- Dudley Jones as Bleddyn
- David Davies as the burly stranger
- Tom Jones as elderly miner
- Richard Littledale as cinema manager

== Production ==
All the music in this film is based on traditional Welsh songs.

Much of it was filmed on location in London. Nant-y-Moel was used for scenes of the Welsh village's railway station. There are a number of joking references to the deprivations and regulations of postwar England.

Hafoduwchbenceubwllymarchogcoch: Hafod uwchben ceubwll y marchog coch translates roughly as 'Shed over the cess-pit of the red knight'.

== Reception ==
The Monthly Film Bulletin wrote: "Ealing have still, however, to find a true comic style – the comedy of A Run for your Money, like its predecessors, is a little uncertain and not sure of its level, there are some quite unfunny moments, obvious jokes, and false steps, and the chase at the end of the film is neither exciting nor hilarious – it is in fact interrupted by some sentimental Welsh singing at a cinema talent competition. Nevertheless by not aiming very high, this succeeds in being an agreeable and entertaining film."

Kine Weekly wrote: "Clever and exuberant fun, it should be readily appreciated by all classes and both sexes. ... Donald Houston is likeable and not too gullible as Dai, Meredith Edwards draws good character as Twm, and Moira Lister has a way with her as Jo, but it is Hugh Griffith, as Huw, and Alec Guinness, as Mr. Whimple, who steal the honours. ..The film succeeds in giving a new slant to the time-honoured 'innocents abroad' theme and makes its point without undue exaggeration. The adventures and misadventures of the brothers, briskly depicted against a colourful London kaleidoscope, not only firmly interlock, but pave the way to a rollicking hue and cry climax."

Picture Show wrote: "Here is another entertaining film from the Ealing Studios. It has neither the hilarious fun of Passport to Pimlico nor the sophisticated satire of Kind Hearts and Coronets, but it is delightfully and pleasantly amusing. ... It pokes fun at Welsh and English alike, is acted with zest and deftly directed."

Variety wrote: "Characters are realistically depicted, with humor mainly derived from situations rather than personalities. Donald Houston and Meredith Edwards make good contrasts as the straying sheep and Moira Lister carefully underplays the role of the ensnaring femme. Alec Guinness gives a gem of a performance as the reluctant newshound turned cicerone and Joyce Grenfell turns in one of her inimitable cameos as a gushing saleswoman."

In his 1999 obituary of Meredith Edwards, Meic Stephens wrote in The Independent: "Now the Welsh are notoriously difficult to please when it comes to seeing themselves on film and many found A Run For Your Money, which Ealing intended to be the Welsh equivalent of Whisky Galore, too simplistic and, at worst, patronising. The film does have some nice comic touches, however, as when a voice over the loudspeaker at Paddington asks Mr Thomas Jones and Mr David Jones to come to the stationmaster's office, and a horde of leek- bedecked fans answer to these archetypal Welsh names."

== Accolades ==
The film was nominated for a BAFTA award for Best British Film in 1950.
