= Michael Balcon =

English film producer (1896–1977)

Sir Michael Balcon
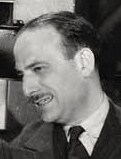
- Balcon in 1935
- Born: Michael Elias Balcon; 19 May 1896; Birmingham, Warwickshire, England
- Died: 17 October 1977 (aged 81); Hartfield, East Sussex, England
- Occupation: Film producer
- Spouse: Aileen Freda Leatherman (m. 1924)
- Children: 2, including Jill Balcon
- Relatives: Daniel Day-Lewis (grandson); Tamasin Day-Lewis (granddaughter)

Sir Michael Elias Balcon (19 May 1896 – 17 October 1977) was an English film producer known for his leadership of Ealing Studios in west London from 1938 to 1956. Under his direction, the studio became one of the most important British film studios of the day. In an industry short of Hollywood-style moguls, Balcon emerged as a key figure, and an obdurately British one too, in his benevolent, somewhat headmasterly approach to the running of a creative organization. He is known for his leadership, and his guidance of young Alfred Hitchcock.

Balcon had earlier co-founded Gainsborough Pictures with Victor Saville in 1923, later working with Gaumont British, which absorbed their studio. Later still he worked with MGM-British. In 1956 he founded a production company known as Ealing Films, and later headed British Lion Films. He served as chairman of the British Film Institute production board to help fund and encourage new work.

Balcon was described in his obituary in The Times as a "pioneer of British films" who "had courage, energy and flair for showmanship".

== Background ==
Born at Edgbaston, Birmingham, Balcon was the youngest son and fourth of five children of Louis Balcon c. 1858–1946 and his wife, Laura (née Greenberg; c. 1863–1934), Lithuanian Jewish immigrants from Latvia (then part of the Russian Empire) who had met in Britain. His father described himself as a tailor, but rarely worked in that capacity; he "preferred to travel", including to South Africa, where his brother-in-law had settled. His wife was left to raise the children as best she could, but the family experienced poverty. Despite what he called a "respectable but impoverished" childhood, in 1907 Balcon won a scholarship to Birmingham's George Dixon Grammar School, where he had an "undistinguished" academic career, and had to leave in 1913 owing to his family's financial needs. A commemorative plaque was subsequently placed at George Dixon Grammar School, marking his notability as a film producer. He worked as a jeweller's apprentice, was turned down for service in the First World War because of defective eyesight, and joined the Dunlop Rubber Company's huge plant at Aston Cross in 1915, rising to become personal assistant to the managing director.

== Filmography ==
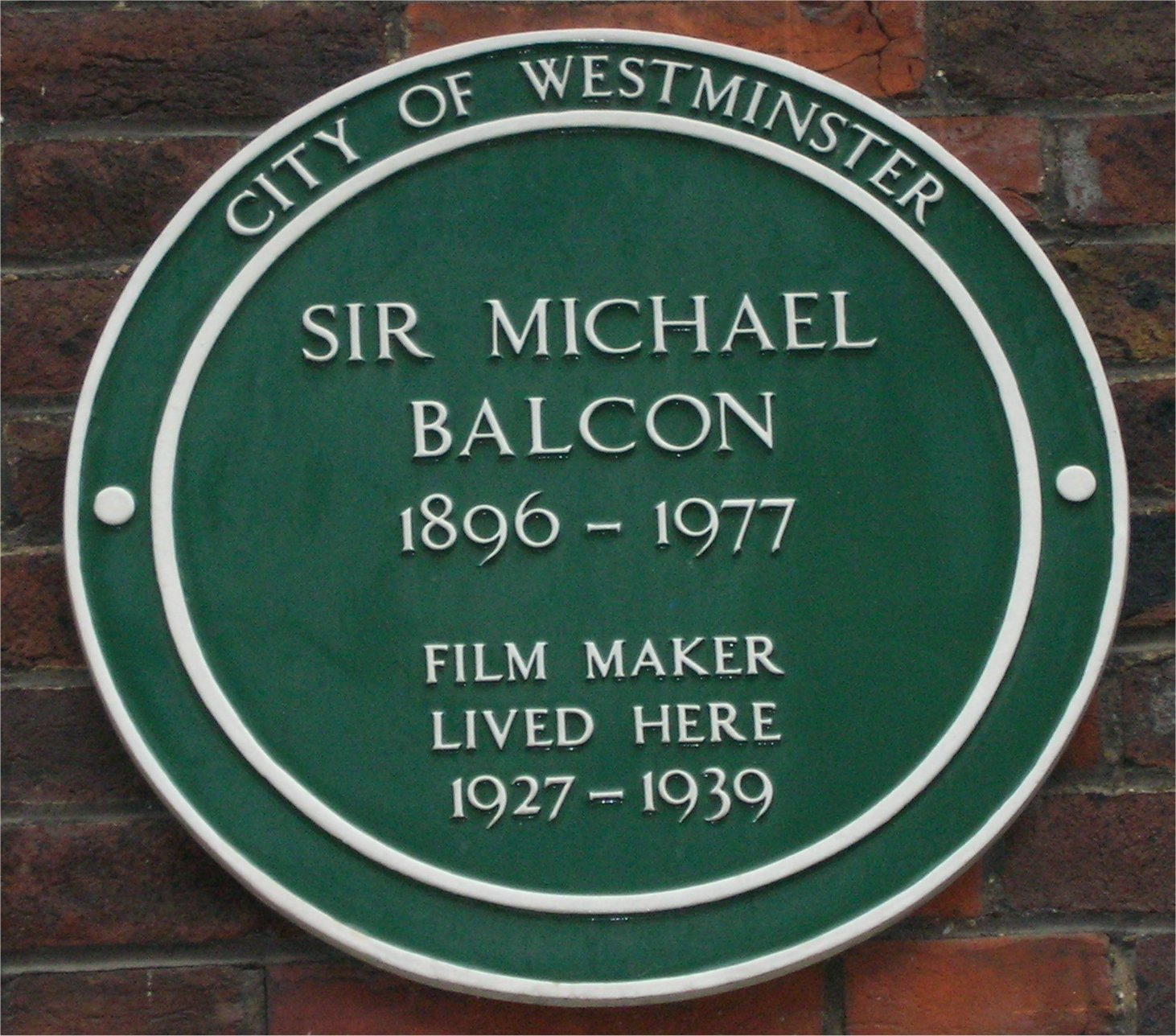
Green plaque on Balcon's house in Tufton Street, Westminster

Balcon began his career in filmmaking during the 1920s and, together with Victor Saville and John Freedman, he formed Balcon, Freedman & Saville. After the war, Balcon's friend Victor Saville suggested a partnership to establish a film distribution company for the new and growing industry. The company, Victory Motion Pictures, led to them settling in London, opening an office in Soho in 1921. In 1923, their first feature film was released, the successful melodrama Woman to Woman, starring Clive Brook and Betty Compson, and directed by Graham Cutts. They leased Islington Studios and formed the more long-lasting Gainsborough Pictures.

The studio, recently vacated by the Hollywood company Famous Players–Lasky (later Paramount Pictures) was small but well equipped and fully staffed. A young Alfred Hitchcock was one of its employees. Balcon gave Hitchcock his first directing opportunity, and Gainsborough gained a reputation for producing high-quality films.

=== Balcon and Hitchcock ===
In 1924, he and Graham Cutts founded Gainsborough Pictures, which he presided over for twelve years, as director of production for Gaumont-British from 1931. During this time, Balcon oversaw Alfred Hitchcock's very first production titled The Pleasure Garden. The film was followed by Hitchcock's The Lodger: A Story of the London Fog as well as The Ring showing that Hitchcock's talent was growing and diversifying. At first, Balcon was doubtful about 'The Lodger' but after a re-edit by Ivor Montagu, he became confident in the production.

Balcon's independence had eroded and Gainsborough became an extension of Gaumont-British. Still, between 1931 and 1936, Balcon produced a number of classics, including a string of Hitchcock successes, such as The 39 Steps and Man of Aran; directed by Robert J. Flaherty the latter was known as 'Balcon's folly' for going well over budget.

He also helped individuals escape Nazi Germany as persecution of Jewish citizens increased, including the actor Conrad Veidt, who had starred in his 1934 film Jew Suss. By 1936, Gaumont was looking for an entry into the American market. Balcon spent several months in the United States forming links with the big Hollywood studios.

On his return, he found Gaumont in financial ruin and joined MGM-British Studios that November. His assistant Edward Black took over the studio. The year and a half Balcon spent at MGM British was a trying period for Balcon, who clashed frequently with studio head Louis B. Mayer. During this period, Balcon lived at 57a Tufton Street, Westminster. Today a commemorative plaque marks his former home.

== Ealing Studios ==
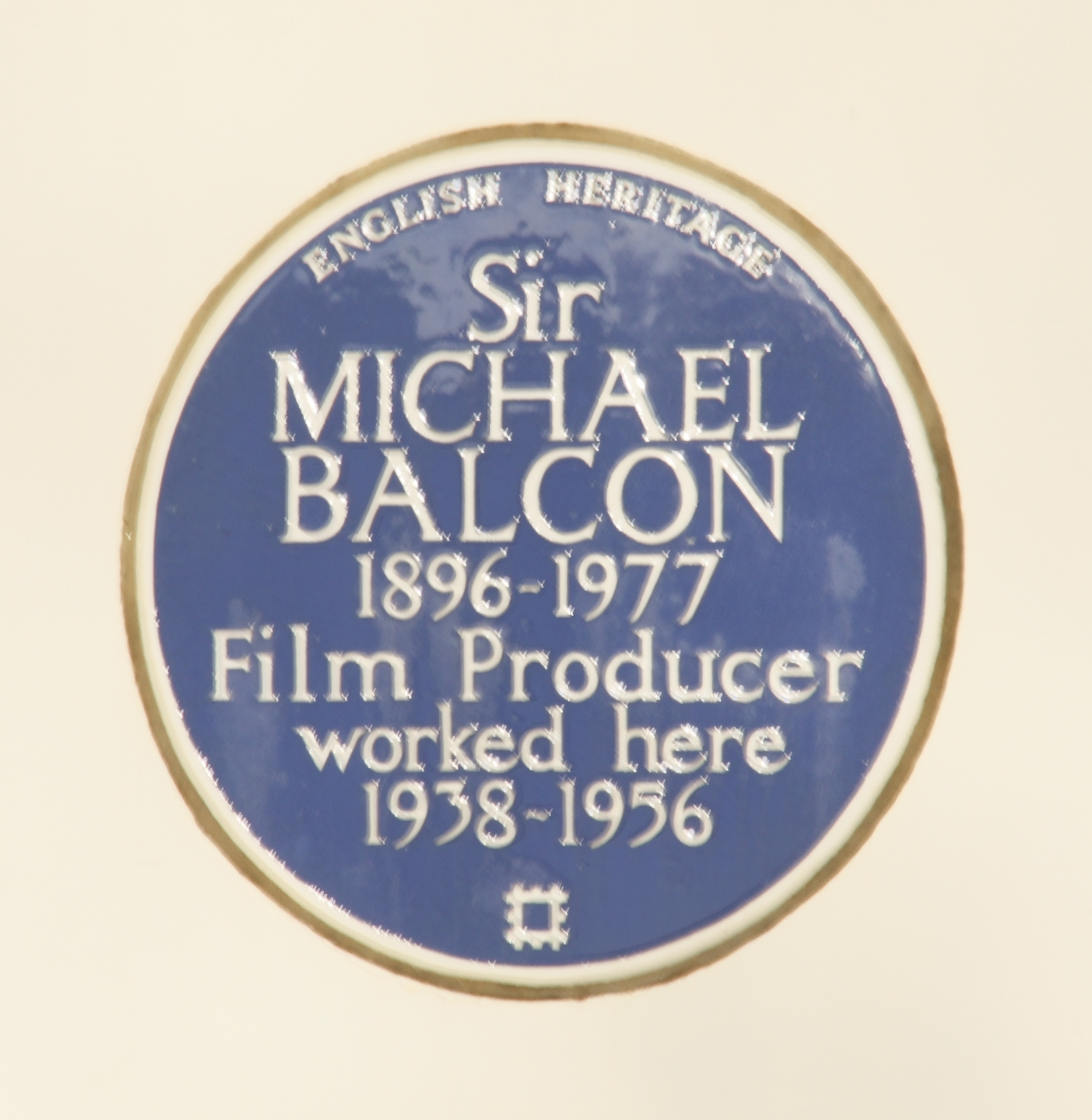
English Heritage blue plaque on the front wall of the White Lodge at Ealing Studios, Ealing Green.

When Balcon was invited by an associate of his, Reginald Baker, to head Ealing Studios in 1938, he agreed. Under his leadership and his team of directors, writers, technicians and actors, Ealing became the most famous British studio in the world, despite turning out no more than six feature films a year.

Went the Day Well?, Dead of Night, Undercover (1943), and the Ealing Comedies were released during his time there. Other films from the studio include Dance Hall (1950) with Petula Clark and Diana Dors; and The Blue Lamp (also 1950), whose lead character, George Dixon, was named after Balcon's grammar school. This character was later used in the long-running television drama Dixon of Dock Green.

In his 1969 autobiography, Michael Balcon Presents… A Lifetime of Films, he wrote that his years at Ealing Studios were "the most rewarding years in my personal career, and perhaps one of the most fruitful periods in the history of British film production."

Besides Hitchcock, Balcon worked with Basil Dearden, Michael Relph and many other significant figures of British film. He was knighted in 1948 for his services to the industry.

In 1944, Ealing Studios was taken over by the Rank Organisation. In 1955 Rank sold the studio to the BBC. As a result, Balcon left Rank in 1956 and set up the production company Ealing Films, striking a distribution and production deal with MGM. Balcon's company would shoot films at MGM-British Studios in Borehamwood and MGM would handle the worldwide distribution of the films.

In 1959, Balcon became chairman of Bryanston Films, a subsidiary of British Lion Films. The firm went bankrupt in 1963. Balcon took over British Lion Films.

He was proud to be associated with the British New Wave; the last film on which he worked as executive producer was Tom Jones (1963), after which he continued to encourage young directors, serving as chairman of the British Film Institute production board and funding low-budget experimental work. He was later appointed to the Board of Governors of the British Film Institute.

=== Famous Ealing Studios films ===
- San Demetrio London (d. Charles Frend, 1943)
- Champagne Charlie (d. Alberto Cavalcanti, 1944)
- The Overlanders (1946)
- Hue and Cry (d. Charles Crichton, 1946)
- Saraband for Dead Lovers (d. Basil Dearden, 1948)
- Scott of the Antarctic (d. Charles Frend, 1948)
- The Blue Lamp (d. Basil Dearden, 1949)
- Kind Hearts and Coronets (d. Robert Hamer, 1949)
- Eureka Stockade (1949)
- The Man in the White Suit (d. Alexander Mackendrick, 1951)
- The Cruel Sea (d. Charles Frend, 1952)
- The Ladykillers (d. Alexander Mackendrick, 1955)

== Publications ==
Balcon published one book and many articles, including:

- Realism or Tinsel? (1943)
- The Producer (1945)
- Twenty Years of British Film 1925–1945 (1947)
- Film Production and Management (1950)
- Michael Balcon Presents… A Lifetime of Films (1969) (his autobiography)

== Legacy ==
A pub in Ealing is named in his honour. The BAFTA for Outstanding Contribution to British Film is presented every year in honour of Balcon's memory.

In 1938, Balcon wrote an article in The Cine-Technician, the journal of the filmmakers union, titled 'I wish I could join' in which he criticised the working condition under which films were made and was instrumental in improving these conditions and increasing the salaries of people working on film sets.

Balcon was knighted in 1948.

== Personal life ==
On 10 April 1924, Balcon married Aileen Freda Leatherman (1904–1988), daughter of Max Jacobs and Beatrice Leatherman, whose families were Jewish immigrants from Poland. She was born in Middlesex, but brought up in Johannesburg, South Africa. The couple enjoyed theatre and opera, loved travel (especially to Italy), and had a wide circle of friends. Lady Balcon was one of a series of society beauties photographed as classical figures by Madame Yevonde. They had two children: Jill (1925–2009), and Jonathan (1931–2012).

In 1946, Aileen was appointed an MBE for her war work.

Their daughter Jill Balcon became an actress. She met Anglo-Irish poet, Cecil Day-Lewis, and the two started a relationship, marrying in 1951. (He was twenty years older than she and already married when they met. He had two teenage sons, and a mistress.) Michael Balcon was deeply unhappy about the marriage, and became estranged from his daughter as a result.

In 1977, Balcon died at Upper Parrock, a 15th-century house set on a Sussex hilltop near the Kent border. He and his wife had lived there since the Second World War. He was cremated and his ashes buried there.

He was a life-long friend of director Charles Frend with whom he collaborated on a number of Ealing Studio films.

== Selected filmography ==
=== Producer ===
Year	Film	Notes
1933	I Was a Spy	
1933	Leave It to Smith	
1933	The Constant Nymph	
1934	Princess Charming	
1934	Evergreen	(uncredited)
1934	Along Came Sally	(uncredited)
1935	The 39 Steps	
1935	Stormy Weather	
1935	Things Are Looking Up	
1936	The First Offence	
1936	Secret Agent	
1936	Tudor Rose	
1937	Doctor Syn	(uncredited)
1938	A Yank at Oxford	
1940	The Proud Valley	
1941	The Ghost of St. Michael's	
1941	Turned Out Nice Again	
1942	The Foreman Went to France	
1942	Went the Day Well?	
1944	For Those in Peril	
1944	Champagne Charlie	
1944	The Halfway House	
1945	Dead of Night	
1945	Pink String and Sealing Wax	
1946	The Captive Heart	
1946	The Overlanders	
1947	Hue and Cry	
1947	It Always Rains on Sunday	
1948	Saraband for Dead Lovers	
1948	Scott of the Antarctic	
1949	Whisky Galore!	
1949	A Run for Your Money	
1949	Kind Hearts and Coronets	
1949	Passport to Pimlico	
1950	The Magnet	
1950	The Blue Lamp	
1951	The Lavender Hill Mob	
1951	The Man in the White Suit	
1952	Mandy	
1953	The Cruel Sea	
1954	The Maggie	
1955	The Ladykillers	
1955	The Night My Number Came Up	
1956	The Long Arm	
1957	The Shiralee	
1957	All at Sea	
1958	Dunkirk	
1959	The Siege of Pinchgut	
1959	The Scapegoat	
1961	The Long and the Short and the Tall	
