= Sally in Our Alley (1931 film) =

British romantic comedy

- Directed by: Maurice Elvey
- Written by: Miles Malleson; Archie Pitt; Alma Reville
- Based on: The Likes of Her by Charles McEvoy
- Produced by: Basil Dean
- Starring: Gracie Fields; Ian Hunter; Florence Desmond; Gibb McLaughlin
- Cinematography: Alex Bryce; Robert Martin
- Edited by: Otto Ludwig
- Music by: Ernest Irving
- Production company: Associated Talking Pictures
- Distributed by: RKO Pictures
- Release date: 9 July 1931
- Running time: 74 minutes
- Country: United Kingdom
- Language: English

Sally in Our Alley is a 1931 British romantic comedy drama film directed by Maurice Elvey and starring Gracie Fields, Ian Hunter, and Florence Desmond. It was written by Miles Malleson, Archie Pitt and Alma Reville based on the 1923 West End play The Likes of Her by Charles McEvoy.

== Plot summary ==
A British soldier goes off to fight in the First World War, with his girlfriend waiting and worried at home. He is soon wounded in battle and crippled. He comes to the conclusion that she would be better off believing that he has been killed so she can get on with her life. She gets the news and is devastated. Several years later she is still grieving for him, but he has now been cured and goes looking for her.

== Cast ==
- Gracie Fields as Sally Winch
- Ian Hunter as George Miles
- Florence Desmond as Florrie Small
- Ivor Barnard as Tod Small
- Fred Groves as Alf Cope
- Gibb McLaughlin as Jim Sears
- Ben Field as Sam Bilson
- Barbara Gott as Mrs Pool
- Renée Macready as Lady Daphne
- Helen Ferrers as Duchess of Wexford

== Production ==
Shooting for the film started on 23 March 1931 at Beaconsfield Studios by Associated Talking Pictures, who relocated to Ealing Studios the following year. Shooting lasted six weeks, concluding in early May. It marked the screen debut of Gracie Fields who was an established music hall star. Fields' husband, the screenwriter Archie Pitt was originally set to play the role of Alf Cope. However, after less than a week of filming, as Fields and Pitt were travelling back from shooting, their car crashed. Though Fields escaped injury, Pitt was forced to withdraw from the cast in order to recuperate. Due to his experience and availability, the role was quickly recast with Fred Groves. The film incorporated Fields' hugely popular signature song, Sally, itself a reference to Henry Carey's 1725 song, Sally in Our Alley, which had long been a traditional English country dance. It included the first use of the Dunning Process in Britain.

The film took £100,000 at the box office, establishing Fields as a national film star.

The film's sets were designed by the art director Norman G. Arnold.

== Critical reception ==
Kine Weekly wrote: "This sentimental drama of Cockney life, freely adapted from the stage play, "The Likes of 'Er," has a scrappy story, and it does not provide Gracie Fields with an outstanding vehicle for her film debut, but she is too clever an entertainer to let the inadequate material seriously cramp her style. Whether clowning, sentimentalising or singing, she knows how to reach her audience, and puts herself over well. The picture begins and ends with Gracie Fields, and its success, which is assured from the start, lies in her pull. Unquestionably a box-office attraction."

Variety said: "Better than most English films and enhanced for the provinces by the presence of Gracie Fields. Songs are not particularly impressive and the general standard nothing to shout about. As a film proposition Miss Fields doesn't exactly suggest sufficient sympathy to hold the romantic lead, but her eccentric singing and dialect gagging records well and should get a good quota of laughs from her fans over here. Introduction of the songs is resourceful and some of the gags are quite good. Dialog is pert on English comedy lines. But the whole canvas is very small and the footage seems very long."

In British Sound Films: The Studio Years 1928–1959 David Quinlan rated the film as "mediocre" and wrote: ''A shaky start which Gracie Fields screen career did well to survive.''

Leslie Halliwell wrote: "Poor girl loves wounded soldier. Early talkie drama which made Gracie Fields a star and gave her a theme song."

The Radio Times Guide to Films gave the film 1/5 stars, writing: "Of interest only to historians or those addicted to "Our Gracie", this worse-than-mediocre film made Gracie Fields a star and gave her her lifelong signature song, Sally."

== Home media ==
This film was released in the UK as part of the Gracie Fields collector's edition DVD box set in 2008, which in addition to this film includes Looking on the Bright Side (1932), Love, Life and Laughter (1934), Sing As We Go (1934), Look Up and Laugh (1935), Queen of Hearts (1936) and The Show Goes On (1937). A Blu-ray standalone version followed in 2020, restored from a 35mm fine grain master print.
