= Look Up and Laugh =

- Directed by: Basil Dean
- Written by: J. B. Priestley; Gordon Wellesley
- Produced by: Basil Dean
- Starring: Gracie Fields; Alfred Drayton; Douglas Wakefield; Vivien Leigh
- Cinematography: Robert Martin
- Edited by: Jack Kitchin
- Music by: Ernest Irving
- Production company: Associated Talking Pictures
- Distributed by: ABFD (UK)
- Release date: June 1935
- Running time: 80 minutes
- Language: English

Look Up and Laugh is a 1935 British comedy film directed by Basil Dean and starring Gracie Fields, Alfred Drayton and Douglas Wakefield. The film is notable for featuring an appearance by Vivien Leigh in an early supporting role.

== Plot ==
Gracie Pearson (Fields) is a singer/comedian who returns home to enjoy a little holiday, but there is trouble brewing. First, she has to use all of her hard-earned money to pay for part of what her brother owes to a money lender. Then when they go to see their father, they find he has collapsed due to the Plumborough Market (where he has a stall) is threatened with demolition to make way for a department store. She receives a telegram offering a West End singing job, but decides to try to save the market instead.

As time runs out, Gracie rallies the stall keepers together through a series of ever more hilarious schemes in their attempts to save their livelihoods.

== Cast ==
- Gracie Fields as Gracie Pearson
- Vivien Leigh as Marjorie Belfer
- Douglas Wakefield as Joe Chirk
- Alfred Drayton as Belfer
- Billy Nelson as Alf Chirk
- Harry Tate as Turnpenny
- Huntley Wright as Ketley
- Robb Wilton as Mayor
- Morris Harvey as Rosenbloom
- Maud Gill as Miss Canvey
- Norman Walker as Brierley
- Tommy Fields as Sidney Pearson
- Helen Ferrers as Lady Buster
- Kenneth Kove as Piano Assistant
- D. J. Williams as Malpas

Uncredited:

- Frank Atkinson as Debt Collector
- Florence Gregson as Mr. Pearson's Housekeeper
- Arthur Hambling as Sam
- James Harcourt as Mr. Pearson
- Anthony Holles as Store Manager
- Mike Johnson as Man Outside Market
- Jack Melford as Journalist
- Kenneth More in a bit part
- Ernest Sefton as Borough Engineer

== Reception ==
Writing for The Spectator, Graham Greene described the film as "light [with] a pleasant local flavour" the plot of which is "genuinely provincial". Greene praised Priestley's writing and opined that the film distinguishes itself "by the sense that a man's observation and experience, as well as his invention, has gone into its making".

== Home media ==
This film was released as part of the Gracie Fields collector's edition which also includes the films Sally in Our Alley (1931), Looking on the Bright Side (1932), Love, Life and Laughter (1934), Sing As We Go (1934), Queen of Hearts and The Show Goes On (1937), these are on 4 discs. Two films each on three of the discs with the other film on disc four.
