= Looking on the Bright Side =

1932 film

Looking on The Bright Side
- Directed by: Graham Cutts; Basil Dean
- Written by: Basil Dean; Brock Williams; Archie Pitt
- Produced by: Basil Dean
- Starring: Gracie Fields; Richard Dolman; Julian Rose
- Cinematography: Robert Martin
- Edited by: Otto Ludwig
- Music by: Carroll Gibbons
- Production company: Associated Talking Pictures
- Distributed by: RKO Pictures
- Release date: 15 September 1932
- Running time: 81 minutes
- Country: United Kingdom
- Language: English

Looking on The Bright Side is a 1932 British musical comedy film directed by Graham Cutts and Basil Dean and starring Gracie Fields, Richard Dolman and Julian Rose. It was written by Dean, Brock Williams and Archie Pitt.

== Plot summary ==
Gracie and Laurieb are lovers who together form a musical act. Gracie sings and Laurie writes the songs, but when Laurie gets a taste of fame, he runs off after a glamorous actress.

== Cast ==
- Gracie Fields as Gracie
- Richard Dolman as Laurie
- Julian Rose as Oscar Schultz
- Wyn Richmond as Josie Joy
- Tony De Lungo as Delmonico
- Betty Shale as Hetty Hunt
- Viola Compton as Police Sergeant
- Bettina Montahners as Bettina
- Charles Farrell as released criminal

== Reception ==
Film Weekly wrote: "Gracie Fields lets herself go in another popular medley of song and sentiment – a cross between a film and a music-hall show – which is certain to please her many admirers. Its appeal to others is strictly limited by the naiveté and sentimentality of its theme. ... It is astonishing how much humour and sentiment, of her own special type, the irrepressible Gracie extracts from this slender stuff. She sings four songs, including her stage success, "He's dead, but he won't lie down," and does some quite good character acting into the bargain. The best of the supporting cast is Julian Rose, whose Jewish comedy singles him out as an acquisition to British films."

Kine Weekly wrote: "Romantic comedy-drama, well seasoned with song, a simple, transparent picture made and held together by the artistry of Gracie Fields, who not only knows her audience, but what to give them, and how. No great originality is displayed in the treatment, but music, song and action blend with easy harmony, and the result is rousing entertainment for the majority. ... Gracie Fields is a trifle mature for the role of Gracie, but her tremendous personality, rich sense of humour and vocal acrobatics make her an entertainer of exceptional ability and well-deserved popularity."

Picturegoer wrote: "Just as in her first talkie, Sally in Our Alley, Gracie Fields dominates this picture with her magnetic personality, full sense of humour, and curiously fascinating vocal gymnastics. But it is a better picture than her first. The story, concerning a manicurist (Gracie) and a young hairdresser, Laurie, who form a romantic attachment because of her love of singing and his love of composition and after a few wvicissitudes are eligible for the marriage market, is slight. It is, however, well blended with music cleverly set and designed to give the star the full scope for, putting over vocal numbers to the best effect. The supporting cast do well, and especially notable is the first screen appearance of that popular radio and music-hall Jewish comedian, Julian Rose. His performance as a theatrical agent is excellent, and he may well be hailed as one of the 'finds' of the year for British screens."

== Home media ==
The film was released on DVD as part of the Gracie Fields 4-disc collector's edition which, in addition to this film, includes the films Sally in Our Alley (1931), Love, Life and Laughter (1934), Sing As We Go (1934), Look Up and Laugh (1935), Queen of Hearts (1936) and The Show Goes On (1937).
