= Norman Walker (bass) =

English bass singer (1907–1963)

Norman Walker (24 November 1907 – 5 November 1963) was an English bass singer, distinguished for his work in both opera and oratorio.

== Early development ==
Walker was born into a musical family in Shaw, Lancashire, England. His father played trombone in an amateur brass band, and his mother was an amateur soprano. A choirboy in the parish church, he continued his musical studies when he went to work in a cotton mill on leaving school. By the age of fifteen and a half he already had a deep bass voice, which he used at the evening institute where he studied harmony. At the age of 17 he made his first public performance as a soloist in a concert programme including Handel arias. When he was eighteen he was heard by Mrs Percy Pitt, wife of the conductor, and went to Laurence Lee for a year's training. While still working in a cotton mill he began to appear in Gilbert and Sullivan productions and other light opera.

== College, Guildhall and film roles ==
He won a scholarship to the Royal Manchester College of Music in 1929, and studied singing there for three years under Richard Evans. He took parts in college opera productions, notably The Magic Flute, and won the Curtis Gold Medal. Walker was then keen to go to London. He sang for Landon Ronald, and was awarded the Heilbut Major scholarship to the Guildhall School of Music, where he studied with the tenor Walter Hyde. In their production of Autumn Crocus he was heard by Basil Dean, who engaged him for films such as Java Head, Sing As We Go and Look up and Laugh (with Gracie Fields), and Whom the Gods Love (a film about the life of Mozart).

== Concert, broadcast, and Covent Garden ==
Norman Walker's first appearance with the Hallé Orchestra and Choir was in the Bach Mass in B minor in 1933. The first of many oratorio performances, this led to an appearance in the Verdi Requiem at the Queen's Hall for the Royal Philharmonic Society under Thomas Beecham in 1935. In the same year he made his first important radio broadcast, and first appeared in the international seasons at the Royal Opera House, Covent Garden. After two years or so in minor roles, he sang the roles of King Mark in Tristan und Isolde, Gurnemanz in Parsifal and the Commendatore in Don Giovanni. He also took the role of the King in Verdi's Aida in a cast including Beniamino Gigli. He married the New Zealand-born mezzo-soprano and pianist Merle Miller in October 1938. They had four children: Malcolm (born 1940), Nigel (1941–1947), Douglas (1944–2019) and Elspeth (born 1948).

== The War and after ==
In 1941 he was commissioned in the RAF and served as a Flying Control Officer until demobilised as a Flight Lieutenant in November 1945. During that time he received a Fellowship of the Royal Manchester College of Music (1941) and a Fellowship of the Guildhall School of Music in 1945. After the War he returned to Covent Garden in February 1948 and was a member of the company for four seasons and appeared during the 1952/53 season as a guest. He was much admired as King Mark in Tristan und Isolde and created the role of the Evangelist in the première of Ralph Vaughan Williams's The Pilgrim's Progress, and sang with Sadler's Wells Opera, Jay Pomeroy's company at the Cambridge Theatre and at Glyndebourne, but devoted himself increasingly to oratorio, including the major works of Bach, Handel and Elgar. He also gave BBC broadcasts of lieder. In 1952 he toured Australia and New Zealand.

Walker suffered a stroke in 1955 and retired from singing on the stage but continued to broadcast. He taught at the Guildhall School of Music from 1951 until his death, his students including Ian Partridge, Elizabeth Bainbridge, Janet Coster, John Dobson, Anne Pashley, John Heddle Nash, Paschal Allen and Lawrence Richard.

His son is the recording historian, magazine editor and discographer Malcolm Walker (born 16 May 1940).

He died in London on 5 November 1963.

== Sources ==
- D. Brook, Singers of Today (Revised Edition – Rockliff, London 1958), 195–197.
- New Grove Dictionary of Opera, vol 4, p. 1090
