= Autumn Crocus =

Autumn Crocus may refer to:

- Several species of flowering plant:
  - Plants in the genus Crocus which bloom in autumn
    - Crocus nudiflorus
    - Crocus sativus
  - the meadow saffron Colchicum autumnale, which is also known as autumn crocus
- Autumn Crocus (play), a 1931 play by Dodie Smith
- Autumn Crocus (film), a 1934 film adaptation
