= Thorold Dickinson =

British film maker (1903–1984)

- Born: Thorold Barron Dickinson; 16 November 1903; Bristol, England, United Kingdom
- Died: 14 April 1984 (aged 80); Oxford, England, United Kingdom
- Occupations: Film director, screenwriter, film editor, film producer, educator
- Years active: 1930–1958

Thorold Barron Dickinson CBE (16 November 1903 – 14 April 1984) was a British film director, screenwriter, film editor, film producer, and Britain's first university professor of film. Dickinson's work received much praise, with fellow director Martin Scorsese describing him as "a uniquely intelligent, passionate artist... They're not in endless supply."

== Early life ==
Of Norwegian descent, his father was the Archdeacon of Bristol from 1921 to 1927, Dickinson was educated at Clifton College and Keble College, Oxford where he read theology, history and French. He was sent down from Oxford in his last year because his interest in theatre and film caused him to neglect his studies; he was inspired by lectures given by Edward Gordon Craig. During his time at Oxford, he interrupted his studies to observe the film industry in France, where he worked with George Pearson, the father of an Oxford friend. For Pearson he wrote the scenario of The Little People (1926). Following this, he observed the American industry's transition to sound in New York in 1929. In the 1920s and 1930s he was active in the London Film Society, being responsible for the technical presentation of films. At the LFS, he helped introduce the work of the Soviet directors Sergei Eisenstein and Dziga Vertov to British audiences and, in 1937, staged a notable programme protesting the Italian invasion of Abyssinia, Record of War.

== Career ==
Dickinson worked as a film editor on such features as Love's Option (1928), Auld Lang Syne (1929), Loyalties (1933) and Sing As We Go! (1934). His first directorial experience was on Java Head (1934), when he took over after J. Walter Ruben became ill and was unable to continue. He became Vice-President of the Association of Cine-Technicians in 1936, observing the Soviet film industry for the craft union the following year, remaining in the post until 1953.

Dickinson's first feature film, starring Lionel Atwill and Lucie Mannheim, was The High Command (1937), for which he formed the short-lived Fanfare Pictures with Gordon Wellesley. He visited Spain during the Civil War and made two documentary shorts, one of which, Spanish ABC (1938) "is a sober advocacy of the educational policy of Republican Spain". At short notice, Dickinson took over direction of Gaslight (1940). Based on the Patrick Hamilton play, it was later suppressed for some years when MGM bought the rights for its own version, but led to an invitation to work in Hollywood from David O. Selznick which was rejected by Dickinson.

A film biography of Disraeli, The Prime Minister (1941), starring John Gielgud, was disowned by its director, but The Next of Kin (1942), expanded from what was originally intended as a training film, is described by Philip Horne as "one of the most interesting, and thrillingly ruthless, propaganda films of the War". Men of Two Worlds (1946), from a script by novelist Joyce Cary starring Robert Adams, attempted to "tell an African story from the point of view of an African". It was, though, a difficult production; the crew lost equipment and film stock.

For The Queen of Spades (1949) Dickinson assumed responsibility at five days' notice after he was recommended by actor Anton Walbrook, the star of Gaslight, when the production was close to collapse. Following an aborted attempt to adapt Thomas Hardy's The Mayor of Casterbridge in time for the Festival of Britain, he returned to Secret People (1952), a long cherished project which Ealing Studios took up, but this was unsuccessful at the box-office and became Dickinson's last British-made feature film.

Secret People was notable for providing Audrey Hepburn with her first supporting film role, in which she performed all her own ballet moves during the dance sequences. Dickinson went on to film the screen test of Audrey, which led to international stardom. In the screen test, she describes how she used to dance for audiences to raise funds for the resistance in the Netherlands during the Second World War. The screen test was sent to director William Wyler and led to her casting as Princess Ann in Roman Holiday.

In Israel, Dickinson directed a short film for the Israeli Army, The Red Ground (1953), and an English-language feature, Hill 24 Doesn't Answer (1955), for which he reworked the screenplay in collaboration with his wife, Joanna. Dickinson's other work outside the UK included a tenure with the United Nations Department of Public Information as Chief of Film Services from 1956 to 1960. In 1959 he was a member of the jury at the 1st Moscow International Film Festival.

After his work with the United Nations, Dickinson devoted the final part of his life to teaching about film. In 1960 he established the film studies department at the Slade School of Fine Art, University College London, where one of his first students was Raymond Durgnat, the prominent film critic. Others included Marco Bellocchio and Maysoon Pachachi. In 1967 he was head of the jury at the 17th Berlin International Film Festival. In the same year, he was named a professor in the department, becoming the first professor of film studies in the UK. He served in the post until 1971. He was appointed CBE in the 1973 Birthday Honours.

The Thorold Dickinson Archive is held at the University of the Arts London's Archives and Special Collections Centre.

== Partial filmography ==
- Love's Option (editor, 1928)
- The School for Scandal (1930, editor)
- Tilly of Bloomsbury (1931, editor)
- The Sport of Kings (1931)
- Shikari (1932)
- The First Mrs. Fraser (1932)
- Loyalties (1933)
- Java Head (editor, part directed, 1934)
- Sing As We Go (1934)
- Whom the Gods Love (editor, 1936)
- Calling the Tune (1936)
- The High Command (1937)
- The Arsenal Stadium Mystery (1939)
- Gaslight (1940)
- The Prime Minister (1941)
- The Next of Kin (1942)
- Men of Two Worlds (1946)
- The Queen of Spades (1949)
- Secret People (1952, produced and co-wrote)
- Hill 24 Doesn't Answer (1955)
- Overture (1958, producer)
