= Gordon Wellesley =

Australian-born screenwriter and writer of Chinese descent (1894–1980)

Gordon Wong Wellesley (8 December 1894 – 1980) was an Australian-born screenwriter and writer of Chinese descent. Born in Sydney in 1894 He wrote over thirty screenplays in the United States and Britain, often collaborating with the director Carol Reed. He began his career in Hollywood in the early 1930s and worked in Britain beginning about 1935. He was married to the scriptwriter Katherine Strueby. He was nominated for an Oscar for Best Writing, Original Story at the 1942 Oscars for Night Train to Munich, which was based on his novel, Report on a Fugitive.

== Biography ==
=== Early life ===
Gordon Wellesley Wong was born in Australia, of English and Chinese descent and was educated in London.

By 1923 his short stories such as A Lesson in Cocktails were appearing in magazines. A biography around this time called him "one of the best known commercial men in the Federated Malay states."

In 1931 he was living in Kuala Lumpur. (Another article says he was from Singapore.) He was reportedly "a business man as well as a traveler, writer, explorer and official film producer for the Malayan government." A 1931 profile said he was educated at the University of London and had directed a Malayan picture called Black Sands "which created a lot of excitement in Europe".

=== Hollywood ===
He travelled to Hollywood in 1931, when he was 36 years old. He sold the film rights to his novel, Pagan River to Universal. He also sold a story he wrote about the Sino-Japanese war called Shanghai Interlude which was going to be made by director John Ford and star Lew Ayres.

He was using the name "Wong Wellesley" around this time. He says he did this "because with a Chinese surname I might be expected to write nothing but Chinese stories."

Pagan River was filmed as Nagana (1933).

Wellesley also worked on the script for Shanghai Madness (1933) made with Spencer Tracy. In July 1933 he left Los Angeles for London.

=== Britain ===
He moved to Britain in 1933. He wrote scripts for The Right to Live (1933) for Fox, and Over the Garden Wall (1934) for British International Pictures.

=== Associated Talking Pictures ===
Wellesley wrote a series of films for Associated Talking Pictures, the forerunner of Ealing Studios: Love, Life and Laughter (1934) with Gracie Fields and Java Head (1934) with Anna May Wong directed by Thorold Dickinson; the latter had Carol Reed as assistant director. Wellesley wrote a second film for Fields, Sing As We Go (1934), directed by Basil Dean.

Also for Dean he wrote Lorna Doone (1934) and a third with Fields, Look Up and Laugh (1935).

He was loaned out to work on the script for Death Drives Through (1935), independently done at Ealing, then helped write a comedy, No Limit (1935) for a new star, George Formby. It was a big hit and helped turn Formby into a movie star.

Wellesley worked on a biopic of Mozart for Dean, Whom the Gods Love (1936), with Margaret Kennedy, to whom he became close. He did another for Fields, Queen of Hearts (1936). Wellesley wrote Laburnum Grove (1936), directed by Carol Reed and produced by Dean.

=== Producer and Night Train to Munich ===
Wellesley turned producer with The High Command (1937) for director Thorold Dickinson and Fanfare Films.

In early 1939 a short story of his was published, “Report on a Fugitive”. It was bought by 20th Century Fox who turned it into Night Train to Munich (1940), directed by Reed and written by Frank Launder and Sidney Gilliat. The film was very successful in the UK and the US. In February 1942, Wellesley earned an Oscar nomination for his story for Night Train. It was the only nomination given to a British film that year.

Wellesley did some uncredited work on the script Sailors Three (1940) for Ealing. He also helped write Freedom Radio (1941), Atlantic Ferry (1941), and This Was Paris (1942). In 1941 a script was being prepared based on a story of his, Lisbon Clipper.

He wrote two films for Walter Forde at Warners, Flying Fortress (1942) and The Peterville Diamond (1942).

=== Director ===
Wellesley turned director with The Silver Fleet (1942), a film whose storyline was based on a suggestion of President Roosevelt. He wrote and directed it in tandem with Vernon Sewell, replacing Clive Brook, and the film was produced by Powell and Pressburger. According to Sewell Wellesley "wanted to be a director and I said ‘No, co-director out! I won't have it. Only one director.’ So anyway, he had his name put on with me as 'written and directed by' but he wrote the script, he had nothing to do with doing direction in the movie at all."

However Wellesley is credited as sole director on Rhythm Serenade (1943) with Vera Lynn.

Wellesley returned to working just as a writer: The Shipbuilders (1943) and Mr. Emmanuel (1944). A story A Bed in Paradise was discussed as possibly being filmed by Launder and Gilliat in 1947. He worked as story editor for Rank and wrote The Lost People (1949), and The Reluctant Widow (1950) (which he also produced). He ran a program for younger writers including William Rose at Denham Studios.

== Later career ==
He wrote episodes of Douglas Fairbanks Presents as well as the features The Green Scarf (1954) and The March Hare (1956)

Most of his later work was for TV: The Gay Cavalier, White Hunter, The Young Jacobites, International Detective, Sir Francis Drake and Beware of the Dog. He still wrote features such as The Malpas Mystery (1960), Passport to China (1961) (for Hammer), Dead Man's Evidence (1962), and Doomsday at Eleven (1962).

In 1967 he was awarded a Writers Guild Award for distinguished service.

== Selected filmography ==
- Nagana (1933) – writer of original novel
- Shanghai Madness (1933) – writer
- The Right to Live (1933) – writer
- Love, Life and Laughter (1934) – writer
- Over the Garden Wall (1934) – writer
- Java Head (1934) – writer
- Sing As We Go (1934) – script editor
- Lorna Doone (1934) – writer
- Look Up and Laugh (1935) – scenario editor
- Death Drives Through (1935) – scenario editor
- No Limit (1935) – scenario editor
- Whom the Gods Love (1936) – writer
- Queen of Hearts (1936) – scenario editor
- Laburnum Grove (1936) – scenario editor
- The High Command (1936) – producer
- Night Train to Munich (1940) – original story
- Three Cockeyed Sailors (1940) – uncredited contribution to story
- Freedom Radio (1941) aka A Voice in the Night – story
- Atlantic Ferry (1941) – writer
- This Was Paris (1942) – story
- Flying Fortress (1942) – writer
- The Peterville Diamond (1942) – writer
- The Silver Fleet (1943) – co-director, writer
- Rhythm Serenade (1943) aka I Love to Sing- director
- The Shipbuilders (1943) – writer, dialogue editor
- Mr. Emmanuel (1944) – writer
- The Lost People (1949) – producer
- The Reluctant Widow (1950) – writer, producer
- Rheingold Theatre (1953) (TV series) – episode "The Heel" – writer
- The Green Scarf (1954) – writer
- The March Hare (1956) – writer
- The Gay Cavalier (1956–57) (TV series) – writer
- White Hunter (1957) (TV series) – writer
- The Young Jacobites (1960) – writer
- International Detective (1960) (TV series) – writer
- Passport to China (1961) – writer
- Dead Man's Evidence (1962) – script supervisor
- Sir Francis Drake (1962) (TV series) – writer
- Doomsday at Eleven (1962) – director
- Beware of the Dog (1964) (TV series) – writer
- Trouble with Junia (1967) (short) – director
- The Edgar Wallace Mystery Theatre (1967) (TV series) – writer – episode "The Malpas Mystery"

== Other writing ==
- ”A Lesson in Cocktails” (1923) – magazine story
- The Bait (1923) – magazine serial
- ”Anything Might Happen” (1923) – magazine story
- ”The Proper Thing” (1923) – magazine story
- Pagan River (1931) – magazine serial
- ”Report on a Fugitive: A Drama of the Secret Service” (1939) – magazine story
- ”Lisbon Clipper” (1941) – magazine story.
- The Silver Fleet: The Story of the Film Put Into Narrative (1943) – book
- Sex and the Occult (1973) – book
