= The High Command =

- U.S. poster
- Directed by: Thorold Dickinson
- Written by: Walter Meade (dialogue); Katherine Strueby (screenplay); Val Valentine (dialogue)
- Based on: novel The General Goes Too Far by Lewis Robinson
- Produced by: Gordon Wellesley
- Starring: Lionel Atwill; Lucie Mannheim
- Cinematography: Otto Heller
- Edited by: Sidney Cole
- Music by: Ernest Irving
- Production company: Fanfare Pictures
- Distributed by: Associated British Film Distributors (UK)
- Release date: 22 March 1937 (London)
- Running time: 84 minutes
- Country: United Kingdom
- Language: English

The High Command is a 1937 British drama film directed by Thorold Dickinson and starring Lionel Atwill, Lucie Mannheim and James Mason.

It was shot at Ealing Studios and on location on the Gold Coast. The film's sets were designed by the art director Holmes Paul. It is an adaptation of the 1936 novel The General Goes Too Far by Lewis Robinson.

== Plot ==
This is the tale of an English officer who murders a man in Ireland for chivalrous reasons. Years later, he has risen to the rank of Major-General, and is stationed in West Africa. There, his old crime is discovered, and he allows himself to be murdered rather than involve his daughter in his own disgrace.

== Cast ==
- Lionel Atwill as Maj. Gen. Sir John Sangye, VC
- Lucie Mannheim as Diana Cloam
- Steven Geray as Martin Cloam
- James Mason as Capt. Heverell
- Leslie Perrins as Maj. Carson
- Allan Jeayes as H.E., the Governor
- Michael Lambart as Lorne
- Kathleen Gibson as Belinda
- Tom Gill as Daunt
- Wally Patch as Crawford
- Archibald Batty as Capt. Coates (the prosecutor)
- Henry Hewitt as Defence counsel
- Drusilla Wills as Miss Isabella Hobson Tuff
- Cyril Howe as Julius Caesar (servant)
- Evan Thomas as Chief Justice
- Aubrey Pollock as Judge Advocate
- Deering Wells as Escort
- Philip Strange as Maj. Challoner
- Frank Atkinson as Corporal
- Skelton Knaggs as Fazerack

== Reception ==
The Sunday Times wrote of this film: "Its avoidance of reality and its slowness make it a first-class soporific in this sultry weather." Despite the film's faults, the novelist and author Graham Greene opined that the directing work by Thorold Dickinson made the film much better than it otherwise would have been. Greene also pointed out that Fanfare was a newly emerging British film company that was constrained by its budget and that it still managed to use "lyric imagination" to produce memorable scenes well designed to portray the degree of "human crisis" especially at the climax when the General's secret is revealed. Greene described the "glib" review from The Sunday Times as "rather shocking" in light of the production's efforts with their financial limitations.
