= The Impassive Footman =

1932 film

- The servant George Curzon towers over his master Allan Jeayes
- Directed by: Basil Dean
- Written by: Herman C. McNeile (play); Harold Dearden; John Farrow; John Paddy Carstairs
- Produced by: Basil Dean
- Starring: Owen Nares; Betty Stockfeld; Allan Jeayes; George Curzon
- Cinematography: Robert Martin
- Edited by: Otto Ludwig; Ernest Aldridge
- Music by: Ernest Irving
- Production company: Associated Talking Pictures
- Distributed by: RKO Pictures
- Release date: July 1932
- Running time: 70 minutes
- Country: United Kingdom
- Language: English

The Impassive Footman (U.S. title: Woman in Bondage) is a 1932 British drama film directed by Basil Dean and starring Owen Nares, Betty Stockfeld, Allan Jeayes and George Curzon. It was written by Harold Dearden, John Farrow and John Paddy Carstairs based on a play by Herman C. McNeile, and was made as a quota quickie. The film's sets were designed by Edward Carrick.

The film was re-issued in Britain in 1948 and 1956.

== Plot ==
On a cruise ship, Mrs Marwood becomes involved in a platonic relationship with the ship's doctor who treats her hypochondriac husband. This leads to a series of violent quarrels, all witnessed by the family's footman who is the only one who knows entirely what is going on.

== Cast ==
- Owen Nares as Bryan Daventry
- Betty Stockfeld as Grace Marwood
- Allan Jeayes as John Marwood
- George Curzon as Simpson
- Aubrey Mather as Doctor Bartlett
- Frances Rose Campbell as Mrs Angers
- Florence Harwood as Mrs Hoggs

== Reception ==
Film Weekly wrote: "Although its theme, on examination, is bound to appear fantastic, the picture remains plausible by virtue of the smooth direction and capable acting that have gone into it. The players have combined to get 'under the skin' of the characters, and the director and scenarist have made the most of each situation."

Kine Weekly wrote: "This melodrama ... is very well characterised and directed, and cleverly builds up suspense and good drama. It never loses its grip on its audience and represents entertainment of excellent quality."
