= The Right to Live (1933 film) =

- Theatrical release poster
- Directed by: Albert Parker
- Written by: Michael Barringer; Gordon Wellesley; Frank Atkinson; R.J. Davis
- Produced by: Ernest Gartside; Albert Parker
- Starring: Davy Burnaby; Pat Paterson; Francis L. Sullivan
- Production company: Fox-British Pictures
- Distributed by: Fox Film Company
- Release date: 1933
- Running time: 72 minutes
- Country: United Kingdom
- Language: English

The Right to Live is a 1933 British crime film directed by Albert Parker and starring Davy Burnaby, Pat Paterson and Francis L. Sullivan. It was written by Michael Barringer, Gordon Wellesley, Frank Atkinson and R.J. Davis, and was made at Ealing Studios as a quota quickie by the British subsidiary of Fox Film.

== Preservation status ==
The British Film Institute National Archive holds a collection of stills but no film or video materials.

== Premise ==
When chemist Sir George Kessler discovers "Helozone", an antidote to poison gas, the directors of his company agree that it must be used for the greater good of humanity rather than being exploited for commercial gain. However, crook Roger Stoneham hears of the company's breakthrough. He manipulates High Latimer, a Kessler employee over whom he holds some leverage, and subsequently buys up enough shares to secure a controlling interest in the company. Refusing to let Helozone be exploited by profiteers, Sir George resolves to broadcast the chemical formula to the entire world, prompting a desperate Stoneham to decide that the scientist must be permanently silenced.

== Cast ==
- Davy Burnaby as Sir George Kessler
- Pat Paterson as June Kessler
- Richard Bird as Richard Fulton
- Francis L. Sullivan as Roger Stoneham
- Lawrence Anderson as Hugh Latimer
- Frank Atkinson as Harry Woods

== Reception ==
The Daily Film Renter wrote: "Actionful, fast moving, with whole-hearted contributions from major members of cast. Crisp direction, giving sparkle to melodramatic subject. Good feature for all popular patrons."

Picturegoer wrote: "Artless and transparently simple story, but put over in a vigorous melodramatic manner with good technical qualities and quite good characterisation. To enjoy it you must not attempt to analyse its qualities too deeply."
