= Johnson Over Jordan =

1939 play by J.B. Priestley

Johnson Over Jordan is a play by J.B. Priestley.

Johnson Over Jordan focuses on Robert Johnson, a meek businessman who has recently died. Now in limbo, Johnson looks back over his life while trying to reach the Inn at the End of World. On the way, he encounters the Central Offices of Universal Assurance and Global Loan and Finance Corporation and the Jungle Hot Spot nightclub.

The play marked a departure from the naturalistic dramas that had established Priestley's reputation as a playwright, and at the time of its completion he considered it his finest and most ambitious work to date, describing it as his ‘adventure in theatre’. It reflects the author's interest in the time theories of J. W. Dunne and P. D. Ouspensky, as well as Carl Jung’s model of the unconscious.

== Production history ==
Johnson Over Jordan was originally produced in 1939, directed by Basil Dean and with Ralph Richardson in the lead role as Robert Johnson. It was accompanied by an original score from the young Benjamin Britten, with musical direction and some of the orchestrations by Ernest Irving. The play soon closed, but then transferred to the Saville Theatre for a further short run after some revisions. Paul Taylor has described it as "his most high-profile flop".

The number of productions since its 1939 debut have been limited due to the challenges of staging its dance sequences and ballet, elaborate costumes and masks (designed in 1939 by Elizabeth Haffenden), and complex stage effects and lighting.

The BBC revived the play for television in February 1965, with Ralph Richardson re-creating his original rôle. But the first professional revival in the theatre for over 50 years came in 2001 at the West Yorkshire Playhouse, where it was directed by Jude Kelly with Patrick Stewart in the title role.

== Amateur performances ==
In 1976, The joint Dramatic Society of King Edward's School, Birmingham and King Edward VI High School for Girls gave five performances of the play for the Schools' annual Senior Production. It was directed by Michael Birks. Johnson was played by Richard Horwood.

In February 2014 Bradford Grammar School was another amateur group to have performed the play, with Daniel Sanderson taking the title role of Robert Johnson. Tom Priestley, the son of J.B. Priestley, came to see the performance and commented: "Brilliant, absolutely magnificent to see such talent and my dad would have been proud." In December 2017, NLCS Jeju has also performed the play, for three days, from 5th to 7th, directed by Yeongwoo Lee, Linus Kim, Hyun Hoi Koo, Skylar Shen, Jaehong Lim, and Judy Song, and the main leads who played Johnson are Judy Song, Jeyoon Eom and Skylar Shen.
