= The Silver Fleet =

- Esmond Knight in a scene from the film
- Directed by: Vernon Sewell; Gordon Wellesley
- Written by: Vernon Sewell; Gordon Wellesley
- Produced by: Michael Powell; Emeric Pressburger
- Starring: Ralph Richardson; Googie Withers; Esmond Knight
- Cinematography: Erwin Hillier
- Edited by: Michael C. Chorlton
- Music by: Allan Gray
- Distributed by: General Film Distributors
- Release date: 15 March 1943
- Running time: 88 min.
- Country: United Kingdom
- Language: English

The Silver Fleet is a 1943 British World War II film written and directed by Vernon Sewell and Gordon Wellesley and produced by Powell and Pressburger under the banner of "The Archers".

== Plot ==
Early during the Second World War, the Nazis overrun the Netherlands and take control of a submarine shipyard where Jaap van Leyden is the chief engineer. The German Gestapo "Protector" Von Schiffer asks van Leyden to cooperate with the new regime. While pondering his decision, van Leyden walks by a grade school and overhears a teacher telling her class of pupils about Piet Hein, a hero of Dutch lore who captured the Spanish silver fleet and inspired his compatriots to continue fighting for freedom. Van Leyden then decides to accede to Von Schiffer's request. However, he undertakes a covert campaign of sabotage against the German occupation, leaving notes and graffiti signed under his nom de guerre, "Piet Hein". He also discreetly enables 12 Dutch engineers to hijack a submarine during its trial run and sail it to England, along with its captured Nazi crew.

Later, after construction of a second submarine is completed, van Leyden plants a bomb in the engine room, timed to go off the next morning. He returns home to host a dinner party, where he persuades several high-ranking Nazi officials to accompany him on the submarine's maiden (and fatal) sea trial. However, his plans almost go awry when Dutch resistance fighter Bastiaan Peters, sneaks into Van Leyden's house undetected and threatens to shoot him as a Quisling. Van Leyden convinces Peters he is "Piet Hein". Peters diverts any suspicion from van Leyden by fatally shooting himself, then handing the pistol over to van Leyden, thus protecting his "Piet Hein" identity. The next morning during its underwater trial, the second submarine is disabled when Van Leyden's bomb explodes and floods the engine room, dooming all aboard.

== Cast ==
In order of appearance, as per ending credits

- Ralph Richardson as Jaap Van Leyden
- Googie Withers as Helene Van Leyden
- Esmond Knight as von Schiffer
- Beresford Egan as Krampf
- Frederick Burtwell as Captain Muller
- Kathleen Byron as Schoolmistress
- Willem Akkerman as Willem Van Leyden
- Dorothy Gordon as Janni Peters
- Charles Victor as Bastiaan Peters
- Joss Ambler as Cornelis Smit
- Margaret Emden as Bertha
- George Schelderup as Dirk
- Neville Mapp as Joop
- Ivor Barnard as Admiral
- John Carol as Johann
- Lieut. Schouwenaar, R.N.N. as Captain of the U-boat
- Lieut. van Dapperen, R.N.N. as Lieutenant of the U-boat
- John Arold as Navigator of the U-boat
- Philip Leaver as Chief of Police
- Laurence O'Madden as Captain Schneider
- Anthony Eustrel as Lieutenant Wernicke
- Charles Minor as Bohme
- Valentine Dyall as Markgraf

== Production ==
Some scenes were filmed in the town of King's Lynn. According to Vernon Sewell, Gordon Wellesley "wanted to be a director and I said "No, co-director out! I won't have it. Only one director." So anyway, he had his name put on with me as 'written and directed by' but he wrote the script, he had nothing to do with doing direction in the movie at all."

== Reception ==
According to Vernon Sewell the film "made a fortune."
