= Passport to China =

1960 film by Michael Carreras

- Theatrical release poster
- Directed by: Michael Carreras
- Written by: Gordon Wellesley
- Produced by: Michael Carreras; Anthony Nelson-Keys
- Starring: Richard Basehart; Athene Seyler; Lisa Gastoni; Eric Pohlmann; Marne Maitland
- Cinematography: Arthur Grant; Eric Beche
- Edited by: James Needs; Alfred Cox
- Music by: Edwin Astley
- Production companies: Swallow Productions Ltd. Hammer Film Productions
- Distributed by: Columbia Pictures (UK & US)
- Release dates: 26 December 1960 (UK); February 1961 (US)
- Running time: 75 minutes
- Country: United Kingdom
- Language: English

Passport to China (released in the U.K. as Visa to Canton) is a 1960 British adventure spy film released by Columbia Pictures; directed by Michael Carreras and starring Richard Basehart, Lisa Gastoni, Eric Pohlmann and Bernard Cribbins. The screenplay, which concerns a pilot who tries to rescue a woman from China, was based on a story by Gordon Wellesley and made by Swallow Productions and Hammer Films. It was made as a pilot for a planned BBC TV series, but ended up being released as a theatrical feature instead after Hammer's earlier Tales of Frankenstein TV pilot fared so poorly in the US.

Bernard Robinson was production designer, Thomas Goswell and Don Mingaye were the art directors, Roy Ashton did makeup, and Dominic Fulford and Arthur Mann were the assistant directors. Filming went on from 9 June until 1 July 1960. It was trade shown on 20 November 1960, and released in the UK (in Technicolor) on 26 December 1960. It was theatrically released in the US only in black-and-white in February 1961. Hammer historian Tom Johnson remarked that it did not have "the feel" of a Hammer production in general.

== Plot ==
Don Benton, a former World War II combat pilot, now running a travel agency in Hong Kong, refuses to take political sides and flatly rejects an offer to do espionage work for the United States.

When Mao Tai Tai, an old Chinese woman who more or less adopted Benton during the war years, asks him to try to find her missing grandson.

Knowing that the grandson was piloting a Formosan aircraft that disappeared over mainland China, Benton obtains a passport through a Russian friend, Ivano Kang. Flying to the mainland, he rescues the downed pilot.

To clear the young man's name, Benton goes to Canton to bring back one of the aircraft passengers, an independent agent, Lola Sanchez, who has memorized a vital scientific formula and is willing to sell it to the highest bidder.

Kang tries to get the formula from Lola, but she kills him. Benton hopes to get Lola out of the city, but as they work their way through holiday street crowds, she is fatally wounded by Kang's bodyguard and dies with her secret. Back in Hong Kong, Benton once more turns down an offer to do undercover work for the CIA.

== Cast ==
- Richard Basehart as Don Benton
- Lisa Gastoni as Lola Sanchez
- Athene Seyler as Mao Tai Tai
- Eric Pohlmann as Ivano Kang
- Alan Gifford as Orme
- Bernard Cribbins as Pereira
- Burt Kwouk as Jimmy
- Marne Maitland as Han Po
- Milton Reid as Kang's bodyguard (uncredited)
- Hedgar Walllace (as Inspector Taylor)
- Yvonne Shima (as Liang Ti)
- Zoreem Ismail
- Paula Lee Shiu
- Gerry Lee Yen

== Production ==
Location scenes for Passport to China were filmed in Hong Kong. Released in Great Britain in Technicolor in December 1960 as Visa to Canton, the film was shown in the US in black-and-white as Passport to China. Although the male lead, Richard Basehart had starred in a number of prestigious feature films in the 1950s, by this point in his career, his prospects had faded. (Note: Basehart's style, characterised as sensitive and versatile, was also distant and a bit subdued," fit the reluctant hero of Passport to China.)

== Reception ==
The Monthly Film Bulletin wrote: "Hammer's incursion into the exotic East (authentic backgrounds but Athene Seyler playing a Chinese matriarch), and the territory of the spy thriller, is badly let down by an involved plot and an excess of sentimentality (the hero's attachment to a friendly Chinese family) and melodrama. Basehart and Pohlmann give respectable performances, but the picture tries too hard for an overly broad appeal."

Film reviewer Sandra Brennan, described the spy drama as one of a "reluctant hero" who becomes involved in the Cold War tensions surrounding Communist China. Ultimately, "he refuses to do any more work for American intelligence."
