= Hotel Reserve =

- Original UK cinema poster
- Directed by: Lance Comfort; Mutz Greenbaum; Victor Hanbury
- Screenplay by: John Davenport
- Based on: Epitaph for a Spy; 1938 novel by Eric Ambler
- Produced by: Lance Comfort; Mutz Greenbaum; Victor Hanbury
- Starring: James Mason; Lucie Mannheim; Raymond Lovell; Herbert Lom; Julien Mitchell
- Cinematography: Mutz Greenbaum
- Edited by: Sidney Stone
- Music by: Lennox Berkeley
- Production company: RKO Radio Pictures
- Distributed by: RKO Radio Pictures
- Release dates: 1 June 1944 (Premiere-London); 22 December 1945 (U.S.)
- Running time: 79-90 minutes
- Country: United Kingdom
- Language: English

Hotel Reserve is a 1944 British spy film starring James Mason as an innocent man caught up in pre-Second World War espionage. Other cast members include Lucie Mannheim, Raymond Lovell and Herbert Lom. It was based on Eric Ambler's 1938 novel Epitaph for a Spy. Unusually, it was both directed and produced by a trio: Lance Comfort, Mutz Greenbaum and Victor Hanbury. It was shot at Denham Studios with sets designed by the art director William C. Andrews. The film was produced and distributed by the British branch of RKO Pictures.

== Plot ==
In 1938, Austrian refugee Peter Vadassy takes a holiday at the Hotel Reserve on the French Mediterranean coast to celebrate his completion of medical school and his impending French citizenship. When he goes to collect his photographs from a pharmacy, he is detained and questioned by Michel Beghin of French naval intelligence. His negatives turn out to include shots of French military installations. It is discovered that while the camera is the same make as Peter's, the serial number is different. Peter is released on condition that he find out which other hotel guests have cameras like his.

Peter does some snooping and eavesdrops on a suspicious conversation between Paul Heimberger and the hotel's proprietor, Madame Suzanne Koch. He searches Heimberger's room and finds several passports, all with different names and nationalities. Heimberger catches him in the act, but eventually matters are straightened out. Heimberger explains that he was originally a Social Democratic newspaper publisher who was anti-Nazi and been sent to a concentration camp for two years. After he was released, he joined an underground movement against the German regime.

Peter spots his camera in the pocket of a dressing-gown belonging to Odette and Andre Roux, a couple on their honeymoon. Andre first tries to bribe Peter into giving him the negative and, when that fails, threatens him with a pistol. The police arrive at that moment and arrest Peter for espionage.

The Rouxs leave the hotel, but find Heimberger trying to disable the hotel's car. Andre shoots him dead and the couple speed off to Toulon, unaware that they are being tracked by the police. Beghin had known the identity of the spies all along and merely used Peter to further his true goal; to find out who the Rouxs are reporting to. The spy ring is captured. Andre gets away, but is caught on a roof by Peter. Andre tries to bribe him, but slips and falls to his death.

== Cast ==
- James Mason as Peter Vadassy
- Lucie Mannheim as Madame Suzanne Koch
- Raymond Lovell as Robert Duclos, a hotel guest given to exaggeration
- Julien Mitchell as Michel Beghin
- Herbert Lom as Andre Roux
- Martin Miller as Walter Vogel
- Clare Hamilton as Mary Skelton, a hotel guest who is attracted to Peter. A sister of Maureen O'Hara, her real name was Florrie Fitzsimons. This was her only film appearance.
- Frederick Valk as Emil Schimler, alias Paul Heimberger
- Patricia Medina as Odette Roux
- Anthony Shaw as Major Anthony Chandon-Hartley, a guest
- Laurence Hanray as Police Commissioner (as Lawrence Hanray)
- David Ward as Henri Asticot, a guest
- Valentine Dyall as Warren Skelton
- Joseph Almas as Albert, the waiter (as Josef Almas)
- Patricia Hayes as Servant (waitress)
- Hella Kürty as Hilda Vogel
- Ivor Barnard as P. Molon, the pharmacist
- Ernst Ulman as Detective in Black Suit

== Critical reception ==
The Radio Times noted, "this subdued thriller, set just before the Second World War, is lifted by James Mason's performance as a 'wronged man'," and concluded, "The plot has enough suspense and intrigue built in, but this movie only fitfully comes to life as Mason sets out discover who the real villain is"; Dennis Schwartz found it "a visually attractive film, though hampered because it's so slow moving"; whereas Leonard Maltin thought more highly of the piece, finding it a "Suspenseful, moody film."
