= Ivor Barnard =

English actor (1887–1953)

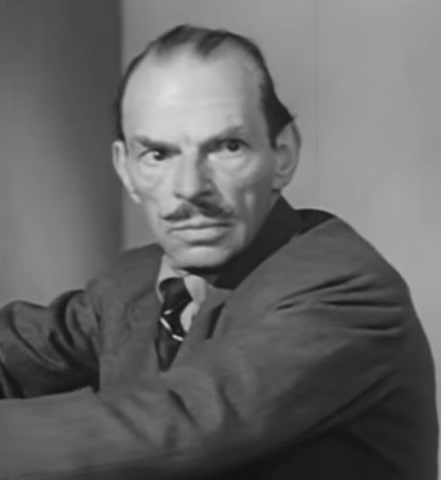
- Barnard in Beat the Devil (1953)
- Born: 13 June 1887; Marylebone, London, England
- Died: 30 June 1953 (aged 66); Westminster, London, England
- Occupation: Actor
- Years active: 1909–1953

Ivor Barnard (13 June 1887 – 30 June 1953) was an English stage, radio and film actor.

== Career ==
Barnard was an original member of the Birmingham Repertory Theatre, where he was a notable Shylock and Caliban. He played the Water Rat in the first London production of A. A. Milne's Toad of Toad Hall. In 1929 he appeared as Blanquet, in Bird in Hand at the Morosco Theatre in New York] after a successful run in London's West End (Laurence Olivier was the juvenile). The part had been specially written for him by John Drinkwater.

He appeared in more than 80 films between 1921 and 1953. He appeared in the Alfred Hitchcock film The 39 Steps in 1935. In 1943, he played the stationmaster in the Ealing war film Undercover. He also appeared as Wemmick in David Lean's Great Expectations (1946), and as the Chairman of the Workhouse, in Lean's film Oliver Twist (1948). One of his last film appearances was as the murderous Major Jack Ross in John Huston's Beat the Devil (1953) with Humphrey Bogart and Peter Lorre.

== Partial filmography ==
- The Skin Game (1921) as Dawker
- The Skin Game (1931) as Man at Auction (uncredited)
- Sally in Our Alley (1931) as Tod Small
- Illegal (1932) as Albert
- The Blind Spot (1932) as Mull
- The Good Companions (1933) as Eric Tipstead
- The Crime at Blossoms (1933) as A late visitor
- Waltz Time (1933) as Falke, the Bat
- Sleeping Car (1933) as Durande
- The Wandering Jew (1933) as Castro
- The Roof (1933) as Arthur Stannard
- Love, Life and Laughter (1934) as Troubetski
- Princess Charming (1934) as Ivanoff
- Brides to Be (1934) as John Boyle
- Death at Broadcasting House (1934) as Joseph Higgins (uncredited)
- The Price of Wisdom (1935) as Mr. Pollit
- The Village Squire (1935) as Mr. Worsford
- The 39 Steps (1935) as Political Meeting Chairman (uncredited)
- The Guv'nor (1935) as Vagrant (uncredited)
- Someday (1935) as Hope
- Foreign Affaires (1935) as Count
- The Man Behind the Mask (1936) as Hewitt
- Dreams Come True (1936) (uncredited)
- The House of the Spaniard (1936) as Mott
- The Mill on the Floss (1937) as Mr. Moss
- Secret Lives (1937) as Baldhead
- Farewell to Cinderella (1937) as Mr. Temperley
- Storm in a Teacup (1937) as Watkins
- Double Exposures (1937) as Mather
- Victoria the Great (1937) as Assassin
- Pygmalion (1938) as Sarcastic Bystander
- What a Man! (1938) as Mayor
- Everything Happens to Me (1938) as Martin
- Cheer Boys Cheer (1939) as Naseby
- The Stars Look Down (1940) as Wept
- The House of the Arrow (1940) as Jean Cladel
- Quiet Wedding (1941) as Bass (uncredited)
- The Saint's Vacation (1941) as Emil
- The Silver Fleet (1943) as Admiral
- Undercover (1943) as Station Master
- Escape to Danger (1943) as Henry Waud
- Up with the Lark (1943)
- Hotel Reserve (1944) as P. Molon, chemist [druggist]
- English Without Tears (1944) as Mr. Quiel
- Don't Take It to Heart (1944) as Bus-Driver
- Great Day (1945) as Bailiff
- Perfect Strangers (1945) as Chemist
- Murder in Reverse (1945) as Woody
- The Wicked Lady (1945) as Clergyman
- Caesar and Cleopatra (1945) as 2nd. Nobleman
- What Do We Do Now? (1946) as Ted Goof
- Appointment with Crime (1946) as Jonah Crackle
- Great Expectations (1946) as Mr. Wemmick
- The Grand Escapade (1947) as Fisherman
- So Well Remembered (1947) as Spivey
- Mrs Fitzherbert (1947) as Rev. Burt
- So Evil My Love (1948) as Mr. Watson
- Oliver Twist (1948) as Chairman of the Board
- London Belongs to Me (1948) as Mr. Justice Plymme
- Esther Waters (1948) as Randal
- The Queen of Spades (1949) as Bookseller
- Paper Orchid (1949) as Eustace Crabb
- Madeleine (1950) as Mr. Murdoch
- Hell Is Sold Out (1951) as Taxi Driver (uncredited)
- The Importance of Being Earnest (1952) as Guard on train (uncredited)
- Time Gentlemen, Please! (1952) as Timothy Crouch
- Hot Ice (1952) as Edwin Carson
- Sea Devils (1953) as Benson
- Malta Story (1953) as Old Man (uncredited)
- Beat the Devil (1953) as Major Jack Ross

== Radio ==
- The Dark Tower (1946)
