= Guy des Cars =

French novelist (1911–1993)

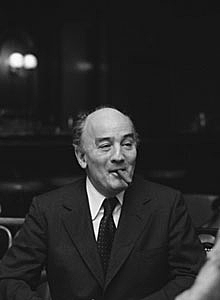
- 1977
- Born: Guy Augustin Marie Jean de la Pérusse des Cars; 6 May 1911; Paris, France
- Died: 21 December 1993 (aged 82); Paris, France
- Occupation: Writer
- Spouse: Marthe Claquin (after 1947)
- Writing career
- Genre: Popular novels

Guy Augustin Marie Jean de la Pérusse des Cars (6 May 1911 – 21 December 1993) was a best-selling French author of popular novels.

== Personal life ==
Born in Paris on 6 May 1911, des Cars was from an aristocratic family. He was the second son of François de la Péruse, Duke of Cars (1875–1941) and Marie Thérésa Edwards (1879–1941). Cars' father was a young military attache in London when at a Victorian debutante ball he met his future wife, the daughter of Agustín Edwards Ross President of the Senate of Chile. Cars would later be inspired by his mother in his work.

He went to school at Jesuits at Evroux. After school, his mother paid for him to become a priest. At 19, he visited his mother's family in Chile. On board ship on his way back to France, he wrote a bright little comedy, Croisiere pour dames seules ('Cruise for Unattached Ladies') which ran for a hundred performances, much to the horror of his family. They cut off his allowance, and des Cars began his career in journalism.

It's possible he married more than once. On 12 May 1947, he married the lyric artist, Marthe Claquin.

He is the father of Jean des Cars, French journalist.

== Career ==
des Cars started his writing career before World War II as a journalist, and wrote many different kinds of articles, from fashion to foreign policy. He showed a keen interest in the circus and variety arts, which led him to become a street entertainer, eventually touring with the Cirque Pinder, with which he travelled all over Europe. Life in the circus was to provide the background for his second novel, La Dame du Cirque (1943). In the 1930s, he worked as Press Agent for the giant German Circus Gleich.

des Cars served in World War II and returned with the Croix de Guerre, and the manuscript of his first novel. After that, he published 60 popular novels, including many best-sellers with salacious covers, within the trend of pulp fiction in America. He was condemned by the intelligentsia as a 'railway bookstall novelist' – earning him the nickname of 'Guy des Gares'. He didn't care: 'Being a popular novelist is no problem for me – but being an unpopular one would be.'

He was translated into 21 languages and his work covered many taboo topics. In 1954, he released La Maudite, to be reprinted in America as The Damned One. This particular novel detailed a lesbian relationship, situating it into the canon of lesbian pulp fiction. It received a Grier Rating of A*, and was rated 'objectionable' by the National Organization for Decent Literature.

== Literary works ==
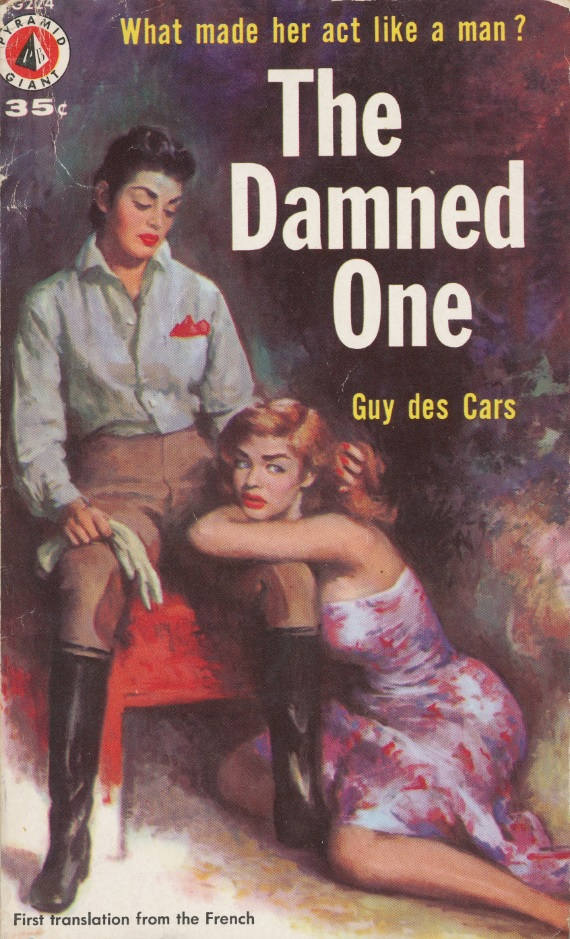
Cover of The Damned One, 1956

- 1946 – L'impure (1946)
- 1947 – Les sept femmes (Seven Women)
- 1948 – La demoiselle d'opéra
- 1951 – La brute (a TV show was based on this novel; as well as the 1954 British film The Green Scarf)
- 1953 – L'amour s'en va en guerre
- 1954 – La maudite (The Damned One)
- 1955 – L'officier sans nom
- 1956 – Amour de ma vie
- 1956 – La cathédrale de haine
- 1957 – La tricheuse (a TV show was based on this novel)
- 1958 – Le château de la juive
- 1959 – Les filles de joie
- 1960 – Cette étrange tendresse
- 1961 – Le grand Monde
- 1962 – La dame du cirque
- 1963 – Sang d'Afrique
- 1964 – Les sept femmes
- 1965 – De cape et de plume
- 1966 – L'habitude d'amour
- 1967 – Le faussaire
- 1968 – La révoltée
- 1969 – La vipère
- 1970 – L'entremetteuse
- 1971 – Une certaine dame
- 1972 – L'insolence de sa beauté
- 1973 – La vie secrète de Dorothée Gindt
- 1973 – Le donneur
- 1974 – J'ose, récit autobiographique
- 1975 – L'envouteuse
- 1974 – Le mage et la boule de cristal
- 1976 – Le mage et les lignes de la main
- 1977 – Le chateau du clown
- 1977 – Le mage et la bonne aventure
- 1978 – Le mage et la graphologie
- 1979 – La femme qui en savait trop
- 1979 – Les Reines de cœur de Roumanie
- 1981 – La femme sans frontière
- 1983 – Le crime de Mathilde
- 1984 – Le faiseur de morts
- 1984 – La voleuse
- 1985 – Je t'aimerai éternellement
- 1990 – La femme d'argent

Others books published with unknown dates:

- La coupable – Guilty
- La femme objet
- La justicière
- La mère porteuse
- La vengeresse
- La visiteuse
- Le boulevard des illusions – Illusions boulevard
- Le mage et le pendule – This book is part of a serie – after Le mage et la boule de cristal, written in 1974 et before Mage et les lignes de la main, written in 1976.
- Le train du Père Noël – Santa Claus' Train
- L'homme au double visage – Double face Man – (a TV show was based on this novel)
