= Loyalties (1933 film) =

1933 film by Basil Dean

- Miles Mander confronts Basil Rathbone
- Directed by: Basil Dean
- Written by: John Galsworthy (play); W. P. Lipscomb
- Produced by: Basil Dean
- Starring: Basil Rathbone; Heather Thatcher; Miles Mander
- Cinematography: Robert Martin
- Edited by: Thorold Dickinson
- Production company: Associated Talking Pictures
- Distributed by: ABFD (UK); Harold Auten (US)
- Release date: 3 July 1933
- Running time: 74 minutes
- Country: United Kingdom
- Language: English

Loyalties is a 1933 British drama film directed by Basil Dean and starring Basil Rathbone, Heather Thatcher and Miles Mander. It is based on the 1922 John Galsworthy play Loyalties.

The film addresses the theme of antisemitism. The film was part of an increased trend depicting mistreatment of Jews in British films during the 1930s, tied to the rising tide of anti-Semitism in Nazi Germany, but is unusual in its depiction of prejudice in Britain as most other films were set in a non-British, historical context.

== Plot ==
While a houseguest at an upper-class gathering, the wealthy Jew Ferdinand de Levis is robbed of nearly £1,000 with evidence pointing towards the guilt of another guest, Captain Dancy. Instead of supporting De Levis, the host attempts to hush the matter up and then sides with Dancy and subtly tries to destroy de Levis's reputation. When Dancy is later exposed and commits suicide, de Levis is blamed for his demise.

== Cast ==
- Basil Rathbone as Ferdinand de Levis
- Heather Thatcher as Margaret Orme
- Miles Mander as Captain Ronald Dancy, DSO
- Joan Wyndham as Mabel, Mrs. Borring
- Philip Strange as Major Colford
- Alan Napier as General Canynge
- Cecily Byrne as Lady Adela
- Athole Stewart as Lord St. Erth
- Patric Curwen as Sir Fredric Blair
- Marcus Barron as The Lord Chief Justice
- Ben Field as Gilman
- Griffith Humphreys as Inspector Jones
- Robert Coote as Robert
- Aubrey Dexter as Kentman
- Laurence Hanray as Jacob Twisden
- Stafford Hilliard as Treisure
- Anthony Holles as Ricardos
- Mike Johnson as Jenkins
- Arnold Lucy as Googie
- Don MacKay as Mike Sawchuck
- Robert Mawdesley as Edward Graviter
- Maxine Sandra as Ricardo's Daughter
- Patrick Waddington as Augustus Borring
- Algernon West as Charles Winsor

== Production ==
Film rights were purchased by Herbert Wilcox for £9,000. He developed a screenplay for an extra £2,000. Galsworthy had contractual rights of approval over the project. Wilcox sold the project to William Fox for £20,000.

The film was the first to be made by Associated Talking Pictures (which later became Ealing Studios), after the breakdown of their arrangement with RKO Pictures. Carol Reed and Thorold Dickinson both worked on the film's production as assistant directors. Edward Carrick designed the film's sets.

== Bibliography ==
- Low, Rachel. History of British Film: Volume VII, 1929-1939. Routledge, 1997
- Robertson, James C. The British Board of Film Censors: film censorship in Britain, 1896-1950. Croom Helm, 1985.
