= The Water Gipsies (film) =

1932 film

- Richard Bird and Ann Todd in the film
- Directed by: Maurice Elvey
- Written by: A.P. Herbert (novel); Miles Malleson; Alma Reville; John Paddy Carstairs; Basil Dean
- Produced by: Basil Dean
- Starring: Ann Todd; Sari Maritza; Ian Hunter
- Cinematography: Robert De Grasse; Robert Martin
- Edited by: Otto Ludwig
- Music by: Vivian Ellis; Ernest Irving
- Production company: Associated Talking Pictures
- Distributed by: RKO Pictures
- Release date: 7 November 1932
- Running time: 80 minutes
- Country: United Kingdom
- Language: English

The Water Gipsies (also known as The Water Gypsies) is a 1932 British low-budget drama film directed by Maurice Elvey and starring Ann Todd, Sari Maritza and Ian Hunter. It was written by Miles Malleson, Alma Reville, John Paddy Carstairs and Basil Dean, adaptated from the 1930 novel The Water Gipsies by A.P. Herbert. The film was made at Beaconsfield Studios as a "quota quickie".

Vivian Ellis worked as the film's composer, and later used some of the music in the 1955 stage musical adaptation of the novel.

The film also features a 22 year old Raymond Raikes in the role of sozzled Bertie Peach at the party. Raikes went on to become England's most celebrated director and producer of classical radio drama and the first to broadcast drama in stereo.

== Plot ==
Jane and Lily Bell live on a barge moored at Hammersmith. While the sophisticated Lily focuses on chasing a glamorous lifestyle, her sister Jane is pursued by two suitors: a clumsy, tongue-tied bargee named Fred, and Ernest Higgins, a socialist London underground guard. Jane, however, is infatuated with Mr. Bryan, an artist whose studio she cleans.

Hoping to win her over, Fred takes Jane on a canal trip and proposes, but she runs away. She eventually agrees to marry Ernest, but their engagement abruptly ends when he becomes jealous of Bryan, who is painting Jane as a semi-nude. In a fit of rage, Ernest bursts into the studio and rips the canvas to shreds. During the chaotic confrontation that follows, he falls into the canal and drowns.

Jane throws herself at Bryan, oblivious to the fact that he intends to marry a high-society woman, Fay Meadows. Though Bryan is fond of Jane, he does not love her. He takes her to one of Fay's lavish parties and books a hotel room for her stay afterwards. Overwhelmed by misery, Jane leaves the party early and waits at the hotel for Bryan, who has no intention of being indiscreet. Realising that her obsession is hopeless, Jane returns to the faithful Fred and a quiet life on the canal.

== Cast ==
- Ann Todd as Jane Bell
- Sari Maritza as Lily Bell
- Ian Hunter as Fred Green
- Peter Hannen as Bryan
- Richard Bird as Ernest
- Frances Doble as Fay
- Anthony Ireland as Moss
- Barbara Gott as Mrs Green
- Moore Marriott as Mr Pewtar
- Raymond Raikes as Bertie Peach
- Harold Scott as Mr Bell
- Charles Garry as Mr Green
- Betty Shale as Mrs Higgins

== Reception ==
Film Weekly wrote: "Let it be admitted that A.P. Herbert's somewhat inconsequential story of two 'sex-conscious' bargee girls was problematical screen material at the start. Its transference to the screen, even under the direction of Maurice Elvey, has resulted in a misfire which is mid-way between the psychological and the dramatic. The production is formless, presenting a detached series of scenes in which continuity seems to have come in a poor second."

The Daily Film Renter wrote: "Episodic in treatment and lacking comprehensive story. Does not give characters a chance to be more than puppets. Redundant footage after drowning of ostensible 'villain' makes for anticlimax. Canal exteriors are very beautiful, but whole picture lacks entertainment. Those who know the book are likely to be disappointed at its talkie form."
