= Atlantic Ferry =

1941 British film by Walter Forde

- Theatrical release poster
- Directed by: Walter Forde
- Written by: Gordon Wellesley; Edward Dryhurst; Emeric Pressburger
- Based on: story by Derek MacIver; Wynne MacIver
- Produced by: Max Milder (uncredited); Culley Forde (associate producer)
- Starring: Michael Redgrave; Valerie Hobson; Griffith Jones
- Cinematography: Basil Emmott
- Edited by: Terence Fisher
- Music by: Jack Beaver
- Production company: Warner Bros. Pictures
- Distributed by: Warner Bros. Pictures
- Release dates: 6 September 1941 (UK); 7 February 1942 (U.S.)
- Countries: United Kingdom; United States
- Language: English
- Budget: £97,355
- Box office: £88,558

Atlantic Ferry (U.S. title: Sons of the Sea) is a 1941 British film directed by Walter Forde and starring Michael Redgrave and Valerie Hobson. It was written by Gordon Wellesley, Edward Dryhurst and Emeric Pressburger based on a story by Derek MacIver and Wynne MacIver, and was made at Teddington Studios.

== Plot ==
In 1837 Liverpool, brothers Charles and David MacIver have great faith in steam-powered ships. Their first attempt, the coastal freighter Gigantic, proves to be an embarrassing and costly failure, sinking immediately after being launched. David becomes discouraged and, to save their failing shipping firm, agrees to a merger proposed by longtime rival George Burns.

Charles, however, is undaunted, despite being turned down by every banker when he seeks new funding. He gives his share of the family firm to David and sets out on his own. He teams up with Nova Scotian Samuel Cunard and engineer Robert Napier, and they build the RMS Britannia. They win a British mail contract and make the first steamship crossing of the Atlantic, from Liverpool to Boston, in record time, despite a storm that threatens to sink the ship.

Romantic complications ensue when both brothers fall in love with Mary Ann Morison, the daughter of an important government shipping official. She agrees to marry David (before she becomes acquainted with his brother), but it is Charles who wins her heart.

== Cast ==
- Michael Redgrave as Charles MacIver
- Valerie Hobson as Mary Ann Morison
- Griffith Jones as David MacIver
- Hartley Power as Samuel Cunard
- Margaretta Scott as Susan Donaldson
- Bessie Love as Begonia Baggot
- Milton Rosmer as George Burns
- Frederick Leister as James Morison
- Henry Oscar as Josiah Eagles
- Edmund Willard as Robert Napier
- Charles Victor as Tim Grogan
- Frank Tickle as Mr Donaldson
- Leslie Bradley as Horatio Stubbs
- Felix Aylmer as bank president
- Joss Ambler as Dr Lardner

== Reception ==
=== Box office ===
According to Warner Bros. records, it earned $87,000 domestically and $16,000 foreign.

=== Critical ===
The Monthly Film Bulletin wrote: "This is a splendid production in which all concerned deserve the highest praise. Valerie Hobson is excellent as Mary Morison and the brothers are played by Michael Redgrave as Charles and Griffith Jones as David. The photographers and technicians have managed to produce some moving sea sequences and the acting from star to super is really first-class. The film is good propaganda, especially at the moment, and should be seen with enthusiasm both here and in America."

Kine Weekly wrote: "The architecture of the period story is, at times, a little cumbersome, but its colorful authenticity and vividly realistic and thrilling sea spectacle subsequently conquer its initial lack of showmanship. ... Authentic, inspiring and actionful story, accurate and impressive characterisation, appealing and spirited romantic angle."

Picture Show wrote: "Spectacular drama of the establishment of the first regular steamship service between England and America. ... As Charles and Mary Ann, Michael Redgrave and Valerie Hobson give delightful portrayals, with Griffith Jones excellent as David."

Variety wrote: "Sketchiness in dramatic outline holds it short of solid appeal. Acknowledged confines of British production have been minimized in effect by the lavish treatment Max Milder has accorded his picture, dressiness nearly lifting it to epic standards. But in view of the spectacular background of a yarn concerning the heartbreak and chiseling which preceded the coming of steam to the Atlantic, its unfortunate screenplay should not have centered heavily on a weak, patchy romantic structure wherein too many scribes seem to have had a hand. Walter Forde's direction aces in the spectacular stuff of shipwreck, storm and free-for-all; is unable to shake off lethargy of the script once away from these."
