= Robert Martin (cinematographer) =

American cinematographer

- Born: Robert Gordon Martin; 7 December 1891; Indiana, United States
- Died: 24 March 1980 (aged 88); Los Angeles, California, United States
- Occupation: cinematographer
- Years active: 1920–1937

Robert Martin (7 December 1891 – 24 March 1980) (sometimes credited as Robert G. Martin or Bob Martin) was an American cinematographer.

== Filmography ==
- 1920: Smiling All the Way
- 1920: Girls Don't Gamble (as Bob Martin)
- 1921: Making the Grade
- 1921: My Boy
- 1922: Trouble
- 1922: Oliver Twist
- 1923: Daddy
- 1923: Circus Days
- 1924: A Boy of Flanders
- 1924: Little Robinson Crusoe
- 1925: The Rag Man
- 1926: Siberia
- 1927: The Princess from Hoboken
- 1927: The Love of Sunya
- 1928: Coney Island
- 1928: Crooks Can't Win
- 1928: Black Feather
- 1928: Hit of the Show
- 1928: Danger Street
- 1928: Blockade
- 1928: Hey Rube!
- 1929: The Voice of the Storm
- 1929: Harboiled
- 1930: Should a Doctor Tell?
- 1931: Sally in Our Alley
- 1931: A Honeymoon Adventure
- 1932: Nine Till Six
- 1932: Looking on the Bright Side
- 1932: The Water Gipsies
- 1932: The Sign of Four: Sherlock Holmes' Greatest Case (as Robert G. Martin)
- 1932: The Impassive Footman
- 1932: That Night in London
- 1933: Three Men in a Boat
- 1933: Strange Evidence
- 1933: Cash
- 1933: Loyalties
- 1933: The House of Trent
- 1934: Autumn Crocus
- 1934: Java Head
- 1934: The Tiger Bay
- 1934: Sing As We Go
- 1934: Love, Life and Laughter
- 1934: Lorna Doone
- 1935: Look Up and Laugh
- 1935: It Happened in Paris (as Robert G. Martin)
- 1935: No Limit
- 1936: Shipmates
- 1936: Debt of Honour
- 1937: The Great Barrier
