= Nine till Six =

1932 film

- Isla Bevin and Elizabeth Allan in the film
- Directed by: Basil Dean
- Written by: Aimée Stuart (play); Philip Stuart (play); John Paddy Carstairs; Beverley Nichols; Alma Reville
- Produced by: Basil Dean
- Starring: Louise Hampton; Elizabeth Allan; Florence Desmond; Isla Bevan
- Cinematography: Robert De Grasse; Robert Martin
- Edited by: Otto Ludwig
- Music by: Ernest Irving
- Production company: Associated Talking Pictures
- Distributed by: RKO Pictures
- Release date: March 1932
- Running time: 75 minutes
- Country: United Kingdom
- Language: English

Nine till Six is a 1932 British drama film directed by Basil Dean and starring Louise Hampton, Elizabeth Allan and Florence Desmond. It was written by John Paddy Carstairs, Beverley Nichols and Alma Reville based on the 1930 play of the same title by Aimée Stuart and Philip Stuart. Produced by Basil Dean's Associated Talking Pictures as a quota quickie, it was the first film made at Ealing Studios after the facility had been converted to sound.

== Plot ==
Two women of different social backgrounds work together in a dressmaker's.

== Cast ==
- Louise Hampton as Madam
- Elizabeth Allan as Gracie Abbott
- Florence Desmond as Daisy
- Isla Bevan as Ailene Pannarth
- Richard Bird as Jimmie Pennarth
- Frances Doble as Clare
- Jeanne de Casalis as Yvonne
- Kay Hammond as Beatrice
- Sunday Wilshin as Judy
- Alison Leggatt as Freda
- Moore Marriott as doorman

== Reception ==
Film Weekly wrote: "Although the screen version ol Nine Till Six is not just a photographed stage play, it is obvious that its material belongs to the stage rather than the screen. Owing to the nature of the story, the variety of characters can only explain themselves by a lot of talk that militates against action. Settings are quite lavish, and there is an elaborate mannequin parade, but leisurely, ineffective direction does not take advantage of these semi-spectactilar adjuncts. Because it fails to get to grips with its theme, and skims on the surface of emotion, it can only be described as fair entertainment."

Kine Weekly wrote: "Excellently produced film version of well-known stage play, with comedy and pathos evenly balanced, and building up to a remarkably fine close which will keep any audience alive with sympathy. A real woman's picture which does not allow sentiment to degenerate into sob stuff."

The Daily Film Renter wrote: "Artistic settings, but the paucity of the story robs it of entertainment value. Good performance of Louise Hampton, mannequin parades and several glimpses of ladies in state of attractive undress, familiar to type of production. May prove acceptable to average audiences."
