= Otto Ludwig (film editor) =

American film editor (1903–1983)

- Born: March 9, 1903; Orchard, California, United States
- Died: January 14, 1983; Los Angeles County, California, United States
- Occupation: Film editor

Otto Ludwig (March 9, 1903, in Orchard, California – January 14, 1983, in Los Angeles County, California) was a film editor who worked on American and British films.

== Partial filmography ==
- Midnight Mystery (1930)
- Shooting Straight (1930)
- Sally in Our Alley (1931)
- The Drums of Jeopardy (1931)
- A Honeymoon Adventure (1931)
- The Water Gipsies (1932)
- Nine till Six (1932)
- The Impassive Footman (1932)
- The Sign of Four (1932)
- Looking on the Bright Side (1932)
- Brown on Resolution (1935)
- You Can't Cheat an Honest Man (1939)
- Beyond Tomorrow (1940)
- Timber (1942)
- Saboteur (1942)
- Cuban Pete (1946)
- Idea Girl (1946)
- Inside Job (1946)
- Something in the Wind (1947)
- River Lady (1948)
- Red Canyon (1949)
- Sword in the Desert (1949)
- The Desert Hawk (1950)
- The Groom Wore Spurs (1951)
- Rancho Notorious (1952)
- The Steel Trap (1952)
- The Moon is Blue (1953, for which he was nominated for the 1953 Academy Award for Film Editing)
- Hot Blood (1956)
- Solomon and Sheba (1959)
