= Edward Carrick =

English art designer and author (1905–1998)

- Born: Edward Anthony Craig; 3 January 1905; Bristol, England
- Died: 21 January 1998 (aged 93); London, England

Edward Carrick (born Edward Anthony Craig; 3 January 1905 – 21 January 1998) was an English art designer for film, an author and illustrator.

== Biography ==
Carrick was born in London. His father was Edward Gordon Craig, the theatre practitioner and stage designer, and his mother was the violinist Elena Fortuna Meo (1879–1957), one of his father's several lovers with whom he had children. Carrick's paternal grandmother was the actress Ellen Terry, and his maternal grandfather was the model and painter Gaetano Meo. He was close with both of these famous grandparents.

Carrick changed his last name from Craig to disassociate himself from his tyrannical and controlling father, with whom he disagreed over his career path, and who forbade his engagement to his future wife, Helen Godfrey, in 1928. Nevertheless, Carrick learned his artistic and design skills working for his father. He became the art director of several film companies, beginning in 1928, including Associated Talking Pictures and Criterion Film in the 1930s, the Crown Film Unit during the Second World War, and later Pinewood Studios. He also created stage designs. His daughter, with Godfrey, is the author Helen Craig, and they also had a son, the artist and illustrator John Craig. After Godfrey died in 1960, he married Mary Timewell.

In London in 1937, Carrick opened the first school for the study of film design. He also began to illustrate books, for Edward James among others, and he also produced work as a fine artist, including paintings, drawings and prints. He helped to found the Grubb Group, to aid struggling artists. While working with the Crown Film unit, he published the book, Designing for Moving Pictures (1941), which became a seminal work for students on film design and is still used today. He next published Meet the Common People (1942), a commentary on the effect of war on everyday life. Art and Design in British Films followed in 1948. He wrote a biography of his father in 1968, Gordon Craig: the story of his life, which includes some history of his famous family and became a best seller.

== Selected filmography ==
- The Broken Melody (1929)
- Loyalties (1933)
- Autumn Crocus (1934)
- Java Head (1934)
- Sing As We Go (1934)
- Lorna Doone (1934)
- Midshipman Easy (1935)
- Laburnum Grove (1936)
- Crime Over London (1936)
- The Amateur Gentleman (1936)
- Accused (1936)
- O.H.M.S. (1937)
- Jericho (1937)
- Jump for Glory (1937)
- Target for Tonight (1941)
- Coastal Command (1942)
- Western Approaches (1944)
- The Spider and the Fly (1949)
- The Blue Lagoon (1949)
- So Little Time (1952)
- The Gift Horse (1952)
- It Started in Paradise (1952)
- The Kidnappers (US: The Little Kidnappers, 1953)
- The One That Got Away (1957)
- The Battle of the Sexes (1959)
- The Nanny (1965)

== Bibliography ==
- 1948 - Designing for Films
