= Java Head (1934 film) =

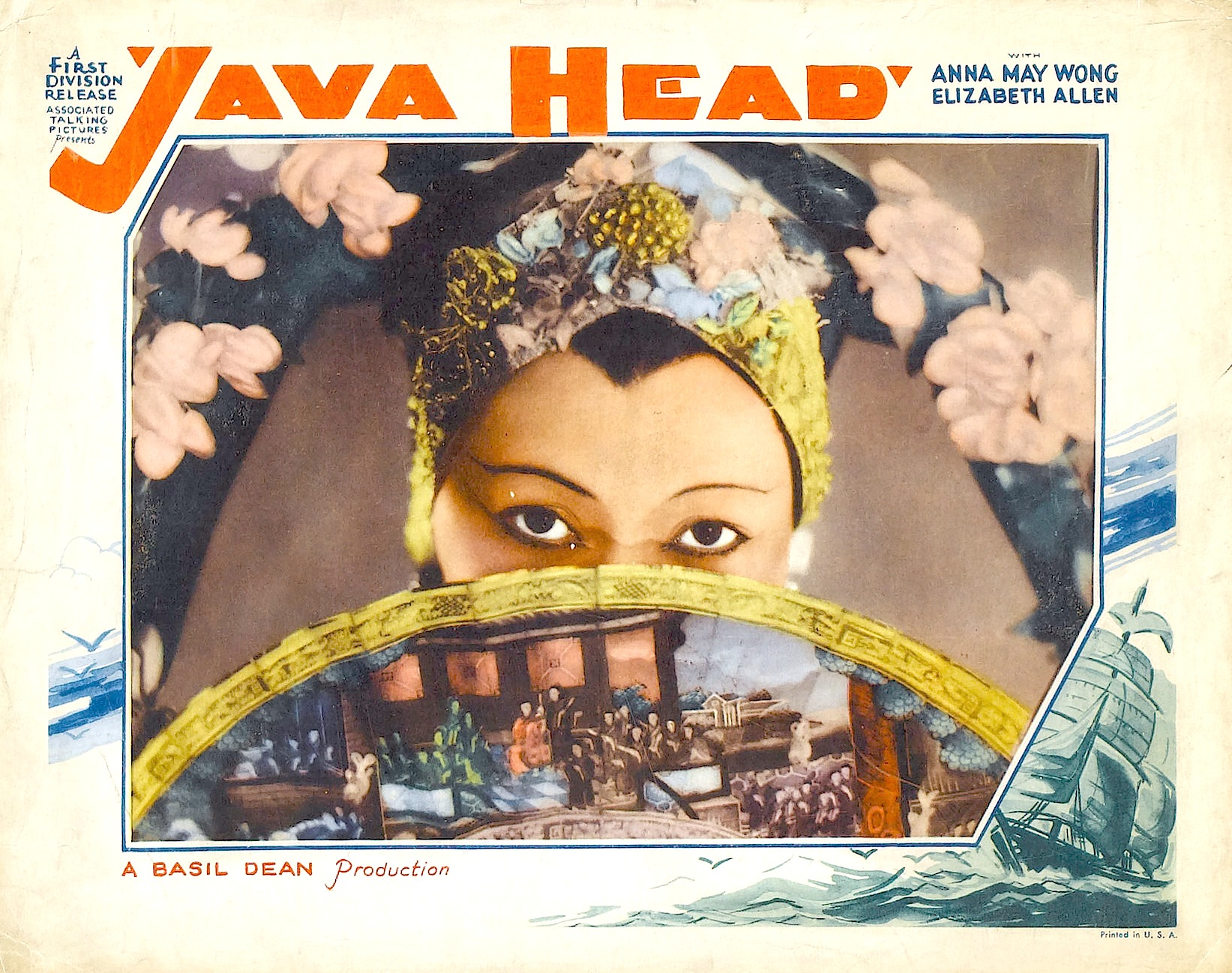
- Film Poster
- Directed by: J. Walter Ruben; Thorold Dickinson (uncredited); Carol Reed (assistant director)
- Written by: Gordon Wellesley; Martin Brown
- Based on: Java Head by Joseph Hergesheimer
- Produced by: Basil Dean
- Starring: Anna May Wong; Elizabeth Allan; Ralph Richardson; John Loder
- Cinematography: Robert Martin
- Edited by: Thorold Dickinson; David Lean (uncredited)
- Music by: Ernest Irving
- Production company: Associated Talking Pictures
- Distributed by: ABFD
- Release date: August 1934
- Running time: 85 minutes
- Country: United Kingdom
- Language: English

Java Head is a 1934 British historical drama film directed by J. Walter Ruben and an uncredited Thorold Dickinson. It stars Anna May Wong, Elizabeth Allan and Ralph Richardson.

== Plot ==
The film is set mostly in the seaport of Bristol, England, in the years 1848–50. Captain Jeremy Ammidon is the founder of the shipping line Ammidon & Sons, and lives with his family in his house "Java Head", named after the promontory in Java, Indonesia. (Note: The Java Head promontory is now known as Tanjung Layar) His elder, land-based son William runs the company day-to-day, and wants to upgrade the fleet from slow sailing ships to fast clippers and steamships, and to carry contraband, all against his father’s wishes. Captain Ammidon’s younger, seafaring, son Gerrit is friends with Nettie Vollar. Nettie secretly loves Gerrit but her strict and religious grandfather, who has had a 20-year quarrel with his old shipmate Captain Ammidon, disapproves of any deeper friendship between Nettie and Gerrit.

Gerrit leaves on a commercial voyage and spends a year sailing round the world, taking weeks longer than other ships. He returns with a new bride, the beautiful Taou Yuen, who is the daughter of a Manchu prince. (Note: In reviews, Taou Yuen is often referred to as “Princess Taou Yuen”. However, in the film, she is described as the daughter of a Manchu prince, and the only person who calls her a princess is Edward Dunsack, who is not reliable.) The Ammidon family are shocked and the conservative local townspeople are scandalised, exchanging gossip about Gerrit returning with “a heathen Chinese! From China!” Churchgoers look on aghast when she attends Sunday service in traditional Chinese dress, although the vicar is more welcoming and explains he has studied the teachings of Confucius. Although the Ammidons are initially as hostile as their friends and neighbours, the women in the family warm to Taou Yuen’s grace and nobility. Taou Yuen fears she is pursued by an evil spirit. She also tells Gerrit that “Unless I make you happy, I have no right to live.”

Time passes, and Gerrit wants to return to sea. He shows signs of dissatisfaction with his marriage to his exotic wife, and is concerned about leaving her alone while he is away. He starts to pay attention to Nettie, feeling sorry for her and her family’s deteriorating business position.

Without consulting Captain Ammidon or Gerrit, William orders four clipper ships and two steam packets. Captain Ammidon is initially interested in the details, but he then discovers that William has also been using the family’s ships to transport opium. Captain Ammidon is appalled and dies from shock. Gerrit decides he no longer wants to be part of the firm but to sell up and take one ship to start a new business in the Far East. He is also annoyed by Taou Yuen’s mourning ceremonies and her attitude towards death, which he does not understand.

Gerrit and Nettie declare their love for each other, but Gerrit says he must leave her as he already has a wife. Taou Yuen realises that her husband loves another woman, and that there cannot be two loves in his life. She visits Nettie and, as she is about to garrotte her to death, she is interrupted. Taou Yuen poisons herself with opium and dies.

Gerrit sails away with Nettie to their new life together.

== Cast ==
- Anna May Wong as Taou Yuen
- Elizabeth Allan as Nettie Vollar
- John Loder as Gerrit Ammidon
- Edmund Gwenn as Jeremy Ammidon
- Ralph Richardson as William Ammidon
- Herbert Lomas as Barzil Dunsack
- George Curzon as Edward Dunsack
- John Marriner as John Stone
- Grey Blake as Roger Brevard
- Roy Emerton as Broadrick
- Amy Brandon Thomas as Rhoda Ammidon
- Frances Carson as Kate Vollar

== Themes ==
The film is riddled with mixed messages. Most of the film seems to be a revisionist historical drama attacking bourgeois and religious hypocrisy and, especially, racism. The story also shows the clash between traditional values (Jeremy) and modern greed (William).

However, the behaviour of Nettie’s uncle Edward (who lusts after Taou Yuen) implies that Chinese culture is a kind of drug, similar to opium, which inflames the senses and stirs unnatural desires. The film, far from encouraging better understanding between East and West, seems to believe some things should stay separate.

== Production ==
The screenplay was written by Gordon Wellesley and Carol Reed served as an assistant director. The film is an adaptation of a novel by Joseph Hergesheimer of the same name. Its sets were designed by Edward Carrick. Thorold Dickinson gained his first directorial experience when he took over after J. Walter Ruben became ill and was unable to continue.

A previous silent version was directed in 1923 by George Melford for Paramount Pictures. It starred Leatrice Joy. The silent version is considered a lost film.

== Reception ==
The review aggregator Rotten Tomatoes reports that 80% of critics gave the film a positive review based on 5 reviews.
