= Autumn Crocus (film) =

1934 British film by Basil Dean

- Ivor Novello and Fay Compton
- Directed by: Basil Dean
- Written by: Dorothy Farnum; Basil Dean
- Based on: Autumn Crocus by Dodie Smith
- Produced by: Basil Dean
- Starring: Ivor Novello; Fay Compton; Muriel Aked; Esme Church
- Cinematography: Robert Martin
- Edited by: Walter S. Stern
- Music by: Ernest Irving
- Production company: Associated Talking Pictures
- Distributed by: Associated British
- Release date: February 1934
- Running time: 86 minutes
- Country: United Kingdom
- Language: English

Autumn Crocus is a 1934 British romance film directed by Basil Dean and starring Ivor Novello, Fay Compton and Muriel Aked. The film follows a teacher who falls in love with the married owner of the guest house in which she is staying during a holiday to Austria. It was based on Dodie Smith's first play Autumn Crocus, previously a West End hit for director Basil Dean. The film was made by Associated Talking Pictures at Ealing Studios, with art direction by Edward Carrick. It was the final film appearance of its star, Ivor Novello. A contemporary reviewer wrote, "Novello's schoolboy knees under his Tyrolean shorts make the audience, if not the players, feel bashful".

== Cast ==
- Ivor Novello as Andreas Steiner
- Fay Compton as Jenny Grey
- Muriel Aked as Miss Mayne
- Esme Church as Edith
- Frederick Ranalow as Herr Feldmann
- Jack Hawkins as Alaric
- Diana Beaumont as Audrey
- Mignon O'Doherty as Frau Feldmann
- George Zucco as Reverend Mayne
- Gertrude Gould as Frau Steiner
- Alyce Sandor as Minna
- Pamela Blake as Lenchen

== Reception ==
The New York Times reviewer wrote, "the wistful romance of the fading English schoolmistress and the cheerful Tyrolean inn-keeper drags in its telling, and this in the face of the presence of Fay Compton and Ivor Novello in the principal rôles and of Basil Dean's direction". The critic felt that Compton overacted, surprising since she played the role on stage for more than sixty weeks, in contrast to "the performances of Mr. Novello, Muriel Aked and Esme Church, who did well, indeed." Still, the reviewer felt that Autumn Crocus "has a delicate charm, is handsomely photographed and presents a refreshingly different solution to a problem that would have had Hollywood's script-writers dashing madly in all directions."

== Bibliography ==
- Low, Rachael. Filmmaking in 1930s Britain. George Allen & Unwin, 1985.
- Perry, George. Forever Ealing. Pavilion Books, 1994.
