= Ernest Irving =

British composer and conductor

Kelville Ernest Irving (6 November 1878 – 24 October 1953) was an English music director, conductor and composer, primarily remembered as a theatre musician in London between the wars, and for his key contributions to British film music as music director at Ealing Studios from the 1930s to the 1950s.

== Early life ==
Irving was born in Godalming, Surrey, and from the age of seven sang in the choir at Godalming Parish Church. He attended Charterhouse School. Other than that he was self-taught, and began his career applying for music director jobs advertised in The Stage. His first professional job conducting an orchestra was for the musical burlesque Villiano the Vicious at the Theatre Royal, Maidenhead in 1895. He then spent the next two decades learning his trade by touring with productions (of variable quality) all around the UK - in his own words conducting "third rate opera and second-rate musical comedy". The tours included some organised by the theatre manager George Edwardes. In 1907 he worked with Edward German to reduce the orchestral scoring for the opera Tom Jones down to 15 players for touring purposes. German liked his work, and asked him to do the same again the following year for Merrie England.

His big break came in 1917 when he met Norman O'Neill at the Savage Club. At the time O'Neill was music director of the Haymarket Theatre and treasurer of the Royal Philharmonic Society. Irving became involved with both, deputising for O'Neill and conducting on tours of his productions, including the popular Mary Rose in 1920. He was a great admirer of O'Neill's work, and once compared a performance of Mary Rose without his music to "a dance by a fairy with a wooden leg."

== London theatre ==
From the end of the First World War until the late 1940s, Irving became a permanent fixture of the London theatre scene, conducting, directing and often composing the music for operettas, musical plays and serious drama at most of the London theatres. A notable early success was the British version of Lilac Time, with music by Schubert adapted by George H. Clutsam, which opened at the Lyric Theatre on 22 December 1922 and ran for 626 performances. (Clarence Raybould was musical director for some performances). The following year he conducted Polly (sequel to The Beggar's Opera) with music restored by Frederic Austin. This began a lasting friendship between Irving and Austin.

In 1928 he was contracted by Charles Cochran to direct the music for This Year of Grace by Noël Coward, which ran for ten months at the London Pavilion. Another Cochran production followed, Cole Porter's Wake Up and Dream, which ran for 263 performances at the same theatre. He conducted The Immortal Hour for Sir Barry Jackson in 1933 at the Queen's Theatre. The score Irving provided for The Two Bouquets (1936), a comedy by Herbert Farjeon, was based on Victorian melodies selected by Eleanor Farjeon. There were two more collaborations with the Farjeons: An Elephant in Arcady (1939), and The Glass Slipper (1944), the latter with music for the dance interludes by Clifton Parker.

Irving was also the musical director of J. B. Priestley's then experimental play Johnson Over Jordan, which opened at the New Theatre on 22 February 1939, directed by Basil Dean and with Ralph Richardson in the title role. It soon transferred to the Saville Theatre for a relatively successful run after some extensive re-writing. The production used original music by the young Benjamin Britten, some of it orchestrated by Irving.

Irving conducted two Mozart operas (The Marriage of Figaro and Così fan tutte) at the Regent's Park Open Air Theatre in 1938 with the Chanticleer Opera Company. During the war he became musical director for the Entertainments National Service Association (ENSA). He was music director for the International Ballet company in 1945 (Her Majesty's and Princes), 1946 (Coliseum) 1947 (Adelphi), and 1948 (London Casino). Irving often worked with Thomas Beecham.

== Ealing Studios ==
In the early 1930s Basil Dean appointed Irving music director at the newly opened Ealing Film Studios. He composed many scores for classic Ealing comedies including Whisky Galore!, Turned Out Nice Again (starring George Formby) and Kind Hearts and Coronets. But like his younger counterparts Muir Mathieson at Denham and Hubert Clifford at London Film Studios (who both worked closely with film producer and director Alexander Korda) Irving also brought in some of the best known composers of the day to provide music - including John Addison, William Alwyn, Georges Auric, Benjamin Frankel, John Ireland, Gordon Jacob, Alan Rawsthorne, Ralph Vaughan Williams and William Walton. In this he had the backing of the studio's head of production Michael Balcon, who encouraged Irving to engage serious composers routinely and to use large orchestral forces and unusual scoring.

Irving secured John Ireland for The Overlanders (1946), his only film score. He orchestrated the scores written by Lord Berners for two films: The Halfway House (1943) and Nicholas Nickleby (1947). He asked Vaughan Williams to compose the music for three films, The Loves of Joanna Godden (1947), Scott of the Antarctic (1948) and Bitter Springs (1950), helping to fit the scores to the films. Vaughan Williams dedicated his Sinfonia Antartica (including music from Scott of the Antarctic) to Irving in 1953. Rawsthorne's First Quartet (1939) and Walton's Second Quartet (1947) are also dedicated to him.

== Personal life ==
At the age of 20, Ernest Irving married Bertha Newall of Blackpool at Fylde register office on 11 May 1898. There were two children, but the marriage ended in divorce. He married his second wife Muriel Heath (1898-1983), a contralto who had sung in Lilac Time, on 19 December 1930. After the marriage, which produced one daughter, Irving suffered financial difficulties and filed for bankruptcy. He acted as chess correspondent for the Illustrated London News between 1928 and 1932. On 22 March 1931 he was on the train from Euston which derailed at Linslade (near Leighton Buzzard), killing six people.

In 1951 Irving received honorary membership of the Royal Philharmonic Society, and also had an honorary degree from the Royal Academy of Music. He retired from Ealing in May 1953 due to ill-health; his successor was Dock Mathieson, brother of Muir. At the time of his death five months later Irving was working on a comic operetta (The 'Orse) and had almost completed his autobiography (posthumously published in 1959 as Cue for Music). He died at his home (4 The Lawn, Ealing Green), aged 74.

== As music director ==
- Cash on Delivery (music by Haydn Wood) (1917, Palace)
- The Catch of the Season (1917, Princes)
- The Lilac Domino (Charles Cuvillier) (1918, Empire)
- Macbeth (produced by J K Hackett, music Norman O'Neill) (1920, Aldwych)
- The Curate's Egg (music by Herman Finck) (1922, Ambassadors)
- Dédé (1922, Garrick)
- Lilac Time (1922, Lyric)
- Old Bill, M.P (1922, Lyceum)
- The Way of an Eagle (music Norman O'Neill) (1922, Adelphi)
- The Insect Play (1923, Regent)
- Polly (1923, Kingsway)
- Hamlet in Modern Dress (director Barry Jackson) (1925, Aldwych and Kingsway)
- Kismet (1925, New Oxford)
- The Marvellous History of St Bernard (Henri Ghéon, translated Jackson) (1926, Aldwych)
- Riki-Tiki (Eduard Künneke) (1926, Gaiety)
- Yellow Sands (1926, Haymarket)
- Castles in the Air (1927, Shaftebury)
- Beau Geste (adapted by Basil Dean with Laurence Olivier in the lead role) (1928, Her Majesty's)
- This Year of Grace (1928, London Pavilion)
- The Circle of Chalk (with Anna May Wong) (1929, New Theatre)
- The Student Prince (1929, Piccadilly)
- Wake Up and Dream (with Tilly Losch) (1929, London Pavilion)
- The Maid of the Mountains (1930, Hippodrome)
- Autumn Crocus (1931, Lyric)
- The Land of Smiles (with Richard Tauber) (1931, Drury Lane)
- The Chocolate Soldier (1932, Shaftesbury)
- The Dubarry (with Anny Ahlers) (1932, Her Majesty's)
- The Immortal Hour (1932, Queen's)
- Hansel and Gretel (1933, Cambridge)
- Shakespearean season (1934, Alhambra)
- Henry IV (with George Robey) (1935, Her Majesty's)
- The Two Bouquets (Herbert Farjeon and Eleanor Farjeon) (1936, Ambassadors)
- The Laughing Cavalier (music by Wainwright Morgan) (1937, Adelphi)
- An Elephant in Arcady (Herbert and Eleanor Farjeon) (1938, Kingsway, Savoy)
- Johnson Over Jordan (1939, New Theatre, Saville Theatre)
- The Glass Slipper (Herbert Farjeon and Eleanor Farjeon) (1944, St James's')
- The Cure for Love (1945, Westminster)

== Selected filmography ==
- Escape (1930)
- Birds of Prey (1930)
- A Honeymoon Adventure (1931)
- The Water Gipsies (1932)
- Nine till Six (1932)
- The Sign of Four (1932)
- The Impassive Footman (1932)
- Love on the Spot (1932)
- Autumn Crocus (1934)
- Sing As We Go (1934)
- Lorna Doone (1934)
- Java Head (1934)
- Love, Life and Laughter (1934)
- No Limit (1935)
- Midshipman Easy (1935)
- It Happened in Paris (1935)
- Death Drives Through (1935)
- Look Up and Laugh (1935)
- Keep Your Seats, Please (1936)
- Whom the Gods Love (1936)
- Tomorrow We Live (1936)
- Queen of Hearts (1936)
- Feather Your Nest (1937)
- Keep Fit (1937)
- The Show Goes On (1937)
- I See Ice (1938)
- The Gaunt Stranger (1938)
- It's in the Air (1938)
- The Ware Case (1938)
- Let's Be Famous (1939)
- Come on George! (1939)
- Trouble Brewing (1939)
- The Four Just Men (1939)
- Young Man's Fancy (1939)
- Return to Yesterday (1940)
- Convoy (1940)
- Saloon Bar (1940)
- The Great Mr. Handel (1942)
- Kind Hearts and Coronets (1949)
