= No Limit (1935 film) =

1935 British musical comedy film by Monty Banks

- Film poster for No Limit
- Directed by: Monty Banks
- Written by: Tom Geraghty; Fred Thompson; Walter Greenwood
- Produced by: Basil Dean
- Starring: George Formby; Florence Desmond; Edward Rigby
- Cinematography: Robert Martin
- Edited by: Jack Kitchin
- Music by: Ernest Irving; Ord Hamilton
- Production company: Associated Talking Pictures
- Distributed by: ABFD
- Release date: 28 October 1935
- Running time: 80 minutes
- Country: United Kingdom
- Language: English
- Budget: £30,000

No Limit is a 1935 British musical comedy film directed by Monty Banks and starring George Formby and Florence Desmond. It was written by Tom Geraghty, Fred Thompson based on a story by Walter Greenwood, and was made on location at the TT motorcycle race on the Isle of Man. It was the first of eleven films that Formby made for Associated Talking Pictures.

Although Formby had already made two moderately successful films (Boots! Boots! and Off the Dole), No Limit was the film that put him on the road to stardom.

== Plot ==
George Shuttleworth is a chimney sweep from Wigan who dreams of winning the Isle of Man TT. Unfortunately, George's attempts to secure a factory ride with the Rainbow Motorcycle Company are unsuccessful and consequently he resorts to entering his own machine the "Shuttleworth Snap", a motorcycle derived from an old Rainbow machine. Whilst running the engine of his machine, George inadvertently knocks the motorcycle off its stand and crashes into the fence of his next door neighbour, Mr Hardacre, who goads George about his dream of winning the T.T.

Undeterred, George asks his mother if she could lend him £5 so he can make his way to the Isle of Man in order to compete at the races. Although unable to give him the £5 directly, George's mother endeavours to take the money from his Grandpa's savings which he keeps concealed in the lining of the settee. With money 'borrowed' from his grandfather, George make his way by train to Liverpool and embarks on the steamer for Douglas.

As he prepares to embark, George's attention is drawn to the arrival of better known T.T. competitors – such as Bert Tyldesley – who embarks onto the steamer with the secretary of boss of the Rainbow Motorcycle Company, Florrie Dibney. George attempts to be included in a photograph with Tyldesley and another T.T. rider, Norton, but as they assemble for the photograph, George observes a stray cargo crate heading towards them. In order to save Florrie from being struck by the crate, George pushes her out of the way and consequently knocks her hat over the side of the ship.

More concerned at the loss of her hat than the danger posed by the cargo crate, Florrie takes George to task, and he resolves to climb down the side of the ship to retrieve the hat. As George begins to descend the side of the ship on a rope, the order is given to cast off and the deck hands begin to haul in the rope just as George reaches the ship's side belting. Holding onto the very end of the rope, it is suddenly hauled up and George falls into the water.

Evading the rivals who have paid him not to compete, George makes it to the start with seconds to spare. He rides like fury, and most of his rival riders are knocked out by crashes or blown engines. With yards to go, his bike conks out and he pushes it over the line to win; a split-second ahead of his fellow rider. He also ends up with Florrie.

== Cast ==
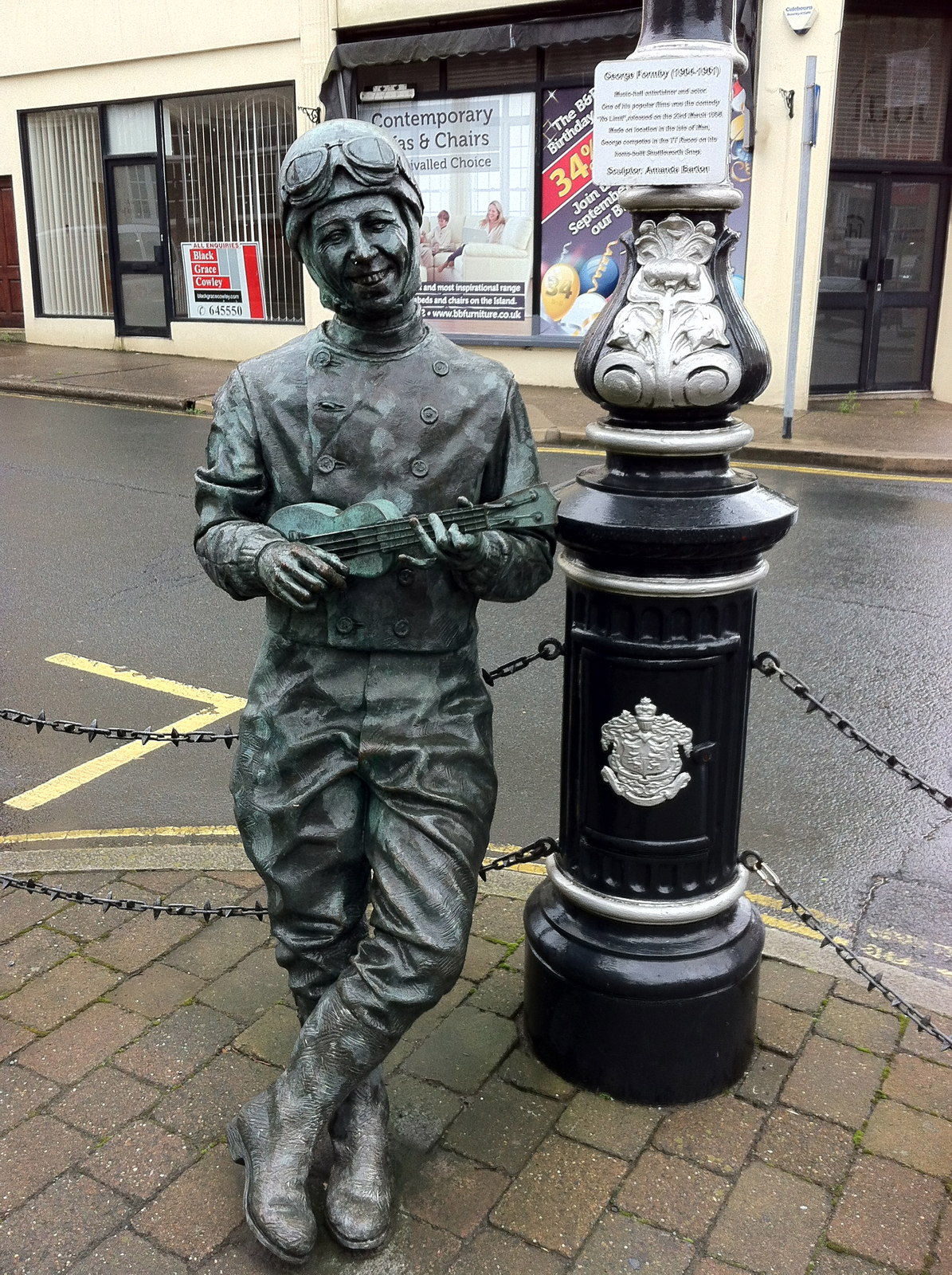
Statue of George Formby in Douglas, Isle of Man

- George Formby as George Shuttleworth
- Florence Desmond as Florrie Dibney
- Edward Rigby as Grandfather Shuttleworth
- Florence Gleason as Mrs Shuttleworth
- Beatrix Fielden-Kaye as Mrs Horrocks
- Howard Douglas as Turner
- Jack Hobbs as Bert Tyldesley
- Alf Goddard as Norton
- Peter Gawthorne as Mr Higgins
- Eve Lister as Rita
- Evelyn Roberts as BBC commentator
- Ernest Sefton as Mr Hardacre
- Arthur Young as doctor

== Production ==
The screenplay was by Tom Geraghty and Fred Thompson based on a story by Walter Greenwood, who had enjoyed literary success with Love on the Dole published the year before the film's release.

=== Filming ===
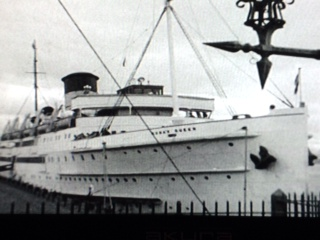
Mona's Queen pictured at the Pier Head in the 1935 film No Limit.

The 1935 Isle of Man TT was used as the backdrop by the film's producers. Many locations on the Isle of Man were featured in the film, these included Douglas Beach, White City, Douglas Head Road, Douglas Palace Ballrooms and the Douglas Camera Obscura. The Mona's Queen (1934), the newest addition to the fleet of the Isle of Man Steam Packet Company, was used for scenes shot in Liverpool.

However, filming was not an easy proposition because of Formby's wife: Beryl Ingham, who was also his business manager. Her behaviour towards the cast and crew was both difficult and domineering. Film historian Matthew Sweet described the set as a "battleground" because of her actions. Director Monty Banks approached Basil Dean, the head of Associated Talking Pictures (ATP), to have Ingham barred from the production but was unsuccessful. The experience left him bitter, he would later say, "The only time you’ll get me directing anything where that f*cking Formby woman is concerned will be when she is playing the murder victim and the scene is for real". Ingham's constant attempts to maximise the publicity surrounding Formby's appearance in the film also led to tension with fellow co-star, Florence Desmond. It finally came to a head when Ingham put billboards up on the production vans stating: "Associated Pictures now filming No Limit with George Formby". Desmond threatened to quit until Formby defused the situation by quietly removing the signs after his wife had left for the day.

=== Motorcycles ===
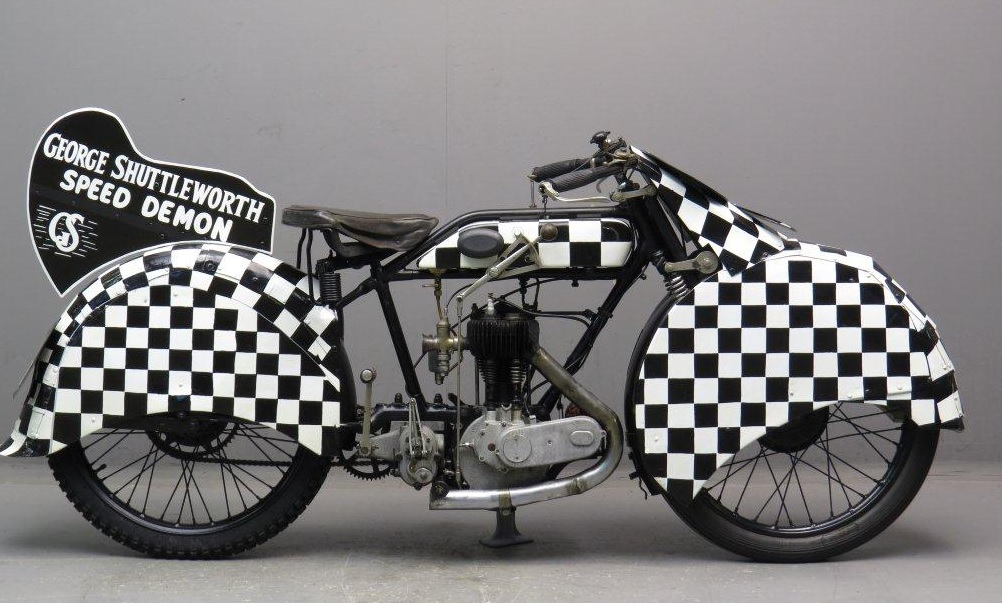
AJS H5 Shuttleworth Snap Replica

Real motorcycle manufacturers are not referenced in the film, and instead contemporary motorcycles were customised and given fictitious names - being primarily the Rainbow Motorcycle Company and the Sprocket Motorcycle Company.

For example, Formby took to the Isle of Man a 1928 AJS H5, which was referred to as a 1928 Rainbow, which had been modified and 'streamlined' by his character to become the Shuttleworth Snap. Following his exploits in the trial, Formby's character is approached by Mr. Turner, who represents the Sprocket Motorcycle Company originally to offer him a deal to ride.

Mistakenly Formby's character lays himself open to a bribe by stating that he "wouldn't ride again for fifty quid", a bribe which Turner is happy to pay, and ensures such by taking the Shuttleworth Snap up to the Marine Drive where Formby's character rides it over a cliff.

However unbeknownst to anyone, Floree has contacted her boss at Rainbow, Mr. Higgins, requesting that the company sign Formby's character and Higgins, arrives on the Island to that effect together with a brand new motorcycle which the character subsequently rides in the race.

Other bikes that were used include a 350cc Ariel that had been flown to the Isle of Man, partly dismantled, in a de Havilland Dragon Rapide.

=== Stunts ===
Many of the racing scenes in the film were performed by motorcycling riders from the Isle of Man such as brothers Bertie and Harold Rowell. They were paid £75 per day for their appearances. Members of the Peveril Motor Cycle Club also carried out some of the stunts, including Cyril Standen who crashed into the front-door of the Ballacraine Hotel and the crash into the river at Sulby. Jack Cannell also featured as a stunt rider wearing bib number 15.

Harold Rowell ended up performing more of the rider scenes than any other member of the Peveril Motorcycle and Light Car Club. At one stage members of the club, engaged in the stunts, staged a walkout in order to gain a better financial deal. They were originally offered £2 per day, but they subsequently discovered that the two professionals and a number of less experienced riders were being paid £20 per week, plus accommodation at the Majestic Hotel.

Formby did perform some stunts himself including the scene where his character weaves in and out of his rival's machines on the Cronk-y-Voddy Straight. At the climax of the film, Formby needs to win the race by pushing his bike the final 500 yards to the winning line. In the scene used in the film, Formby is seen collapsing. This was real; after doing 15 takes in hot weather, he fell down and a doctor was requested.

== Soundtrack ==
- "Riding in the TT Races", performed by George Formby and written by Fred E. Cliffe & Harry Gifford.
- "Riding Around on a Rainbow", performed by George Formby and Florence Desmond and written by Cliffe.
- "In a Little Wigan Garden", performed by George Formby and written by Cliffe & Gifford.
- "Your Way is My Way", performed by George Formby and written by Harry Parr-Davis.

== Reception ==
The film was released in late October 1935 and was an immediate commercial success. It was reissued in 1938, 1946 and 1957. In 1936, the film put Formby fourth on the list of top box-office draws at the cinema in the UK.

The Monthly Film Bulletin wrote: "The direction is very 'stagey' and probably George Formby would be happier in that medium. The humour, which he mainly supplies, is from Lancashire and is genuinely funny. The situations although obvious are amusing. The Lancashire accent seemed convincing to a non-Lancashire viewer. Beyond singing one song Miss Desmond has only to look pretty – a great waste of good material. The T.T. races play an important part and are well-handled. Photography of real and fake racing is cleverly mixed."

The Daily Film Renter wrote: "George Formby makes entertaining debut in made-to-measure role that allows him full scope for familiar clowning, song and ukelele work. Great race shots supply serio-comic thrill, complete with spills and crashes, all staged in actual Manx locales. Skilled direction imparts snap to proceedings. Grand vigorous fare for the masses, particularly in North, where star is already perennial favourite."

Picturegoer wrote: "Monty Banks has made good job of the breezy, happy-go-lucky farce, which culminates in an exhilarating piece of slapstick spectacle ... the entertainment generally is popular, put over with punch and polish."

Variety wrote: "George Formby's father was one of the highest priced comedians in England for many years. His son, who also affects a Lancashire dialect, bids fair to rank among the foremost of the present generation. He has the two most essential requisites – personal magnetism and acting ability. Besides this, he is innately funny. ... Some of the scenes leading up to the big thrill, showing an actual motorcycle race in the Isle of Man, might be condensed, but, on the whole, they are funny and calculated to generate laughs."

Although The Observer thought that parts of No Limit were "pretty dull stuff", the race footage was "shot and cut to a maximum of excitement". The reviewer thought that "our Lancashire George is a grand lad; he can gag and clown, play the banjo and sing with authority ... Still and all, he doesn't do too bad."
