= Whom the Gods Love (1936 film) =

- Opening titles
- Directed by: Basil Dean
- Written by: Margaret Kennedy; Gordon Wellesley
- Produced by: Basil Dean; Isadore Goldsmith
- Starring: Stephen Haggard; Victoria Hopper; John Loder; Liane Haid
- Cinematography: Jan Stallich
- Edited by: Thorold Dickinson
- Music by: Ernest Irving
- Production company: Associated Talking Pictures
- Distributed by: ABFD
- Release date: February 1936
- Running time: 82 minutes
- Country: United Kingdom
- Language: English

Whom the Gods Love (also known as Mozart, Whom the Gods Love – An Original Story of Mozart and His Wife, When the Gods Love and Mozart) is a 1936 British biographical film directed by Basil Dean and starring Stephen Haggard, Victoria Hopper and John Loder. It was written by Margaret Kennedy and Gordon Wellesley.

== Scenario ==
The film portrays the life of the Eighteenth Century Austrian composer Wolfgang Amadeus Mozart.

== Cast ==
- Stephen Haggard as Wolfgang Amadeus Mozart
- Victoria Hopper as Constance Mozart
- John Loder as Prince Lobkowitz
- Liane Haid as Aloysia
- Jean Cadell as Frau Mozart
- Hubert Harben as Leopold Mozart
- Frederick Leister as Emperor
- Marie Lohr as Empress
- Laurence Hanray as Archbishop of Salzburg
- George Curzon as Lorenzo Da Ponte
- Richard Goolden as Weber
- Muriel George as Frau Weber
- Raymond Huntley as Langer
- Leueen MacGrath as Josefa Weber
- Oda Slobodskaya as singer

== Reception ==
The Monthly Film Bulletin wrote: "The film is built on Mozart's music, and the London Philharmonic Orchestra, under Sir Thomas Beecham, is used to perfection in providing it. The stage performance of Figaro and The Magic Flute, in the original costumes, are admirably sung. ... But, alas, there are drawbacks. The cast struggles with Told to the Children dialogue, and fails, in consequence, to create more than superficially period characters. Stephen Haggard presents Mozart as a boisterous, if talented, public schoolboy and Victoria Hopper as Constanze fails to win the sympathy either of her husband or of the audience, in strong contrast to the polished and sympathetic portrayal of Aloysia, Constanze's elder sister, given by Liane Haid. Photography achieves interesting shots in the old theatre but too often the camera trails unsteadily after the characters. The passing years are linked with ancient sub-titles ('Grim Struggles' and all that). These faults apart, the film treats Mozart sincerely and honestly."

Kine Weekly wrote: "The film is a very superior production and much care has been taken in the cultivation of correct atmosphere. The principal players mostly have stage reputations, and the music is interpreted by the London Philharmonic Orchestra, conducted by Sir Thomas Beecham, but with all its fine breeding it is a little lacking in character."

The Daily Film Renter wrote: "Here is an entertainment calculated to appeal strongly to the discriminating patron, while music lovers will find it possessed of many angles of attraction."
