= Lucie Mannheim =

German singer and actress (1899–1976)

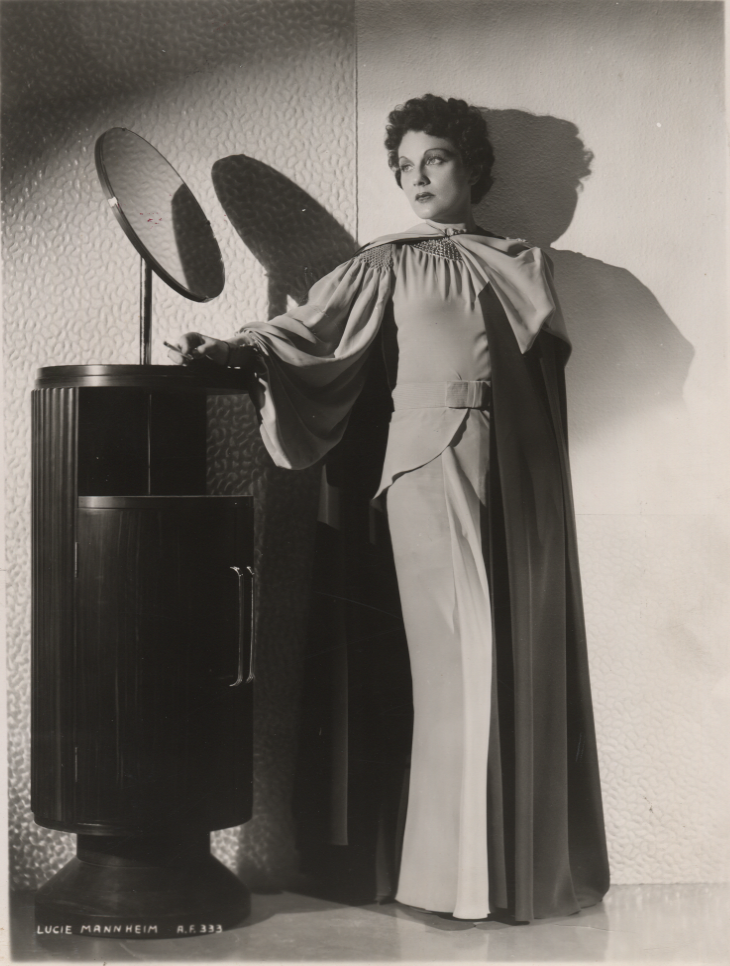
- Mannheim in 1936
- Born: 30 April 1899; Berlin, German Empire
- Died: 17 July 1976 (aged 77); Braunlage, West Germany
- Occupation: Actress
- Years active: 1923–1970
- Spouse: Marius Goring (m. 1941)

Lucie Mannheim (30 April 1899 – 17 July 1976) was a German singer and actress.

== Life and career ==
Mannheim was born in Friedrichshain, a district of Berlin, where she studied drama and quickly became a popular figure appearing on stage in plays and musicals. Among other roles, she played Nora in Ibsen's A Doll's House, Marie in Büchner's Woyzeck, and Juliet in Shakespeare's Romeo and Juliet. She also began a film career in 1923, appearing in several silent and sound films including Atlantik (1929) – the first of many versions of the story of the ill-fated RMS Titanic. The composer Walter Goetze wrote his operetta Die göttliche Jette (1931) especially for Mannheim.

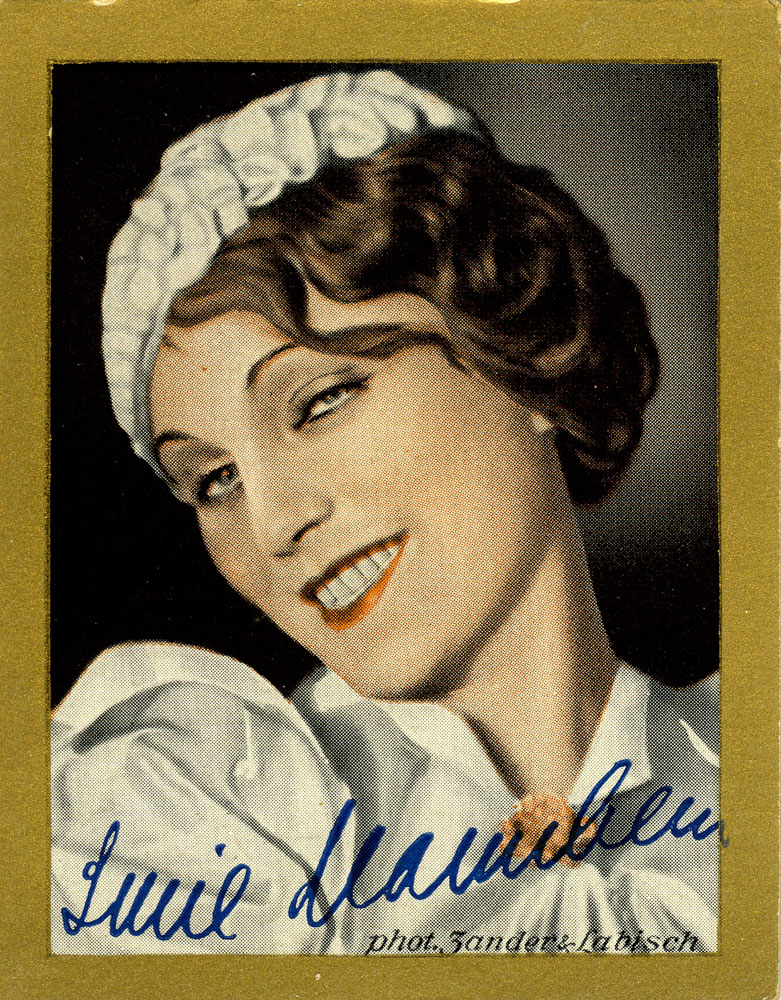
1933 illustration of Mannheim

However, as a Jew she was forced from acting in 1933, when her contract at the State Theatre was cancelled. She promptly left Germany, first going to Czechoslovakia, then to the UK. She appeared in several films there, including her role as the doomed spy Annabella Smith in Alfred Hitchcock's version of The 39 Steps (1935).

During the Second World War, she appeared in several films, as well as broadcasting propaganda to Germany with the Londoner Rundfunk – including performing an anti-Hitler version of Lili Marleen, in 1943. In 1941, she married the actor Marius Goring.

She returned to Germany in 1948 and resumed her career as an actress on stage and in film. In 1955 she joined the cast of the British television series The Adventures of the Scarlet Pimpernel as Countess La Valliere, which starred her husband. She made her final English language film appearance in the film Bunny Lake Is Missing (1965). Her last appearance was in a 1970 TV film. She died in Braunlage, Lower Saxony.

== Filmography ==
- Between Two Worlds (1919)
- The Stone Rider (1923) as Hirtin
- The Treasure (1923) as Beate
- Princess Suwarin (1923) as Esterka Kipman
- The Expulsion (1923, Short) as Änne
- The Doll Maker of Kiang-Ning (1923)
- Atlantik (1929) as Monica, young married couple
- Danton (1931) as Louise Gely
- Der Ball (1931) as Jeanne Kampf
- Madame Wants No Children (1933) as Luise
- The 39 Steps (1935) as Miss Smith
- East Meets West (1936) as Marguerite Carter
- The High Command (1937) as Diana Cloam
- Yellow Canary (1944) as Madame Orlock
- Tawny Pipit (1944) as Russian Sniper
- Hotel Reserve (1944) as Mme Suzanne Koch
- Nights on the Road (1952) as Anna, Schlueter's wife
- So Little Time (1952) as Lotte Schönberg
- The Man Who Watched Trains Go By (1952) as Maria Popinga
- I and You (1953) as Tante Gruber
- The Perfect Couple (1954) as Alwine Steingass
- Secrets of the City (1955) as Karina
- You Can No Longer Remain Silent (1955) as Lobba, die Magd
- Doctor Bertram (1957) as Frau Losch
- Confess, Doctor Corda (1958) as Haushälterin Bieringer
- Ihr 106. Geburtstag (1958) as Clementine Burger
- Iron Gustav (1958) as Frau Marie Hartmann
- A Doctor of Conviction (1959) as Frau Friedberg – seine Mutter
- Beyond the Curtain (1960) as Frau von Seefeldt
- The Last Witness (1960) as Frau Bernhardy
- Bunny Lake Is Missing (1965) as Cook
- First Love (1970)

== Awards ==
Mannheim was awarded the West German Commander's Cross of the Order of Merit in 1959, and made a Staatsschauspieler ("State Actor") for Berlin in 1963.
