= Love, Life and Laughter (1934 film) =

1934 film

- Directed by: Maurice Elvey
- Written by: Maurice Braddell; Robert Edmunds; Gordon Wellesley
- Produced by: Basil Dean
- Starring: Gracie Fields; John Loder; Ivor Barnard; Fred Duprez
- Cinematography: Robert Martin
- Music by: Ernest Irving; Jimmy Harper
- Production company: Associated Talking Pictures
- Distributed by: ABFD
- Release date: March 1934
- Running time: 83 minutes
- Country: United Kingdom
- Language: English

Love, Life and Laughter is a 1934 British comedy drama film directed by Maurice Elvey and starring Gracie Fields, John Loder and Ivor Barnard. It was written by Maurice Braddell, Robert Edmunds and Gordon Wellesley.

== Plot summary ==
Nell, the daughter of an English pub owner falls in love with the visiting Prince of Granau.

== Cast ==
- Gracie Fields as Nellie Gwynn
- John Loder as Prince Charles
- Ivor Barnard as Troubetski
- Fred Duprez as Sam Greenbaum
- Allan Aynesworth as King Boris
- Esmé Percy as Goebschen
- Veronica Brady as Mrs. Gwyn
- Horace Kenney as Mr. Gwyn
- Eric Maturin as The Director
- Robb Wilton as Magistrate
- Norah Howard as Princess Grapfel
- A. Bromley Davenport as Menkenburg
- Elizabeth Jenns as actress
- Raymond Lovell as Saville
- Jack Raine as aide
- Ben Field as Mayor Of Granau
- George Sanders as singer in public bar

== Reception ==
Film Weekly wrote: "Look at it through normal, critical eyes and it is definitely poor. Look at it as a means of bringing Gracie Fields, with her incompatible manner, her robust tomboy humour and her quite remarkable voice, into the cinema, and it is potentially entertaining. But surely it should be possible to set the Gracie Fields act in a better context. Admitting the excellence of the performance and the fascination of the personality, one must protest that both would benefit if they were given a better background. In Love, Life and Laughter, the background – meaning all the subsidiary details of the production – is distressingly weak."

Kine Weekly wrote: "Musical comedy extravaganza, with a Ruritanian flavour, which traverses pleasantly the fields of romance, satire and slapstick, finding a motive in an ingenious and pleasantly contrived Cinderella theme. The construction of the entertainment is a trifle lacking in firm unity, but its weaknesses in this department are brilliantly offset by the genius versatility and amazing showmanship of Gracie Fields, who once again reveals her pre-eminence as an entertainer. The supporting cast, if not too fully utilised, is nevertheless, a particularly strong one, the staging is expensive, and adds colour to the production, and the song numbers, all likely hits, are particularly tuneful. A picture that will delight the star's staunch army of fans and prove a box-office success."

The Daily Film Renter wrote: "Gay illogicalities, interlarded with plentiful knockabout and back-stairs comedy, and played against lavish backgrounds. Star is whole show, rendering several songs of popular calibre, and indulging eccentric comicalities to full, especially in mock police court interlude. Entirely safe box-office for any hall."

Picture Show wrote: "Gracie Fields, it is perhaps superfluous to say, is all that matters in this comedy. The story itself is negligible and quite improbable, but it is pleasant and embellished with a generous measure of knockabout comedy, burlesque, and romance. The cast is excellent."
