= Queen of Hearts (1936 film) =

1936 British film by Monty Banks

- Trade advertisement
- Directed by: Monty Banks
- Written by: Douglas Furber; Gordon Wellesley; Clifford Grey; Anthony Kimmins; H. F. Maltby
- Produced by: Basil Dean
- Starring: Gracie Fields; John Loder; Enid Stamp-Taylor; Fred Duprez
- Cinematography: John W. Boyle
- Music by: Ernest Irving
- Production company: Associated Talking Pictures
- Distributed by: Associated British
- Release date: 5 October 1936
- Running time: 78 minutes
- Country: United Kingdom
- Language: English

Queen of Hearts is a 1936 British musical comedy film directed by Monty Banks and starring Gracie Fields, John Loder and Enid Stamp-Taylor. It was written by Douglas Furber, Gordon Wellesley, Clifford Grey, Anthony Kimmins and H. F. Maltby.

== Plot summary ==
Grace Perkins is an ordinary working class seamstress who is mistaken as a rich patron of the arts. When she's asked to back a new show she plays along with the charade, hoping that she can become the production's leading lady. When the show opens Grace is a huge hit and goes on to become a glamorous star.

== Cast ==
- Gracie Fields as Grace Perkins
- John Loder as Derek Cooper
- Enid Stamp-Taylor as Yvonne
- Fred Duprez as Zulenberg
- Edward Rigby as Perkins
- Julie Suedo as Rita Dow
- Jean Lester as Mrs. Perkins
- Hal Gordon as Stage Manager
- Syd Crossley as Constable
- Madeline Seymour as Mrs. Vandeleur
- H. F. Maltby as solicitor
- Margaret Yarde as Mrs. Porter

== Reception ==
The Monthly Film Bulletin wrote: "The story is by no means strong, but it provides opportunities for Gracie Fields to show her skill and versatility, and of these opportunities she makes good use. Her song-numbers are tuneful, and she puts them over with characteristic energy and effect. ... The direction is straightforward and workmanlike. While not outstanding, this is a thoroughly entertaining film of its kind."

Kine Weekly wrote: "Spectacular backstage romantic comedy with music, treated mainly in a slapstick vein. Monty Banks, the star's new director, has, in his treatment of the simple story, put knockabout fooling on a level with sentiment and song, and this hearty touch, to which the star, at her best, so generously responds, means so much to the unqualified success of the entertainment. A riot, splashed with melody, from beginning to end, the film is certain to please all classes in addition to Gracie Fields' ever-widening circle of fans."

The Daily Film Renter wrote: "Outstanding box-office, which is beyond question Gracie's best yet. Gracie Fields essays something entirely new in this, her latest and greatest screen comedy, investing her role with deft character touches, and revealing an attractively dignified poise, but sacrificing none of her boisterously effervescent personality. ... Monty Banks' direction is at all times first rate, but particularly so in the more uproarious comedy sequences, although it must be confessed the finish (where a policeman is intent on capturing the star during her performance) falls more than a little flat."
