= Autumn Crocus (play) =

1931 play

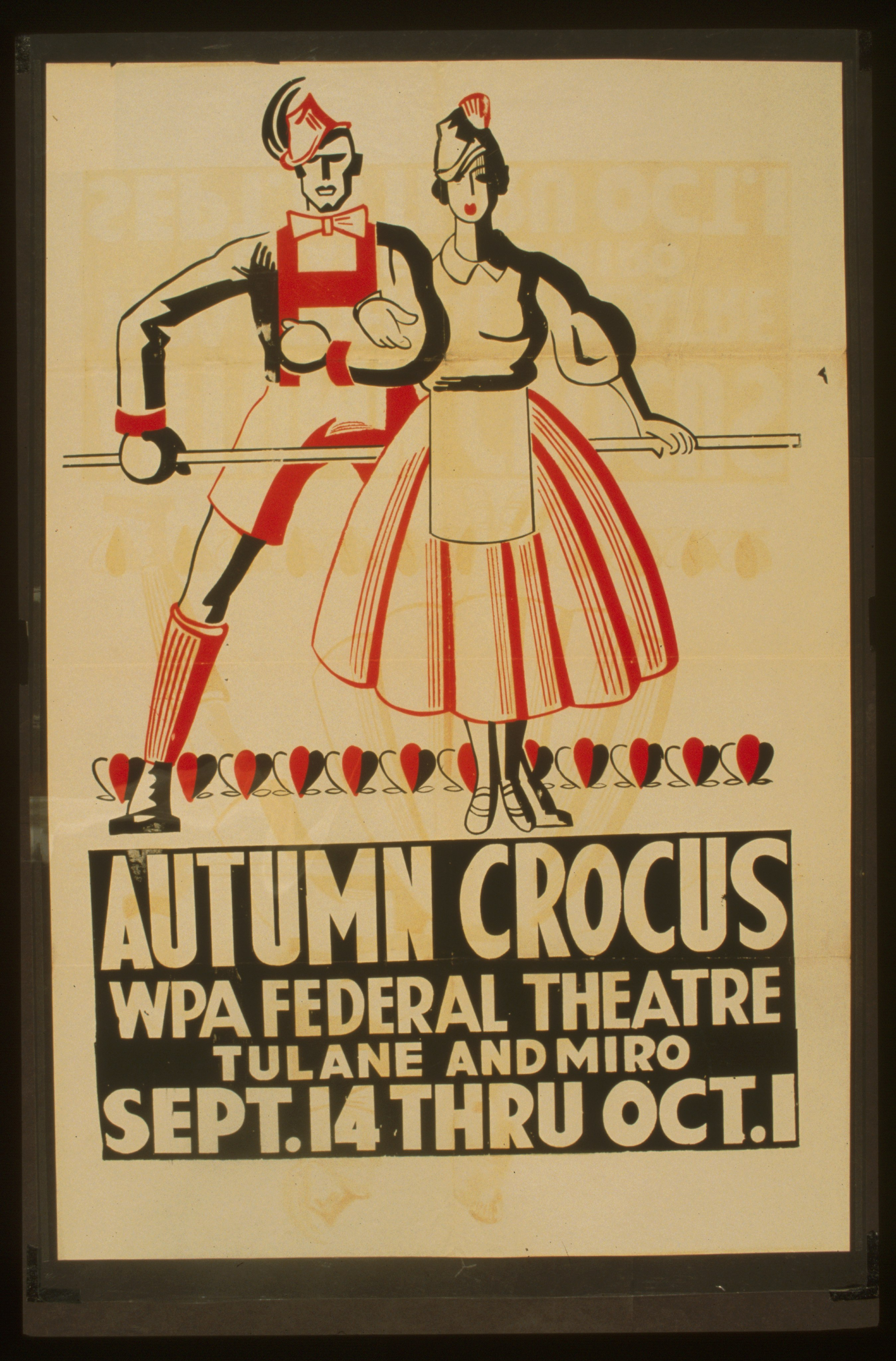
Poster for the Federal Theatre Project presentation of "Autumn Crocus" at the WPA Federal Theatre.

Autumn Crocus is a 1931 play by the British writer Dodie Smith. It was Smith's first play written under the pseudonym of C.L. Anthony. It follows a single schoolteacher who goes on holiday to the Tyrol and falls in love with the married owner of the hotel in which she is staying.

Directed by Basil Dean, it opened at the Lyric Theatre, London, on 6 April 1931, starring Fay Compton, Francis Lederer and Martita Hunt. Stage designs were by Gladys Calthrop. Such was its success that the management decided to put an additional 35 seats into the stalls.

== Adaptations ==
In 1934, it was adapted into a film by Basil Dean's Associated Talking Pictures, which he also directed by Basil Dean. This version stars Fay Compton and Ivor Novello.

In 1952, it was televised by the BBC for Sunday Night Theatre, starring Margaret Johnston and Anton Diffring. Other roles were played by Jean Anderson (Edith), Anna Korda (Frau Steiner), Cecil Bevan and Phyllis Morris (the clergyman Reverend Mayne and his sister Miss Mayne), Terence Alexander and Diana Calderwood as Alaric and Audrey, and Frederick Schiller singing Schumann. It was produced by Harold Clayton with settings by Frederick Knapman, and was broadcast on August 24 and 28, 1952.

Also in 1952, the BBC broadcast Autumn Crocus in the Saturday Night Theatre radio drama slot. This radio version was produced by Martyn C. Webster and starred Marjorie Westbury.

== Bibliography ==
- Chambers, Colin. Continuum Companion to Twentieth Century Theatre. Continuum, 2002.
- Sweet, Matthew. Shepperton Babylon: The Lost Worlds of British Cinema. Faber and Faber, 2005.
- Robert Tanitch London Stage in the 20th Century Haus Publishing 2007 ISBN 978-1-904950-74-5
