= Sing As We Go =

1934 film by Basil Dean

- Trade show advertisement
- Directed by: Basil Dean
- Written by: J. B. Priestley; Gordon Wellesley
- Produced by: Basil Dean
- Starring: Gracie Fields; John Loder; Dorothy Hyson; Stanley Holloway
- Cinematography: Robert Martin
- Edited by: Thorold Dickinson
- Music by: Ernest Irving
- Production company: Associated Talking Pictures
- Distributed by: ABFD
- Release date: September 1934
- Running time: 80 minutes
- Country: United Kingdom
- Language: English

Sing As We Go is a 1934 British musical film directed and produced by Basil Dean, and starring Gracie Fields, John Loder and Stanley Holloway. It was written by Gordon Wellesley and J. B. Priestley. It was reissued in 1940.

== Plot ==
When the mill in which she works closes, Gracie Platt goes to Blackpool looking for work, and finds employment at a fun-fair. Hugh, the mill-owner's son, falls for Gracie's room-mate Phyllis, and she assists their romance, although in love with Hugh herself. When the artificial-silk millionaire Sir William Upton happens to meet Hugh, they strike a deal and Upton takes over and re-opens the mill. Gracie returns to Manchester, comforted by the thought that she has helped provide work again for the mill-workers.

== Cast ==
- Gracie Fields as Gracie Platt
- John Loder as Hugh Phillips
- Dorothy Hyson as Phyllis Logan
- Stanley Holloway as policeman
- Frank Pettingell as Uncle Murgatroyd Platt
- Lawrence Grossmith as Sir William Upton
- Morris Harvey as the cowboy
- Arthur Sinclair as The Great Maestro
- Maire O'Neill as Madame Osiris
- Ben Field as Nobby
- Olive Sloane as violet, the song-plugger's girlfriend
- Margaret Yarde as Mrs. Clotty
- Evelyn Roberts as Parkinson
- Norman Walker as Hezekiah Crabtree
- Florence Gregson as Aunt Alice

== Reception ==
Kine Weekly wrote: "This picture is unquestionably Gracie Fields' best. J. B. Priestley, the author, has taken a light conventional plot and that used it cleverly as a means to present an amusing, human and interesting mass study of North-country character. The gay whirligig of actual life has Blackpool, the mecca of thousands of holiday-mkers her for its scintillating, substantial pivot, and it rotates at a merry speed to the accompaniment of catchy melodies. Gracie Fields has a great part, one that enables her to sing and exploit her amazing versatility, and she puts it over with tremendous gusto. The supporting characters are brilliantly drawn, the dialogue is excellent, and the photography superb."

The Daily Film Renter wrote: "Gracie Fields's greatest picture yet. Diverting story, specially written for star by J. B. Priestley, shows her bringing back prosperity to bankrupt cotton mill. Main locale is Blackoool, which has been brought to screen in magnificently vivid fashion, replete with all its colorful attractions. Gracie scores superb personality triumph, alternating comedy and pathos with consummate skill, while rendering of occasional songs is joyously infectious."

In The Radio Times Guide to Films David Parkinson gave the film 3/5 stars, writing: "Gracie Fields is the life and soul of this dated but spirited musical comedy, as she makes for the bright lights of Blackpool after the small-town mill that she works in is forced to close. J.B. Priestley's source story may not be one of his most original or complex, but Gracie's attempts to hold down a variety of seaside jobs and her encounter with benevolent tycoon Lawrence Grossmith are both amusing and politically astute."

In the 2009 BBC TV documentary The Making of Modern Britain, Andrew Marr singled out Sing As We Go as an icon of British pop culture of the 1930s, concluding: "Fairy tale or not, this is probably the worst film I have ever seen."

== In popular culture ==
- The main theme of this movie, the song "Sing As We Go" (written by Harry Parr Davies), is one of two signature songs of The Kampen Janitsjarorkester Symphonic Band of Kampen, Oslo, Norway.
- The melody of the song was used by the comedy group Monty Python in a parody song called "Sit on My Face".
