= Aspidistra (disambiguation) =

Aspidistra is a plant genus (from the Greek aspidion, a small round shield).

Aspidistra may also refer to:

- Aspidistra elatior, an Aspidistra species used as a houseplant
- Aspidistra (transmitter), a radio transmitter codenamed Aspidistra and used by Britain in the Second World War to beam propaganda to Germany
- An Aspidistra in Babylon, novel by H. E. Bates
- Keep the Aspidistra Flying, novel by George Orwell
- "The Biggest Aspidistra in the World", 1938 song by Gracie Fields
