= Laura Sadler =

English actress (1980–2003)

- Sadler as Judi Jeffreys in Grange Hill
- Born: Laura Ruth Sadler; 25 December 1980; Ascot, Berkshire, England
- Died: 19 June 2003 (aged 22); London, England
- Occupation: Actress
- Years active: 1987–2003
- Television: Judi Jeffreys in Grange Hill; Sandy Harper in Holby City

Laura Ruth Sadler (25 December 1980 – 19 June 2003) was an English actress. She played pupil Judi Jeffreys in the children's school drama series Grange Hill, and nurse Sandy Harper in the BBC One hospital drama series Holby City for three years from 2000 until her death in 2003.

== Life and career ==
Sadler was born in Ascot, Berkshire, and grew up in High Wycombe, Buckinghamshire. As a young girl she enrolled at the Jackie Palmer Stage School in High Wycombe, before joining the Sylvia Young Theatre School in London. She was spotted as a future talent at the age of six by Dustin Hoffman, who had seen her in a play and asked to meet her. Before joining the cast of Holby City, she had played Judi Jeffreys in the children's television series Grange Hill from 1997 to 1999. Her Grange Hill character died after slipping and falling out of a burning building. She also played the part of Skirty Marm in a BBC1 children's comedy, Belfry Witches. Skirty Marm and her friend Old Noshie (Lucy Davis) were teenage witches banished to Earth from Witch Island, settling in a sleepy village where they caused mischief.

In 1996, she starred in the feature film Intimate Relations alongside Julie Walters, where she played a girl with a crush on her mother's adulterous lover. She joined the cast of Holby City, a spin-off series from the long-running BBC medical drama series Casualty, in the show's third series, playing the nurse Sandy Harper up until her death.

Eight further Holby City episodes featuring Sadler as Sandy had already been filmed, and were aired as scheduled posthumously. BBC scriptwriters consulted Sadler's mother, Sonja Sadler, when devising the character's exit storyline. Mal Young said: "I went there thinking we were all going to be in tears and it turned into an unofficial storyline conference. I said we would find a way of explaining Laura's absence and her mum came up with an idea we all liked." Sandy's farewell episode, "A Friend in Need", revealed that the character had won £150,000 in the lottery, and left for Australia to follow former love interest Danny Shaughnessy. After discovering various amounts of money she had left behind for her friends at Holby City Hospital, the characters gathered together in the hospital bar at the end of the episode, and raised a toast "To the one and only Sandy!"

== Death ==
In the early hours of 15 June 2003, Sadler fell 40 feet (12 metres) from the second-floor balcony of the Holland Park flat of her boyfriend and Holby City colleague George Calil. She had consumed a large quantity of alcohol and was later found to have had traces of diazepam and cocaine derivatives in her blood. She suffered severe head injuries and never regained consciousness. Her family decided to take her off life support on 18 June 2003, and she died at Charing Cross Hospital a day later. Her funeral was held at St. Mary's and All Saints' Church in Beaconsfield, and she was cremated at Chilterns Crematorium, Amersham. Calil was questioned by police, but later released on bail and never charged. Sadler's death was ruled as an accident.

Sadler's character, Sandy Harper, continued to appear in eight pre-recorded episodes of Holby City after her death. Her mother aided the show's writers in conceiving an exit storyline for the character. In the episode, which was broadcast in September 2003, Sandy was revealed to have won the lottery and subsequently emigrated to Australia.

== Filmography ==
Year	Title	Note(s)
1989	Inspector Morse	Sabena; 1 episodes
1989	Magic Moments	Girl; TV film
1993	The Sahara Project	Laura; 4 episodes
1995	Goggle Watch/Simply The Best: CITV 40 Years	Gaby Goggle
1996	Intimate Relations	Joyce; Feature film
1997–1999	Grange Hill	Judi Jeffreys; 30 episodes
1999	The Ruth Rendell Mysteries	Brenda; 1 episodes
1999–2000	Belfry Witches	Skirty Marm; 13 Episodes
2000–2003	Holby City	Sandy Harper; 99 Episodes
