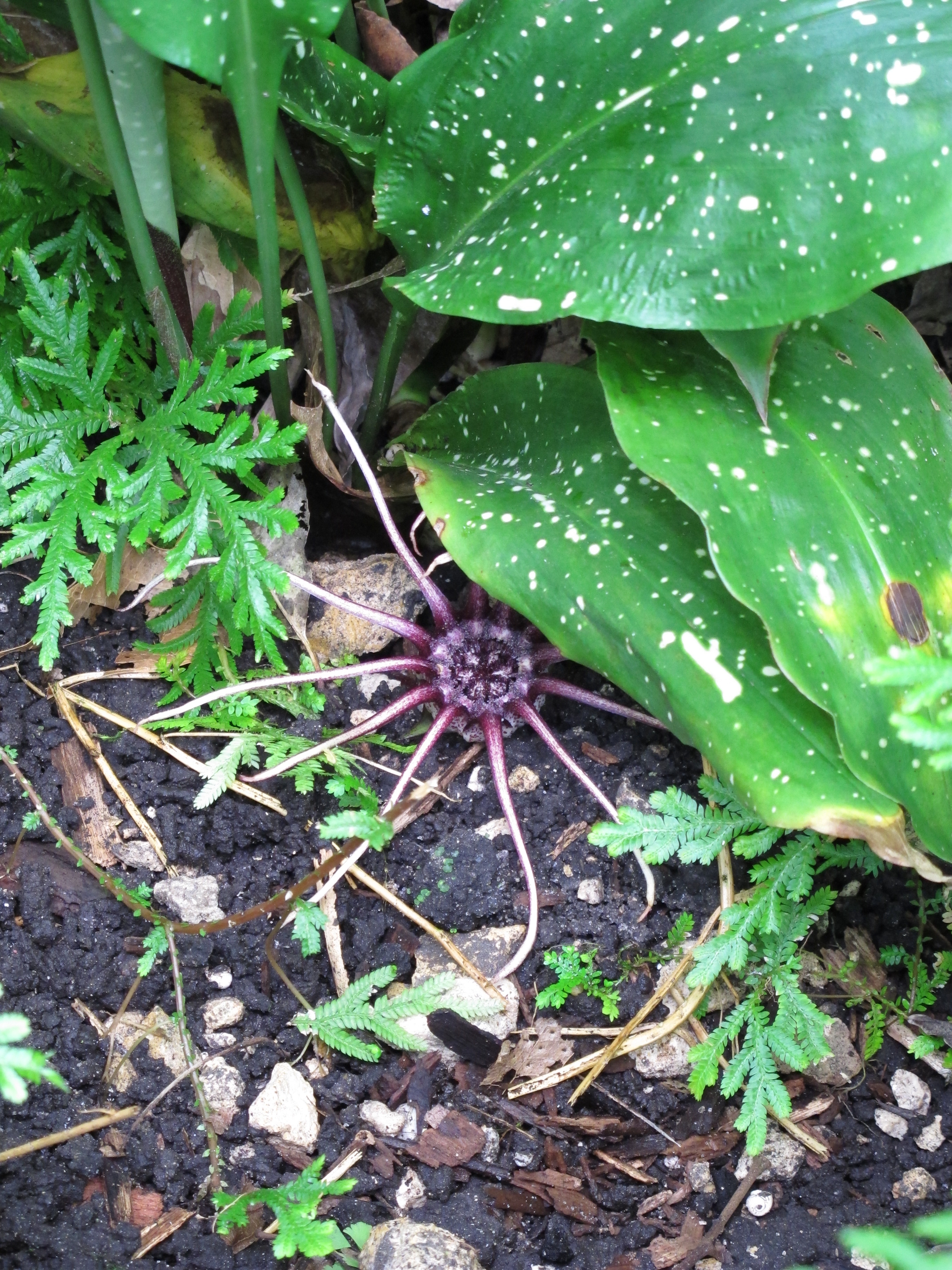

Scientific classification
- Kingdom: Plantae
- Clade: Embryophytes
- Clade: Tracheophytes
- Clade: Spermatophytes
- Clade: Angiosperms
- Clade: Monocots
- Order: Asparagales
- Family: Asparagaceae
- Subfamily: Convallarioideae
- Genus: Aspidistra
- Species: A. grandiflora

Binomial name
- Aspidistra grandiflora Tillich, Averyanov & Dzu, 2007

= Aspidistra grandiflora =

Species of flowering plant

Aspidistra grandiflora is a species of flowering plant. A. grandiflora grows in Vietnam in dry broad-leaved lowland forests on karstic limestone outcrops with fissures.

== Description ==
This species is a perennial herb. Its rhizome is creeping. Its leaves are solitary, the petiole measuring about 30 centimetres (12 in); the lamina is obovate, measuring 50 by 11 centimetres (19.7 by 4.3 in), being narrowly cuneate, tapering towards the petiole.

Its decumbent peduncle measures 7 centimetres (2.8 in) long; its flowers are solitary or in groups of 2 or 3; perigone tube is urceolate, twice as wide as high, its diameter measuring up to 30 millimetres (1.2 in), counting with 11 or 12 whitish and purplish mottled lobes, each one counting with a basal white appendage. It counts with 11 or 12 stamens, while its anthers are subsessile and ovoid, each up to 3 millimetres (0.12 in) long; the ovar is indistinct. The style is 3 by 5 millimetres (0.12 by 0.20 in) long, while the stigma is disc-shaped and is 8 millimetres (0.31 in) thick, its central part white with 5 purple ribs, with 22-24 teeth.

== Distribution ==
Aspidistra grandiflora is known only from its type locality, in Mai Châu District, Hòa Bình Province, Vietnam.
