= Aspidistra cryptantha =

Scientific classification
- Kingdom: Plantae
- Clade: Embryophytes
- Clade: Tracheophytes
- Clade: Spermatophytes
- Clade: Angiosperms
- Clade: Monocots
- Order: Asparagales
- Family: Asparagaceae
- Subfamily: Convallarioideae
- Genus: Aspidistra
- Species: A. cryptantha

Binomial name
- Aspidistra cryptantha Tillich, Averyanov & Dzu, 2007

Species of flowering plant

Aspidistra cryptantha is a species of flowering plant. A. cryptantha grows in evergreen on slopes of limestone mountains in Vietnam between heights of 600 and 800 metres (2,000 and 2,600 ft).

== Description ==
This species is a perennial herb. Its rhizome is creeping, with a diameter of 5 millimetres (0.20 in). Its cataphylls are short-lived, leaving remnants at the base of young leaves. Its leaves are delicate, 1 to 1.5 millimetres (0.039 to 0.059 in) apart, the petiole measuring about 18 to 25 centimetres (7.1 to 9.8 in); the lamina is ovate-lanceolate and acuminate, measuring 17 to 20 centimetres (6.7 to 7.9 in) by 5 to 6 centimetres (2.0 to 2.4 in), and being rounded and cuneate, with several white spots and yellowish nerves in its lower surface. It also counts with 4 to 6 veins at each side.

Its ascending peduncle measures 1 to 2 centimetres (0.39 to 0.79 in); its perigone tube is subgloboid, its greatest diameter measuring up to 7 millimetres (0.28 in), counting with 6 lobes with 2 keels. Its anthers amount to 6 and are subsessile, each up to 1 millimetre (0.039 in) long; the pistil is flat and rectangular, the ovar is indistinct. The style is cylindrical, 2 to 3 millimetres (0.079 to 0.118 in) long, while the stigma is flat and measures 2 to 3 millimetres (0.079 to 0.118 in) in diameter and is 3-lobed, each lobe with a distal lobulum inflexum.

== Distribution ==
Aspidistra cryptantha is known only from its type locality, in Trà Lĩnh District, Cao Bằng Province, Vietnam.
