= Gracie Fields =

English actress, singer and comedian (1898–1979)

Dame Gracie Fields DBE OStJ
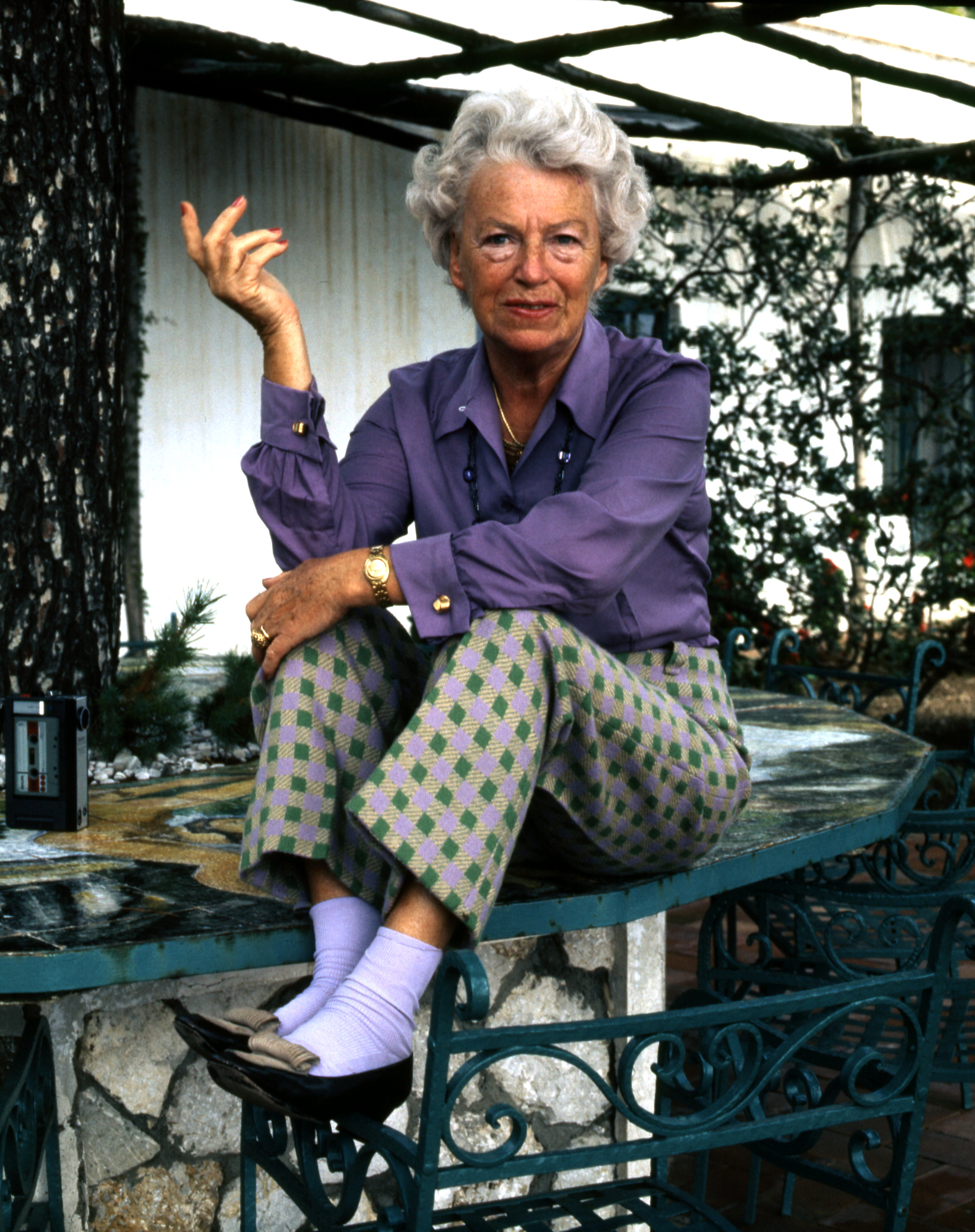
- Fields on Capri (Allan Warren, 1973)
- Born: Grace Stansfield; 9 January 1898; Rochdale, Lancashire, England
- Died: 27 September 1979 (aged 81); La Canzone Del Mare, Capri, Italy
- Occupations: Actor; singer
- Years active: 1908–1979
- Spouses: Archie Pitt (m. 1923; div. 1939) Monty Banks (m. 1940; died 1950) Boris Alperovici (m. 1952)

Dame Gracie Fields (born Grace Stansfield; 9 January 1898 – 27 September 1979) was an English actor, singer, and comedian. A star of cinema and music hall, she was one of the top ten film stars in Britain during the 1930s and was considered the highest-paid film star in the world in 1937. Fields was known affectionately as Our Gracie and the Lancashire Lass and for never losing her strong, native Lancashire accent. She was appointed a Commander of the Order of the British Empire (CBE) and an Officer of the Venerable Order of St John (OStJ) in 1938, and a Dame Commander of the Order of the British Empire (DBE) in 1979.

== Life and work ==
=== Early life ===
Fields was born Grace Stansfield, a daughter of Frederick Stansfield (1874–1956) and his wife Sarah Jane 'Jenny' Stansfield née Bamford (1879–1953), over a fish and chip shop owned by her grandmother, Sarah Bamford, in Molesworth Street, Rochdale, Lancashire. Her great-grandfather, William Stansfield (b.1805), of Hebden Bridge, Yorkshire, was a descendant of the Stansfield family of Stansfield, Yorkshire.

Fields made her first stage appearance as a child, in 1905, joining children's repertory theatre groups such as "Haley's Garden of Girls" and Clara Coverdale's "Nine Dainty Dots". Her two sisters, Edith Fields and Betty Fields, and brother, Tommy Fields, all went on to appear on stage, but Gracie was the most successful. Her professional debut in variety took place at the Rochdale Hippodrome theatre in 1910, and she soon gave up her job in the local cotton mill, where she was a half-timer, spending half a week in the mill and the other half at school. Early newspaper clippings show her appearing locally in venues such as Todmorden (December 1913), Milnrow (February 1914), and Burnley (July 1914), with an appearance at The Palace in Blackpool in April 1914. The Burnley newspaper described her as “The Girl with the Double Voice”.

Fields met the comedian and impresario Archie Pitt and they began working together in Percy Hall's touring show Yes, I Think So. Pitt gave Fields champagne on her 18th birthday, and wrote in an autograph book to her that he would make her a star. Pitt began to manage her career and they began a relationship; they married in 1923 at Clapham Register Office. Their first revue together, written by Pitt, was called It's A Bargain! in 1915, and the two continued to tour Britain together until 1931.

Throughout the period 1918–1924, they appeared in the revue Mr Tower of London, which took Fields to the West End for the first time. Other shows following with Pitt in subsequent years were The Show's The Thing and Walk This Way.

Pitt was the brother of Bert Aza, founder of the Aza Agency, which was responsible for many entertainers of the day, including the actor and comedian Stanley Holloway, who was introduced to Aza by Fields, and Betty Driver, who was discovered by Archie; she was a replacement cast member in Mr Tower of London. Fields and Holloway first worked together on her film Sing As We Go, in 1934 and the two remained close friends for the rest of their lives.

=== Fame ===
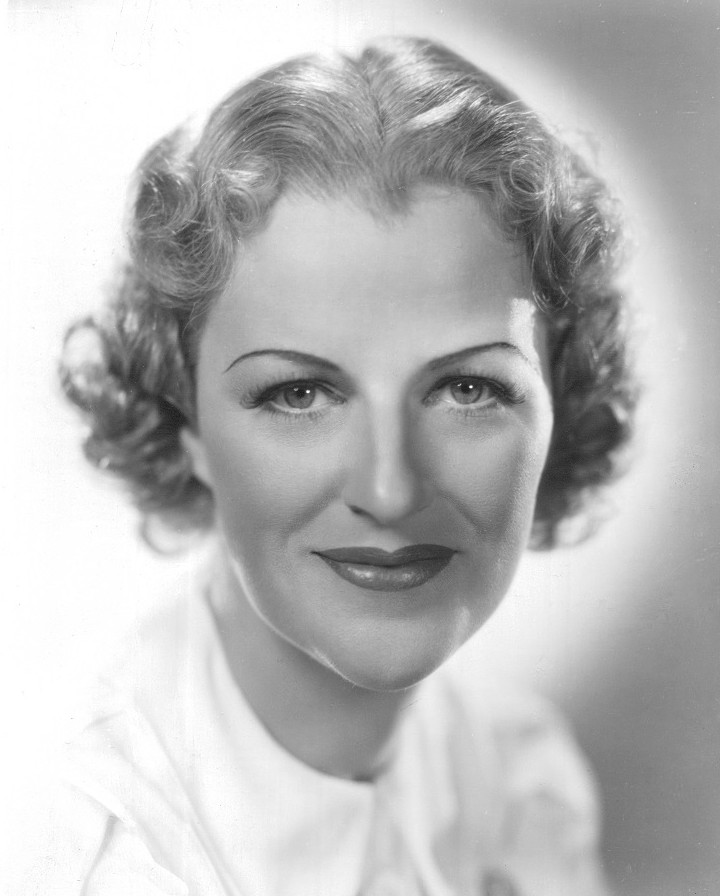
Gracie Fields in 1937

Fields came to major public notice in Mr Tower of London, a show staged in London's West End. Her career accelerated from this point, with dramatic performances and the beginning of a recording career with the His Master's Voice. She was one of the most successful recording artists at the label: her first record, My Blue Heaven sold 500,000 copies in 1928. In 1933, His Master's Voice produced the four millionth Fields record, which was pressed by the singer herself on camera and celebrated with a special 'Lancashire Lunch' at the Trocadero.

At one point, Fields was playing three shows a night in the West End. She appeared in the production SOS with Gerald Du Maurier, a play staged at the St James's Theatre.

Fields' most famous song, "Sally", which became her theme, was written for her first film, Sally in Our Alley (1931), a major box office hit. She went on to make a number of films, initially in Britain and later in the United States (when she was paid a record fee of £200,000 for four films). Regardless, she never enjoyed performing without a live audience, and found the process of film-making boring. She tried to opt out of filming, before director Monty Banks persuaded her otherwise, landing her a lucrative Hollywood deal. Fields demanded that the four pictures be filmed in Britain and not Hollywood.

The final few lines of the song "Sally", which Fields sang at every performance from 1931 onwards, were written by her husband's mistress, Annie Lipman. Fields claimed in later life that she wanted to "Drown blasted Sally with Walter with the aspidistra on top!", a reference to two other of her well-known songs, "Walter, Walter", and "The Biggest Aspidistra In The World".

The famous opera star Luisa Tetrazzini heard her singing an aria and asked her to sing in grand opera. Fields decided to stay "where I knew I belonged."

=== Charity work ===
In the 1930s, her popularity was at its peak, and she was given many honours: she became an Officer of the Venerable Order of St John (OStJ) for her charity work, and a Commander of the Order of the British Empire (CBE) for her services to entertainment in the 1938 New Year Honours, and was granted the Freedom of the Borough of Rochdale in 1937.

In 1933, she set up the Gracie Fields Children's Home and Orphanage at Peacehaven, Sussex, for children of those in the theatre profession who could not look after their children. She kept this until 1967, when the home was no longer needed. This was near her own home in Telscombe, and Fields often visited, with the children all calling her 'Aunty Grace'.

She donated her house in The Bishops Avenue, north London – which she had not much cared for, and shared with her husband Pitt and his mistress – to an orphanage after the marriage broke down. In 1939, she became seriously ill with cervical cancer. The public sent over 250,000 goodwill messages and she retired to her villa on Capri. After she recovered, she recorded a special 78 rpm record simply called "Gracie's Thanks", in which she thanks the public for the many cards and letters she received while in hospital.

Fields also helped Rochdale Association Football Club in the 1930s, when they were struggling to pay fees and buy sports equipment.

=== World War II ===
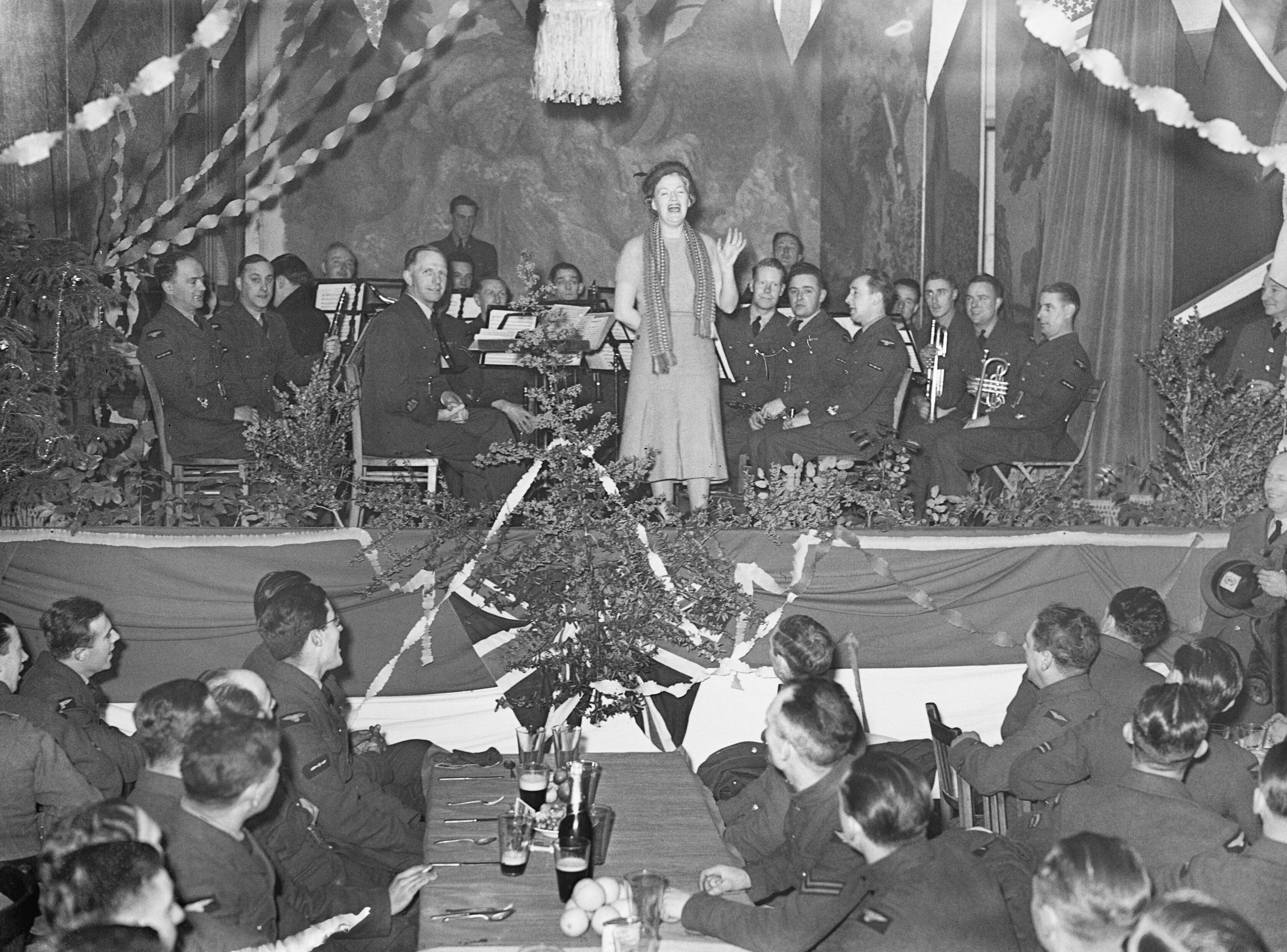
Fields, accompanied by an RAF orchestra, entertains airmen at their 1939 Christmas party

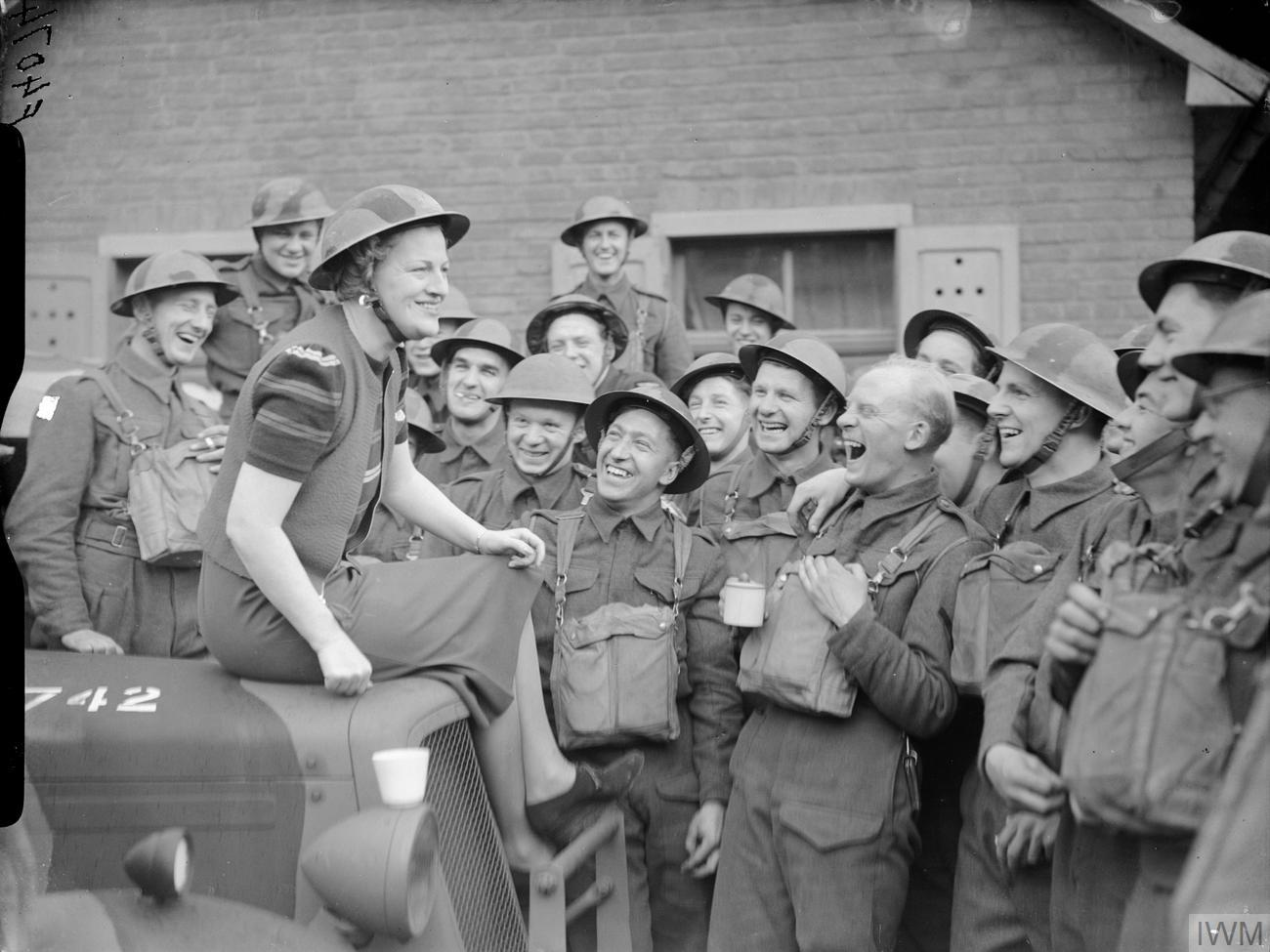
Fields shares a joke with troops in a village near Valenciennes, France, April 1940

In 1939, Fields suffered a breakdown and went to Capri to recuperate. World War II was declared while she was recovering in Capri, and Fields – still very ill after her cancer surgery – threw herself into her work and signed up for the Entertainments National Service Association (ENSA) headed by her old film producer, Basil Dean. Fields travelled to France to entertain the troops in the midst of air-raids, performing on the backs of open lorries and in war-torn areas. During the war, she also paid for all servicemen and women to travel free on public transport within the boundaries of Rochdale. Once, Fields travelled to Chester with serviceman Harrison after he had watched her perform in France. She stayed with his family of nine as a guest in their small 2 up 2 down house.

Following her divorce from Archie Pitt, she married Italian-born film director Monty Banks in March 1940. However, because Banks remained an Italian citizen and would have been interned in the United Kingdom after Italy declared war in June 1940, she went with him to North America, possibly at the suggestion of Winston Churchill, who told her to "Make American Dollars, not British Pounds", which she did, in aid of the Navy League and the Spitfire Fund. She and Banks moved to their home in Santa Monica, California. Fields occasionally returned to Britain, performing in factories and army camps around the country. After their initial argument, Parliament offered her an official apology.

Although she continued to spend much of her time entertaining troops and otherwise supporting the war effort outside Britain, this led to a decline in her popularity at home. She performed many times for Allied troops, travelling as far as New Guinea, where she received an enthusiastic response from Australian personnel. In late 1945, she toured the South Pacific Islands.

=== Post-war career ===
Lancashire writer and broadcaster Thomas Thompson made three programmes (1945, 1946, 1947) about Fields. They were friends - she, too, had been a half-timer in the mills - and he mentions their friendship in Lancashire for Me.

After the war, Fields continued her career less actively. She began performing in Britain again in 1948, headlining the London Palladium over Ella Fitzgerald who was also on the bill. The BBC gave her her own weekly radio show in 1947, dubbed Our Gracie's Working Party, in which 12 towns were visited by Fields. A live show of music and entertainment, it was compèred by Fields, who also performed, together with local talents. The tour commenced in Gracie's hometown of Rochdale. Like many BBC shows at the time, this show transferred to Radio Luxembourg in 1950, where it was sponsored by Wisk soap powder. Billy Ternent and his Orchestra accompanied her.

In 1951, Fields took part in the cabaret which closed the Festival of Britain celebrations. She proved popular once more, though never regaining the status she enjoyed in the 1930s. She continued recording, but made no more films, moving more towards light classical music as popular tastes changed, often adopting a religious theme. She continued into the new medium of LP records, and recorded new versions of her old favourite songs, as well as contemporary tracks, to 'liven things up a bit'.

Her husband, Monty Banks, died on 8 January 1950 of a heart attack, while travelling on the Orient Express. On 18 February 1952 in Capri, Fields married Boris Alperovici (d.1983), a Romanian radio repairman. She claimed that he was the love of her life, and that she could not wait to propose to him. She proposed on Christmas Day in front of friends and family. They married at the Church of St Stefano on Capri in a quiet ceremony, before honeymooning in Rome.

She lived on her beloved Isle of Capri for the remainder of her life, at her home La Canzone Del Mare (The Song of the Sea), where her home overlooked the swimming and restaurant complex. It was favoured by many Hollywood stars during the 1950s, with regular guests including Richard Burton, Elizabeth Taylor, Greta Garbo and Noël Coward.

=== Later years ===
Fields began to work less, but still toured the UK under the management of Harold Fielding (manager of top artists of the day such as Tommy Steele and Max Bygraves). Her UK tours proved popular, and in the mid-1960s she gave farewell tours in Australia, Canada and America; the last performance was recorded and released years later.

In 1956, Fields was the first actor to portray Miss Marple on screen, in a US television (Goodyear Playhouse) production of Agatha Christie's A Murder is Announced. The production featured Jessica Tandy and Roger Moore, and predates the Margaret Rutherford films by five years. She also starred in Television productions of A Tale of Two Cities (DuPont Show of the Month, 1958), The Old Lady Shows Her Medals (United States Steel Hour) – for which she won a Sylvania Award (1956) and received an EMMY Award nomination for Best Single Performance by an Actress (1957) – and Mrs 'Arris Goes to Paris (Studio One), which was remade years later with Angela Lansbury as Mrs Harris, a charwoman in search of a fur coat (or a Christian Dior gown in Lansbury's case).

In 1957, Fields' single "Around the World" peaked at No.8 in the UK Singles Chart, with her recording of "Little Donkey" reaching No.20 in November 1959.

She was the subject of This Is Your Life on 20 March 1960, when she was surprised by Eamonn Andrews at the BBC Television Theatre.

Fields regularly performed in TV appearances, being the first entertainer to perform on Val Parnell's Sunday Night at the London Palladium. Fields had two Christmas TV specials in 1960 and 1961, singing her old favourites and new songs in front of a studio audience. 1971 saw A Gift For Gracie, another TV special presented by Fields and Bruce Forsyth. This followed on from her popularity on Stars on Sunday, a religious programme on Britain's ITV, in which well-known performers sang hymns or read extracts from the Bible. Fields was the most requested artist on the show.

In 1968, Fields headlined a two-week Christmas stint at the West Riding of Yorkshire's prestigious Batley Variety Club. "I was born over a fish and chip shop – I never thought I'd be singing in one!" claimed Fields during the performance, which was recorded by the BBC.

Fields recorded an album, Stars on Sunday, which was released on York BYK 707 in 1971. It included the songs "Three Green Bonnets", "Forgive Me Lord", "Round the Bend of the Road", "Ave Maria" and "The Lord's Prayer". In 1975, her album The Golden Years reached No. 48 in the UK Albums Chart.

In 1978, she opened the Gracie Fields Theatre, near Oulder Hill Leadership Academy in her native Rochdale, performing a concert there recorded by the BBC to open the show. Fields appeared in ten Royal Variety Performances from 1928 onwards, her last being in 1978 at the age of 80, when she appeared as a surprise guest in the finale and sang her theme song, "Sally".

Her final TV appearance came in January 1979 when she appeared in a special octogenarian edition of The Merv Griffin Show in America, in which she sang the song she popularised in America, "The Biggest Aspidistra in the World". Fields was notified by her confidant John Taylor, while she was in America, that she had received the Queen's invitation to become a Dame Commander of the Order of the British Empire (in the 1979 New Years Honours List), to which she replied: "Yes I'll accept, yes I can kneel – but I might need help getting back up, and yes I'll attend – as long as they don't call Boris 'Buttons'." Seven months before her death in 1979, she was invested as a Dame Commander of the Order of the British Empire (DBE) by Queen Elizabeth II.

=== Death ===
Fields's health declined in July 1979, when she contracted pneumonia after performing an open-air concert on the Royal Yacht, which was docked in Capri's harbour. After a spell in hospital, she seemed to be recovering, but died on 27 September 1979, aged 81. The press reported she died holding her husband's hand, but in reality he was repairing the heating system in a different part of their Anacapri home at the time, while Gracie was in the 'Pink Apartment' with the housekeeper, Irena. Fields was buried in Capri's Protestant Cemetery, in a white marble tomb. Her coffin was carried by staff from her restaurant.

== Honours ==
Honours

Fields was appointed Commander of the Order of the British Empire in the 1938 New Years Honours. In February 1979, she was invested as a Dame Commander of the Order of the British Empire seven months before her death at her home on Capri, aged 81.

== In popular culture ==
Fields was the mystery guest on the 1 May 1955 edition of What's My Line? After Bennett Cerf asked about one of her songs, Dorothy Kilgallen correctly guessed it was her. Fields was granted the Freedom of Rochdale.

In early 1985, an episode of the BBC television series Halls of Fame, which presented a nostalgic look at various famous regional theatres, included a medley of Fields' songs at the Palace Theatre, Manchester, sung by Marti Webb. At the 1985 Royal Variety Performance, Su Pollard performed "Sally" in tribute to her. The following year's Performance also featured a section with a medley of Fields' songs, again sung by Webb.

Following her death, Fields was referenced in the 1987 film Wish You Were Here, the 1996 film Intimate Relations, and the 2006 film The History Boys.

Gracie! was a 2009 biopic TV film on her life, with Jane Horrocks playing Fields and Tom Hollander her husband Monty Banks. It covers Fields' career before the Second World War and the decline in her popularity during the war.

Other honours

Fields had two ships named after her. On 8 April 1936, Fields herself launched the PS Gracie Fields which was the last paddle steamer built for Red Funnel as a ferry and excursion steamer. She ran on the Southampton-Cowes route until the outbreak of World War II, when she was requisitioned and served as a minesweeper as HMS Gracie Fields. She was seriously damaged by aircraft bomb during the evacuation of Dunkirk and sank in 1940. In 1936, a passenger ship was also named the Gracie Fields.

Three oil paintings of Fields are held by Touchstones Gallery, Rochdale: in 1938, a painting by Herbert James Gunn, in 1978, a painting by William Allan Vause, and in 1998, a painting by Keith John Turley.

The local theatre in Rochdale, the Gracie Fields Theatre, was opened by, and named after, her in 1978.

On 3 October 2009, the final train to run on the Oldham Loop before it closed to be converted to a Manchester Metrolink tramway, a Class 156, was named in her honour.

In September 2016, a statue of Fields, created by Sean Hedges-Quinn, was unveiled outside Rochdale Town Hall, which was the first statue of a woman to be erected for over a century in Lancashire.

== Notable songs ==
- "We're All Living at the Cloisters"
- "You Didn't Want Me When You Had Me"
- "Sally"
- "The Kerry Dance"
- "Sing As We Go"
- "Thing-Ummy-Bob (That's Gonna Win The War)"
- "The Biggest Aspidistra in the World"
- "Three Green Bonnets"
- "I Took My Harp to a Party"
- "The Trek Song"
- "Pedro the Fisherman"
- "Only a Glass of Champagne"
- "Speak Softly, Love"
- "Angels Guard Thee"
- "Around the World"
- "Nuns' Chorus"
- "Little Donkey"
- "Now Is the Hour"
- "The Carefree Heart"
- "The Isle of Capri"
- "What Can You Give a Nudist On His Birthday?"
- "The Woodpecker Song"
- "Walter, Walter (Lead Me to the Altar)"
- "Young at Heart"
- "Christopher Robin is Saying His Prayers"
- "Far Away"
- "If I Had a Talking Picture of You"
- "Home"
- "Wish Me Luck as You Wave Me Goodbye"
- "The Holy City"
- "When I Grow Too Old to Dream"
- "If I Knew You Were Comin' I'd've Baked a Cake"
- "The Twelfth of Never"
- "Those Were The Days" (performed live at The Batley Variety Club in 1968)
- "Singin' in the Bathtub"
- "Stop and Shop at the Co-op Shop"
- "I Never Cried So Much in All My Life"
- "Take Me to Your Heart" (alternative English lyrics to "La Vie en rose")

== Filmography ==
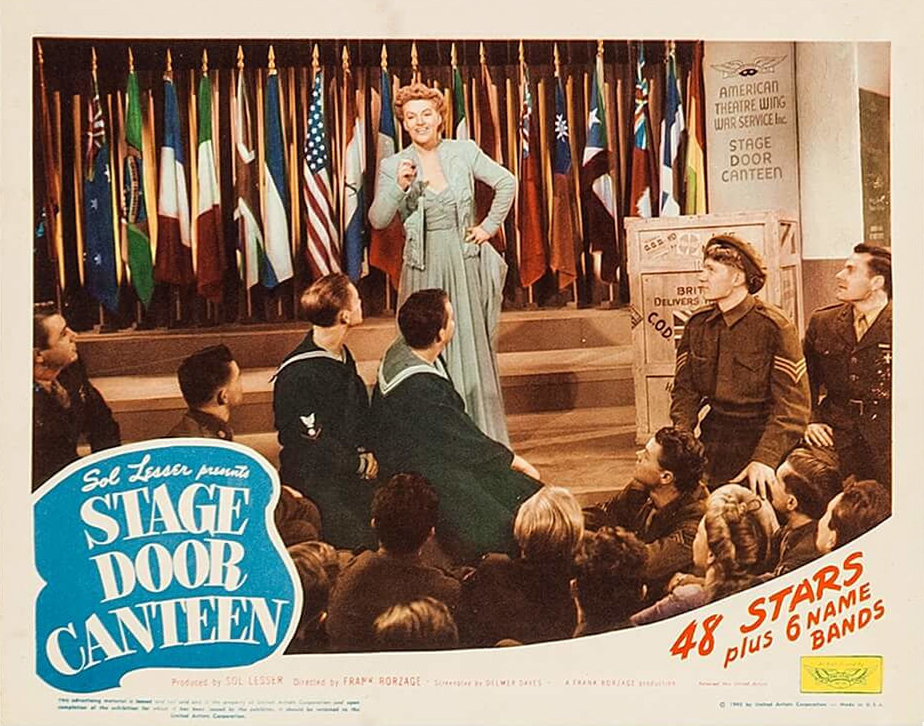
Gracie Fields in Stage Door Canteen (1943)

Year	Title	Role
1931	Sally in Our Alley	Sally Winch
1932	Looking on the Bright Side	Gracie
1933	This Week of Grace	Grace Milroy
1934	Love, Life and Laughter	Nellie Gwynn
1934	Sing As We Go	Gracie Platt
1935	Look Up and Laugh	Gracie Pearson
1936	Queen of Hearts	Grace Perkins
1937	The Show Goes On	Sally Scowcroft
1938	We're Going to Be Rich	Kit Dobson
1938	Young and Beautiful (short)	Herself
1938	Keep Smiling	Gracie Gray
1939	Shipyard Sally	Sally Fitzgerald
1943	Stage Door Canteen	Herself
1943	Holy Matrimony	Alice Chalice
1945	Molly and Me	Molly Barry
1945	Paris Underground	Emmeline Quayle

=== Box office ranking ===
For a number of years, British film exhibitors voted her among the top ten stars in Britain at the box office via an annual poll in the Motion Picture Herald.

- 1936 – 1st (3rd most popular star over all)
- 1937 – 1st (3rd overall)
- 1938 – 2nd
- 1939 - 2nd
- 1940 - 3rd
- 1941 - 8th
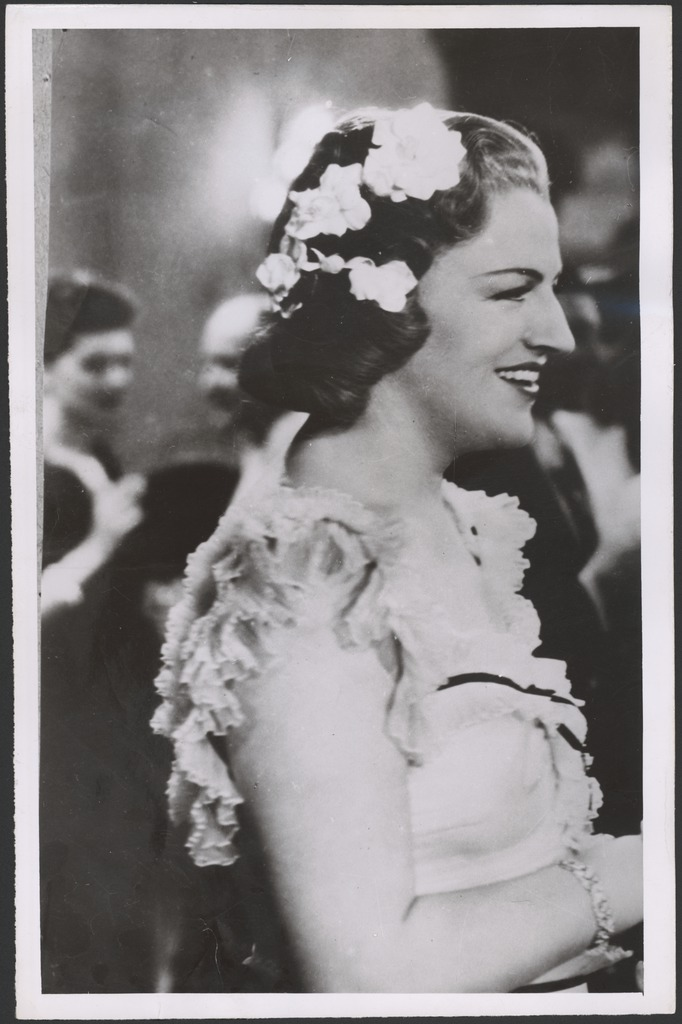
Portrait of Gracie Fields with flowers in her hair, 194-?

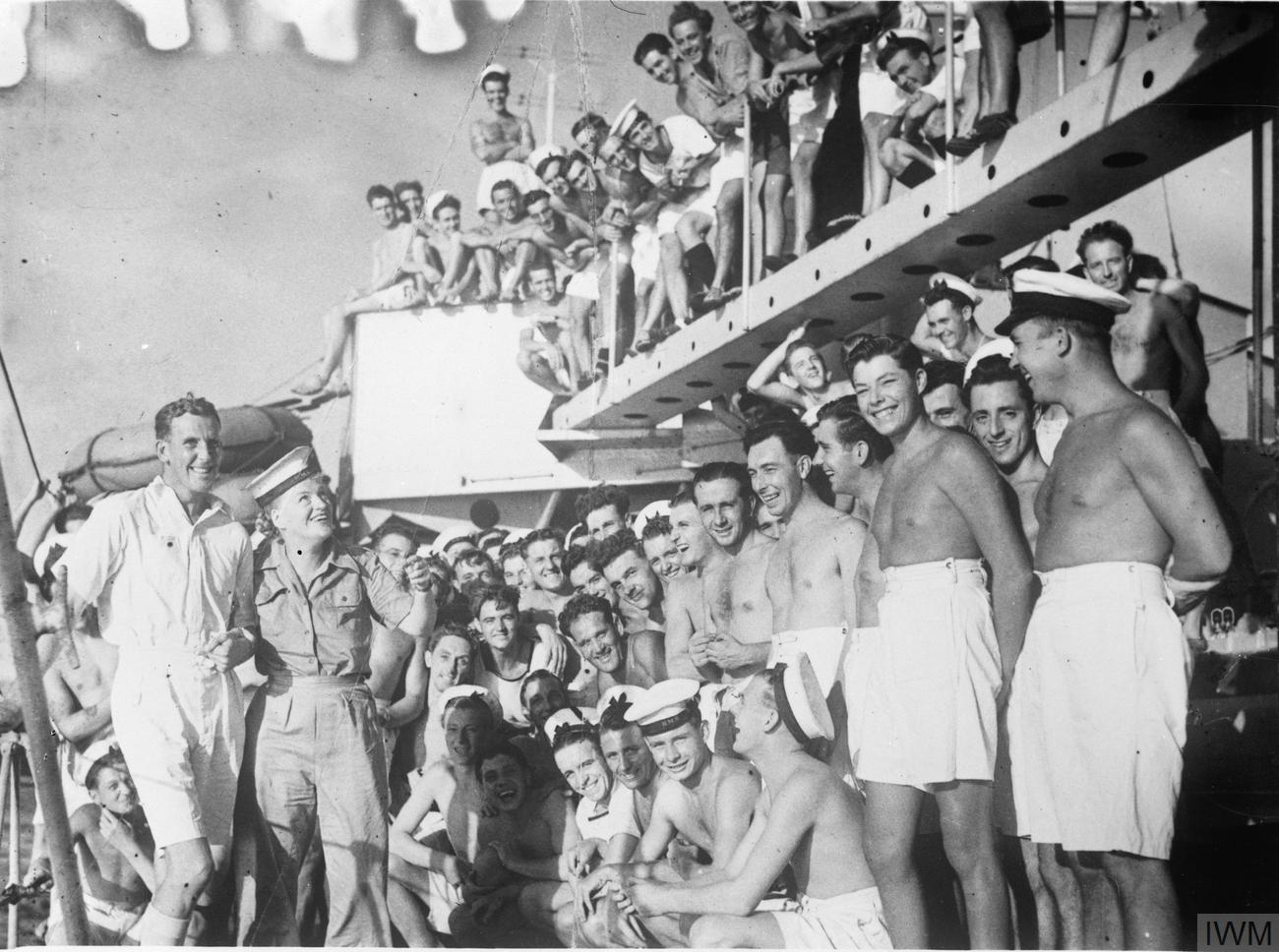
Gracie Fields with the British East Indies Fleet, Trincomalee, Ceylon, 20th of October 1945.

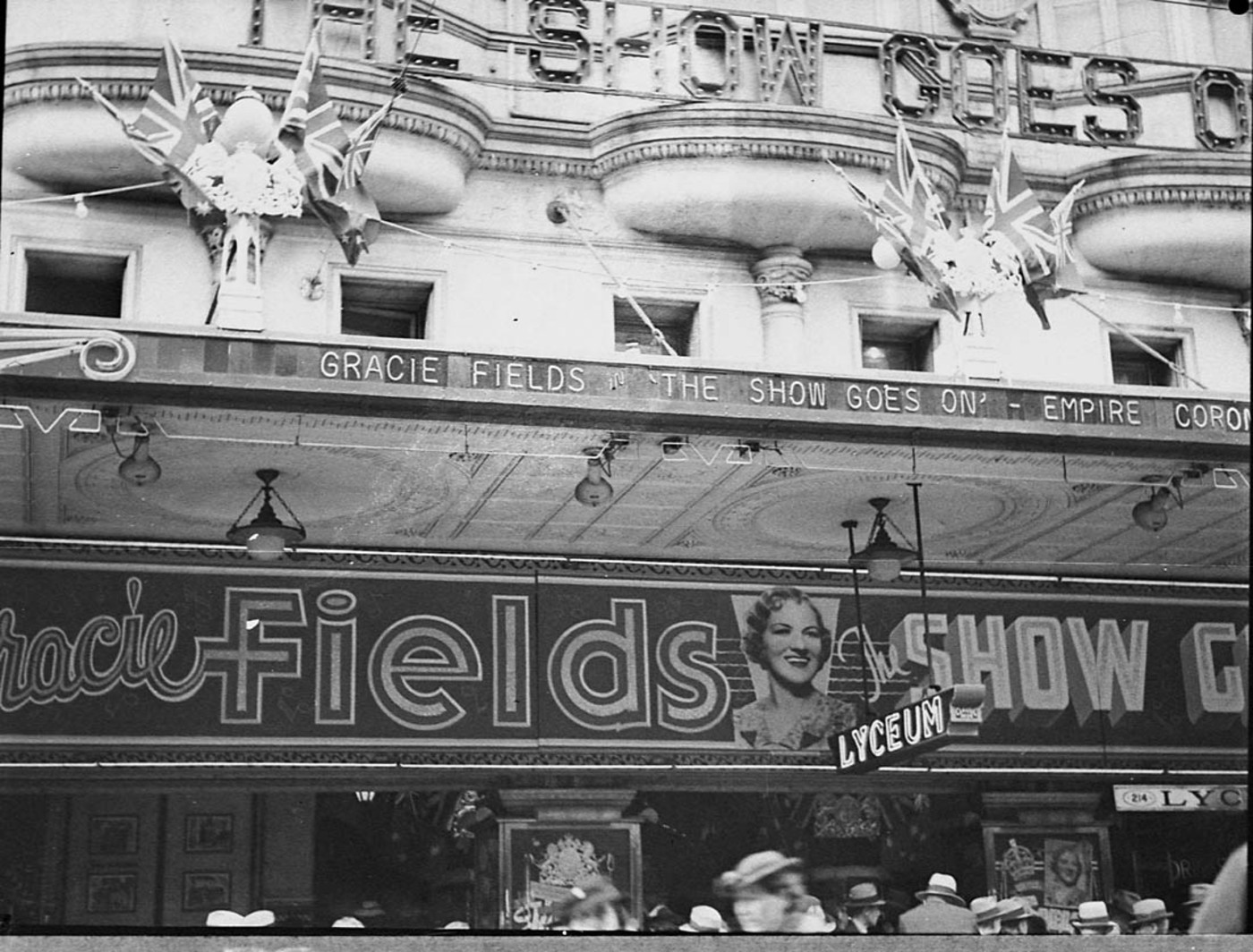
Queue at Lyceum Theatre for a Gracie Fields film, taken for British Empire Films.

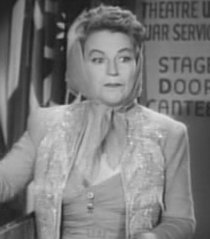
Gracie Fields, still from The Stage Door Canteen.

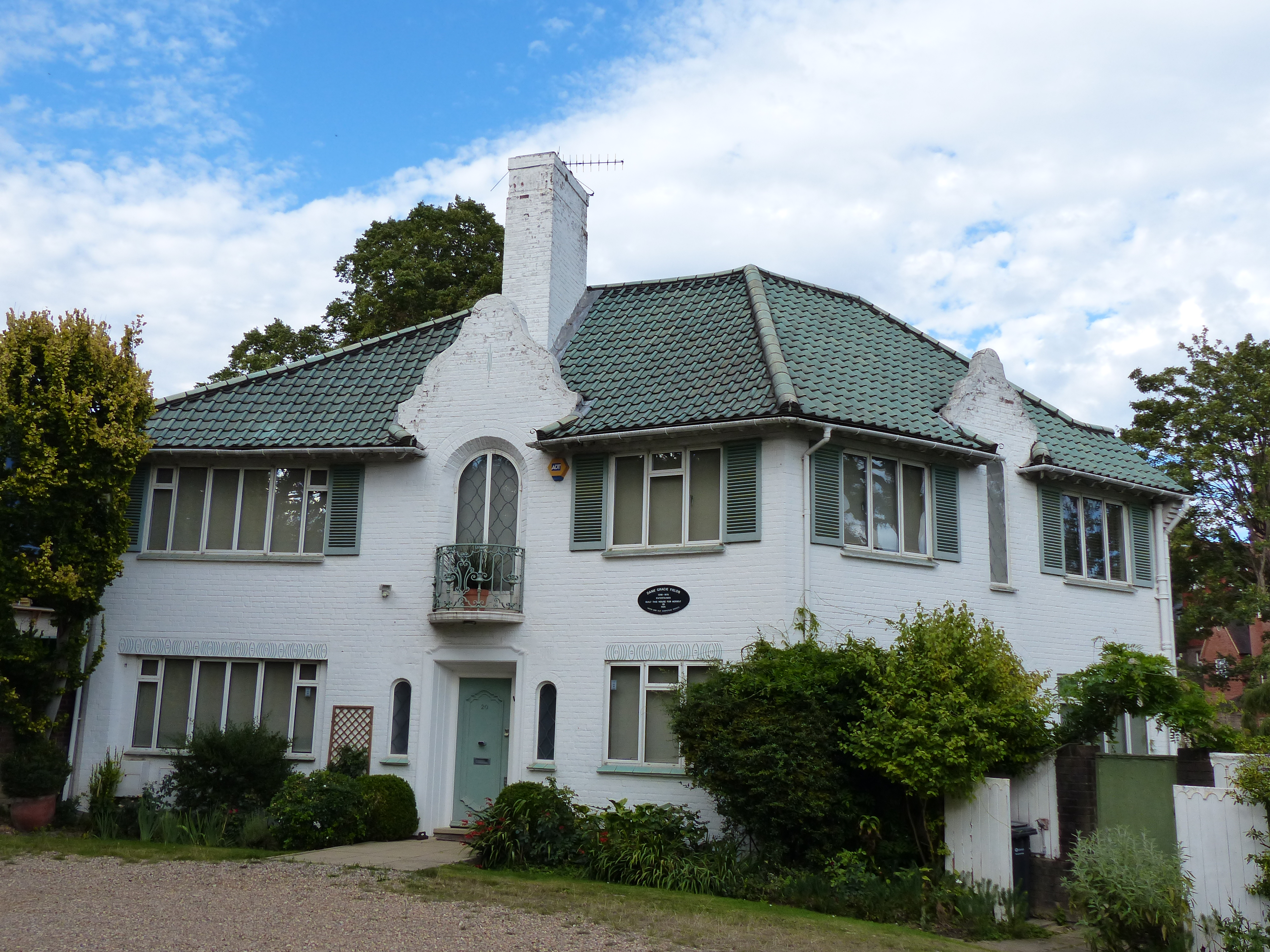
Dame Gracie Fields house.

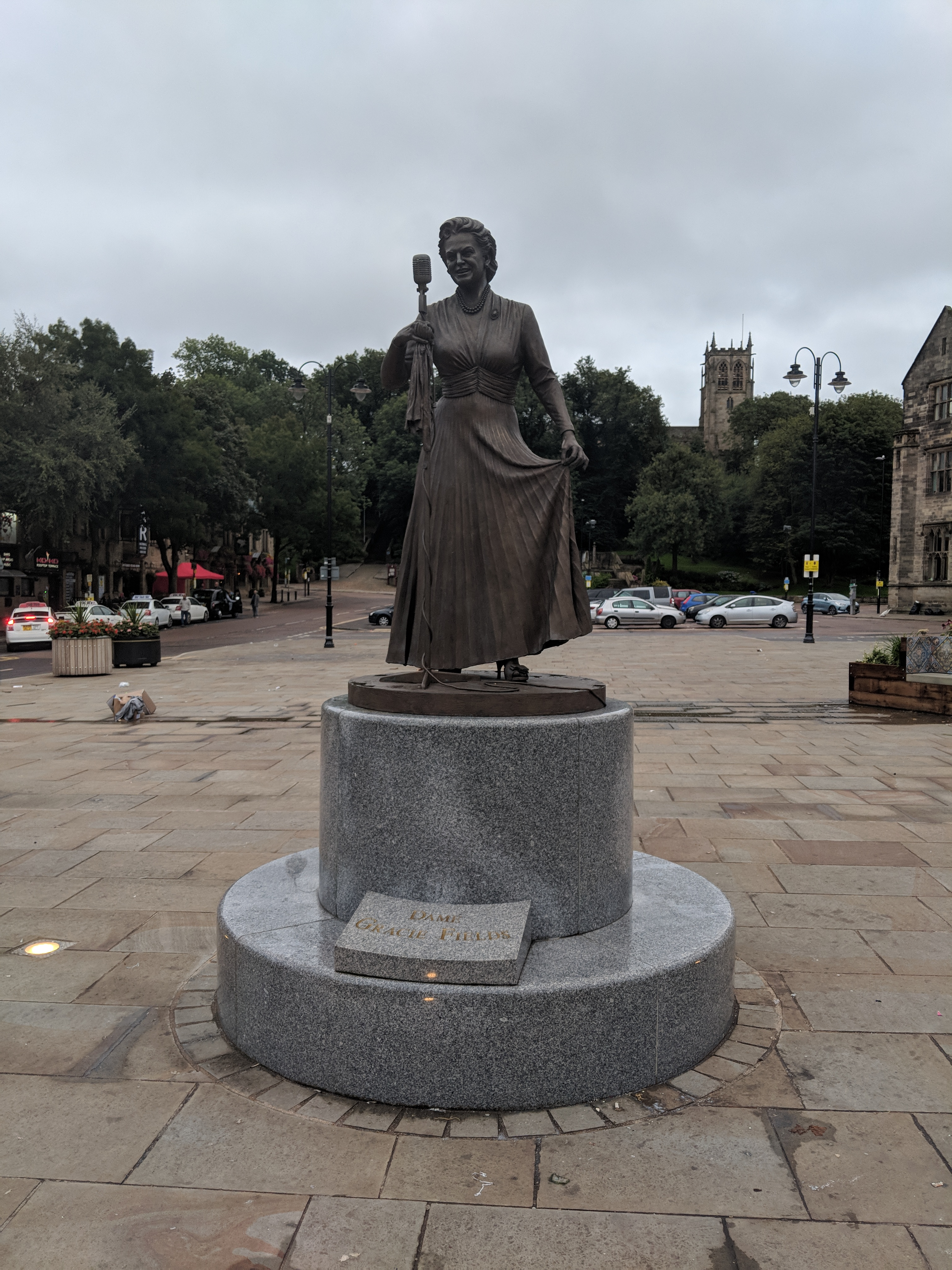
Statue of Dame Gracie Fields in Rochdale, Lancashire, England.

== Sources ==
- Fields, Gracie (1960). Sing As We Go. London: Frederick Muller Limited. pp. 1–228. ISBN 1245763555.
- Lassandro, Sebastian (2019). Pride of Our Alley, vol 1 and 2. Bear Manor Media.
- Lassandro, Sebastian (2020). Gracie's War. Independently published.
- Gracie Fields: The Authorised Biography (1995) by David Bret
- "Gracie Fields" by Jeffrey Richards in the Oxford Dictionary of National Biography
