= Albert Goozee =

British criminal

Albert William Goozee
- Born: 8 September 1923; London, England
- Died: 25 November 2009 (aged 86); Wigston, Leicester, England
- Convictions: Murder (6 December 1956); Wounding (2 November 1982); Two counts of Indecent assault (13 December 1996)
- Penalty: Death by hanging (reprieved 26 January 1957, commuted to life imprisonment); 18 months imprisonment 6 years' imprisonment

Albert William Goozee (8 September 1923 – 25 November 2009) was a British murderer and paedophile, whose crimes inspired the 1996 film Intimate Relations. In June 1956, Goozee murdered his 53-year-old landlady, Mrs. Lydia Leakey, and her 14-year-old daughter, Norma Noreen Leakey, in the New Forest, Hampshire. Sentenced at the Hampshire Assizes, Winchester, to death by hanging on 26 November 1956, Goozee was given a reprieve four days before his execution was due to take place and was instead detained at Broadmoor high-security psychiatric hospital. Released in 1971, Goozee, who had been diagnosed with paranoid schizophrenia, was subsequently convicted of several further violent crimes, and in 1996 was convicted of indecently assaulting two girls, aged 12 and 13. Sentencing, Mr. Justice Gower said one of the two cases had been "one of the most serious cases of indecent assault that I have ever had to deal with".

In October 2009, Goozee again became the subject of media interest when it was discovered that he had been released on compassionate grounds into the care of a nursing home for the elderly in Wigston, Leicester. While there, Goozee began a hunger strike and refused all food and medication. After developing a blood clot in his heart and complications from diabetes, he died on 25 November 2009. The coroner recorded a verdict of death by natural causes.

== Murders ==
In January 1955, 31-year-old Goozee, who had served as a merchant seaman, became a lodger at 5 Alexandra Road, Parkstone, Dorset. His landlady was 51-year-old Lydia Margaretta "Greta" Leakey, who lived there with her disabled husband, Thomas Vincent Leakey, and their 12-year-old daughter, Norma Noreen. Mr. Leakey, who had had one of his legs amputated during World War II, was described in court as living almost a separate life from his wife and the two slept in separate bedrooms. Within a few weeks of moving in, Goozee had started an affair with Mrs. Leakey. At his trial, Goozee claimed that he was seduced by the daughter and had conducted an affair with her also. Having apparently discovered the affair between Goozee and his wife, Mr. Leakey left the home for a while, but in early June 1956 returned and demanded that Goozee leave. Goozee moved out and took up lodgings on Sunnyhill Road, Parkstone.

On 17 June 1956, Goozee took Lydia Leakey and her daughter out for a picnic at Bignell Wood near Cadnam in the New Forest, using the Wolseley car she had purchased for him. Goozee was later found by the side of the road bleeding from a stab wound to his abdomen. A short distance away police found the bodies of Lydia and Norma Leakey. Lydia had died from a fractured skull and multiple stab wounds, while her daughter was killed by a single stab wound which had penetrated her heart. Post-mortem examination revealed that Norma had also been indecently assaulted. The murder weapon, a double-edged Fairbairn–Sykes fighting knife with a 7-inch blade, was found concealed in Goozee's car. Goozee's injury was later determined to be self-inflicted.

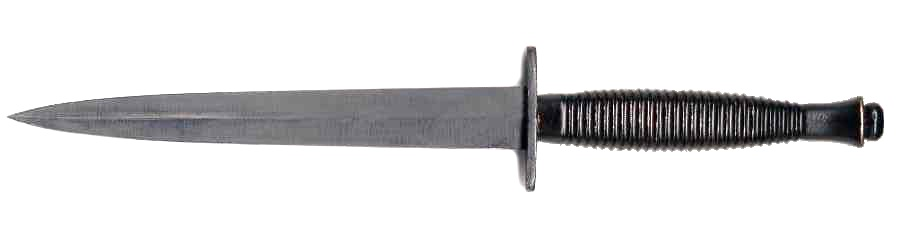
A Fairbairn-Sykes fighting knife, issued to British Commandos, of the same type as the murder weapon.

Goozee was treated at the Royal South Hampshire Hospital where he was held under police guard. On 19 June 1956, he was charged with indecently assaulting Norma Leakey and after being discharged from the hospital on 25 June 1956 he was charged with both murders. When the case came to trial the prosecution, led by Norman Roy Fox-Andrews Q.C., elected to proceed on the charge of Norma's murder only, with the murder of Mrs. Leakey to remain on file. The trial took place in Winchester, Hampshire. After deliberation, the jury of seven men and five women returned a verdict of guilty as charged, and on 6 December 1956 the judge, Mr. Justice Havers, sentenced Goozee to death by hanging. Goozee appealed against the conviction, and the appeal was heard by Baron Goddard, the Lord Chief Justice, Mr. Justice Cassels and Mr. Justice Lynskey, who dismissed it on 14 January 1957. Despite the dismissal of the appeal, Rab Butler, the Home Secretary, recommended Goozee be reprieved on 25 January 1957, four days before he was due to be executed, on grounds that he had been "provoked beyond reason", and the sentence commuted to life imprisonment. Goozee was transferred to Broadmoor, a secure psychiatric hospital, where he was held until released on licence in 1971, aged 48.

== Subsequent offences ==
On his release from Broadmoor in 1971, Goozee relocated to Hawksmoor Road, Stafford, Staffordshire, and took up employment at the nearby General Electric Company works. In 1973, he was imprisoned for theft and "going equipped for theft". In 1977, he was dismissed by GEC when fellow workers, who had learned his identity in 1975, refused to work with him because of his previous conviction and his aggressive behaviour. Around this time he was imprisoned for possession of an offensive weapon after threatening a police officer with an iron bar. In 1982, by which time he had moved to Stonydelph, Tamworth, Staffordshire, Goozee was convicted of wounding a neighbour after stabbing him with a Stanley knife, and was sentenced at Stafford Crown Court to 18 months imprisonment and recalled to his life sentence. In 1985, he supported a campaign for the return of capital punishment and "volunteered to meet the hangman to take the punishment originally prescribed for him for the murders of 1956".

Goozee was released again in 1993, aged 70, and relocated to Chatham, Kent where he was provided with sheltered housing. It was here, on 25 December 1995, that Goozee lured two girls aged 12 and 13 into his home where he gave them alcohol and then indecently assaulted them. The attacks came to light after the girls contacted ChildLine, a telephone counselling service for children provided by the NSPCC. Goozee was tried at Maidstone Crown Court in December 1996 where the jury cleared him of the rape of one of the girls but found him guilty of indecent assault. Mr. Justice Gower sentenced him to 6 years imprisonment and said that Goozee's "horrifying" record should be considered if it was felt he should be released in the future. Predating the newspaper's July 2000 campaign for Sarah's Law, the News of the World highlighted the case as an example of why the government should allow controlled access to the Sex Offenders Register, so parents with young children could know if a sex-offender was living in their area. One of the girls' mothers said: "He was put into the community by the authorities, and none of the parents around here knew that he was a child killer. When I found out what he had done in the past it made me feel physically sick. We could have been burying our kids instead of just trying to rebuild their lives after an horrific ordeal. I hope he rots." The second mother said: "We should have been told this 'sweet old man' was really a child murderer."

== Intimate Relations ==
In 1996, a black comedy film called Intimate Relations and based on Goozee's murders, was released. Starring Julie Walters and Rupert Graves, the film sympathetically portrayed Goozee as a "forlorn young man trapped in a love triangle". Lydia Leakey's surviving daughter Mary Margaret Hayward criticised the filmmakers for attempting to "make a star out of the man who had murdered her mother and sister".

== Release and death ==
In 2009, terminally ill Goozee was given a compassionate release and was moved into Cedar Court nursing home in Wigston, Leicester, where he died on 25 November 2009 after refusing food and medication. Recording a verdict of death by natural causes, coroner Catherine Mason said: "As a dying man, his needs were recognised so much that he was granted compassionate release. He was permitted to die with dignity in an appropriate setting."
