= Aspidistra alata =

Scientific classification
- Kingdom: Plantae
- Clade: Embryophytes
- Clade: Tracheophytes
- Clade: Spermatophytes
- Clade: Angiosperms
- Clade: Monocots
- Order: Asparagales
- Family: Asparagaceae
- Subfamily: Convallarioideae
- Genus: Aspidistra
- Species: A. alata

Binomial name
- Aspidistra alata Tillich, Averyanov & Dzu, 2007

Species of flowering plant

Aspidistra alata is a species of flowering plant. A. alata grows in evergreen and semideciduous forests on slopes of limestone mountains in Vietnam. Its name is derived from the Latin alatus, meaning "winged", referring to its thin keels on perigone lobes.

== Description ==
This species is a perennial herb. Its rhizome is creeping, with a diameter of between 5 and 6 millimetres (0.20 and 0.24 in), which is densely covered with fibrous remnants of cataphylls. Its leaves are distally huddled, each being between 80 and 100 centimetres (31 and 39 in) long; the petiole measuring between 15 and 20 centimetres (5.9 and 7.9 in). Its lamina is linear, measuring between 60 and 80 centimetres (24 and 31 in) by 2.5 to 3.5 centimetres (0.98 to 1.38 in), and basally gradually tapers towards the petiole.

Flowers are found solitary, with a decumbent peduncle, 5 to 7 centimetres (2.0 to 2.8 in) in size, showing two bracts halfway and one at its base. The perigone is greenish-violet to reddish; the flower's tube is urceolate, 8 to 10 millimetres (0.31 to 0.39 in) long. It counts with 6 lobes, which are ligulate with rounded and reflexed tips, 8 by 4 millimetres (0.31 by 0.16 in), each with 4 thin, parallel keels which fuse with each other and basally run to the base of the tube. Its anthers amount to 6, which are sessile and ovoid, measuring 1.2 by 0.8 millimetres (0.047 by 0.031 in), and are closely attached to the pistil base. The latter is mushroom-shaped, while the ovary is inconspicuous, with a cylindrical style with a length of 2 millimetres (0.079 in), and a hemispherical stigma with a diameter of 5 millimetres (0.20 in), the upper surface of which shows irregular furrows similar to cerebral sulci.

== Distribution ==
Aspidistra alata is known from three places in Cao Bằng Province, being adjacent to the Guangxi (China). It also occurs in Guangxi, the same way some Aspidistra species found in southern Guangxi sometimes venture to Cao Bằng.
