= Aspidistra nikolaii =

Scientific classification
- Kingdom: Plantae
- Clade: Tracheophytes
- Clade: Angiosperms
- Clade: Monocots
- Order: Asparagales
- Family: Asparagaceae
- Subfamily: Nolinoideae
- Genus: Aspidistra
- Species: A. nikolaii

Binomial name
- Aspidistra nikolaii Aver. & Tillich

Species of flowering plant

Aspidistra nikolaii is a plant species of the genus Aspidistra that was one of the new 21 species of plants and animals recently discovered in the Annamite Range of central Vietnam. It was named after a late Russian botanist named Nicolai Arnautov. It has a dark blue flower that is almost black.
