= Aspidistra letreae =

Scientific classification
- Kingdom: Plantae
- Clade: Embryophytes
- Clade: Tracheophytes
- Clade: Spermatophytes
- Clade: Angiosperms
- Clade: Monocots
- Order: Asparagales
- Family: Asparagaceae
- Subfamily: Convallarioideae
- Genus: Aspidistra
- Species: A. letreae

Binomial name
- Aspidistra letreae Aver, Tillich & Lê

Species of plant

Aspidistra letreae (Vietnamese: Tỏi đá lê trễ) is a species of flowering plant that belonging to the genus Aspidistra a species endemic to Vietnam and first seen in Vinh Linh, Quang Tri. This species is named for the teacher, Dr. Le Thi Tre from Hue University, who is also the teacher of the third author, Le Anh Tuan.

== Toxin ==
A publication in Hue University Science Magazine shows that a steroid saponin of this species, Aspiletrein A, has effects on non-small lung cancer cell.
