= Aspidistra yingjiangensis =

Scientific classification
- Kingdom: Plantae
- Clade: Tracheophytes
- Clade: Angiosperms
- Clade: Monocots
- Order: Asparagales
- Family: Asparagaceae
- Subfamily: Nolinoideae
- Genus: Aspidistra
- Species: A. yingjiangensis

Binomial name
- Aspidistra yingjiangensis L.J.Peng

Species of flowering plant

Aspidistra yingjiangensis is a species of Aspidistra that is found in India. The plant's leaves are green with pale yellow spots that are narrowly oblanceolate and it has two or three bracts. The flowers are individual or paired.

== See also ==
- Flora of India
