= Aspidistra campanulata =

Scientific classification
- Kingdom: Plantae
- Clade: Embryophytes
- Clade: Tracheophytes
- Clade: Spermatophytes
- Clade: Angiosperms
- Clade: Monocots
- Order: Asparagales
- Family: Asparagaceae
- Subfamily: Convallarioideae
- Genus: Aspidistra
- Species: A. campanulata

Binomial name
- Aspidistra campanulata Tillich, Averyanov & Dzu, 2007

Species of flowering plant

Aspidistra campanulata is a species of flowering plant. A. campanulata grows in evergreen forests on very steep slopes of eroded limestone mountains in Vietnam. Its name is due to the bell shape of its perigone.

== Description ==
This species is a perennial herb. Its rhizome is creeping, with a diameter of between 3 and 4 millimetres (0.12 and 0.16 in). Its leaves are 5 to 10 millimetres (0.20 to 0.39 in) apart, the petiole measuring about 7 centimetres (2.8 in), being gracile; the lamina is ovate and tapers towards a long tip, measuring between 13 and 15 centimetres (5.1 and 5.9 in) by 3.5 to 5 centimetres (1.4 to 2.0 in).

Flowers are found solitary, with an upright, thin and stiff peduncle, 4 to 6.5 centimetres (1.6 to 2.6 in) in size, showing two bracts basally and one next to the flower. Flowers are positioned slantedly upright or horizontally, and are pleasantly fragranced. The perigone is campanulate and white; the flower's tube is 10 millimetres (0.39 in) long and wide. It counts with 6 narrow, triangular lobes with rounded tips, 10 millimetres (0.39 in) long and between 2.5 and 3 millimetres (0.098 and 0.118 in) wide at their base. These lobes don't possess keels, however they do show 3 nerves running down to the tube base, as well as a side vein fusing with that of the adjacent lobe. It counts with 6 stamens at the base of the tube, surrounding the style, the filaments of which measure 1 to 1.5 millimetres (0.039 to 0.059 in). Its anthers are lineate, measuring 2.5 by 0.5 millimetres (0.098 by 0.020 in); the pistil is slender and the ovar is inconspicuous. The style is 8 millimetres (0.31 in) long, while the stigma is widened and measures 1 to 1.2 millimetres (0.039 to 0.047 in) in diameter.

== Distribution ==
Aspidistra campanulata is known only from its type locality, in Na Hang district, Tuyên Quang province, Vietnam.
