= Theatretrain =

Performing Arts Theatre

Theatretrain is a performing arts organisation founded by the teacher/director Kevin Dowsett in 1992. It gives part-time training in drama, dance and singing to children and young people aged between 6 and 18 years of age. Since 1993, it has grown into one of the largest professional performing arts training organisations in the United Kingdom. By 2014, there were over 70 centres across the UK.

== History ==
Theatretrain was founded by Kevin Dowsett who spent fourteen years as a head of drama and GCSE examiner in schools in the West Midlands and London. He went on to become the theatre tutor at the ILEA's Curtain Theatre where he created a variety of theatre training programmes and established the respected Curtain Youth Theatre. Later, he taught acting extensively in drama schools including Rose Bruford College, East 15 Acting School, Academy of Live and Recorded Arts and the Italia Conti Academy of Theatre Arts where he was head of acting. He also taught advanced acting process (a course for professional actors) for six years at the City Lit in London.

When his job disappeared in government cutbacks in the early 1990s, Dowsett used his extensive experience of education and theatre to create a new approach for training young people in the performing arts. He realised that much performing arts training was based on an examination system conducted through classes. He wanted to make it more creative and closer to a theatre experience rather than school. He devised a system that allowed each young person to perform live theatre to the highest possible standard and where possible to incorporate their own ideas.

Almost immediately the company began to expand and franchises were established across the country. Each centre is managed by a centre director and a creative team that includes teachers of drama, dance and singing who also have the skills of direction, choreography or musical direction.

From the beginning, Dowsett worked with the musical director and composer Robert Hyman and together they created shows that grew in size with each passing year. Always using live music this partnership created shows that integrated all the performing arts into the performance. Since 1993, thousands of young people have appeared the stages of the UK's most famous theatres including The London Palladium, Theatre Royal Drury Lane, the Dominion Theatre, Her Majesty's Theatre and the Royal Albert Hall. Theatretrain has become the UK's major provider of performing arts training that leads to performance.

In 2009, the artistic team created a project called The Long and Winding Road with 5000 schoolchildren who performed the story of The Beatles at The O2 Arena. The special guest was Bill Bailey. In 2010, another 5,000 young people performed Licence to Thrill, a spectacular spoof of James Bond. The special guest this time was Blue Peter's Andy Akinwolere.

In 2010, at the Royal Albert Hall, 1,000 Theatretrain pupils created the most ambitious performance to date. Voices for a Better World told the story of a tribe who had to go to war to learn the value of peace. On this occasion they were joined by 120 young people from 26 different countries who rehearsed in London for 10 days. This performance was the inaugural performance of the World Children's Theatre Ensemble.

On 14 July 2013, 3,500 pupils and teachers performed 20@O2, at the O2 Arena in London. This 21st birthday show paid tribute to 20 years of large scale performance.

Since 1993, Theatretrain has taken work abroad to festivals and encounters meeting children and young people from all over the world. Theatretrain has twice represented the UK at the World Festival of Children's Theatre, in 1994 and 2007.

Many pupils have gone on to higher education and become professional performers or work in the performing arts industry. Many ex-pupils, including the singer Sam Smith, have gone on to higher education and become professional creatives in the performing arts industry.

Theatretrain has performed in many countries around the world such as in New York, USA, and in 2015 and 2016 Theatretrain students performed in the Disneyland Paris pre-parade.

In September 2017, Theatretrain celebrated its 25th birthday with a special show at The Royal Albert Hall in London titled 25 Years – A Celebration!.

Since 2012, Theatretrain has supported the Theodora Children's Charity who provide Giggle Doctors to children's hospitals, hospices and specialist care centres across the UK. In November 2018, in a one-day event, they raised £62,738.92 for the charity.

As the worldwide Coronavirus entered the UK in 2020, the company created within days, on-line offer. This included Zoom classes for most pupils, social media activities including masterclasses and live events. The interconnected nature of the company meant that many local and national projects were created that brought the company together on-line. A highlight was the August 2020 Festival – Theatretrain in Mind. The company moved with the times and made even more prominent, life skills as part of the theatre process.

In July 2022 the company celebrated its 30th Birthday by performing a set at the annual Summer by the River Festival at the Scoop by Tower Bridge. In September 2023 the company performed its 100th large-scale production at the Royal Albert Hall. Such was the demand for tickets that it added a 101st show. The show was called “We’re Gonna Change the World.” 1400 young performers asked the question what is wrong with the world and what could we do to fix it?

== Patrons ==
Theatretrain has support from several well-known actors.

- Sir Derek Jacobi
- Alfred Molina
- Catherine Tate
- Lucy Davis
- Simon Lipkin

== Performances ==
Year	Show	Venue
1993	Louder Than Words	Bloomsbury Theatre
1994	The Power Of Love	Bloomsbury Theatre
1994	Senses	Towngate Theatre
1995	Rhythm and Hues	Brentwood Centre
1995	From a Distance	Towngate Theatre and Hackney Empire
1996	On the Stage	Bloomsbury Theatre
1997	The Long and Winding Road	Theatre Royal, Drury Lane
1998	Food and Drink	Bloomsbury Theatre
1999	Songs of the Century	London Palladium
2000	Heroes	Her Majesty's Theatre and Lyceum Theatre
2001	Life and Soul! The Game Show!	Theatre Royal, Drury Lane and Her Majesty's Theatre
2001	Calling All Stations	Her Majesty's Theatre
2002	Let's Dance	Theatre Royal, Drury Lane
2002	Protest	The Old Vic
2002	Calling All Stations	Her Majesty's Theatre
2003	The Motown Show	Palace Theatre, Manchester, Theatre Royal, Drury Lane and Dominion Theatre
2004	Songs of the Century	Royal Albert Hall
2004	The Long and Winding Road	Dominion Theatre and Palace Theatre, Manchester
2005	Licence to Thrill	Theatre Royal, Drury Lane
2005	Step Into Christmas	Apollo Victoria Theatre
2005	Bash The Bard	Her Majesty's Theatre
2006	Licence to Thrill	Theatre Royal, Drury Lane and Palace Theatre, Manchester
2006	The Petticoat Rebellion	Shaftesbury Theatre
2006	Songs of the Century	Royal Albert Hall
2007	Wondrous Stories	London Palladium
2007	The Long and Winding Road	Royal Albert Hall
2008	Wondrous Stories	London Palladium
2008	I Don't Feel Like Dancing!	Royal Albert Hall
2009	Rhythm and Blues	London Palladium, Palace Theatre, Manchester and Sadler's Wells Theatre
2009	Step Into Christmas	Theatre Royal, Drury Lane
2010	Rhythm and Blues	London Palladium and Sadler's Wells Theatre
2010	Voices For a Better World performed by the World's Children's Theatre Ensemble	Royal Albert Hall
2010	Licence to Thrill	The O2 Arena
2011	A Spark to a Flame	Tolpuddle Martyrs festival
2011	I Don't Feel Like Dancing!	Royal Albert Hall
2012	Now Then	Sadler's Wells Theatre and The Scoop
2012	Licence to Thrill	Royal Albert Hall
2013	20@O2	The O2 Arena
2014	Now Then	The London Palladium
2014	Step into Christmas	The Adelphi Theatre
2015	Now Then	Theatre Royal Drury Lane
2015	How to Make a Hero	Royal Albert Hall
2016	How to Make a Hero	Royal Albert Hall
2017	25 Years – A Celebration	Royal Albert Hall
2018	Special Measures	Nottingham Concert Hall and Sadler's Wells
2019	Move!	Royal Albert Hall
2023	We're Gonna Change The World	Royal Albert Hall
2024	Once Upon a Time	Sadlers Wells
