= Belfry Witches =

- Genre: Family Television
- Directed by: Joy Perino
- Starring: Lucy Davis; Laura Sadler; Scott Charles; Paula Jacobs
- Theme music composer: Greg Morrison; Stuart Kershaw; Kirsten Morrison
- Country of origin: United Kingdom
- Original language: English
- No. of series: 2
- No. of episodes: 13

Production
- Running time: 25 minutes

Original release
- Network: BBC One
- Release: 29 September 1999 – 7 November 2000

Belfry Witches is a British television show broadcast by the BBC during its CBBC slot. It ran for just over a year, airing in September 1999 and running its thirteenth and final episode in November 2000.

The show followed two witches, Skirty Marm (Laura Sadler) and Old Noshie (Lucy Davis) as they caused mischief in a quiet English village named Tranter's End, which they fled to after being banished their home on Witch Island. The show revolved around the two witches, the friendly rector of the church whose belfry they are in, Chris Tucker (played by Scott Charles), the resident "naughty boy", a nasty woman named Mrs Bagg-Meanly (played by Paula Jacobs), and the Head Witch who banished Skirty Marm and Old Noshie - Mrs Abercrombie (Jan Harvey). The show was called 'Belfry Witches' because the two witches lived in a church belfry. The show was axed due to poor ratings.

The show was based on the children's book series by author and journalist Kate Saunders. It was never released either on video or DVD.

== Theme tune ==
The theme tune was performed by the all-female pop group Atomic Kitten and was called "Something Spooky". OMD member and Atomic Kitten co-founder, Stuart Kershaw, was among its writers. The song was released as a B-side on Atomic Kitten's 1999 single "Right Now".
