= Aspidistra recondita =

Scientific classification
- Kingdom: Plantae
- Clade: Embryophytes
- Clade: Tracheophytes
- Clade: Spermatophytes
- Clade: Angiosperms
- Clade: Monocots
- Order: Asparagales
- Family: Asparagaceae
- Subfamily: Convallarioideae
- Genus: Aspidistra
- Species: A. recondita

Binomial name
- Aspidistra recondita Tillich, Averyanov & Dzu, 2007

Species of flowering plant

Aspidistra recondita is a species of flowering plant. A. recondita takes its name from the Latin reconditus, meaning "hidden", referring to its sexual organs being completely hidden inside its ovoid perigone, with a small opening. Given it was described from an A. lurida specimen, neither its distribution nor habitat are known.

== Description ==
This species is a perennial herb. Its rhizome is creeping, and measures 5 to 6 millimetres (0.20 to 0.24 in) in diameter. Its leaves are 1 to 1.5 centimetres (0.39 to 0.59 in) apart, its strong petiole measuring about 25 to 30 centimetres (9.8 to 11.8 in); the lamina is ovate and asymmetrical, measuring about 30 by 6 centimetres (11.8 by 2.4 in), its base being cuneate, each side of which carries between 30 and 40 veins.

Its decumbent peduncle measures 2 to 3 centimetres (0.79 to 1.18 in) long, with 2 scales along its axis and 2 scales embracing the flower; its perigone is ovoid, measuring 12 by 9 to 10 millimetres (0.47 by 0.35 to 0.39 in), possessing no lobes. It counts with 6 stamens, while its anthers measure 3 by 1.5 millimetres (0.118 by 0.059 in) long; the pistil is mushroom-shaped, while the ovar is indistinct. Its style measures 2 millimetres (0.079 in) and the hemispherical stigma is 6 millimetres (0.24 in) wide and high.
