= Aspidistra umbrosa =

Scientific classification
- Kingdom: Plantae
- Clade: Embryophytes
- Clade: Tracheophytes
- Clade: Spermatophytes
- Clade: Angiosperms
- Clade: Monocots
- Order: Asparagales
- Family: Asparagaceae
- Subfamily: Convallarioideae
- Genus: Aspidistra
- Species: A. umbrosa

Binomial name
- Aspidistra umbrosa Tillich, Averyanov & Dzu, 2007

Species of flowering plant

Aspidistra umbrosa is a species of flowering plant. Given it was described from an unclassified Aspidistra specimen from another study, neither its distribution nor habitat are known.

== Description ==
This species is a perennial herb. Its rhizome is creeping, and measures 5 millimetres (0.20 in) in diameter. Its leaves are 1.5 to 2.5 centimetres (0.59 to 0.98 in) apart, its strong petiole measuring about 30 to 35 centimetres (12 to 14 in); the lamina is obovate and acuminate, measuring about 30 by 10 centimetres (11.8 by 3.9 in).

Its peduncle measures 0.2 to 0.5 centimetres (0.079 to 0.197 in) long; its perigone is campanulate and purple, measuring 15 millimetres (0.59 in) long and 7 millimetres (0.28 in) in diameter, possessing 6 lobes, each with 2 keels. It counts with 6 stamens, while its anthers are subsessile and linear, and measures 4.5 by 1.5 millimetres (0.177 by 0.059 in); the pistil is thin and 10 millimetres (0.39 in) long, while the ovar is inconspicuous. Its style distally widens towards the smooth stigma, which measures 3 millimetres (0.12 in) in diameter.
