= Aspidistra nutans =

Scientific classification
- Kingdom: Plantae
- Clade: Tracheophytes
- Clade: Angiosperms
- Clade: Monocots
- Order: Asparagales
- Family: Asparagaceae
- Subfamily: Convallarioideae
- Genus: Aspidistra
- Species: A. nutans

Binomial name
- Aspidistra nutans Aver. and Tillich

Species of plant

Aspidistra nutans is a flowering monocotyledonous plant in the genus Aspidistra, in the asparagus family, Asparagaceae.

== Distribution ==
The native range of Aspidistra nutans is from Yunnan province in China, to Northwestern Vietnam.
