= Aspidistra phongdiensis =

Scientific classification
- Kingdom: Plantae
- Clade: Tracheophytes
- Clade: Angiosperms
- Clade: Monocots
- Order: Asparagales
- Family: Asparagaceae
- Subfamily: Nolinoideae
- Genus: Aspidistra
- Species: A. phongdiensis

Binomial name
- Aspidistra phongdiensis D.Dien, T.A.Le & Vislobokov

Species of plant

Aspidistra phongdiensis (Vietnamese: Tỏi rừng Phong Điền or Tỏi đá Phong Điền) is a species of flowering plant in the genus Aspidistra. It is endemic to central Vietnam and was known from Phong Dien Nature Reserve, Hue.
