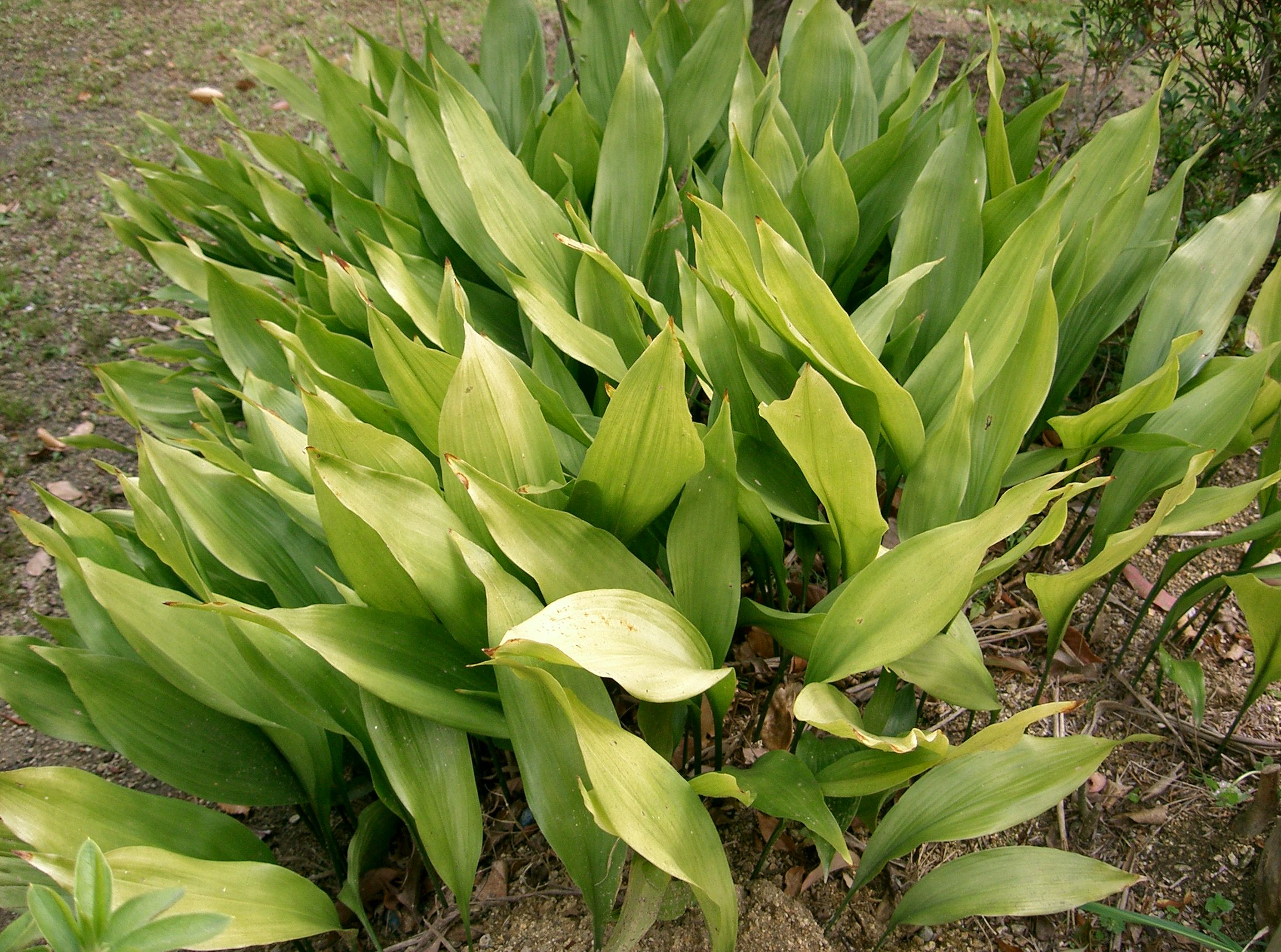
- Aspidistra elatior

Scientific classification
- Kingdom: Plantae
- Clade: Tracheophytes
- Clade: Angiosperms
- Clade: Monocots
- Order: Asparagales
- Family: Asparagaceae
- Subfamily: Convallarioideae
- Genus: Aspidistra; Ker Gawl.

Synonyms
- Antherolophus Gagnep.; Colania Gagnep.; Evrardiella Gagnep.; Macrogyne Link & Otto; Plectogyne Link; Porpax Salisb.

= Aspidistra =

Genus of flowering plants

Aspidistra /ˌæspɪˈdɪstrə/ is a genus of flowering plants in the family Asparagaceae, subfamily Convallarioideae, native to eastern and southeastern Asia, particularly China and Vietnam. They grow in shade under trees and shrubs. Their leaves arise more or less directly from ground level, where their flowers also appear. The number of species known has increased considerably from the 1980s onwards, with around 250 accepted as of October 2026. Aspidistra elatior is common worldwide as a foliage house plant that is very tolerant of neglect. It and other species can also be grown in shade outside, where they are generally hardy to −15 °C (5 °F).

== Description ==
Species of Aspidistra are perennial herbaceous plants growing from rhizomes. The leaves are either solitary or are grouped in small "tufts" of two to four. They arise more or less directly from the rhizome, rather than being borne on stems. Each leaf has a long stalk (petiole) and a blade with many veins. The flowering stem (scape) is usually very short so that the flowers appear low down among the leaves. The fleshy flowers are bell-, urn- or cup-shaped. They vary considerably in size and shape, although few are showy. The flowers of A. longipedunculata are yellow and, unusually for the genus, are borne on scapes up to 20 cm (8 in) high. A. grandiflora has spider-like flowers up to 12 cm (5 in) across. The flower has a large stigma with a flattened top. The fruit is a berry, often with a single seed.

== Taxonomy ==
The genus Aspidistra was named by the English botanist John Ker Gawler in 1822, as a blend of Greek ασπίς/ασπίδ- aspid-, meaning shield, and the name of the sister genus Tupistra. The genus was at one time placed in a broadly defined Liliaceae, along with many other lilioid monocots. It has also been placed in the families Convallariaceae and Ruscaceae. The APG III system of 2009 places it in the family Asparagaceae, subfamily Convallarioideae.

=== Species ===
Aspidistra is a genus that was largely ignored by field botanists until the 1980s onwards, and there has been a rapid rise in the number of recognised species since then. Some 8 to 10 species were known in the late 1970s; 30 new species were described from China in the 1980s. Subsequently, more new species were found in Vietnam. The online Flora of China uses a narrow definition of species, producing a total of about 55, saying that the genus has "never been well studied". In 2008, Tillich provided the key to the 93 species known at that time.

As of October 2026, Plants of the World Online accepts the following 251 species:

- Aspidistra acetabuliformis Y.Wan & C.C.Huang
- Aspidistra alata Tillich
- Aspidistra albiflora C.R.Lin, W.B.Xu & Yan Liu
- Aspidistra albopurpurea Aver. & Tillich
- Aspidistra albovillosa T.Ding, B.Pan & C.R.Lin
- Aspidistra alternativa D.Fang & L.Y.Yu
- Aspidistra angustata Aver., K.S.Nguyen & Tillich
- Aspidistra anlongensis C.R.Lin & Yan Liu
- Aspidistra anomala Aver. & Tillich
- Aspidistra arnautovii Tillich
- Aspidistra atrata Aver., Tillich & B.H.Quang
- Aspidistra atroviolacea Tillich
- Aspidistra attenuata Hayata
- Aspidistra australis S.Z.He & W.F.Xu
- Aspidistra austrosinensis Y.Wan & C.C.Huang
- Aspidistra austroyunnanensis G.W.Hu, Lei Cai & Q.F.Wang
- Aspidistra averyanovii N.S.Lý & Tillich
- Aspidistra babensis K.S.Nguyen, Aver. & Tillich
- Aspidistra backanensis C.R.Lin, K.S.Nguyen & W.B.Xu
- Aspidistra bamaensis C.R.Lin, Y.Y.Liang & Yan Liu
- Aspidistra basalis Tillich
- Aspidistra bella Aver., Tillich & K.S.Nguyen
- Aspidistra bicolor Tillich
- Aspidistra bogneri Tillich
- Aspidistra brachypetala C.R.Lin & B.Pan
- Aspidistra brachystyla Aver. & Tillich
- Aspidistra cadamensis N.S.Lý & Tillich
- Aspidistra caespitosa C.Pei
- Aspidistra campanulata Tillich
- Aspidistra carinata Y.Wan & X.H.Lu
- Aspidistra carnosa Tillich
- Aspidistra cavicola D.Fang & K.C.Yen
- Aspidistra cerina G.Z.Li & S.C.Tang
- Aspidistra chishuiensis S.Z.He & W.F.Xu
- Aspidistra chongzuoensis C.R.Lin & Y.S.Huang
- Aspidistra chunxiuensis C.R.Lin & Yan Liu
- Aspidistra clausa Vislobokov
- Aspidistra claviformis Y.Wan
- Aspidistra cleistantha D.X.Nong & H.Zhen Lv
- Aspidistra coccigera Aver. & Tillich
- Aspidistra congestiflora Aver., Vislobokov & Nuraliev
- Aspidistra connata Tillich
- Aspidistra corniculata Vislobokov
- Aspidistra crassifila Yan Liu & C.I Peng
- Aspidistra cruciformis Y.Wan & X.H.Lu
- Aspidistra cryptantha Tillich
- Aspidistra cyathiflora Y.Wan & C.C.Huang
- Aspidistra cylindrica Vislobokov & Nuraliev
- Aspidistra dahuaensis D.X.Nong & L.Y.Yu
- Aspidistra daibuensis Hayata
- Aspidistra daqingshanensis Y.L.Pan & C.R.Lin
- Aspidistra daxinensis M.F.Hou & Yan Liu
- Aspidistra dentosa C.R.Lin & Yan Liu
- Aspidistra depingiana Y.H.Tan & H.B.Ding
- Aspidistra dissecta C.R.Lin & Yan Liu
- Aspidistra dodecandra (Gagnep.) Tillich
- Aspidistra dolichanthera X.X.Chen
- Aspidistra dongxingensis C.R.Lin & Yan Liu
- Aspidistra duanensis B.Pan, C.R.Lin & W.B.Xu
- Aspidistra ebianensis K.Y.Lang & Z.Y.Zhu
- Aspidistra elatior Blume
- Aspidistra elegans Aver. & Tillich
- Aspidistra erecta Yan Liu & C.I Peng
- Aspidistra erosa Aver., Tillich, T.A.Le & K.S.Nguyen
- Aspidistra erythrocephala C.R.Lin & Y.Y.Liang
- Aspidistra erythropoecila C.R.Lin, Z.C.Lu & W.B.Xu
- Aspidistra extrorsa C.R.Lin & D.X.Nong
- Aspidistra fasciaria G.Z.Li
- Aspidistra fenghuangensis K.Y.Lang
- Aspidistra fimbriata F.T.Wang & K.Y.Lang
- Aspidistra flaviflora K.Y.Lang & Z.Y.Zhu
- Aspidistra foetida C.R.Lin, L.L.Zou & B.Pan
- Aspidistra foliosa Tillich
- Aspidistra fungilliformis Y.Wan
- Aspidistra geastrum Tillich
- Aspidistra glandulosa (Gagnep.) Tillich
- Aspidistra globosa Vislobokov & Nuraliev
- Aspidistra globulifera (Aver., K.S.Nguyen & Tillich) Aver.
- Aspidistra gracilis Tillich
- Aspidistra graminifolia Aver. & Tillich
- Aspidistra grandiflora Tillich
- Aspidistra guangxiensis S.C.Tang & Yan Liu
- Aspidistra guizhouensis S.Z.He & W.F.Xu
- Aspidistra hainanensis Chun & F.C.How
- Aspidistra hekouensis H.Li, C.L.Long & Bogner
- Aspidistra heterocarpa Aver., Tillich & V.T.Pham
- Aspidistra heterotepala T.C.Hsu & Luu
- Aspidistra hezhouensis Q.Gao & Yan Liu
- Aspidistra huanjiangensis G.Z.Li & Y.G.Wei
- Aspidistra jiangjinensis S.R.Yi & C.R.Lin
- Aspidistra jiewhoei Tillich & Škorničk.
- Aspidistra jingxiensis Yan Liu & C.R.Lin
- Aspidistra khangii Aver. & Tillich
- Aspidistra laongamensis C.R.Lin & X.Y.Huang
- Aspidistra laotica Aver. & Tillich
- Aspidistra larutensis W.J.de Wilde & A.Vogel
- Aspidistra lateralis Tillich
- Aspidistra latistyla F.Y.Mo, C.R.Lin & Yan Liu
- Aspidistra leipingensis Z.B.Ding & R.K.Li
- Aspidistra leshanensis K.Y.Lang & Z.Y.Zhu
- Aspidistra letreae Aver., Tillich & T.A.Le
- Aspidistra leucographa C.R.Lin & C.Y.Zou
- Aspidistra leyeensis Y.Wan & C.C.Huang
- Aspidistra lianhuatanensis H.C.Xi, R.K.Li & W.G.Wang
- Aspidistra liboensis S.Z.He & J.Y.Wu
- Aspidistra liliiflora Aver., Wynn-Jones, N.H.Tuan, K.S.Nguyen, Tillich, V.D.Nguyen
- Aspidistra linearifolia Y.Wan & C.C.Huang
- Aspidistra linearistyla C.X.Peng & C.R.Lin
- Aspidistra lingchuanensis C.R.Lin & L.F.Guo
- Aspidistra lingyunensis C.R.Lin & L.F.Guo
- Aspidistra lobata Tillich
- Aspidistra locii Arnautov & Bogner
- Aspidistra longanensis Y.Wan
- Aspidistra longgangensis C.R.Lin, Y.S.Huang & Yan Liu
- Aspidistra longhuiensis G.W.Hu, Zhi Wang & Q.F.Wang
- Aspidistra longibracteata C.R.Lin & K.S.Nguyen
- Aspidistra longiconnectiva C.T.Lu, K.C.Chuang & J.C.Wang
- Aspidistra longifolia Hook.f.
- Aspidistra longiloba G.Z.Li
- Aspidistra longipedunculata D.Fang
- Aspidistra longipetala S.Z.Huang
- Aspidistra longituba Yan Liu & C.R.Lin
- Aspidistra longjiangensis C.R.Lin, W.B.Xu & Yan Liu
- Aspidistra longshengensis C.R.Lin & W.B.Xu
- Aspidistra longzhouensis C.R.Lin, Tao Meng & Yan Liu
- Aspidistra lubae Aver. & Tillich
- Aspidistra luochengensis B.Pan & C.R.Lin
- Aspidistra luodianensis D.D.Tao
- Aspidistra luofushanensis C.R.Lin, Z.R.Liu & Y.B.Zeng
- Aspidistra lurida Ker Gawl.
- Aspidistra lutea Tillich
- Aspidistra luteorubra (K.S.Nguyen, Aver. & Tillich) Aver. & K.S.Nguyen
- Aspidistra magnifica N.S.Lý, K.S.Nguyen & T.S.Hoang
- Aspidistra maguanensis S.Z.He & D.H.Lv
- Aspidistra marasmioides Tillich
- Aspidistra marginella D.Fang & L.Zeng
- Aspidistra medusa Aver., K.S.Nguyen & Tillich
- Aspidistra melanaster Aver., K.S.Nguyen & Tillich
- Aspidistra micrantha Vislobokov & Nuraliev
- Aspidistra microstyla Aver., V.C.Nguyen, Nuraliev & Vislobokov
- Aspidistra minor Vislobokov, Nuraliev & M.S.Romanov
- Aspidistra minutiflora Stapf
- Aspidistra mirostigma Tillich & Škorničk.
- Aspidistra mokokchungensis D.K.Roy, Odyuo, Lytan, Biate, Punat. & A.A.Mao
- Aspidistra molendinacea G.Z.Li & S.C.Tang
- Aspidistra multiflora Aver. & Tillich
- Aspidistra muricata F.C.How
- Aspidistra mushaensis Hayata
- Aspidistra nanchuanensis Tillich
- Aspidistra nankunshanensis Yan Liu & C.R.Lin
- Aspidistra neglecta Aver., Tillich & K.S.Nguyen
- Aspidistra nguyenii Aver., V.C.Nguyen, Nuraliev & Vislobokov
- Aspidistra nigra Aver., Tillich & K.S.Nguyen
- Aspidistra nigrescens Aver. & C.H.Nguyen
- Aspidistra nikitensis Kalyuzhny & Vislobokov
- Aspidistra nikolaii Aver. & Tillich
- Aspidistra nitens Aver., K.S.Nguyen & Tillich
- Aspidistra nutans Aver. & Tillich
- Aspidistra obconica C.R.Lin & Yan Liu
- Aspidistra oblanceifolia F.T.Wang & K.Y.Lang
- Aspidistra obliqua K.S.Nguyen & Aver.
- Aspidistra obliquipeltata D.Fang & L.Y.Yu
- Aspidistra oblongifolia F.T.Wang & K.Y.Lang
- Aspidistra obtusata Vislobokov
- Aspidistra omeiensis Z.Y.Zhu & J.L.Zhang
- Aspidistra opaca Tillich
- Aspidistra ovatianthera C.R.Lin & Y.S.Huang
- Aspidistra ovatifolia Yan Liu & C.R.Lin
- Aspidistra oviflora Aver. & Tillich
- Aspidistra pangtiensis D.K.Roy, Y.Mahesh, Odyuo & N.Tanaka
- Aspidistra papillata G.Z.Li
- Aspidistra partita Y.H.Tan & H.B.Ding
- Aspidistra patentiloba Y.Wan & X.H.Lu
- Aspidistra paucitepala Vislobokov, Nuraliev & D.D.Sokoloff
- Aspidistra peltata Aver., Vuong, T.N.Bon & V.S.Dang
- Aspidistra pentagona Aver., K.S.Nguyen & Tillich
- Aspidistra petiolata Tillich
- Aspidistra phanluongii Vislobokov
- Aspidistra phongdiensis D.Dien, T.A.Le & Vislobokov
- Aspidistra pileata D.Fang & L.Y.Yu
- Aspidistra pingfaensis S.Z.He & Q.W.Sun
- Aspidistra pingtangensis S.Z.He, W.F.Xu & Q.W.Sun
- Aspidistra polypetala C.R.Lin & Yan Liu
- Aspidistra pulchella B.M.Wang & Yan Liu
- Aspidistra punctata Lindl.
- Aspidistra punctatoides Yan Liu & C.R.Lin
- Aspidistra purpureomaculata H.C.Xi, J.T.Yin & W.G.Wang
- Aspidistra qijiangensis S.Z.He & X.Y.Luo
- Aspidistra quadripartita G.Z.Li & S.C.Tang
- Aspidistra quangngaiensis N.S.Lý, Haev. & Tillich
- Aspidistra quanii Aver. & V.C.Nguyen
- Aspidistra radiata G.W.Hu & Q.F.Wang
- Aspidistra recondita Tillich
- Aspidistra retusa K.Y.Lang & S.Z.Huang
- Aspidistra revoluta Hao Zhou, S.R.Yi & Q.Gao
- Aspidistra ronganensis C.R.Lin, Jing Liu & W.B.Xu
- Aspidistra saccata Xue Y.Huang, Y.D.Peng & D.X.Nong
- Aspidistra sarcantha Aver., Tillich, T.A.Le & K.S.Nguyen
- Aspidistra saxicola Y.Wan
- Aspidistra semiaperta Aver. & Tillich
- Aspidistra sessiliflora Aver. & Tillich
- Aspidistra sessilistigma Aver., Wynn-Jones, N.H.Tuan, K.S.Nguyen, Tillich, V.D.Nguyen
- Aspidistra shangsiensis C.R.Lin & Y.Y.Liang
- Aspidistra shimentaiensis C.X.Peng, Y.Q.Li & C.R.Lin
- Aspidistra shiwandashanensis C.R.Lin & W.B.Xu
- Aspidistra shoukaensis S.S.Ying
- Aspidistra sichuanensis K.Y.Lang & Z.Y.Zhu
- Aspidistra sinensis Aver. & Tillich
- Aspidistra sinuata Aver. & Tillich
- Aspidistra sonlaensis T.N.Bon, V.T.Pham, Nuraliev & Vislobokov
- Aspidistra spinula S.Z.He
- Aspidistra stellata Aver. & Tillich
- Aspidistra stenophylla C.R.Lin & R.C.Hu
- Aspidistra stricta Tillich
- Aspidistra subrotata Y.Wan & C.C.Huang
- Aspidistra superba Tillich
- Aspidistra sutepensis K.Larsen
- Aspidistra synpetala C.R.Lin & Yan Liu
- Aspidistra tenuifolia C.R.Lin & J.C.Yang
- Aspidistra tenuistyla Aver., C.H.Nguyen & K.S.Nguyen
- Aspidistra thuongiana Vislobokov, Nuraliev, V.C.Nguyen & V.T.Pham
- Aspidistra tillichiana O.Colin
- Aspidistra tonkinensis (Gagnep.) F.T.Wang & K.Y.Lang
- Aspidistra triloba F.T.Wang & K.Y.Lang
- Aspidistra tripartita Vislobokov & Nuraliev
- Aspidistra triquetra Aver., Son, Tillich & K.S.Nguyen
- Aspidistra triradiata Vislobokov
- Aspidistra truongii Aver. & Tillich
- Aspidistra tubiflora Tillich
- Aspidistra typica Baill.
- Aspidistra umbrosa Tillich
- Aspidistra urceolata F.T.Wang & K.Y.Lang
- Aspidistra ventricosa Tillich & Škorničk.
- Aspidistra verruculosa Aver., Tillich & D.D.Nguyen
- Aspidistra vietnamensis (Aver. & Tillich) Aver. & Tillich
- Aspidistra viridiflora Vislobokov & Nuraliev
- Aspidistra wujiangensis W.F.Xu & S.Z.He
- Aspidistra xiaoyunii C.R.Lin, B.M.Wang & Yan Liu
- Aspidistra xichouensis Lei Cai, Z.L.Dao & G.W.Hu
- Aspidistra xilinensis Y.Wan & X.H.Lu
- Aspidistra xuansonensis Vislobokov
- Aspidistra yachangensis C.R.Lin, B.Pan & Yan Liu
- Aspidistra yangchunensis S.P.Dong & Z.L.Ning
- Aspidistra yingjiangensis L.J.Peng
- Aspidistra yizhouensis B.Pan & C.R.Lin
- Aspidistra yuelushanensis L.Wu & X.L.Yu
- Aspidistra yunbiaoi C.R.Lin & Yan Liu
- Aspidistra yunwuensis S.Z.He & W.F.Xu
- Aspidistra zhangii Aver., Tillich & K.S.Nguyen
- Aspidistra zhenganensis S.Z.He & Y.Wang
- Aspidistra zongbayi K.Y.Lang & Z.Y.Zhu

== Distribution and ecology ==
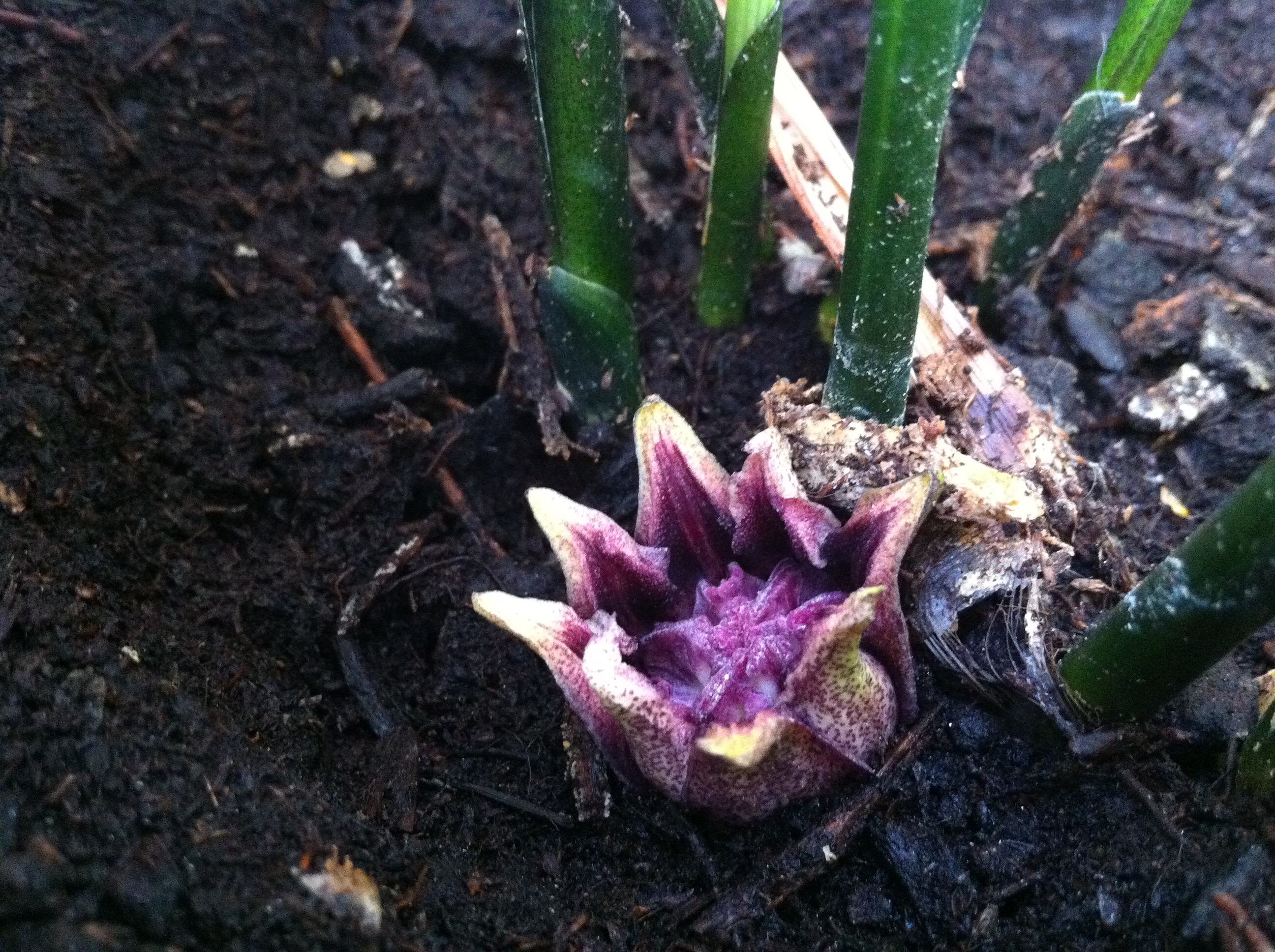
Aspidistra flower

Species of Aspidistra are part of the ground flora, growing in forests and under shrubs, in areas of high rainfall, from eastern India, Indochina and China through to Japan. The largest number of species are found in Guangxi Province, China, with Vietnam occupying second place. Few species have a broad distribution, with many being endemic to China or Vietnam.

It has long been said that slugs and snails pollinate Aspidistra flowers. This has been described as a "myth". Amphipods, small terrestrial crustaceans, are responsible for pollinating A. elatior in Japan. Amphipods have also been shown to pollinate species of Aspidistra introduced to Australia. Springtails and fungus gnats have also been suggested as pollinators. The newly described Vietnamese species A. phanluongii is probably pollinated by flies of the genus Megaselia.

== Cultivation and uses ==
Aspidistra elatior, the "cast-iron plant", is a popular houseplant, surviving shade, cool conditions and neglect. It is one of several species of Aspidistra that can be grown successfully outdoors in shade in temperate climates, where they will generally cope with temperatures down to −5 °C (23 °F), being killed by frosts of −5 to −10 °C (23 to 14 °F) or below. In addition to shade, aspidistras require an open, acidic and humus-rich soil. Species suggested for growing outdoors in the UK include A. diabuensis, A. elatior, A. lurida, A. typica, A. zongbyi and their cultivars.

Aspidistras can withstand deep shade, neglect, dry soil, hot temperatures and polluted indoor air (from burning coal or natural gas) but are sensitive to bright sunlight.

In Japan, leaves of A. elatior have traditionally been cut into pieces and used in bento and osechi boxes to keep each food separated. However, imitations called "baran" are commonly used now.

== In popular culture ==
As a popular foliage houseplant, A. elatior became popular in late Victorian Britain and was so common that it became a "symbol of dull middle-class respectability". As such, it was central to George Orwell's novel Keep the Aspidistra Flying, as a symbol of the need of the middle class to maintain respectability according to Gordon Comstock, the novel's protagonist. It was further immortalised in the 1938 song "The Biggest Aspidistra in the World", which, as sung by Gracie Fields, became a popular wartime classic. An aspidistra is mentioned in the Wallace and Gromit short, "The Autochef", from the Cracking Contraptions series. In two Dorothy L. Sayers books from the mid-1930s, Busman's Honeymoon and The Nine Tailors, characters make disparaging remarks about aspidistras. Aspidistras are placed on a piano that is the scene of a murder in Ngaio Marsh's Overture to Death.

"Aspidistra" was the codename (inspired by the above song) of a very powerful British radio transmitter used for propaganda and deception purposes against Nazi Germany during World War II.

The 1980s British television show The Adventure Game featured a moving aspidistra called the Rangdo of Arg, operated by Kenny Baker.
