= Intimate Relations (1996 film) =

Canadian-British film

- VHS cover
- Directed by: Philip Goodhew
- Written by: Philip Goodhew
- Produced by: Angela Hart; Lisa Hope; Jon Slann
- Starring: Julie Walters; Rupert Graves; Matthew Walker; Laura Sadler
- Cinematography: Andres Garreton
- Edited by: Pia Di Ciaula
- Music by: Lawrence Shragge
- Distributed by: Lions Gate Films (Canada); 20th Century Fox (United Kingdom)
- Release dates: 10 September 1996 (TIFF); 20 June 1997 (UK)
- Running time: 105 minutes
- Countries: Canada; United Kingdom
- Language: English

Intimate Relations is a 1996 Canadian-British film, the first movie by writer and director Philip Goodhew. It stars Rupert Graves, Julie Walters and a fifteen-year-old Laura Sadler, the only feature film in her short career. The film is a drama and black comedy about a young man who has an affair with the middle-aged housewife he is lodging with. Matters are soon complicated when the housewife's teenage daughter gets involved after developing a crush on the young lodger.

The film takes place in the 1950s in the suburbs of London. The film depicts the hypocritically prudish residents of a seemingly respectable household who, behind closed doors, indulge in the sort of sordid goings on they would publicly sneer at.

== Plot ==
Marjorie Beaslie is a housewife in her forties who takes in a lodger named Harold Guppey, who has just stumbled into town to look up his long-lost brother. Although seemingly prudish (she no longer sleeps in the same bed as her husband, for "medical reasons"), Marjorie takes a liking to Harold despite him being a good twenty years her junior, and they begin to have a clandestine affair. Marjorie insists that Harold refer to her as "mum", giving more than a little oedipal slant to their lustful antics.

Marjorie's youngest daughter is fourteen-year-old Joyce, a precocious girl who alternates between trying to act grown up by putting on make up and smoking cigarettes, and acting childish by disturbing people with tales of medieval punishments and giggling at rude words.

Joyce is fascinated by Harold and with her teasing behaviour she cunningly turns him from being apathetic towards her to being intrigued. When Joyce catches Harold and Marjorie in bed together, she seemingly does not realise what they are up to and merely thinks they're having an innocent "bunk up". She talks her way into getting into the bed with them. Harold and Marjorie continue their intimate relations whilst Joyce pretends to be asleep, realising what is actually going on.

A few days later, Joyce blackmails Harold into taking her to a hotel for the night, where he turns the tables on her with every intent and purpose but actually diverts his attention by doing much the opposite as he seduces her before spurning her.

Marjorie's much-older husband, Stanley, is a one-legged World War I veteran who sleeps in a separate room and is oblivious to Harold's relationships with either Marjorie or Joyce, as is the rest of their suburban community.

Sick of being caught between a mother and daughter, who are too old and too young for him respectively, Harold tries to get out of the house and move away by joining the army and getting a new girlfriend. However, Marjorie manages to emotionally blackmail him into coming back. One day, Harold takes Marjorie and Joyce out for a picnic, although things are tense between the trio. Having sent her daughter Joyce away to play, Marjorie begins to ravish Harold, but Joyce returns and hits her mother with an axe. Harold panics and attempts to get Marjorie into the car to take her to hospital but, with blood streaming down her face, Marjorie manages to pick up a knife Harold drops and attacks him with it. Harold fights Marjorie off and stabs her to death. Joyce then tries to attack Harold and he stabs her to death too. Finally, Harold stabs himself in the stomach in an attempt to emphasise that his actions were out of self-defence.

It is said in a post-script that he, the real Albert Goozee, was sentenced to death for Joyce's murder.

== Cast ==
- Julie Walters as Marjorie Beasley
- Rupert Graves as Harold Guppey
- Laura Sadler as Joyce Beasley
- Matthew Walker as Stanley Beasley
- Les Dennis as Maurice Guppey
- Amanda Holden as Pamela
- Michael Bertenshaw as Mr Pugh
- Elsie Kelly as Enid
- Nicholas Hoult as Bobby

== Inspiration ==
The film is based on the true story of Albert Goozee, who was put on trial in 1956 in England. He was arrested after his 53-year-old landlady, Mrs. Lydia Leakey, and her 14-year-old daughter, Norma, were found dead. Goozee was tried only for the murder of the teenaged girl (Joyce, in the movie), convicted and imprisoned for life. The movie follows Goozee's own version of events, portraying him as an increasingly desperate young man caught in a love triangle between a mother and daughter, although as the only survivor there is no way of verifying if his version of the events was entirely truthful.

Goozee was released from prison in 1971 but was imprisoned again in 1996, the year Intimate Relations came out, for unrelated sex offences.

== Reception ==
In a review that awarded 2 stars out of 4, Roger Ebert wrote, "'Intimate Relations' is about the same sort of repressed sexual goofiness that found an outlet in Heavenly Creatures, that New Zealand film about the two close friends who committed murder together, or The Young Poisoner's Handbook about the earnest young man whose chemistry experiments went entirely too far. Its deadpan humor is entertaining, up to a point, but that point is passed before the movie is quite at its halfway point, and then we're left watching increasingly desperate people who are trapped by one another’s madness."
