= The Biggest Aspidistra in the World =

Single by Gracie Fields
- A-side: "Now It Can Be Told"
- Recorded: 18 November 1938
- Label: Regal Zonophone MR 2889
- Songwriter(s): Tommie Connor, Jimmy Harper, Will Haines

"The Biggest Aspidistra in the World" is a comic song first recorded by English singer Gracie Fields in November 1938, for inclusion in the film Keep Smiling.

The song was written by Tommie Connor and Jimmy Harper (aka James S. Hancock), co-credited to music publisher Will Haines, and the recording was arranged by George Scott-Wood.

Aspidistras were popular houseplants in Britain in the 19th and early 20th centuries. The song tells of a plant "in a flower pot, on the what-not, near the hatstand in the hall" – "It didn't seem to grow 'til one day our brother Joe/ Had a notion that he'd make it strong and tall/ So he crossed it with an acorn from an oak tree/ And planted it against the garden wall/ It shot up like a rocket, nearly touched the sky/ It's the biggest aspidistra in the world." The song became popular, and Gracie Fields re-recorded it in 1941 with additional verses referencing Hitler, (as Original Mix) and in a live recording in 1951.

The song inspired the name of the Aspidistra radio transmitter, at its time the most powerful broadcast transmitter in the world, built in 1942 near Crowborough in Sussex to beam signals into Europe during the Second World War.
