= Lucy Davis =

British actress and comedian (born 1973)

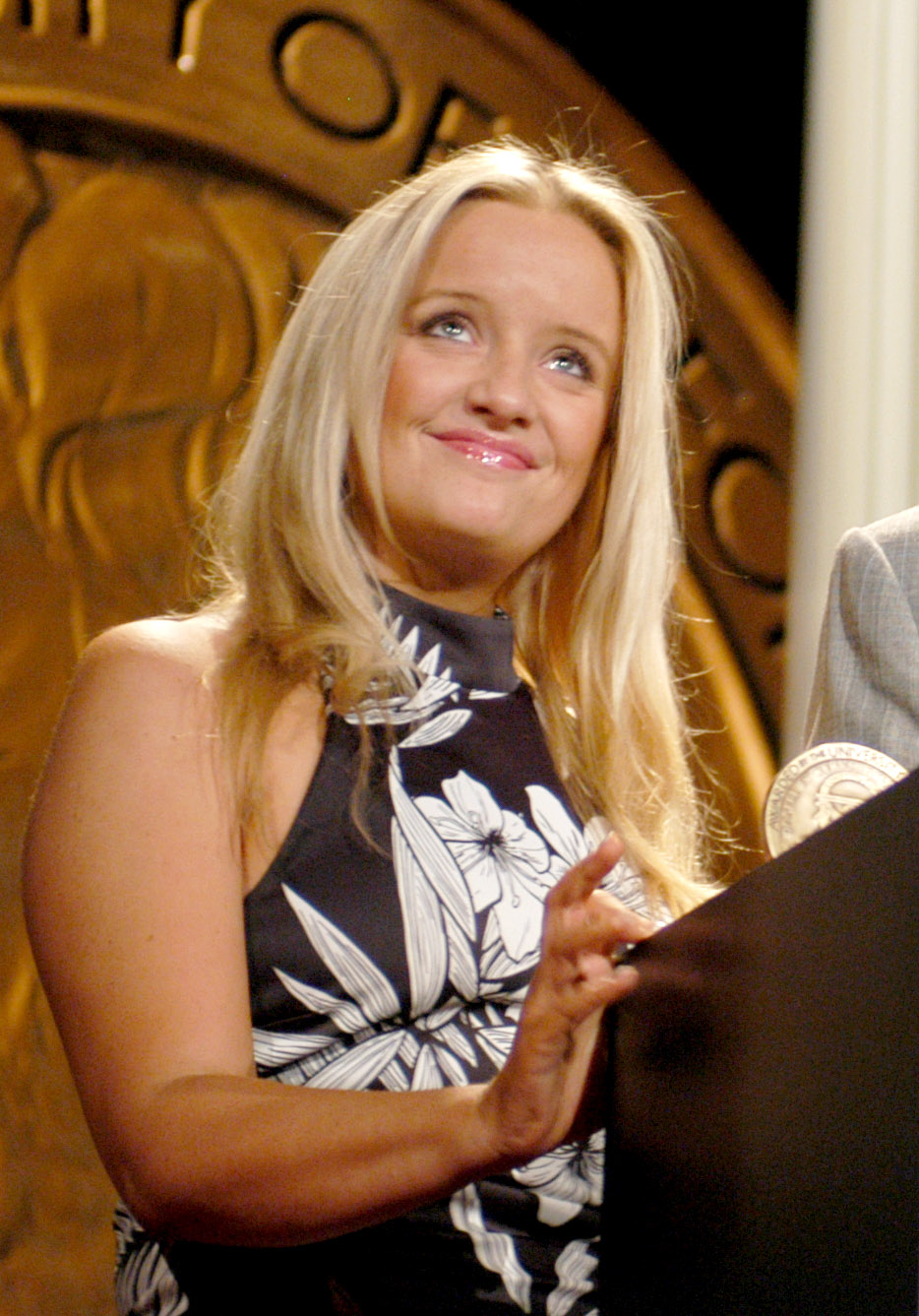
- Davis in 2004
- Born: Lucy Clare Davis; 17 February 1973 (age 53); Birmingham, England
- Education: Italia Conti Academy of Theatre Arts
- Occupations: Actress; comedian
- Years active: 1993–present
- Spouse: Owain Yeoman (m. 2006; div. 2011)
- Father: Jasper Carrott

Lucy Clare Davis (born 17 February 1973) is an English actress and comedian known for playing Dawn Tinsley in the BBC mockumentary television sitcom The Office (2001–2003), Hilda Spellman in the Netflix supernatural horror television series Chilling Adventures of Sabrina (2018–2020), Dianne in the zombie comedy film Shaun of the Dead (2004), and Etta Candy in the superhero film Wonder Woman (2017). She played Eva in Disney Channel's comedy television series The Villains of Valley View (2022–2023).

== Early life ==
Lucy Clare Davis was born on 17 February 1973, in Birmingham, England. Her father is the comedian Jasper Carrott (Robert Norman Davis). She was educated at the Italia Conti Academy of Theatre Arts.

== Career ==
Davis appeared briefly in an episode of The Detectives, a show created by and starring her father. She played Maria Lucas in the BBC's 1995 production of Pride and Prejudice, and also had a role in the 1996 Christmas special of One Foot in the Grave. After her breakthrough role as Dawn Tinsley in The Office, she appeared in the films Sex Lives of the Potato Men and Shaun of the Dead in 2004, whilst continuing to play Hayley Jordan in The Archers on BBC Radio 4. She gave up this last role when her other acting responsibilities made it impossible to continue, and the part was recast in September 2005.

Davis appeared in the third-season episode "Elephants and Hens" of UK TV programme Black Books. In 2006, she appeared as the "Fashion TV" host on ABC's Ugly Betty, and later that year played writer Lucy Kenwright in NBC's Studio 60 on the Sunset Strip. In 2008, she appeared in several episodes of the US series Reaper. In 2010, she starred in ITV's six-episode comedy drama, Married Single Other, and also appeared in a guest role in The Mentalist alongside her then-husband Owain Yeoman. She also appears in the John Landis-produced thriller Some Guy Who Kills People. In 2012, she had a guest voice part in Family Guy for the episode "Be Careful What You Fish For". She appeared in series two, episode eight of the BBC series Death in Paradise (2013). She became a Patron for the performing arts group Theatretrain in 2012.

Davis played Etta Candy in the 2017 film Wonder Woman, the first live-action cinematic portrayal of the comic book character. She said of the character: "She's a woman in a man's world and so being heard and seen aren't the easiest things, but it kind of doesn't deter her. Etta is unapologetically herself and I think that that's the thing that has drawn me to her the most... it took quite a while in my life to be unapologetically myself."

Davis appeared in the Netflix series Chilling Adventures of Sabrina as Hilda Spellman, which aired from 2018 to 2020. She played Eva, known as the supervillain Surge, on the Disney Channel sitcom The Villains of Valley View which premiered on 3 June 2022.

== Personal life ==
Davis is the daughter of Hazel Jackson and comedian Robert Davis, better known as Jasper Carrott. In December 1997, she underwent a kidney transplantation after being diagnosed with kidney failure during a medical examination. Her mother donated the kidney. Around Christmas 2005, she was again hospitalised for kidney failure but recovered. She also has type 1 diabetes.

On 9 December 2006, Davis married the Welsh actor Owain Yeoman at St Paul's Cathedral in London. The wedding was attended by fellow The Office cast members and writers. She was entitled to marry there as her father is an Officer of the Order of the British Empire (OBE), and St Paul's contains the chapel of the order. Davis and Yeoman separated in January 2011 and divorced in October that year.

In 2007, Davis posed nude in People for the Ethical Treatment of Animals (PETA)'s campaign against the Guards Division's continued use of traditional bearskin caps.

In August 2026, Davis announced that she had been diagnosed with stage IV incurable breast cancer which had spread to her bones.

== Filmography ==
=== Film ===
Year	Title	Role	Notes
1997	The Gambler	Dunya	
2002	Nicholas Nickleby	Maid	
2004	Sex Lives of the Potato Men	Ruth	
2004	Shaun of the Dead	Dianne	
2005	Rag Tale	Debbs	
2006	The TV Set	Chloe McCallister	
2006	Garfield: A Tail of Two Kitties	Abby Westminster	
2008	Shades of Ray	Director #2	
2009	All About Steve	Patient	
2009	Bob Funk	Janet	
2011	Some Guy Who Kills People	Stephanie	
2014	Postman Pat: The Movie	Director 1	Voice role
2017	Wonder Woman	Etta Candy	

=== Television ===
Year	Title	Role	Notes
1993	The Detectives	Young Girl #1	Episode: "Strangers in Paradise"
1994	Blue Heaven	Secretary	Episode #1.3
1994	Woof!	Eileen Tully	Episode: "Get Me to the Church"
1995	Casualty	Sarah Jackson	Episode: "Branded"
1995	The Bill	Jude Mackie	Episode: "Charity and Beating"
1995	Pride and Prejudice	Maria Lucas	5 episodes
1996	Scene	Julie	Episode: "Alison"
1996	One Foot in the Grave	Mrs. Blanchard	Episode: "Starbound"
1997	The Grand	Maggie Rigby	Episode #1.5
1999–2000	Belfry Witches	Old Noshie	13 episodes
2000	Doctors	Nicky Andrews	Episode: "False Alarm"
2001	Big Bad World	Harry	Episode: "Tory Girl"
2001	Bernard's Watch	Madeleine	6 episodes
2001–2003	The Office	Dawn Tinsley	Main character; 14 episodes
2002	Murder in Mind	Kerry	Episode: "Passion"
2002	Holby City	Kelly Bridges	Episode: "Sweet Love Remembered"
2002	Dalziel and Pascoe	Jax / Angela Ripley	2 episodes
2003	The Afternoon Play	Laura	Episode: "The Real Arnie Griffin"
2004	Black Books	Becky	Episode: "Elephants and Hens"
2004	The Legend of The Tamworth Two	Sundance (voice)	TV movie
2006–2007	Ugly Betty	Fashion TV Anchor	2 episodes
2006–2007	Studio 60 on the Sunset Strip	Lucy Kenwright	16 episodes
2007	Californication	Nora	Episode: "Hell-A Woman"
2008	Reaper	Sara	3 episodes
2008–2009	Phineas and Ferb	Crash (voice)	2 episodes
2010	Married Single Other	Lillie	6 episodes
2010	The Mentalist	Daphne Valiquette	Episode: "18-5-4"
2012	Family Guy	Joanne Finn (voice)	Episode: "Be Careful What You Fish For"
2013	Death in Paradise	Vicky Woodward	Episode #2.8
2013	The Neighbors	Helen Redding Kemper	Episode: "The Neighbours"
2015	NCIS	Janice Brown	Episode: "Lockdown"
2015–2016	Maron	Emily	6 episodes
2016–2017	Better Things	Macy	8 episodes
2018–2020	Chilling Adventures of Sabrina	Hilda Spellman	Main cast
2018–2020	Tigtone	Queen	9 episodes
2019	Bob's Burgers	Princess Paula McCartney (voice)	Episode: "Bed, Bob and Beyond"
2019	Carmen Sandiego	The Mechanic (voice)	Episode: "The Need For Speed Caper"
2022–2023	The Villains of Valley View	Eva/Surge	Main role

=== Radio ===
Year	Title	Role	Notes
1995–2005	The Archers	Hayley Jordan	

== Awards and nominations ==
Date	Award	Category	Work	Result	Ref.
2004	Loaded Lafta Awards	Funniest woman		Won	
2024	Romford Film Festival	Best Actress	Have a Good Day (Short film)	Nominated	
