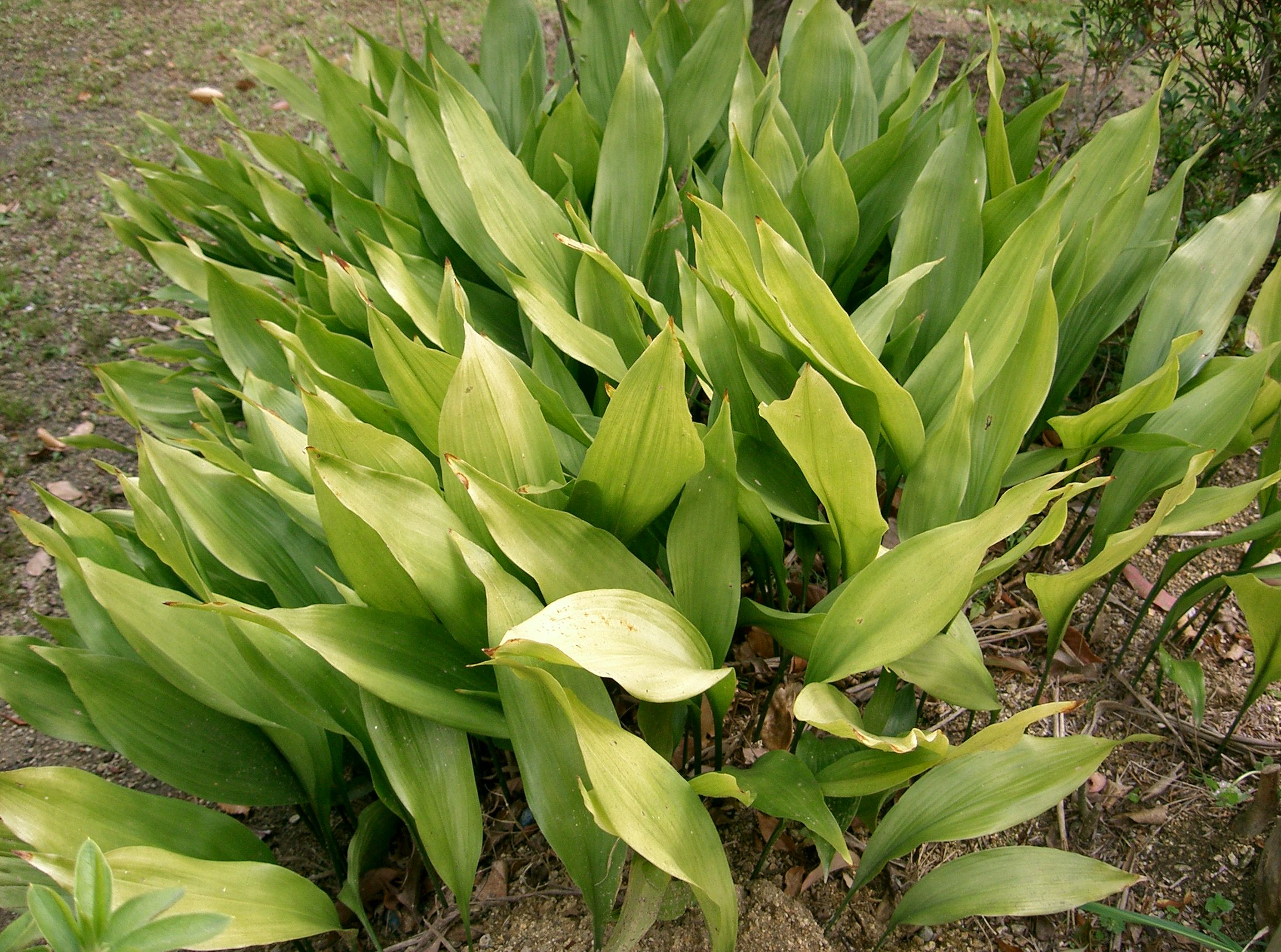

Scientific classification
- Kingdom: Plantae
- Clade: Embryophytes
- Clade: Tracheophytes
- Clade: Spermatophytes
- Clade: Angiosperms
- Clade: Monocots
- Order: Asparagales
- Family: Asparagaceae
- Subfamily: Convallarioideae
- Genus: Aspidistra
- Species: A. elatior

Binomial name
- Aspidistra elatior Blume

Synonyms
- Aspidistra attenuata Hayata; Aspidistra variegata (Link) Regel; Plectogyne variegata Link

= Aspidistra elatior =

Species of flowering plant

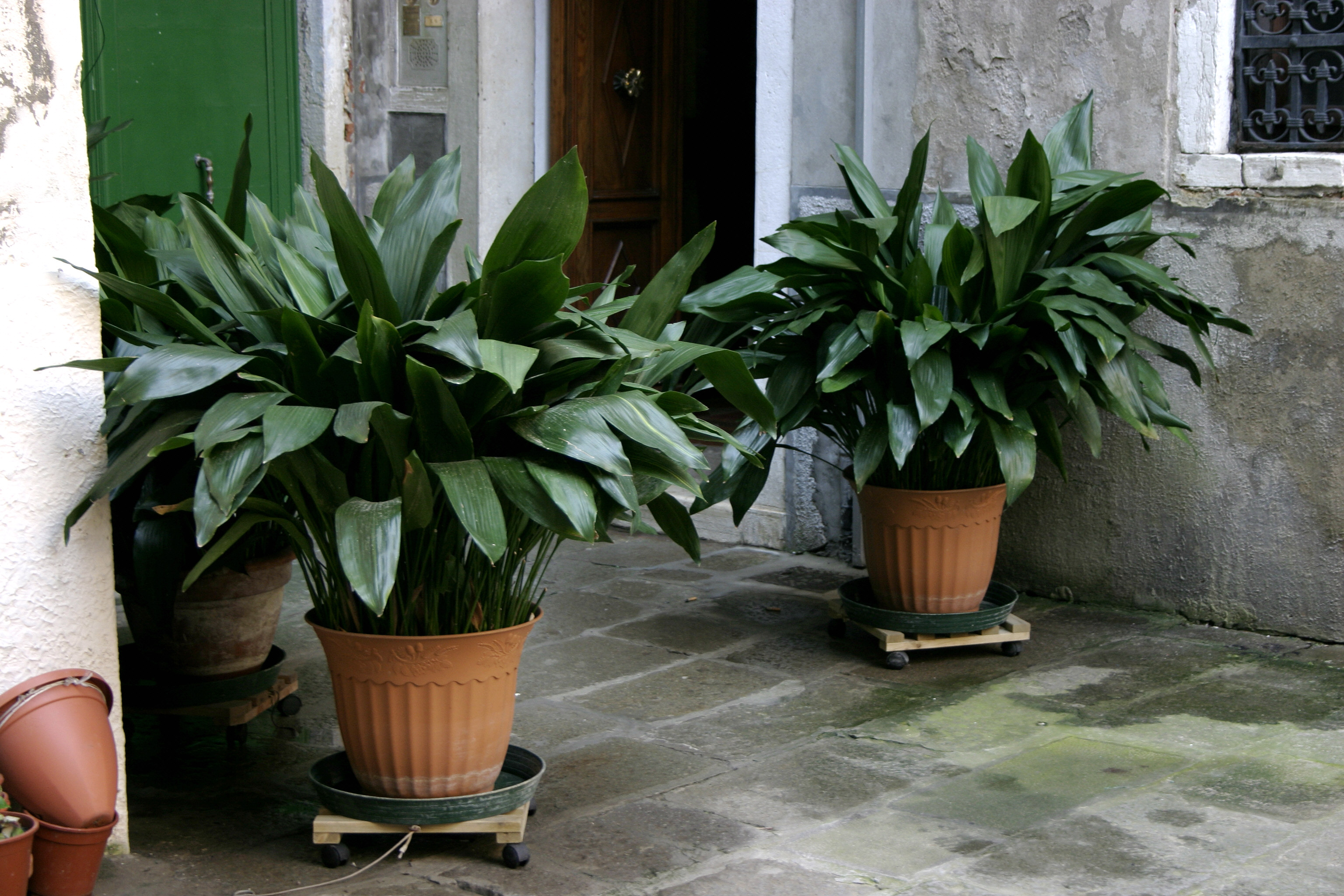
A pair of potted Aspidistra elatior

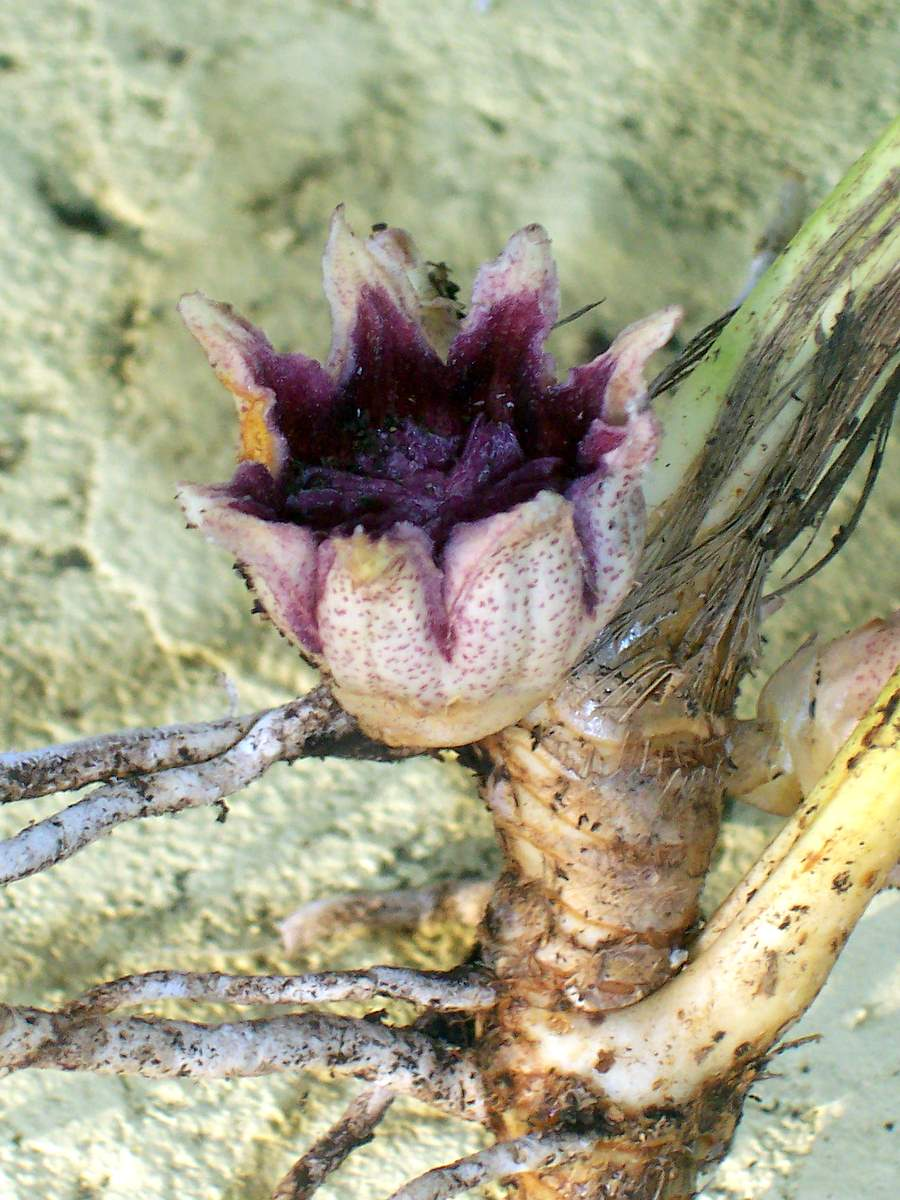
Flower

Aspidistra elatior, the cast-iron-plant or bar-room plant, also known in Japanese as haran or baran (葉蘭) is a species of flowering plant in the family Asparagaceae, native to Japan and Taiwan. Tolerant of neglect, it is widely cultivated as a houseplant, but can also be grown outside in shade where temperatures remain above −15 °C (5 °F). It is used as training material for the seika form of ikebana.

== Description ==
Growing to 60 cm (24 in) tall and wide, it is an evergreen rhizomatous perennial, with glossy dark-green leaves 30–50 cm (12–20 in) long and fleshy 8-lobed cream flowers with maroon colouring on the inner surface borne in early summer.

== Pollination ==
According to a study published in 2018, A. elatior appears to be mainly pollinated by fungus gnats (Cordyla sixi and Bradysia spp.).

== Distribution ==
Although sometimes thought to be of Chinese origin, the species is in fact native to southern Japan, including Kuroshima, Suwanosejima and the Uji Islands. It occurs in association with overstorey species such as Ardisia sieboldii and Castanopsis sieboldii.

== Cultivation ==
A. elatior is well known in cultivation and has a reputation for withstanding neglect, giving rise to its common name of cast-iron plant. It is tolerant of low light, low humidity, temperature fluctuation and irregular watering. It is best situated in a position away from direct sun to avoid leaf bleaching. Good drainage is also required for optimal growth and to avoid root rot. Widely grown as a house plant, it can also be grown successfully outdoors in shade in temperate climates, where plants will generally cope with temperatures down to −15 °C (5 °F) but be killed by frosts of −15 to −20 °C (5 to −4 °F) or below.

The species is not seriously troubled by insects, but mites and scale may cause occasional problems. Its leaves and roots may be subject to browsing by hoofed mammals such as deer, as well as rodents and rabbits.

This plant has gained the Royal Horticultural Society's Award of Garden Merit.

A number of cultivars are available, including:

- 'Asahi' (meaning "morning sun" in Japanese) – the leaves open chocolate brown, turning green from the base upwards
- 'Hoshi-zora' (meaning "starry sky" in Japanese) – large, faintly speckled leaves
- 'Lennon's Song' – long narrow ends to the leaves and a central paler green stripe (discovered by an American grower of cut foliage, Robin Lennon)
- 'Variegata' – with white stripes running along the length of the leaf; has also won the AGM

A. elatior 'Milky Way' is properly A. lurida 'Ginga'.
