= Hannen =

Hannen is a surname. Notable people with the surname include:

- Hermione Hannen, British actress
- Isobel Hannen (née Torrance Jr.) (born 1962), Scottish curler and coach
- James Hannen (Baron Hannen), British judge
- Sir Nicholas John Hannen, British barrister, judge and diplomat
- Nicholas "Beau" Hannen, British actor
- Athene Seyler, married to Nicholas "Beau" Hannen, also went by the name Athene Hannen in her personal life
