= Carandini =

Carandini is a surname. Notable people with the surname include:

- Andrea Carandini (born 1937), Italian professor of archaeology
- Christopher Frank Carandini Lee (1922–2015), English actor, singer and author
- Filippo Carandini (1729–1810), Italian Roman Catholic cardinal
- Francesco Carandini (1858–1946), Italian poet and historian
- Marie Carandini (1826–1894), English-Australian opera singer
- Matteo Carandini (born 1967), Italian neuroscientist
- Nicolò Carandini (1896–1972), Italian politician

== See also ==
- House of Carandini, Italian noble family
