= Uncle Vanya =

1899 play by Anton Chekhov

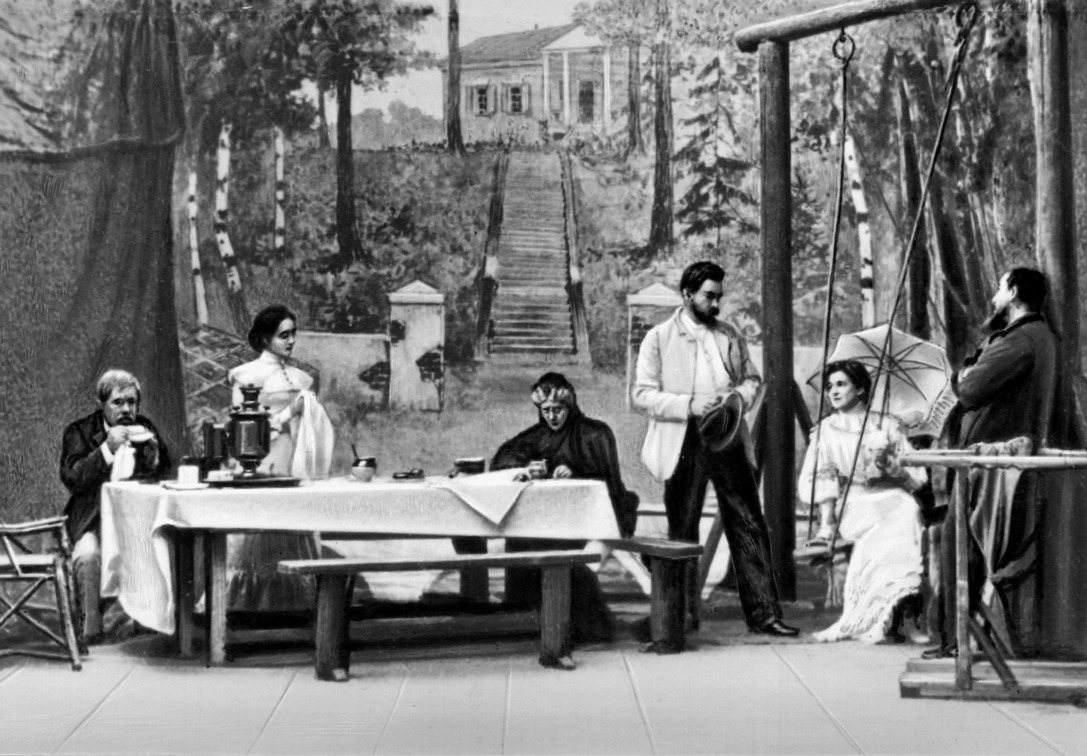
- Scene in the Moscow Art Theatre production in 1899
- Original language: Russian
- Written by: Anton Chekhov
- Genre: tragicomedy, realism
- Setting: Garden of the Serebryakov family estate, Russia

Premiere
- Date: 1897
- Place: Rostov-on-Don

Uncle Vanya (Russian: Дя́дя Ва́ня, romanized: Dyádya Ványa, IPA: [ˈdʲædʲə ˈvanʲə]) is a realist play by the Russian playwright Anton Chekhov. It was first published in 1897, and first produced in 1899 by the Moscow Art Theatre, directed by Konstantin Stanislavski.

The play portrays the visit of an elderly professor and his glamorous, much younger second wife, Yelena, to the rural estate of the professor's late first wife that now supports their urban lifestyle. Two friends—Vanya, brother of the professor's late first wife, who has long managed the estate, and Astrov, the local doctor—both fall under Yelena's spell while bemoaning the ennui of their provincial existence. Sonya, the professor's daughter by his first wife, who has worked with Vanya to keep the estate going, suffers from her unrequited feelings for Astrov. Matters are brought to a crisis when the professor announces his intention to sell the estate, Vanya and Sonya's home, with a view to investing the proceeds to achieve a higher income for himself and his wife.

== Background ==
Uncle Vanya is unique among Chekhov's major plays because it is essentially an extensive reworking of The Wood Demon, a play he published a decade earlier. By elucidating the specific changes Chekhov made during the revision process—these include reducing the cast from almost two dozen down to nine, changing the climactic suicide of The Wood Demon into the famous failed homicide of Uncle Vanya, and altering the original happy ending into an ambiguous, less final resolution—critics such as Donald Rayfield, Richard Gilman, and Eric Bentley have sought to chart the development of Chekhov's dramaturgical method through the 1890s.

Rayfield cites recent scholarship suggesting Chekhov revised The Wood Demon during his trip to the island of Sakhalin, a prison colony in Eastern Russia, in 1891.

== Characters and cast ==
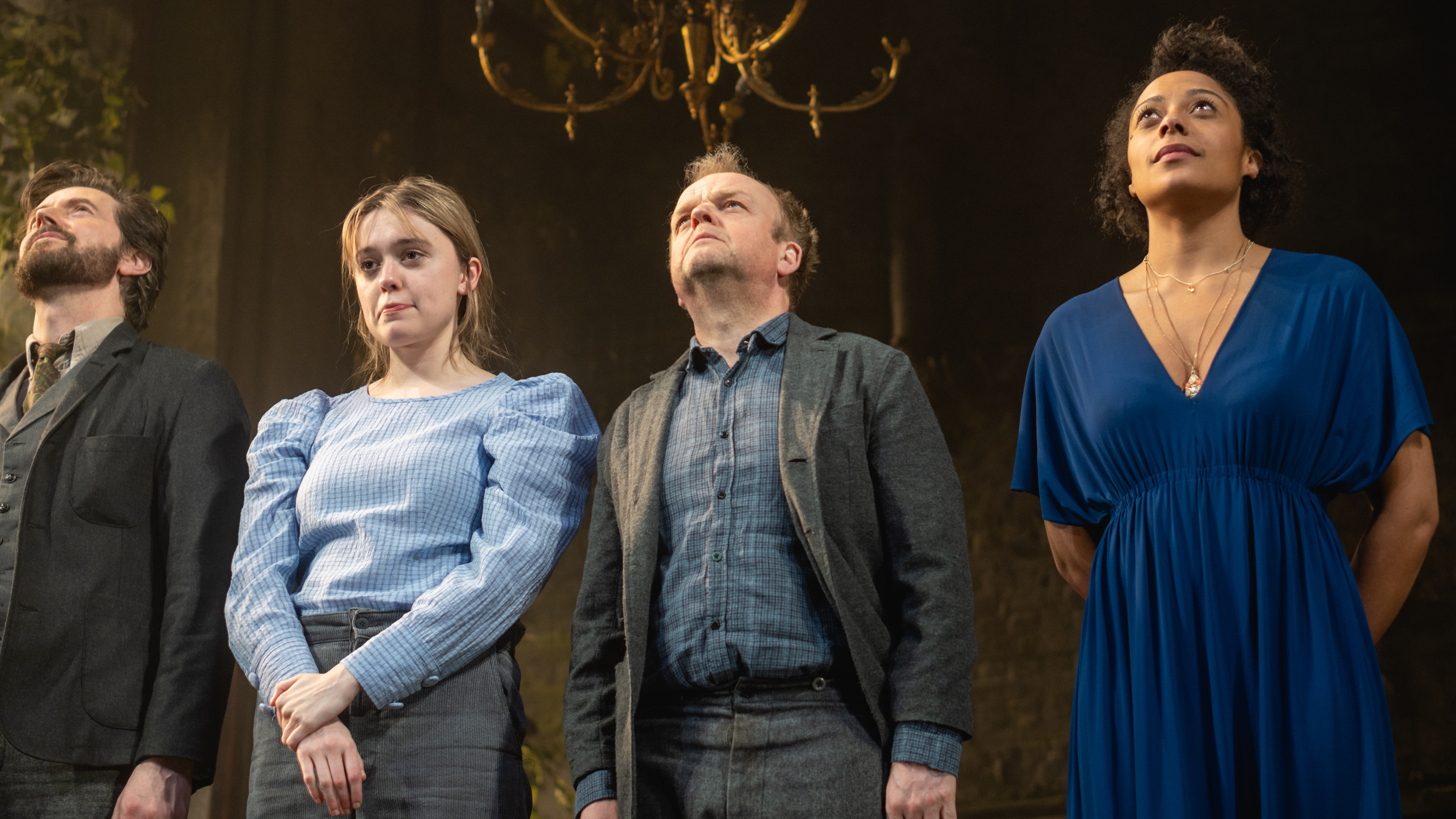
Cast at the Harold Pinter Theatre, 2020: Richard Armitage (Astrov), Aimee Lou Wood (Sonya), Toby Jones (Vanya), Rosalind Eleazar (Yelena)

- Aleksandr Vladimirovich Serebryakov (Alexandre; Алекса́ндр Влади́мирович Серебряко́в): a retired university professor, who has lived for years in the city on the earnings of his late first wife's rural estate, managed for him by Vanya and Sonya.
- Yelena Andreyevna Serebryakova (Hélène; Еле́на Андре́евна Серебряко́ва): Serebryakov's young and beautiful second wife. She is 27 years old.
- Sofia Alexandrovna Serebryakova (Sonya, Sophie; Со́фья Алекса́ндровна Серебряко́ва): Serebryakov's daughter from his first marriage. She is of a marriageable age, but is considered plain.
- Maria Vasilyevna Voynitskaya (Мари́я Васи́льевна Войни́цкая): the widow of a privy councillor and mother of Vanya (and of Vanya's late sister, Serebryakov's first wife).
- Ivan Petrovich Voynitsky (Uncle Vanya, Jean; Ива́н Петро́вич Войни́цкий): Maria's son and Sonya's uncle, also brother-in-law of Serebryakov, he is the title character of the play. He is 47 years old.
- Mikhail Lvovich Astrov (Михаи́л Льво́вич А́стров): a middle-aged country doctor. His preoccupation with the destruction of forests is one of the earlier discussions of ecological problems in world literature.
- Ilya Ilych Telegin (Илья́ Ильи́ч Теле́гин; nicknamed "Waffles" for his pockmarked skin — in Russian вафля, vaflya, 'waffle'): an impoverished landowner, who now lives on the estate as a dependent of the family.
- Marina Timofeevna (Мари́на Тимофе́евна): an old nurse.

Notable casts

Character	Rostov-on-Don (1897)	Broadway revival (1946)	Broadway revival (1973)	Broadway revival (2000)	West End revival (2002)	Off-Broadway revival (2009)	Sydney Theatre Company (2010)	Broadway revival (2024)
Uncle Vanya	Ivan Mikhailovich Shuvalov	Ralph Richardson	Nicol Williamson	Derek Jacobi	Simon Russell Beale	Reed Birney	Richard Roxburgh	Steve Carell
Yelena	Maria Aleksandrovna Yuryeva	Margaret Leighton	Julie Christie	Laura Linney	Helen McCrory	Maggie Gyllenhaal	Cate Blanchett	Anika Noni Rose
Sonya	Tatyana Fyodorovna Sinelnikova	Joyce Redman	Elizabeth Wilson	Amy Ryan	Emily Watson	Mamie Gummer	Hayley McElhinney	Alison Pill
Astrov	Pavel Vasilyevich Samoylov	Laurence Olivier	George C. Scott	Roger Rees	Mark Strong	Peter Sarsgaard	Hugo Weaving	William Jackson Harper
Professor Serebryakov	Dmitry Glyuske-Dobrovolsky	Nicholas Hannen	Barnard Hughes	Frank Langella	David Bradley	Denis O'Hare	John Bell	Alfred Molina
Maria	Unknown	Bryony Chapman	Cathleen Nesbitt	Rita Gam	Selina Cadell	Marin Ireland	Sandy Gore	Jayne Houdyshell
Marina	Maria Blumenthal-Tamarina	Ena Burrill	Lillian Gish	Rosemary Murphy	Cherry Morris	Cyrilla Baer	Jacki Weaver	Mia Katigbak
Telegin (Waffles)	Andrey Petrovsky	George Relph	Conrad Bain	David Patrick Kelly	Anthony O'Donnell	George Morfogen	Anthony Phelan	Jonathan Hadary

- In 2023 Andrew Scott starred in a one-man West End adaptation entitled Vanya. (Note: Scott starred in the one-man adaptation created by Simon Stephens, Sam Yates, Rosanna Vize and Scott himself. Victoria Blunt understudied.)
- Uncle Vanya has been produced on Broadway ten times from 1924 to 2024.

== Plot ==
=== Act I ===
At Professor Serebryakov's country estate, Astrov and Marina discuss how old Astrov has grown and his boredom with life as a country doctor. Vanya enters and complains of the disruption caused by the visit of Serebryakov and his wife, Yelena. Serebryakov, Yelena, Sonya, and Telegin return from a walk. Out of earshot of Serebryakov, Vanya calls him "a learned old dried mackerel" and belittles his achievements. Vanya's mother, Maria Vasilyevna, who idolizes Serebryakov, objects. Vanya also praises Yelena's beauty, arguing that faithfulness to an old man like Serebryakov is an immoral waste of vitality.

Astrov is forced to depart to attend to a patient, after making a speech on the preservation of the forests, a subject he is passionate about. Vanya declares his love to an exasperated Yelena.

=== Act II ===
Several days later. Before going to bed, Serebryakov complains of pain and old age. Astrov arrives but the professor refuses to see him. After Serebryakov falls asleep, Yelena and Vanya talk. She speaks of the discord in the house, and Vanya speaks of dashed hopes. He feels that he has misspent his youth and he associates his unrequited love for Yelena with the disappointment of his life. Yelena refuses to listen. Vanya believed in Serebryakov's greatness and was happy to support Serebryakov's work; he has become disillusioned with the professor and his life feels empty. Astrov returns and the two talk. Sonya chides Vanya for his drinking, and points out that only work is truly fulfilling.

A storm starts and Astrov talks to Sonya about the house's suffocating atmosphere; he says Serebryakov is difficult, Vanya is a hypochondriac, and Yelena is charming but idle. Sonya begs Astrov to stop drinking, telling him it is unworthy of him. It becomes clear that Sonya is in love with him and that he is unaware of her feelings.

Astrov leaves; Yelena enters and makes peace with Sonya, after mutual antagonism. Yelena reassures Sonya that she had strong feelings for Serebryakov when she married him, though that has proved illusory. Yelena confesses her unhappiness, and Sonya eulogises Astrov. In a happy mood, Sonya goes to ask the professor if Yelena may play the piano. Sonya returns with his negative answer.

=== Act III ===
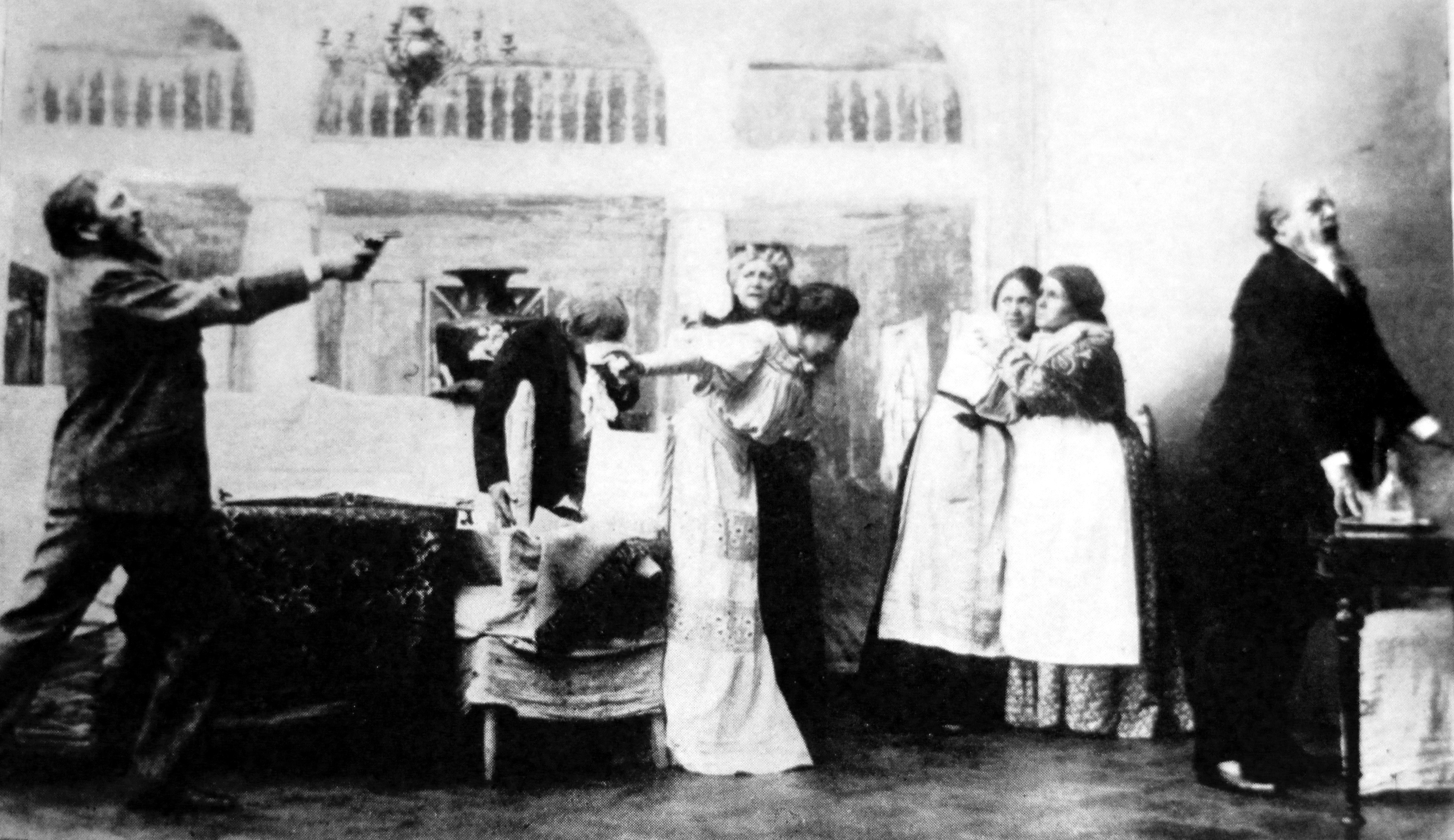
Uncle Vanya at the Moscow Art Theatre (1899), Act III

Vanya, Sonya, and Yelena have been called together by Serebryakov. Vanya urges Yelena, once again, to break free. Sonya complains to Yelena that she has loved Astrov for years but he does not notice her. Yelena volunteers to question Astrov and find out if he is in love with Sonya. Sonya is pleased, but wonders whether uncertainty is better than knowledge.

When Yelena asks Astrov about his feelings for Sonya, he says he has none, thinking that Yelena has brought up the subject of love to encourage him to confess his own feelings for her. Astrov kisses Yelena, and Vanya sees them. Upset, Yelena begs Vanya to use his influence to allow her and the professor to leave immediately. Yelena tells Sonya that Astrov does not love her.

Serebryakov proposes to solve the family's financial problems by selling the estate and investing the proceeds, which will bring in a significantly higher income (and, he hopes, leave enough over to buy a villa for himself and Yelena in Finland). Angrily, Vanya asks where he, Sonya, and his mother would live, protests that the estate rightly belongs to Sonya, and that Serebryakov has never appreciated his self-sacrifice in managing the property. Vanya begins to rage against the professor, blaming him for his own failures, wildly claiming that, without Serebryakov to hold him back, he could have been a second Schopenhauer or Dostoevsky. He cries out to his mother, but Maria insists that Vanya listen to the professor. Serebryakov insults Vanya, who storms out. Yelena begs to be taken away, and Sonya pleads with her father on Vanya's behalf. Serebryakov exits to confront Vanya further. A shot is heard from offstage and Serebryakov returns, chased by Vanya, wielding a pistol. He fires again at the professor, but misses. He throws the gun down in self-disgust.

=== Act IV ===
A few hours later, Marina and Telegin discuss the planned departure of Serebryakov and Yelena. Vanya and Astrov enter, Astrov saying that in this district, only he and Vanya were "decent, cultured men" and that years of "narrow-minded life" have made them vulgar. Vanya has stolen a vial of Astrov's morphine, presumably to commit suicide; Sonya and Astrov beg him to return it, which he eventually does.

Yelena and Serebryakov bid farewell. When Yelena says goodbye to Astrov, she embraces him, and takes one of his pencils as a souvenir. Serebryakov and Vanya make their peace, agreeing all will be as it was before. Once the outsiders have departed, Sonya and Vanya settle accounts, Maria reads a pamphlet, and Marina knits. Vanya complains of the heaviness of his heart, and Sonya, in response, speaks of living, working, and the rewards of the afterlife: "And our life will grow peaceful, tender, sweet as a caress…. You've had no joy in your life; but wait, Uncle Vanya, wait…. We shall rest."

== Productions ==
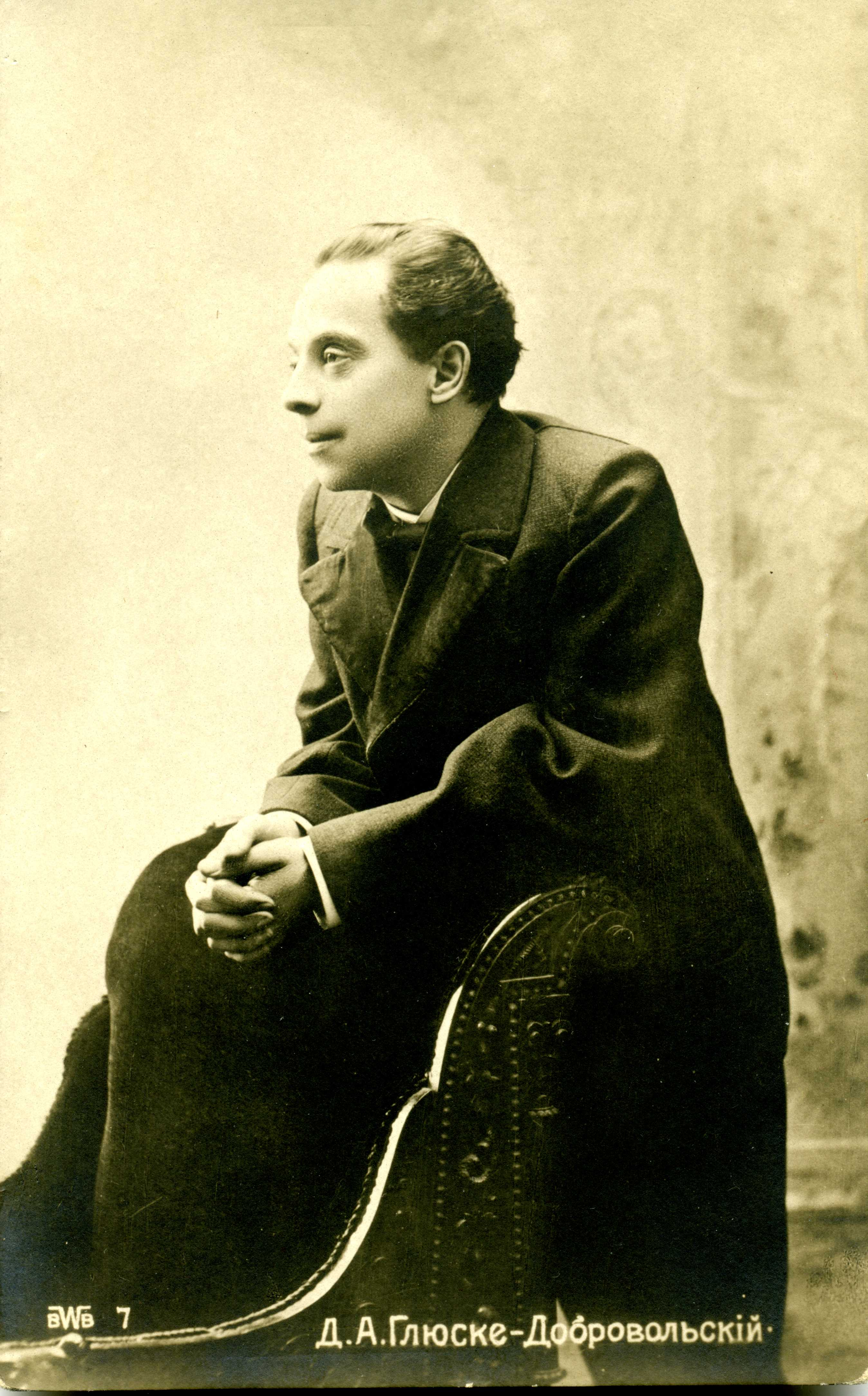
Dmitry Glyuske-Dobrovolsky played Professor Serebryakov in the 1897 Rostov production.

Plays were often performed without permission in Russia at the time; Nikolai Sinelnikov records in his autobiography that he bought a copy in 1897 and staged it in Rostov-on-Don with friends, which was probably the first public performance of Uncle Vanya.

Although the play had previous small runs in provincial theatres in 1898, its metropolitan première took place on 7 November [O.S. 26 October] 1899 at the Moscow Art Theatre. Constantin Stanislavski played the role of Astrov while Chekhov's future wife Olga Knipper played Yelena. The initial reviews were favorable but pointed to defects in both the play and the performances. As the staging and the acting improved over successive performances, and as "the public understood better its inner meaning and nuances of feeling", the reviews improved. Uncle Vanya became a permanent fixture in the Moscow Art Theatre.

In 1921, Georges Pitoëff directed a French-language production in Geneva and at the Comédie des Champs-Élysées in Paris, starring Ludmilla Pitoëff as Sonya.

In 1955, Luchino Visconti directed a production at the Teatro Eliseo in Rome, starring Marcello Mastroianni as Astrov.

In 1972, Jacques Mauclair directed a production at the Comédie-Française in Paris, starring Michel Aumont as Vanya.

In 1986, Eimuntas Nekrošius directed a production for the State Youth Theatre of Lithuania in Vilnius, starring Vladas Bagdonas as Vanya.

In 1993, Luc Bondy directed a production at the Odéon-Théâtre de l'Europe in Paris, starring Michel Piccoli as Vanya.

In 1996, Ludwik Margules directed a production at El Foro. Teatro Contemporáneo in Mexico City, featuring Yael Michal as Yelena.

In 1998, Lev Dodin directed a production for the Maly Drama Theatre in Saint Petersburg, starring Sergei Kuryshev as Vanya.

The play was adapted as the stage-play Dear Uncle by the British playwright Alan Ayckbourn, who reset it in the 1930s Lake District. This adaptation premiered from July to September 2011 at the Stephen Joseph Theatre.

In January 2014 24/6: A Jewish Theater Company performed TuBishVanya, a modern adaptation that incorporated Jewish and environmental themes.

In 2023, an off-off-Broadway production of Uncle Vanya performed in an unmarked Manhattan loft for an audience of 40. Directed by Jack Serio and using a translation by Paul Schmidt, the cast featured Will Brill as Astrov, Julia Chan as Yelena, David Cromer as Vanya, Will Dagger as Telegin, Marin Ireland as Sonya, Bill Irwin as Serebryakov (replaced by Thomas Jay Ryan), Virginia Wing as Marina, Ann McDonough as Maria, and Nathan Malin as Yefim.

In April 2024, a Broadway production of Uncle Vanya was staged in the Vivian Beaumont Theater adapted by Heidi Schreck and directed by Lila Neugebauer. The cast included Steve Carell as Uncle Vanya, Allison Pill as Sonya, William Jackson Harper as Astrov, Alfred Molina as Alexander Serabryakov, Anika Noni Rose as Yelena, Jonathan Hadary as Telegin/"Waffles," Jayne Houdyshell as Mama Voinitski, and Mia Katigbak as Marina. For his performance as Astrov, Harper earned a nomination for the Tony Award for Best Actor in a Play.

In 2025, Berkeley Repertory Theatre, in conjunction with the Shakespeare Theatre Company, staged a new production with a translation by Conor McPherson, directed by Simon Godwin, with Hugh Bonneville as Uncle Vanya, Nancy Robinette as Marina Timofeevna, John Benjamin Hickey as Mikhail Astrov, Sharon Lockwood as Mariya Voinitsky, Tom Nelis as Aleksandr Serebryakov, Craig Wallace as Telegin/Waffles, Melanie Field as Sofya Aleksandrovna, and Ito Aghayere as Elena Andreevna.

Among the actors who have played Uncle Vanya on Broadway are Ralph Richardson, Nicol Williamson, Tom Courtenay, and Derek Jacobi. Other actors who have appeared in notable stage productions of Uncle Vanya include Michael Redgrave, Paul Scofield, Peter O'Toole, Albert Finney, Franchot Tone, Cate Blanchett, Peter Dinklage, Jacki Weaver, Antony Sher, Ian McKellen, Richard Armitage, Simon Russell Beale, William Hurt, George C. Scott, Donald Sinden, Michael Gambon, Trevor Eve, and Laurence Olivier.

=== Parodies ===
- The Fifth Elephant, a 1999 novel by Terry Pratchett, includes a pastiche of Chekhov plays in which "the gloomy and purposeless trousers of Uncle Vanya" are loaned to Captain Vimes.
- Life Sucks: Or the Present Ridiculous, a 2015 stage adaptation by Aaron Posner, premiered at Theater J in Washington, D.C.

== Other adaptations ==
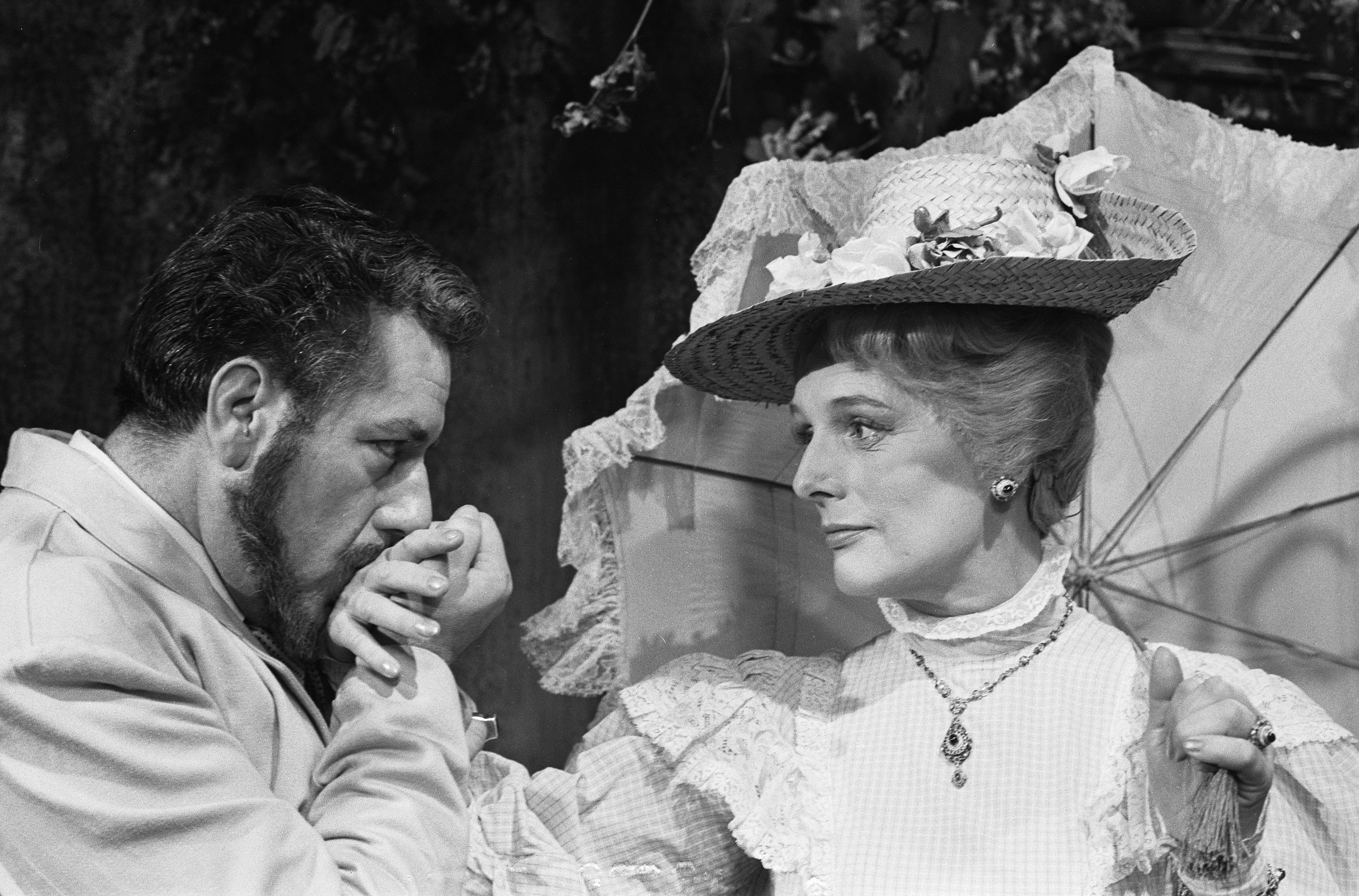
Dutch TV version, 1961: Ko van Dijk as Vanya and Ank van der Moer as Yelena

Over the years, Uncle Vanya has been adapted for screen several times.

- Uncle Vanya, a 1957 adaptation of a concurrent Off-Broadway production that starred Franchot Tone, who co-produced and co-directed the film
- Uncle Vanya, a version of the star-studded 1962–63 Chichester Festival stage production, directed for the stage by Laurence Olivier, who played Astrov, and also starring Michael Redgrave as Vanya, Max Adrian as Professor Serebryakov, Rosemary Harris as Yelena, and Olivier's wife Joan Plowright as Sonya. Harold Hobson of The Sunday Times described the Chichester production as "the admitted master achievement in British twentieth-century theatre" while The New Yorker called it "probably the best 'Vanya' in English we shall ever see".
- Uncle Vanya, a 1970 Russian film version, adapted and directed by Andrei Mikhalkov-Konchalovsky, with Sergei Bondarchuk, the director and one of the stars of the multipart Mosfilm War and Peace, as Astrov
- Uncle Vanya, a 1991 episode of the BBC Performance anthology for TV, starring Ian Holm and David Warner
- Vanya on 42nd Street, a 1994 American film version, adapted by David Mamet and directed by Louis Malle. It stars Wallace Shawn and Julianne Moore. Originally a little-known studio production, it was adapted for the screen, where it garnered wider acclaim.
- Country Life, a 1994 Australian adaptation, set in the Outback, starring Sam Neill as the equivalent of Astrov
- August, a 1996 English film adaptation, set in Wales, directed by and starring Anthony Hopkins in the Vanya role. Hopkins played Astrov in a BBC Play of the Month production in 1970.
- A Weekend in the Galilee, a 2007 Israeli film drama directed by Moshé Mizrahi and loosely based on Uncle Vanya.
- Sonya's Story, an opera adapted by director Sally Burgess, composer Neal Thornton and designer Charles Phu, portraying events in the play Uncle Vanya from the character Sonya's perspective, premiered in 2010.
- Uncle Vanya, a 2012 adaptation by Annie Baker premiered at Soho Repertory Theatre on June 7. It was directed by Sam Gold, starred Reed Birney as Vanya, and closed on July 22. Working closely with a Russian translator, Baker created her own original and contemporary adaptation of the play.
- Chekhov: Fast & Furious, a multimedia theatric performance project by the Franco-Austrian performance collective Superamas which translates the themes of the "old" theatre into our time, premiered in 2018 at the Vienna Festival in Austria.
- Uncle Vanya, a recording of the interrupted 2020 run at London's Harold Pinter Theatre, adapted by Conor McPherson, starring Aimee Lou Wood, Rosalind Eleazar, Roger Allam, Toby Jones, and Richard Armitage. Due to the government's COVID-19 restrictions, it was decided to bring the cast back under guidelines and film the play for release in cinemas and later on the BBC.
- Drive My Car, a 2021 film by Ryusuke Hamaguchi, includes a production of Uncle Vanya, with the characters echoing the emotional turmoil of Chekhov's characters as they reveal their trauma and deeply complicated feelings. It is based on a short story collection by Haruki Murakami.
- Vanya, a one-man adaptation for the stage starring Andrew Scott and directed by Sam Yates, had its West End debut in September 2023. It was co-created by Simon Stephens, Sam Yates, Rosanna Vize and Scott himself. The production won best revival at the 2024 Laurence Olivier Awards and Scott was nominated for his performance. A filmed recording was released in cinemas through National Theatre Live in February 2024. It will open in New York on 11th March 2025 at the Lucille Lortel Theatre.
- Ványa bácsi – Buborékkeringő (Uncle Vanya – Bubble waltz), a 2025 adaptation by Kun-Béres Anikó and Somogyi György premiered on 22 January. It was directed by Péter Fazakas, edited by Zoltán Kovács.
- April 2023: Schauspiel Dortmund - Dortmund Drama Theater.

Playwright from FRG Marie Senf wrote her Uncle Vanya. Dramaturgy Marie Senf. Direction and video design Rikki Henry. The cast: Alexander Wladímirowitsch Serebrjaków; Linus Ebner; Jeléna (Elena) Andréjewna: Sarah Quarshie; Iwán Petrówitsch Wojnízkij, genannt „Onkel Wanja": Ekkehard Freye; Sofja Alexándrowna (Sonja): Nika Mišković; Michaíl Lwówitsch Ástrow: Alexander Darkow; María Wassíljewna: Antje Prust; Iljá Iljítsch Telégin: Adi Hrustemović; Marína: Nina Karimy;

== Awards and nominations ==
=== 1992 West End production ===
Year	Award	Category	Nominee	Result	Ref.
1992	Laurence Olivier Awards	Best Revival		Nominated	
1992	Laurence Olivier Awards	Best Actor	Ian McKellen	Nominated	
1992	Laurence Olivier Awards	Best Actress	Janet McTeer	Nominated	
1992	Laurence Olivier Awards	Best Actress in a Supporting Role	Lesley Sharp	Nominated	
1992	Laurence Olivier Awards	Best Director of a Play	Sean Mathias	Nominated	

=== 2000 Broadway production ===
Year	Award	Category	Nominee	Result	Ref.
2000	Tony Awards	Best Featured Actress in a Play	Amy Ryan	Nominated	
2000	Tony Awards	Best Scenic Design	Tony Walton	Nominated	
2000	Drama Desk Award	Outstanding Revival of a Play		Nominated	
2000	Drama Desk Award	Outstanding Actor in a Play	Derek Jacobi	Nominated	
2000	Drama Desk Award	Outstanding Featured Actor in a Play	Brian Murray	Nominated	
2000	Drama Desk Award	Outstanding Direction of a Play	Michael Mayer	Nominated	
2000	Drama Desk Award	Outstanding Set Design of a Play	Tony Walton	Nominated	
2000	Drama League Award	Distinguished Production of a Revival		Nominated	
2000	Outer Critics Circle Award	Outstanding Revival of a Play		Nominated	
2000	Outer Critics Circle Award	Outstanding Actor in a Play	Derek Jacobi	Won	
2000	Outer Critics Circle Award	Outstanding Actress in a Play	Laura Linney	Nominated	

=== 2003 West End production ===
Year	Award	Category	Nominee	Result	Ref.
2003	Laurence Olivier Award	Best Revival		Won	
2003	Laurence Olivier Award	Best Actor	Simon Russell Beale	Won	
2003	Laurence Olivier Award	Best Actress	Emily Watson	Nominated	
2003	Laurence Olivier Award	Best Director	Sam Mendes	Nominated	

=== 2024 West End production ===
Year	Award	Category	Nominee	Result	Ref.
2023	Evening Standard Theatre Awards	Best Actor	Andrew Scott	Won	
2024	Laurence Olivier Awards	Best Revival		Won	
2024	Laurence Olivier Awards	Best Actor	Andrew Scott	Nominated	
2024	Critics' Circle Theatre Awards	Best Actor	Andrew Scott	Won	
2024	WhatsOnStage Awards	Best Play Revival		Won	
2024	WhatsOnStage Awards	Best Performer in a Play	Andrew Scott	Nominated	

=== 2024 Broadway production ===
Year	Award	Category	Nominee	Result	Ref.
2024	Drama League Awards	Outstanding Revival of a Play		Nominated	
2024	Drama League Awards	Distinguished Performance	Steve Carell	Nominated	
2024	Drama League Awards	Distinguished Performance	William Jackson Harper	Nominated	
2024	Drama League Awards	Outstanding Direction of a Play	Lila Neugebauer	Nominated	
2024	Tony Award	Best Actor in a Play	William Jackson Harper	Nominated	

== See also ==
- Chekhov's gun
