= Walter Wilson (rugby union) =

British Army officer & England rugby union player (1885–1968)

Walter Wilson DSO OBE MC
- Full name: Walter Carandini Wilson
- Born: 22 June 1885 Brisbane, Australia
- Died: 12 April 1968 (aged 82) Brighton, England
- School: Tonbridge School
- Notable relative(s): Marie Carandini (grandmother); Christopher Lee (cousin)

Rugby union career
- Position: Wing
International career
Years	Team	Apps	(Points)
1907	England	2	(0)

Lieutenant colonel Walter Carandini Wilson (22 June 1885 – 12 April 1968) was an Australian-born British Army officer and England international rugby union player.

Born in Brisbane, Queensland, Wilson was the grandson of an Italian nobleman (the Marquis of Sarzano) and opera singer Marie Carandini, who were the parents of his mother. His father, Robert Walker Wilson, was Scottish. He moved to England during his childhood and was educated at Tonbridge School in Kent.

Wilson received his commission in the Royal Warwickshire Regiment in 1905 and two years later joined the Leicestershire Regiment. During this period, Wilson played rugby in the army and was capped twice for England as a wing three-quarter in the 1907 Home Nations, against Ireland and Scotland. He was promoted to lieutenant in 1908 and then captain while on secondment to the West African Regiment in 1913.

In World War I, Wilson served with the Leicestershire Regiment and was badly wounded during an attack on a German position, but continued to lead his soldiers over the enemy parapet before getting treatment, for which he was made a Companion of the Distinguished Service Order. He was later awarded a Military Cross and OBE.

Wilson was a cousin of actor Christopher Lee.

== See also ==
- List of England national rugby union players
