= Sally Burgess =

British operatic mezzo-soprano

Sally Burgess FRCM (born 9 October 1953) is a South African-born British operatic lyric mezzo-soprano, opera director, and educator. She has been a Fellow and Professor of Vocal Studies at the Royal College of Music since 2004, as well as teaching stagecraft. She has also taught at the Guildhall School of Music & Drama in London.

== Biography and career ==
Born in South Africa, Burgess studied at the Royal College of Music in London with Marion Studholme and Josephine Veasey. She made her debut on the opera stage as Zerlina in Don Giovanni with English National Opera. The ENO gave her a solo contract when she was only 23, and during her career she has sung over 40 roles with the company. Amongst the other companies where has appeared are: the Royal Opera House, Covent Garden where she made her debut as Siebel in Faust with Alfredo Kraus, the Metropolitan Opera, the Bavarian State Opera in Munich, the Grand Théâtre de Genève, Switzerland as Fricka in Der Ring des Nibelungen, Houston Grand Opera as Polinesso in Ariodante, and the Opéra Bastille in Paris in the title role of Carmen. A critic for The Sunday Times described her as "the greatest exponent of Carmen I have ever seen". Carmen is a role with which she has a particular affinity and is one she has sung all over the world. Her other roles include Azucena in Il trovatore, Amneris in Aida, Hanna Glawari in The Merry Widow, Judith in Bluebeard's Castle, Kabanicha in Káťa Kabanová, Ottavia in L'incoronazione di Poppea, Delilah in Samson and Delilah, and Herodias in Salome.

Burgess appears on many recordings including several with Chandos Records (Judith in Bluebeard's Castle Herodias in Salome, Florence Pike in Albert Herring, and the Sorceress Dido and Aeneas); Paul McCartney's Liverpool Oratorio, and three jazz albums.

She made her opera directing debut in 2009 with Mozart's Così fan tutte for English Chamber Opera at Buxton and in London and also works with singers on the Jette Parker Young Artists Programme at the Royal Opera House, Les Azuriales Opera Festival's Young Artists Programme, young artists programmes in Moscow, and British Youth Opera. In August 2010, she directed the world premiere of Sonya's Story in collaboration with set designer Charles Phu. The opera, adapted from Anton Chekhov's Uncle Vanya, was composed by Neal Thornton.

She has also sung in non-operatic roles, such as Delius's Songs of Sunset and Constant Lambert's The Rio Grande with the pianist Jack Gibbons.
