= Wargrave War Memorial =

War memorial in Berkshire, South East England

- United Kingdom
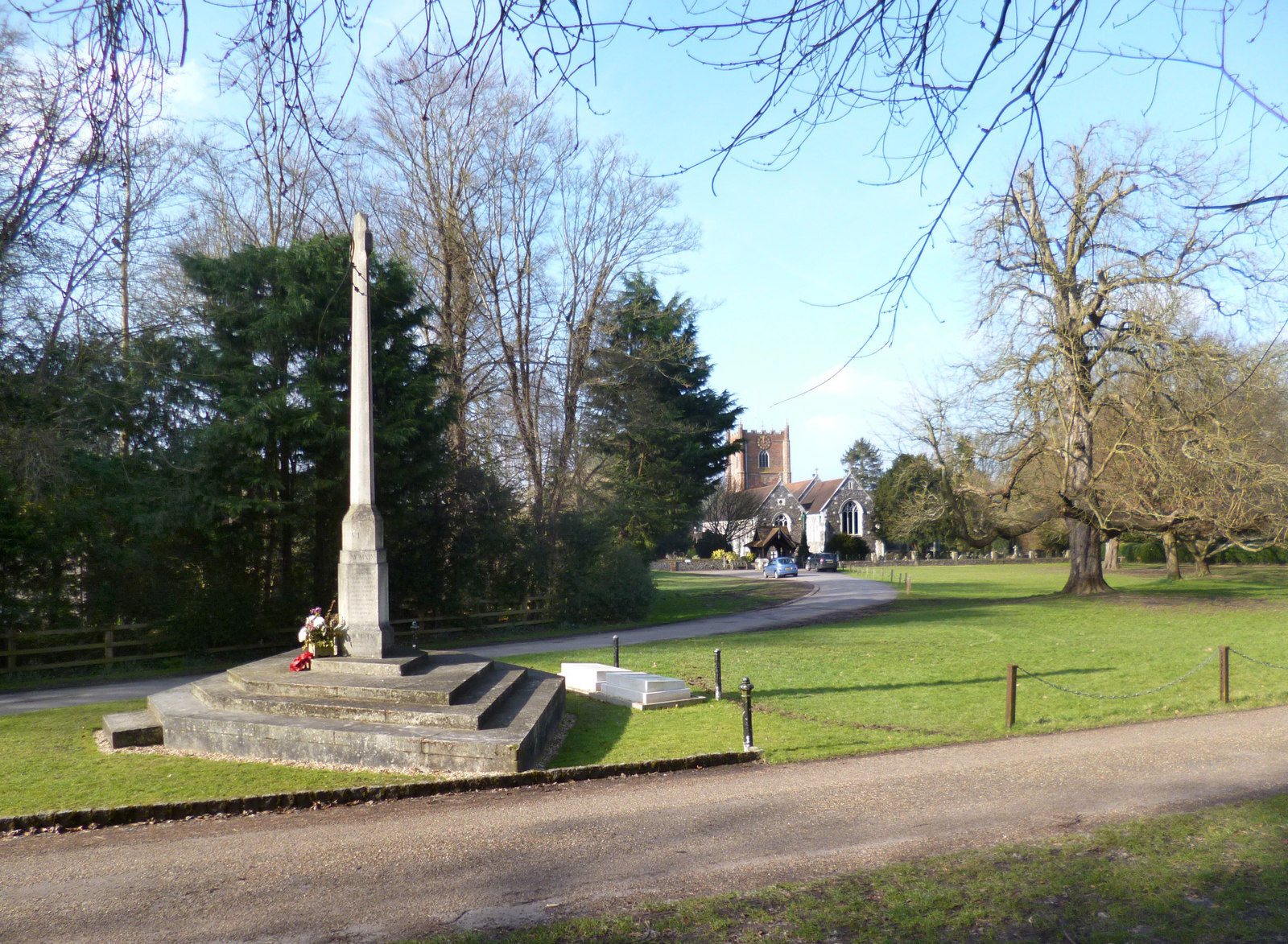
- For men from Wargrave killed in the First World War
- Unveiled: 28 May 1922
- Location: 51.4993884°N 0.8726687°W; Wargrave, Berkshire near Reading
- Designed by: Sir Edwin Lutyens

Listed Building – Grade II
- Official name: Wargrave War Memorial
- Designated: 23 December 1983
- Reference no.: 1319107

Wargrave War Memorial is First World War memorial in the village of Wargrave (near Reading) in Berkshire, south-eastern England. Designed by Sir Edwin Lutyens, the memorial was unveiled in 1922 and is today a grade II listed building.

== Background ==
In the aftermath of the First World War and its unprecedented casualties, thousands of war memorials were built across Britain. Amongst the most prominent designers of memorials was the architect Sir Edwin Lutyens, described by Historic England as "the leading English architect of his generation". Lutyens designed the Cenotaph on Whitehall in London, which became the focus for the national Remembrance Sunday commemorations, as well as the Thiepval Memorial to the Missing—the largest British war memorial anywhere in the world—and the Stone of Remembrance which appears in all large Commonwealth War Graves Commission cemeteries and in several of Lutyens's civic war memorials. Wargrave's memorial is one of fifteen War Crosses by Lutyens, all sharing a broadly similar design.

Prior to the outbreak of the First World War, Lutyens established his reputation by designing country houses for wealthy clients. Many of Lutyens' commissions for war memorials originated with pre-war friends and clients. His connection with Wargrave apparently came from the Hannen family—Nicholas "Beau" Hannen worked as an apprenticeship in Lutyens' office between 1902 and 1905, and Lutyens designed the Hannen Columbarium for the family in 1905, which stands in Wargrave churchyard.

== History and design ==
A public meeting in Wargrave, held on 13 October 1919, agreed to commission Lutyens to design a War Cross for the village, and to fund a bed for the Royal Berkshire Hospital, subject to sufficient funding. A target of £600 was set, of which £500 was raised within eight months of the meeting and a Henry Bond donated a piece of land on the village green, which the committee and Lutyens agreed was a suitable location during a site visit by the architect. Lutyens prepared designs by August 1920, which were approved at a further meeting in November of the same year.

The memorial stand on the village green, towards the southern end. It follows Lutyens' War Cross design as a single cross in Portland stone with a long, tapering shaft to which the short arms are moulded close to the top. Uniquely among Lutyens' War Crosses, it has a hexagonal, rather than rectangular, profile, which continues down the shaft and through the plinth. The whole memorials sits on a base of four stone steps (also hexagonal, on the same alignment), of which the lowest is much deeper than the others, with a single stone block serving as a step at the front. The unusual shape led Tim Skelton, author of Lutyens and the Great War (2008) to describe Wargrave as "the most distinguished of all of Lutyens' War Crosses". The plinth contains the inscriptions "WARGRAVE / MCMXIV MCMXIX / MCMXXXIX MXMXLV" and "HER GLORIOUS DEAD / MCMXIV MCMXIX / MCMXXXIX MXMXLV" on the south (front) and north (rear) faces, respectively. The names of the fallen are inscribed around the plinth. As these became worn, they were supplemented by two stone tablets set into the grass in front of the cross, which also contain several additional names.

The memorials was unveiled by Field Marshal Sir William Robertson on 28 May 1922 and dedicated by Hubert Burge, the Bishop of Oxford.

Wargrave War Memorial was designated a grade II listed building on 23 December 1983. In November 2015, as part of the commemorations of the centenary of the First World War, Lutyens's war memorials were recognised as a "national collection" and all of his free-standing memorials in England were listed or had their listing status reviewed and their National Heritage List for England list entries were updated and expanded.
