= War and Love =

War and Love may refer to:

- War and Love (1985 film), American film
- War and Love (2003 film), Indian Malayalam-language film
