= Rosina Palmer =

Australian opera singer (1844–1932)

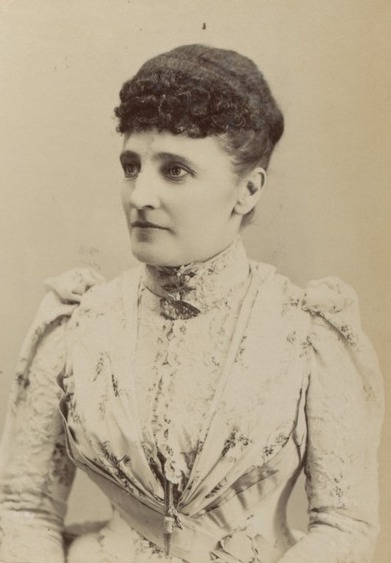
- Palmer from a photograph album compiled in 1965. (State Library Victoria, c. 1870 – c. 1900, p. 23)
- Born: Rosina Martha Carandini; 27 August 1844; Hobart, Tasmania, Australia
- Died: 16 June 1932 (aged 87); South Yarra, Melbourne, Australia
- Occupations: Opera singer; singing teacher
- Spouse: Edward Hodson Palmer (m. 1880)
- Mother: Marie Carandini

Rosina Martha Hosanah Palmer (née Carandini; 27 August 1844 – 16 June 1932) was an Australian opera singer, who often appeared as Mrs Palmer. Born in Hobart, Tasmania, she developed a soprano voice early on and accompanied her mother, opera singer Marie Carandini, on tours, singing with her family troupe. Palmer moved to Melbourne with her husband in 1866. Although she had a low income, she later became a successful singing teacher. Musicologist Thérèse Radic wrote that, despite being gifted, Palmer was constrained by her social position as a married woman, as was typical of her contemporaries.

== Biography ==
=== Early life and career ===
Rosina Martha Carandini was born on 27 August 1844 in Hobart, Tasmania, Australia. She was the eldest of the five daughters of Jerome Carandini, Marquis of Sarzano, and Marie Carandini née Burgess. As her father had no money, the family was dependent on their mother's career as an opera singer. Educated in Sydney and Melbourne, Rosina showed early promise in piano and placed first in school pianoforte competitions. Under the tuition of Frederick Augustus Packer, she developed a soprano voice. Her debut appearance was at St. Joseph's Cathedral in Hobart.

Rosina appeared in the opera Norma as Adalgisa when she was fourteen, in which her mother played the title character. This role fuelled her mother's ambitions for her and she afterwards encouraged her only in singing.

Rosina married Edward Hodson Palmer on 8 November 1860, with whom she would have eight children. Her husband was a cashier who later worked as an accountant in the Bank of Australasia. She initially had no interest pursuing a career in music and only appeared at charity concerts, but as Mrs Palmer joined her mother's concert company on an extended tour of Australia, New Zealand, India and the United States as "circumstances [rendered] it necessary". Four of her sisters joined in later years and they were known as the Carandini Family Troupe, until their father's death led to their mother abandoning the European tour in 1870.

=== Career in Melbourne ===
When Palmer and her husband moved to Melbourne in 1866, she continued her career as a singer, but did concerts in major cities instead of tours and was an oratorio singer. Palmer sang solo parts with low pay in the Melbourne Philharmonic Society and the Liedertafels, as it was then considered improper for a married woman to appear on an opera stage. When Alfred, Duke of Edinburgh, visited Melbourne he was impressed by Palmer's performance and promised to provide her musical education, but this did not eventuate.

Palmer joined a traveling quartet as soprano with Armes Beaumont, S. Lamble and Mrs Cutter in 1872 and they toured Australia and visited New Zealand. She and Beaumont were also the main singers in a series of concerts at the Royal Exhibition Building and she was a soloist on the Scots' Church choir from 1880 to 1910. Although her income was small, she was able to continue singing because her husband's was slightly larger.

=== Later career and death ===
Palmer later became a successful singing teacher and was praised by celebrities she sang with, such as Charles Santley. Although she visited the United States, she had to return to Melbourne as her mother had fallen ill. To her disappointment, Palmer also had to give up teaching some years before her death.

Her husband died on 28 June 1928, and Palmer herself died on 16 June 1932 in South Yarra. She was survived by a son and two daughters. In her entry for Palmer in the Australian Dictionary of Biography, musicologist Thérèse Radic said that although Palmer was undoubtedly gifted, like many of her contemporaries, her societal role as a married woman barred her from further development. Radic considered her mother, Caradini, as one of the few who could "break through the barricades of convention".

Caradini's niece was the writer Mary Gaunt. One of her daughters, Emmeline Ida Louise Palmer, married Gilbert Wilson and moved to Brisbane in 1882. She became a soprano and was held in high esteem as "one of Brisbane's leading singers and [singing] teachers" at the height of her career.
