= The Iron Duchess =

1957 play

- Original language: English
- Written by: William Douglas Home
- Genre: Comedy

Premiere
- Date: 25 February 1957
- Place: Theatre Royal, Brighton

The Iron Duchess is a 1957 comedy play by the British writer William Douglas Home.

It premiered at the Theatre Royal, Brighton before transferring to the Fortune Theatre in London's West End where it ran for 83 performances from the 14 March to 25 June 1957. The London cast featured Richard Pearson, Ronald Squire, Olaf Pooley, David Hutcheson, William Mervyn, Geoffrey Lumsden, Gladys Henson, Athene Seyler, Jane Downs and Rosamund Greenwood.

== Bibliography ==
- Wearing, J.P. The London Stage 1950-1959: A Calendar of Productions, Performers, and Personnel. Rowman & Littlefield, 2014.
