= Caro William =

Caro William is a play by William Douglas-Home which premiered at the Embassy Theatre in London in 1952. The cast included Robert Shaw as Mr. George Lamb, Rachel Gurney as Mrs. George Lamb and Freda Gaye as Lady Melbourne. This play was the London stage acting debut of Robert Shaw.
