= A Weekend in the Galilee =

- Hebrew: סוף שבוע בגליל
- Directed by: Moshé Mizrahi
- Written by: Anton Chekhov; Michal Bat-Adam; Moshé Mizrahi
- Produced by: Michal Bat-Adam; Moshé Mizrah
- Starring: Sharon Alexander; Hannah Maron; Yigal Sadeh; Oded Teomi; Shiri Gadni; Pini Tavger; Marina Shoif
- Cinematography: Amnon Zlayet
- Music by: Daniel Mizrahi
- Release date: 2007
- Running time: 104 minutes
- Country: Israel
- Language: Hebrew

A Weekend in the Galilee (Hebrew: סוף שבוע בגליל, romanized: Sof Shavua B'Galil) is a 2007 Israeli drama film directed by Moshé Mizrahi. The screenplay written by Mizrahi and his wife, Michal Bat-Adam. It is loosely based on the 1897 play, Uncle Vanya by Anton Chekhov. It was Mizrahi's final film before his death in 2018.

== Plot ==
In 1996, almost a year after the assassination of Yitzhak Rabin, a family gathers at their farm in the Galilee. Avner, a distinguished scholar and professor visits the farm with his second, younger wife, Ilana. Avner's children from his first marriage, Rachel and Shouki live on the farm with their grandmother and their late mother's brother, Menahem. Avner is beset by migraines and other pain during his visit, and the local doctor and friend of the family, Joel is called frequently. Joel and Ilana are conducting a secret affair, meanwhile Menahem is in love with Ilana and Rachel is in love with Joel. They are both unaware of the secret affair.

== Cast ==
- Sharon Alexander as Menahem, a farmer
- Hannah Maron as Mania, grandmother
- Yigal Sadeh as Joel, a local doctor and Ilana's lover
- Oded Teomi as Avner, an academic
- Shiri Gadni as Rachel, Avner's daughter
- Pini Tavger as Shouki, Avner's son
- Marina Shoif as Ilana, Avner's wife
- Adva Bolle as Yael
- Assaf Averbuch as Tomer

== Production ==
The film marked Mizrahi's first feature in 11 years, since Women (1996). Mizrahi had been teaching cinema at Tel Aviv University since the early 1990s, with his film projects facing financing and other issues.

== Release ==
The film was released in Israel in 2007, the following year it premiered at the 18th New York Jewish Film Festival.
