= Sonya's Story =

Sonya's Story is an opera by the British composer Neal Thornton to a libretto based on the original Russian text of Anton Chekhov's 1899 play Uncle Vanya. The libretto reproduces passages from Uncle Vanya in English translation with additional spoken text by Neal Thornton.

Sonya's Story premiered on 7 August 2010 at the Riverside Studios in London to celebrate Chekhov's 150th birthday. The production, part of the Tête à Tête festival was directed by Sally Burgess and designed by Charles Phu. The work was positively received, Jessica Duchen of The Independent noticing "no compromise on standards".

== Roles ==
Roles, voice types, premiere cast
Role	Voice type	Premiere cast, 7 August 2010 Conductor: Lionel Friend
Sofya Alexandrovna Serebryakov (Sonya), Professor Serebryakov's daughter from his first marriage	mezzo-soprano	Caryl Hughes
Ivan Petrovitch Voynitsky (Uncle Vanya), Sonya's uncle	baritone	Cozmin Sime
Mikhail Lvovich Astrov (Dr. Astrov), a country doctor	baritone	Cozmin Sime
Yelena Andreyevna Serebryakov (Yelena), Professor Serebryakov's second wife	actress/dancer	Ilana Gorban
