= The Bad Samaritan =

Play by William Douglas Home

The Bad Samaritan is a 1953 play by William Douglas Home. After a trial run at Bromley it was acquired by Alec L Rea & E P Clift's production company for West End theatre at Sir Bronson Albery's Criterion.

== Cast ==
- Michael Denison, Brian
- Heather Stannard, Jane
- Jessie Winter, Mrs Foster
- George Relph, The Dean
- Ronald Lewis, Alan
- Virginia McKenna, Veronica

== Plot ==
"The Bad Samaritan has at its heart distorted reiligious zeal."

Catholic Veronica's deliberate seduction of young Anglican, Alan, provokes his revulsion such that he becomes a celibate Catholic priest. The crisis develops at his parental home, an Anglican deanery in an English Cathedral town, with Alan's father radically opposed to Catholicism. The stage is set by the presence of Alan's brother Brian, a war-damaged agnostic, and Jane, his former lover.

Brian marries the pregnant and deserted Veronica. An epilogue set seven years later sees Veronica on holiday in Italy with her son. They visit a remote church where the priest is revealed as Alan, their reconciliation being a spiritual Kiss of Peace.

== Productions ==
The play ran for six months in London including the Criterion Theatre and the Duchess Theatre between April and October 1953.

Repertory productions ran at the Little Theatre, Bristol between 1953 and 1954; Colchester Repertory Theatre, 1954; Salisbury Playhouse January 1956 and the Palace Avenue Theatre, Paignton in July 1957.

In May 1954 the play was performed at the Grand Theatre, Wolverhampton with John Barron and Ursula O’Leary.

== Reception ==
A Times Review noted that the play used the Wilde formula with indifferent effect.

Variety felt it was "over flippant".
