= The Customer of the Off Season =

1970 film

- Original French film poster
- Directed by: Moshé Mizrahi
- Written by: Moshé Mizrahi; Rahel Fabian
- Produced by: Alex Massis
- Starring: Claude Rich
- Cinematography: Étienne Szabo
- Edited by: Dov Hoenig
- Release date: 1970
- Running time: 90 minutes
- Countries: Israel; France
- Language: Hebrew

The Customer of the Off Season (Hebrew: אורח בעונה מתה Ore'ach B'Onah Metah), (French: Le Client de la morte-saison) is a 1970 French-Israeli drama film directed and co-written by Moshé Mizrahi. This was the first feature film directed by Mizrahi. It was based on a short story written by Mizrahi's first wife, Rachel Fabian.

The film, an Israeli-French co-production, was nominated for the Golden Globe Award for Best Foreign Language Film and the Golden Bear Award in 1970. It also entered into the 20th Berlin International Film Festival.

== Plot ==
The film follows a German officer (Hans Christian Blech) who was a concentration camp commander near the city of Lyon. After the war, he posed as a Jewish refugee and immigrated to Israel to avoid being tried for his crimes. In Israel, he falls in love with an Israeli woman of Yemeni-Jewish descent, and they run a small hotel in Eilat together. However, the shadow of his past follows him there, and after 20 years, when a French guest (Claude Rich) arrives at the hotel, the officer fears that this Frenchman is a prisoner in his camp and might recognize and expose him. Out of fear, he murders the stranger.

== Cast ==
- Claude Rich as Customer
- Henya Sucar-Ziv as Wife
- Hans Christian Blech as Hotel Manager
- Amos Kenan
- Uzi Weinberg

== Themes ==
According to research in The Customer of the Off-Season (1970), Mizrahi ventures into uncharted territory, addressing themes seemingly beyond his historical purview as a Mizrahi filmmaker, as he seeks to present the Holocaust from a fresh perspective, focusing on an ex-Gestapo official who has been hiding in Eilat for two decades. This narrative was groundbreaking for its time, exploring concepts largely absent from both Israeli and global cinema of the 1960s and 70s, which typically centered on postwar life and the miraculous founding of the Jewish state. No other films of the era, including Israeli ones, delved into stories of Nazis posing as Jews or former Nazis assimilating into Israeli society.

== Reception ==
The film earned Mizrahi a nomination at the 28th Golden Globes for Best Foreign-Language Foreign Film. He also earned a Golden Bear nomination at the 19th Berlin International Film Festival.
