= House of Carandini =

Family name

House of Carandini Casa Carandini
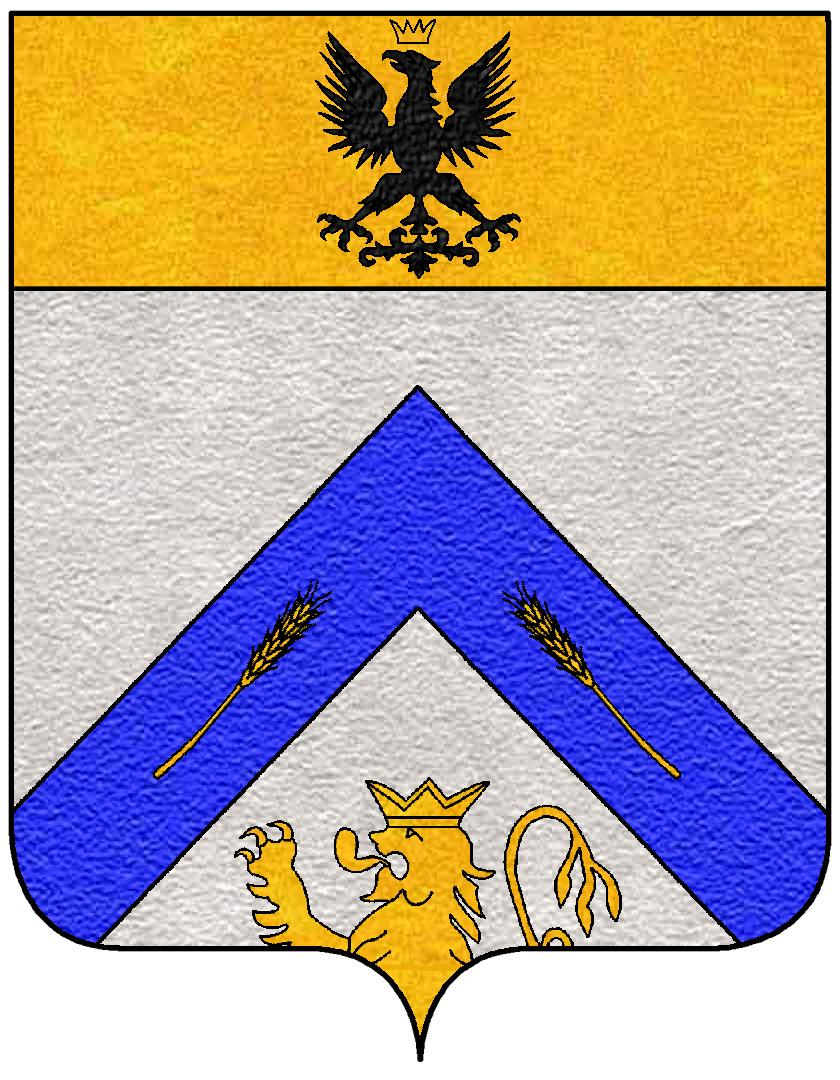
- Coat of arms of the Carandini family
- Country: Kingdom of Italy
- Founded: 12th century
- Founder: Cristoforo (Risi) Carandini
- Current head: Marquis Alberto Carandini
- Titles: Marquis of Sarzano; Count Palatine; Patrician of Modena; Noble of Bologna

The House of Carandini (originally Risi) is an ancient Italian noble family, known since the 12th century, whose members occupied many important ecclesiastical and political positions.

== History ==
Records of the Carandini family go back at least to the 12th century, when Emperor Frederick Barbarossa gave the family the right to bear the coat of arms of the Holy Roman Empire; by the 15th century, the Carandinis had risen to political prominence in Modena. The title of Conte palatino (Count palatine) was obtained by a Carandini following the Battle of Lepanto (1571). Additional titles were obtained later including that of Marchese (Marquis) of Sarzano. One or more members of the family became political fugitives in the 19th century and fled to England or Australia; some of the persons listed below are their descendants.

== Notable members of the family ==
- Filippo Carandini (1729-1810)
- Ercole Consalvi (1757-1824) (son of Claudia Carandini)
- Marie Carandini (1826-1894) (wife of Jerome Carandini, 10th Marquis of Sarzano)
- Rosina Palmer (1844-1932) (daughter of Jerome and Marie Carandini)
- Christie Palmerston (1850s-1897) (son of Jerome and Marie Carandini)
- Nicolò Carandini (1896-1972)
- Hermione Hannen (1913-1983) (granddaughter of Fanny Carandini (1849-1904), daughter of Jerome and Marie Carandini)
- Christopher Lee (1922-2015) (son of Estelle Marie Carandini (1889-1981), granddaughter of Jerome and Marie Carandini)
- Andrea Carandini (1937)
- Harriet Walter (1950) (granddaughter of Estelle Marie Carandini)
- Matteo Carandini (1967)
- Elena de Carandini Raventós, Barcelona, Spain

== Bibliography ==
- Gianna Dotti Messori, I Carandini: la storia e i documenti di una famiglia plurisecolare. No. 144. Aedes muratoriana, 1997
- Roberto Regoli, "Ercole Consalvi, le scelte per la chiesa". Editrice Pontificia Università Gregoriana, 2006
