= The Reluctant Peer =

1964 play

- Original language: English
- Written by: William Douglas Home
- Genre: Comedy
- Setting: Dower house of Lister Castle, England, present day

Premiere
- Date: 6 January 1964
- Place: Theatre Royal, Brighton

The Reluctant Peer is a 1964 comedy play by the British writer William Douglas Home. It was the latest in his series of political farces and appeared at the Duchess Theatre in London's West End where it ran between 14 January 1964 and 6 March 1965. The cast included Sybil Thorndyke, Frank Pettingell, Helen Horton, Imogen Hassall, Naunton Wayne and Viola Lyel, with Athene Seyler and Peter Graves later coming in as replacements. The plotline of an aristocrat who renounces his title imitates the real-life 1963 renunciation of his title by the author's brother Alec Douglas-Home. It includes a number of characters who had appeared in his earlier plays including The Chiltern Hundreds.

== Bibliography ==
- Brazier, Rodney. Choosing a Prime Minister: The Transfer of Power in Britain. Oxford University Press, 2020.
- Croall, Jonathon. Sybil Thorndike: A Star Of Life. Haus Publishing, 2009.
