= Athene Seyler =

English actress (1889–1990)

Athene Seyler CBE
- Seyler in 1950
- Born: 31 May 1889; London, England
- Died: 12 September 1990 (aged 101); Hammersmith, London, England
- Occupation: Actress
- Years active: 1909–68
- Spouse(s): James Bury Sterndale Bennett (m. 1914; Nicholas Hannen (m. 1960; died 1972)
- Children: 1

Athene Seyler (31 May 1889 – 12 September 1990) was an English actress.

== Early life ==
She was born in Hackney, London; her German-born grandparents moved to the United Kingdom, where her grandfather Philip Seyler was a merchant in London. Athene Seyler was educated at Coombe Hill School in Surrey, a progressive co-educational school which disliked petitionary prayer and whose advanced biology classes studied Darwin's On the Origin of Species. Seyler took part in an anti-blood sports demonstration, during which pupils captured the fox from the local hunt.

She was also active in the South Place Ethical Society during the 1920s, where her father Clarence H. Seyler took his family for many years to hear Moncure Conway lecture as an alternative to attending a religious Sunday service. Clarence ran a class for the study of Herbert Spencer, contributed to the South Place magazine on rationalist matters and wrote a treatise on birth control, which he circulated privately among his family.

== Career ==
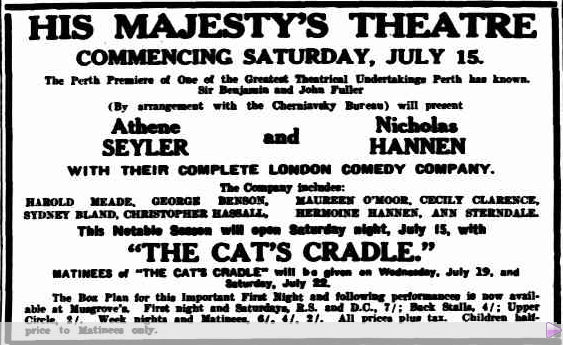
Advertisement for the Seyler Hannen Company

Seyler first appeared on the stage in 1909, and was initially known as a stage actress. She made her film debut in 1921, and subsequently became known for playing slightly dotty old ladies in many British films from the 1930s to the 1960s.

In 1933, Seyler together with Nicholas Hannen, took a company which included Hannen's daughter by his first marriage, Hermione Hannen, on a well-received tour of the Far East and Australia.

Her stage credits included Mrs Malaprop in The Rivals, Lady Bracknell in The Importance of Being Earnest and a double-act, with her good friend Dame Sybil Thorndike, as the murderous spinster sisters in Arsenic and Old Lace.

Her film and television career lasted into the 1960s, and included roles in The Citadel (1938), Night of the Demon (1957) and The Avengers (1964, 1965). She was also a regular cast member in screen adaptations of Charles Dickens' novels. Although her silent film appearance in Pickwick (1921) is missing, she played the elderly fiancée in The Pickwick Papers (1952). She was cast as a Chinese woman in Passport to China (1960).

Seyler virtually retired from acting after 1970 but continued making public appearances until well into the 1980s, and as a guest of Terry Wogan on his eponymous BBC chat show. In 1988, at the age of 99, she was the castaway on radio's Desert Island Discs. In 1990, at the age of 101, she appeared at the National Theatre, talking about her long life and career.

Athene Seyler was President of the Royal Academy of Dramatic Art (RADA) from 1950, and a member of the Theatrical Ladies' Guild. She also wrote The Craft of Comedy.

== Honours and awards ==
She was appointed a Commander of the Order of the British Empire (CBE) in 1959. In 1989 she was honoured as "Personality of the Century" by the Grand Order of Water Rats.

== Marriages and relationships ==
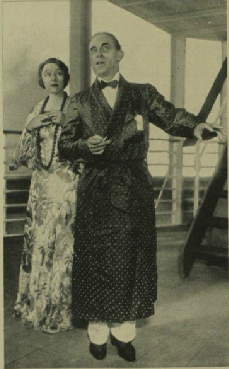
Seyler and Nicholas Hannen in Winter Sunshine, 1937

On 14 February 1914, she married James Bury Sterndale-Bennett (1889–1941), a grandson of the composer Sir William Sterndale Bennett, and they had a daughter, Jane Ann (1917–2015).

In 1922, she met and started living with fellow actor Nicholas "Beau" Hannen, son of Sir Nicholas Hannen. Hannen was married, and his wife refused a divorce. In 1928, Seyler formally changed her name to Athene Hannen, but she continued to use Seyler professionally. In 1960, she and Hannen were married after his wife died. At the age of 90, Seyler told the interviewer David McGillivray that "she hadn't been made a Dame because for most of her life she lived with a man who wasn't her husband."

== Portraits ==
The British National Portrait Gallery has numerous photos of Seyler.

The Australian National Portrait Gallery website has a portrait of Hannen and Seyler together.

== Death ==
Athene Seyler died in 1990, aged 101, and her ashes were placed in the Hannen Columbarium in St Mary's Churchyard, Wargrave.

== Selected stage performances ==
- Harvey (1949–1950) – with Sid Field, then Leslie Henson
- Watch on the Rhine
- Lady Windermere's Fan
- Mavourneen by Louis N. Parker (1915)
- The Iron Duchess by William Douglas Home (1957)
- The Reluctant Peer by William Douglas Home (1964)
- The Rivals
- Romeo and Juliet
- The Cherry Orchard
- Arsenic and Old Lace

== Filmography ==
- The Adventures of Mr. Pickwick (1921) – Rachel Wardle
- This Freedom (1923) – Miss Keggs
- The Perfect Lady (1931) – Lady Westhaven
- Tell Me Tonight (1932) – Mrs. Pategg
- Early to Bed (1933) – Frau Weiser
- Blossom Time (1934) – Archduchess Maria Victoria
- The Private Life of Don Juan (1934) – Theresa, the Innkeeper, a Middle Aged Lady of Young Sentiment
- The Rocks of Valpre (1935) – Aunt Philippa
- Royal Cavalcade (1935) – Queen Elizabeth I
- Drake of England (1935) – Queen Elizabeth
- Moscow Nights (1935) – Madame Anna Sabline
- Scrooge (1935) – Scrooge's charwoman
- It's Love Again (1936) – Mrs. Durland
- Southern Roses (1936) – Mrs. Rowland
- Irish for Luck (1936) – The Duchess
- Sensation (1936) – Madame Henry
- The Mill on the Floss (1937) – Mrs. Pullet (uncredited)
- The Lilac Domino (1937) – Madame Alary
- Non-Stop New York (1937) – Aunt Veronica
- Sailing Along (1938) – Victoria Gulliver
- Jane Steps Out (1938) – Grandma
- The Citadel (1938) – Lady Raebank
- The Ware Case (1938) – Mrs. Pinto
- The Sky's the Limit (1938) – Miss Prinney
- The Saint in London (1939) – Mrs. Buckley
- Young Man's Fancy (1939) – Milliner
- Tilly of Bloomsbury (1940) – Mrs. Banks
- The House of the Arrow (1940) – (uncredited)
- Quiet Wedding (1941) – Aunt Mary
- Dear Octopus (1943) – Aunt Belle
- The Life and Adventures of Nicholas Nickleby (1947) – Miss La Creevy
- The First Gentleman (1948) – Miss Knight
- The Queen of Spades (1949) – Princess Ivashin
- The Franchise Affair (1951) – Aunt Lin
- Young Wives' Tale (1951) – Nanny Gallop
- Secret People (1952) – Mrs. Reginald Kellick
- Treasure Hunt (1952) – Consuelo Howard
- Made in Heaven (1952) – Miss Rosabelle Honeycroft
- The Pickwick Papers (1952) – Miss Witherfield
- The Beggar's Opera (1953) – Mrs. Trapes
- The Weak and the Wicked (1954) – Millie Williams, inmate
- For Better, for Worse (1954) – Miss Mainbrace
- As Long as They're Happy (1955) – Mrs. Arbuthnot
- Yield to the Night (1956) – Miss Bligh
- Doctor at Large (1957) – Lady Hawkins
- How to Murder a Rich Uncle (1957) – Grannie
- Campbell's Kingdom (1957) – Miss Abigail
- Night of the Demon (1957) – Mrs. Karswell
- A Tale of Two Cities (1958) – Miss Emily Pross
- Happy Is the Bride (1958) – Aunt Harriet
- The Inn of the Sixth Happiness (1958) – Jeannie Lawson
- Make Mine Mink (1960) – Dame Beatrice Appleby DBE
- A French Mistress (1960) – Beatrice Peake
- Visa to Canton (1961) – Mao Tai Tai
- Francis of Assisi (1961) – Aunt Buona
- The Devil Never Sleeps (1962) – Sister Agness
- Two and Two Make Six (1962) – Aunt Phoebe Tonks
- I Thank a Fool (1962) – Aunt Heather
- The Girl on the Boat (1962) – Mrs. Adelaide Hignett
- Nurse on Wheels (1963) – Miss Farthingale

== Selected television and radio performances ==
- The Avengers episode entitled "Maneater of Surrey Green" ITV Production 1965
- The Iron Duchess by William Douglas-Home, BBC radio, broadcast 1966
- The Reluctant Peer by William Douglas-Home, BBC radio, broadcast 1967

== Publications ==
- with Stephen Haggard The Craft of Comedy (1944), reprinted by Routledge, 2012

== See also ==
- List of centenarians (actors, filmmakers and entertainers)
