= Hannen Columbarium =

Mausoleum in Berkshire, England

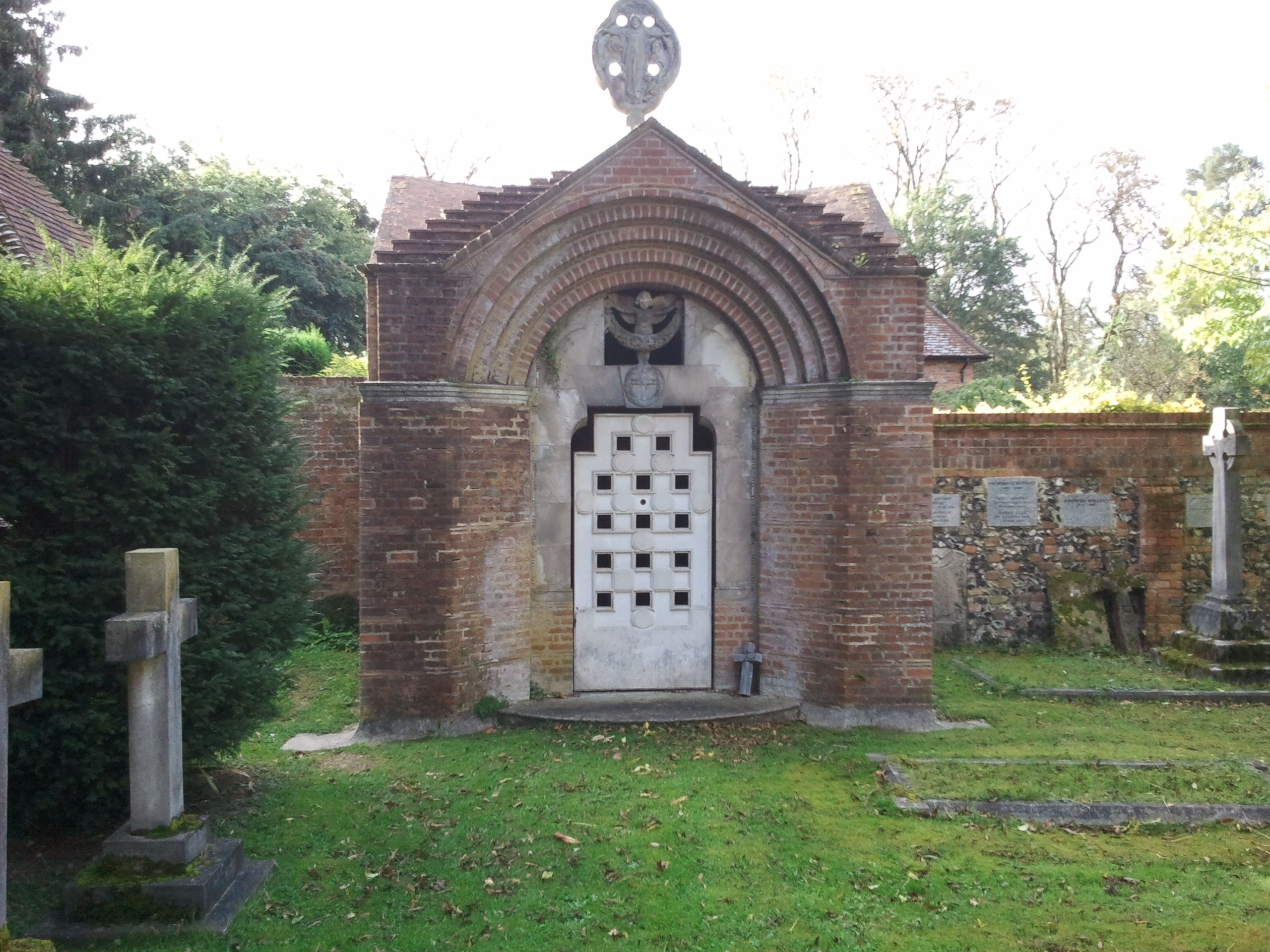
- The Hannen Columbarium in Wargrave

- Location within Berkshire

General information
- Location: Wargrave, Berkshire, England
- Coordinates: 51.49948°N 0.87339°W
- Year built: 1906–07

Design and construction
- Architect: Edwin Lutyens

Listed Building – Grade II*
- Official name: Mausoleum, 22 metres south west of Church of St Mary
- Designated: 23 December 1983
- Reference no.: 1155027

The Hannen Columbarium is a columbarium mausoleum – a resting place for the cremated remains of the deceased – built for the Hannen family of Wargrave, Berkshire, England and designed by Edwin Lutyens.

== Columbarium ==
Lutyens became acquainted with the Hannen family in about 1897 and from 1902 to 1905 employed Nicholas Hannen as an architectural trainee.

The Hannen Columbarium was built in 1906–07 to house the ashes of Nicholas's father, Sir Nicholas Hannen, a barrister, diplomat and judge who died in Shanghai in 1900.

Lutyens was commissioned in 1905, and produced a columbarium design combining Byzantine Revival with Arts and Crafts and with classical architectural lines, in the form of a 12-foot (3.7 m) square building of red-brick, red-tile, glass-tile and stonework, sited in the south-east of the graveyard of St Mary's Church, Wargrave. Within – in Lutyens's words – is "a circular cella within four piers, which carry intersecting arches forming pendentives and completed by a saucer dome." The cella is decorated with text from Luke, chapter 20, verse 38: 'He Is Not The God Of The Dead But Of The Living For All Live Unto Him'.

The Columbarium is a Grade II* listed building. It was restored in 1985, but concerns exist as to its condition. It forms Lutyens's earliest mausoleum design, and (with Heathcote in Ilkley), is recognised as an embodiment of the point at which he fully incorporated classical architecture in his designs.

== Interments ==
The following individuals are interred in the Columbarium:

- Sir Nicholas John Hannen (1842–1900)
- Lady Hannen (the former Miss Jessie Woodhouse)
- Nicholas "Beau" Hannen (Sir Nicholas' son) (1881–1972)
- Athene Seyler, Beau Hannen's wife (1889–1990)

== See also ==
- Grade II* listed buildings in Berkshire
- Wargrave War Memorial, also designed by Lutyens
