= Okhta Center =

Construction project in Russia

Okhta Center or phonetically Oḱhta-Tseńtr (Russian: О́хта-це́нтр), known before March 2007 as Gazprom City (Russian: Газпро́м-си́ти), was a construction project of a business centre in Saint Petersburg, Russia. It was supposed to include the first supertall skyscraper in the city. The 403 meters high main tower of Okhta Centre is set to be the tallest building in Europe amongst live building proposals. This project, remained unrealised, was supposed to house headquarters of the Gazprom energy company, along with museums, library, sports and leisure facilities, and a concert hall. It was to be built in the mouth of the river Okhta, on the right bank of the river Neva. Its 403-meter high tower was conceived not only as a dominant, but also as a new symbol of Saint Petersburg. It was to be completed by 2016. However, the project met fierce opposition from citizens, civil groups, and international organizations. When the project ideas were introduced to international jury, three out of four architects walked off the jury in protest, the competition was also boycotted by the Russian Union of Architects. It was eventually relocated to the new site Lakhta in Saint Petersburg in December 2010.

The core design team of the Okhta Centre includes Chief Design Architect Charles Phu, Russian architect Philipp Nikandrov, Roger Whiteman and Tony Kettle. In 2008, Arabtec, the construction company involved in construction of the world’s tallest building in Dubai, has won a contract to build this 60 billion-ruble ($2.56 billion) complex.

Gazprom's CEO Alexei Miller claimed that he is "positive that St. Petersburg’s citizens will be proud of these new architectural masterpieces." However, the Director of the Hermitage Museum, Mikhail Piotrovsky, has spoken out against the plan. Russia's culture ministry has also been reported to object to the tower's plan.

As the historical centre of Saint Petersburg is a World Heritage Site in 1991; in December 2006 UNESCO World Heritage centre Director Francesco Bandarin reminded Russia about its obligations to preserve it and expressed concern over the project. In 2007, the World Monuments Fund placed the historic skyline of St. Petersburg on its 2008 Watch List of 100 Most Endangered Sites due to the potential construction of the building, and in 2009 reported that the tower "would damage the image of Russia."

In 2010 it was reported by Russian and UK press that the project's designer Charles Phu said at a public debate in London that the architect has been getting regular memoranda from Russian Prime Minister Vladimir Putin, encouraging them to go ahead with the project of Okhta Centre and promising support from the government. This was proved to be untrue according to Putin, Phu himself and the debate participants. This controversial report, followed by heated public discussions, has resulted in certain impact on the politics in Russia.

Lakhta Centre, developed on a site farther from Saint Petersburg's historic center, is based on the Okhta Center plans including its main tower, but on an even larger scale.

== Project design ==
Gazprom City project was first introduced in November 2006. Russian Academy of Arts hosted an exhibit of the six competitive designs.

=== Projects designed by ===
- Rem Koolhaas (office of Metropolitan Architecture, US)
- Daniel Libeskind (US)
- Jean Nouvel (France)
- Massimiliano Fuksas (Italy)
- Herzog & de Meuron Architekten (Switzerland)
- RMJM London Limited (UK)

=== Jury ===
Representatives from Gazprom

- Alexey Miller (CEO of Gazprom)
- Alexander Ryazanov (President of Gazprom Neft)
- Valery Golubev (Deputy CEO of Gazprom)

Representatives from the Saint Petersburg administration

- Valentina Matviyenko (Governor of Saint Petersburg)
- Aleksandr Vakhmistrov (Deputy Governor of Saint Petersburg)
- Aleksandr Viktorov (Chairman of the Committee of City Planning and Architecture)
- Vera Dementieva (Chairwoman of the Committee of Government Control and Protection of Historical and Cultural Landmarks)

Architects

- Kisho Kurokawa (walked off the jury)
- Norman Foster (walked off the jury)
- Rafael Viñoly (walked off the jury)
- Peter Shveger

All the presented projects conceptualized the building as a new architectural dominant with proposed height ranging from 300 to 400 meters. Three out of four architects walked off the jury. Kurokawa stated that the height of construction in Saint Petersburg is "the most sensitive issue to keeping the existing cultural value of the old city centre". The competition was also boycotted by the Russian Union of Architects.

=== Winning design ===
British architecture company RMJM London Limited won the competition. The decision was announced on December 1, 2006. In addition to the opinion of the jury, Gazprom invited the public to cast their votes on the company's web-site (it was closed after the project was renamed Okhta Center) and through the ballots distributed at the exhibit. Notably, the ballots did not provide a "none of the above" option, which automatically made all those who had cast their votes into supporters of the construction. Newsportal Vedomosti organized their own survey, asking whether respondents considered it an option to construct a 300-meter skyscraper on the site of the Nyenschantz fortress. Out of 735 respondents only 68 replied affirmatively.

The proposed twisting tower is inspired by a Swedish fortress named Landskrona, occupied the site in the early 14th century, and another fortress Nyenschantz on the site until the 18th century in the form of a five-sided star to maximise views for defensive purposes. The inspiration for the design also comes from energy in water, with the building form deriving its shape from the changing nature of water and ever changing light. It gives a new interpretation to the historical fortresses with modern aesthetics and technology - transparency and democracy, internal and external interactions. It also features a unique environmental strategy, which acts as a low energy double-layered skin of the tower allowing maximum daylight and minimum heat loss in the extreme climate of the city.

=== Project description ===
The area of the complex was to be divided according to the following ratio: 35% - public use, 49% - business offices, 16% - offices of Gazprom and its subsidiaries.

The complex was to consist of three main zones:

Zone 1: Multifunctional high-rise complex. 396 meters high, 67 floors. The complex would have contained office spaces and parking, 67th floor would have been turned into an observation deck. Sport complex and conference hall were to be constructed next to it.

Zone 2: Multifunctional cultural center. Museum of modern art, Museum of architecture, and a theater building were to be constructed in this area.

Zone 3: Zone for prospective development, most likely to include sports and recreations center containing a swimming pool, skate ring, and fitness and spa centers, apartment hotel, and parking.

Architects planned to create green zones and linear parks along the embankment of the river Neva.

The 396 meter high-rise was to be pentagon-shaped in its base - a reference to the Landskrona fortification and Nyenschantz fortresses that were located at the same site in the 14th and 17th centuries respectively. Remnants of the fortresses were uncovered during archaeological excavations that begun as a result of the contention around the project

== Financial scheme ==
- 2006 scheme

Originally, the 60 billion rubles construction was supposed to be 100% funded from the city budget. The city was supposed to disburse annual payments of 6 billion rubles starting in 2006 through 2016. In return, Gazprom was to pay 7 billions in taxes annually. The building was supposed to become the property of Gazprom Neft. The city was also supposed to fund construction of housing for Gazprom executives. This scheme, in which city was supposed to return a ten-year worth of taxes to a commercial company, provoked a public outcry from a number of civil groups and the Democratic party Yabloko. The latter demanded a citywide referendum to uphold the height regulation of 48-meters.

- 2007 scheme

In March 2007 Gazprom City was renamed Okhta Center. Simultaneously, as a result of the pressure from opposition groups, financial scheme was changed: now Gazprom was supposed to provide 51% of the cost of the construction, city would have covered the remaining 49% and received capital stocks in exchange. However, according to the federal law about joint stock companies, shareholders do not become owners of the property. Thus, Gazprom would have still been a full owner of the Okhta Center real estate. As a result of contention around the construction, it became apparent that Valentina Matviyenko, the governor of Saint Petersburg, included funding of the construction in the city budget in the absence of feasibility studies and land agreement. Yabloko initiated a court case questioning the legality of the financing scheme. Saint Petersburg City Court denied the case

- 2008 scheme

December 28, 2008 Alexey Miller announced that Gazprom will cover the full cost of the construction. However, even though officially the city did not fund the construction, it established a tax break for Gazprom, that over ten years would have come up to the cost of the construction. Thus, even in the third version of the financial scheme, construction of Okhta Center would have been paid for by the taxpayers.
