= War and Love (1985 film) =

- Theatrical release poster
- Directed by: Moshé Mizrahi
- Screenplay by: Abby Mann
- Based on: The Survivor by Jack Eisner
- Produced by: Jack Eisner
- Starring: Sebastian Keneas; Kyra Sedgwick; David Spielberg; Cheryl Gianini; Eda Reiss Merin; Brita Youngblood
- Cinematography: Adam Greenberg
- Edited by: Peter Zinner
- Production company: Stafford Productions
- Distributed by: The Cannon Group, Inc.
- Release date: September 13, 1985
- Running time: 108 minutes
- Countries: United States; Israel
- Language: English

War and Love is a 1985 American drama film directed by Moshé Mizrahi, written by Abby Mann, and starring Sebastian Keneas, Kyra Sedgwick, David Spielberg, Cheryl Gianini, Eda Reiss Merin and Brita Youngblood. It was released on September 13, 1985, by The Cannon Group, Inc.

== Plot ==
Jacek, who is Jewish, miraculously manages to survive World War II in Nazi-occupied Poland. As a subplot to Jacek's story, which also involves a love affair with Haling (Kyra Sedgwick) and German soldiers' repeated attempts to kill him, is a tale of how young kids in the Warsaw ghetto devise their own method of fighting oppression.

== Cast ==
- Sebastian Keneas as Jacek
- Kyra Sedgwick as Halina
- David Spielberg as Aron
- Cheryl Gianini as Zlatka
- Eda Reiss Merin as Masha
- Brita Youngblood as Hela
- Reuel Schiller as Lutek
- Eric Faber as Yankele
- Stephen Mailer as Sevek
- Matthew Bonfiglio as Rudy
- Liliana Komorowska as Esther
- Dennis Boutsikaris as Marek
- Shmuel Wolf as Warszawski
- Lee Wallace as Oskar Kohn
- Alan Feinstein as Franek
- Gerald Hiken as Reb Shulem
- Paul Zim as Cantor
- Larry Atlas as Sarge
- Evan Handler as Elie
- Leopold Kozlowski as Band Leader
- Gołda Tencer as Singer / Mother
