= Thérèse Radic =

Australian playwright and musicologist (born 1935)

- Born: Maureen Therese O'Halloran; 1935 (age 90–91); Footscray, Victoria, Australia
- Occupations: Musicologist, playwright

Academic background
- Education: University of Melbourne
- Thesis: Some historical aspects of musical associations in Melbourne, 1888–1915 (1978)

Academic work
- Institutions: University of Melbourne

Thérèse Radic (born 1935) is an Australian musicologist and playwright.

== Early life and education ==
Maureen Therese O'Halloran was born in Footscray, Victoria in 1935 and grew up in Melbourne. She graduated from the University of Melbourne with a Bachelor of Music in 1959. She later completed a Master of Music (1969) and PhD (1978) at the same university.

== Career ==
Radic's first play, Some of My Best Friends Are Women was co-written with her husband, Leonard Radic. It was first performed by the Melbourne Theatre Company in 1983. When A Treasury of Favourite Australian Songs was published in the same year, reviewer Harry Black praised it for range of the bush songs included and for Radic's meticulous research into the origins of each song.

Radic is the author of a biography of the violinist and conductor Bernard Heinze, which was published by Macmillan in 1986. Canberra Times critic W. L. Hoffmann considered it a "fascinating" but "somewhat one-sided" portrayal. Reviewing Melba – The Voice of Australia in the same article, Hoffmann described it as a "highly readable account of her life and successes, excellently documented, and with a number of fine illustrations".

In 1994 Radic chaired "The Composing Women's Festival", a five-day event celebrating the musical contribution of Australian women composers. Several works were commissioned. In his preview, music critic Mike Daly reported that "16 concerts and recitals included classical, jazz, pop, electronic and experimental music, plus multi-media installations, demonstrations and conferences."

Radic has contributed 18 biographies to the Australian Dictionary of Biography.

== Selected works ==
=== Books ===
- G.W.L. Marshall-Hall: Portrait Of A Lost Crusader (1982)
- Melba: The Voice of Australia (1986)
- Bernard Heinze (1986)
- A Treasury of Favourite Australian Songs (1983; 2nd ed. 1988)
- Songs of Australian Working Life (1989)
- G.W.L. Marshall Hall: A Biography and Catalogue (2002)
- Marshall-Hall’s Melbourne: Music, Art and Controversy 1891–1915, co-authored with Suzanne Robinson (2012)

As editor:

- Repercussions (1995)
- The Playwrights' Handbook (1994; 2nd ed. 1997)
- Race Against Time: The diaries of F.S.Kelly (2004)

=== Plays ===
- Some of My Best Friends Are Women, co-authored with Leonard Radic (1983)
- A Whip Round for Percy Grainger (1984)
- Cinders (1985)
- Madame Mao (1986)
- Peach Melba (1990)
- The Emperor Regrets (1992)
- A Committed Adultery (1992)
- Shanghai Sisters (2000)
- George and the Dragon (2004)
- Cafe Scheherazade (2011)

== Personal ==
Radic was married to Leonard Radic (1935–9 January 2018). Their son, Steve, is an artist.
