= Christie Palmerston =

Australian explorer and prospector

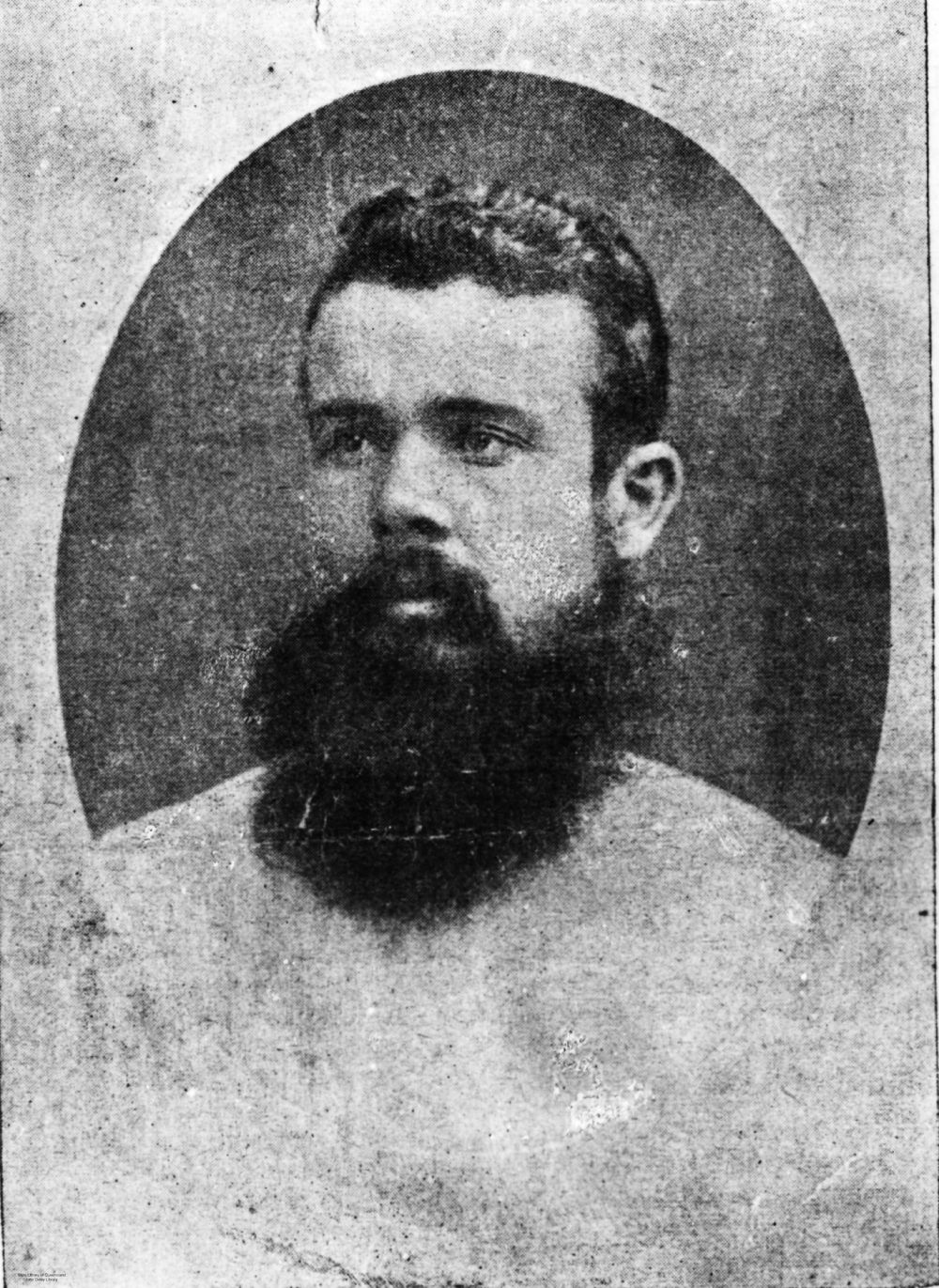
- Born: Cristofero Palmerston Carandini c. 1850; Colony of New South Wales
- Died: 15 January 1897 (aged 46–47); Kuala Pilah, Malaysia
- Occupations: Prospector and explorer of North Queensland
- Spouse: Teresa Rooney
- Children: 1 daughter

Cristofero Palmerston Carandini or Christopher "Christie" Palmerston (c. 1850 – 15 January 1897) was an Australian explorer and prospector in North Queensland. He led several expeditions during the last quarter of the 19th century including the discovery of a route along the Mowbray River, which eventually led to the founding of Port Douglas.

== Early life ==
It has been claimed that Palmerston was the natural son of Lord Palmerston. However, Palmerston was born in Melbourne, at the time in the Colony of New South Wales, unless he was younger than normally thought, to Casino Jerome Carandini, the 10th Marquis of Sarzano and Marie Burgess, an English-born opera singer. Palmerston was baptised Cristofero Palmerston Carandini. This is the name he gives on his marriage registration in 1886, when he listed his father as Casino Carandini. His elder brother Frank succeeded to the marquessate upon their father's death in 1870, and his sister Isabella Sara married in 1886, Sir Norman Montgomery Abercrombie Campbell, 10th Baronet.

== Employment and conviction in central Queensland ==
In 1868 Christopher Palmerston, in a departure from the theatrical heritage of his family, was employed as a stockman on the Willangi cattle station near St Lawrence in the Broadsound area of central coastal Queensland. The station was run by brothers William and Mark Christian who were powerful squatters in the region. While droving cattle to Rockhampton in early 1869, Palmerston rode off on one of his employer's horses and sold the saddle to a stable owner. He was arrested for horse stealing and later convicted. Palmerston appealed the decision but it was dismissed and he was sentenced to two years in a Brisbane prison.

== Prospecting and early expeditions ==
Palmerston then worked in the Palmer River Gold Rush of 1872–1874. Old timers on the field noted that while Palmerston never seemed to do any mining he was always flush with gold and rumours abounded that Palmerston, with his Aboriginal men, were murdering miners for their gold. However, it was not until around 1876 during the Hodgkinson River Gold Rush that Palmerston began to be known as a pathfinder.

As trade increased from Hodgkinson, Cooktown merchants began to worry that a new port at Cairns would take over the majority of the trade. As a result, in 1877 the merchants backed Palmerston to cut a track from the goldfields to a new port at Island Point. As Palmerston became more well known as a path cutter, he embarked on more explorations, including his notable discovery of a route along the Mowbray River, which contributed to the founding of Port Douglas.

In 1878 a warrant for his arrest was issued on a felony charge.

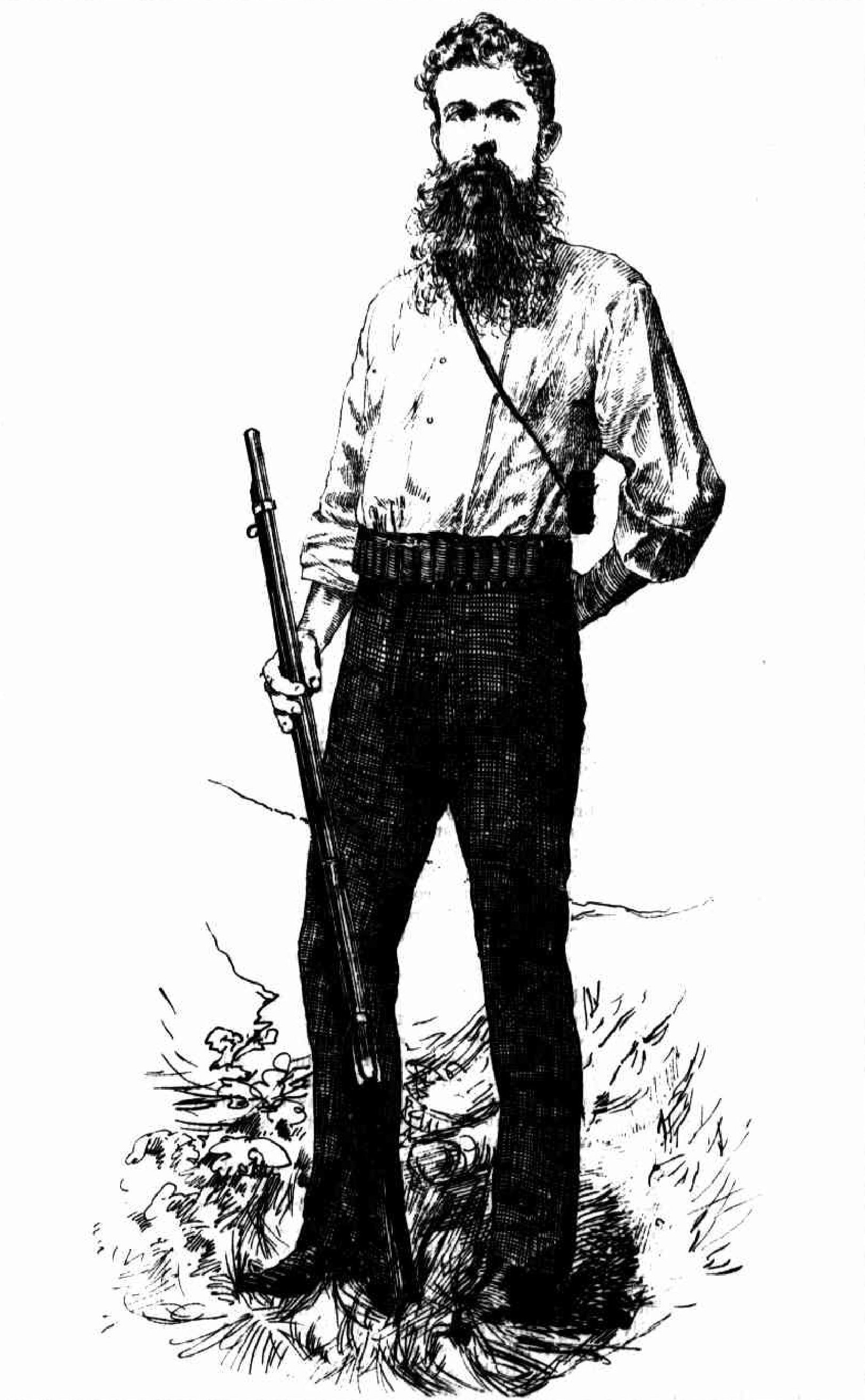
Christie Palmerston in 1887

Towards the end of the 1880s on the Russell River field, as the field played out and was abandoned by European miners, Palmerston induced Chinese miners to come to the diggings by promising them certified amounts of gold per day and guaranteeing protection from Aboriginal attack. He charged them £1 per head and the offer was taken up by 30 miners with a further 200 following soon after. The promises were hollow but then, as a standover man, with the backing of armed Aboriginal gang, he extorted money from the Chinese, prevented supplies from reaching the diggings so that he could charge exorbitant prices for meat and effectively imprisoned the Chinese diggers by beating up any miner who attempted to leave the field. A Police Magistrate in Innisfail later found against a Chinese businessman in a civil suit brought against Palmerston, but a Senior Magistrate, W S Walsh, in a report to the Colonial Secretary found the evidence more than sufficient for a conviction.

During the 1880s, large parts of coastal far North Queensland were still covered in dense rainforest. Palmerston boasted of shooting a large number of Aboriginals in Mamu territory. According to his diary of the Russell River expedition, in the early hours of the morning of 8 September 1886, Palmerston and his Aboriginal bearers from the neighbouring tribe tracked a group of Aboriginal people to a cockatoo bora ground on the western bank of the upper Mulgrave River. They observed as Aboriginal men performed what appeared to be an increase ceremony.

Palmerston described it thus: "It was a borah ground, large and original, situated on the left bank of the Mulgrave. In the centre of the ground were dug two long parallel rows of oval-shaped holes, filled with crouching figures, that portion just below the armpits and upwards being the only exposed parts. Quivering tufts of white and yellow cockatoo feathers decorated their nodding heads; bunches of larger white fluttering feathers were fixed along their arms and hands, which they worked in wing-wave fashion; the face and other parts of the body were formed in stripes of fine white down. Amid these were two tall poles, up which many more niggers were perched and befeathered in a similar style. Their legs and arms were akimbo, and their nodding heads accompanied a bantering vein of cockatoo screeches, which ended occasionally with roars of mirth." Then he shot them.

Just after dawn Palmerston and his men opened fire from three sides, the river being on the fourth side. Palmerston wrote that afterwards he reduced "heaps of war implements to ashes" and took two young boys as captives. The boys escaped during the night, "shackles and all". In that same year,1886, possibly around the 22nd of July, Palmerston is recorded to have raped and murdered an Aboriginal woman, on the South Johnstone River.

In 1880, Palmerston was part of a private expedition led by James Venture Mulligan to search for gold at the heads of the King and Lukin rivers in northern Queensland. On the King River, Mulligan wrote about how Palmerston shot two Aboriginal men and returned to camp with a stolen "little blackboy". At night, they handcuffed the child to Pompey, Palmerston's other "boy", to prevent him from escaping. The expedition failed to find any significant signs of gold deposits.

== Later life and death ==
Palmerston settled down in Townsville and married Teresa Rooney at St Joseph's Church on 6 December 1886; they had one daughter. Palmerston moved to Borneo and then Malaya where he contracted fever in the jungle and died at Kuala Pilah on 15 January 1897.

His life was the subject of a 1957 radio feature on the Australian Broadcasting Commission, The Legend of Christie Palmerston.
