= Moshé Mizrahi =

Israeli film director (1931–2018)

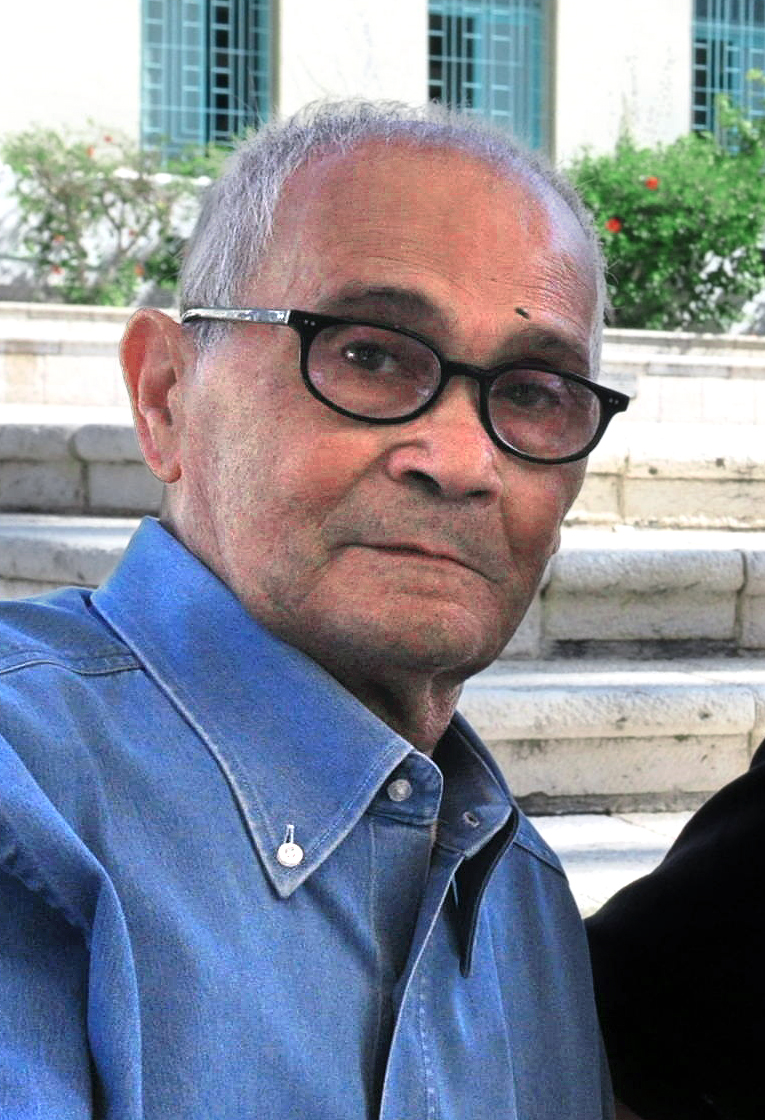
- Born: 5 September 1931; Alexandria, Egypt
- Died: 3 August 2018 (aged 86); Tel Aviv, Israel
- Occupation: Film director
- Years active: 1969–2016

Moshé Mizrahi (Hebrew: משה מזרחי; 5 September 1931 – 3 August 2018) was an Israeli film director. His accolades include an Academy Award, an Ophir Award and two awards from the Berlin International Film Festival, as well. He also received two further Academy Award nominations, a Golden Globe nomination and two nominations from the Cannes Film Festival.

He made his feature film directorial debut with The Customer of the Off Season (1970). He followed up with I Love You Rosa (1972) and The House on Chelouche Street (1973), with both films receiving nominations for the Academy Award for Best Foreign Language Film. He later won the Academy Award for Best Foreign Language Film for Madame Rosa (1977), based on the novel, The Life Before Us by Romain Gary.

He later directed the American films, War and Love (1985), a Holocaust film, followed by the Jerusalem-set Every Time We Say Goodbye (1986), with Tom Hanks. His final film was A Weekend in the Galilee (2007).

In 2001, he was awarded a Lifetime Achievement Ophir Award.

== Early life ==
He was born in Alexandria in Egypt to parents Haim Victor and Dora (Behar) Mizrahi. His father died of an abscess when Moshe was 9 years-old and his mother then supported four children by doing housework for other families. The family migrated to Mandatory Palestine in 1946, and two years later his 9-year-old brother, Shabtay, was killed in an Egyptian bombing raid. Due to a shortage of undertakers amid high casualties, he and his uncle had to dig a brave for his younger brother. He then settled on a Kibbutz, where he embraced Communism.

In 1950, he relocated to Paris by applying for a position with the Jewish Agency and where he studied cinema

Upon his return to Israel, he found work as newspaper report and also penned Hebrew film subtitles.

== Career ==
Mizrahi returned to Paris in 1958, where he worked in television and was hired at Telfrance, becoming a production manager and then producer.

He made his feature film directorial debut in 1970, with The Customer of the Off Season. The film earned Mizrahi a nomination at the 28th Golden Globes for Best Foreign-Language Foreign Film. He also earned a Golden Bear nomination at the 19th Berlin International Film Festival.

In 1971, he directed Les Stances à Sophie, his first French film and adapted from Christiane Rochefort's novel of the same name. The film follows a young, modern and opinionated woman married to a bourgeois man who attempts to her to accept his patriarchal stance.

In 1972, he released I Love You Rosa, drawing of the experiences of his maternal great-grandmother for the late 19th century-set story, which follows a young widow, obliged to marry her younger brother-in-law. The film earned Mizrahi a nomination for the Academy Award for Best Foreign Language Film.

He earned a second nomination for the Academy Award for Best Foreign Language Film] for The House on Chelouche Street (1973). He then won the award for Madame Rosa (1977) The film, starring Simone Signoret, was about a former prostitute in Paris who survived Auschwitz.

In September 1994, he was honored by the Haifa Film Festival for his lifetime contribution to Israeli cinema.

Since the 1990s, he was long-term adjunct professor of cinema at Tel Aviv University.

== Personal life ==
He was previously married to Rachel Fabian, with the couple later divorcing.

In 1980 he married Michal Bat-Adam, and actress, screenwriter and director, who had appeared in five of his films.

He later led a film-making workshop in Tel Aviv University's film school.

=== Death ===
He died of pneumonia on 3 August 2018, at the age of 86.

He was survived by his wife and two children, a son, Daniel, and a daughter, Orit.

== Filmography ==
Year	Title	Notes
1970	The Customer of the Off Season	
1971	Les Stances à Sophie	Also known as Sophie's Ways
1972	I Love You Rosa	Hebrew title: Ani Ohev Otach Rosa
1973	Daughters, Daughters	
1973	The House on Chelouche Street	
1975	Rachel's Man	
1977	Madame Rosa	Original title: La Vie devant soi
1979	Une jeunesse	Based on the novel by Patrick Modiano
1980	Chère inconnue	Also known as I Sent a Letter to My Love
1985	War and Love	
1986	Every Time We Say Goodbye	
1988	Mangeclous	
1996	Women	
2007	A Weekend in the Galilee	
