= Hermione Hannen =

British actress (1913–1983)

- Born: 26 January 1913; London, England
- Died: 1 October 1983 (aged 70); Shrewsbury, Shropshire, England
- Education: Royal Academy of Dramatic Art
- Occupation: Actress
- Years active: 1932–1950s
- Spouses: Anthony Quayle (m. 1935; div. 1941) Clifford Evans (m. 1943)
- Father: Nicholas "Beau" Hannen
- Relatives: Nicholas John Hannen (grandfather); Athene Seyler (step-mother); Ariane Mnouchkine (niece)

Hermione Hannen (26 January 1913 – 1 October 1983) was an English theatre and film actress. She was born in London, the daughter of Nicholas "Beau" Hannen, who was also an actor on the stage and in film.

== Biography ==
Hermione Hannen was born on 26 January 1913, London.

Hannen's grandfather was Sir Nicholas John Hannen, who served as Chief Justice of the British Supreme Court for China and Japan and also as British Consul-General in Shanghai. Sir Nicholas died in office and marines from HMS Hermione served as an honour guard and pallbearers at his funeral. On her mother's side she was the grand-daughter of Sir Henry Morland, a British administrator in the Bombay Presidency of India. Through his marriage to Fanny Ellen Hannah Louisa Carandini, she was the great-grand-daughter of the opera singer, Marie Carandini. Marie was married to the Italian nobleman, Jerome Carandini, the Marquis of Sarzano, and thus Hannen was also a distant cousin of the actor Christopher Lee.

== Career ==
Hannen trained at the Royal Academy of Dramatic Art. Her début as an actress was in Cairo in 1932 during her father's tour of the Far East and Australia. In the 1930s, she acted in numerous plays performed at the Old Vic in London, including The Voysey Inheritance, The Rivals, Man and Superman and Hamlet. She also played Ophelia in Hamlet at the Westminster Theatre in 1937 and in Silent Night at St James's.

She also performed in five films from 1935 to 1946.

During World War II, from 1940 to 1945, she was a BBC announcer, and from 1954, she broadcast regularly in plays.

Hannen also published the book The Whole Wide World Apart in 1956.

== Marriages ==
Hannen was married twice. Her first husband was the English actor Anthony Quayle (1913–1989) and her second husband was the Welsh actor Clifford Evans (1912–1985), who survived her.

== Death ==
Hannen died in Shrewsbury on 1 October 1983, aged 70.
