= Filippo Carandini =

Italian Roman Catholic cardinal

Filippo Carandini (6 September 1729 - 28 August 1810) was an Italian Roman Catholic cardinal.

== Biography ==
He was born in Pesaro to the aristocratic Carandini family. He was elevated to Cardinal in January 1787. He participated in the Papal Conclave of 1799-1800, held in Venice.

In 1790, he accused prince Sigismondo Chigi della Rovere of trying to poison him in retribution for the cardinal having counseled his second wife, Donna Giovanna Medici di Ottaiano, to abandon her new husband. For this, Chigi employed two men (Sebastiani and Bandini) to poison the cardinal; the plot was uncovered, and Chigi lived in exile in Padua till 1793. Carandini was a close friend of Pompeo Batoni.

== Bibliography ==
- Bressan, Dino, and Ronald T. Ridley. The Prince as Poisoner: The Trial of Sigismondo Chigi, Rome 1790. Studi e Testi, 494. Città del Vaticano: Biblioteca Apostolica Vaticana, 2015.
