= Francesco Carandini =

Italian poet and historian (1858–1946)

Francesco Carandini (13 November 1858 – 23 October 1946) was an Italian poet and historian.

== Biography ==
He was born in Colleretto Parella, in the house of Giacosa, by the Marquis Federico and Elisa Realis, sister Paola, mother of Joseph and Piero Giacosa. He graduated in law at Turin in 1887 and began his career as Prefect of Perugia, he was secretary to the prefectures of Pinerolo, Turin, Parma, Crema and Biella, vice-Prefect of Rome during the 1915–1918 war, then prefect in Forlì, Verona and Udine. In May 1923 he resigned rather than serve the Fascist government and devoted himself to historical studies.

He passionately loved Parella, where in 1935 he built a villa, the "house on the hill" he had long dreamed of and desired.

== Bibliography ==
Of the seventy writings of Carandini, the most known is "Old Ivrea" which still represents a unique source of news, facts, data about the past of Ivrea.
