= Marie Carandini =

English-born Australian opera singer

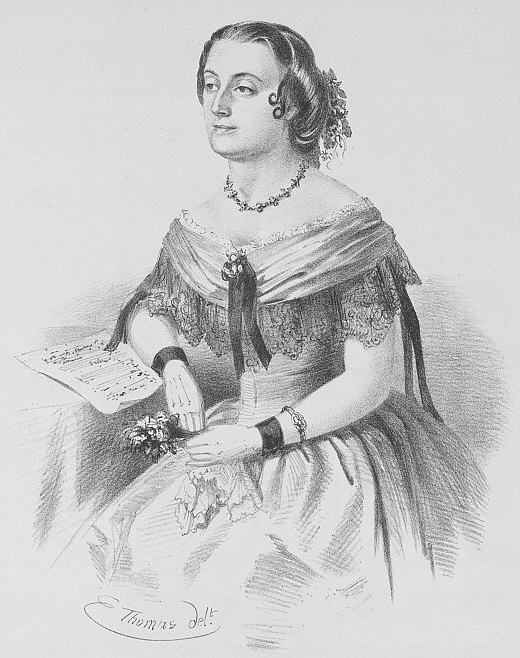
- Drawing of Marie Carandini on the cover of Lewis Henry Lavenu's I Cannot Sing Tonight
- Born: Maria Burgess; 1 February 1826; Brixton, Surrey, England
- Died: 13 April 1894 (aged 68); Richmond Hill, Somerset, England
- Occupation: Opera singer
- Years active: 1845–1894
- Spouse(s): Jerome Carandini, Marquis of Sarzano (m. 1843; died 1870)
- Children: 8, including Rosina Palmer
- Relatives: Christopher Lee (great-grandson); Harriet Walter (great-great-granddaughter)

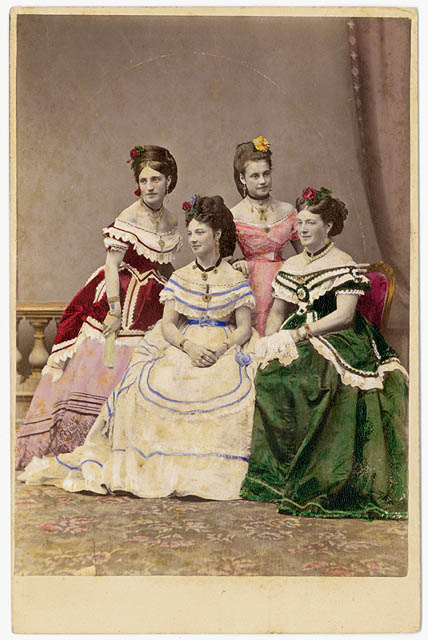
Marie and her daughters

Marie Carandini, Marchioness of Sarzano (born Maria Burgess; 1 February 1826 – 13 April 1894) was an English-Australian opera singer.

== Early life ==
Maria Burgess was born in Brixton, Surrey, in 1826. She was the daughter of coachman James Burgess (died 1835) and Martha Burgess (née Medwin). Her mother was a cousin of Thomas Medwin, Byron's companion and biographer, and her father claimed a close relationship to Shelley.

In 1843, she married Jerome Carandini, an Italian marquis. The couple had 5 daughters and 3 sons.

== Career ==
She was frequently billed as "The Australian Jenny Lind". She has the distinction of having been Australia's first Adalgisa in Bellini's opera Norma (1852, Royal Victoria Theatre, Sydney) beside the Norma of Sara Flower. In November 1858 Carandini sang Leonora in Verdi's Il trovatore in a twenty-seven performance season at the Princess Theatre, Melbourne. The Carandini troupe performed what may have been New Zealand's first full opera production when they performed Henry Bishop's Guy Mannering at Dunedin's Princess Theatre in September 1862.

Carandini's last Australian appearance was in farewell concert on 3 February 1892 at the Melbourne Town Hall; she sang "Jessie the flower of Dumblane" with a strong voice for her age. Soon afterwards she left for England.

== Personal life and death ==
Carandini lived at Richmond Hill, near Bath, with her daughter, Fanny. She died there on 13 April 1894, aged 68.

Her eldest son Frank James (1847-1920), who inherited his father’s title, had a career in the British Army, seeing action in the Second Anglo-Afghan War and retiring with the rank of Major. Another son Christie Palmerston was an explorer and prospector in northern Queensland.. Her eldest daughter Rosina Palmer was a notable Australian soprano, while daughter Fanny was also a well-known singer; she married Sir Henry Morland.

Carandini's great-grandson (by Frank's daughter and her granddaughter, Countess Estelle Marie (née Carandini di Sarzano); (1889–1981) was the actor Sir Christopher Lee. His niece and her great-great-granddaughter is Dame Harriet Walter. Another great-granddaughter is the actress Hermione Hannen, granddaughter of her daughter Fanny.

== Legacy ==
A street in the Canberra suburb of Melba is named in her honour.
