= Charles Phu =

Taiwanese architect and opera set designer

Charles Phu (Traditional Chinese: 符傳禎; Russian: Чарльз Фу), is a London-based architectural designer and opera set designer. Countries and regions in which his design works are located include Europe, Russia, USA, China, India, Taiwan, and the Middle East. Phu is the founder and design director of the London-based design practice Office for Architectural Culture. He designed the CCK Presidential Memorial Library and Museum in Taipei, and the chief architectural designer of 'Okhta Centre', now known as Lakhta Centre, in Saint Petersburg.

Charles Phu was selected one of the 18 prominent international architectural designers by European journalists in 2011.

Phu has made a number of studies on architecture and cultures including Uyghurs, Mongolians, Uzbeks along the ancient Silk Road.

== Designs ==
Phu designed a number of landmark buildings, tall buildings, cultural buildings and master plan designs. Amongst his design works are:

- CCK Chi-Hai Cultural Park - Chiang Ching-Kuo Presidential Memorial Library and Museum, Taipei, Taiwan.
- The Okhta Centre project (including the 463-meter high tower and concert hall) in St Petersburg, Russia, for which he was the Chief Architectural Designer. Its construction is expected to be completed in 2019.
- Famen Temple World Zen Meditation Park and Museums Development, Shaanxi, China
- UNESCO Heritage Site Tang Dynasty Imperial 'Daming Palace regeneration development, Xi'an, China
- International Oceanic Fishing Cultural Centre Development, Tanmen, China
- Dankuni New Township Master Plan, Kolkata, India
- China World Trade Center Tower III (330m) and Shangri-la Summit Wing Hotel in Beijing
- Beijing Financial Street, including Ritz-Carlton Hotel

== Okhta Centre ==
In 2010 it was reported by Russian and UK press that Charles Phu said at a public debate in London that the architect has been getting regular memoranda from Vladimir Putin, encouraging them to go ahead with the project of Okhta Centre and promising support from the government. This resulted in widespread press coverage and heated public discussions but was proved to be untrue according to Putin, Phu himself and the participants.

== Opera set design ==
After designing opera productions in Asia and North America, Phu made his UK debut as an opera designer with Sonya's Story, which premiered in London on 7 August 2010. The critic from The Independent described Phu's sets and lighting for the premiere production as "elegant". In 2013 Phu created the set and lighting designs for the opera 'Cosi fan tutte' in Dubrovnik, Croatia, the first opera production in Dubrovnik in 48 years.
