= Nicholas Hannen (actor) =

British actor (1881–1972)

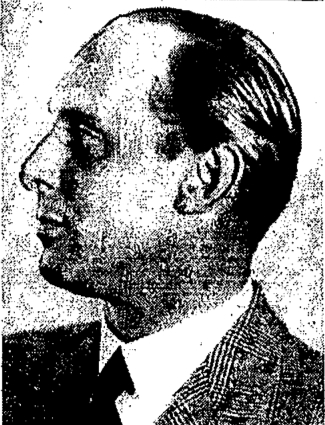
- Born: 1 May 1881; London, England
- Died: 25 June 1972 (aged 91); London, England
- Occupation: Actor
- Years active: 1910–1962
- Spouses: Muriel Morland (m. 1907; died 1960) Athene Seyler (m. 1960)
- Father: Nicholas John Hannen
- Relatives: Hermione Hannen (daughter)

Nicholas James "Beau" Hannen OBE (mil) (1 May 1881 – 25 June 1972) was a British actor of the early and mid-20th century who acted in a number of stage plays and films.

== Early life ==
Hannen was born on 1 May 1881 at No. 40 Westbourne Park Road, London, England. He was brought up in Yokohama and Shanghai where his father, Sir Nicholas John Hannen was serving, first as Judge of the British Court for Japan (1881–1891) and then Chief Justice of the British Supreme Court for China and Japan (1891–1900) as well as Consul-General in Shanghai (1891–1897). He attended Radley College from 1895 to 1900 where he was a member of the rowing eight. His uncle, James Hannen, was a noted English judge.

Sir Nicholas Hannen died, in 1900, at the young age of 58 in Shanghai just before Beau turned 19. Sir Nicholas was given a funeral with full honours including a full honour guard from the crew of HMS Hermione then in harbour in Shanghai and the pallbearers at his funeral were from the crew of the boat.

== Architecture apprenticeship ==
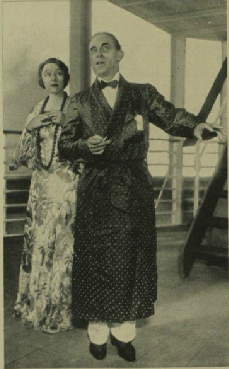
Athene Seyler and Nicholas Hannen in Winter Sunshine

From 1902 to 1905, Beau Hannen worked in the offices of the famous architect Edwin Lutyens as an apprentice. Lutyens designed a columbarium – the Hannen Columbarium – for the Hannen family that was completed in 1907. It still stands to this day in the graveyard of St Mary's Churchyard in Wargrave. In 1907, his mother, Jessie (née Woodhouse), died and her ashes as well as his father's were interred in the columbarium.

== Marriages and descendants ==
Hannen married Muriel Morland, the daughter of the late Sir Henry and Lady Morland in 1907. They had two daughters and a son. One of his daughters, Hermione Hannen, was born in 1913 and presumably named after HMS Hermione; she went on to have a successful acting career and was married twice, firstly to Anthony Quayle and later to Clifford Evans.

Another daughter, June Hannen, married the film producer Alexandre Mnouchkine; they are the parents of Ariane Mnouchkine, who had a prominent career in the French theatrical scene.

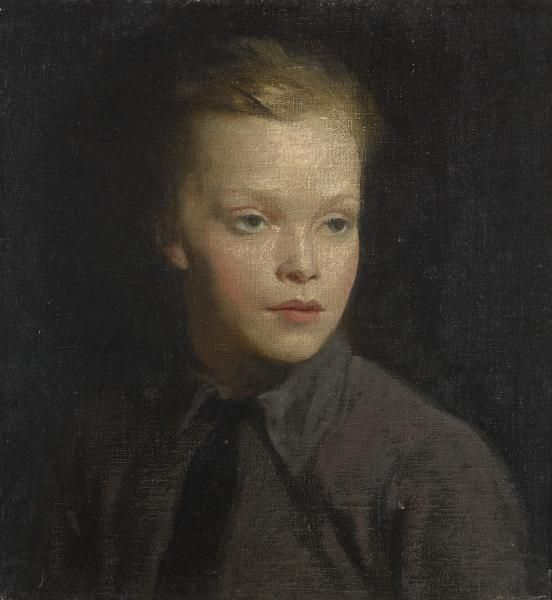
Peter Hannen, 1915–1916 by Glyn Philpot

Hannen's son, Peter (1908, London – 21 January 1932, London), became an actor too (A Honeymoon Adventure (1931) and The Water Gipsies (1932)), but died at the age of 23 in 1932.

In 1922, Hannen met the actress Athene Seyler (1889–1990) and they started living together. His first wife refused him a divorce, so they were not able to marry until 1960, after his first wife had died. Seyler, however, had changed her name by deed poll to Hannen in 1928.

== Service in the First World War ==
Hannen was commissioned into the Army Service Corps in 1915 and during his wartime service was mentioned in despatches and awarded an OBE in the 1919 Birthday Honours for valuable service rendered in connection with military operations in France.

== Acting career ==
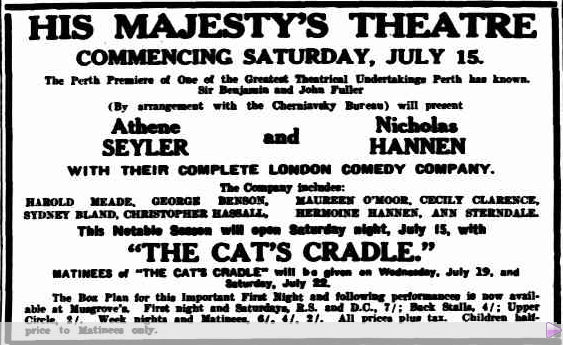
Advertisement for the Seyler Hannen Company

In 1910 Hannen became a professional actor.

He appeared in close to 50 stage plays in London, including Henry VIII and The Importance of Being Earnest as well as 'Arms and the Man, at the New Theatre in St. Martins Lane. In this production, for the Old Vic Company, he played Major Paul Petkov, in a cast which included Margaret Leighton, Sybil Thorndike, Ralph Richardson, Joyce Redman and Laurence Olivier.

Hannen performed in at least 26 films from 1931 to 1960, including Richard III as the Archbishop and Henry V as the Duke of Exeter.

In 1933, Hannen and Seyler took a company, which included Hermione Hannen, on a well-received tour of Australia.

== Death ==
Hannen died on 25 June 1972 in London.

== Partial filmography ==
- The Man They Couldn't Arrest (1931) – Lyall
- F.P.1 (1933) – Matthias Lennartz
- Murder at the Inn (1934) – Dedreet
- The Dictator (1935) – Prime Minister Guldberg of Denmark
- Hail and Farewell (1936) – Col. Harvey
- The Story of Papworth, the Village of Hope (1936) – Vicar
- Who Killed John Savage? (1937) – John Savage
- Marigold (1938) – Major Sellar
- Spy for a Day (1940) – Col. Pemberton
- The Prime Minister (1941) – Sir Robert Peel
- Henry V (1944) – Duke of Exeter
- The Winslow Boy (1948) – Col. Watherstone
- Hell Is Sold Out (1951) – François
- Quo Vadis (1951) – Seneca
- Three Steps in the Dark (1953) – Arnold Burgoyne
- The Adventures of Quentin Durward (1955) – John – Cardinal Balue
- Richard III (1955) – Archbishop
- Sea Wife (1957) – Elderly Passenger
- Prescription for Murder (1958) – Colonel
- Dunkirk (1958) – Vice Admiral Ramsay
- A Tale of Two Cities (1958) – Old Bailey Judge
- Francis of Assisi (1961) – Beggar
- Term of Trial (1962) – Magistrate
