= The Constant Nymph =

The Constant Nymph may refer to:

- The Constant Nymph (novel), a 1924 novel by Margaret Kennedy
- The Constant Nymph (1928 film), starring Ivor Novello, Mabel Poulton, and Benita Hume, co-directed by Basil Dean
- The Constant Nymph (1933 film), starring Victoria Hopper, Brian Aherne, and Leonora Corbett
- The Constant Nymph (1943 film), starring Charles Boyer, Joan Fontaine, and Alexis Smith
