= Escape Me Never (1935 film) =

- Directed by: Paul Czinner
- Screenplay by: Robert Cullen; Carl Zuckmayer or Carl Mayer
- Based on: Escape Me Never 1935 play by Margaret Kennedy; The Fool of the Family 1930 novel by Margaret Kennedy
- Produced by: Herbert Wilcox
- Starring: Elisabeth Bergner; Hugh Sinclair; Griffith Jones; Penelope Dudley-Ward
- Cinematography: Sepp Allgeier; Georges Périnal; Freddie Young
- Edited by: David Lean
- Music by: William Walton
- Production company: British & Dominions
- Distributed by: United Artists
- Release date: 1 April 1935
- Running time: 102 minutes / USA: 95 min
- Country: United Kingdom
- Language: English

Escape Me Never is a 1935 British drama film directed by Paul Czinner, produced by Herbert Wilcox, and starring Elisabeth Bergner (recreating the role of Gemma as she created it onstage in New York and London), Hugh Sinclair and Griffith Jones. The score is by William Walton with orchestration by Hyam Greenbaum. Bergner was nominated for the Oscar for Best Actress for her performance, but lost to Bette Davis. British readers of Film Weekly magazine voted the 1935 Best Performance in a British Movie to her. The film is an adaptation of the play Escape Me Never by Margaret Kennedy, which was based upon her 1930 novel The Fool of the Family. That book was a sequel to The Constant Nymph, which was also about the Sanger family of musical geniuses, but there is a disjunct among the books and the films: the Sanger brothers are never mentioned in the 1943 film version of The Constant Nymph. Another film adaptation of Escape Me Never was made in 1947 by Warner Bros.

== Plot ==
In Venice, Sir Ivor (Leon Quartermaine) and Lady McLean (Irene Vanbrugh) are entertaining a guest when a woman is discovered dressed as a schoolgirl hiding in one of their rooms – she confesses that she is not part of the school party visiting during the Wednesday open day but a poor unwed mother using the crowded school party as a means of getting a free dinner. She is asked more about her background and reluctantly relates that she is living with a composer, the son of the famous maestro Sanger. The McLean's daughter, Fenella (Penelope Dudley-Ward), is engaged to a composer, the son of the famous maestro Sanger. The McLeans jump to the obvious conclusion and, outraged, whisk Fenella off to the Italian Alps. Gemma (Elisabeth Bergner) meets Caryle Sanger (Griffith Jones) the brother of her lover, Sebastian Sanger (Hugh Sinclair), and they set off into the mountains to find work as a cabaret act. Sebastian has an idea for a ballet and when he sees Fenella searching an hotel balcony for her mother's purse, he has a coup de foudre. Sebastian helps Fenella find the purse and christеns her Prima Vera – his muse. Fenella falls in love with Sebastian . Gemma finds the two on the balcony and gleefully explains the confusion. Sebastian is cross with Gemma at first, but after Gemma leaves him he runs after her and asks her to marry him.

Gemma, Sebastian and the baby return to London, and she goes into service while Sebastian prepares his ballet for production. But even after they are married, Sebastian continues to see Fenella in secret. Gemma goes to Fenella and warns her that Sebastian cares about no one but himself and nothing but his music. Indeed, he ignores the baby's failing health, and when Gemma seeks him at the Opera House, she is forced to leave the building. When Gemma fails to appear on Opening Night, Fenella tries to persuade Sebastian to run away with her. Sebastian knows his ballet is a triumph. He does not yet know that his child is dead. When Caryle learns the whole story, he tries to kill his brother. Sebastian survives and returns to Gemma, chastened.

According to TCM.com, contemporary reviews of this film describe Gemma as an unwed mother, but bowdlerized versions of the film's copyright materials indicate that Gemma was a widow and that the baby was not Sebastian's but was born of that previous marriage. This was the approach used to satisfy the censors in the 1947 movie version, with Ida Lupino as Gemma.

== Cast ==
- Elisabeth Bergner as Gemma Jones
- Hugh Sinclair as Sebastian Sanger
- Griffith Jones as Caryle Sanger
- Penelope Dudley-Ward as Fenella McClean
- Irene Vanbrugh as Lady Helen McClean
- Leon Quartermaine as Sir Ivor McClean
- Lyn Harding as Herr Heinrich
- Rosalinde Fuller as Teremtcherva
- Victor Rietti as Shopkeeper

== Production ==
The film was shot on location in Venice and the Dolomites.

== Reception ==
It was the 19th most popular film at the British box office in 1935/36. Wilcox was surprised by its success – it outgrossed his more "commercial" films.
