= Escape Me Never =

Escape Me Never may refer to:

- Escape Me Never (play), a British play by Margaret Kennedy
- Escape Me Never (1935 film), a British film adaptation directed by Paul Czinner
- Escape Me Never (1947 film), an American film adaptation directed by Peter Godfrey
