= Escape Me Never (1947 film) =

1947 film by Peter Godfrey

- 1947 film poster
- Directed by: Peter Godfrey
- Written by: Thames Williamson; Leonore Coffee
- Based on: Escape Me Never 1935 play by Margaret Kennedy; The Fool of the Family 1930 novel by Margaret Kennedy
- Produced by: Henry Blanke
- Starring: Errol Flynn; Ida Lupino; Eleanor Parker
- Cinematography: Sol Polito
- Edited by: Clarence Kolster
- Music by: Erich Wolfgang Korngold
- Production company: Warner Bros. Pictures
- Distributed by: Warner Bros. Pictures
- Release date: November 7, 1947
- Running time: 104 minutes
- Country: United States
- Language: English
- Budget: $1,900,000
- Box office: $2.3 million (US rentals) or $1,569,000

Escape Me Never is a 1947 American melodrama film directed by Peter Godfrey, and starring Errol Flynn, Ida Lupino, Eleanor Parker, and Gig Young.

It is the second film adaptation (the first was in 1935) of the 1934 play Escape Me Never by Margaret Kennedy, which was based on her 1930 novel The Fool of the Family. That book was a continuation of her story of the fictional Sanger family of musical geniuses introduced in The Constant Nymph, but there is a disjunct among the books and the films: The Sanger brothers are never mentioned in the 1943 film of The Constant Nymph, and their names are changed in this picture.

== Plot ==
The story takes place in Venice at the turn of the 20th century. A young composer by the name of Caryl Dubrok has a love affair with wealthy English heiress, Fenella MacLean, until her parents mistakenly believe that Caryl is living with young widow Gemma Smith and her baby.

The MacLean family leaves Venice in a hurry, and takes refuge at a safe distance up in the Dolomite mountains. It turns out that Gemma is really living with Caryl's big brother Sebastian, who took pity on the lonely young mother and let her stay with him. Sebastian is set on helping his brother explain the misunderstanding to the MacLeans.

Caryl and Sebastian bring Gemma and her baby along on the trip into the mountains. They survive by singing in the streets for money, since both Caryl and Sebastian are aspiring composers and musicians.

When Caryl hurts his foot one day, Gemma and Sebastian sing alone in the street, and encounter a very beautiful woman whom Sebastian instantly falls for. He is unaware that it is Fenella whom he has met in the street, and starts pursuing her, while Gemma goes back to Caryl.

Thanks to the inspiration Sebastian gets from Fenella's alluring beauty, he composes a music piece as the beginning of a ballet that same night. In the morning, Gemma finds out that it was Fenella they met the night before. To avoid further misunderstandings, Gemma and Sebastian leave, marry, and move to London. Sebastian continues working on the ballet he started in the mountains.

A while later, the MacLean family move back to London, and Caryl follows them, taking a job as a music agent. Caryl and Fenella are soon engaged to be married, but as soon as Sebastian is finished composing his ballet, Fenella arranges for him to perform his piece in London.

When the ballet is a success, Sebastian and Fenella are again acquainted. Sebastian is so busy with rehearsing and perfecting his ballet that he fails to take Gemma to the hospital when her baby is sick. Fenella gets caught up in her relationship with Sebastian, and breaks off her engagement to Caryl.

Fenella and Sebastian spend a weekend at the MacLean's country estate, and are smitten with each other. While they are away, Gemma's baby dies from its illness, and the devastated Gemma vanishes. After the weekend, when Sebastian comes back to London and finds that his wife has disappeared, he is ridden with guilt, realizing how much she meant to him.

Sebastian starts reworking the ballet, inspired by his love for Gemma, and when it is finished, and has its first performance, Gemma comes back to watch it and re-unites with Sebastian.

== Cast ==
- Errol Flynn as Sebastian Dubrok
- Ida Lupino as Gemma Smith
- Eleanor Parker as Fenella MacLean
- Gig Young as Caryl Dubrok
- Reginald Denny as Mr MacLean
- Isobel Elsom as Mrs MacLean
- Albert Bassermann as Professor Heinrich
- Ludwig Stössel as Mr Steinach
- George Zoritch as The Dancer
- Helen Thimig as The Landlady
- Frank Puglia as The Guide
- Frank Reicher as The Minister
- Anthony Caruso as Dino Carbatto
- Doris Lloyd as Mrs. Cooper
- Leonard Mudie as London Doctor
- Milida Mladova as Natrova

== Production ==
The original play was first performed in England in 1933, and on Broadway in 1935. Elisabeth Bergner appeared on stage in a revival of the play in 1942.

In August 1943, Warner Bros. Pictures announced that they would make a film version of the play, as a follow-up to the popular The Constant Nymph. Leonore Coffee was reported as working on the script, with Henry Blanke to produce and Joan Leslie mentioned as a possible star.

Lupino and Flynn were announced for the film in September 1945, with Peter Godfrey attached to direct. Shooting started later that year. It was completed in February 1946.

Lupino sang two songs in the film. She was meant to be billed after Flynn and Parker, but protested and succeeded in being billed after Flynn.

This was the last film to be released with a complete musical score by Erich Wolfgang Korngold, who retired from composing for film in 1947.(Korngold did later adapt the music of Richard Wagner for Republic Pictures' 1955 biography of Wagner, Magic Fire; he wrote some original music for that film as well.)

== Reception ==
=== Box office ===
The film took a while to be released. According to Variety, it earned an estimated $2.3 million in rentals in the US and Canada.

However, Warner Bros records say it earned $1,221,000 domestically, and $348,000 overseas, less than its production budget, causing it to fail to recover its costs.

=== Critical ===
Bosley Crowther, writing for The New York Times, called the film "something harsh and unbelievable, like a terrible faux-pas in a grade-school play". He describes Lupino's performance as "downright embarrassing", and compares Flynn's to a "singing-waiter in a Hoboken café". Crowther gives Eleanor Parker his "deepest sympathy".

Filmink magazine called it the "worst film" Flynn made at Warner Bros, adding that, "If you ever see this, you're likely to wonder (a) how the hell it got made, and (b) what's with all the lederhosen?"
