= The Oracles =

1955 novel

- First edition (UK)
- Author: Margaret Kennedy
- Language: English
- Genre: Comedy
- Publisher: Macmillan (UK); Rinehart (US)
- Publication date: 1955
- Publication place: United Kingdom
- Media type: Print

The Oracles is a 1955 comic novel by the British writer Margaret Kennedy. Kennedy was best known for The Constant Nymph and its sequel The Fool of the Family, but had enjoyed renewed success in the early 1950s, and her previous work Troy Chimneys was awarded the James Tait Black Memorial Prize. It was published in the United States by Rinehart under the alternative title of Act of God.

== Synopsis ==
During a heavy storm, a piece of garden furniture is struck by lightning and twisted out of shape. It comes to rest in the garden of the bohemian artist, convincing everyone that it is a wonderful form of modern sculpture. His intellectual friends he try to convince the council of the provincial English town on the Bristol Channel to purchase it with public funds.

== Bibliography ==
- Hammill, Faye. Women, Celebrity, and Literary Culture Between the Wars. University of Texas Press, 2007.
- Vinson, James. Twentieth-Century Romance and Gothic Writers. Macmillan, 1982.
