= Return I Dare Not =

1931 novel

- First edition
- Author: Margaret Kennedy
- Language: English
- Genre: Drama
- Publisher: Heinemann (UK); Doubleday Doran (US)
- Publication date: 1931
- Publication place: United Kingdom
- Media type: Print

Return I Dare Not is a 1931 novel by the British writer Margaret Kennedy. It was her fifth novel. Although it sold well, it did not match the success of The Constant Nymph and its sequel The Fool of the Family

== Synopsis ==
Hugo Potts, a successful London playwright, is feted by critics and the public and at the centre of social whirl. However works night and day to keep up the personae they expect of him. During an event-packed weekend at a country house he is able to gain a greater sense of himself.

== Bibliography ==
- Ousby, Ian. The Cambridge Paperback Guide to Literature in English. Cambridge University Press, 1996.
- Sponenberg, Ashlie. Encyclopedia of British Women’s Writing 1900–1950. Springer, 2006.
- Vinson, James. Twentieth-Century Romance and Gothic Writers. Macmillan, 1982.
