= Red Sky at Morning (Kennedy novel) =

1927 novel

- First edition (UK)
- Author: Margaret Kennedy
- Cover artist: T. Derrick
- Language: English
- Genre: Drama
- Publisher: Heinemann (UK); Doubleday (US)
- Publication date: 1927
- Publication place: United Kingdom
- Media type: Print

Red Sky at Morning is a 1927 novel by the British writer Margaret Kennedy, her third. Her previous novel The Constant Nymph had been a major critical and commercial success, and it was felt that her new novel failed to recapture this. Sylvia Lynd reviewed it saying "Few novels have so exquisite a forerunner as The Constant Nymph with which to compete. Compared with that, Red Sky at Morning, it must be admitted, is far less moving, less inevitable in the progress of its events, and less well stocked with fascinating characters. Compared with any ordinary novel, however, it is very good indeed - finely wrought, just, sensible, perceptive and witty".

The title is taken from the traditional adage red sky at morning. Kennedy followed it in 1930 with The Fool of the Family , a sequel to The Constant Nymph.

== Synopsis ==
At the turn of the century, twins Emily and William Crowne grow up in privileged comfort at the London home of their poet father. However, when their mother dies and her father flees the country after being caught up in a notorious murder case they are sent to live with their aunt and cousins in the countryside.

== Bibliography ==
- Hammill, Faye. Women, Celebrity, and Literary Culture Between the Wars. University of Texas Press, 2007.
- Stringer, Jenny & Sutherland, John. The Oxford Companion to Twentieth-century Literature in English. Oxford University Press, 1996.
- Vinson, James. Twentieth-Century Romance and Gothic Writers. Macmillan, 1982.
