= Midas Touch (disambiguation) =

The Midas touch is a Greek myth in which King Midas turned anything he touched to gold.

Midas Touch or the Midas Touch may also refer to:

== Film ==
- The Midas Touch (1940 film), a British thriller
- Eldorado (1988 film), also known as The Midas Touch, a Hungarian drama
- The Midas Touch (1997 film), an independent fantasy film
- The Midas Touch (2013 film), a Hong Kong comedy

== Literature ==
- Midas Touch (book), 2011, by Donald Trump and Robert Kiyosaki
- The Midas Touch (novel), 1938, by Margaret Kennedy
- "The Midas Touch", a 1961 Magica De Spell story in the Scrooge McDuck universe
- "The Midas Touch", Green Arrow Volume 1 in dc Comics; see list of The New 52 publications

== Music ==
- Midas Touch Organ Duo, Roger Sayer and Charles Andrews
- Midas Touch (single album), by Kiss of Life, 2024
  - "Midas Touch" (Kiss of Life song), 2024
- "Midas Touch" (Midnight Star song), 1986
- The Midas Touch, a 1980 album by Michael Marra
- Midas Touch, a 2010 album by Peter Howarth
- Midas Touch: The Very Best of The Hollies, a compilation album by The Hollies
- "The Midas Touch", a song from the 1956 musical Bells Are Ringing
- "Midas Touch", a song by Saxon on the 1983 album Power & the Glory
- "Midas Touch", a song by Aurora

== Television ==
- "Midas Touch", an episode of The New Avengers (TV series)
- "The Midas Touch", an episode of The Peter Principle (TV series)
- "The Midas Touch", an episode of Terrahawks

== Other ==
- Midas Touch Golden Elixir, a beer produced by Dogfish Head Brewery
- Midas Touch, a racehorse which came fifth in the 2010 Epsom Derby

== See also ==
- MeidasTouch, an American political action committee
- "Trust the Midas Touch", a slogan for automotive service chain Midas
