= The Ladies of Lyndon =

1923 novel

- First US edition
- Author: Margaret Kennedy
- Language: English
- Genre: Drama
- Publisher: Heinemann 1923 (UK); Doubleday, Page 1925 (US)
- Publication place: United Kingdom
- Media type: Print

The Ladies of Lyndon is a 1923 novel by the British writer Margaret Kennedy. Her debut novel, it was well-received and she followed it the next year with her breakthrough novel The Constant Nymph.

== Synopsis ==
The novel follows the lives of a number of women connected with the country estate of Lyndon in the years leading up to and during the First World War. Encouraged by her mother Agatha marries the owner Sir John Clewer after a brief affair with her cousin, the doctor, Gerald Blair. When he returns after sometime away it reawakens her passions. Meanwhile Sir John's younger brother James marries one of the maids.

== Bibliography ==
- Hartley, Cathy. A Historical Dictionary of British Women. Routledge, 2013.
- Sponenberg, Ashlie. Encyclopedia of British Women’s Writing 1900–1950. Springer, 2006.
- Vinson, James. Twentieth-Century Romance and Gothic Writers. Macmillan, 1982.
- Stringer, Jenny & Sutherland, John. The Oxford Companion to Twentieth-century Literature in English. Oxford University Press, 1996.
