= Lucy Carmichael (novel) =

1951 novel

- First US edition
- Author: Margaret Kennedy
- Language: English
- Genre: Drama
- Publisher: Macmillan (UK); Rinehart (US)
- Publication date: 1951
- Publication place: United Kingdom
- Media type: Print

Lucy Carmichael is a 1951 romantic drama novel by the British writer Margaret Kennedy. It was her tenth published novel. It was well-received by critics but did not repeat the success of her earlier hits The Constant Nymph and Escape Me Never. It was a Literary Guild choice in America. In 2011 it was reissued by Faber and Faber.

Her next novel Troy Chimneys was awarded the James Tait Black Memorial Prize for 1953.

== Synopsis ==
After Lucy Carmichael is jilted at the altar she slowly rebuilds her life by taking a job at an educational institute in rural Lincolnshire.

== Bibliography ==
- Hammill, Faye. Women, Celebrity, and Literary Culture Between the Wars. University of Texas Press, 2007.
- Hartley, Cathy. A Historical Dictionary of British Women. Routledge, 2013.
- Vinson, James. Twentieth-Century Romance and Gothic Writers. Macmillan, 1982.
- Stringer, Jenny & Sutherland, John. The Oxford Companion to Twentieth-century Literature in English. Oxford University Press, 1996.
