= Griffith Jones (actor) =

English actor (1909–2007)

- Born: Harold Jones; 19 November 1909; Notting Hill, London, England
- Died: 30 January 2007 (aged 97); London, England
- Occupation: Actor
- Years active: 1929–2000
- Spouse: Irene Isaac (m. 1932; died 1985)
- Children: Gemma Jones; Nicholas Jones

Griffith Jones (born Harold Jones; 19 November 1909 – 30 January 2007) was an Anglo-Welsh film, stage and television actor.

== Early life ==
Born in Notting Hill, London, on 19 November 1909, Jones was the 5th child of Welsh-speaking dairy owner and former lead miner William Thomas Jones and Harriet Eleanor J. Doughty (1878–1973). In 1930, he was studying law at University College London when Kenneth Barnes, the Principal of the Royal Academy of Dramatic Art, noticed him in a student performance and offered him a career as an actor. His first professional engagement was in Carpet Slippers at the Embassy Theatre, Swiss Cottage, in 1930, while still at RADA. He won the annual RADA Gold Medal in 1932.

== Career ==
His first West End production was Vile Bodies at the Vaudeville and Richard of Bordeaux (in which he appeared with John Gielgud) at the New Theatre. The following year he appeared with Laurence Olivier in The Rats of Norway. In 1932, he made his film debut, in The Faithful Heart, and he continued to appear in British films throughout the 1930s. He achieved success on the London stage and on Broadway as "Caryl Sanger" in the play, Escape Me Never, with Elisabeth Bergner, and also starred with her in the 1935 film version.

In 1940, he joined the British Army, but spent most of the Second World War in a touring concert party, returning to the West End in 1945 to star in Lady Windermere's Fan. He then became a fairly big star of the British cinema in the late 1940s, showing a particular talent for comedies. He was the leading man in a number of films, including Miranda (1948), opposite Glynis Johns and Googie Withers, and Once Upon a Dream (1949), opposite Withers again. He was mainly seen in supporting roles from the mid-1950s onwards, among the most prominent being in the film The Sea Shall Not Have Them (1954). He still played occasional lead roles, notably as a man who is framed for murder in The Scarlet Web (1954) and as a husband who tries to have his wife murdered in the crime thriller Kill Her Gently (1957).

== Royal Shakespeare Company ==
He was a stalwart of the Royal Shakespeare Company, appearing in 50 productions with the company between 1975 and 1999.

His first season was in director Buzz Goodbody's noted opening year at The Other Place theatre, playing the Ghost to Ben Kingsley's Hamlet and Sir William Stanley in Perkin Warbeck. His later roles included Duncan, opposite Ian McKellen, in Macbeth, Antigonus in The Winter's Tale, Aegeon in A Comedy of Errors, Gower in Pericles, Prince of Tyre, The Comedy of Errors, Chebutiken and Ferrapont in separate productions of Chekhov's Three Sisters and Tim Linkinwater and Fluggers in Nicholas Nickleby.

His last role, at the age of 90, was Tubal in The Merchant of Venice.

== Personal life and death ==
Jones was married to actress Irene Isaac (known as "Robin") from 1932 until her death in 1985. They had two children, who both became actors: Gemma Jones (who was named after the main character in Escape Me Never) and Nicholas Jones.

Jones died in his sleep from natural causes at his home in London, England, on 30 January 2007, aged 97.

== Selected filmography ==
- The Faithful Heart (1932) – (uncredited)
- Money Talks (1932) – Jimmy Dale, the Kid's rival
- The Rise of Catherine the Great (1934) – Grigory Orlov
- Leave It to Blanche (1934) – Philip Amesbury
- Escape Me Never (1935) – Caryl Sanger
- First a Girl (1935) – Robert
- Line Engaged (1935) – Minor Role (uncredited)
- The Mill on the Floss (1936) – Stephen Guest
- The Wife of General Ling (1937) – John Fenton
- Return of a Stranger (1937) – James Martin
- A Yank at Oxford (1938) – Paul Beaumont
- The Four Just Men (1939) – James Brodie
- Young Man's Fancy (1939) – Lord Alban
- Atlantic Ferry (1941) – David MacIver
- This Was Paris (1942) – Capt. Bill Hamilton, MI5
- The Day Will Dawn (1942) – Police Inspector Gunter
- Uncensored (1942) – Father de Gruyte
- Henry V (1944) – Earl of Salisbury
- The Wicked Lady (1945) – Sir Ralph
- The Rake's Progress (1945) – Sandy Duncan
- They Made Me a Fugitive (1947) – Narcy
- Miranda (1948) – Dr. Paul Martin
- Good-Time Girl (1948) – Danny Martin
- Look Before You Love (1948) – Charles Kent
- Once Upon a Dream (1949) – Jackson
- Honeymoon Deferred (1951) – David Fry
- Star of My Night (1954) – Michael Donovan
- The Scarlet Web (1954) – Jake Winter
- The Sea Shall Not Have Them (1954) – Group Capt. Todd
- Face in the Night (1957) – Rapson
- Account Rendered (1957) – Robert Ainsworth
- The Truth About Women (1957) – Sir Jeremy
- Not Wanted on Voyage (1957) – Guy Harding
- Kill Her Gently (1957) – Jeff Martin
- Hidden Homicide (1959) – Michael Cornforth
- The Crowning Touch (1959) – Mark
- Strangler's Web (1966) – Jackson Delacorte
- Decline and Fall... of a Birdwatcher (1968) – Sir Humphrey Maltravers

== Selected television ==
- The New Adventures of Martin Kane (1957) – Widerum, Episode: "The Swindle Story"
- Dial 999 (1958) – Paul Grant, Episode: "The Big Fish"
- The Invisible Man (1959) – Lucian Currie, Episode: "Strange Partners"
- Maigret (1961) – Dr. Bellamy, Episode: "On Holiday"
- Danger Man (1965) – Sir Noel Blanchard, Episode: "The Black Book"
- Man in a Suitcase (1968) – Frank Arnoldson, Episode: "Why They Killed Nolan"
- The Persuaders! (1971) – Lars Seelman, Episode: "The Morning After"

== Selected stage credits ==
- Gertie Maude by John Van Druten (1937)
- The Moonraker by Arthur Watkyn (1952)
