= The Constant Nymph (play) =

1926 play

Noël Coward as Lewis Dodd and Edna Best as Teresa Sanger, 1926

The Constant Nymph is a play based on the 1924 novel of the same name by Margaret Kennedy. The stage version, adapted by Kennedy and the director Basil Dean, was first performed in London in 1926, starring Noël Coward, Edna Best and Cathleen Nesbitt. It portrays the love of two women for a young composer, and the conflicts that arise. The tragic ending has the younger of the two – a teenager – die of heart failure.

== Background and premiere ==
Kennedy's novel, published in 1924, was a critical and popular success. The Times described it as "a beautiful piece of craftsmanship, built with rare firmness and economy … a genuine work of art". For the West End premiere of the stage adaptation, John Gielgud was cast in the central role of Lewis Dodd, but before rehearsals began, the producer and director, Basil Dean, found that Noël Coward – then a bigger star than the young Gielgud – was available, and he demoted Gielgud to the position of understudy. Coward's health gave way three weeks after the premiere, and Gielgud took over the part for the rest of the run. (Note: Gielgud had an enforceable contractual claim to the role, but Dean, a notorious bully, was a powerful force in British theatre, and Gielgud was intimidated into acquiescence.)

The play opened at the New Theatre (since 2006 retitled the Noël Coward Theatre) on 14 September 1926. Music plays an important part in the play, and Dean commissioned a score by Eugene Goossens. The first night was attended by authors including Arnold Bennett, John Galsworthy, Somerset Maugham and H. G. Wells. The production ran for nearly a year, before going on tour.

The original cast was:

- Lewis Dodd – Noël Coward
- Linda Cowland – Mary Clare
- Kate Sanger – Marie Ney
- Kiril Trigorin – Aubrey Mather
- Teresa Sanger – Edna Best
- Paulina Sanger – Helen Spencer
- Jacob Birnbaum – Kenneth Kent
- Antonia Sanger – Elissa Landi
- Roberto – Tony de Lungo
- Florence Churchill – Cathleen Nesbitt
- Charles Churchill – Cecil Parker
- Sir Barthelmy Pugh – Aubrey Mather
- Peveril Leyburn – Harold Scott
- Erda Leyburn – Margaret Steveking
- Dr Dawson – Craighall Sherry
- Lydia Mainwaring – Marjorie Gabain
- Major Robert Mainwaring – David Hawthorne
- Madame Marxse – Margaret Yarde

== Plot ==
Lewis Dodd is a young composer. His late mentor, Albert Sanger, (Note: The character appears in the original novel, before dying of a heart attack; in the dramatised version he is already dead before the action begins.) had several daughters, one of whom, the teenage schoolgirl Teresa, suffers from a heart defect. She is in love with Lewis, but he falls for her cousin, Florence Churchill, who, after Albert's death, comes to look after the anarchic Sanger family. Lewis and Florence marry, but the marriage is full of tensions, and she is well aware, as he is not, until later in the play, of Teresa's feelings for him. Florence's conflict between her concerned instincts towards her cousins and her controlling instincts, possessiveness and snobbery is a key point of the plot. Lewis come to realise his love for Teresa, but she dies of heart failure, leaving him bereft.

=== Critical reception ===
The Times thought the adaptation well done, but regretted that turning the novel into a play necessarily removed some of its subtleties and ambiguities. The paper's reviewer found that the anarchic Sangers and Dodd were shown in a more unequivocally favourable light than in the novel and the unkind aspects of Florence's nature portrayed more strongly than her kindnesses. The Stage thought much less of the novel than did The Times ("cannot be classed much above … Ethel M. Dell"), and found the dramatisation "episodical in treatment", though the reviewer predicted a popular success. The Era called the play "one of those rare events in the theatre, a really satisfactory and satisfying dramatisation of a novel … there is not a trace of sentimentality".

== Notes, references and sources ==
=== Sources ===
- Croall, Jonathan (2000). Gielgud – A Theatrical Life, 1904–2000. London: Methuen. ISBN 978-0-413-74560-6.
- Gielgud, John (2000) [1939 and 1989]. Gielgud on Gielgud – volume comprising reprints of Early Stages and Backward Glances. London: Hodder and Stoughton. ISBN 978-0-340-79502-6.
