= Autumn (play) =

1937 British play

Autumn is a 1937 British play co-written by Margaret Kennedy and Gregory Ratoff. It was inspired by a 1915 play by the Russian writer Ilya Surguchev. After premiering at the Manchester Opera House, its initial West End run at St Martin's Theatre lasted for 161 performances between 15 October 1937 and 5 March 1938. The original cast included Wyndham Goldie, Flora Robson, Jack Hawkins and Victoria Hopper, while the future star Stewart Granger was an understudy. It was produced by the theatrical impresario Basil Dean.

In 1949 the play was adapted into film That Dangerous Age directed by Ratoff and starring Myrna Loy and Richard Greene.

== Bibliography ==
- Wearing, J.P. The London Stage 1930-1939: A Calendar of Productions, Performers, and Personnel. Rowman & Littlefield, 2014.
