= The Mill on the Floss (film) =

- Movie poster
- Directed by: Tim Whelan
- Written by: George Eliot (novel); Garnett Weston; Austin Melford; Tim Whelan; John Drinkwater
- Produced by: John Clein
- Starring: Geraldine Fitzgerald; Frank Lawton; Victoria Hopper; Fay Compton; Griffith Jones; James Mason; Sam Livesey
- Cinematography: Hone Glendinning; John Stumar
- Edited by: John Datlowe; Cecil H. Williamson
- Music by: Colin Wark
- Production company: G.B. Morgan Productions
- Distributed by: National Provincial Film Distributors
- Release date: 31 December 1936
- Running time: 95 minutes
- Country: United Kingdom
- Language: English

The Mill on the Floss is a 1936 British drama film directed by Tim Whelan and starring Frank Lawton, Victoria Hopper, Geraldine Fitzgerald and James Mason. It was based on the 1860 novel The Mill on the Floss by George Eliot.

The film was made at Shepperton Studios. Although he is not credited in the film, Basil Dean, who was married to the leading lady Victoria Hopper, was heavily involved in the planning and the production of the film.

== Cast ==
- Frank Lawton as Philip Wakem
- Victoria Hopper as Lucy Deane
- Fay Compton as Mrs Tulliver
- Geraldine Fitzgerald as Maggie
- Griffith Jones as Stephen Guest
- Mary Clare as Mrs Moss
- James Mason as Tom Tulliver
- Athene Seyler as Mrs Pullet
- Sam Livesey as Mr Tulliver
- Amy Veness as Mrs Deane
- Felix Aylmer as Mr Wakem
- Eliot Makeham as Mr Pullet
- William Devlin as Bob Jakin
- Ivor Barnard as Mr Moss
- David Horne as Mr Deane
- O. B. Clarence as Mr. Gore
- W.E. Holloway as D. Stelling
- Arthur West Payne as Young Bob Jakin
- Cecil Ramage as Luke
- Eldon Gorst as young Tom

== Home media ==
The Mill on the Floss was released on Region 0 DVD-R by Alpha Video on 28 January 2014.

== Bibliography ==
- Harper, Graeme & Rayner, Jonathan R. Cinema and Landscape. Intellect Books, 2010.
