= Lucy Carmichael =

Lucy Carmichael may refer to:

- Lucy Carmichael, the main character played by Lucille Ball in the TV series The Lucy Show
- Lucy Carmichael (novel), a 1951 novel by Margaret Kennedy
