= Wyndham Goldie =

British actor (1897–1957)

- in Crime Unlimited (1935)
- Born: Frank Wyndham Goldie; 5 July 1897; Rochester, Kent, England, United Kingdom of Great Britain and Ireland
- Died: 26 September 1957 (aged 60); London, England, United Kingdom
- Occupation: Actor
- Years active: 1934–1957 (film)

Frank Wyndham Goldie (5 July 1897 – 26 September 1957) was an English actor.

== World War I ==
During World War I, Goldie was a lieutenant in the Royal Marine Light Infantry. His elder brother Maurice also held a commission in the same Corps during the war.

== Acting career ==
Goldie came to prominence as an actor at the Liverpool Playhouse from 1927 until summer 1934, the last year during which he also directed plays. In 1937 he starred in Margaret Kennedy's play Autumn in the West End.

== Personal life ==
He was married to the television producer Grace Wyndham Goldie.

== Partial filmography ==
- Lorna Doone (1934) as Chief Judge Jeffries (London)
- Man of the Moment (1935) as Jason Randall
- Crime Unlimited (1935) as Conway Addison
- The Black Mask (1935) as Davidson
- Under the Red Robe (1937) as Edmond, Duke of Fiox
- Victoria the Great (1937) as Cecil Rhodes
- The Last Chance (1937) as John Worrall
- The Return of Carol Deane (1938) as Francis Scott-Vaughan
- Sixty Glorious Years (1938) as Arthur J. Balfour
- Old Bones of the River (1938) as Commissioner Sanders
- Inspector Hornleigh on Holiday (1939) as Sir George Winbeck
- The Arsenal Stadium Mystery (1939) as Kindilett
- The Girl in the News (1940) as Edward Bentley
- Night Train to Munich (1940) as Charles Dryton
- Seven Days to Noon (1950) as Rev. Burgess
- Doctor in the House (1954) as Examiner (uncredited)
- Child's Play (1954) as Director Atomic Research
- The Secret (1955) as Doctor Scott
- Brothers in Law (1957) as Mr. Smith
- The Strange World of Planet X (1958) as Brigadier Cartwright (final film role)

== Bibliography ==
- Low, Rachael. History of the British Film: Filmmaking in 1930s Britain. George Allen & Unwin, 1985 .
