= Mary Clare =

British actress (1892–1970)

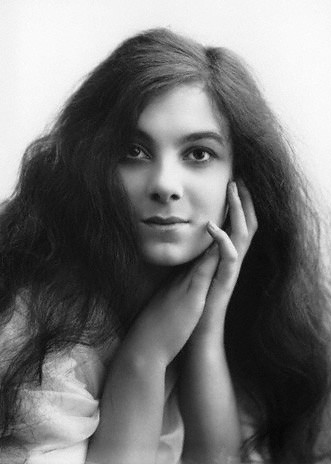
- Born: Mary Clare Absalom; 17 July 1892; Lambeth, London, England
- Died: 29 August 1970 (aged 78); Harrow, London, England
- Occupation: Actress
- Years active: 1910–1959
- Spouse: Lionel Percival Mawhood (m. 1915)
- Children: 2

Mary Clare Absalom (17 July 1892 – 29 August 1970) was a British actress of stage, film and television.

== Biography ==
Daughter of George Alfred Absalom, Clare was educated at Wood Green secondary school, first worked in an office but a loan of £50 allowed her to train at a dramatic school and she began her thespian career on the London stage at the age of 18 in 1910, following which she spent two years touring the provinces to appear back in London in "A Posy on a Ring" at the Earl's Court Exhibition Theatre. She made her London West End debut in Turandot at the St James's Theatre in 1913, following which she appeared in many West End productions.

In the theatre, she became one of Noël Coward's "leading ladies" appearing in several of his plays, in particular, Cavalcade in 1931. In September 1936 she played the leading role in the play Laura Garnett, by Leslie and Sewell Stokes, at the Arts Theatre Club, London and played the lead role of the victim in Agatha Christie's 1945 play Appointment with Death. In 1960, she appeared in Noël Coward's 50th play Waiting in the Wings with Sybil Thorndike.

In films, she was mainly a character actress, in later life often portraying mature ladies who had strength of character or were autocratic. She appeared in several silent films including the film The Black Spider in 1920, and thereafter divided her time between the stage and the cinema. In April 1927, she appeared in Packing Up, a short film produced in the DeForest Phonofilm sound-on-film process; the short featured Malcolm Keen and was directed by Miles Mander. Her first major sound film was in the 1931 Hindle Wakes, as Mrs Jeffcote; a role which she was to repeat in the 1952 remake.

In 1938, she was featured opposite Robert Donat and Rosalind Russell in The Citadel. She appeared in two of the British-made Alfred Hitchcock films, Young and Innocent, (1937) playing a nightmare of an aunt who demands that everyone enjoy themselves at her young daughter's birthday party, and The Lady Vanishes, (1938) in which she played a sinister baroness; two vastly different characters. She played the part of Linda Sanger in two different versions of The Constant Nymph and had previously been in the stage version.

Whilst Mary Clare played many leading roles, her only "title" role was as the very eccentric detective Palmyra Pym in the 1940 film Mrs. Pym of Scotland Yard that also featured Nigel Patrick and Irene Handl.

In 1956, she was in several TV episodes in British television.

== Personal life ==
Clare lived at Brunswick Square, Bloomsbury. In 1915, she married Lieutenant Lionel Percival Mawhood, of the Royal Inniskilling Fusiliers; they had a son and a daughter. Their son, RAF Wing Commander David Vere George Mawhood, OBE, married Margaret Mary St John, a descendant of John St John, 11th Baron St John of Bletso. Daughter Rozanne was educated at RADA, and acted on stage before the Second World War as Anne Clare.

== Partial filmography ==
- The Black Spider (1920)
- The Skin Game (1921)
- A Gipsy Cavalier (1922)
- Lights of London (1923) as Hetty Preene
- The Constant Nymph (1928) as Linda Sanger
- The Feather (1929)
- Hindle Wakes (1931) as Mrs. Jeffcote
- Many Waters (1931)
- Keepers of Youth (1931)
- Bill's Legacy (1931)
- The Outsider (1931)
- Shadows (1931)
- Carmen (1931)
- The Constant Nymph (1933) as Linda Sanger
- Say It with Flowers (1934) as Kate Bishop
- Lorna Doone (1934) Mistress Sara Ridd
- The Night Club Queen (1934)
- The Clairvoyant (The Evil Mind) (1935) as Mother
- The Guv'nor (1935)
- A Real Bloke (1935)
- The Passing of the Third Floor Back (1935)
- The Mill on the Floss (1937)
- Young and Innocent (1937) as Aunt Margaret
- The Lady Vanishes (1938) as Isabel Nisatona
- Climbing High (1938) as Lady Emily Westaker
- Mrs. Pym of Scotland Yard (1939) as Mrs. Pym
- On the Night of the Fire (1939) as Lizzie Crane
- There Ain't No Justice (1939)
- Miss Grant Goes to the Door (1940) as Caroline Grant
- Old Bill and Son (1941) as Maggie
- This Man Is Dangerous (1941) as Matron
- The Next of Kin (1942) as Mrs. Webster
- The Night Has Eyes (1942)
- The Hundred Pound Window (1944)
- Fiddlers Three (1944) as Volumnia
- London Town (1946) as Mrs. Gates
- Mrs. Fitzherbert (1947)
- The Three Weird Sisters (1948) as Maude Morgan-Vaughan
- Oliver Twist (1948) as Mrs. Corney
- Esther Waters (1948) as Mrs Latch
- Portrait of Clare (1950)
- The Black Rose (1950) as Eloner of Lensford
- Moulin Rouge (1952) as Madame Louet
- The Beggar's Opera (1953) as Mrs. Peachum
- The Price of Silence (1960) as Mrs. West

== Selected stage credits ==
- The Likes of Her by Charles McEvoy (1923)
- The Return of the Soldier by John Van Druten (1928)
