= Bruce Graeme =

British mystery writer (1900–1982)

Graham Montague Jeffries, better known by his pseudonym Bruce Graeme, (23 May 1900 – 14 May 1982) was a British mystery writer with a prolific output of more than 100 novels. Graeme's son, the writer Roderic Jeffries (known under the pseudonym Roderic Graeme), continued writing novels using one of Bruce Graeme's most beloved characters, the anti-hero crime solving thief Blackshirt, which originally featured in a series of Blackshirt novels written by the elder Jeffries from 1923 through 1940.

== Life and career ==
Graham Montague Jeffries was born into an affluent family in London, England on 23 May 1900. He was educated at private academies and served in the Queen's Westminsters during World War I. He married Lorna Louch in 1925 and with her had a son and a daughter. He worked as a journalist for the Middlesex County Times.

Jeffries's son, the writer Roderic Jeffries, continued writing novels using one of Bruce Graeme's most beloved characters, the anti-hero crime solving thief Blackshirt, which originally featured a series of Blackshirt novels written by the elder Jeffries from 1923 through 1940. The elder Jeffries also authored two different series of books featuring relatives of his character Blackshirt: the Monsieur Blackshirt series (1933–1938) about an ancestor generations in the past, and Lord Blackshirt (1941–1943) featuring the original Blackshirt's son.

Bruce Graeme also penned a series of novels featuring the detectives William Stevens and Pierre Allain published between 1931 and 1943; a series of books following the amateur sleuth Theodore I. Terhune (1941–1951); and a series of novels featuring Inspector Auguste Jantry (1946–1952). At the end of his career several novels featuring Detective Sergeant Robert Mather (1970–1980).

Jeffries's novels were the basis for eight film adaptations of his work and for one episode of the television anthology series Orson Welles Great Mysteries. The 1935 film The Black Mask was based on the Blackshirt novels. Other films adapted from mystery novels penned by Jeffries included The Hate Ship (1929), Ten Days in Paris (1940), The Eye & the Ear (1945), Dial 999 (1955), Face in the Night (1957), Out of the Fog (1962), and the Polish short film Marynarz polski - Dzieje przecietnego czlowieka (1943). He was also periodically active as a film producer.

In 1953 Jeffries was a founding member of the Crime Writers' Association. He died on 14 May 1982 at age of 81.
