= Black Mask (1935 film) =

1935 British film by Ralph Ince

- Aileen Marson in the film
- Directed by: Ralph Ince
- Written by: Bruce Graeme (novel); Michael Barringer; Paul Gangelin; Frank Launder
- Produced by: Irving Asher
- Starring: Wylie Watson; Aileen Marson; Ellis Irving
- Cinematography: Basil Emmott
- Production company: Warner Bros.
- Distributed by: Warner Bros.
- Release date: December 1935
- Running time: 67 minutes
- Country: United Kingdom
- Language: English

Black Mask is a lost 1935 British crime film directed by Ralph Ince and starring Wylie Watson, Aileen Marson and Ellis Irving. It was written by Michael Barringer, Paul Gangelin and Frank Launder based on a novel by Bruce Graeme.

== Preservation status ==
The British Film Institute has classed Black Mask as a lost film. Its National Archive holds a collection of stills but no film or video materials.

== Plot ==
"Mr. Blank" is a Robin Hood-like figure who, assisted by sleight-of-hand expert Jimmie Glass, extorts money from his wealthy but mean acquaintances, and gives it to charity. When the host of gala evening is found murdered and his safe robbed, Mr Blank is the prime suspect. However, he succeeds in unmasking the real murderer.

== Cast ==
- Wylie Watson as Jimmie Glass
- Aileen Marson as Jean McTavish
- Ellis Irving as Verrell
- Wyndham Goldie as Davidson
- Joyce Kennedy as Lady McTavish
- Herbert Lomas as Sir John McTavish
- John Turnbull as Inspector Murray
- Kate Cutler as Lady Mincott

== Production ==
The film was made at Teddington Studios as a quota quickie by Warner Bros.' British subsidiary with sets designed by the studio's resident art director Peter Proud.

== Reception ==
The Daily Film Renter wrote: "Sound treatment, but situations generally far-fetched and characterisations mostly unconvincing. Acceptable comedy relief by Wylie Watson as sleight-of-hand expert."

The Monthly Film Bulletin wrote: "The film is never tense, and relies for its success more on its humour than on its elements of mystery. Wylie Watson, as the sleight-of-hand expert, is slow at first, but later acquires more assurance, and is at his funniest impersonating an undertaker in order to obtain access to the murdered man's house. Ellis Irving, as Mr. Blank, looks the embodiment of modern chivalry, and we know that we cannot suspect him of any such low act as murder; the rest of the cast is effortlessly competent."

Kine Weekly wrote: "Romantic comedy crime drama which attempts with indifferent success to revive interest in the Raffles formula. The story is not entirely without possibilities, but its punch is dissipated by slipshod direction and indifferent timing. All too frequently the serious unwittingly is converted via the slapstick to the dire detriment of the entertainment as a whole."

Picturegoer wrote: "Poor treatment is mainly responsible for the ineffectiveness of this crime drama, which had possibilities that remain unexploited. ... Ellis Irving is weak as Verrell, but the support is not bad, what honours there are being taken by Wylie Watson as Jimmie. As a whole the picture provides very mediocre entertainment."
