= The Midas Touch (1940 film) =

- Judy Kelly and Barry K. Barnes in the film.
- Directed by: David MacDonald
- Written by: Brock Williams; Cyrus Wood
- Based on: The Midas Touch by Margaret Kennedy
- Produced by: Samuel Sax
- Starring: Barry K. Barnes; Judy Kelly; Frank Cellier
- Cinematography: Basil Emmott
- Edited by: Bert Bates
- Music by: Bretton Byrd
- Production company: Warner Brothers
- Distributed by: Warner Brothers
- Release date: 4 May 1940
- Running time: 68 minutes
- Country: United Kingdom
- Language: English
- Budget: £20,480
- Box office: £15,726

The Midas Touch is a 1940 British second feature ('B') thriller film directed by David MacDonald and starring Barry K. Barnes, Judy Kelly, Frank Cellier and Bertha Belmore. It was written by Brock Williams and Cyrus Wood, adapted from the 1938 novel of the same title by Margaret Kennedy.

It was made at Teddington Studios by Warner Brothers. The film's sets were designed by Norman G. Arnold.

== Preservation status ==
The British Film Institute National Archive holds a collection of stills but no film or video materials.

== Plot ==
Welsh industrial tycoon Corris Morgan is married to Ellie, but also in love with Lydia Brenton, who does not reciprocate. A youngnan named Evan Jones meets Lydia, who helps him to become Corris's secretary. To Corris's annoyance, Ellie has an interest in clairvoyance, and when she invites medium Mrs Carter-Blake to the house, Corris throws her out. As she leaves she foretells that Corris and his son will die in a motor accident. Corris indeed dies. It turns out that Evan is Corris's son by his first marriage, and he and Lydia find happiness together.

== Cast ==
- Barry K. Barnes as Evan Jones
- Judy Kelly as Lydia Brenton
- Frank Cellier as Corris Morgan
- Bertha Belmore as Mrs Carter-Blake
- Eileen Erskine as Rosalie
- Philip Friend as David Morgan
- Scott Harrold as Harkness
- Iris Hoey as Ellie Morgan
- Anna Konstam as Mamie
- Evelyn Roberts as Major Arnold

== Reception ==
The Monthly Film Bulletin wrote: "Frank Cellier gives real power to Corris Morgan, and Iris Hoey makes Ellie the true shallow sensation seeker. The climax is not sufficiently stressed, the film beginning better than it ends."

Kine Weekly wrote: "The cast and the treatment do not always measure up to the demands of the theme, but although the film is at times at cross-purposes with reason as well as with itself, it still has in its varied surface action and feminine appeal, kindled by its contact with the supernatural, much that can be considered popular entertainment."
