= Crime Unlimited =

1935 British film by Ralph Ince

- Directed by: Ralph Ince
- Written by: Brock Williams; Ralph Smart
- Based on: Crime Unlimited; 1933 novel by David Hume
- Produced by: Irving Asher (uncredited)
- Starring: Esmond Knight; Lilli Palmer
- Cinematography: Basil Emmott
- Edited by: Bert Bates
- Production company: Warner Bros./First National
- Release date: September 1935
- Running time: 71-72 minutes
- Country: United Kingdom
- Language: English

Crime Unlimited is a 1935 British crime film directed by Ralph Ince and starring Esmond Knight and Lilli Palmer. It was written by Brock Williams and Ralph Smart based on the 1933 novel of the same title by David Hume, and produced as a quota quickie. The film marked the English-language debut of Lilli Palmer.

== Plot ==
The Maddick commit a diamond robbery and murder a police officer investigating their crimes. A paper with the cryptic writing "AD 1935" is found on the murdered officer's body. Outsmarted by the gang, the police assistant commissioner and Inspector Cardby assign Pete Borden, a new recruit whom the gang would not know, to act undercover and join the gang.

When Pete enters a casino, Natascha is sent to greet him. He pretends to be looking for a fence to sell his stolen jewelry. Reassured, the gang recruits him. Maddick (the gang's mysterious leader who never lets anyone see him in person) first assigns him to check on Delaney, a crooked bookie. Pete then meets Newell, a lawyer. The gang installs Pete in a flat and he tosses a note containing the address to a policeman when no one is looking. Two police detectives let the flat opposite. One of them is deaf, equipped with binoculars and can read Pete's lips when he silently mouths what he has discovered.

The gang plans to steal the necklace of prominent socialite Lady Mead at a party. Pete arrives at the party with Natascha, while the police attend the party undercover and send Lady Sybil, a society gossip columnist, to observe. At the party, Pete meets Conway Addison, a lawyer. The lights are extinguished, and when they are restored, Natascha has escaped with the stolen necklace. Inspector Cardby pretends to arrest Pete, but lets him go once they are outside.

Natascha later visits Pete and tells him that she wants to leave the gang, but one of the crooks is eavesdropping. She claims that Maddick sent her to test Pete. The gangster checks with his boss and discovers that she was lying.

With his plans known to the police, Maddick suspects Pete. This suspicion is confirmed when the police notify the next target, who notifies Maddick. The mastermind pretends to accept Pete's proposal for a robbery. However, while the police are waiting for them there, the gang strike elsewhere.

Pete is taken to an isolated country house. Maddick finally allows Pete to see him, as he intends to kill him, and Maddick is revealed to be Addison, who began a life of crime after becoming bored with his job. While Natascha is being taken to the same place, she causes the car to veer from the road. She then tells a police officer where she had been heading. To avoid alerting Maddick, she appears at the house. Maddick, having decided to retire, tries to gas the whole gang, Pete and Natasha to cover his tracks. However, Pete manages to escape from the locked room, and the police arrive in time to shoot Conway and arrest the rest of his gang.

== Cast ==
- Esmond Knight as Pete Borden
- Lilli Palmer as Natasha
- Cecil Parker as Assistant Commissioner
- George Merritt as Detective Inspector Cardby
- Richard Grey as Detective Inspector Hall
- Raymond Lovell as Delaney
- Graham Soutten as Clancy (as Ben Soutten)
- Peter Gawthorne as A. D. Newall
- Wyndham Goldie as Conway Addison
- Jane Millican as Lady Sybil
- Stella Arbenina as Lady Mead
- Bellenden Clarke as Lord Mead

== Reception ==
The Monthly Film Bulletin wrote: "The script and the direction hurry along in pursuit of big action effects without any attempt at the details which would ensure credible atmosphere or characters, and cheerfully commitling a glaring faux pas in the cause of audience-deception. The denouement is consequently quite unacceptable, even allowing for the attempt to make it macabre."

Kine Weekly wrote: "Rousing crime melodrama, vigorous, popular 'G-men' stuff, with a refreshing English setting. The plot, written with hearty extravagance, is supercharged with excitement, and it runs its course at an exhilarating pace, accompanied for the major part of its journey by healthy romance. Good, agreeably aggressive showmanship marks the treatment, while the spectacular climax carries mighty punch."

The Daily Film Renter wrote: "There is no shortage of excitement in this latest example of the crook melodrama ... Smoothly directed, the film works up to a gripping climax. ... Esmond Knight is a pleasing hero, with Lilli Palmer making a most promising talkie debut as Natascha. Here, it seems, is an artiste with the requisite glamour for a big screen career."

TV Guide described the film as a "pedestrian picture" and a "totally undistinguished film."
