= The Midas Touch (novel) =

1938 novel

- First edition (UK)
- Author: Margaret Kennedy
- Language: English
- Genre: Drama
- Publisher: Cassell (UK); Random House (US)
- Publication date: 1938
- Publication place: United Kingdom
- Media type: Print

The Midas Touch is a 1938 novel by the British writer Margaret Kennedy. It was her eighth novel, she then took a decade-long break before producing her next work The Feast in 1949. It was a Daily Mail Book of the Month.

== Synopsis ==
Evan Jones, a charismatic young Welshman used to living off his wits arrives in London and falls into the orbit of Corris Morgan, a business tycoon and Bessie Carter Blake a fraudulent psychic.

== Film adaptation ==
In 1940 it was adapted into a film of the same title directed by David MacDonald and starring Barry K. Barnes, Judy Kelly and Frank Cellier.

== Bibliography ==
- Goble, Alan. The Complete Index to Literary Sources in Film. Walter de Gruyter, 1999.
- Hartley, Cathy. A Historical Dictionary of British Women. Routledge, 2013.
- Vinson, James. Twentieth-Century Romance and Gothic Writers. Macmillan, 1982.
- Stringer, Jenny & Sutherland, John. The Oxford Companion to Twentieth-century Literature in English. Oxford University Press, 1996.
