= Face in the Night =

1957 British film by Lance Comfort

- U.S. poster
- Directed by: Lance Comfort
- Written by: Bruce Graeme (novel); Norman Hudis; John Sherman
- Produced by: Charles Leeds; Steven Pallos
- Starring: Griffith Jones; Lisa Gastoni; Vincent Ball; Eddie Byrne
- Cinematography: Arthur Graham
- Edited by: Peter Pitt
- Music by: Richard Rodney Bennett
- Production company: Gibraltar Films
- Distributed by: Grand National Pictures; United Artists (US)
- Release date: June 1957
- Running time: 78 minutes
- Country: United Kingdom
- Language: English

Face in the Night, released in the US as Menace in the Night, is a 1957 British second feature crime film directed by Lance Comfort and starring Griffith Jones, Lisa Gastoni and Vincent Ball. It was written by Norman Hudis and John Sherman based on the 1953 novel Suspense by Bruce Graeme.

== Plot ==
Jean Francis witnesses a mail-bag robbery by a criminal gang led by Rapson in which the mail-van driver is attacked and later dies in hospital. Initially willing to cooperate with the police, she is subsequently intimidated by the gang and will no longer talk about the incident. When Bob Meredith, a reporter who has fallen in love with her, introduces her to the murdered man's widow, Jean agrees to testify against the gang. When Rapson tries escape, he is killed at Tower Bridge.

== Cast ==
- Griffith Jones as Rapson
- Lisa Gastoni as Jean Francis
- Vincent Ball as Bob Meredith
- Eddie Byrne as Art
- Victor Maddern as Ted
- Clifford Evans as Inspector Ford
- Joan Miller as Victor's wife
- Leonard Sachs as Victor
- Leslie Dwyer as Toby
- Jenny Laird as Postman's widow
- Angela White as Betty Francis
- Barbara Couper as Mrs. Francis
- Andre Van Gyseghem as bank manager
- Marie Burke as auntie

== Critical reception ==
The Monthly Film Bulletin wrote: "This small-budget thriller is distinctly above the average of its type. The acting is in general of a high standard; there is a very good behind-the-scenes joke about British Banking and a skilfully-handled sentimental scene. The script is simple but brisk; the direction efficient."

Picturegoer wrote: "It's conventional rough stuff. Lisa Gastoni is particularly good and her sensitive acting points the dutiful moral.

Picture Show wrote: "Vigorous tense thriller ... Excellently acted and directed."

Allmovie wrote, "this British crime quickie reads rather better than it plays."

TV Guide wrote that the film is "hampered by some less-than-impressive camerawork."

Sky Movies noted "a crisp thriller, economic in length but correspondingly fast in pace and actionful."
