= Together and Apart =

1936 novel

- 1937 American first edition
- Author: Margaret Kennedy
- Language: English
- Genre: Drama
- Publisher: Cassell; Random House (US)
- Publication date: 1936
- Publication place: United Kingdom
- Media type: Print

Together and Apart is a 1936 novel by the British writer Margaret Kennedy, her seventh novel. Kennedy was motivated to write it by an increasing number of divorces amongst her acquaintances.

== Synopsis ==
In 1920s Britain, Betsy Canning has an outwardly comfortable existence a middle-aged housewife with three children, yet she lacks satisfaction in her life and comes to the conclusion it is due to the breakdown of her marriage to her husband Alec. Consequently she announces that she wants a divorce and hopes that they can do it in a civilised fashion. However the interference of various people, particularly her mother-in-law, ironically ends any hope of this or of reconciliation. She marries her uninspiring cousin while he, after an affair with their au pair, sets up house with her. Some years later the couple pass each other on the escalator at London Underground station and exchange glances.

== Bibliography ==
- Humble, Nicola. The Feminine Middlebrow Novel, 1920s to 1950s: Class, Domesticity, and Bohemianism. Oxford University Press, 2004.
- Stringer, Jenny & Sutherland, John. The Oxford Companion to Twentieth-century Literature in English. Oxford University Press, 1996.
- Vinson, James. Twentieth-Century Romance and Gothic Writers. Macmillan, 1982.
