= Lorna Doone (1934 film) =

- Directed by: Basil Dean
- Written by: R.D. Blackmore (novel); Dorothy Farnum; Miles Malleson; Gordon Wellesley
- Produced by: Basil Dean
- Starring: Victoria Hopper; John Loder; Margaret Lockwood; Roy Emerton
- Cinematography: Robert Martin
- Edited by: Jack Kitchin
- Music by: Ernest Irving; Armstrong Gibbs
- Production company: Associated Talking Pictures
- Distributed by: ABFD
- Release date: 19 December 1934
- Running time: 90 minutes
- Country: United Kingdom
- Language: English

Lorna Doone is a 1934 British historical drama film directed by Basil Dean and starring Victoria Hopper, John Loder and Margaret Lockwood. It is based on the 1869 novel Lorna Doone by R. D. Blackmore. This was the third screen version of the novel, and the first with sound; a further cinema adaptation followed in 1951.

It was shot partly on location in Somerset. The film's sets were designed by the art director Edward Carrick.

== Cast ==
- Victoria Hopper as Lorna Doone
- John Loder as John Ridd
- Margaret Lockwood as Annie Ridd
- Roy Emerton as Carver Doone
- Mary Clare as Mistress Sara Ridd
- Edward Rigby as Reuben 'Uncle Ben' Huckaback
- Roger Livesey as Tom Faggus
- George Curzon as King James II
- D. A. Clarke-Smith as Counsellor Doone
- Laurence Hanray as Parson Bowden
- Amy Veness as Betty Muxworthy
- Eliot Makeham as John Fry
- Wyndham Goldie as Chief Judge Jeffries
- Frank Cellier as Captain Jeremy Stickles
- Herbert Lomas as Sir Ensor Doone
- Arthur Hambling as Soldier

== Critical reception ==
A contributor to The New York Times commented that it is "has scored no more of a success on its London showing than did The Dictator. Cynics say that the choice of subject and scenario is not all the battle, and that until British producers realize that in the making of pictures the chief essential is not to be dull, Elstree will trail a long, long way behind Hollywood in the best selling markets of the word". The Radio Times noted "Margaret Lockwood, in her screen debut, is a ravishing beauty. The story still holds water, even if the acting and the techniques of 1934 may leak a bit".

== Bibliography ==
- Newland, Paul. British Rural Landscapes on Film. Oxford University Press, 2016.
