= The Constant Nymph (1933 film) =

1933 British film by Basil Dean

- Directed by: Basil Dean
- Screenplay by: Dorothy Farnum
- Based on: The Constant Nymph 1924 novel by Margaret Kennedy; The Constant Nymph 1926 play by Basil Dean Margaret Kennedy
- Produced by: Michael Balcon
- Starring: Victoria Hopper; Brian Aherne; Leonora Corbett
- Cinematography: Mutz Greenbaum
- Edited by: Frederick Y. Smith
- Music by: Eugene Goossens; John Greenwood
- Production company: Gaumont British Picture Corporation
- Distributed by: Gaumont British Distributors; Fox Film
- Release dates: December 1933 (United Kingdom); 7 April 1934 (United States)
- Running time: 97 minutes
- Country: United Kingdom
- Language: English

The Constant Nymph is a 1933 British drama film directed by Basil Dean and starring Victoria Hopper, Brian Aherne and Leonora Corbett. It is an adaptation of the 1924 novel The Constant Nymph by Margaret Kennedy and the 1926 stage play adaptation written by Kennedy and Dean. Dean tried to persuade Ivor Novello to reprise his appearance from the 1928 silent version The Constant Nymph but was turned down and cast Aherne in the part instead. The film is set in Tyrol, western Austria. Previously filmed in 1928, the sentimental Margaret Kennedy novel The Constant Nymph was sumptuously remade by Gaumont-British Picture Corporation in 1933.

== Plot ==
A rich, Belgian gamine named Tessa Sanger falls hopelessly in love with world-famous composer Lewis Dodd, who is so full of himself that he barely acknowledges Tessa's existence. As she looks on in quiet desperation, Dodd marries another woman, her cousin Florence. It takes him nearly the entire picture to realize what a fool he's been, and that Tessa was the one girl for him all along – but alas, it's too late.

== Cast ==
- Victoria Hopper as Tess Sanger
- Brian Aherne as Lewis Dodd
- Leonora Corbett as Florence
- Lyn Harding as Albert Sanger
- Mary Clare as Linda Sanger
- Jane Baxter as Antonia Sanger
- Fritz Schulz as Jacob Birnbaum
- Tony De Lungo as Roberto
- Jane Cornell as Kate Sanger
- Peggy Blythe as Lena Sanger
- Athole Stewart as Charles Churchill
- Beryl Laverick as Susan Sanger
- Jim Gérald as Trigorin

== Remake ==
The Constant Nymph was remade by Warner Bros. in 1943, at which time all prints of the 1933 version were supposed to be destroyed, however, several prints did survive.

== Bibliography ==
- Sweet, Matthew. Shepperton Babylon: The Lost Worlds of British Cinema. Faber and Faber, 2005.
