= Escape from Broadmoor =

- Directed by: John Gilling
- Screenplay by: John Gilling
- Produced by: Harry Reynolds
- Starring: John Stuart; Victoria Hopper; John Le Mesurier
- Cinematography: Cyril Bristow
- Edited by: Maurice Rootes
- Distributed by: Grand National Pictures (British)
- Release date: December 1948
- Running time: 38 minutes
- Country: United Kingdom
- Language: English

Escape from Broadmoor is a 1948 British second feature ('B') short film directed and written by John Gilling and starring Victoria Hopper, John Stuart and John Le Mesurier, in one of his earliest screen appearances. A man escapes from an asylum and is hunted down by police.

The title is a reference to Broadmoor high-security psychiatric hospital in Crowthorne, Berkshire. It was the last film appearance of Victoria Hopper who had been a prominent leading lady in the 1930s.

== Plot ==
An insane killer escapes from Broadmoor Hospital, and returns to the scene of a ten-year-old crime, where the ghost of a servant girl he killed is bent on revenge.

== Cast ==
- Victoria Hopper as Susan
- John Stuart as Inspector Thornton
- John Le Mesurier as Langford/Pendicost
- Frank Hawkins as Roger Trent
- Antony Doonan as Jenkins
- T. Gilly Fenwick as Standing
- Blanche Fothergil as Mrs Midge
- William Douglas
- A. Sawford-Dye
- Elizabeth Howarth
- Pat Ryan

== Reception ==
The Monthly Film Bulletin wrote: "This is a hackneyed story ... The film is a tedious and deplorably unimaginative production."

Chibnall and Macfarlaine, writing in The British 'B' Film, describe the film as "a fanciful melodrama ... interesting in the way it confronts the themes of loss, guilt, atonement, revenge and the survival of the spirit, that were preoccupations in a variety of post-war genres."
