= The Feast (novel) =

1950 novel

- First US edition
- Author: Margaret Kennedy
- Language: English
- Genre: Drama
- Publisher: Cassell (UK); Rinehart (US)
- Publication date: 1949
- Publication place: United Kingdom
- Media type: Print

The Feast is a 1950 novel by the British writer Margaret Kennedy. It is a modern reworking of the seven deadly sins. Her ninth novel, it was her first in more than a decade. It was a Literary Guild choice in America. An excerpt titled "Never Look Back" appeared in Ladies' Home Journal in 1949.

== Synopsis ==
In a Cornish coastal resort town a landslide of a nearby cliff buries a hotel, killing those inside but sparing those who have gone out on a picnic excursion.

== Bibliography ==
- Hammill, Faye. Women, Celebrity, and Literary Culture Between the Wars. University of Texas Press, 2007.
- Humble, Nicola. The Feminine Middlebrow Novel, 1920s to 1950s: Class, Domesticity, and Bohemianism. Oxford University Press, 2004.
- Vinson, James. Twentieth-Century Romance and Gothic Writers. Macmillan, 1982.
- Stringer, Jenny & Sutherland, John. The Oxford Companion to Twentieth-century Literature in English. Oxford University Press, 1996.
