= Victoria Hopper =

British stage and film actress and singer (1909–2007)

- Publicity still
- Born: 24 May 1909; Vancouver, British Columbia, Canada
- Died: 22 January 2007 (aged 97); Romney Marsh, Kent, England, UK
- Occupation: Actress
- Known for: Lorna Doone

Victoria Hopper (24 May 1909 – 22 January 2007) was a Canadian-born British stage and film actress and singer.

== Biography ==
Victoria Evelyn Hopper was born in Vancouver, British Columbia, Canada and brought up in North East England. She studied acting and singing at the Webber-Douglas School of Singing, and was talent spotted in a school production and cast in the title role in a West End play, Martine in 1933. She was at the peak of her popularity during the 1930s. She was married from August 1934 until 1939 to Basil Dean, a British stage and film writer, director and producer. Dean reportedly grew interested in Hooper due to her resemblance to his former lover, actress Meggie Albanesi (died 1923).

Dean promoted Hopper's career and cast her as the leading lady in several major films for Associated Talking Pictures in the mid-1930s. However, the films did badly at the box office and her career waned. Two films she was scheduled to appear in, Grace Darling and Come Live with Me, never materialised.

== Filmography ==
- The Constant Nymph (1933) as Tess Sanger
- Lorna Doone (1934) as Lorna Doone
- Whom the Gods Love (1936) as Constanze Mozart
- Lonely Road (released in the US as Scotland Yard Commands) (1936) as Molly Gordon
- Laburnum Grove (1936) as Elsie Radfern
- The Mill on the Floss (1937) as Lucy Deane
- The Constant Nymph (1938, TV film) as Tessa Sanger
- Nine Till Six (1938, TV film)
- Cornelius (1938, TV film)
- London Wall (1938, TV film) as Pat Milligan
- Magic (1939, TV film) as Patricia Carleon
- The Rose Without a Thorn (1947, TV film)
- Escape from Broadmoor (1948)

== Theatre roles ==
- Three Sisters (1934) as Mary (Theatre Royal Drury Lane, London) (from 30 April)
- Cornelius (1935) as Judy Evison (Duchess Theatre, Aldwych, London) (from 8 April)
- The Melody That Got Lost (1936) as Edith (Embassy Theatre, Swiss Cottage, London) (26 December)
- Autumn (1937) as Monica Brooke (St. Martin's Theatre, London)
- Autumn (1938) as Monica Brooke (Touring production, Leeds - 19 May for one week)
- Drawing Room (1938) as Sylvia (Touring production) (Theatre Royal, Brighton, 19 June for one week)
- Johnson Over Jordan (1939) as Freda Johnson (Saville Theatre, London)
- The Dominant Sex (1941) as Angela Shale (Touring production?) (Theatre Royal, Hanley, from 2 March)
- The Shop on Sly Corner (1945) as Margaret Heiss (St. Martin's Theatre, London)
- Vanity Fair (1946) as Amelia Sedley (Comedy Theatre, London) (29 October 1946 - 21 December 1946)
- Once Upon a Crime (1948) (Theatre Royal Birmingham) (Commenced Monday, 21 June)
- Serious Charge (1955) as Hester Byfield (Garrick Theatre, London) (From 17 February)

== Bibliography ==
- Sweet, Matthew. Shepperton Babylon: The Lost Worlds of British Cinema, Faber and Faber (16 February 2006); ISBN 0571212980/ISBN 978-0571212989

== Sources ==
- Obituary: Victoria Hopper, independent.co.uk; 3 February 2007.
