= The Constant Nymph (1928 film) =

1928 British film by Adrian Brunel

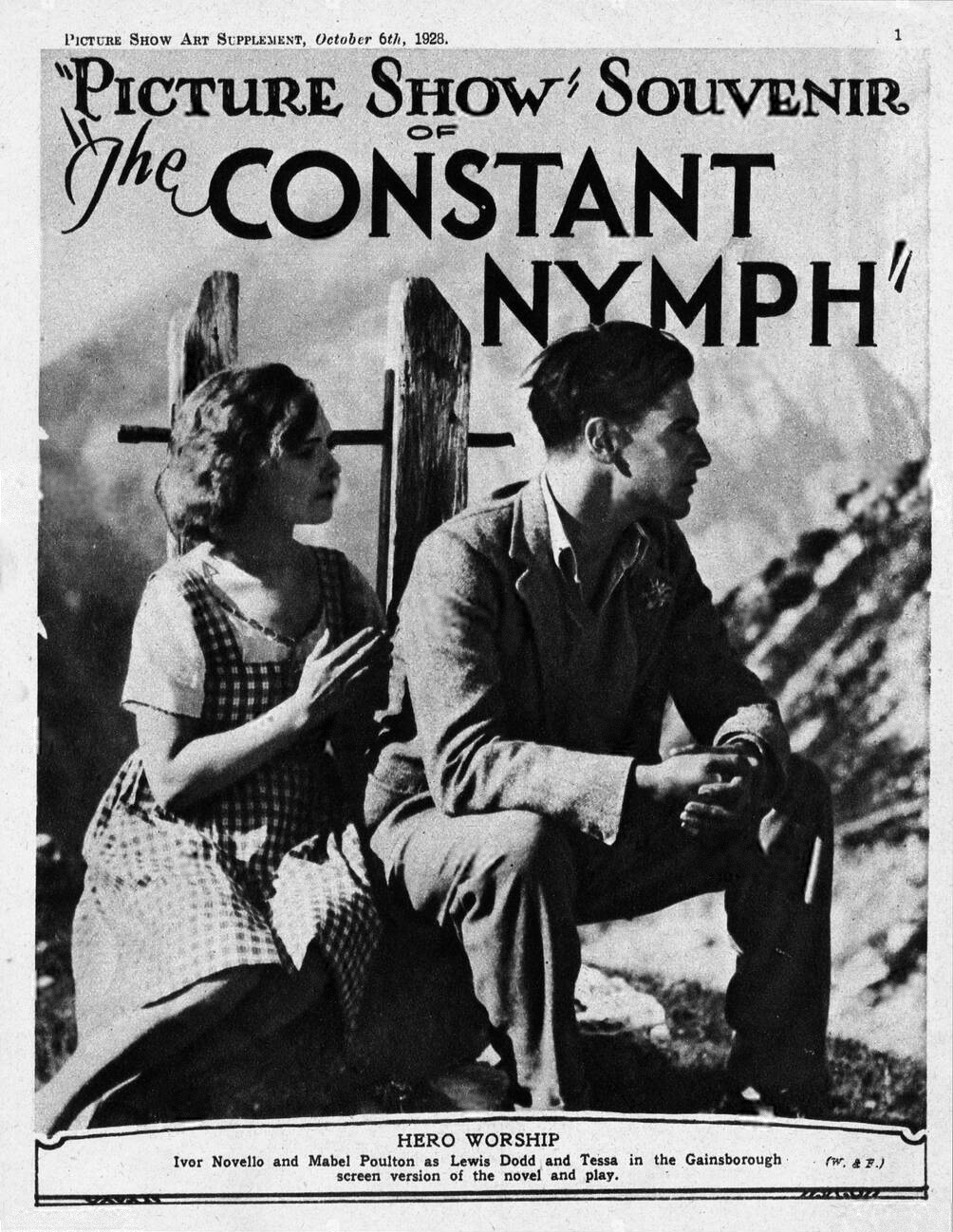
- Directed by: Adrian Brunel
- Written by: Dorothy Farnum; Alma Reville
- Based on: The Constant Nymph 1924 novel by Margaret Kennedy; The Constant Nymph 1926 play by Basil Dean Margaret Kennedy
- Produced by: Michael Balcon; Basil Dean
- Starring: Ivor Novello; Mabel Poulton; Mary Clare; Benita Hume
- Cinematography: David W. Gobbett; James Wilson
- Production company: Gainsborough Pictures
- Distributed by: Woolf & Freedman Film Service
- Release date: September 1928
- Running time: 110 minutes (10,600 feet)
- Country: United Kingdom
- Budget: £30,000

The Constant Nymph is a 1928 British silent drama film directed by Adrian Brunel and starring Ivor Novello and Mabel Poulton. It was the first film adaptation of the 1924 best-selling and controversial novel The Constant Nymph by Margaret Kennedy and the 1926 stage play version by Kennedy and Basil Dean.

== Plot ==
Young composer Lewis Dodd travels to Austria to visit his mentor Albert Sanger. He meets Sanger's teenage daughters Tessa, Antonia, and Pauline and Sanger's third wife Linda who does not appear to be liked by Sanger's daughters. The atmosphere is jovial and celebratory, until Sanger dies very suddenly.

Lewis contacts the girls' uncle in Cambridge, who comes to Austria accompanied by his daughter Florence. After a whirlwind courtship Lewis proposes to Florence, who eagerly accepts his offer of marriage. Tessa is distraught at the news. It is decided that Tessa and Pauline will be sent to a boarding school in England. Meanwhile, Lewis and Florence attempt to settle down in London, but find that in the home setting things are very different and Lewis comes to feel trapped by the superficiality of London society and the realisation of his wife's ambitious, pushy nature.

Tessa and Pauline are unhappy at school and decide to run away, arriving at the home of Lewis and Florence on the evening on which Florence has arranged a musical recital designed to showcase Lewis' talents to her influential friends. Florence is extremely annoyed by the interruption to her evening and allows the girls to stay, but with ill-disguised bad grace. Lewis is angry at his wife's attitude, and ends up taking her to task in front of the gathering, leaving her humiliated.

The atmosphere in the household deteriorates as the attraction between Lewis and Tessa becomes increasingly obvious. Lewis begins to treat Florence with increasing disdain and lack of respect. As the date of Lewis' first public performance draws near, he decides to leave Florence after the concert, and Tessa agrees to leave with him. Florence is suspicious that something is afoot, challenges Tessa and the two end up in a serious argument, after which Florence forbids Tessa from attending the concert.

Left locked in alone at home on the evening of the concert, Tessa manages to escape through a window and makes her way to the theatre. Lewis' performance is a big success, but afterwards he ignores the congratulatory gathering Florence has assembled in his dressing room, and instead heads off with Tessa to catch the boat train for Belgium. Tessa begins to feel ill as she boards the boat and her condition deteriorates as the journey progresses. When they finally arrive at a dreary back-street lodging house in Brussels, it is clear that Tessa is seriously ill and the guilt-stricken Lewis begins to write a letter to Tessa's uncle begging for help and attempting to make it clear that he alone is responsible for the situation and Tessa has done nothing to merit reproach. Before he can finish the letter however, Tessa collapses and dies.

== Cast ==
Publicity photo that shows Ivor Novello and Mabel Poulton.

- Ivor Novello as Lewis Dodd
- Mabel Poulton as Tessa Sanger
- Frances Doble as Florence
- Mary Clare as Linda Sanger
- Dorothy Boyd as Pauline Sanger
- Benita Hume as Antonia Sanger
- Georg Henrich as Albert Sanger
- Tony de Lungo as Roberto
- Evan Thomas as Ike
- Yvonne Thomas as Kate Sanger
- Clifford Heatherley as Sir Berkeley
- Elsa Lanchester as lady

== Production ==
Location filming took place in the Austrian Tyrol.

The theme of adolescent sexuality reportedly discomfited the British film censors, until they were reassured that lead actress Poulton was in fact in her 20s.

== Reception ==
The film proved a commercial and critical success, being named the best British feature film of 1928.

Jo Botting of the BFI notes: "The progression through the film is from light to darkness, from space to enclosure and from hope to despair."

== Preservation status ==
The British Film Institute had classed The Constant Nymph as a lost film, but it was found as a result of a 1992 BFI campaign to locate missing films.
