= The Constant Nymph (1943 film) =

1943 romantic drama film by Edmund Goulding

- Theatrical poster
- Directed by: Edmund Goulding
- Screenplay by: Kathryn Scola
- Based on: The Constant Nymph 1924 novel by Margaret Kennedy; The Constant Nymph 1926 play by Basil Dean Margaret Kennedy
- Produced by: Henry Blanke; Hal B. Wallis
- Starring: Joan Fontaine; Charles Boyer; Alexis Smith
- Cinematography: Tony Gaudio
- Edited by: David Weisbart
- Music by: Erich Wolfgang Korngold
- Distributed by: Warner Bros. Pictures
- Release date: June 23, 1943
- Running time: 112 minutes
- Country: United States
- Language: English
- Budget: $1.9 million (US rentals) or $1,123,000
- Box office: $3,452,000

The Constant Nymph is a 1943 American romantic drama film starring Charles Boyer, Joan Fontaine, Alexis Smith, Brenda Marshall, Charles Coburn, May Whitty, and Peter Lorre with a famous score by Erich Wolfgang Korngold. It was adapted by Kathryn Scola from the 1924 novel of the same name by Margaret Kennedy and the 1926 play by Kennedy and Basil Dean and directed by Edmund Goulding.

== Plot ==
Belgian composer Lewis Dodd's latest symphony has flopped. Seeking new inspiration, he travels to a Swiss chalet to visit his mentor, Albert Sanger, and his family. Sanger's four young daughters – Kate, Toni, Tessa and Paula – have a crush on Dodd. Tessa, particularly, believes that someday, when she is old enough, he will recognize the depth of her affection for him. Lewis brings out his newest work, a symphonic poem called Tomorrow, which he has composed for the Sanger girls to play. Albert himself is far more pleased with this "trifle" than with Lewis's noisy modernist symphony. However, shortly afterwards, the elderly, hard-drinking Sanger dies while orchestrating Lewis's "little tune", a task which Dodd now vows to complete himself.

While remaining with the Sangers to help the family cope with their loss, Lewis renews an acquaintance with the beautiful, sophisticated Florence Creighton. Later, Lewis asks her to marry him. Tessa collapses at the news. Only her closest sister, Paula, understands why. Six months later, Florence and Lewis are in London, living in her father's large townhouse. They are taking care of Tessa and Paula, who now attend a boarding school. Both girls find the experience unbearable. After they run away, a worried Lewis notifies Scotland Yard. But the elusive Tessa and Paula arrive at the townhouse, just in time to witness Lewis's private performance of Tomorrow. Much to everyone's disappointment, Lewis has taken the beautiful melody and buried it under a modernist "bangety bang" racket. As a result, even Lewis himself is convinced that more changes are needed before the scheduled concert of the piece is to take place. He thus asks Tessa to stay and help him remember the more Romanticist conception of Tomorrow as originally envisioned by Sanger.

A few weeks later, it is the day of the concert. While dressing for the occasion, Tessa, who has a history of cardiac problems, suffers a fainting spell. Florence, who has become jealous of Tessa's close collaborative relationship with Lewis, convinces her she cannot attend. She might have palpitations and cause a scene. So Tessa remains in the townhouse's study, where she listens to a radio broadcast of the new version of Tomorrow as it is performed before an audience. Before the composition's end, however, she collapses to the floor and dies. At the concert hall, the presentation is met with a long ovation. Lewis rushes home to tell Tessa of their success but instead witnesses the sight of Tessa's body lying on the couch in the study. Lewis calls her name and embraces her, his face wet with tears. The film's score climaxes as a log in the fireplace seems to spark, then flame, and then dissolve into a brilliant sky.

== Cast ==
- Charles Boyer as Lewis Dodd
- Joan Fontaine as Tessa Sanger
- Alexis Smith as Florence Creighton
- Brenda Marshall as Toni Sanger
- Charles Coburn as Charles Creighton
- May Whitty as Lady Longborough
- Peter Lorre as Fritz Bercovy
- Joyce Reynolds as Paula Sanger
- Jean Muir as Kate Sanger
- Montagu Love as Albert Sanger
- Eduardo Ciannelli as Roberto
- Janine Crispin as Marie
- Doris Lloyd as Miss Hamilton
- Joan Blair as Lina
- André Charlot as Dr. Renee
- David Clyde as florist
- George Kirby as moving man
- Brandon Hurst as minor role (uncredited)

== Music ==
Erich Wolfgang Korngold composed the music for The Constant Nymph. The symphonic poem Tomorrow, which was given a complete performance in the film, became Opus 33 in the roster of his works. It first was performed in concert in 1944.

== Reception ==
=== Box-office ===
According to Warner Bros. records, the film earned $1,833,000 in the U.S. and $1,619,000 in other markets.

== Accolades ==
Fontaine was nominated for the Academy Award for Best Actress.

== Availability ==
The will of Margaret Kennedy stated that the film could be shown only at universities and museums after its original theatrical run ended. As a result, the film was unavailable for exhibition for nearly 70 years. The film received its first authorized public screening in decades as part of the 2011 Turner Classic Movies Classic Film Festival.

Edmund Goulding's biographer Matthew Kennedy wrote that Joan Fontaine spoke "rapturously" of The Constant Nymph: "She was nominated for a best actress Oscar for it, and it remains a personal favorite of hers."

The film was released on DVD under the Warner Archive Collection label on 22 November 2011.

== Radio adaptation ==
The Constant Nymph was presented on Hollywood Players December 17, 1946. Fontaine reprised her role from the film.

== See also ==
- The Constant Nymph (novel)
