= Troy Chimneys =

1953 novel

- First edition (UK)
- Author: Margaret Kennedy
- Language: English
- Genre: Historical
- Publisher: Macmillan; Rinehart (US)
- Publication date: 1953
- Publication place: United Kingdom
- Media type: Print

Troy Chimneys is a 1953 historical novel by the British writer Margaret Kennedy. It was awarded the James Tait Black Memorial Prize for Fiction.

== Synopsis ==
While recovering from illness, a Victorian gentleman decides to read the diaries of his Regency Era ancestor Miles Lufton.

== Bibliography ==
- Hammill, Faye. Women, Celebrity, and Literary Culture Between the Wars. University of Texas Press, 2007.
- Vinson, James. Twentieth-Century Romance and Gothic Writers. Macmillan, 1982.
- Wallace, Diana. The Woman's Historical Novel: British Women Writers, 1900-2000. Springer, 2004.
