= Dorothy Farnum =

American screenwriter (1900–1970)

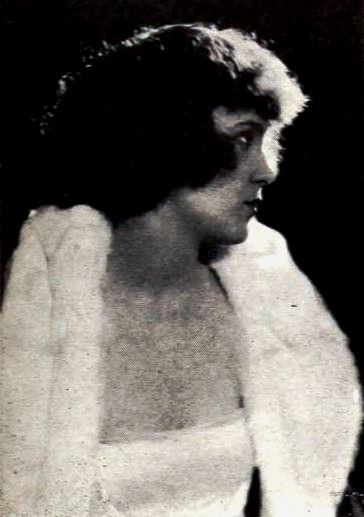
- From a 1921 magazine
- Born: 10 June 1900; New York City, U.S.
- Died: 27 January 1970 (aged 69); North Andover, Massachusetts, U.S.
- Occupations: Actress, screenwriter
- Years active: 1913–1934
- Spouse: Earnest Andersson (m. 1917; div. 1921)
- Parent(s): William Farnum; Mabel Eaton

Dorothy Farnum (10 June 1900 – 27 January 1970) was an American actress and screenwriter. She was noted for her work at Metro-Goldwyn-Mayer during the silent era and later in Britain during the 1930s.

== Career ==
Farnum was the daughter of actor William Farnum and Mabel Eaton and niece of Dustin Farnum. She was educated in a convent boarding school. She mastered French history and literature, and became fluent in Spanish and German.

She acted in two movies released in 1915, The Cub and Over Night, but she became famous for writing plays and novels and then turning them into screenplays. Her most popular screenplays were The Temptress (1926), Sinner or Saint (1923), and Bardelys the Magnificent (1926). Beau Brummel (1924) was very successful too. Most of her films were romantic dramas.

When asked about her writing process, she remarked to the Los Angeles Times in 1926: "You must think with your heart and feel with your head. When I write my scenes I try hard to progress not from one thought to another, but from one feeling to another. For the majority of people want to have their hearts excited and their minds let alone when they come into the world of low lights and soft music of a motion-picture theater."

She was a member of the Warner Bros. scenario department during this time, and a large portion of her work focused solely on scenario adaptions. Dorothy worked with many famous, leading stars and was one of the top writers at Metro-Goldwyn-Mayer. She moved to Paris and then London, working for Gaumont British. She also worked at United Artists. It was reported by The Washington Post in 1927 that at her peak of her profession, her salary was $2,500 a week.

She married Maurice Barber, the general manager of the Cinema Finance Company, in 1923. Farnum died on January 27, 1970, in North Andover, Massachusetts.

== Partial filmography as writer ==
- The Cub (1915)
- The Broken Melody (1919)
- Good References (1920)
- Jim the Penman (1921)
- Salvation Nell (1921)
- The Iron Trail (1921)
- The Secrets of Paris (1922)
- The Darling of the Rich (1922)
- His Wife's Husband (1922)
- Modern Marriage (1923)
- Loyal Lives (1923)
- Jacqueline (1923)
- Sinner or Saint (1923)
- Daring Youth (1924)
- Beau Brummel (1924)
- Tess of the D'Urbervilles (1924)
- Lover's Lane (1924)
- Being Respectable (1924)
- Babbitt (1924)
- Rose of the World (1925)
- Recompense (1925)
- Off the Highway (1925)
- Torrent (1926)
- The Temptress (1926)
- Bardelys the Magnificent (1926)
- Dream of Love (1928)
- The Unholy Night (1929)
- Call of the Flesh (1930)
- A Free Soul (1931)
- Lilac (1932)
- Jenny Lind (1932)
- The Constant Nymph (1933)
- Autumn Crocus (1934)
- Jew Süss (1934)
- Evensong (1934)
- Lorna Doone (1934)
- Forbidden Territory (1934)

== Bibliography ==
- Harper, Sue. Women in British Cinema: Mad, Bad and Dangerous to Know. Continuum International Publishing Group, 2000.
