= The Fool of the Family =

1930 novel

- First edition
- Author: Margaret Kennedy
- Language: English
- Genre: Drama
- Publisher: Heinemann
- Publication date: 1930
- Publication place: United Kingdom
- Media type: Print
- ISBN: 0434388025
- Preceded by: The Constant Nymph

The Fool of the Family is a 1930 novel by the British writer Margaret Kennedy. It is the sequel to her 1924 bestseller The Constant Nymph.

In 1934, Kennedy adapted the novel into a play Escape Me Never which in turn had two film adaptations, Escape Me Never (1935) and Escape Me Never (1947).

== Bibliography ==
- Vinson, James (1982). "Twentieth-Century Romance and Gothic Writers". Macmillan. pp. 1–733. doi:10.1007/978-1-349-06127-3_1. ISBN 978-1-349-06129-7.
- Stringer, Jenny & Sutherland, John. The Oxford Companion to Twentieth-century Literature in English. Oxford University Press, 1996. ISBN 9780192122711.
