= Margaret Kennedy =

English novelist and playwright (1896–1967)

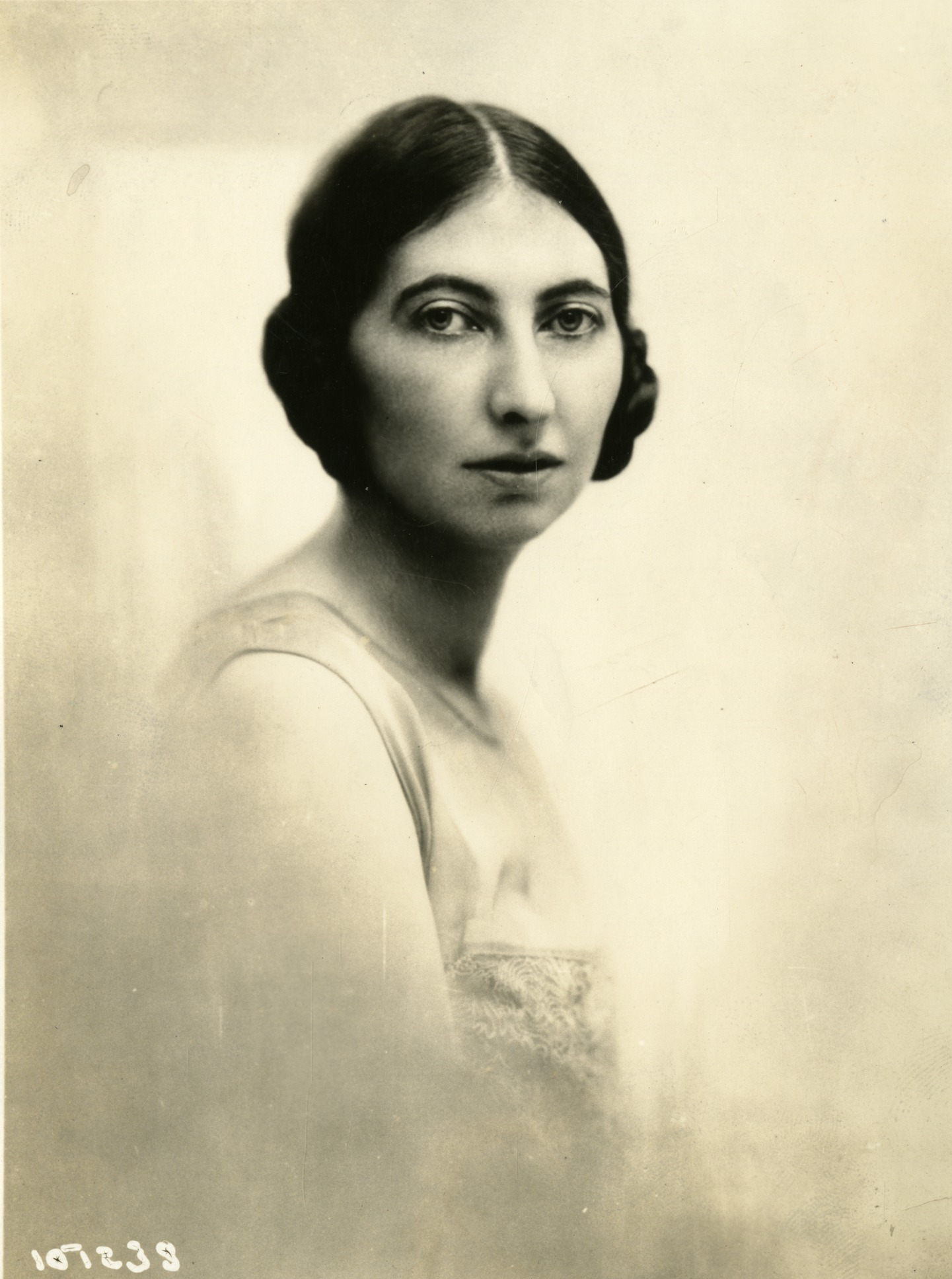
- Born: 23 April 1896; London, England
- Died: 31 July 1967 (aged 71); Adderbury, England
- Education: Somerville College, Oxford
- Occupations: Novelist; playwright
- Spouse: David Davies (m. 1925; died 1964)
- Children: 3
- Relatives: Joyce Cary (cousin); Serena Mackesy (granddaughter)
- Writing career
- Notable work: The Constant Nymph

Margaret Davies, Lady Davies (née Kennedy ; 23 April 1896 – 31 July 1967) was an English novelist and playwright. Her most successful work, as a novel and as a play, was The Constant Nymph. She was a productive writer and several of her works were filmed. Three of her novels were reprinted in 2011.

== Personal life ==
Margaret Kennedy was born in Hyde Park Gate, London, the eldest of the four children of Charles Moore Kennedy, a barrister, and his wife Ellinor Edith Marwood. The novelist Joyce Cary was a cousin on her father's side.

She attended Cheltenham Ladies' College, where she began writing, and then went up to Somerville College, Oxford, in 1915 to read History. Other literary contemporaries at Somerville College included Winifred Holtby, Vera Brittain, Hilda Reid, Naomi Mitchison and Sylvia Thompson. She also became close friends with the Welsh author Flora Forster. Her first publication was a history book, A Century of Revolution (1922).

Kennedy was married on 20 June 1925 to the barrister David Davies (1889–1964), who later became a county court judge and a national insurance commissioner. He was knighted in 1952, making her full married name Margaret Davies, Lady Davies. They had a son and two daughters, one of whom was the novelist Julia Birley, born 13 May 1928 and author of at least 13 novels published between 1968 and 1985. The novelist Serena Mackesy is her granddaughter.

Kennedy died at Flora Forster's house at Adderbury, Oxfordshire on 31 July 1967.

== Novels and plays ==
Kennedy is best appreciated today for her second novel, The Constant Nymph, which she adapted into a highly successful West End play that opened at the New Theatre, with Noël Coward and Edna Best in September 1926. Coward was replaced by John Gielgud during the run. It was also successfully filmed in 1928 by Adrian Brunel and Alma Reville, directed by Brunel and Basil Dean, and starring Ivor Novello, Mabel Poulton and Benita Hume, and again in 1933, 1938 (for television), and 1943.

Kennedy's first novel was The Ladies of Lyndon (1923). Among later successes were The Fool of the Family (1930), a sequel to The Constant Nymph, and the psychological novel A Long Time Ago (1932). The Midas Touch (1938) was a Daily Mail book of the month, The Feast (1949) a Literary Guild choice in the United States, and Troy Chimneys (1953) winner of the James Tait Black Memorial Prize. The Heroes of Clone (1957) drew on her experience as a screenplay writer. She also published a biography of Jane Austen and a study of the art of fiction, Outlaws on Parnassus.

Kennedy followed the stage success of The Constant Nymph (adapted in conjunction with Basil Dean) with three more co-written plays. The most successful was Escape Me Never (1934), adapting The Fool of the Family, which was also filmed twice.

Of her post-war novels, The Feast (1950) introduces the disaster (a seaside hotel annihilated by the collapse of a cliff) first and the characters who may or may not have perished in it afterwards, as in Thornton Wilder's The Bridge of San Luis Rey. Her final novel, Not in the Calendar: The Story of a Friendship, involves a friendship between a daughter of a wealthy family and the deaf daughter of one of their servants.

Kennedy's family donated her papers and correspondence to Somerville College Library.

== Partial bibliography ==
- A Century of Revolution 1789–1920 ([London]: Methuen, 1922), history
- The Ladies of Lyndon (London: Heinemann, 1923), novel
- The Constant Nymph (London: Heinemann, 1924; Leipzig), novel
- With Basil Dean: The Constant Nymph - from the novel (London: Heinemann, 1926), play
- A Long Week-End (London: Heinemann, 1927), limited e. of short magazine story.
- Red Sky at Morning (London: Heinemann, 1927), novel
- With Basil Dean: Come with Me (London: Heinemann, 1928), play
- Dewdrops (London: Heinemann, 1928), limited ed. of short girls' school story.
- The Game and the Candle (London: Heinemann, 1928), limited ed. of short magazine story.
- The Fool of the Family (London: Heinemann, 1930), novel, sequel to The Constant Nymph
- Return I Dare Not (London: Heinemann, 1931), novel
- A Long Time Ago (London: Heinemann, 1932), novel
- Escape Me Never (London: Heinemann, 1934), dramatization of The Fool of the Family
- Together and Apart (London: Cassell, 1936), novel
- With Gregory Ratoff: Autumn (1937), play
- The Midas Touch (London: Cassell, 1938), novel
- Where Stands A Wingèd Sentry (New Haven: Yale University Press, 1941), memoir
- The Mechanized Muse. P. E. N. series (London: G. Allen & Unwin, 1942), on the cinema
- Happy with Either (1948), play
- The Feast (London: Cassell, 1950), novel
- Jane Austen. Novelists Series No. 1 (London: Barker, 1950), biography/criticism
- Lucy Carmichael (London: Macmillan, 1951), novel
- Troy Chimneys (London: Macmillan, 1953), novel
- The Oracles (London: Macmillan, 1955), novel
- The Heroes of Clone (London: Macmillan, 1957), novel
- The Outlaws on Parnassus (London: Cresset Press, 1958), criticism
- A Night in Cold Harbour (London: Macmillan, 1960), novel
- The Forgotten Smile (London: Macmillan, 1961), novel
- Not in the Calendar: The Story of a Friendship (London: Macmillan, 1964), novel
- Women at Work (London: Macmillan, 1966), two novellas

== Selected filmography ==
- The Old Curiosity Shop (1934)
- Escape Me Never: (1935) and (1947)
- Whom the Gods Love (1936)
- Dreaming Lips (1937)
- Stolen Life (1939)
- Return to Yesterday (1940)
