= Basil Dean =

English actor and director (1888–1978)

Basil Dean CBE
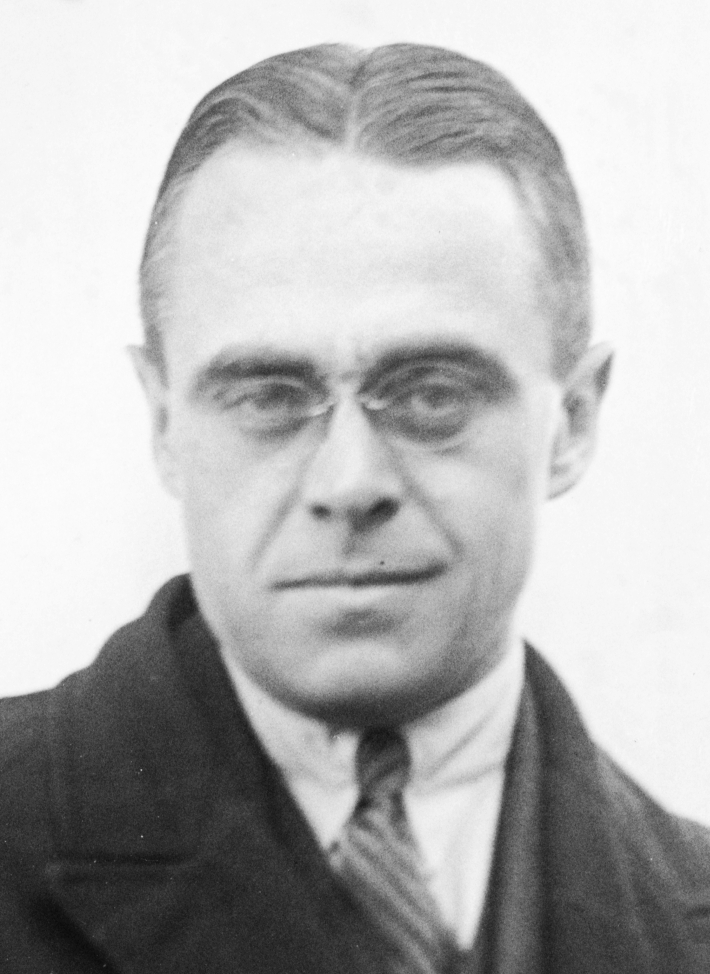
- Born: Basil Herbert Dean; 27 September 1888; Croydon, England
- Died: 22 April 1978 (aged 89); Marylebone, London, England
- Occupations: Actor; writer; theatre producer; stage director; film producer; film director
- Years active: 1906–1961

Basil Herbert Dean CBE (27 September 1888 – 22 April 1978) was an English actor, writer, producer and director in the theatre and in cinema. He founded the Liverpool Repertory Company in 1911 and in the First World War, after organising unofficial entertainments for his comrades in the army, he was appointed to do so officially. After the war he produced and directed mostly in the West End. He staged premieres of plays by writers including J. M. Barrie, Noël Coward, John Galsworthy, Harley Granville-Barker and Somerset Maugham. He produced nearly 40 films, and directed 16, mainly in the 1930s, with stars including Gracie Fields.

Together with Leslie Henson, Dean set up and ran the Entertainments National Service Association, or ENSA, in 1939 to provide a wide range of entertainment for British armed forces personnel during the Second World War. After the war he resumed his West End career successfully but without regaining his pre-war dominance.

== Life and career ==
=== Early years ===
Dean was born on 27 September 1888 in Croydon, Surrey, the younger son and second of the four children of Harding Hewar Dean (1855–1942), a cigarette manufacturer, and his wife, Elizabeth Mary Winton. He was educated at Whitgift Grammar School, Croydon. According to his entry in Who's Who in the Theatre he was originally intended for a career in the diplomatic service, but he trained as an "analytical scientist" before working for two years on the London Stock Exchange.

After appearing in amateur theatricals, Dean made his first professional appearance on the stage at the Opera House, Cheltenham in September 1906, as Trip in The School for Scandal. He toured in Shakespeare and other plays and then he joined Annie Horniman's new repertory company in Manchester in 1907, remaining with it for four years in a wide range of plays from the 16th to the 20th centuries. During this period he made his first London appearance when the Horniman company gave a two-week repertory season at the Coronet Theatre in June 1909.

In 1911 Dean directed an experimental theatre season in Liverpool. That year he became the first director of the Liverpool Repertory Theatre (later the Playhouse), where he put on plays by John Galsworthy, Harold Brighouse, and Harley Granville-Barker. At the same time he was technical adviser for stage-construction at the Birmingham Repertory Theatre, which opened in 1913. In 1913 Sir Herbert Tree appointed him assistant stage director at His Majesty's Theatre, London. Tree observed, "This young man intends to get on, either by hook or by crook – it is to be hoped by the former".

=== 1914 to 1939 ===
In 1914, Dean married Esther Van Gruisen (1891–1983). The marriage, which lasted until 1925, when it was dissolved, produced three sons, one of them the musicologist Winton Dean; another became a judge. On the outbreak of the First World War in 1914, Dean joined the Cheshire Regiment. While based at Catterick Camp he took part in shows to entertain his comrades, and developed an arrangement under which each battalion in the camp contributed to the building and running of a single "garrison theatre" for the whole camp, on an impressive, near-professional scale.

He was gazetted captain in 1916, and in January 1917 he was transferred to the War Office in London to head the entertainment branch of the Navy and Army Canteen Board (later the Navy, Army and Air Force Institutes ), with control of fifteen theatres and ten touring companies.

After the war Dean launched himself as a producer in London, forming a syndicate, Reandean, with a business partner, Alec Lionel Rea. They leased the St Martin's Theatre, and after a poor start, with two failures, they achieved a strong success with Galsworthy's tragi-comedy The Skin Game. Reandean mounted a series of productions, including plays by Somerset Maugham, J. M. Barrie and Clemence Dane.

Hassan, 1923

Among Dean's successes was a stage version of James Elroy Flecker's narrative poem Hassan, of which Dean was co-adapter for the stage as a spectacular exotic drama, with music by Frederick Delius and choreography by Léonide Massine. Dean had tried to interest Tree in staging the piece, but the costs were prohibitive. The eventual production, in 1923, made its mark, and Dean was called on to stage revivals in later years.

Another conspicuous success was The Constant Nymph (1926) by Margaret Kennedy, but Dean's handling of the casting was an example of the bullying and ruthlessness that made him many enemies in the theatrical profession. Having given the leading role to the young John Gielgud, but then finding that Noël Coward was available, Dean demoted Gielgud to understudy, despite the latter's unassailable contractual right to play the part. Dean's determination to have his own way made him, as The Times put it, "something of a byword in the West End through his dictatorial methods at rehearsal". Biographies of performers from Gielgud, Katharine Cornell and Vivien Leigh to Gracie Fields, Alan Napier and Barry Morse refer to Dean's bullying and cruelty and his unflattering nicknames: "Bloody Basil", "The Basilisk" and "Bastard Basil".

Gielgud's biographer, Jonathan Croall, wrote of Dean:

His glittering productions were slick, meticulous and imaginative, with brilliantly realistic sets, state-of-the-art lighting and efficient teamwork. Tall, massive and bespectacled, "Bastard Basil" was a sadistic bully, and the most hated man in the theatre. In rehearsals he created a regime of fear, reducing actors to tears with his sarcasm and abuse. Yet he often drew excellent performances from his victims, and because his productions were usually successful, actors put up with his tyranny.

In 1924, Dean took on the joint managing directorship with Alfred Butt of the Theatre Royal, Drury Lane with the aim, much mocked at the time, of establishing a national theatre there. The opening production, London Life, by Arnold Bennett and Edward Knoblock, failed. One critic wrote that the play was unworthy of its authors and the production unworthy of Dean. A Midsummer Night's Dream, was successful, but, according to The Times, "did his reputation as a director of poetic drama no good". His colleagues' insistence on importing an American musical provoked his resignation within twelve months.

In 1925, Dean married Lady Mercy Greville (3 April 1904 - 21 November 1968; known by her acting name, Nancie Parsons), daughter of Francis Greville, 5th Earl of Warwick and his wife, the former Daisy Maynard. Dean and Parsons had one daughter, Frances Elizabeth Tessa, before their marriage was dissolved in 1933.

In 1929, after he had directed Coward's The Vortex on Broadway, introducing Coward as an actor to American audiences, and three Coward plays in London – Easy Virtue, The Queen Was in the Parlour and Sirocco, the last of which was a conspicuous failure – Dean and Rea dissolved their partnership.

Dean became chairman and joint managing director of Associated Talking Pictures (later Ealing Studios) in 1929. During the 1930s, his career alternated between cinema and theatre. For a while his films did well, particularly those starring Gracie Fields, but his flair for theatrical staging did not extend to the cinema, where his work as director was uninspired: the biographer Alan Strachan writes, "most of his films are inert with next to no rhythm or comedic flair", and Fields's biographer David Bret writes that Dean was "positively renowned for his complete lack of sense of humour". In the late 1930s, Dean fell out with Ealing Studios, where his colleagues felt that he was neglecting films in favour of his theatrical work; he was obliged to resign.

In 1934 Dean married the Canadian-born Victoria Hopper (1909–2007). They had no children. This, his third and final marriage, was dissolved in 1948.

=== Second World War and ENSA ===
As the Second World War loomed, Dean published his suggestions on how the entertainments industry could help to sustain the morale of the civilian public and members of the armed forces when war came. For this he was derided by some colleagues, such as George Black of the London Palladium, who were convinced there would be no war. Dean ignored his critics and formed an alliance with the comedian and theatre owner Leslie Henson, who had been a leading figure in entertainments for the troops in the First World War.

When the war started, Dean, after lobbying the government, was appointed director of the entertainment branch of the Navy, Army and Air Force Institutes, which was named ENSA (Entertainments National Service Association). (Note: The organisation was originally to have been called the Actors' National Service Association, but Henson pointed out that in that case, he and Dean would be accused of knowing all the ANSAs, and there were in any case musicians and other performers besides actors engaged by ENSA.) Drury Lane was requisitioned as the organisation's headquarters. Dean worked with Henson and other experts in their theatrical or musical spheres, including Black (now firmly behind Dean's ideas), Lena Ashwell, Harold Holt, Jack Hylton, Sir Harry Lauder and Dame Sybil Thorndike, organising entertainment in Britain and overseas for the troops and civilians throughout the war.

Dean's biographer James Roose-Evans writes, "during six and a half years more than 80 per cent of the entertainments industry gave [ENSA] service in innumerable performances of plays, revues, and concerts". The Times recorded, "Over two and a half million performances took place before over 300 million men and women in the forces and industry". (Note: The estimated number of people attending ENSA performances varies widely, from 3 million (Oxford Dictionary of National Biography) to 300 million (The Times).) Richard Llewellyn, Dean's assistant at the time, wrote of him:

Had Dean been a general he would have been properly acknowledged for his work with ENSA. Without Basil Dean, it would never have been. He was a martinet, a son-of-a-bitch bastard, a monolith, a kindly – sometimes – tyrant, a bully, but he knew what he wanted, and others didn't. His was the influence, the hand on the wheel, that never faltered.

=== Later years ===
After the war Dean resumed his own activities in the West End and elsewhere, but never regained the pre-eminence he had enjoyed in the 1930s. Among his post-war productions were J. B. Priestley's An Inspector Calls for the Old Vic company at its temporary home at the New Theatre in October 1946 and The Wizard of Oz for the Christmas season of 1946–47. He organised the first British Repertory Theatre Festival at the St James's Theatre (1948) in which the repertory companies of Liverpool, Sheffield, Birmingham and Bristol were represented. His productions overseas included Hassan for the National Theatre Organisation of South Africa (1950) and for Dublin International Drama Festival (1960) and Graham Greene's The Heart of the Matter, Boston (1950).

For the West End, Dean adapted and directed The Diary of a Nobody, with Henson as Mr Pooter (1954); he staged Michael Redgrave's adaptation of Henry James's The Aspern Papers (1959). His last London production was Out of This World, an adaptation of an Italian comedy, in 1960. For his last production of all he returned to the Liverpool Playhouse in 1961 to direct The Importance of Being Earnest for the golden jubilee of the company he had founded.

In his later years Dean wrote a good deal, including an official history of ENSA and two volumes of autobiography. He died at his flat in Marylebone, London on 22 April 1978, aged 89. A memorial service was held for him at St James's, Piccadilly.

== Cinema work ==
=== Producer ===
- The Constant Nymph (1928, also co-writer)
- The Return of Sherlock Holmes (1929, also co-writer)
- Escape (1930, also co-writer)
- Birds of Prey (1930, also co-writer)
- Sally in Our Alley (1931)
- Nine till Six (1932)
- Love on the Spot (1932)
- Looking on the Bright Side (1932, also co-writer)
- The Impassive Footman (1932)
- The Water Gipsies (1932, also co-writer)
- The Sign of Four (1932)
- A Honeymoon Adventure (1932, also co-writer)
- Three Men in a Boat (1933)
- Skipper of the Osprey (1933)
- Loyalties (1933)
- Autumn Crocus (1934, also co-writer)
- Love, Life and Laughter (1934)
- Java Head (1934)
- Sing As We Go (1934)
- Lorna Doone (1934)
- Look Up and Laugh (1935)
- Midshipman Easy (1935)
- No Limit (1935)
- Lonely Road (1936)
- Laburnum Grove (1936)
- Keep Your Seats, Please (1936)
- Whom the Gods Love (1936)
- Queen of Hearts (1936/I)
- The Show Goes On (1937, also co-writer)
- Keep Fit (1937)
- Feather Your Nest (1937)
- Penny Paradise (1938, also co-writer)
- It's in the Air (1938)
- When We Are Married (1938) (for television)
- 21 Days (1940) (associate producer, also co-writer)
- The Gentle Gunman (1952) (co-producer)

=== Director ===
- The Constant Nymph (1928)
- The Return of Sherlock Holmes (1929)
- Escape (1930)
- Birds of Prey (1930)
- Nine Till Six (1932)
- Looking on the Bright Side (1932)
- The Impassive Footman (1932)
- Loyalties (1933)
- The Constant Nymph (1933, also co-writer)
- Autumn Crocus (1934)
- Sing As We Go (1934)
- Lorna Doone (1934)
- Look Up and Laugh (1935)
- Whom the Gods Love (1936)
- The Show Goes On (1937)
- 21 Days (1940)

== Notes, references and sources ==
=== Sources ===
- Bret, David (1996). Gracie Fields: The Authorised Biography. Bath: Windsor. ISBN 978-0-74-517982-7.
- Collier, Richard (1986). Make-Believe: The Magic of International Theatre. New York: Dodd, Mead. ISBN 978-0-39-608645-1.
- Croall, Jonathan (2011). John Gielgud: Matinee Idol to Movie Star. London: Bloomsbury. ISBN 978-1-40-816671-0.
- Fawkes, Richard (1978). Fighting for a Laugh: Entertaining the British and American Armed Forces, 1939–1946. London: Macdonald and Jane's. ISBN 978-0-354-04201-7.
- Merriman, Andy (2014). Greasepaint and Cordite : How ENSA Entertained the Troops during World War II. London: Aurum. ISBN 978-1-78-131162-2.
- Morse, Barry (2006). Remember with Advantages. Jefferson: McFarland. ISBN 978-0-78-642771-0.
- Napier, Alan (2015). Not Just Batman's Butler. Jefferson: McFarland. ISBN 978-1-47-666287-9.
- Parker, John, ed. (1939). Who's Who in the Theatre (ninth ed.). London: Sir Isaac Pitman and Sons. OCLC 473894893.
- Parker, John; Freda Gaye; Ian Herbert (1978). Who Was Who in the Theatre. Detroit: Gale Research. OCLC 310466458.
- Strachan, Alan (2020). Dark Star: A Biography of Vivien Leigh. London: Bloomsbury. ISBN 978-0-75-560057-1.
