= Escape Me Never (play) =

1934 play

- Written by: Margaret Kennedy
- Date premiered: 1934
- Place premiered: Apollo Theatre, West End, London
- Setting: Europe

Escape Me Never is a 1934 play written by Margaret Kennedy based upon her 1930 novel The Fool of the Family.

Set in pre World War I Europe, it tells the story of two brothers (Caryl and Sebastian Durbok) who are composers, share a flat, and are both in love with two women—an heiress and a young innocent.

The original West End run of the play at the Apollo Theatre starred Elisabeth Bergner for whom the play was written. Bergner, in her Broadway debut, starred also in the play's 1935 production at the Shubert Theatre.

== Adaptations ==
The play was adapted into a British film in 1935 starring Bergner and directed by Paul Czinner, and into an American film in 1947 starring Ida Lupino, directed by Peter Godfrey.
