= The Constant Nymph (novel) =

1924 novel by Margaret Kennedy

- Author: Margaret Kennedy
- Language: English
- Genre: Novel
- Publisher: Heinemann
- Publication date: 1924
- Publication place: United Kingdom
- Media type: Print (Hardback and paperback)
- Pages: 344 pp
- Followed by: The Fool of the Family

The Constant Nymph is a 1924 novel by Margaret Kennedy. It tells how a teenage girl, Tessa Sanger, falls in love with a family friend, who eventually marries her cousin. It explores the protagonists' complex family histories, focusing on class, education and creativity.

== Reception and influence ==
The novel sold well from its first appearance, becoming the first novel of a genre sometimes called "Bohemian". Much of its success was due to its then-shocking sexual content, describing scenes of adolescent sexuality and of noble savagery in the Austrian Tyrol.

There is a complimentary allusion to the novel in the 1934 detective story The Nine Tailors by Dorothy L. Sayers. Fifteen-year-old Hilary tells her father she aspires to write novels: "Best sellers. The sort that everybody goes potty over. Not just bosh ones, but like The Constant Nymph." Sayers includes a positive mention by two characters in her 1930 epistolary novel, The Documents in the Case.

The character and appearance of the composer Lewis Dodd was based on the artist Henry Lamb, who was a gifted pianist. Kennedy's cousin George was one of Lamb's oldest friends. Attributes of Albert Sanger were taken from Augustus John, particular the artists' colony he set up in 1911 at Alderney Manor. Kennedy may have been trying to protect herself against accusations of using her friends as models by transferring to both of them the talents of musicians rather than painters.

== Adaptations ==
Margaret Kennedy and Basil Dean adapted The Constant Nymph for a three-act play that was published by Doubleday, Page and Company (Garden City, N.Y.) in 1926. A differently treated, second stage adaptation of the play was published by William Heinemann (London) in 1926. The play was performed on the London stage in 1926 and featured Noël Coward and Edna Best.

The novel was first adapted as a silent film in 1928 by Adrian Brunel and Alma Reville and directed by Brunel and Basil Dean. This version starred Ivor Novello, Mabel Poulton and Benita Hume. It was adapted again in 1933 by Dorothy Farnum and directed by Dean. It featured Victoria Hopper, Brian Aherne and Leonora Corbett. A third film adaptation in 1943 featured Charles Boyer, Joan Fontaine, and Alexis Smith. It was adapted by Kathryn Scola and directed by Edmund Goulding.

In June 1968 the BBC's Saturday Night Theatre series broadcast a version based on the Kennedy/Dean treatment, adapted for radio by Raymond Raikes, directed by Arthur Tatler, with the original incidental music by Eugene Goossens.
