= List of works by W. Somerset Maugham =

W. Somerset Maugham bibliography
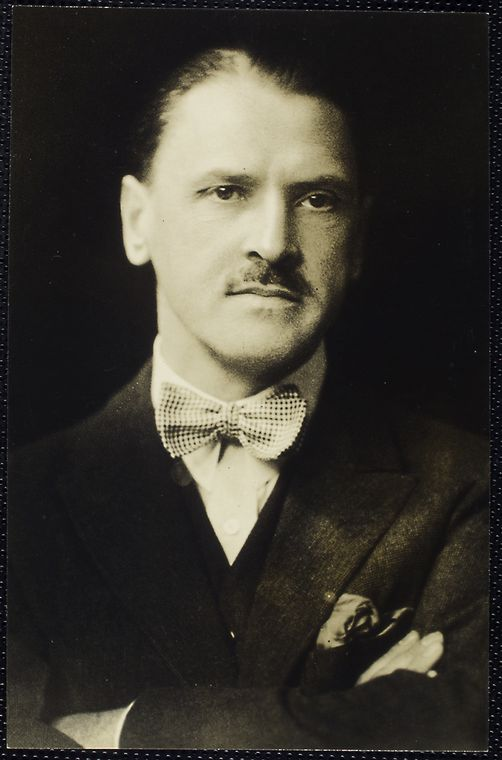
- Books↙: 16
- Novels↙: 20
- Articles↙: 189
- Collections↙: 16
- Plays↙: 25
- Books edited↙: 19
- Unpublished plays↙: 11
- Collected editions↙: 22

W. Somerset Maugham (1874–1965) was a British playwright, novelist and short story writer. Born in the British Embassy in Paris, where his father worked, Maugham was an orphan by the age of ten. He was raised by an uncle, who tried to persuade the youngster to become an accountant or parson; Maugham instead trained as a doctor, although he never practised professionally, as his first novel, Liza of Lambeth, was published the same year he qualified.

A year after his first novel was published Maugham began contributing to magazines and periodicals; initially these were short stories, but he also wrote opinion pieces, non-fictional and autobiographical work, and letters. Much of his non-fictional writing was published in book form, and covered a range of topics, including travel, current affairs, autobiography and belles lettres. Maugham was also editor on a number of works, which often included adding a preface or introductory chapter to the work of other writers. In 1903 his first play was performed, A Man of Honour at the Imperial Theatre, London. It was the first of many of his works that were produced for the stage, and with the later development of cinema, his novels and stories were also adapted for the big screen.

By the time of his death in 1965 Maugham was one of the most commercially successful and gifted writers of the twentieth century, according to Bryan Connon, his biographer; The Times obituarist called Maugham "the most assured English writer of his time", and wrote that "no writer of his generation ... graced the world of English letters with more complete or more polished assurance".

== Novels and story collections ==
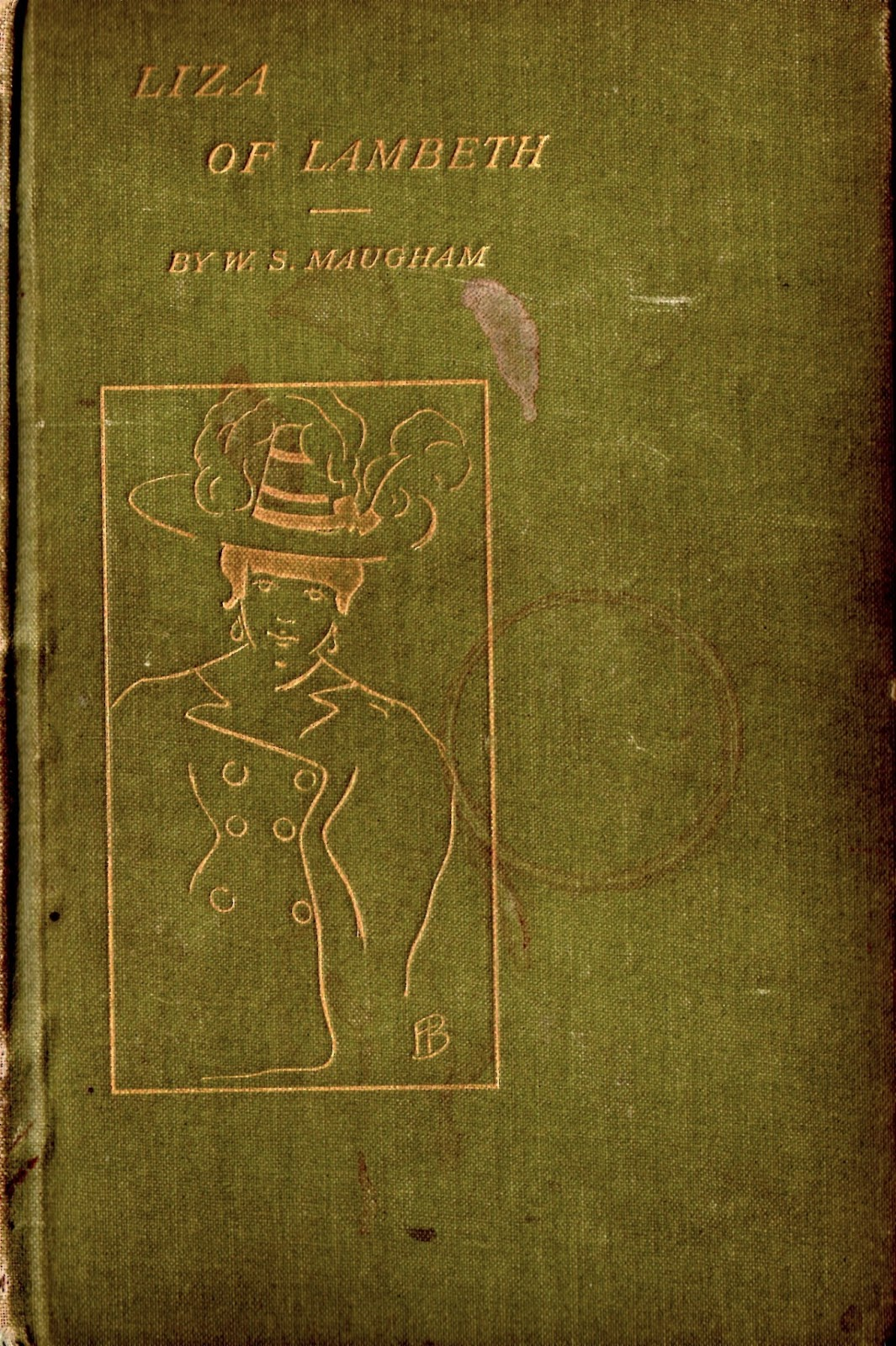
First edition cover of Liza of Lambeth, 1897

Frontispiece for Of Human Bondage, 1915

Frontispiece for The Trembling of a Leaf, 1921

Novels and story collections of W. Somerset Maugham
Title	Year of first publication	First edition publisher (London, unless otherwise stated)	Notes	Ref.
Liza of Lambeth	1897	T. Fisher Unwin	Novel	
The Making of a Saint	1898	T. Fisher Unwin	Novel	
Orientations	1899	T. Fisher Unwin	Short story collection	
The Hero	1901	Hutchinson	Novel	
Mrs Craddock	1902	Heinemann	Novel	
The Merry-Go-Round	1904	Heinemann	Novel	
The Bishop's Apron	1906	Chapman & Hall	Novel	
The Explorer	1908	Heinemann	Novel	
The Magician	1908	Heinemann	Novel	
Of Human Bondage	1915	George H. Doran Company, New York	Novel	
The Moon and Sixpence	1919	Heinemann	Novel	
The Trembling of a Leaf: Little Stories of the South Sea Islands	1921	George H. Doran Company, New York	Short story collection	
The Painted Veil	1925	Heinemann	Novel	
The Casuarina Tree: Six Stories	1926	Heinemann	Short story collection; comprises six stories	
Ashenden: Or the British Agent	1928	Heinemann	Short story collection	
Cakes and Ale: or, the Skeleton in the Cupboard	1930	Heinemann	Novel	
Six Stories Written in the First Person Singular	1931	Doubleday, Doran & Co., Garden City, NY	Short story collection	
The Book Bag	1932	Ray Long & Richard R Smith Inc, New York	Short story collection; comprises 20 stories	
The Narrow Corner	1932	Heinemann	Novel	
Ah King	1933	Heinemann	Short story collection	
The Judgement Seat	1934	Centaur Press	Short story collection	
Cosmopolitans	1936	Doubleday, Doran & Co., Garden City, NY	Short story collection	
Theatre	1937	Heinemann	Novel	
Christmas Holiday	1939	Heinemann	Novel	
Princess September and the Nightingale	1939	Oxford University Press, Oxford	Short story collection	
The Mixture as Before	1940	Heinemann	Short story collection	
Up at the Villa	1941	Heinemann	Novel	
The Hour Before the Dawn	1942	Doubleday, Doran & Co., Garden City, NY	Novel	
The Unconquered	1944	House of Books Ltd, New York	Short story collection	
The Razor's Edge	1944	Heinemann	Novel	
Then and Now	1946	Heinemann	Novel	
Creatures of Circumstance	1947	Heinemann	Short story collection	
Catalina	1948	Heinemann	Novel	
Quartet	1948	Heinemann	Short story collection	
Trio	1950	Heinemann	Short story collection by Maugham, screen adaptation by Maugham, R.C. Sherriff and Noel Langley	
Encore	1951	Heinemann	Short story collection by Maugham, screen adaptation by Maugham, T.E.B Clarke, Arthur Macrae and Eric Ambler	

== Publications in periodicals ==
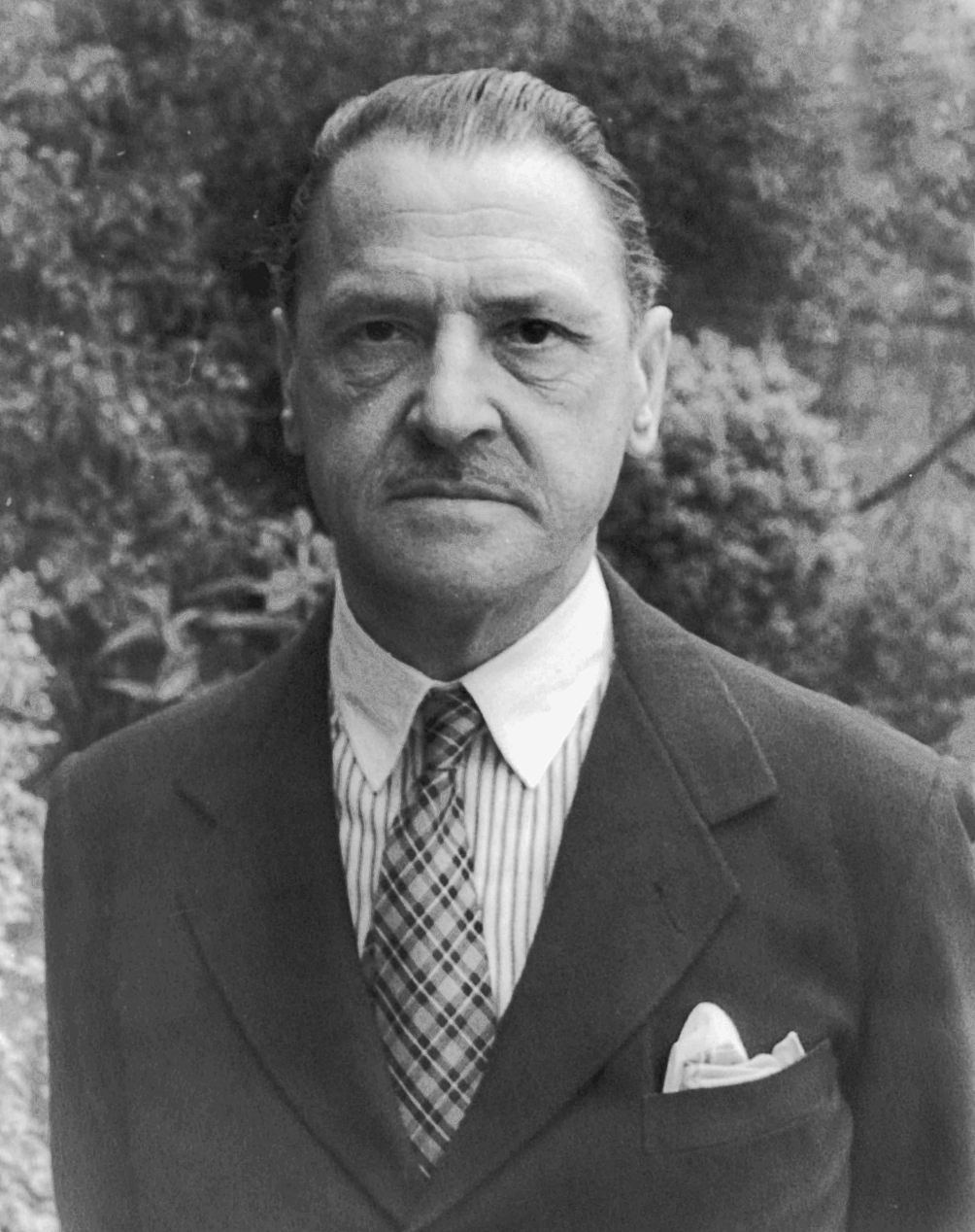
Maugham in 1934

"An Irish Gentleman" in The Strand Magazine, September 1904

Title	Date of publication	Periodical
"Don Sebastian"	October 1898	Cosmopolis: A Literary Review
"Cupid and the Vicar of Swale"	7 February 1900	Punch
"Lady Habart"	9 May 1900	Punch
"The Portrait"	9 November 1900	Lady's Pictorial
"A Really Nice Story"	30 November 1901	Black and White
"The Image of the Virgin"	14 December 1901	Black and White
"Schiffbrüchig"	1903	The Venture
"Pro Patria"	February 1903	The Pall Mall Magazine
"A Man of Honour"	March 1903	The Fortnightly Review
"A Point of Law"	October 1903	The Strand Magazine
"The Criminal"	31 July 1904	Lloyd's Weekly News
"The Course of True Love"	August 1904	The Woman at Home
"An Irish Gentleman"	September 1904	The Strand Magazine
"Told in the Inn at Algeciras"	February 1905	The Woman at Home
"A Rehearsal"	6 December 1905	The Sketch
"Flirtation"	3 February 1906	Daily Mail
"The Fortunate Painter and the Honest Jew"	7 March 1906	Bystander
"A Marriage of Convenience"	23 June 1908	The Illustrated London News
"The Making of a Millionaire"	July 1906	The Lady's Realm
"Good Manners"	May 1907	Windsor Magazine
"Cousin Amy"	March 1908	The Pall Mall Magazine
"The Happy Couple"	May 1908	Cassell's Magazine
"A Traveller in Romance"	1909	Printer's Pie Annual
"The Mother"	April 1909	Story-Teller
"Pygmalion at Home and Abroad"	May 1914	The English Review
"Gerald Festus Kelly: Student of Character"	January 1915	The Studio
"Mackintosh"	November 1920	Cosmopolitan
"Miss Thompson"	April 1921	The Smart Set
"Red"	April 1921	Asia
"On Writing for the Films"	May 1921	North American Review
"The Pool"	September 1921	Cosmopolitan
"Honolulu"	October 1921	Everybody's Magazine
"My South Sea Island"	31 January 1922	Daily Mail
"Foreign Devils"	February 1922	Asia
"Fear"	March 1922	The Century Magazine
"A City Built on a Rock"	March 1922	Youth
"Philosopher"	18 April 1922	McClure's Magazine
"Two Studies – Mr Pete; The Vice-Consul"	8 July 1922	Saturday Review
"Taipan"	October 1922	Pearson's Magazine
"The Princess and the Nightingale"	December 1922	Pearson's Magazine and Good Housekeeping
"Before the Party"	December 1922	Nash's Magazine
"Bewitched" (Note: Later published as "P & O".)	February 1923	International Magazine
"Jane"	April 1923	International Magazine
"The Imposters"	November 1923	Cosmopolitan
"Mayhew"	December 1923	Cosmopolitan
"German Harry"	January 1924	Cosmopolitan
"The Force of Circumstance"	February 1924	International Magazine
"In a Strange Land"	February 1924	Cosmopolitan
"The Luncheon"	March 1924	Nash's Magazine
"The Round Dozen"	March 1924	Good Housekeeping
"The Woman Who Wouldn't Take a Hint"	April 1924	Cosmopolitan
"The Letter"	April 1924	The International Magazine
"A Dream"	May 1924	Cosmopolitan
"The Outstation"	June 1924	International Magazine
"The Happy Man"	June 1924	Cosmopolitan
"Salvatore the Fisherman"	July 1924	Cosmopolitan
"Home From the Sea"	September 1924	Cosmopolitan
"Mr Know-All"	September 1924	Good Housekeeping
"The Ant and the Grasshopper"	October 1924	Cosmopolitan
"Novelist or Bond Salesman"	February 1925	The Bookman
"The Widow's Might"	February 1925	Cosmopolitan
"The Man Who Wouldn't Hurt a Fly"	April 1925	International Magazine
"The Code of a Gentleman"	June 1925	International Magazine
"The Yellow Streak"	August 1925	International Magazine
"The Most Selfish Woman I Knew"	September 1925	International Magazine
"The Man with a Scar"	October 1925	International Magazine
"The Great Man"	January 1926	International Magazine
"The End of the Flight"	January 1926	Harper's Bazaar
"Another Man without a Country"	January 1926	International Magazine
"An Honest Woman"	February 1926	International Magazine
"Consul"	April 1926	The Golden Book Magazine
"The Creative Impulse"	August 1926	Harper's Bazaar
"The Closed Shop"	September 1927	Harper's Bazaar
"Footprints in the Jungle"	September 1927	International Magazine
"Pearls"	February 1927	International Magazine
"Advice to a Young Author"	2 March 1927	The New York Times
"The Traitor"	September 1927	International Magazine
"One of Those Women"	October 1927	International Magazine
"His Excellency"	November 1927	International Magazine
"The Hairless Mexican"	December 1927	International Magazine
"Mr Harrington's Washing"	January 1928	International Magazine
"The British Agent"	February 1928	International Magazine
"The Four Dutchmen"	December 1928	International Magazine
"In Hiding"	January 1929	International Magazine
"A Derelict"	February 1929	International Magazine
"The Extraordinary Sex"	March 1929	International Magazine
"Straight Flush"	June 1929	International Magazine
"The Man Who Made His Mark"	June 1929	International Magazine
"Through the Jungle"	July and August 1929	Britannia and Eve
"Mirage"	October 1929	International Magazine
"A Marriage of Convenience"	December 1929	The Strand Magazine
"On the Road to Mandalay"	December 1929	International Magazine
"Cakes and Ale"	March to July 1930	Harper's Bazaar
"Maltreat the Dead in Fiction"	November 1930	The Literary Digest
"The Human Element"	December 1930	International Magazine
"Virtue"	February 1931	International Magazine
"The Vessel of Wrath"	April 1931	International Magazine
"Maugham Discusses Drama"	May 1931	The Living Age
"Arnold Bennett"	June 1931	Life and Letters
"The Right Thing is the Kind Thing"	July 1931	International Magazine
"The Alien Corn"	August 1931	International Magazine
"The Door of Opportunity"	October 1931	International Magazine
"The Temptation of Neil MacAdam"	February 1932	International Magazine
"The Narrow Corner"	October – December 1932	International Magazine
"For Services Rendered"	13 November – 18 December 1932	Sunday Express
"The Three Fat Women of Antibes"	October 1933	International Magazine
"The Buried Talent"	February 1934	International Magazine
"The Best Ever"	May 1934	International Magazine and Nash's Magazine
"How I Write Short Stories"	28 July 1934	Saturday Review
"The Short Story"	October 1934	Nash's Magazine
"A Casual Affair"	November 1934	Nash's Magazine
"Appearance and Reality"	November 1934	International Magazine
"The Voice of the Turtle"	January 1935	Nash's Magazine
"Gigolo and Gigolette"	March 1935	Nash's Magazine
"The Lotus Eater"	October 1935	Nash's Magazine
"An Official Position"	July 1937	International Magazine
"The Lion's Skin"	November 1937	International Magazine
"The Sanatorium"	December 1938	International Magazine
"The Professional Writer"	29 January 1939	Saturday Review
"Doctor and Patient"	February 1939	International Magazine
"You and Some More Books"	11 March 1939	The Saturday Evening Post
"The Facts of Life"	April 1939	International Magazine
"A Man with a Conscience"	June 1939	International Magazine
"Christmas Holiday"	August – November 1939	Redbook
"Proof Reading as an Avocation"	14 October 1939	Publishers Weekly
"Classic Books of America"	6 January 1940	The Saturday Evening Post
"The Villa on the Hill"	February – April 1940	Redbook
"Britain Views the French Navy"	July 1940	The Living Age
"The Refugee Ship"	September 1940	Redbook
"The Insider Story of the Collapse of France"	October 1940	Redbook
"The Lion at Bay"	November 1940	Redbook
"Reading under Bombing"	November 1940	The Living Age
"Give me a Murder"	28 December 1940	The Saturday Evening Post
"What Tomorrow Holds"	January 1941	Redbook
"They are Strange People"	February 1941	Redbook
"Novelist's Flight from France"	22 March 1941	The Saturday Evening Post
"Little Things of no Consequence"	29 March 1941	The Saturday Evening Post
"We Have Been Betrayed"	5 April 1941	The Saturday Evening Post
"Escape to America"	12 April 1941	The Saturday Evening Post
"Theatre"	May 1941	Redbook
"Mr Tomkin's Sitter"	7 June 1941	The New Yorker
"The Culture that is to Come"	August 1941	Redbook
"An Exciting Prospect"	October 1941	Reader's Digest
"Paintings I Have Liked"	1 December 1941	Life
"The Hour Before Dawn"	December 1941 – April 1942	Redbook
"Why Do You Dislike Us?"	11 April 1942	The Saturday Evening Post
"To Know About England and the English"	13 June 1942	Publishers Weekly
"Morale Made in America"	July 1942	Redbook
"The Happy Couple"	February 1943	Redbook
"Virtue"	April 1943	Redbook
"The Unconquered"	10 April 1943	Collier's
"The Captain and Miss Reid"	June 1943	International Magazine
"Reading and Writing and You"	August 1943	Redbook
"We Have a Common Heritage"	August 1943	Redbook
"The Terrorist"	October 1943	Redbook
"Write about What You Know"	November 1943	Good Housekeeping
"The Razor's Edge"	December 1943 – May 1944	Redbook
"How I Like to Play Bridge"	December 1944	Good Housekeeping
"In Defence of Who-Done-Its"	25 May 1945	Scholastic
"What Reading Can Do For You"	August 1945	Life Story
"The Colonel's Lady"	March 1946	Good Housekeeping
"A Woman of Fifty"	May 1946	Good Housekeeping
"Function of the Writer"	25 May 1946	Writer
"Then and Now"	May – June 1946	International Magazine
"Behind the Story"	June 1946	Wings
"Episode"	March 1947	Good Housekeeping
"The Point of Honour"	March 1947	Good Housekeeping
"What Should a Novel Do?"	3 March 1947	Scholastic
"The Romantic Young Lady"	21 June 1947	Scholastic
"Gustave Flaubert and Madame Bovary"	November 1947	The Atlantic Monthly
"Henry Fielding and Tom Jones"	December 1947	The Atlantic Monthly
"Honoré de Balzac and Old Man Goriot"	January 1948	The Atlantic Monthly
"Emily Brontë and Wuthering Heights"	February 1948	The Atlantic Monthly
"Fyodor Dostoevsky and the Brothers Karamazov"	March 1948	The Atlantic Monthly
"Stendhal and the Red and the Black"	April 1948	The Atlantic Monthly
"Jane Austen and Pride and Prejudice"	May 1948	The Atlantic Monthly
"Herman Melville and Moby Dick"	June 1948	The Atlantic Monthly
"Charles Dickens and David Copperfield"	July 1948	The Atlantic Monthly
"Catalina"	March – December 1948	The Windmill
"Spanish Journey"	11 August 1948	Continental Daily Mail
"Ten Best Sellers"	September 1948	Good Housekeeping
"A Writer's Notebook"	June – August 1949	International Magazine
"Augustus"	Winter 1949/50	Cornhill Magazine
"Zurbaran"	Summer 1950	Cornhill Magazine
"After Reading Burke"	Winter 1950/51	Cornhill Magazine
"Somerset Maugham Tells a Story of the Lady from Poona"	3 May 1951	News Chronicle
"The Bidding Started Slowly"	June 1952	The Connoisseur
Letter to the editor	8 October 1952	John O'London's Weekly
"Looking Back on Eighty Years"	28 January 1954	The Listener
"Somerset Maugham and the Greatest Novels"	June – October 1954	The Sunday Times
"The Perfect Gentleman"	November 1955	Theatre Arts Magazine
"On Having My Portrait Painted"	January 1959	Horizon
"Credo of a Story Teller"	21 March 1959	The Saturday Evening Post
"On the Approach of Middle Age"	15 November 1960	Vogue
"Looking Back"	June – August 1962	Show

== Collected editions ==
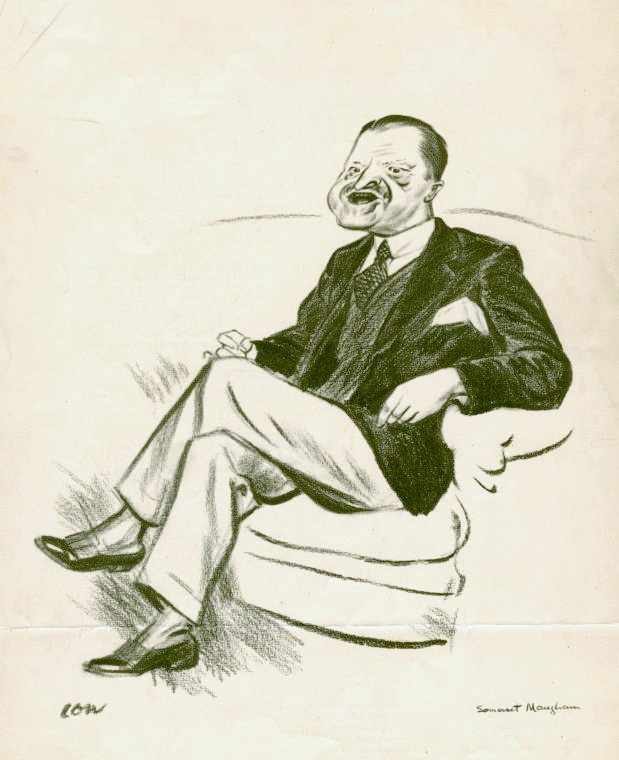
Caricature of Maugham, unknown date

The short story collections of W. Somerset Maugham
Title	Year of first publication	First edition publisher (London, unless otherwise stated)	Notes	Ref.
East and West	1934	Doubleday, Doran & Co., Garden City, NY		
Altogether	1934	Heinemann		
Favourite Short Stories	1937	Doubleday, Doran & Co., Garden City, NY		
The Round Dozen	1939	The Reprint Society		
The Somerset Maugham Sampler	1943	Garden City Publishing, Garden City, NY		
Here and There	1948	Doubleday, Doran & Co., Garden City, NY		
East of Suez	1948	Avon Publishing, New York		
The Maugham Reader	1950	Doubleday, Doran & Co., Garden City, NY		
The Complete Short Stories	1951	Heinemann	Three volumes	
The Collected Plays	1952	Heinemann	Three volumes	
The World Over	1952	Doubleday, Doran & Co., Garden City, NY		
The Selected Novels of W. Somerset Maugham	1953	Heinemann	Three volumes	
The Partial View	1954	Heinemann		
The Travel Books	1955	Heinemann		
Husbands and Wives	1963	Pyramid Publications, New York		
The Sinners	1964	Pyramid Publications, New York		
Selected Prefaces and Introductions	1964	Heinemann		
A Maugham Twelve	1966	Heinemann		
Seventeen Lost Stories	1969	Doubleday, Doran & Co., Garden City, NY		
Maugham's Malaysian Stories	1969	Heinemann, Singapore	edited and with an introduction by Anthony Burgess.	
A Traveller in Romance	1984	Anthony Blond	Uncollected writings, 1901–64	

== Editor ==
Cover and frontispiece for The Venture (1903)

Works which W. Somerset Maugham edited
Title	Year of first publication	Author	First edition publisher (London, unless otherwise stated)	Notes	Ref.
The Venture Annual of Art and Literature	1903		Baillie, London	Co-edited with Laurence Housman	
The Venture Annual of Art and Literature, 1905	1905		Simpkin Marshall, London	Co-edited with Laurence Housman	
The Truth at Last	1924	Charles Hawtrey	Little, New York		
Traveller's Library	1933		Doubleday, Doran New York	Reissued the same year as Fifty Modern English Writers	
Wisdom of Life: An Anthology of Noble Thoughts	1938		Watts, London	With Joseph Frederick Green	
The House with the Green Shutters	1938	George Douglas	Oxford University Press, Oxford	With introduction	
Tellers of Tales: One Hundred Short Stories from the United States, England, France, Russia and Germany	1939		Doubleday, Doran, New York		
Great Modern Reading: W. Somerset Maugham's Introduction to Modern English and American Literature	1943		Doubleday, New York		
David Copperfield	1948	Charles Dickens	Winston, New York		
The History of Tom Jones, a Foundling	1948	Henry Fielding	Winston, New York		
Pride and Prejudice	1949	Jane Austen	Winston, New York		
Old Man Goriot	1949	Honoré de Balzac	Winston, New York		
Wuthering Heights	1949	Emily Brontë	Winston, New York		
The Brothers Karamazov	1949	Fyodor Dostoyevsky	Winston, New York		
Madame Bovary	1949	Gustave Flaubert	Winston, New York		
Moby-Dick	1949	Herman Melville	Winston, New York		
The Red and the Black	1949	Stendhal	Winston, New York		
War and Peace	1949	Leo Tolstoy	Winston, New York		
A Choice of Kipling's Prose	1952	Rudyard Kipling	Macmillan, New York		

== Plays ==
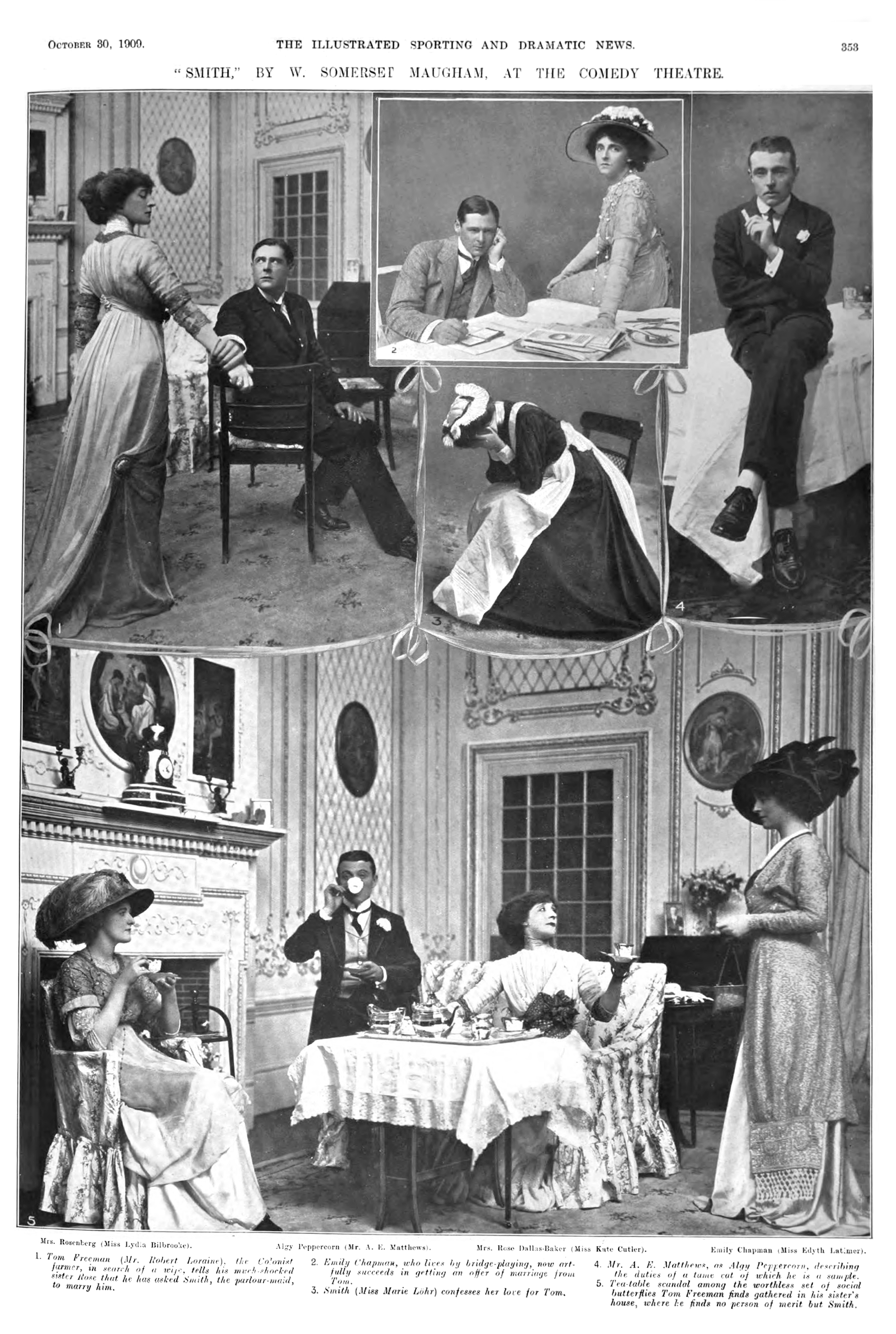
Montage of photographs from the London production of Smith, starring Marie Lohr (1909)

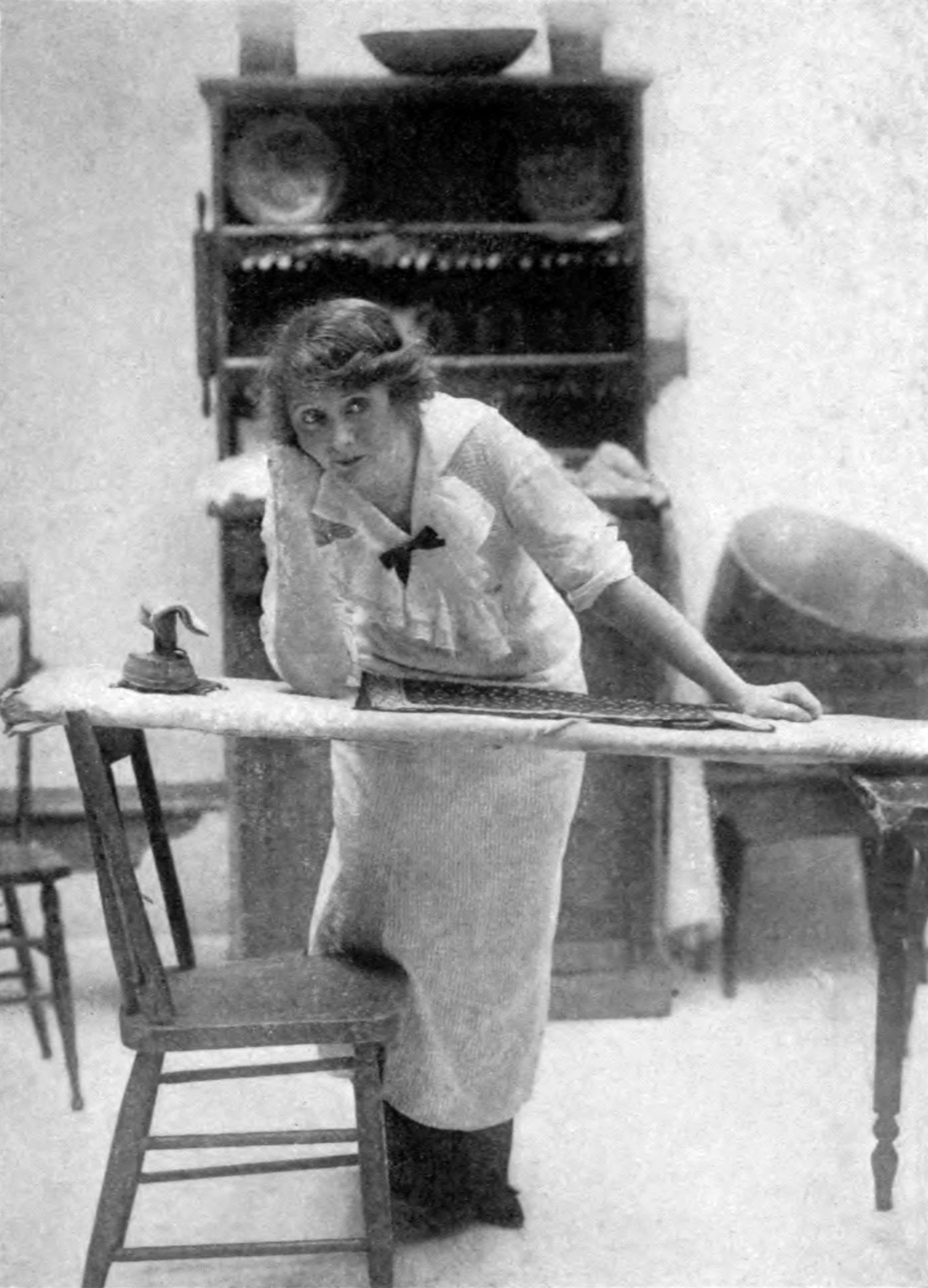
Billie Burke in the Broadway production of The Land of Promise (1913)

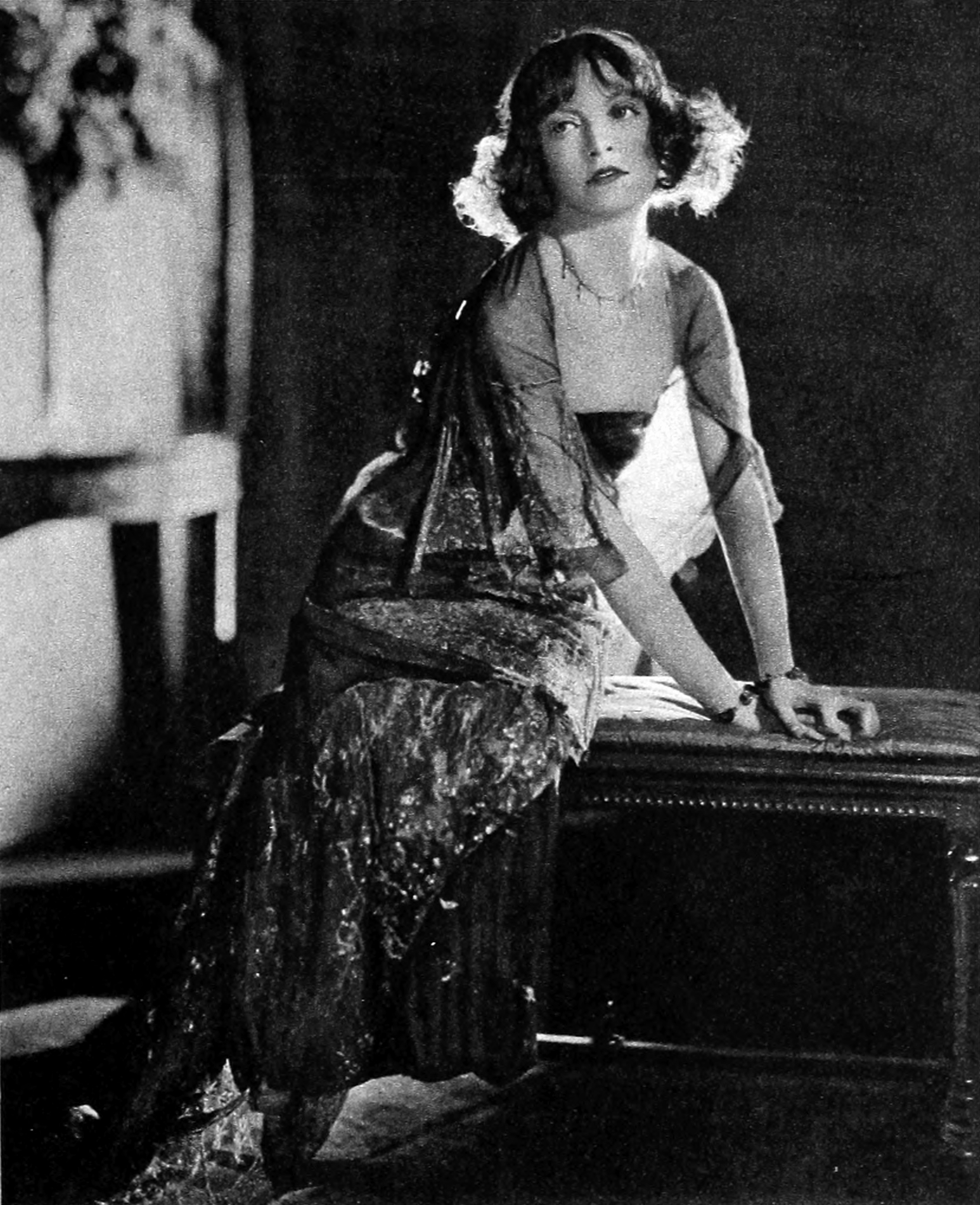
Estelle Winwood in the Broadway production of Too Many Husbands, US title of Home and Beauty (1919)

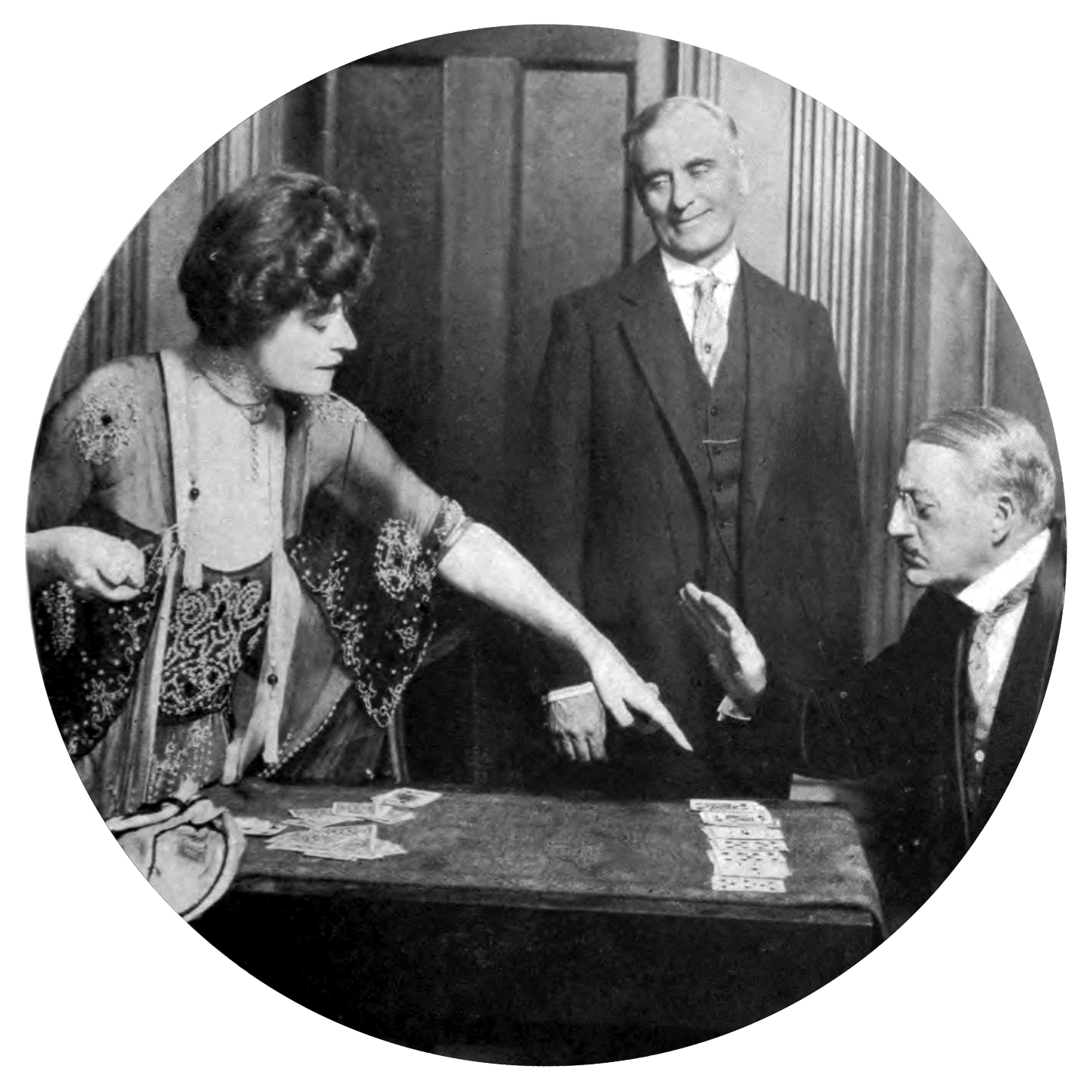
Mrs. Leslie Carter, Ernest Lawford and John Drew in the Broadway production of The Circle (1921)

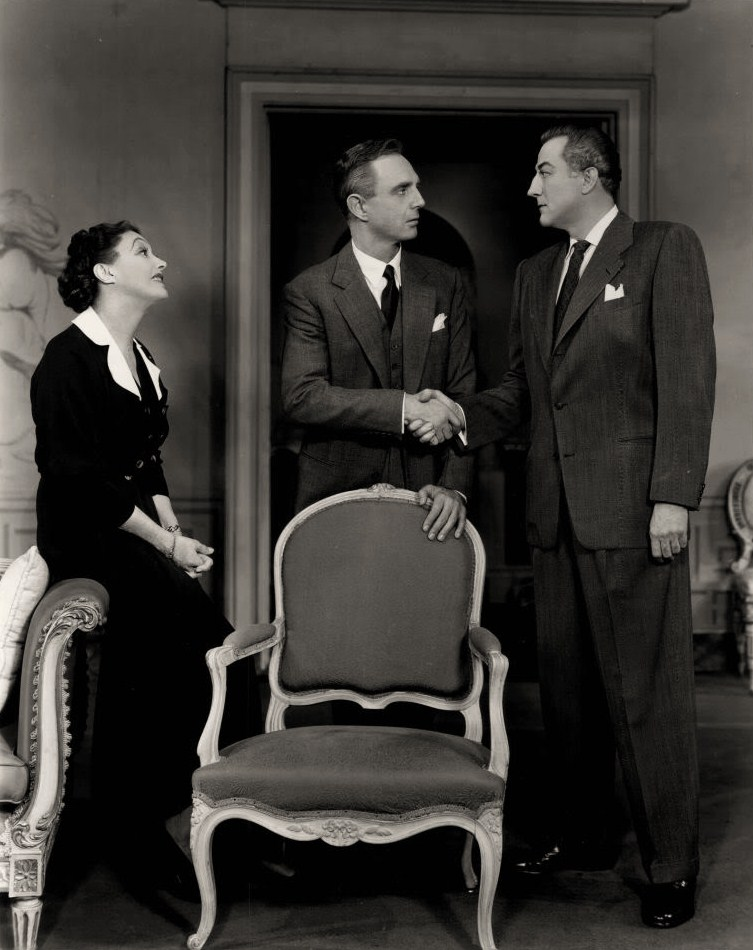
Katharine Cornell, Robert Flemyng and John Emery in a 1953 staging of The Constant Wife

The published plays of W. Somerset Maugham
Title	Date of first performance	Location of first performance	Publisher	Date of publication	Notes	Ref.
A Man of Honour	23 February 1903	Imperial Theatre, London	Chapman & Hall, London	1903	A play in four acts	
Lady Frederick	26 October 1907	Royal Court Theatre	Heinemann, London	1912	A comedy in three acts; written in 1903	
Jack Straw	26 March 1908	Vaudeville Theatre	Heinemann, London	1912	A farce in three acts; written in 1907	
Mrs Dot	26 April 1908	Comedy Theatre	Heinemann, London	1912	A farce in three acts; written in 1904 and originally titled Worthey's Estate	
Penelope	9 January 1909	Comedy Theatre	Heinemann, London	1912	A comedy in three acts; written in 1908 and originally titled Man and Wife	
The Explorer	13 June 1908	Lyric Theatre	Heinemann, London	1912	A melodrama in four acts; written in 1899	
The Tenth Man	24 February 1910	Globe Theatre	Heinemann, London	1913	A tragi-comedy in three acts; written in 1909	
Landed Gentry	15 October 1910	Duke of York's Theatre	Heinemann, London	1913	A comedy in four acts; written in 1910	
Smith	30 September 1909	Comedy Theatre	Heinemann, London	1913	A comedy in four acts; written in 1909	
The Land of Promise	25 December 1913	Lyceum Theatre, New York	Bickers & Son, London	1913	A comedy in four acts	
The Unknown	9 August 1920	Aldwych Theatre	Heinemann, London	1920	A play in three acts; written in 1920	
The Circle	3 March 1921	Haymarket Theatre	Heinemann, London	1921	A comedy in three acts; written in 1919	
Caesar's Wife	27 March 1919	Royalty Theatre	Heinemann, London	1922	A comedy in three acts; written in 1918	
East of Suez	2 September 1922	Her Majesty's Theatre	Heinemann, London	1922	A play in seven scenes; written in 1922	
Our Betters	1917	Hudson Theatre, New York	Heinemann, London	1923	A comedy in three acts; written in 1915	
Home and Beauty	30 August 1919	Globe Theatre, Atlantic City	Heinemann, London	1923	A farce in three acts; written in 1917	
The Unattainable	8 February 1916	New Theatre	Heinemann, London	1923	A farce in three acts; written in 1915	
Loaves and Fishes	24 February 1911	Duke of York's Theatre	Heinemann, London	1924	A comedy in four acts; written in 1902	
The Constant Wife	1 November 1926	Ohio Theatre	George H. Doran Company, New York	1927	A comedy in three acts	
The Letter	24 February 1927	Playhouse Theatre	Heinemann, London	1927	A play in three acts	
The Sacred Flame	November 1928	New York	Doubleday, Doran & Co, New York	1928	A play in three acts	
The Bread-Winner	30 September 1930	Vaudeville Theatre	Heinemann, London	1930	A comedy in one act; written in 1930	
For Services Rendered	1 November 1932	Globe Theatre	Heinemann, London	1932	A play in three acts; written in 1932	
Sheppey	14 September 1933	Wyndham's Theatre	Heinemann, London	1933	A play in three acts; written in 1932	
The Noble Spaniard	20 March 1909	Royalty Theatre	Evans Brothers, London	1953	A comedy in three acts; written in 1908	

Unpublished plays by W. Somerset Maugham
Title	Date of first performance	Location of first performance	Notes
Mademoiselle Zampa	1904	Avenue Theatre	Ran for 20 performances only
A Trip to Brighton	1911	London	Adaptation of a play by Abel Tarride
Mrs. Beamish		Not performed	A comedy in three acts; written in 1917
Under the Circumstances		Not performed	A comedy in three acts
The Keys to Heaven		Not performed	A comedy in three acts; written in 1917
Love in a Cottage	27 January 1918	Globe Theatre	A comedy in three acts; written in 1917
Not To-Night, Josephine!		Not performed	A farce; written in 1919
The Camel's Back	29 October 1923	Worcester Theatre, Worcester, MA	A play in three acts; written in 1924
The Road Uphill		Not performed	A play in three acts; written in 1924
The Force of Nature		Not performed	A play in three acts; written in 1928
The Mask and the Face	May 1933	Colonial Theatre	Adaptation of a play by Luigi Chiarelli

== Non-fiction ==
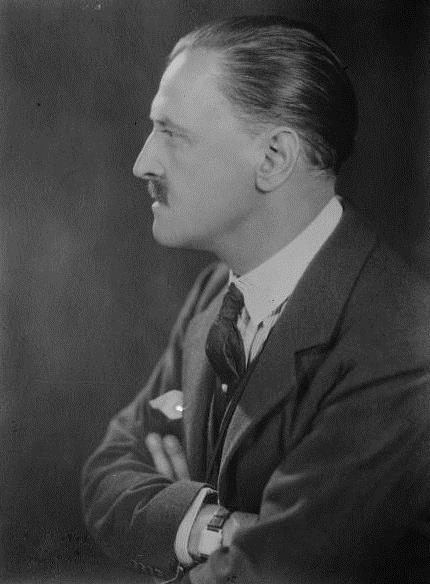
Maugham in his early career

Title	Year of first publication	First edition publisher (London, unless otherwise stated)	Topic	Ref.
The Land of the Blessed Virgin: Sketches and Impressions in Andalusia	1905	Heinemann	Travel	
On a Chinese Screen	1922	Heinemann	Travel	
The Gentleman in the Parlour: A Record of a Journey From Rangoon to Haiphong	1930	Heinemann	Travel	
Don Fernando	1935	Heinemann	Travel	
My South Sea Island	1936	Heinemann	Travel	
The Summing Up	1938	Heinemann	Autobiography	
France at War	1940	Heinemann	Current affairs	
Books and You	1940	Heinemann	Essays	
Strictly Personal	1941	Doubleday, Doran & Co., Garden City, NY	Autobiography	
Of Human Bondage, With a Digression on the Art of Fiction	1946	US Government Printing Office, Washington, DC	Address	
Great Novelists and Their Novels (Note: The UK edition was published in 1954 under the title Ten Novels and Their Authors.)	1948	Winston, New York	Essays	
A Writer's Notebook	1949	Heinemann	Belles lettres	
The Writer's Point of View	1951	Cambridge University Press	Essays	
The Vagrant Mood	1952	Heinemann	Essays	
Points of View	1958	Heinemann	Essays	

== Notes and references ==
Notes

== Sources ==
- Ashley, Mike (September 2008). "W. Somerset Maugham". The Book and Magazine Collector (98). Metropolis International.
- Calder, Robert L. (1990). "W. Somerset Maugham". In Beum, Robert (ed.). Modern British Essayists. Detroit: Gale Research. ISBN 978-0-8103-4580-5.
- Connon, Bryan (2004). "Maugham, (William) Somerset". Oxford Dictionary of National Biography (online ed.). Oxford University Press. doi:10.1093/ref:odnb/34947. (Subscription, Wikipedia Library access or UK public library membership required.)
- Occhiogrosso, Frank (1989). "W. Somerset Maugham". In Benstock, Bernard; Staley, Thomas (eds.). British Mystery Writers, 1920–1939. Detroit: Gale Research. ISBN 978-0-7876-3072-0.
- Raphael, Frederic (1976). Somerset Maugham and His World. London: Thames & Hudson Ltd. ISBN 978-0-500-13059-9.
- Sanders, Charles (1982). "W. Somerset Maugham". In Weintraub, Stanley (ed.). Modern British Dramatists, 1900–1945. Detroit: Gale Research. ISBN 978-0-8103-0937-1.
- Simpkins, Scott (1985). "W. Somerset Maugham". In Staley, Thomas F. (ed.). British Novelists, 1890–1929. Detroit: Gale Research. ISBN 978-0-8103-1714-7.
- Stott, Raymond Toole (1973). A Bibliography of the Works of W. Somerset Maugham. London: Kaye & Ward. ISBN 978-0-7182-0950-6.
- Thomas, Lew (June 1990). "W. Somerset Maugham". The Book and Magazine Collector (75). Diamond Publishing Group.
