= At the Seaside =

At the Seaside may refer to:

- At the Seaside (Chase painting), a c. 1892 painting by William Merritt Chase
- At the Seaside (Brooks painting), a 1914 painting by Romaine Brooks
