= John Ellingham Brooks =

English pianist and classical scholar (1863–1929)

- Born: 3 June 1863
- Died: 31 May 1929 (aged 65); Capri, Italy (Island)
- Occupation: Classical scholar
- Spouse: Romaine Brooks (m. 1903-div. 1904)

John Ellingham Brooks (3 June 1863 – 31 May 1929) was an English classical scholar. He was an associate and lover of Somerset Maugham, whom he met when they were both studying in Heidelberg in 1890. In later life, he was part of the circle of expatriates based on the Italian island of Capri, where he shared a villa with the novelist Edward Frederic Benson.

== Biography ==
Brooks was educated at St. Paul's College in Stony Stratford and at Peterhouse, Cambridge. He was admitted at Lincoln's Inn in 1887 and passed the Roman Law examination in 1889. He was admitted as a researcher at the British School at Athens in the late 1890s.

Fearing prosecution as a homosexual following the trial of Oscar Wilde in 1895, Brooks moved to the island of Capri. He formed a friendship with the American heiress and painter Romaine Goddard when she visited in 1899. When she returned to Capri in 1903, she found that Brooks had fallen upon hard times and had been reduced to "selling his possessions to buy food." In what E. F. Benson described as a "fit of aberration on the part of the bride and the bridegroom alike," the two were married in Capri on 13 June 1903. The marriage had ended by September 1904, but the allowance of 300 pounds per year that Romaine Brooks gave to her former husband was enough to allow him to live out the rest of his days on Capri. He died of liver cancer on 31 May 1929.

Brooks' artistic ambitions had amounted to little by the time of his death. E. F. Benson remarked, however, that "Somewhere beneath the ash of his laziness there burned the authentic fire."

== Relationship with Somerset Maugham ==
Brooks stayed at a pension (boarding house) in Heidelberg in 1890, where he formed a close relationship with the young Somerset Maugham. His relationship with Maugham was Maugham's first sexual experience and influenced his literary tastes:

Ellingham Brooks was a homosexual esthete, short like Maugham but with a noble Byronic forehead, curly chestnut hair, sensual lips, and enough money to travel and cultivate his tastes. He and Maugham talked of art and literature and of Italy and Greece. He fired the younger man's imagination and became the arbiter of his tastes.

— Ted Morgan, Somerset Maugham, p. 23

The character Hayward in Maugham's Of Human Bondage, an "esthete who is just back from Germany and admires Pater" and influences Philip, the young protagonist, is "obviously based on Ellingham Brooks." Five years later, Maugham and Brooks crossed paths again in Capri:

Somerset Maugham, who was a regular visitor, captured the dark side in his classic short story "The Lotus Eater," about a British bank manager who throws over his life in London to live in Capri and swears to commit suicide when his money runs out. But years of indolent island living sap his willpower, and he spends his last days in poverty and degradation. The character was based on Maugham's friend and lover, John Ellingham Brooks, who came to Capri as part of an exodus of homosexuals from England in the wake of Oscar Wilde's conviction, in 1895, for "acts of gross indecency." Brooks, however, escaped the fate of Maugham's character by marrying a Philadelphia heiress who, though she quickly divorced him, left Brooks an annuity that allowed him to spend out his days on Capri, playing the piano and walking his fox terrier.

— Tony Perrottet, "The Lure of Capri", Smithsonian Magazine, April 2011

Maugham disapproved of Brooks' indolent life in Capri and based the protagonist of the unflattering short story "The Lotus-Eater" on him. In The Summing Up, Maugham called Brooks "Brown" and wrote "For twenty years he amused himself with thinking what he would write when he really got down to it, and for another twenty with what he would have written if the fates had been kinder."
