= The Lotus Eater =

Short story by W. Somerset Maugham

"The Lotus Eater" is a short story by British author W. Somerset Maugham in 1935 and loosely based on the life story of John Ellingham Brooks. It was included in the 1940 collection of Maugham stories The Mixture as Before.

== Plot summary ==
The story begins in 1913 with the narrator's visit to a friend on the island of Capri in Italy. The friend introduces the narrator to Thomas Wilson, who had come to the island for a holiday fifteen years earlier. A year after that holiday, Wilson had given up his job in London as a bank manager to live a life of simplicity and enjoyment in a small cottage on Capri. Enchanted by the island during his visit, he had made the decision during the intervening year to forgo working another twelve or thirteen years for his pension and instead to take his accumulated savings and purchase at once an annuity that would allow him to live simply on Capri for twenty-five years. And what will happen at the end of that twenty-five years, fifteen of which have already passed, asks the narrator; many men die by sixty, but many do not. Wilson does not directly answer the question, but he implies that if nature does not carry him off by the age of sixty, he will be content to dispatch himself, having lived a life of his own choosing in the meantime. The narrator of the story is stunned by such a bold plan, all the more because Wilson has the appearance and manner of an unremarkable, ordinary man – very much that of the bank manager he once was.

The narrator soon leaves Capri, and, what with the intervening world war and other events, nearly forgets his acquaintance with Wilson until thirteen years later, when he revisits his friend on Capri. By then, of course, the ten years that remained of Wilson's bargain with fate have expired. His friend describes for the narrator what has happened in his absence.

Wilson, his annuity exhausted, had first sold all that he owned; then he had relied on his excellent credit to borrow sums of the islanders to sustain himself; but at the end of a year after the expiration of his annuity, he could no longer even borrow. Wilson then had shut himself in his cottage and lit a charcoal fire to fill the room with carbon monoxide in an attempt to kill himself. But he lacked the will, the narrator says, to make a good-enough job of the attempt, and survived, though with brain damage that left him mentally abnormal but not unbalanced enough for the asylum. He lives out the remainder of his years in the woodshed of his peasant former landlord, carrying water and feeding the animals. As the narrator and his friend walk along, nearing the end of the tale, the friend warns him to betray no sign of his knowledge of Wilson's presence; the confused and degraded man is crouching nearby behind a tree, like a hunted animal. After six years of this existence, he is found dead on the ground overlooking the beautiful Faraglioni (coastal rock formations) that had enticed him to the island so many years before – slain perhaps, the narrator suggests, by their beauty.

The narrator had told Wilson shortly after meeting him that his own choice would have been the safe one: to work the additional dozen or more years that would have secured his pension and, thus, a guarantee of enough money to live on, however long that might be, before setting out for his idyll on Capri, even though, as Wilson said, the pleasures of a man in his thirties are different from those of a man in his fifties. But it is not to Wilson's original choice that the narrator attributes the tragedy of Wilson's final years; he applauds Wilson for having had the nerve to make of his life what he wanted instead of following society's approved path. The narrator speculates that Wilson might indeed have had the kind of resolve needed to carry out his decision to end his own life, if necessary, at the time he first enacted his bold plan to leave his workaday life in London for the full-time leisure that, Wilson had argued, is all anyone is working for anyway. But the very ease and indolence of his life on Capri had deprived him of the will he needed to carry out his decision when the time came. Without challenge, the narrator argues, human will grow flabby, just as muscles used to support one only on level ground will lose the capacity to climb a mountain.

The story's name is a reference to the Lotus eaters of Greek Mythology, who similarly had a life of indolence.

== See also ==
- W. Somerset Maugham bibliography
- Lotus eaters
