= Loaves and Fishes =

1902 play by W. Somerset Maugham

Loaves and Fishes: A Comedy in Four Acts is a play by W. Somerset Maugham. It was written around 1902 before being adapted into the novel The Bishop's Apron (1906). The play was first produced in 1911, and published in its own right in 1924.
