= At the Seaside (Brooks painting) =

Self-portrait by Romaine Brooks (1914)

- Self-portrait
- Artist: Romaine Brooks
- Year: 1914
- Medium: Oil on canvas
- Movement: Post-Impressionism
- Location: Centre Georges Pompidou
- Website: https://www.centrepompidou.fr/fr/ressources/oeuvre/cMLLpq

At the Seaside (French: Au bord de la mer) is a self-portrait oil on canvas painting by Romaine Brooks. It is currently housed at the Centre Georges Pompidou in Paris.

== Description ==
The woman depicted is Brooks, then 40 years old, alone and standing next to an icy beach. The painting is primarily in shades of blue and gray. Her face is so pale it blends into the overcast sky; her dark cloak is wrapped around her body. She looks directly at the viewer.

== Analysis ==
Brooks often used the romantic image of a figure in isolation in her work. At the Seaside has been described as her most vulnerable work. The woman seems timid, emotional, and fragile.

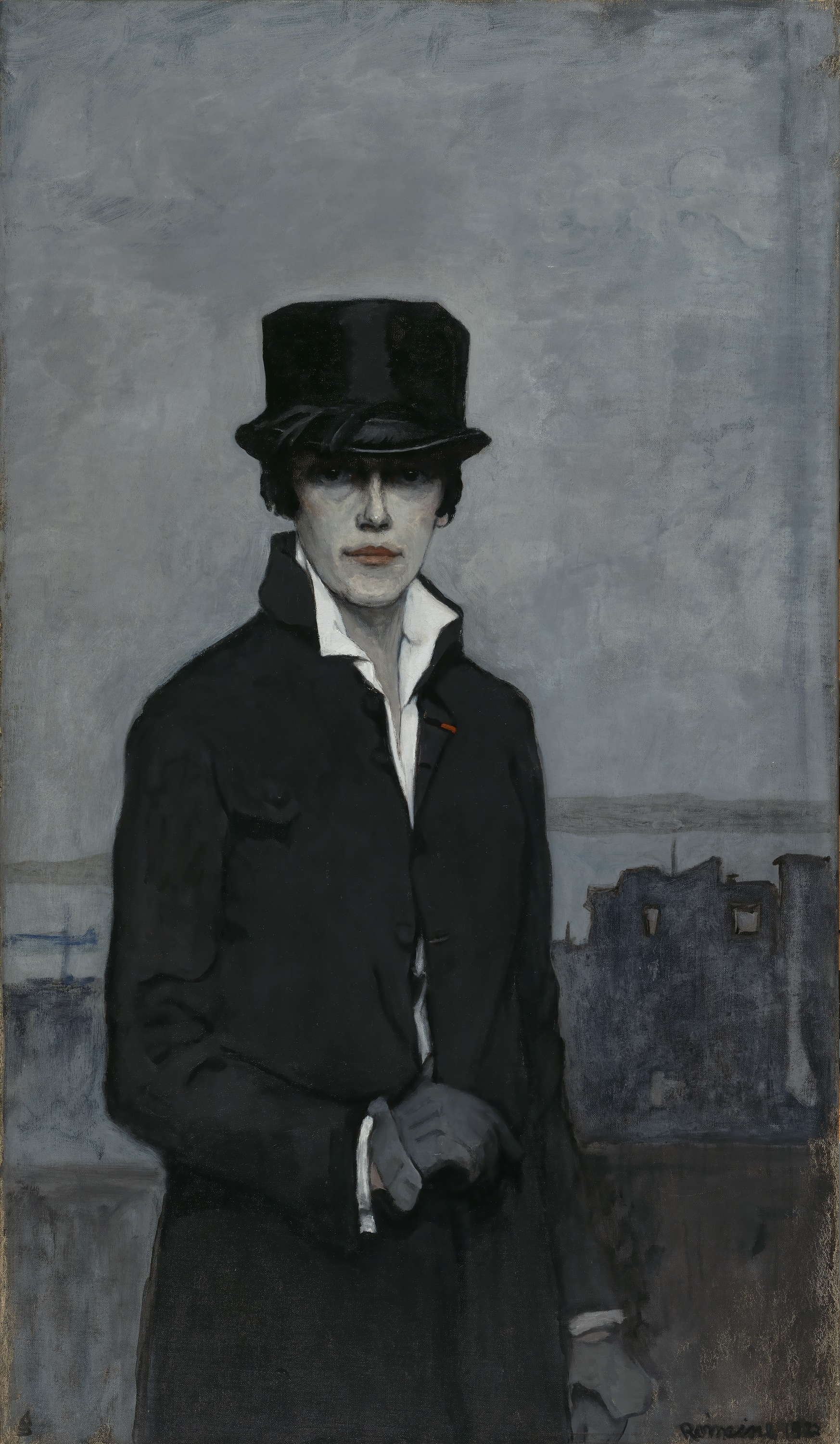
Brooks' 1923 self-portrait

=== Androgyny ===
Brooks often painted androgynous female figures. She was a lesbian, and she explored this aspect of herself through her work. In At the Seaside, she paints herself with short hair and features that are not overtly feminine nor masculine. Her figure is obscured by the long cloak.

Nonetheless, Brooks is still identifiable as a girl in this self-portrait. Her 1923 self-portrait, painted nearly a decade later, is even more androgynous. Here, her hair is completely covered by a large hat, and her figure is covered by a loose suit.

=== Color scheme ===
Brooks is well known today for her monochromatic portraits of women. Around 1910, she met Gabriele d’Annunzio, an Italian painter and writer, who influenced her to begin painting exclusively in shades of gray. Her portrait of d’Annunzio in 1912 matches in color scheme of At the Seaside. About d’Annunzio, Brooks stated he “changed the world about me and lifted me out of a state of deep despondency."

== Reception ==
One art historian compared At the Seaside to a sapphic version of the Mona Lisa; both feature female subjects with coy, slight smiles that make eye contact with the viewer. It has been also described as feminist for its unapologetic portrayal of a lesbian in the early 20th century.

== In popular culture ==
- At the Seaside is used in the cover art of the 2015 biography Romaine Brooks: A Life by author Cassandra Langer.
- In 2023, At the Seaside was featured in the Pompidou's "Over the Rainbow" exhibit of queer art
