= Ten Novels and Their Authors =

1954 work of literary criticism by William Somerset Maugham

- First UK edition (1954)
- Author: W. Somerset Maugham
- Original title: Great Novelists and Their Novels
- Language: English
- Genre: Essays
- Publisher: Winston (US); Heinemann (UK)
- Publication date: New York (1948); London (1954)
- Publication place: United States; United Kingdom

Ten Novels and Their Authors (originally published as Great Novelists and Their Novels) is a 1948 work of literary criticism by William Somerset Maugham. Maugham collects together what he considers to have been the ten greatest novels and writes about the books and the authors. The ten novels are:

1. The History of Tom Jones, a Foundling by Henry Fielding (1749)
2. Pride and Prejudice by Jane Austen (1813)
3. The Red and the Black by Stendhal (1830)
4. Le Père Goriot by Honoré de Balzac (1835)
5. David Copperfield by Charles Dickens (1849)
6. Madame Bovary by Gustave Flaubert (1856)
7. Moby-Dick by Herman Melville (1851)
8. Wuthering Heights by Emily Brontë (1847)
9. The Brothers Karamazov by Dostoevsky (1880)
10. War and Peace by Tolstoy (1869)

This book was originally a series of magazine articles commissioned by Redbook.
