= The History of Tom Jones, a Foundling =

1749 novel by Henry Fielding

Tom Jones
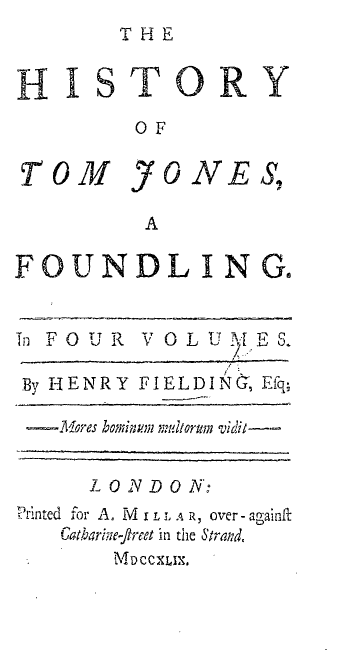
- Title page from the 1749 edition
- Author: Henry Fielding
- Original title: The History of Tom Jones, a Foundling
- Language: English
- Genre: Novel
- Publisher: Andrew Millar
- Publication date: 28 February 1749
- Publication place: England
- Text: Tom Jones at Wikisource

The History of Tom Jones, a Foundling, often known simply as Tom Jones, is a comic novel by English playwright and novelist Henry Fielding. It is a Bildungsroman and a picaresque novel. It was first published on 28 February 1749 in London and is among the earliest English works to be classified as a novel. It is the earliest novel mentioned by W. Somerset Maugham in his 1948 book Great Novelists and Their Novels, in which Maugham ranks the ten best novels of the world.

The novel is highly organised despite its length. Samuel Taylor Coleridge argued that it has one of the "three most perfect plots ever planned", alongside Oedipus Rex by Sophocles and The Alchemist by Ben Jonson. It became a best-seller, with four editions published in its first year alone. It is generally regarded as Fielding's greatest book and as an influential English novel.

== Plot ==
The wealthy Squire Allworthy and his sister Bridget are introduced in their estate in Somerset. Allworthy returns from London after an extended business trip and finds an abandoned baby sleeping in his bed. He summons his housekeeper, Mrs Deborah Wilkins, to take care of the child. After searching the nearby village Mrs Wilkins is told about Jenny Jones, the young servant of a schoolmaster and his wife, as the most likely person to have committed the deed. Jenny is brought before the Allworthys and admits being the one who put the baby in the bed, but refuses to reveal the father's identity. Mr. Allworthy removes Jenny to a place where her reputation will be unknown and tells Bridget to raise the boy, whom he names Thomas, in his household.

Two brothers, Dr Blifil and Captain Blifil, regularly visit the Allworthy estate. The doctor introduces the captain to Bridget in the hope of marrying into Allworthy's wealth. The couple soon marries. After the marriage, Captain Blifil begins to show a coldness to his brother, who eventually feels obliged to leave the house for London. He does, and later dies "of a broken heart." Captain Blifil and Bridget start to grow cool towards one another, and the former is found dead from apoplexy one evening after taking his customary evening stroll before dinner. By then, he has fathered a boy who grows up with Tom. Captain Blifil's son, known as Master Blifil, is a jealous boy who conspires against Tom.

Tom grows into a youth. He tends to be closer friends with the servants and gamekeepers than with members of the gentry. He is close friends with Black George, who is the gamekeeper. His first love is Molly, Black George's second daughter. She throws herself at Tom, who then feels obliged to offer her his protection after learning that she is pregnant. However, Tom later realizes that Molly is somewhat promiscuous. He then falls in love with a neighbouring squire's daughter, Sophia Western. Tom and Sophia confess their love for each other after he breaks his arm rescuing her. Tom's status as a bastard causes Sophia's father and Allworthy to disapprove their love. (Note: This class friction gives Fielding an opportunity for biting social commentary. The inclusion of prostitution and sexual promiscuity in the plot was also novel for its time, and it was the foundation for criticism of the book's "lowness.")

Squire Allworthy falls ill and is convinced that he is dying. His family and servants gather around his bed as he disposes of his wealth. He gives a favourable amount of it to Tom, which displeases Master Blifil. Tom does not care about what he has been given, since his only concern is Allworthy's health. Allworthy's health improves and he learns that he will live. Tom is so excited that he gets drunk and eventually fights with Master Blifil. Meanwhile, Bridget dies in London. Wanting to conceal her love for Tom, Sophia gives a majority of her attention to Blifil when the three of them are together. This leads to Sophia's aunt, Mrs Western, believing that Sophia and Blifil are in love. Squire Western wants Sophia to marry Blifil to gain property from the Allworthy estate. Blifil learns of Sophia's affection for Tom and is angry. Blifil lies to Allworthy, telling him that, on the day he almost died, Tom was out drinking and celebrating his coming death. This leads Tom to be banished.

Tom's banishment seems to ensure that Sophia will be forced to marry Blifil, whom she finds odious, so she flees to avoid that fate. Meanwhile, expelled from Allworthy's estate, Tom begins his adventures across Britain, eventually ending up in London. En route, he meets a barber, Partridge, who was banished from town because he was thought to be Tom's father. He becomes Tom's faithful companion in the hope of restoring his reputation. During their journey, they end up at an inn. While they are there, a lady and her maid arrive. An angry man arrives, and the chambermaid points him in the direction that she thinks he needs to go. He bursts in on Tom and Mrs Waters, a woman whom Tom rescued, in bed together. The man, however, was looking for Mrs Fitzpatrick and leaves. Sophia and her maid arrive at the same inn, and Partridge unknowingly reveals the relationship between Tom and Mrs Waters. Sophia leaves with Mrs Fitzpatrick, who is her cousin, and heads for London. They arrive at the home of Lady Bellaston, followed by Tom and Partridge. Lady Bellaston seduces Tom, causing more heartache for Sophia. Tom reiterates, yet again, that his true love is for Sophia and no one else. Tom ends up getting into a duel with Mr Fitzpatrick, which leads to Tom's brief imprisonment. Blifil hires thugs to impress Tom into service at sea, but Tom avoids that fate.

Eventually, the secret of Tom's birth is revealed after a brief scare involving Mrs Waters. Mrs Waters is really Jenny Jones, Tom's supposed mother, and Tom fears that he committed incest. This, however, is not the case, as Tom's mother had in fact been Bridget, who had conceived him with a young man who died around the time that Tom was born. Tom is thus Squire Allworthy's nephew. After finding out about the villainy of Blifil, Allworthy decides to disown Blifil and bestow most of his inheritance on Tom. After Tom's true parentage is revealed, he and Sophia marry, as Squire Western no longer harbours any misgivings about Tom marrying his daughter. Sophia bears Tom a son and a daughter, and the couple live on happily with the blessings of Squire Western and Squire Allworthy.

== Style ==
The highly visible narrator is a central feature of Tom Jones. Each book begins with a prefatory chapter directly addressing the reader, and the narrator provides a continuous commentary on characters and events. According to Wayne C. Booth, the reader's relationship with the narrator is something like a subplot. The reader becomes more attached to the narrator over the course of the book, culminating in a heartfelt farewell.

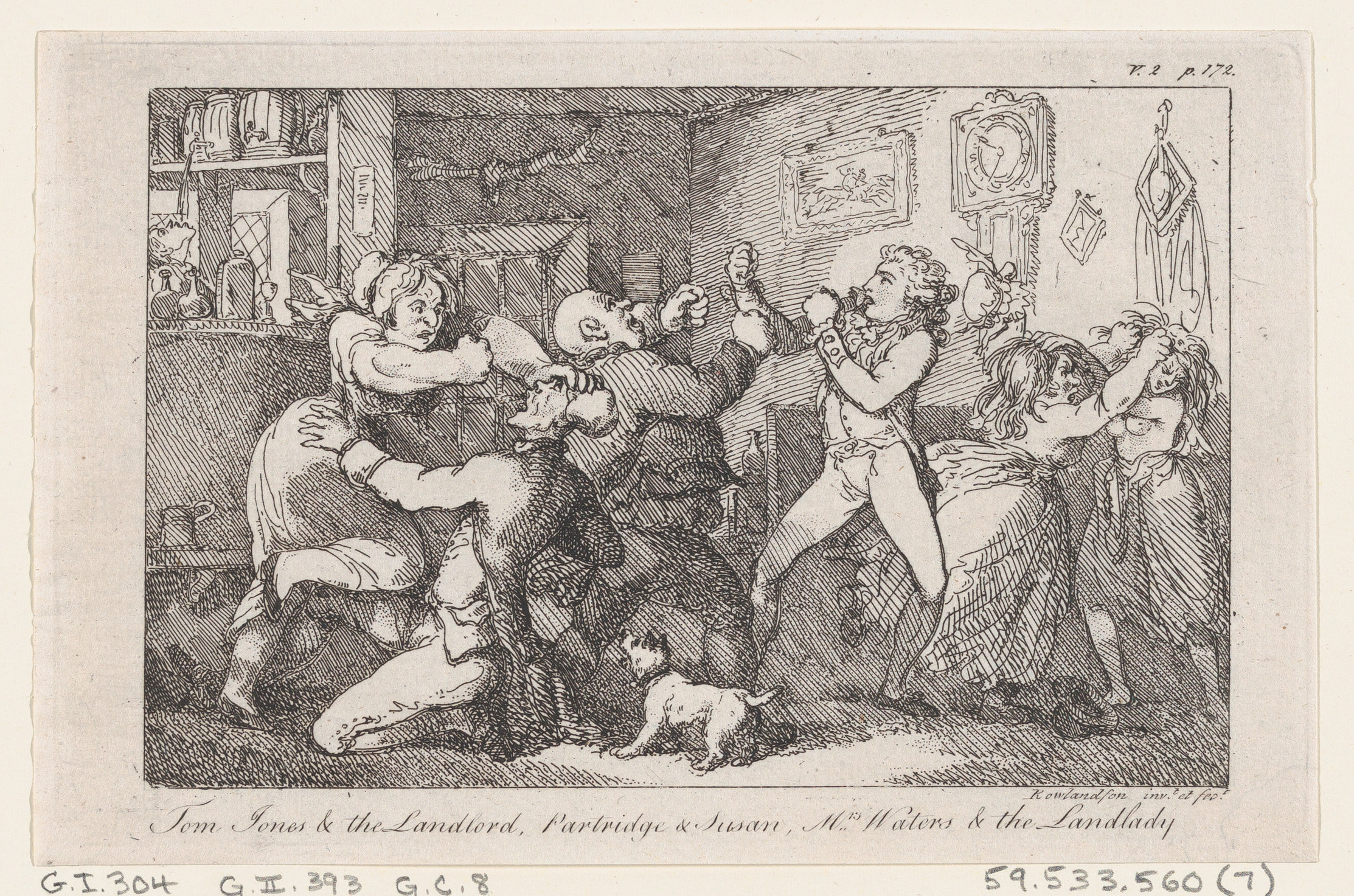
The fight at the inn at Upton

Fielding presents a panorama of contemporary British life, drawing characters from many different classes and occupations. Lady Bellaston, for instance, is widely believed to have been inspired by the real life character of Etheldreda Townshend. But Ian Watt argues in The Rise of the Novel that Fielding did not aim at the "realism of presentation" of lifelike detail and psychology practised by authors such as Richardson. Watt claims that Fielding was more focused on the "realism of assessment," the way in which the novel engages a broad range of topics with intelligence and "a wise assessment of life."

== Themes ==
The main theme of the novel is the contrast between Tom Jones's good nature, flawed but eventually corrected by his love for virtuous Sophia Western, and his half-brother Blifil's hypocrisy. Secondary themes include several other examples of virtue (especially that of Squire Allworthy), hypocrisy (especially that of Thwackum) and villainy (for example, that of Mrs Western and Ensign Northerton), sometimes tempered by repentance (for instance Square and Mrs Waters née Jones).

Both introductory chapters to each book and interspersed commentary introduce a long line of further themes. For instance, introductory chapters dwell extensively on bad writers and critics, quite unrelated to the plot but apologetic to the author and the novel itself; and authorial commentary on several characters shows strong opposition to Methodism, calling it fanatical and heretical, and falsely implying an association between Methodism and hypocrites such as the younger Blifil.

The novel takes place against the backdrop of the Jacobite rising of 1745. Characters take different sides over the rebellion, which was an attempt to restore Roman Catholicism as the established religion of England and to undo the Glorious Revolution. At one point Sophia Western is even mistaken for Jenny Cameron, the supposed lover of Bonnie Prince Charlie. Good-natured characters are often moderately loyalist and Anglican, or even supporters of the House of Hanover, while ill-natured characters (Mrs Western) or mistaken ones (Partridge) can be Jacobites, or (like Squire Western) anti-Hanoverian.

== List of characters ==
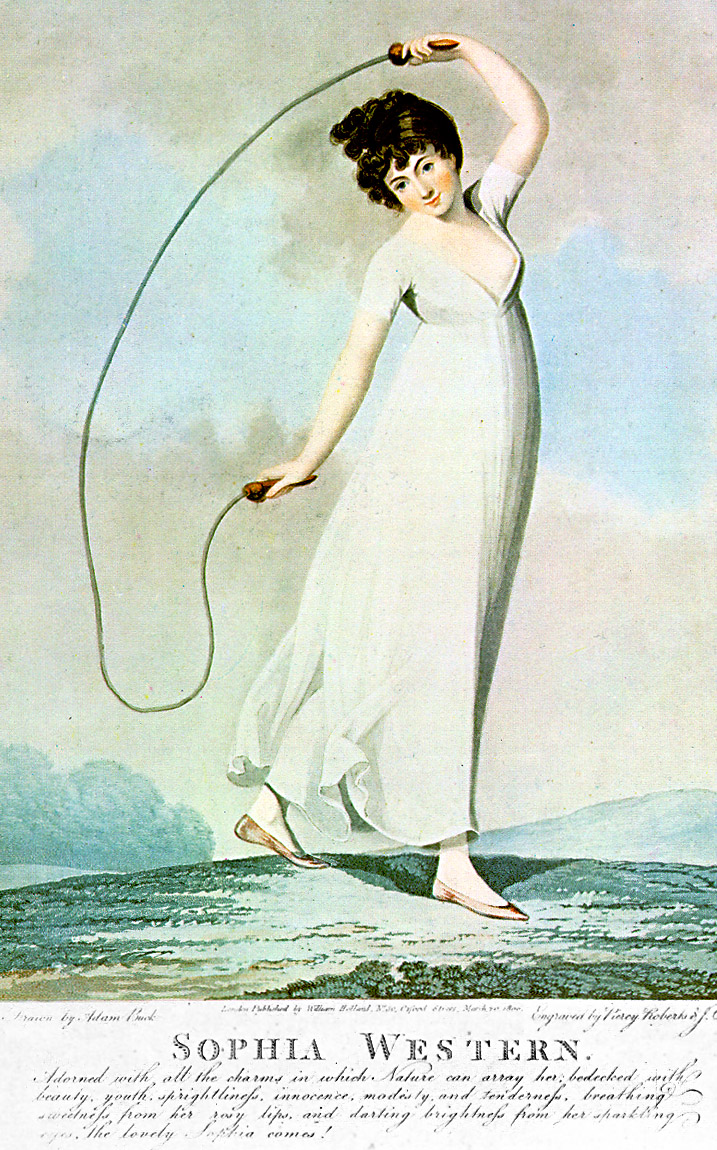
Caption at bottom: SOPHIA WESTERN: "Adorned with all the charms in which Nature can array her, bedecked with beauty, youth, sprightliness, innocence, modesty and tenderness, breathing sweetness from her rosy lips and darting brightness from her sparkling eyes, the lovely Sophia comes!" This depicts the heroine of the novel, but shows her in the latest fashions of 1800, rather than in the historically accurate hoop skirts of 1749 – it would have been extremely difficult to skip in the clothing styles (and high-heeled shoes) of 1749... The dishevelment of her clothes in the picture was not meant to contradict the word "modesty" in the caption, but was supposed to be understood as being the accidental and unintentional effect of her strenuous physical activity.

- Master Thomas "Tom" Jones, a bastard and Squire Allworthy's ward
- Miss Sophia "Sophy" Western /ˌsoʊˈfaɪə/, Western's only daughter, the model of virtue, beauty and all good qualities. It is widely accepted that the model for Sophia is Charlotte Cradock, Henry Fielding's wife.
- Master William Blifil /ˈblɪfəl/, the son of Captain Blifil and Bridget; a hypocrite and Tom Jones's rival
- Squire Allworthy, the wealthy squire of an estate in Somerset and Tom's guardian; of irreproachable character and good nature
- Squire Western, a wealthy squire and huntsman who owns an estate bordering on Squire Allworthy's; a simpleton who wants to marry his daughter Sophia to Allworthy's heir (first Blifil and then Jones)
- Miss Bridget Allworthy (later Mrs Blifil), Allworthy's sister
- Lady Bellaston, Tom's lover and a leading figure in London society, who tries to force Sophia into marriage to a lord by having her raped by him, so that she can have Jones to herself
- Mrs Honour Blackmore, Sophia's maid; egotistical and inconstant to her employer
- Dr Blifil, Captain Blifil's brother; dies of a broken heart at his brother's rejection
- Captain John Blifil, a captain in the army and Bridget Allworthy's husband; with Methodist tendencies
- Lawyer Dowling, a lawyer
- Lord Fellamar, a peer and socialite; unsuccessfully conspires with Lady Bellaston to rape Sophia so as to force her into marriage
- Brian Fitzpatrick, an Irishman who abuses his wife, Harriet Fitzpatrick
- Harriet Fitzpatrick, Mrs Western's former ward and Fitzpatrick's wife; a cousin and friend of Sophia, but lacking her virtue
- Miss Jenny Jones (later Mrs Waters), the Partridges' servant, a very intelligent woman who is believed to be Tom's mother
- Mrs Miller, mother of Nancy and Betty Miller
- Miss Betty Miller, pre-adolescent daughter of Mrs Miller
- Miss Nancy Miller (later Nightingale), a good-natured girl who is imposed on by Mr Nightingale and is ruined by him, together with her family, by lack of constancy in virtue
- Mr Nightingale, a young gentleman of leisure; saved from ruining his first true love by Jones's entreaties
- Mr Benjamin "Little Benjamin" Partridge, a teacher, barber, and surgeon, suspected to be Tom Jones's father
- Mrs Partridge, Partridge's extremely ill-natured first wife
- Mr George "Black George" Seagrim, Allworthy and later Western's gamekeeper; a poor man and the object of Tom's charity
- Miss Molly "Moll" Seagrim, Black George's second daughter and Tom Jones's first lover; has an illegitimate son, possibly not by Tom
- Mr Thomas Square, a humanist philosopher and tutor to Tom and Master Blifil; a hypocrite who hates Jones and favors Blifil, but eventually repents
- The Rev. Mr Roger Thwackum, tutor to Tom and Master Blifil, a hypocrite who hates Tom Jones, favors Master Blifil and conspires with the latter against the former
- Miss Western, Squire Western's unmarried sister, who wrongly believes herself to "know the World" (both international and national politics and social mores)
- Mrs Deborah Wilkins, Bridget's servant

== Adaptations and influences ==
- Tom Jones was turned into a 1765 opera by François-André Philidor. While this was initially unsuccessful, a revised libretto in 1766 led to a renewed popularity.
- Another comic opera was written by Edward German in 1907. This opera, simply entitled Tom Jones, starred Hayden Coffin in the title role.
- The book was made into the 1963 film Tom Jones written by John Osborne, directed by Tony Richardson, and starring Albert Finney as Tom. The film was successful and critically acclaimed, winning four Academy Awards including Best Picture.
- In 1964, a studio cast recording of a musical adaptation produced by Theatre Productions Records featured Clive Revill as the narrator, Bob Roman as Tom, and Karen Morrow as Mrs. Waters. The music was composed by Bob Roberts, lyrics by Ruth Batchelor, and it was arranged and conducted by Peter Matz.
- A stage adaptation by Joan Macalpine was written in 1966.
- Stephen Oliver produced an opera based on the book in 1975.
- The musical 1976 film The Bawdy Adventures of Tom Jones featured Trevor Howard as Squire Western and Terry-Thomas as Mr Square.
- Bob Coleman's The Later Adventures of Tom Jones (1985) serves as a sequel to Henry Fielding's original. Set in 1774, it sees Tom Jones become involved with events leading up to the American Revolutionary War.
- A BBC adaptation dramatised by Simon Burke was broadcast in 1997 with Max Beesley in the title role.
- In 2014, Jon Jory adapted the novel for the stage.
- In 2020, it was announced that the book will also be adapted into a jukebox musical called What's New Pussycat? featuring songs by the singer Tom Jones setting the story in the 1960s.
- A TV miniseries from Masterpiece and ITV, starring Solly McLeod, Hannah Waddingham, and Sophie Wilde aired on PBS and ITVX in 2023 to mixed reviews.

== See also ==
- Illegitimacy in fiction

== Bibliography ==
=== Editions ===
- Fielding, Henry Tom Jones (London: Andrew Millar, 1749). The first edition.
- Fielding, Henry "Tom Jones" (New York: The Modern Library, 1931). First Modern Library Edition.
- Fielding, Henry Tom Jones (Wesleyan University Press, 1975) ISBN 978-0-8195-6048-3. Edited by Martin Battestin and Fredson C. Bowers. Widely taken to be the authoritative version.
- Fielding, Henry Tom Jones (New York: W. W. Norton, 1995) ISBN 0393965945. Edited with notes by Sheridan Baker. This edition includes a collection of critical essays; it is based on the fourth and final edition of the novel, though it also includes the version of The Man of the Hill episode found in the 3rd edition in an appendix.
- Fielding, Henry Tom Jones (London: Everyman's Library, 1998) ISBN 978-0-460-87833-3. Edited with an introduction and notes by Douglas Brooks-Davies.
- Fielding, Henry Tom Jones (Harmondsworth: Penguin, 2005) ISBN 978-0-14-043622-8. Edited with an introduction and notes by Tom Keymer and Alice Wakely.
- Fielding, Henry Tom Jones (Harmondsworth: Penguin, 1985). Edited with an introduction and notes by Reginald P. C. Mutter.

=== Critical collections ===
- Compton, Neil (ed.) Henry Fielding: Tom Jones, A Casebook (Basingstoke: Macmillan, 1987) ISBN 0333077393. Includes essays by William Empson, Ian Watt, and Claude Rawson, amongst others.

Monographs

- Battestin, Martin C. The Providence of Wit (Oxford: Oxford University Press, 1970) ISBN 0198120524. Includes a chapter on Tom Jones.
- Ewers, Chris. Mobility in the English Novel from Defoe to Austen (Woodbridge: Boydell and Brewer, 2018) ISBN 978-1787442726. Includes a chapter on Tom Jones.
- Power, Henry. Epic into Novel (Oxford: Oxford University Press, 2015) ISBN 978-0198723875. Includes two chapters on Tom Jones.
- Rogers, Pat The Augustan Vision (London: Methuen, 1978) ISBN 0416709702. Includes a chapter on Fielding, which treats Tom Jones briefly.
- Watt, Ian The Rise of the Novel (London: Pimlico, 2000) ISBN 0712664270. Includes a chapter on Tom Jones, preceded by one titled 'Fielding and the epic theory of the novel'.
