= Haxton (surname) =

Haxton is a surname. Notable people with the surname include:

- Brooks Haxton (born 1950), American poet and translator
- Elaine Haxton (1909–1999), Australian artist
- Fred Haxton (1879–1933), English football player
- Gerald Haxton (1892–1944), long-term secretary and lover of W. Somerset Maugham
- Isaac Haxton (born 1985), American poker player
- Kelly Haxton (born 1982), Canadian football player
- Wick Haxton (born 1949), American nuclear physicist and astrophysicist
