= The Trembling of a Leaf =

1921 collection of short stories by W. Somerset Maugham

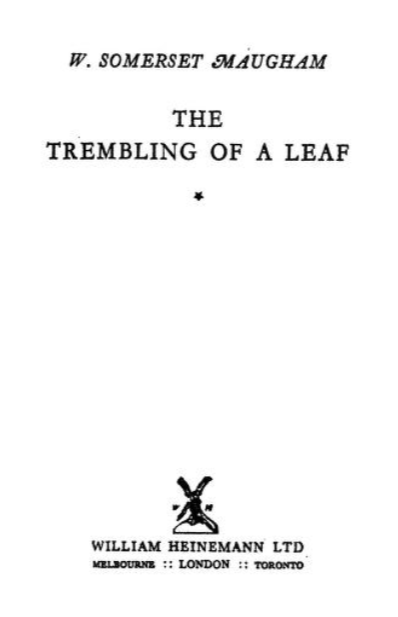
- Title page for The Trembling of a Leaf (1921)
- Author: W. Somerset Maugham
- Language: English
- Genre: Short stories
- Publisher: George H. Doran Company
- Publication date: 1921
- Publication place: United Kingdom

The Trembling of a Leaf: Little Stories of the South Sea Islands is a collection of short stories by W. Somerset Maugham, first published in New York in 1921 by the George H. Doran Company.

The stories are prefaced by a quotation by Charles Augustin Sainte-Beuve: "L'extrême félicité à peine séparée par une feuille tremblante de l'extrême désespoir, n'est-ce pas la vie?" ("Extreme happiness, hardly separated by a trembling leaf from extreme despair: is that not life?")

== Background ==
In 1916–1917 Maugham and his secretary-companion Gerald Haxton travelled in the Pacific, and the stories in this collection are among the writings produced as a result. During the voyage, the ship had to pause at Pago-Pago for a quarantine inspection, and some fellow-passengers who lodged on the island became models for Maugham's story "Rain"; he also met there a young American sailor who was the basis of the title character in "Red". Maugham and Haxton later stayed at a hotel in Apia, on the island of Upolu, where a bank manager became the character Lawson in "The Pool".

== The stories ==
There is an introductory paragraph "The Pacific", describing the feelings inspired by the Pacific, and a final paragraph "Envoi", describing thoughts when leaving Honolulu by ship.

=== "Mackintosh" ===
Walker is the administrator of Talua, one of the Samoan Islands. He is corpulent, coarse, and treats the local people like children or with contempt; Mackintosh, his assistant, who is intellectual and methodical, has grown to hate him. Walker hires local people to build a road for £20; their leader Manuma, who has lived in Upolu and knows what the job is worth, holds out for £100. Walker gets workers from another village to come and do the work, and by Polynesian rules of hospitality the local people must look after them; finally Walker tells them to pay the visitors for building the road. Manuma, who faces ruin, implores Mackintosh to help; he notices a gun on the desk, and Mackintosh, whose hatred of Walker is reaching breaking point, "felt as though something possessed him so that he acted under the compulsion of a foreign will"; he goes out of the office, leaving Manuma with the opportunity to take the gun.

=== "The Fall of Edward Barnard" ===
In Chicago, Bateman Hunter and Edward Barnard both love Isabel Longstaffe, a cultured, intelligent girl. She gets engaged to Edward. After his father's financial ruin and suicide, Edward enters the business of a Chicago merchant with an agency in Tahiti; he will come back to Isabel in a year or two. There is a change in the tone of Edward's letters to Isabel, so Bateman, still friends of them both, visits Tahiti during a business trip. He finds that Edward, sacked from the merchant's business, is working in a trader's store, and is the adopted nephew of Arnold Jackson, known in Chicago as a notorious fraudster who spent seven years in the penitentiary. Edward is happy, saying "I never knew I had a soul until I found it here". He intends to marry Jackson's half-caste daughter. When Isabel learns all this from Bateman, she removes her engagement ring, and happily accepts his proposal of marriage. Bateman looks forward to a successful business career in Chicago.

=== "Red" ===
Neilson, a Swedish former academic, living on a Pacific island for his health, meets a portly, uncivilized American trader, captain of an ageing schooner, who has business on the island. Neilson invites him to his house and tells him the story of a handsome young American, known as Red for his flaming hair, a sailor who has deserted his ship; Red falls in love with a native girl whom he calls Sally, and they live an idyllic life at a creek near where Neilson now lives. One day Red takes some local produce to trade with a ship, and never returns; the ship's captain has kidnapped him to become one of their crew. Sally is grief-stricken. Neilson later meets her, and falls in love. Sally consents to live with him, although she still waits for Red to return. Now, years later, she has become old and dull; when she comes into the room she and the portly American trader, whom Red has now become, do not recognize each other.

=== "The Pool" ===
At the Hotel Metropole in Apia, on Upolu, the narrator meets Lawson, who is often drunk and has grown to dislike the island. The narrator learns his story: coming here from England, on account of his health, to manage a branch of a bank, he gets to know Ethel, a half-caste. They marry, although others think he is making a mistake; they live happily in their bungalow on the island and have a son. Since his health has improved, Lawson finds a post at a bank in Kincardineshire, Scotland, and he and Ethel move there. Ethel becomes unhappy and disappears one day: she is on her way back to Upolu. Lawson follows her there. He lives with her in the crowded bungalow where her Norwegian father and her other relations live. He gets sacked from jobs, and is drunk every week at the hotel; Ethel treats him with contempt. He says to the narrator: "I'm right down at the bottom of the pit". The story ends at the nearby pool where Lawson and Ethel first met.

=== "Honolulu" ===
The narrator is shown round Honolulu by his host, and is introduced to Captain Butler, an American, who tells his story: Trading with his schooner, he visits a native of a Pacific island and, becoming interested in his daughter, offers to pay him for her, which he accepts, and she accompanies Butler on his travels in the schooner. The ship's mate, a native known as Bananas, becomes sullen and it emerges that he has taken a fancy to the girl. Butler, not wanting to fire a good sailor, hits Bananas to end the matter, but afterwards becomes increasingly ill. An American doctor finds nothing wrong, but a native doctor thinks an enemy is praying him to death; he will die before the full moon unless Bananas dies first. The girl brings about Bananas' death, after which Butler recovers: "She knew that if he could be brought to look into a calabash in which was water so that a reflection of him was made, and the reflection were broken by hurtling the water, he would die as though he had been struck by lightning; for the reflection was his soul."

=== "Rain" ===
On the way to Apia in the Pacific, a ship stops at Pago Pago; the passengers include Davidson, who is a missionary, and his wife. Because of an epidemic of measles (a serious disease for local people) on the island, the ship cannot leave until it is sure none of the crew is infected. The Davidsons find lodgings with a trader on the front. For most of their stay there is heavy rain. Also staying there from the ship is Miss Thompson, and from her room is heard the sound of a gramophone and men's voices; they remember she came on board at Honolulu and is presumably from Iwelei, the red-light district there. Davidson is determined to stop her activities, and to make her change her ways is often with Miss Thompson, whom he now familiarly calls Sadie. Her personality changes and she becomes repentant, it appears. A few days later it is found that Davidson has committed suicide, and that Sadie Thompson has scornfully changed back to her former self.

== Adaptations ==
Edward Barnard was adapted for Australian radio in 1940 with Peter Finch.
