= Alan Searle =

Companion of W. Somerset Maugham (1905–1985)

Alan Searle (1905–1985) became the private secretary and companion of W. Somerset Maugham following the death of Gerald Haxton in 1944. He took up residence at Maugham's villa on the Riviera and remained with him until Maugham's death in 1965.

Maugham first met Searle in 1928, when Searle was "a very youthful looking twenty-three, a working class boy from Bermondsey, the son of a Dutch tailor and cockney mother". He was the lover of several famous older men, including Lytton Strachey, who called Searle his "Bronzino boy".

Searle developed an antagonistic relationship with Maugham's daughter, Liza. In his final years, Maugham made an unsuccessful attempt to disinherit his daughter and to adopt Searle as his son.

Following Maugham's death, Searle went into retirement in Monte Carlo. He was interviewed by the scholar Robert Calder when Calder was writing his biography of Maugham. Searle died in 1985.
