= W. Somerset Maugham =

English playwright and author (1874–1965)

William Somerset Maugham CH
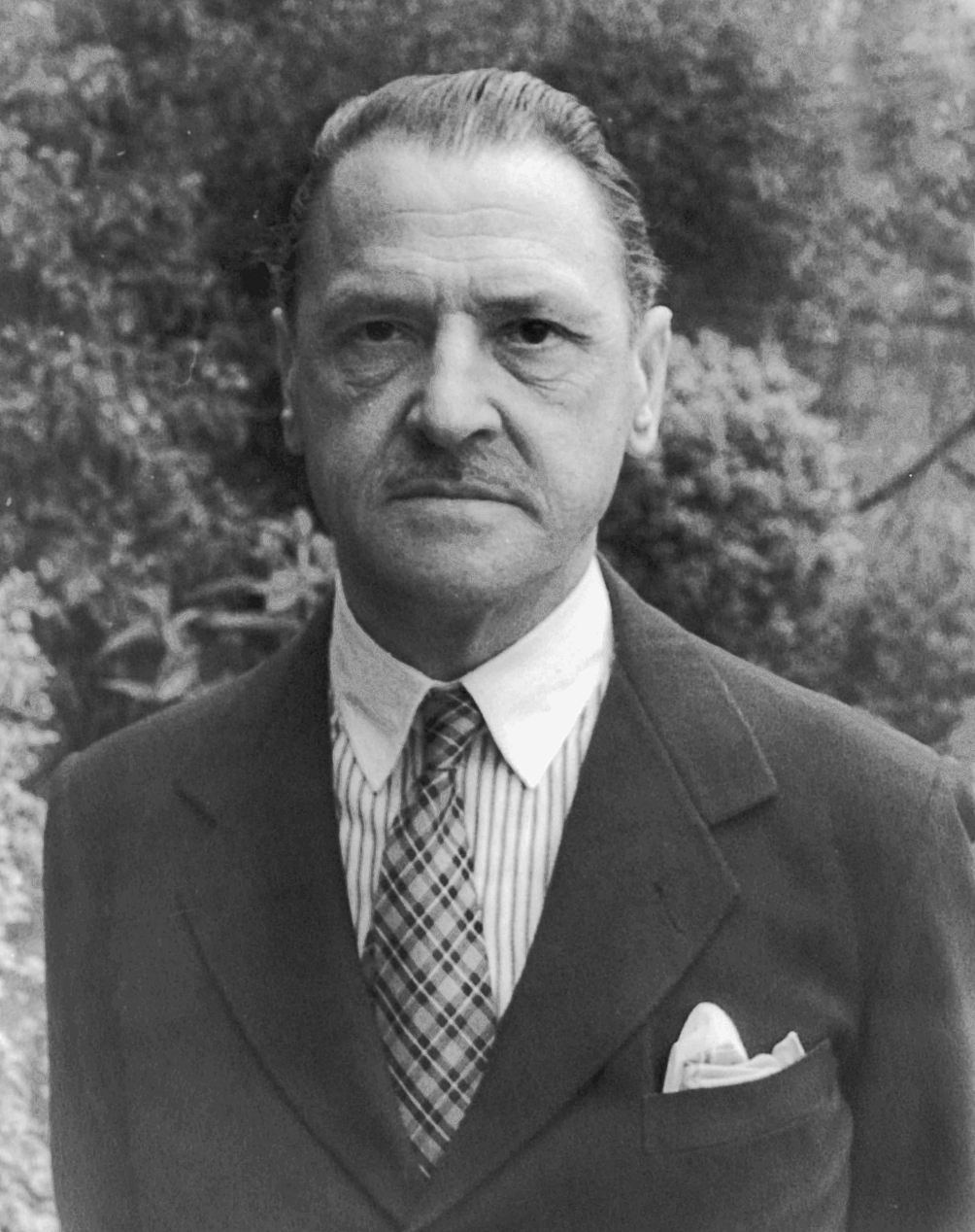
- 1934 portrait
- Born: 25 January 1874; Paris, France
- Died: 16 December 1965 (aged 91) (Note: According to the biographers Ted Morgan (1980) and Jeffrey Meyers (2004), Maugham died on 15 December; Selina Hastings (2010) writes that he died in the early hours of 16 December. The official registration gave the date as 16 December.); Nice, Alpes-Maritimes, France
- Education: Heidelberg University; St Thomas's Hospital Medical School
- Occupations: Playwright, novelist, short-story writer
- Spouse: Syrie Wellcome (m. 1917; div. 1929)
- Children: Mary Elizabeth (Liza) Wellcome
- Writing career
- Years active: 1897–1964

William Somerset Maugham (Note: Maugham usually published his works under the name of W. Somerset Maugham, but in many biographies and studies of him, including those by Selina Hastings, Jeffrey Meyers and Frederic Raphael, he is referred to in the title as Somerset Maugham tout court.) (/mɔːm/ MAWM; 25 January 1874 – 16 December 1965) was an English writer, known for his plays, novels and short stories.

Born in Paris, where he spent his first ten years, Maugham was schooled in England and went to a German university. He became a medical student in London and qualified as a physician in 1897. He never practised medicine, and became a full-time writer.

His first novel, Liza of Lambeth (1897), a study of life in the slums, attracted attention, but it was as a playwright that he first achieved national celebrity. By 1908 he had four plays running at once in the West End of London. He wrote his 32nd and last play in 1933, after which he abandoned the theatre and concentrated on novels and short stories.

Maugham's novels after Liza of Lambeth include Of Human Bondage (1915), The Moon and Sixpence (1919), The Painted Veil (1925), Cakes and Ale (1930) and The Razor's Edge (1944). His short stories were published in collections such as The Casuarina Tree (1926) and The Mixture as Before (1940); many of them have been adapted for radio, cinema and television. His great popularity and prodigious sales provoked adverse reactions from highbrow critics, many of whom sought to belittle him as merely competent. More recent assessments generally rank Of Human Bondage – a book with a large autobiographical element – as a masterpiece, and his short stories are widely held in high critical regard. Maugham's plain prose style became known for its lucidity, but his reliance on clichés attracted adverse critical comment.

During the First World War Maugham worked for the British Secret Service, later drawing on his experiences for stories published in the 1920s. Although primarily homosexual, he attempted to conform to some extent with the norms of his day. After a three-year affair with Syrie Wellcome which produced their daughter, Liza, they married in 1917. The marriage lasted for twelve years, but before, during and after it, Maugham's principal partner was a younger man, Gerald Haxton. Together they made extended visits to Asia, the South Seas and other destinations; Maugham gathered material for his fiction wherever they went. They lived together in the French Riviera, where Maugham entertained lavishly. After Haxton's death in 1944, Alan Searle became Maugham's secretary-companion for the rest of the author's life. Maugham gave up writing novels shortly after the Second World War, and his last years were marred by senility. He died at the age of 91.

== Life and career ==
=== Background and early years ===
William Somerset Maugham came from a family of lawyers. His grandfather, Robert Maugham, was a prominent solicitor and co-founder of the Law Society of England and Wales. Maugham's father, Robert Ormond Maugham, was a prosperous solicitor, based in Paris; his wife, Edith Mary, née Snell, lived most of her life in France, where all the couple's children were born. (Note: Of their seven children, three died in infancy.) Robert Maugham handled the legal affairs of the British Embassy there, as his eldest surviving son, Charles, later did. The second son, Frederic, became a barrister, and had a distinguished legal career in Britain – The Times described him as "a great legal figure" – serving as a Lord of Appeal in Ordinary (1935–1938) and Lord Chancellor (1938–1939). The two younger sons became writers: Henry (1868–1904) wrote poetry, essays and travel books.

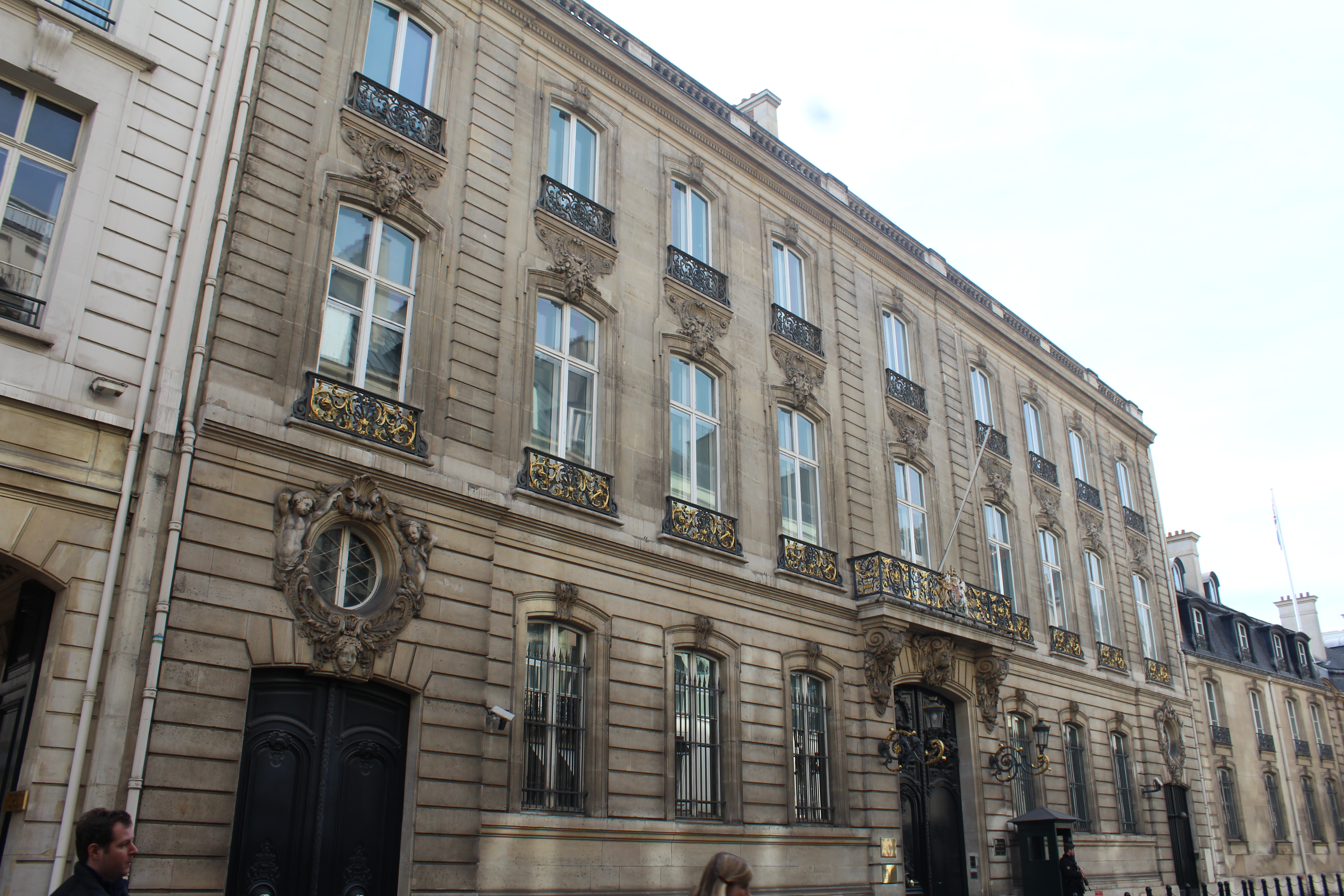
Maugham's birthplace: the British Embassy in Paris

Shortly before the birth of the Maughams' fourth son the government of France proposed a new law under which all boys born on French soil to foreign parents would automatically be French citizens and liable to conscription for military service. The British ambassador, Lord Lyons, had a maternity ward set up within his embassy – which was legally recognised as UK territory – enabling British couples in France to circumvent the new law, and it was there that William Somerset Maugham was born on 25 January 1874. Maugham never greatly liked his middle name – which commemorated a great-uncle named after General Sir Henry Somerset – and was known by family and friends throughout his life as "Willie".

Maugham's mother died of tuberculosis in January 1882, a few days after his eighth birthday. He later said that for him her loss was "a wound that never entirely healed" and even in old age he kept her photograph at his bedside. Two and a half years after his mother's death his father died, and Maugham was sent to England to live with his paternal uncle Henry MacDonald Maugham, the vicar of Whitstable in Kent.

After spending the first ten years of his life in Paris, Maugham found an unwelcome contrast in life at Whitstable, which according to his biographer Ted Morgan "represented social obligation and conformity, the narrow-minded provincialism of nineteenth-century small-town English life". He found his uncle and aunt well-meaning but remote by contrast with the loving warmth of his home in Paris; he became shy and developed a stammer that stayed with him all his life. In a 2004 biography of Maugham, Jeffrey Meyers comments, "His stammer, a psychological and physical handicap, and his gradual awareness of his homosexuality made him furtive and secretive". Maugham's biographer Selina Hastings describes as "the first step in Maugham's loss of faith" his disillusion when the God in whom he had been taught to believe failed to answer his prayers for relief from his troubles. In his teens he became a lifelong non-believer. (Note: Hastings comments that for the young Maugham the hardest thing to accept in abandoning religious faith was "the knowledge that with no expectation of an afterlife he would never see his mother again". Maugham wrote in 1894, "I do not believe in God. I see no need of such an idea. It is incredible to me that there should be an after-life. I find the notion of future punishment outrageous and of future reward extravagant. I am convinced that when I die, I shall cease entirely to live; I shall return to the earth I came from".)

From 1885 to 1890 Maugham attended The King's School, Canterbury, where he was regarded as an outsider and teased for his poor English (French had been his first language), his short stature, his stammer, and his lack of interest in sport. He left as soon as he could, although he later developed an affection for the school, and became a generous benefactor. A modest legacy from his father enabled him to go to Heidelberg University to study. His aunt, who was German, arranged accommodation for him, and aged sixteen he travelled to Germany. For the next year and a half he studied literature, philosophy and German. During his time in Heidelberg he had his first sexual affair; it was with John Ellingham Brooks, an Englishman ten years his senior. Brooks encouraged Maugham's ambitions to be a writer and introduced him to the works of Schopenhauer and Spinoza. Maugham wrote his first book while in Heidelberg, a biography of the composer Giacomo Meyerbeer, but it was not accepted for publication and the author destroyed the manuscript.

After Maugham's return to Britain in 1892, he and his uncle had to decide on his future. He did not wish to follow his brothers to Cambridge University, and his stammer precluded a career in the church or the law even if either had attracted him. His uncle ruled out the civil service, believing that it was no longer a career for gentlemen after reforms requiring applicants to pass an entrance examination. A family friend found Maugham a position in an accountant's office in London, which he endured for a month before resigning. The local physician in Whitstable suggested the medical profession, and Maugham's uncle agreed. Maugham, who had been writing steadily since he was 15, intended to make his career as an author, but he dared not tell his guardian. From 1892 until he qualified in 1897, he studied medicine at St Thomas's Hospital Medical School in Lambeth.

=== Early works ===
Maugham in the early 20th century

In his work as a medical student Maugham met the poorest working-class people: "I was in contact with what I most wanted, life in the raw". In maturity, he recalled the value of his experiences: "I saw how men died. I saw how they bore pain. I saw what hope looked like, fear and relief; I saw the dark lines that despair drew on a face."

Maugham took rooms in Westminster, across the Thames from the hospital. He made himself comfortable there, filled many notebooks with literary ideas, and continued writing nightly, while studying for his medical degree. In 1897 he published his first novel, Liza of Lambeth, a tale of working-class adultery and its consequences. It drew its details from his obstetric duties in South London slums. He wrote near the opening of the novel: "it is impossible always to give the exact unexpurgated words of Liza and the other personages of the story; the reader is therefore entreated with his thoughts to piece out the necessary imperfections of the dialogue".

The book received mixed reviews. The Evening Standard commented that there had not been so powerful a story of slum life since Rudyard Kipling's The Record of Badalia Herodsfoot (1890), and praised the author's "vividness and knowledge ... extraordinary gift of directness and concentration ... His characters have an astounding amount of vitality". The Westminster Gazette praised the writing but deplored the subject matter, and The Times also conceded the author's skill – "Mr Maugham seems to aspire, and not unsuccessfully, to be the Zola of the New Cut" – but thought him "capable of better things [than] this singularly unpleasant novel". The first print run sold out within three weeks and a reprint was quickly arranged. Maugham qualified as a physician the month after the publication of Liza of Lambeth but he immediately abandoned medicine and embarked on his 65-year career as a writer. He later said, "I took to it as a duck takes to water."

Before the publication of his next novel, The Making of a Saint (1898), Maugham travelled to Spain. He found Mediterranean lands much to his liking, for what his biographer Frederic Raphael calls their "douceur de vivre missing under grim English skies". He based himself in Seville, where he grew a moustache, smoked cigars, took lessons in the guitar, and developed a passion for "a young thing with green eyes and a gay smile" (gender carefully unspecified, as Hastings comments).

Lady Frederick, 1907

The Making of a Saint, a historical novel, attracted less attention than Liza of Lambeth and its sales were unremarkable. Maugham continued to write assiduously and within five years he published two more novels and a collection of short stories, and had his first play produced; but a success to match that of his first book eluded him. Between 1903 and 1906 he wrote two more plays, a travel book and two novels, but his next big commercial and critical success did not come until October 1907, when his comedy Lady Frederick opened at the Court Theatre in London. He had written it four years earlier, but numerous managements turned it down until Otho Stuart accepted it and cast the popular Ethel Irving in the title role. It ran for 422 performances at five different West End theatres. By the next year, while the run of Lady Frederick continued, Maugham had three other plays running simultaneously in London.

Shakespeare's ghost broods about Maugham's domination of the London stage (Punch, 1908)

Maugham later said that he made comparatively little money from this unprecedented theatrical achievement, but it made his reputation. Punch printed a cartoon of Shakespeare's ghost looking concerned about the ubiquity of Maugham's plays. Between 1908 and the outbreak of the First World War in 1914, Maugham wrote a further eight plays, but his stage successes did not completely distract him from writing novels. His supernatural thriller The Magician (1908) had a principal character modelled on Aleister Crowley, a well-known occultist. Crowley took offence and wrote a critique of the novel in Vanity Fair, charging Maugham with "varied, shameless and extensive" plagiarism. (Note: Crowley's Vanity Fair review is reprinted in Anthony Curtis and John Whitehead, eds., W. Somerset Maugham The Critical Heritage (Routledge Kegan & Paul, 1987), pp. 44–56.)

Maugham was acutely conscious of the fate of Oscar Wilde, whose arrest and imprisonment took place when Maugham was in his early twenties. Lifelong, Maugham was highly reticent about homosexual encounters, but it was thought by at least two of his lovers that at this period in his life he had recourse to young male prostitutes. Nevertheless he had a wish to marry, which he later greatly regretted. Looking back, he described his early attempts to be heterosexual as the greatest mistake in his life. He told his nephew Robin, "I tried to persuade myself that I was three-quarters normal and that only a quarter of me was queer – whereas really it was the other way round". In 1913 he proposed to the actress Sue Jones, daughter of the playwright Henry Arthur Jones; she declined his offer. In 1914 he began an affair with Syrie Wellcome, whom he had known since 1910. She was married to the pharmaceutical magnate Henry Wellcome, but the couple had formally separated in 1909, after which she had a succession of partners, including the retailer Harry Gordon Selfridge.

=== First World War ===
By 1914 Maugham was famous, with thirteen plays and eight novels completed. Too old to enlist when the First World War broke out, he served in France as a volunteer ambulance driver for the British Red Cross. Among his colleagues was Frederick Gerald Haxton, a young San Franciscan, who became his lover and companion for the next thirty years, but the affair between Maugham and Syrie Wellcome continued.

In the weeks before the war began, Maugham had been completing his novel Of Human Bondage, a Bildungsroman with substantial autobiographical elements. The critic John Sutherland says of it:

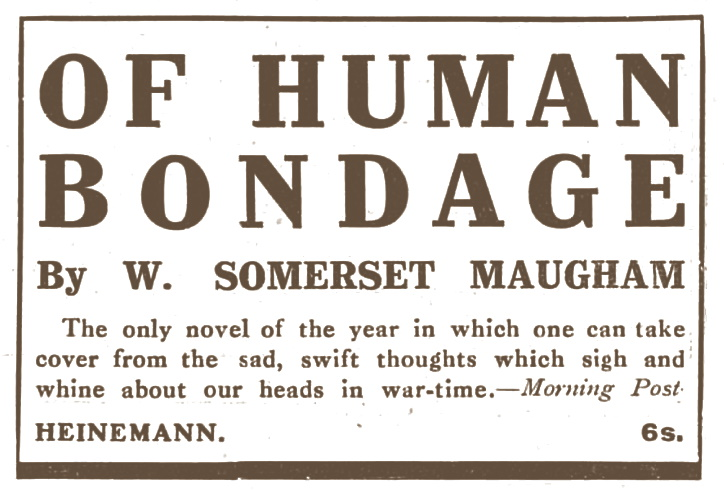
One of the more favourable initial reviews, quoted in Maugham's British publisher's advertisement, August 1915

The hero, Philip Carey, suffers the same childhood misfortunes as Maugham himself: the loss of his mother, the breakup of his family home, and his emotionally straitened upbringing by elderly relatives. In addition, Carey has a club foot, a disability which commentators equate with either Maugham's stammer or his homosexuality.

According to some of Maugham's intimates, the main female character, the manipulative Mildred, was based on "a youth, probably a rent boy, with whom he became infatuated". Raphael comments that there is no firm evidence for this, and Meyers suggests that she is based on Harry Phillips, a young man whom Maugham had taken to Paris as, nominally, his secretary for a prolonged stay in 1905.

Maugham proofread Of Human Bondage at Malo-les-Bains, near Dunkirk, during a lull in his ambulance duties. When the book was published in 1915 some of the initial reviews were favourable but many, both in Britain and in the US, were unenthusiastic. The New York World described the romantic obsession of the protagonist as "the sentimental servitude of a poor fool". The tide of opinion was turned by the influential American novelist and critic Theodore Dreiser, who called Maugham a great artist and the book a work of genius, of the utmost importance, comparable to a Beethoven symphony. Bryan Connon comments in The Oxford Dictionary of National Biography, "After this it seemed that Maugham could not fail, and the public eagerly bought his novels [and] volumes of his carefully crafted short stories".

In 1915 Syrie Wellcome became pregnant, and in September, while Maugham was on leave to be with her, she gave birth to their only child, Mary Elizabeth, known as Liza. The baby was legally the daughter of Henry Wellcome, although he had not seen his wife for many years. He successfully sued for divorce in 1916, citing Maugham as co-respondent. (Note: The decree nisi was granted on the grounds of adultery on 14 February 1916, and the divorce was finalised by the decree absolute issued on 30 August 1916, after which Maugham and Syrie were free to marry.)

=== Secret Service and marriage ===
After the birth of his daughter, Maugham moved to Switzerland. His fluency in French and German was an advantage, and for a year he worked in Geneva – at his own expense – as an agent for the British Secret Service. He was recruited by Sir John Wallinger, a friend of Syrie, portrayed as the spymaster "R" in the Ashenden stories Maugham wrote after the war. Syrie and Liza were with him for part of the year, providing a convincing domestic cover, and his profession as a writer enabled him to travel about and stay in hotels without attracting attention. His covert job, which was in violation of Switzerland's neutrality laws, (Note: A colleague in Lausanne had been imprisoned for two years for breaking Swiss law.) was to coordinate the work of British agents in enemy territory and dispatch their information to London. In his overt capacity as an author he wrote Caroline, a three-act comedy, which opened in February 1916 at the New Theatre, London, with Irene Vanbrugh in the title role.

Maugham at the start of the First World War

In November 1916 Maugham was asked by the intelligence service to go to the South Seas. Samoa was regarded as crucial to Britain's strategic interests, and Maugham's task was to gather information about the island's powerful radio transmitter and the threat from German military and naval forces in the region. He was reunited with Haxton, who joined him as secretary-companion. In addition to his intelligence work, Maugham gathered material for his fiction wherever he went. He was, by his own account, not a particularly imaginative or inventive person, but he studied people and places and used them, sometimes with minimal alteration or disguise, in his stories. He was helped in this by Haxton – extrovert and gregarious in contrast with Maugham's shyness – who became what Morgan terms an "intermediary with the outside world". Maugham wrote of Haxton:

He had an amiability of disposition that enabled him in a very short time to make friends with people in ships, clubs, bar-rooms, and hotels, so that through him I was able to get into easy contact with an immense number of persons whom otherwise I should have known only from a distance.

After the South Seas trip Maugham visited the US and was joined by Syrie. In May 1917 they married at a ceremony in New Jersey. He entered the marriage from a sense of duty rather than from personal inclination, and the two quickly began to grow apart. She returned to England and he continued with his work as a secret agent. He was selected by Sir William Wiseman of British Intelligence to go to Russia, where the overthrow of the monarchy threatened to lead to a Russian withdrawal from the war. Maugham's job was to counter German propaganda, and to encourage the moderate republican Russian government under Alexander Kerensky to continue fighting. He arrived in Petrograd in August, too late to influence the outcome: in November, Kerensky was supplanted by Lenin and the Bolsheviks, who took Russia out of the war.

By that time Maugham was ill with tuberculosis. He returned to Britain and spent three months in a sanatorium in Scotland. While there he wrote a farce, Home and Beauty, which was presented at the Playhouse Theatre in August 1919 starring Gladys Cooper and Charles Hawtrey. In the same year Maugham published one of his best-known novels, The Moon and Sixpence, about a respectable stockbroker who rebels against conformity, abandons his wife and children, flees to Tahiti and becomes a painter. It was well received: reviewers called it "extraordinarily powerful and interesting", and "a triumph [that] has given me such pleasure and entertainment as rarely comes my way"; one described it as "an exhibition of the beast in man, done with such perfect art that it is beyond praise".

=== 1920s: travel and divorce ===
Syrie Maugham in her shop, 1921

After the war Maugham had to choose between living in Britain or being with Haxton, because the latter was refused admission to the country. The lifelong ban followed his arrest and trial over a homosexual incident in 1915. He was acquitted, but was nonetheless registered as an "undesirable alien". When in Britain, Maugham lived with his wife at their house in Marylebone, but the couple were temperamentally incompatible, and their relationship grew increasingly fractious. He spent much time travelling with Haxton. They were in Asia together in 1919–20, keeping Maugham away from home for six months.

In late 1920 Maugham and Haxton set out on a trip that lasted more than a year. In the US they spent time in Hollywood, which Maugham despised from the first, but found highly remunerative. They then visited San Francisco and sailed to Honolulu and Australia before the final leg of their voyage, to Singapore and the Malay Peninsula, where they remained for six months. Maugham, as always, observed closely and collected material for his stories wherever they went. His fellow author Cyril Connolly wrote, "there will remain a story-teller's world from Singapore to the Marquesas that is exclusively and forever Maugham". In 1922–23 Maugham's next extended trip was in south and east Asia, with stops at Colombo, Rangoon, Mandalay, Bangkok and Hanoi.

In Maugham's absence his wife found an occupation, becoming a sought-after interior designer. Her concentration on her work briefly lessened the domestic tensions at the couple's house when Maugham was in residence. By 1925, Maugham, learning that his wife was spreading scandal about his private life and had taken lovers of her own, was reconsidering his future. After another long trip to Asia, he agreed with Syrie that they would live separately, she in London and he at Cap Ferrat in the south of France. They divorced in 1929. (Note: Maugham gave his ex-wife a house in the King's Road, fully furnished, a Rolls-Royce and £2,400 a year for her (equivalent to £131,822 in 2025) and £600 for Liza (equivalent to £32,956 in 2025).)

During the 1920s Maugham published one novel (The Painted Veil, (1925)), three books of short stories (The Trembling of a Leaf (1921), The Casuarina Tree (1926) and Ashenden (1928)) and a travel book (On a Chinese Screen, (1922)) but much of his work was for the theatre. He wrote seven plays during the decade: The Unknown (1920), The Circle (1921), East of Suez (1922), The Camel's Back (1923), The Constant Wife (1926), The Letter (1927) and The Sacred Flame (1928). His longest-running play of the decade, and of his whole career, was Our Betters. It was written in 1915 and staged in New York in 1917, for a satisfactory but not unusual 112 performances, but when produced in the West End in 1923 it was played 548 times. (Note: This was Maugham's longest-running original play, but a dramatisation of his short story Rain made by John Colton and Clemence Randolph in 1921 ran on Broadway for 648 performances.)

=== 1930–1940 ===
Hugh Walpole – caricatured as Alroy Kear in Cakes and Ale

In 1930 Maugham published the novel Cakes and Ale, regarded by Connon as the most likely of the author's works to survive. This book, described by Raphael as "an elegant piece of literary malice", is a satire on the literary world and a humorously cynical observation of human mating. There was hostile comment in the press that the central figure seemed to be a tasteless parody of Thomas Hardy, who had died in 1928. Maugham further damaged his own reputation by denying that another character, Alroy Kear – a superficial novelist of more pushy ambition than literary talent – was a caricature of Hugh Walpole. Few believed Maugham's denial and he eventually admitted it was a lie. Hastings quotes a contemporary's view that Kear was Maugham's revenge on Walpole for "a stolen boyfriend, an unrequited love and an old canker of jealousy".

By the early 1930s Maugham had grown tired of the theatre. He told Noël Coward in 1933:

I am done with playwriting. ... I cannot tell you how I loathe the theatre. It is all very well for you, you are author, actor and producer. What you give an audience is all your own; the rest of us have to content ourselves with at the best an approximation of what we see in the mind's eye. After one has got over the glamour of the stage and the excitement, I do not myself think the theatre has much to offer the writer compared with the other mediums in which he has complete independence and need consider no one.

Maugham's thirty-second and last play was Sheppey (1933). It was a departure from his previous style; its moral ambiguity and equivocal ending puzzled the critics and the public. Despite some help from Coward in the drafting and having Ralph Richardson as star and John Gielgud as director, it ran for a modest 83 performances. Maugham later wrote, "I grew conscious that I was no longer in touch with the public that patronises the theatre. This happens in the end to most dramatists, and they are wise to accept the warning. It is high time for them then to retire. I did so with relief." Raphael suggests that Maugham now wished to write to please himself rather than others.

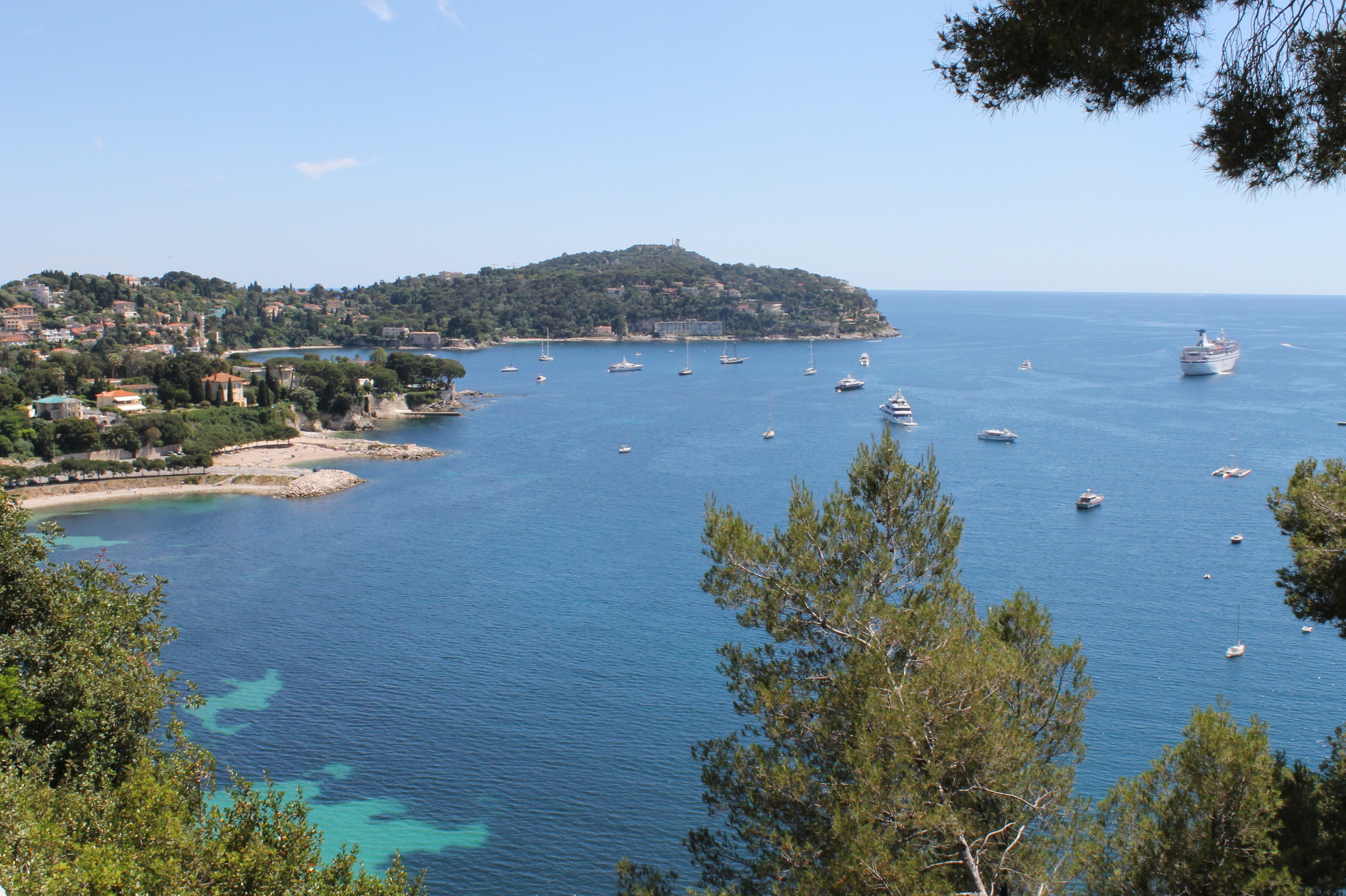
Cap Ferrat, Maugham's home from 1927

Maugham's days of lengthy trips to distant places were mostly behind him, but at Kipling's suggestion he sailed to the West Indies in 1936. The British colonies there failed to provide him with anything like the material he had gathered in the Asian outposts in the 1920s, but the French penal settlement on Devil's Island furnished him with some stories. During a visit to India in 1938 he found his interest prompted less by the British expatriates than by Indian philosophers and ascetics: "As soon as the Maharajas realized that I didn't want to go on tiger hunts but that I was interested in seeing poets and philosophers they were very helpful." He visited the Hindu sage Ramana Maharishi at his ashram, and later used him as the model for the spiritual guru of his 1944 novel The Razor's Edge.

Throughout the decade Maugham, with Haxton in attendance, lived and entertained lavishly at his house on Cap Ferrat, the Villa La Mauresque. His domestic staff there comprised thirteen servants. (Note: Maugham said, "Sometimes it fills me with uneasiness that no less than thirteen persons should spend their lives administering to the comfort of one old party". Robin Maugham records that as late as the 1960s Maugham employed six indoor servants and four gardeners.) When the Second World War began in 1939 he stayed in his home as long as he could, but in June 1940 France surrendered; knowing himself to be proscribed by the Nazis (Joseph Goebbels denounced him personally), Maugham made his way to England in uncomfortable conditions on a coal freighter from Nice. Haxton, as a citizen of neutral America, was not in immediate peril from the Germans and remained at the villa, securing it and its contents as far as possible, before making his way via Lisbon to New York.

=== Second World War ===
Maugham spent most of the war years in the US, based for much of the time at a comfortable house on the estate of his American publisher, Nelson Doubleday. His lifestyle was modest: he felt that despite his considerable wealth he should not live luxuriously while Britain was enduring wartime privations. He saw little of Haxton, who undertook war work in Washington DC. As always, Maugham wrote continually. His daily routine was to write between an early breakfast and lunchtime, after which he entertained himself. His most substantial book from the war years was The Razor's Edge; he found writing it unusually tiring – he was seventy when it was completed – and vowed it would be the last long novel he wrote.

Haxton was holding down a responsible job in Washington and enjoying his new independence and self-reliance. Maugham was happy for him and was reconciled to the possibility of returning to La Mauresque without him after the war. The possibility became a certainty when in November 1944, after a six-month illness initially diagnosed as pleurisy, Haxton died of tuberculosis. Maugham was distraught; he told his nephew, Robin, "You'll never know how great a grief this has been to me. The best years of my life – those we spent wandering about the world – are inextricably connected with him. And in one way or another – however indirectly – all I've written during the last twenty years has something to do with him".

Even before Haxton's mortal illness, Maugham had already chosen a replacement as secretary-companion, in anticipation that Haxton would not return to live at La Mauresque. This was Alan Searle, whom Maugham had known since 1928, when Searle was twenty-three. He came from Bermondsey, a poor district of London. Morgan describes him:

... the son of a tailor, he dropped his aitches like one of the characters in Liza of Lambeth. He had already been taken up by older homosexuals, including Lytton Strachey, who called him "my Bronzino boy".

Maugham's biographers have differed considerably about Searle's character and his influence for better or worse on his employer. Connon writes, "He was seen by some as a near saint and by others, particularly the Maugham family, as a villain"; Hastings labels him "a podgy Iago ... constantly briefing against [Syrie and Liza]", and quotes Alan Pryce-Jones's summary: "an intriguer, a schemer with a keen eye to his own advantage, a troublemaker". Raphael calls him "a man of more reliable stamp" than Haxton; Meyers describes him as "sober, efficient, honest and gentle".

=== Post-war and final years ===
Before returning to the south of France after the war, Maugham travelled to England and lived in London until the end of 1946. While there, he established and endowed the Somerset Maugham Award, to be administered by the Society of Authors and given annually to a writer under the age of thirty-five for a published work of fiction, non-fiction or poetry; the prize money is to be used for foreign travel. (Note: The judges for the inaugural award were V. S. Pritchett, C. V. Wedgwood and Cecil Day-Lewis. Among winners during Maugham's lifetime were Doris Lessing (1954), Kingsley Amis (1955), Ted Hughes (1960), V. S. Naipaul (1961) and John le Carré (1964).) After returning to Cap Ferrat he completed his last full-length work of fiction, the historical novel Catalina. He took part in the adaptation for the cinema of some of his short stories, Quartet (1948), Trio (1950) and Encore (1951), in all of which he appeared, contributing on-screen introductions. He did the same on American television, introducing the Somerset Maugham Theater series, which a reviewer said enjoyed "tremendous popularity ... and has won for him an audience of millions of enthusiastic fans".

Maugham made many subsequent visits to London, including one for his daughter's second marriage in July 1948, where, in Hastings's words, "with professional ease he acted the part of proud father, managed to be civil to Syrie, and made a creditable speech at the reception at Claridge's afterwards". During a visit in 1954 he was invested as a Member of the Order of the Companions of Honour (CH) by Queen Elizabeth II at a private audience in Buckingham Palace. He was widely understood in literary circles to have turned down a knighthood and to have hankered after the more prestigious and exclusive British honour, the Order of Merit, saying to friends that the CH "means 'Well done, but ...'". (Note: Maugham considered himself a better writer than Thomas Hardy or John Galsworthy, who were among the few earlier novelists to receive the OM.) There is some suggestion that his known homosexuality may have militated against his receiving the higher honour.

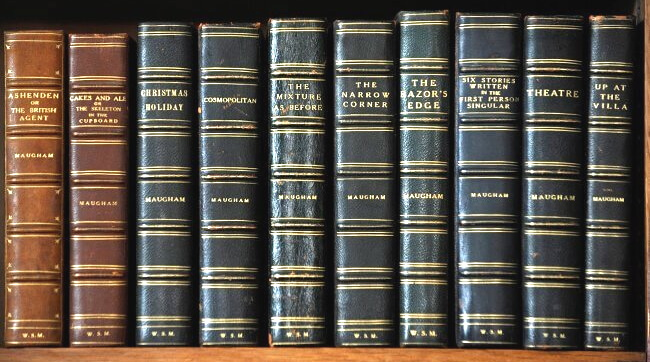
Some of the 5,000 books Maugham gave to the library he endowed at The King's School, Canterbury, in 1961

In the post-war era, Maugham settled into a pattern of life that changed little from year to year:

Winter and spring at the Mauresque, a few weeks of foreign travel (Austria, Italy, Spain) with a stay at a spa (Vichy, Abano, Vevey), an intensely social summer on the Riviera, followed by the autumn in London in his regular suite at the Dorchester Hotel.

In 1959 the foreign travel included a final trip to the far East. He kept himself fit, and further attempted to fend off the encroachments of age with supposedly rejuvenating injections at the clinic of Paul Niehans. Nonetheless, his final years, according to Connon, were marred by "increasing senility", misguided legal disputes and a memoir, published in 1962, Looking Back, in which "he denigrated his late former wife, was dismissive of Haxton, and made a clumsy attempt to deny his homosexuality by claiming he was a red-blooded heterosexual". He attempted to disinherit his daughter and to make Searle his adopted son, but the courts prevented it.

Maugham died in the Anglo-American Hospital in Nice on the night of 15–16 December 1965 at the age of 91, of complications following a fall. (Note: Sources differ (see footnote 1) on whether Maugham died on 15 or 16 December, but it is generally agreed that to circumvent a law requiring autopsies in cases of death in hospital, he was taken by ambulance, shortly before or shortly after his death, to La Mauresque and it was announced that he had died there on 16 December.) He was cremated in Marseille on 20 December. Two days later his ashes were interred in the grounds of The King's School, Canterbury, beside the wall of the Maugham Library, which he had endowed in 1961. Morgan observes:

Maugham, the disbeliever in ecclesiastical ritual, was buried without ritual but on hallowed ground. Canterbury was the shrine of Thomas à Becket, murdered in 1170 in the cathedral, and the destination of Chaucer's storytelling pilgrims. It was a fitting burial place for a teller of tales.

== Works ==
Although most of Maugham's early successes were as a dramatist, it is for his novels and short stories that he has been best known since the 1930s. He was a prolific writer: between 1902 and 1933 he had 32 plays staged, and between 1897 and 1962 he published 19 novels, nine volumes of short stories, and non-fiction books covering travel, reminiscences, essays and extracts from his notebooks. His works sold prodigiously throughout the English-speaking world. His American publishers estimated that four and a half million copies of his books were bought in the US during his lifetime.

Ancient north African symbol, used on the covers of Maugham's books from 1901 onwards. He said it was a sign to ward off the evil eye.

Maugham wrote that he followed no master, and acknowledged none, but he named Guy de Maupassant as an early influence. In the view of Kenneth Funsten in a 1981 study, British writers with whom Maugham has stylistic affinities include Jonathan Swift, William Hazlitt, John Dryden and John Henry Newman – "all practitioners of precise prose". Maugham's literary style was plain and functional; he disclaimed any pretence of being a prose stylist. He was not known as a phrase-maker; the 2014 edition of The Oxford Dictionary of Quotations cites him ten times, compared with nearly a hundred quotations from his contemporary Bernard Shaw. H. E. Bates, praising many of Maugham's attributes as a writer, objected to his frequent reliance on clichéd phrases, and George Lyttelton commented that Maugham "purchases a beautiful lucidity at the cost of numberless clichés", but rated the lucidity second only to that of Shaw. Morgan comments:

In his effort to achieve a casual tone, "like the conversation of a well-bred man", he used colloquialisms that bordered on clichés. He did not use them, like Evelyn Waugh, to reveal character through dialogue, but in the narrator's voice. His characters "got along like a house afire", or "didn't care a row of pins for each other", or exchanged "sardonic grins" and "disparaging glances". A person was "as clever as a bagful of monkeys", the beauty of the heroine "took your breath away", a friend was "a damned good sort", a villain was "an unmitigated scoundrel", a bore "talked your head off", and the hero's heart "beat nineteen to the dozen".

In his 1926 short story "The Creative Impulse" Maugham made fun of self-conscious stylists whose books appealed only to a literary clique: "It was indeed a scandal that so distinguished an author, with an imagination so delicate and a style so exquisite, should remain neglected of the vulgar". After his early writing, in which long sentences are punctuated with semicolons and commas, Maugham came to favour short, direct sentences. In The Spectator the critic J. D. Scott wrote of "The Maugham Effect": "This quality is one of force, of swiftness, of the dramatic leap". Scott thought the style more effective in narrative than in suggestion and nuance.

=== Plays ===
Jack Straw (1908), one of Maugham's most successful comedies: Charles Hawtrey seated and Lottie Venne centre

The biggest theatrical success of Maugham's career was an adaptation by others (Note: The adaptation was by John Colton and Clemence Randolph.) of his short story "Rain", which opened on Broadway in 1921 and ran for 648 performances. The majority of his original plays were comedies, but of his serious dramas East of Suez (1922), The Letter (1927) and The Sacred Flame (1929) ran for more than 200 performances. Among his longest-running comedies were Lady Frederick (1907), Jack Straw (1908), Our Betters (1923) (Note: The play was first presented in New York in 1917, running for 112 performances.) and The Constant Wife (1926), which ran in the West End or on Broadway for 422, 321, 548 and 295 performances respectively. Raphael remarks about Maugham as a playwright, "His wit was sharp but rarely distressing; his plots abounded in amusing situations, his characters were usually drawn from the same class as his audiences and managed at once to satirize and delight their originals".

As in his novels and short stories, Maugham's plots are clear and his dialogue naturalistic. The critic J. C. Trewin writes, "His dialogue, unlike that of many of his contemporaries, is designed to be spoken ... Maugham does not write elaborately visual prose: that is, it does not make a fussy pattern on the page". Trewin quoted with approval Maugham's observation, "Words have weight, sound, and appearance; it is only by considering these that you can write a sentence that is good to look at and good to listen to".

The Circle (1921): E. Holman Clark, Lottie Venne and Allan Aynesworth

Unlike his elder contemporary Shaw, Maugham did not view drama as didactic or moralistic; like his younger contemporary Coward, he wrote plays to entertain, and any moral or social conclusions were at most incidental. Several commentators have characterised him as a pessimist, who did not share Shaw's optimistic belief that art could improve humanity. Christopher Innes has observed that, like Chekhov, Maugham qualified as a doctor, and their medical training gave them "a materialistic determinism that discounted any possibility of changing the human condition". When Maugham's The Circle was revived in the US in 2011, the reviewer in The New York Times wrote that the play had been criticised "for not having anything substantial to say about love, marriage or infidelity. Actually it has extremely complicated things to say about them, but its most important message may be that actions have real consequences, no matter how casually those actions may be taken". Trewin singles out The Circle, calling it one of the great comedies of the 20th century, and comparing it with Congreve's The Way of the World, to the disadvantage of the latter: "He can put Congreve to shame in the task of telling a theatrical story – telling it clearly and without inessentials".

A few of Maugham's plays have been revived occasionally. The Internet Broadway Database in 2022 records three productions since the author's death: The Constant Wife directed by Gielgud and starring Ingrid Bergman in 1975; The Circle, starring Rex Harrison, Stewart Granger and Glynis Johns in 1989–90; and another production of The Constant Wife, with Kate Burton in the title role. In London, the National Theatre has presented two Maugham plays since its inception in 1963: Home and Beauty in 1968 and For Services Rendered in 1979. Other London productions have included The Circle (1976), For Services Rendered (1993), The Constant Wife (2000) and Home and Beauty (2002).

=== Novels ===
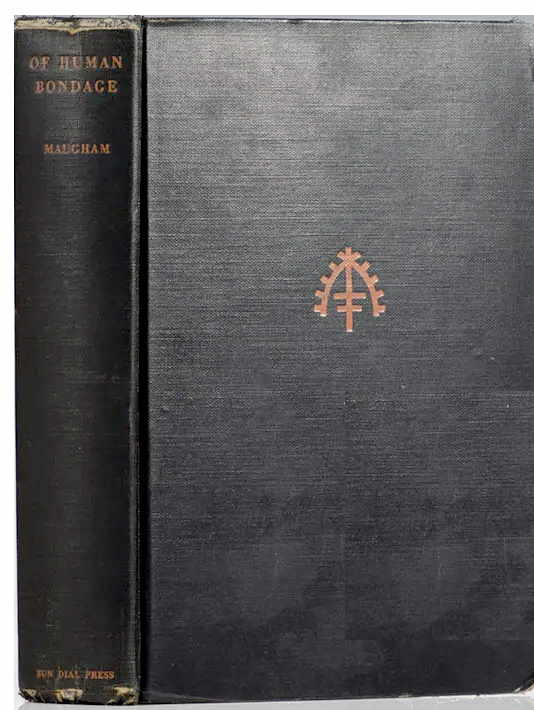
Of Human Bondage, 1915 American edition, with the Maugham symbol on the cover

Maugham published novels in every decade from the 1890s to the 1940s. There are nineteen in all, of which those most often mentioned by critics are Liza of Lambeth, Of Human Bondage, The Painted Veil, Cakes and Ale, The Moon and Sixpence and The Razor's Edge.

Liza of Lambeth caused outrage in some quarters, not only because its heroine sleeps with a married man, but also for its graphic depiction of the deprivation and squalor of the London slums, of which most people from Maugham's social class preferred to remain ignorant. Unlike many of Maugham's later novels it has an unequivocally tragic ending.

Of Human Bondage, influenced by Goethe and Samuel Butler, is a serious, partly autobiographical work, depicting a young man's struggles and emotional turmoil. The hero survives, and by the end of the book he is evidently set for a happy ending. The Painted Veil is a story of marital strife and adultery against the background of a cholera epidemic in Hong Kong. Again, despite the suffering of the main characters, there is a reasonably happy ending for the central figure, Kitty.

Cakes and Ale combines humorous satire on the London literary scene and wry observations about love. Like Of Human Bondage it has a strong female character at its centre, but the two are polar opposites: the malign Mildred in the earlier novel contrasts with the lovable, and much loved, Rosie in Cakes and Ale. Rosie appears to be based on Sue Jones, to whom Maugham had proposed in 1913. He observed, "I am willing enough to agree with common opinion that Of Human Bondage is my best work. It is the kind of book that an author can only write once. After all, he has only one life. But the book I like best is Cakes and Ale. It was an amusing book to write."

The Moon and Sixpence is the story of a man rejecting a conventional lifestyle, family obligations and social responsibility to indulge his ambition to be a painter. The structure of the book is unusual in that the protagonist is already dead before the novel opens, and the narrator attempts to piece together his story, and particularly his final years in Tahitian exile. The Razor's Edge, the author's last major novel, is described by Sutherland as "Maugham's twentieth-century manifesto for human fulfilment", satirising Western materialism and drawing on Eastern spiritualism as a way to find meaning in existence.

=== Short stories ===
Illustrated title of an early (1900) Maugham short story

For many readers and critics, the best of Maugham is in his short stories. Raphael writes that Maugham became widely regarded as the supreme English exponent of the form – "both the magazine squib and the more elaborate conte". Most were first published in weekly or monthly magazines and later collected in book form. The first volume, Orientations, came out in 1898 and his last, Creatures of Circumstance, in 1947, with seven others between the two. Maugham's British and American publishers issued and reissued various, sometimes overlapping, permutations during his lifetime and subsequently.

The stories range from the short sketches of On a Chinese Screen, which he had written during his 1920 travels through China and Hong Kong, to many, mostly serious, short stories dealing with the lives of British and other colonial expatriates in the Pacific Islands and Asia. These often convey the emotional toll that isolation exacts from the characters. Among the best-known examples are "Rain" (1921), charting the moral disintegration of a missionary attempting to convert the sexual sinner Sadie Thompson; "The Letter" (1924), dealing with domestic murder and its implications; "The Book Bag" (1932), a story of the tragic result of an incestuous relationship; and "Flotsam and Jetsam" (1947), set in a rubber plantation in Borneo, where a dreadful shared secret binds a husband and wife to a mutually abhorrent relationship.

Among the short stories set in England, one of the best known is "The Alien Corn" (1931), where a young man rediscovers his Jewish heritage and rejects his family's efforts to distance themselves from Judaism. (Note: Frederic Raphael in his biography of Maugham, comments that although Maugham has sometimes been accused of anti-Semitism, it is not in evidence in this story, which treats the Jewish characters with a sympathy "which is not to be found in more 'important' writers of the period". Morgan and others nevertheless record slighting remarks, as well as complimentary ones, Maugham made elsewhere about Jews.) His aspiration to become a concert pianist ends in failure and suicide. Another English story is "Lord Mountdrago" (1939), depicting the psychological collapse of a pompous cabinet minister.

The polished, detached William Ashenden, the central figure of the eponymous collection of spy stories (1928), is a writer recruited, as Maugham was, into the British Secret Service. His stories – the first in the genre of spy fiction continued by Ian Fleming, John le Carré and many others – are based so closely on Maugham's experiences that it was not until ten years after the war ended that the security services permitted their publication. In the 1928 volume Ashenden features in sixteen stories; two years later he reappeared, in his peacetime role of writer, as the narrator of Cakes and Ale.

Comic stories include "Jane" (1923), about a dowdy widow who reinvents herself as an outrageous and conspicuous society figure, to the consternation of her family; "The Creative Impulse" (1926), in which a domineering authoress is shocked when her mild-mannered husband leaves her and sets up home with their cook; and "The Three Fat Women of Antibes" (1933) in which three middle-aged friends play highly competitive bridge while attempting to slim, until reversals at the bridge table at the hands of an effortlessly slender fourth player provoke them into extravagantly breaking their diets.

=== Adaptations ===
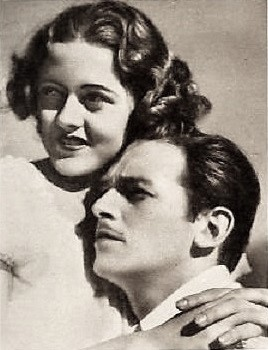
Patricia Ellis and Douglas Fairbanks Jr. in the 1933 film of Maugham's 1932 novel The Narrow Corner

The New York Times commented in 1964:

There are times when one thinks that British television and radio would have to shut up shop if there were not an apparently inexhaustible supply of stories by Maugham to turn into 30-minute plays. One recalls, too, the long list of movies that have been made from his novels – Of Human Bondage, The Moon and Sixpence, The Painted Veil, The Razor's Edge and the rest.

In a study published thirteen years after Maugham's death, Robert L. Calder notes that the writer's works had been made into forty films and hundreds of radio and television plays, and he suggests "it would be fair to say that no other serious writer's work has been so often presented in other media".

In Calder's view Maugham's "ability to tell a fascinating story and his dramatic skill" appealed strongly to the makers of films and radio programmes, but his liberal attitudes, disregard of conventional morality and unsentimental view of humanity led adapters to make his stories "blander, safer, and more narrowly moralistic than he had ever conceived them". Some of his stories were judged too improper for the cinema; Calder cites an adaptation of the historical novel Then and Now which the Hays Office rejected for thirty-seven separate reasons. In the first screen version of Rain (1928) expurgations fundamentally altered the characters; an adaptation of "The Facts of Life" in the 1948 omnibus film Quartet omitted the key plot point that the scheming young woman on whom the young hero turns the tables is a prostitute with whom he has just spent a night; in "The Ant and the Grasshopper" a young adventurer marries not a rich old woman who dies soon afterwards but a rich young one who remains very much alive. Titles were altered to avoid association with stage plays held to be sensational: Rain became Sadie Thompson and The Constant Wife became Charming Sinners.

Radio and television adaptations have, in general, been more faithful to Maugham's original stories. Calder cites BBC Television's series of twenty-six stories shown in 1969 and 1970, adapted by dramatists including Roy Clarke, Simon Gray, Hugh Leonard, Simon Raven and Hugh Whitemore, "presented with scrupulous fidelity to [their] tone, attitude, and thematic intention". On radio, the BBC's connection with Maugham goes back to 1930, when Hermione Gingold and Richard Goolden starred in an adaptation of "Before the Party" from his 1922 volume The Casuarina Tree. Since then BBC radio has broadcast numerous adaptations of his plays, novels and short stories – ranging from one-off presentations to 12-part serialisations – including six productions of The Circle and two adaptations apiece of The Razor's Edge, Of Human Bondage and Cakes and Ale.

== Awards and honours ==
Maugham was appointed Member of the Order of the Companions of Honour in 1954, on the recommendation of the British prime minister, Winston Churchill, and six years later – along with Churchill – he was one of the first five writers to be made a Companion of Literature. (Note: The other three were E. M. Forster, John Masefield and G. M. Trevelyan.) He was a Commandeur of the Legion of Honour, and an honorary doctor of the universities of Oxford and Toulouse. On his eightieth birthday the Garrick Club gave a dinner in his honour: only Dickens, Thackeray and Trollope had been similarly honoured. He was a Fellow of the Royal Society of Literature, a Fellow of the Library of Congress, Washington, an honorary member of the American Academy of Arts and Letters, and an honorary senator of Heidelberg University.

== Reputation ==
The critic Philip Holden wrote in 2006 that Maugham occupies a paradoxical position in twentieth-century British literature. Although he was an important influence on many well-known writers, "Maugham's critical stock has remained low". Maugham outsold, and outlived, contemporaries such as James Joyce, Virginia Woolf and D. H. Lawrence, but, in Holden's view, "he could not match them in terms of stylistic innovation or thematic complexity". Nonetheless, Maugham is recognised as an influence on Coward, Lawrence, Kingsley Amis, Graham Greene, Christopher Isherwood, V. S. Naipaul and George Orwell. His urbane spy, Ashenden, influenced the stories of Raymond Chandler, Ian Fleming, Georges Simenon and John le Carré.

In The Summing Up (1938), Maugham wrote of his non-dramatic work, "I have no illusions about my literary position. There are but two important critics in my own country who have troubled to take me seriously and when clever young men write essays about contemporary fiction they never think of considering me. I do not resent it. It is very natural". Some biographers have doubted Maugham's claim to be unresentful at being overlooked or dismissed by literary critics, but there is little doubt that he was right about it. L. A. G. Strong acknowledged his craftsmanship, but described his writing as having an effect like "that of music expertly played in an expensive restaurant at dinner". Virginia Woolf was friendly though a little patronising; Lytton Strachey disparaged one of his books as "Class II, Division I". Lee Wilson Dodd wrote, "Mr Maugham knows how to plan a story and carry it through. Competence is the word. His style is without a trace of imaginative beauty." In a 2016 survey Don Adams remarks, "The gist of the criticism of Maugham's fiction, that it lacks psychological and emotional profundity, is remarkably consistent throughout the decades."

The "two important critics" Maugham referred to were probably Desmond MacCarthy and Raymond Mortimer; the former particularly praised the short stories, tracing their roots in French naturalism, and the latter reviewed Maugham's books carefully and on the whole favourably in the New Statesman. A rising critic of a younger generation, Cyril Connolly, praised Maugham for his lucidity and called him "the last of the great professional writers", but Connolly's contemporary Edmund Wilson insisted that Maugham was second-rate and "disappointing". (Note: Wilson later admitted that he had not read Of Human Bondage, Cakes and Ale or The Razor's Edge.) Even an admirer such as Evelyn Waugh felt that Maugham's disciplined writing with its "brilliant technical dexterity" was not without disadvantages:

He is never boring or clumsy, he never gives a false impression; he is never shocking; but this very diplomatic polish makes impossible for him any of those sudden transcendent flashes of passion and beauty which less competent novelists occasionally attain.

Maugham himself, although he never used the terms "second rate" or "mediocre" about his work, (Note: In his 1980 biography of Maugham, Ted Morgan mistakenly states that in The Summing Up Maugham wrote, "I know just where I stand – in the very first row of the second-raters". As the later researchers Daniel Blackburn and Alexander Arsov have pointed out, this phrase does not appear in Maugham's book and there is no known evidence that he ever used it anywhere. Nonetheless the phrase has been wrongly attributed to Maugham in press articles, biographies and dictionaries of quotations.) was modest about his status. He said that lacking any great powers of imagination he wrote about what he saw, and that although he could see more than most people could, "the greatest writers can see through a brick wall – my vision is not so penetrating".

Marking Maugham's eightieth birthday The New York Times commented that he had not only outlived his contemporaries including Shaw, Joseph Conrad, H. G. Wells, Henry James, Arnold Bennett and John Galsworthy but was now seen to rank with them in excellence, after years in which his popularity had caused critics to depreciate his work. The tribute continued, "Best sellers that appeal to the mass reader are seldom good literature, but there are exceptions. Of Human Bondage is certainly one; Cakes and Ale probably; The Moon and Sixpence possibly. Some of the short stories will undoubtedly prove immortal". In 2014 Robert McCrum concluded an article about Of Human Bondage – which he said "shows the author's savage honesty and gift for storytelling at their best":

Many would say that his short stories embody his best work, and he remains a substantial figure in the early-20th-century literary landscape. Although Maugham's former reputation has become somewhat eclipsed, Of Human Bondage can still be cited as his masterpiece, a 20th-century English classic with a devoted following.

== Notes, references and sources ==
=== Sources ===
==== Books ====
- Coward, Noël (2007). Barry Day (ed.). The Letters of Noël Coward. London: Methuen. ISBN 978-1-4081-0675-4.
- Curtis, Anthony; John Whitehead (1987). W. Somerset Maugham: The Critical Heritage. London and New York: Routledge and Kegan Paul. ISBN 978-0-415-15925-8.
- Fowler, Wilton B. (1969). British-American Relations, 1917–1918; The Role of Sir William Wiseman. Princeton: Princeton University Press. ISBN 978-1-4008-7650-1.
- Funsten, Kenneth (1981). "W. Somerset Maugham". In Frank N. Magill (ed.). Critical Survey of Short Fiction. Vol. 5. Englewood Cliffs: Salem Press. OCLC 559531006.
- Hastings, Selina (2010) [2009]. The Secret Lives of Somerset Maugham: A Biography. New York: Random House. ISBN 978-0-679-60371-9.
- Innes, Christopher (2002). Modern British Drama: The Twentieth Century. Cambridge and New York: Cambridge University Press. ISBN 978-0-521-01675-9.
- Knowles, Elizabeth, ed. (2014). The Oxford Dictionary of Quotations. Oxford: Oxford University Press. ISBN 978-0-19-966870-0.
- Lyttelton, George; Rupert Hart-Davis (1978). Lyttelton–Hart-Davis Letters. Vol. 1. London: John Murray. ISBN 978-0-7195-3478-2.
- Lyttelton, George; Rupert Hart-Davis (1984). Lyttelton–Hart-Davis Letters. Vol. 6. London: John Murray. ISBN 978-0-7195-4108-7.
- Mander, Raymond; Joe Mitchenson (1955). Theatrical Companion to Maugham. London: Rockliffe. OCLC 1336174067.
- Maugham, Robin (1975) [1966]. Somerset and All the Maughams. London: Penguin. ISBN 978-0-14-003906-1.
- Maugham, W. Somerset (1931). First Person Singular. London: Heinemann. OCLC 702711668.
- Maugham, W. Somerset (1938). The Summing Up. London: Heinemann. OCLC 270829625.
- Maugham, W. Somerset (1950) [1930]. Cakes and Ale. New York: Random House. OCLC 228969568.
- Maugham, W. Somerset (1951) [1897]. Liza of Lambeth. London: Heinemann. OCLC 903861310.
- Maugham, W. Somerset (1952). Collected Plays. Vol. 3. London: Heinemann. OCLC 851722749.
- Maugham, W. Somerset (1954). The Partial View. London: Heinemann. OCLC 1239777338.
- Maugham, W. Somerset (1984) [1915]. A Writer's Notebook. London: Penguin. ISBN 978-0-14-002644-3.
- Meyers, Jeffrey (2004). Somerset Maugham: A Life. New York: Knopf. ISBN 9780375414756. OCLC 754042769.
- Morgan, Ted (1980). Maugham. New York: Simon and Schuster. ISBN 978-0-67-150581-3. OCLC 1036531202.
- Raphael, Frederic (1989). Somerset Maugham. London: Thames and Hudson. OCLC 658161005.
- Richards, Dick (1970). The Wit of Noël Coward. London: Sphere Books. ISBN 978-0-7221-3676-8.
- Rogal, Samuel J. (1997). A William Somerset Maugham Encyclopedia. Westport and London: Greenwood Press. ISBN 978-0-313-29916-2.
- Sternlicht, Sanford (2004). A Reader's Guide to Modern British Drama. Syracuse: Syracuse University Press. ISBN 978-0-8156-3076-0.
- Zaleski, Philip; Carol Zaleski (2006). Prayer: A History. New York: Houghton Mifflin Harcourt. ISBN 978-0-618-77360-2.

==== Journals ====
- Adams, Don (March 2016). "Somerset Maugham's Ethically Earnest Fiction". The Cambridge Quarterly. 45 (1): 42–67. doi:10.1093/camqtly/bfv039. JSTOR 4407495. (subscription required)
- Blackburn, Daniel; Alexander Arsov (January 2016). "W. Somerset Maugham's apocryphal second-rate status: setting the record straight". English Literature in Transition 1880–1920. 59 (2): 139–152. (subscription required)
- Calder, Robert L. (Summer 1978). "Somerset Maugham and the Cinema". Literature/Film Quarterly. 6 (3): 262–273. JSTOR 43796106. (subscription required)
- Jonas, Klaus W. (Winter 1959). "W. Somerset Maugham: An Appreciation". Books Abroad. 33 (1): 20–24. doi:10.2307/40097653. JSTOR 40097653. (subscription required)
- Ross, Woodburn (December 1946). "W. Somerset Maugham: Theme and Variations". College English. 8 (3): 113–122. doi:10.2307/371434. JSTOR 371434. (subscription required)
