= Villa La Mauresque =

Residence of Somerset Maugham in France

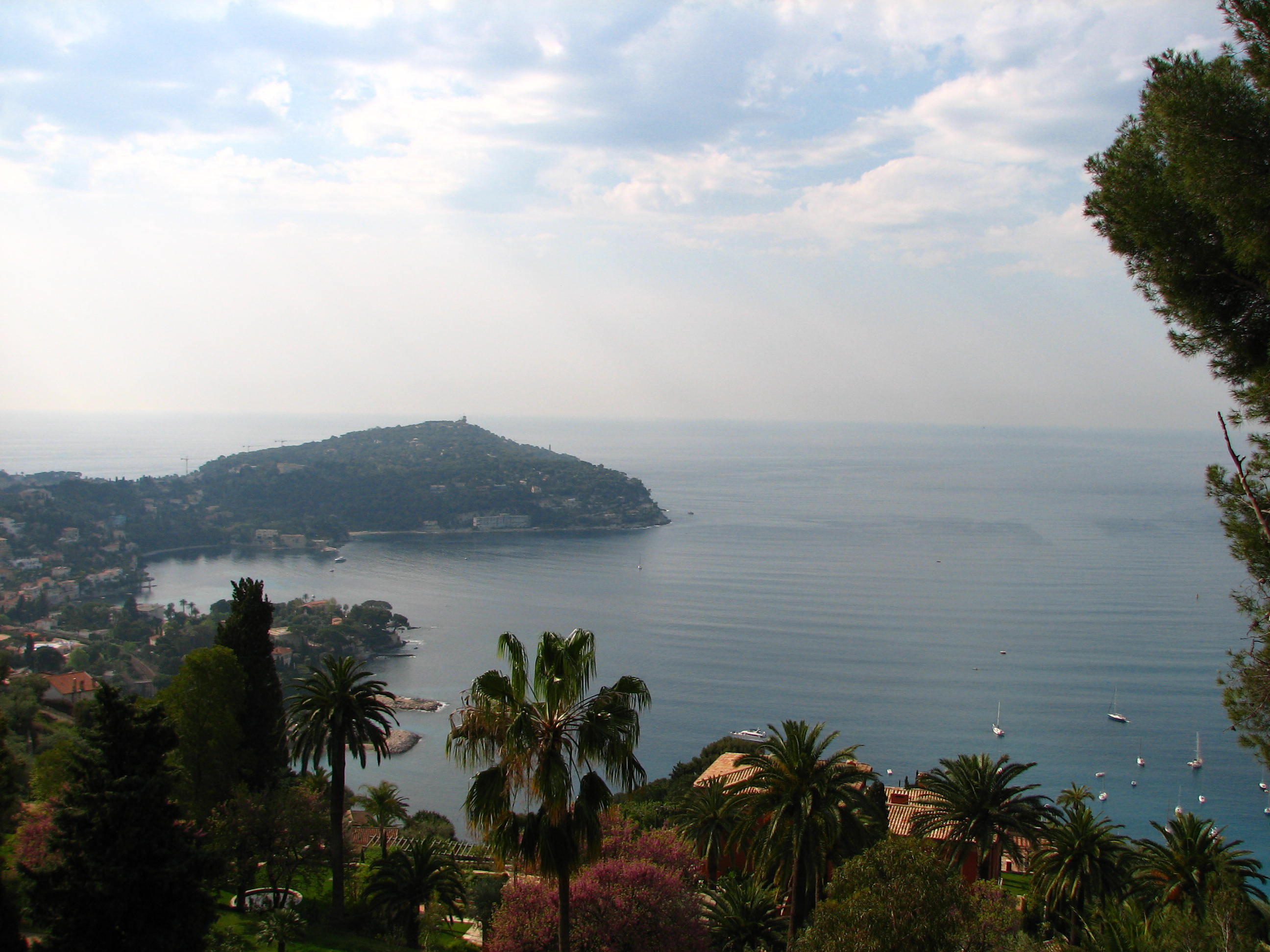
- Panoramic view of cap Ferrat.
- Interactive map of Villa La Mauresque
- Location: Saint-Jean-Cap-Ferrat, Alpes-Maritimes, France
- Coordinates: 43°41′15″N 7°19′45″E
- Designer: Barry Dierks
- Type: Villa
- Completion date: 1927
- Main residence of Somerset Maugham

The villa La Mauresque is located in cap Ferrat (Alpes-Maritimes) and was remodeled in 1927 by Henri Delmotte, Marcel Guilgot, and the American architect Barry Dierks (1899–1960) to serve as the main residence of the British novelist Somerset Maugham.

Surrounded by gardens and terraces, this villa has received numerous writers and celebrities.

== History ==
Around 1900, the former missionary and chaplain to Leopold II, King of the Belgians, Félix Charmettant (1844–1921), purchased a parcel of land (4 hectares (9.9 acres)) on the newly subdivided peninsula of cap Ferrat. Here he had a villa constructed in the Moorish style by an unknown architect.

In 1927, the author Somerset Maugham purchased the property and commissioned Henri Delmotte, Marcel Guilgot, and the young American architect Barry Dierks to eliminate the villa's original neo-oriental elements, to classicize the façades and patio, and to modernize the layout by creating a staircase. Villa La Mauresque became Maugham's main residence until his death in 1965.

Becoming a near-obligatory stop for the literary and Riviera society, La Mauresque, from the point of Maugham's acquisition, received most of the celebrities who visited the Riviera: Winston Churchill, the Duke and Duchess of Windsor, Lord Beaverbrook and the Aga Khan mingled with such literary figures as T. S. Eliot, H. G. Wells, Rudyard Kipling, Ian Fleming, Noël Coward and even Virginia Woolf.

Maugham and his partner Gerald Haxton lived together at the Villa. Haxton was followed by other partners after Haxton's death in 1944. Maugham's last partner, Alan Searle, inherited Maugham's estate and the villa.

In 1967, the villa was purchased by an American, Lynn Wyatt, a prominent figure in international society. The façades and the interior layout were modified – while retaining the classic style – at this time by the French architect Marcel Guilgot.

In 2005, through the Nice registered LM Holdings co-owners David Brown and Robert Shelter-Jones who purchased the Villa La Mauresque and later "ceded friendship" of the property to Firtash, Dmitry Firtash became the owner of Villa La Mauresque for 50 million euros. LM Holdings secured a loan from Austrian bank Raiffeisen Bankengruppe and a $25 million loan in 2005 from Transolve Ltd, which is registered in several places, and another $25 million loan in 2006 from Mersiford Ltd, which is registered in the British Virgin Islands. Then, the Irish firm Moraga Ltd claimed the debt by acquiring the shares of LM Holding with approval from Firtash and his Ukrainian mother Maria Grigorovna Firtash (Ukrainian: Марія Григорівна Фі́рташ).

== Description ==
La Mauresque is arranged around a central patio, on a rectangular plan. Two superimposed galleries, including one that is arcaded and the other on the ground floor, which is glazed, surround this patio. The entry façade is marked by a columnated porte-cochere. A tower marks the southeast corner of the building.

The somber façades, which lack any ornamentation, are of plaster painted white. The roof is tiled, save for the terrace, which is cement.

The interior, on the ground floor, which was modified during the renovation of 1967, included a larger semi-circular foyer (formerly the dining room), living room, kitchen, and service rooms and staff quarters. The tower housed the library. On the first floor, which is served by an elevator, are seven bedrooms and four bathrooms as well as service rooms, laundry and linen room. A staircase leads to the terrace.

== Legal status ==
The villa La Mauresque is a private residence located at 52 boulevard du Général-de-Gaulle, Saint-Jean-Cap-Ferrat at "Le Sémaphore". It has been classified with the Inventaire général du patrimoine culturel since November 2008.

The villa's gardens were the subject of a separate classification, which occurred at the same time as that of the house.
