= Susan Blessing =

American physicist

Susan K. Blessing
- Born: April 10, 1961

Academic background
- Education: BSc, Illinois Institute of Technology 1982; PhD, 1989, Indiana University

Academic work
- Institutions: Florida State University

Susan K. Blessing (born April 10, 1961) is an American physicist who is currently a professor at Florida State University and an elected fellow of the American Physical Society.

== Early life and education ==
Blessing was born on April 10, 1961. She earned her B.S. at Illinois Institute of Technology in 1982 and her Ph.D at Indiana University in 1989. After earning her Ph.D., she was a research associate at Northwestern University from 1989-1993.

== Career ==
Blessing joined Florida State University in 1994 as an Assistant Professor in physics rising to Professor by 2007. She has served as Director of the Women in Math, Science, and Engineering (WIMSE) program since 2005. From 2010-12, she held the Nancy Marcus Professorship. She served as the Chair of the American Physical Society Forum on Education from 2023-2024.

== Research ==
Her academic interest is in particle physics. Her highest cited paper is "Transverse energy distributions within jets in collisions at TeV" at 100 times, according to Google Scholar.

== Awards ==
- George B. Pegram Award from the Southeastern Section of the American Physical Society (2017)
- Fellow of the American Physical Society (2017)

== Publications ==
- Acosta, Darin E.; Blessing, Susan K. (1999). "Leptoquark searches at HERA and the Tevatron". Annual Review of Nuclear and Particle Science. 49 (1). Annual Reviews: 389–434. doi:10.1146/annurev.nucl.49.1.389. ISSN 0163-8998.
- Abachi, S.; Abbott, B.; Abolins, M.; Acharya, B. S.; Adam, I.; et al. (DØ Collaboration) (1995-08-07). "Limits on the Anomalous ZZγ and Zγγ Couplings in pp̅ Collisions at $\sqrt{s}$=1.8 TeV". Physical Review Letters. 75 (6). American Physical Society (APS): 1028–1033. arXiv:hep-ex/9503010. doi:10.1103/physrevlett.75.1028. ISSN 0031-9007.
