= Cap Ferrat =

Cape in Alpes-Maritimes, France

Coordinates: 43°41′15″N 7°19′45″E

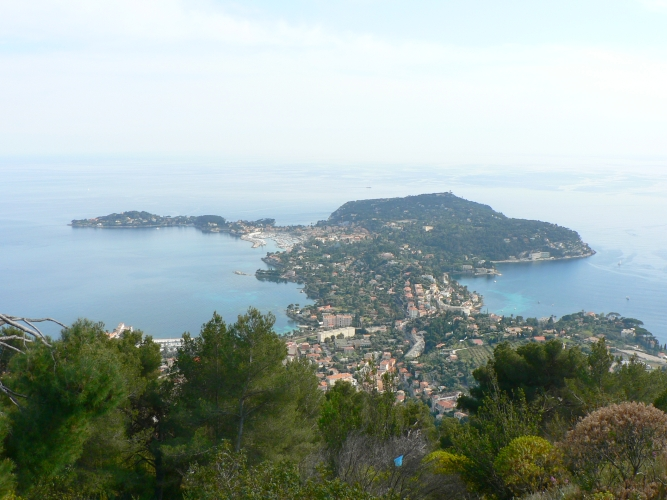
Cap Ferrat viewed from Plateau Saint-Michel

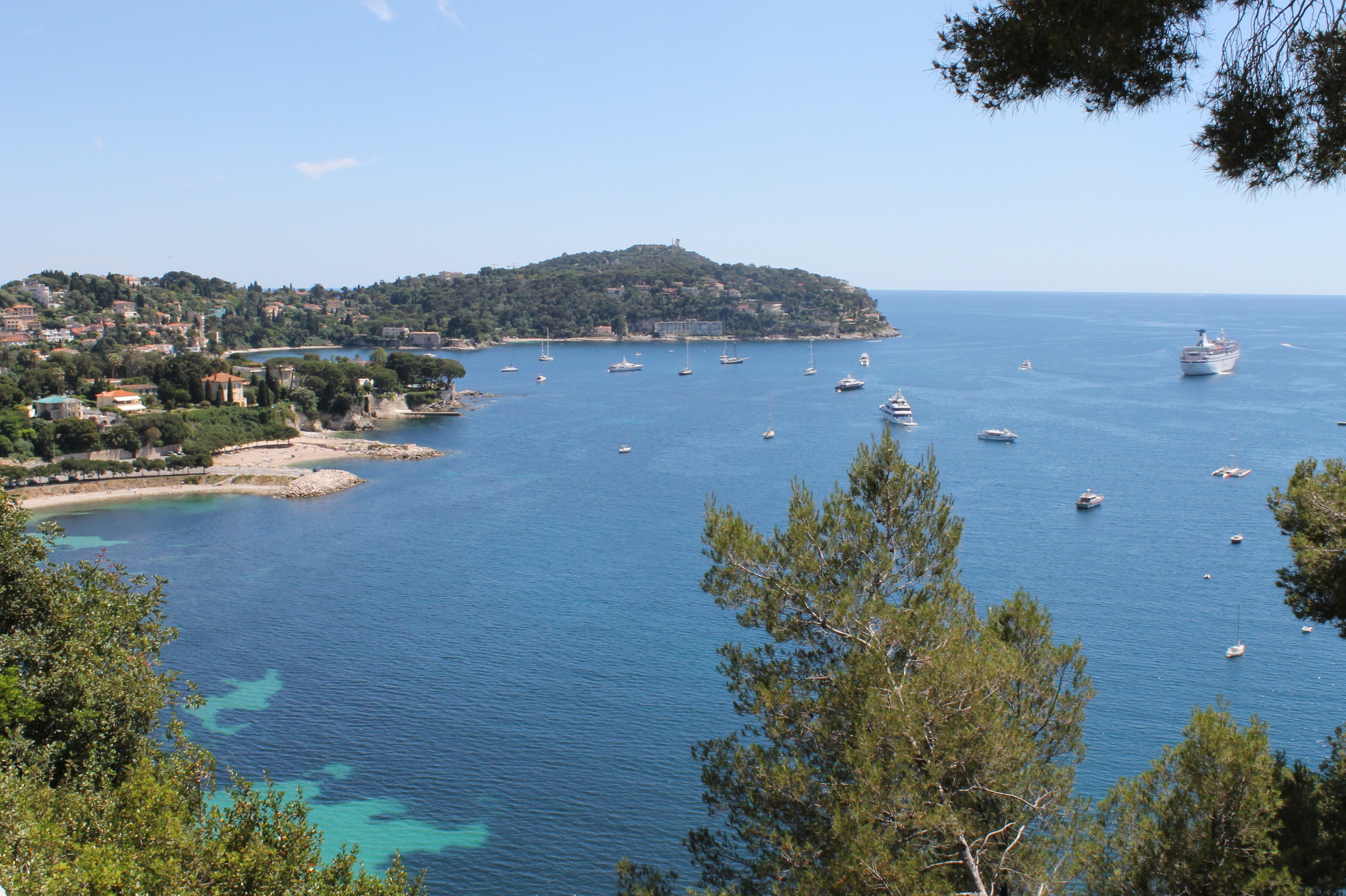
View from Villefranche-sur-Mer to Cap Ferrat

Cap Ferrat (pronounced [kap fɛʁa]; English: Cape Ferrat) is a cape situated in the Alpes-Maritimes department in Southeastern France. It is located in the commune of Saint-Jean-Cap-Ferrat.

Hospitius lived there as a recluse during the 6th century. Thus, the cape is sometimes called Cap-Saint-Hospice or Cap-Saint-Sospis. Once the domain of King Leopold II of Belgium, Cap Ferrat now contains several villas, most notably the Villa Ephrussi de Rothschild.

== Notable properties ==
Notable properties on Cap Ferrat include the Villa La Mauresque (originally built in 1906 for King Leopold II's father-confessor), bought by the English novelist W. Somerset Maugham in 1928, who lived there before and after World War II and until his death in 1965. The Villa Maryland was owned by the co-founder of Microsoft, Paul Allen.

The Grand-Hôtel du Cap-Ferrat was bought by a subsidiary of Leonard Blavatnik's Access Industries in 2007. Prominent former residents have included Paul Hamlyn and Boris Berezovsky.

== Notable residents ==
The English songwriter and playwright Noël Coward referenced the Cap in his song "I Went to a Marvellous Party" from his 1939 revue Set to Music, with the lyric: "Quite for no reason/I'm here for the season/And high as a kite,/Living in error/With Maud at Cap Ferrat/Which couldn't be right..."

Cap Ferrat was named in 2012 as the second most expensive residential location in the world after Monaco, earning the nickname "Billionaires′ Peninsula".
