= Anthony Samuel Curtis =

British writer, lecturer and critic (1926–2014)

- Born: Anthony Samuel Curtis; 12 March 1926
- Died: 29 June 2014 (aged 88)
- Education: Midhurst Grammar School
- Occupation(s): Writer, lecturer, biographer, editor, journalist, literary critic, playwright
- Known for: Work on W. Somerset Maugham, Virginia Woolf, and Henry James

Anthony Samuel Curtis (12 March 1926 – 29 June 2014) was a British writer, lecturer, biographer, editor, journalist, literary critic, and playwright.

== Background ==
Anthony Curtis studied at Midhurst Grammar School, and received a scholarship to study history at Merton College, Oxford. This was interrupted by World War II, and he soon found himself studying war in the Royal Air Force. He later lectured at the Sorbonne (1950–51), after which he became Deputy Editor of The Times Literary Supplement in 1955. He worked at the Sunday Telegraph and was its literary editor from 1960 to 1970. He was also literary editor of the Financial Times from 1970 to 1990.

Curtis was a treasurer for the Royal Literary Fund and the Society of Authors. He became a Fellow of the Royal Society of Arts in 1990, and a Fellow of the Royal Society of Literature in 2009.

He was known for his work on W. Somerset Maugham, Virginia Woolf, and Henry James. He published two biographies of Maugham (The Pattern of Maugham, 1974; Somerset Maugham, 1977), a new introduction to The Razor’s Edge in 1992, and a one-man play titled Mr Maugham at Home (2010). Curtis's book Lit Ed: On Reviewing and Reviewers, a memoir and history of literary newspaper editing, was published in 1998.
