= Robert Calder (writer) =

Canadian writer and professor

Robert Lorin Calder SOM, a Canadian writer and professor, won the Governor General's Award for English-language non-fiction in 1989 for his Willie: The Life of W. Somerset Maugham, a biography based on extensive archival work and interviews with surviving associates of Maugham, in particular Alan Searle. Unlike Ted Morgan, who had obtained permission from Maugham's executors to publish from Maugham's letters in his biography (1980), Calder was refused permission to do so by the Royal Literary Fund and had to rely on paraphrase in referencing Maugham's unpublished correspondence.

He was born in Moose Jaw, Saskatchewan, on April 3, 1941, and grew up in Saskatoon. Calder studied at the University of Saskatchewan and the University of Leeds where he earned a PhD in Literature.

In addition to winning the Governor General's Award, Calder also won a Saskatchewan Book Award for Beware the British Serpent: The Role of British Propaganda in the United States, 1939–1945 (2004).

== Works ==
- W. Somerset Maugham and the Quest for Freedom (1972)
- The Dogs (1976)
- Saskatchewan Roughriders, Rider Pride: The Story of Canada's Best-Loved Football Team (1984)
- Willie: The Life of W. Somerset Maugham (1989)
- A Richer Dust: Family, Memory and the Second World War, (2004)
- Beware the British Serpent: The Role of British Propaganda in the United States, 1939–1945 (2004)
- A Hero For the Americas: The Legend of Gonzalo Guerrero (2017)
