= Alberto Thompson =

Alberto Frederick Thompson
- Born: 1907; Waltham, Massachusetts
- Died: June 18, 1957 (aged 49–50)
- Citizenship: US
- Education: Dartmouth College; Harvard University; LMU Munich
- Scientific career
- Institutions: University of Minnesota; Massachusetts Institute of Technology; United States Army Corps of Engineers; United States Atomic Energy Commission; National Science Foundation

Alberto Frederick Thompson (1907 – June 18, 1957) was an American chemist and nuclear scientist.

== Early life and education ==
Alberto F. Thompson was born in 1907 in Waltham, Massachusetts. He received his undergraduate education at Dartmouth College and received a PhD in organic chemistry at Harvard University. He was granted the Parker Traveling Fellowship while at Harvard, allowing him to pursue post-graduate studies at the Ludwig-Maximilians-Universität München (LMU). while abroad.

== Career ==
After returning from Munich, Thompson became a chemistry teacher, first at the University of Minnesota and then at the Massachusetts Institute of Technology. In 1942, he became a major in the United States Army Corps of Engineers. Initially, his work was in the public health field of sanitation, though in 1944 he was transferred to the Manhattan District, which was responsible for the development of the atomic bomb. In 1945 he was transferred to Oak Ridge National Laboratory, and he became a civilian in 1946. In 1947, he began working at the United States Atomic Energy Commission (AEC) as Chief of the Technical Information Service. While at the AEC, he helped establish the publication Nuclear Science Abstracts, which debuted in 1948. He is also credited with being the main driver for establishing the Annual Review of Nuclear Science in 1952. He became the Head of the Office of Scientific Information at the National Science Foundation in November 1955.

== Personal life and death ==
Thompson had a variety of interests, including model railroading, breeding Siamese cats, growing roses, sailing, writing limericks, the works of Mozart, and fine wine. Thompson died in Washington DC on June 18, 1957.
