= Elizabeth Hope, Baroness Glendevon =

English daughter of Somerset Maugham and Syrie Welcome (1915–1998)

The Right Honourable The Lady Glendevon
- Born: Mary Elizabeth Wellcome; 1 September 1915
- Died: 27 December 1998 (aged 83)
- Other name: Liza Maugham
- Spouses: Lt.-Col. Vincent Paravicini (m. 1936; div. 1948) John Hope, 1st Baron Glendevon (m. 1948; died 1996)
- Children: 4, including: Captain Nicolas Vincent Someret Paravicini; Julian Hope, 2nd Baron Glendevon; Jonathan Hope, 3rd Baron Glendevon
- Parents: W. Somerset Maugham; Syrie Barnardo
- Relatives: Thomas John Barnardo (maternal grandfather)

Mary Elizabeth Hope, Baroness Glendevon (1 September 1915 – 27 December 1998) (née Wellcome, later Maugham, later Paravicini) was the daughter of William Somerset Maugham and Syrie Barnardo Wellcome, and the wife of the 1st Baron Glendevon. Liza, as she was known, came to public attention when she and her father fought a 21-month court case in British and French courts to determine her paternity.

Hope's daughter by her first husband is the Countess Frédéric Chandon de Brailles by marriage. Hope's second son was the 2nd Baron Glendevon and her third son is the current Baron Glendevon. Hope's grandson by her first son is the pianist, Derek Paravicini.

== Early life ==
Born in 1915, Hope was the daughter of English writer W. Somerset Maugham and Syrie Wellcome (née Barnardo).

When Hope was born, her mother, the daughter of Barnardo's founder Thomas John Barnardo, had been married to the British pharmaceuticals magnate Henry Wellcome. They later divorced and Barnardo married Maugham in 1917.

Hope was the couple's only child. She was known as Liza, after her father's first successful novel, Liza of Lambeth.

== Paternity trial ==
In his 1962 memoir Looking Back, Somerset Maugham, who was bisexual, denied paternity of Liza. Around the same time, he attempted to have her disinherited so that he could adopt his male secretary.

Maugham suggested that Liza was the daughter of Syrie Barnardo and Wellcome or Gordon Selfridge or a third, unnamed, lover. The subsequent 21-month court case, fought in British and French courts, determined that Maugham was Liza's biological father, and the author was legally barred from his adoption plans.

Liza was awarded approximately $1,400,000 in damages, consisting of $280,000 in a cash settlement to compensate her for paintings originally willed to her along with royalties for some of Maugham's books and controlling interest in his French villa.

== Personal life ==
=== First marriage ===
On 20 July 1936 at St. Margaret's, Westminster, Liza married Lt. Col. Vincent Rudolph Paravicini. The groom was the son of Charles Paravicini, the Swiss Ambassador to the Court of St. James's. The couple had two children, Nicholas (b. 1937) and Camilla (b. 1941).

- Nicholas's first wife was Mary Ann Parker Bowles, sister of Andrew Parker Bowles, first husband of Queen Camillla. Nicholas's second son and Mary's grandson is the pianist, Derek Paravicini;
- Camilla married Manuel Basil "Bluey" Mavroleon of the famous Greek shipping family in 1963. The couple had two daughters. The couple divorced and Camilla later married Count Frédéric Chandon de Briailles, the Moët et Chandon champagne heir, making her Countess Frédéric Chandon.

=== Second marriage ===
In 1948, following her divorce from Paravicini, Liza married John Hope, 1st Baron Glendevon, with whom she had 2 more children:

- Julian Hope, 2nd Baron Glendevon (1950–2009); and
- Jonathan Charles Hope, 3rd Baron Glendevon (b. 1952).

== See also ==
- Legitimacy (family law)
- Non-paternity event
