= James Beckerley =

American nuclear physicist

James Gwavas Beckerley
- Born: February 27, 1915; Chicago
- Died: April 18, 2006 (aged 91); Wells, Maine
- Citizenship: US
- Education: Stanford University
- Partner: Lucille Beckerley
- Children: 2 sons James and John Denson
- Scientific career
- Fields: nuclear physics
- Institutions: Columbia University; Judson College; United States Atomic Energy Commission; Annual Reviews; International Atomic Energy Agency

James Gwavas Beckerley II (February 27, 1915 – April 18, 2006) was an American nuclear physicist. He graduated with a Bachelor of Arts and a PhD in physics from Stanford University. He taught at Columbia University and Judson College in Burma. He became the director of classification of the United States Atomic Energy Commission in 1949, though resigned in 1954 due to his disagreement about security measures he thought were excessive. He served as editor of several journals, including the Annual Review of Nuclear Science and Nuclear Fusion. Beckerley was also the main editor of the book series The Geneva Series on the Peaceful Uses of Atomic Energy.

== Early life and career ==
James Gwavas Beckerley was born in Chicago on February 27, 1915. His parents were Clara née Ungewitter and Gwavas Foster Beckerley. He had an older brother, William Beckerley. In 1935, he received his A.B. degree from Stanford University. In 1945, he graduated from Stanford with a PhD in physics. He taught physics at Columbia University and Judson College in Burma before it was bombed by Japan in 1942. From 1949–1954, he was the director of classification at the United States Atomic Energy Commission. During his time at the AEC, he testified against the Rosenbergs at their trial for spying. Part of the reason for his resignation in 1954 was due to his disagreement with Chairman Lewis Strauss. He felt Strauss was too conservative with security measures, and believed that it was time to relax some policies. He said the US acted as if it was in denial about the capabilities of the Soviets, saying in March 1953 "It is time to stop kidding ourselves that we're just better than the USSR. The Russians have the skills and the plants to make fission materials and bombs."

He was the first editor of the peer-reviewed journal the Annual Review of Nuclear Science. He held the position for six years from 1952 to 1958, at which time he was succeeded by Emilio Segrè. He was associated with the International Atomic Energy Agency from 1959–1962. During this time, he created and was the first editor of the journal Nuclear Fusion. By 1969, he was the president of a company called Radioptrics, Inc. He also worked as a consultant for NASA on its planetology subcommittee. In the 1970s, he worked at the US Nuclear Regulatory Commission where he helped develop heavy water for use in nuclear reactors.

He was coauthor and coeditor of the two-volume publication, The Technology of Nuclear Reactor Safety, which was called the "standard reference work" by the Joint Committee on Atomic Energy.

== Personal life and death ==
Beckerley married Lucille; together, they had at least one son, James. Beckerley died in Wells, Maine on April 18, 2006.
