= Syrie Maugham =

British interior decorator (1879–1955)

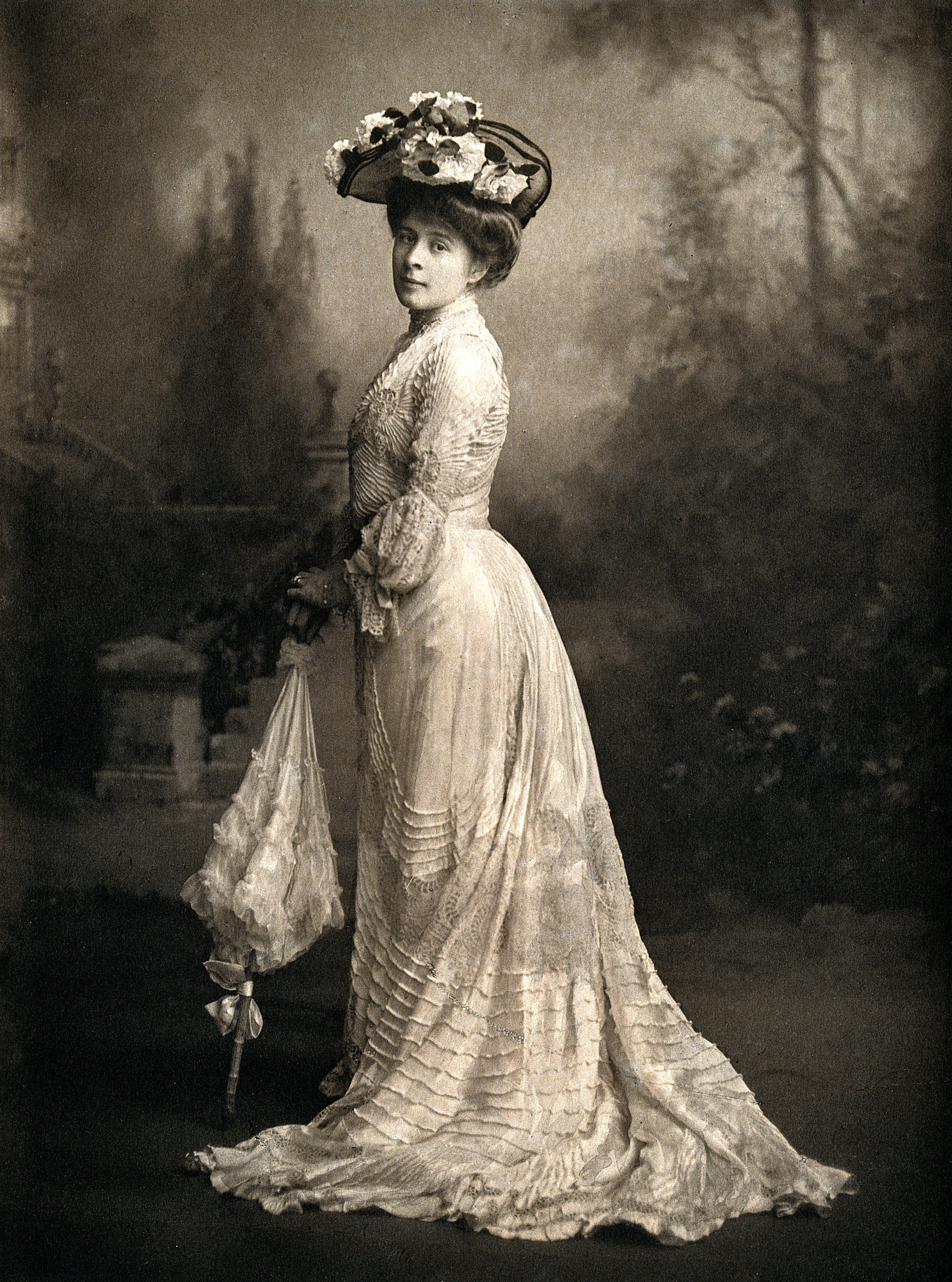
- Gwendoline Maud Syrie Wellcome (née Barnardo). Photo from 1901.
- Born: Gwendoline Maud Syrie Barnardo; 10 July 1879; England
- Died: 25 July 1955 (aged 76)
- Occupation: Interior designer
- Spouses: Henry Wellcome (m. 1901; div. 1915) W. Somerset Maugham (m. 1917; div. 1929)
- Children: Henry Mounteney Wellcome; Elizabeth Hope, Baroness Glendevon
- Parents: Thomas John Barnardo; Sarah Louise Elmslie

Gwendoline Maud Syrie Maugham (née Barnardo, formerly Wellcome; 10 July 1879 – 25 July 1955) was a leading British interior decorator of the 1920s and 1930s who popularised rooms decorated entirely in white.

== Early life ==
Gwendoline Maud Syrie Barnardo was born in England on 10 July 1879. She was the daughter of Thomas John Barnardo, the founder of the Barnardo's charity for destitute children, and his wife, Sarah Louise "Syrie" Elmslie. Gwendoline was the eldest girl in a family of six. As an adult, she preferred to be known by her last christian name (Syrie).

Syrie's Irish-born father had converted at age 16 to Protestant evangelicalism, joining the Plymouth Brethren, and believed in daily Bible reading, obedience, strict punctuality and the forgoing of worldly pleasures including drinking (alcohol), smoking and visiting the theatre. A columnist later claimed that this strict upbringing was ‘a good example that one’s strongest motives in life are reactions from youth’ when discussing Syrie Maugham. By the age of 16, she was engaged, encouraged by her mother to find a suitable marriage. Syrie broke it off when she discovered her fiancé had a mistress, and in 1901 travelled to Egypt instead.

== Career ==
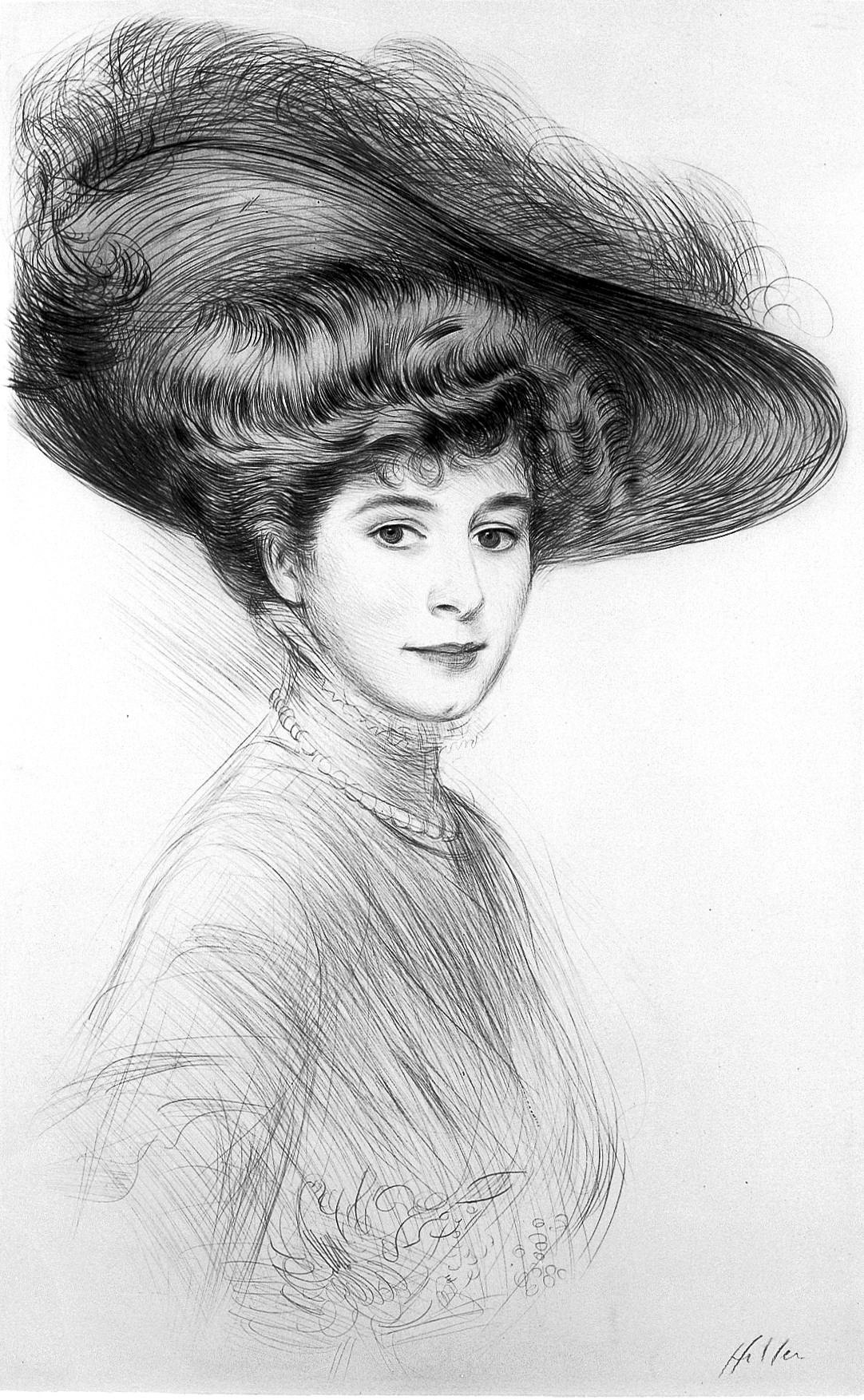
Drypoint by Paul César Helleu

In the 1910s, Maugham began her interior design career as an apprentice under Ernest Thornton-Smith for a London decorating firm, learning there about the intricacies of furniture restoration, trompe-l'œil, curtain design, and the mechanics of traditional upholstery. In 1922 at the age of 42, Maugham borrowed £400 and opened her own interior decorating business at 85 Baker Street, London. As the shop flourished, Maugham began decorating, taking on projects in Palm Beach and California. By 1930, she had shops in London, Chicago, and New York.

Maugham is most notable for the all-white music room at her house at 213 King's Road in London. For the grand unveiling of her all-white room, Maugham went to the extreme of dipping her white canvas draperies in cement. The room was filled with massive white floral arrangements and the overall effect was stunning. Although she was known for white rooms, her own drawing room was the only all-white room she ever did.

Also well-known was Maugham's salon in her villa at Le Touquet, a society resort in northern France. The salon was decorated entirely in shades of beige, relieved only by pale pink satin curtains.

Although she made her fortune and fame with her white décors, by the mid-1930s she had largely given up the white décors to create interiors with baroque accessories and colour schemes punctuated by bright green, shocking pink, and bold reds. Cecil Beaton remembered leaf-emerald wallpaper, magenta cushions, and Schiaparelli pink. In this period Maugham worked with Edward James and Salvador Dalí on the decoration of James' Monkton House in Sussex, creating what has been described as "the only complete Surrealist house ever created in Britain."

Maugham charged high prices and could be very dictatorial with her clients and employees. She once told a hesitant client, "If you don't have ten thousand dollars to spend, I don't want to waste my time."

Maugham popularised mirrored screens, indirect lighting, and plump furniture upholstered in white. She preferred wood furniture to be pickled or stripped, painted, or finished with a secret craquelure technique.

Maugham's glamorous rooms influenced almost every designer, particularly Elsie de Wolfe, Jean-Michel Frank, and Frances Elkins.

After Maugham closed her New York shop in 1932, someone suggested that Rose Cumming fill the gap and design white furniture of her own. "No," Cumming said, "white was always Syrie's."

Maugham's daughter Liza married in 1936, and Maugham decorated her London house. After finishing it, she sold her own house and travelled to India with Elsie de Wolfe "to paint the Black Hole of Calcutta white". Maugham continued decorating, but had already completed her most famous and successful work. Her clients included Wallis Simpson, Marie Tempest, Oveta Culp Hobby, DeWitt Wallace, Elsa Schiaparelli, Capt. Edward Molyneux, Edward James, Mona Williams, Babe Paley, Bunny Mellon, Clare Boothe Luce, Alfred Lunt/Lynn Fontanne, Margaret Campbell, Duchess of Argyll and the Hon. Stephen Tennant. She redecorated The Glen, Scottish home of Christopher Tennant, 2nd Baron Glenconner, who hated the existing Scottish Baronial style of the house.

== Marriage to Henry Wellcome ==
In 1901, on a visit to Khartoum with her father, she met Henry Wellcome, an American-born British industrialist who had made his fortune in pharmaceuticals (his firm became Burroughs Wellcome). She was 22 and he was 48, and they married soon after. In 1903 they had a son, Henry Mounteney Wellcome. The Wellcomes' marriage was not happy, and Syrie reportedly had numerous affairs, including with the department store magnate Harry Gordon Selfridge, Brig. Gen. Percy Desmond Fitzgerald, and the bisexual novelist William Somerset Maugham. Eventually, after some years of separation, she became pregnant with Maugham's only child, Mary Elizabeth, who was known as Liza. When the child was born in Rome, Italy, in 1915, she was given Wellcome's surname. Wellcome then publicly sued for divorce, naming Maugham as co-respondent.

== Marriage to W. Somerset Maugham ==
Syrie Wellcome and W. Somerset Maugham married in 1917 in New Jersey, although he was predominantly homosexual and would spend much of his marriage apart from his wife. They divorced in 1929. Her divorce settlement from Maugham was their house at 213 King's Road, Chelsea, fully furnished, a Rolls-Royce, and 2,400 pounds a year for her and 600 pounds a year for Liza. Syrie Maugham died in 1955.

In his 1962 memoir Looking Back, Maugham virulently criticised his former wife, which caused a public outcry. After Maugham's death in 1965, Beverley Nichols wrote in rebuttal a defence of her called A Case of Human Bondage (1966).

== See also ==
- Interior designer
