= Christopher Innes =

Canadian historian (1941–2017)

Christopher Innes (1941 – 19 June 2017) was a Canadian historian of English Arts, a Canada Research Chair and Distinguished Research Professor at York University. He was a Fellow of the Royal Society of Canada, as well as a Fellow of the Royal Society of the Arts and a Killam Fellow.
