= Annual Review of Nuclear and Particle Science =

- Discipline: Nuclear physics Particle physics
- Language: English
- Edited by: Wick C. Haxton, Michael E. Peskin

Publication details
- Former name: Annual Review of Nuclear Science
- History: 1952–present
- Publisher: Annual Reviews (United States)
- Frequency: Annual
- Open access: Subscribe to Open
- License: Creative Commons
- Impact factor: 8.8 (2025)

Standard abbreviations
- ISO 4: Annu. Rev. Nucl. Part. Sci.
- MathSciNet: Ann. Rev. Nuclear Particle Sci.

Indexing
- CODEN: ARPSDF
- ISSN: 0163-8998 (print); 1545-4134 (web)
- LCCN: 79640199
- OCLC no.: 784233404

Links
- Journal homepage

The Annual Review of Nuclear and Particle Science is a peer-reviewed academic journal that publishes articles reviewing the literature of the subject matter once a year. As of 2026, Journal Citation Reports lists the journal's 2025 impact factor as 8.8, ranking it second of 22 journal titles in the category "Physics, Nuclear" and third of 31 journal titles in the category "Physics, Particles and Fields". Beginning in 2020, the Annual Review of Nuclear and Particle Science is published open access under the Subscribe to Open (S2O) publishing model.

The journal was first created in 1952 through a partnership between the National Research Council's Committee on Nuclear Science and Annual Reviews (AR). The initial title of the journal was Annual Review of Nuclear Science. AR published all volumes independently beginning with Volume 3. In 1978, the journal's name was changed to Annual Review of Nuclear and Particle Science. In its history, it has had eight editors, four of whom had tenures of 10 or more years: Emilio Segrè, John David Jackson, Chris Quigg, and Barry R. Holstein.

== History ==
In the early 1950s, the National Research Council's Committee on Nuclear Science announced its support for an annual volume of review articles that covered recent developments in the field of nuclear science. One of the key proponents of creating the journal was Alberto F. Thompson, who had previously helped establish Nuclear Science Abstracts in 1948. The Committee on Nuclear Science consulted Annual Reviews (AR), a nonprofit organization whose stated mission is to synthesize knowledge "for the progress of science and the benefit of society." AR agreed to publish the initial and subsequent volumes. Members of the Committee acted as the editorial board for the first volume, which was published in December 1952. Published under the title Annual Review of Nuclear Science, it covered nuclear science developments in 1950. Beginning with Volume 2, James G. Beckerley was editor, with Martin D. Kamen, Donald F. Mastick, and Leonard I. Schiff as associate editors. From Volume 3 onward, AR assumed all responsibility for the journal from the National Research Council.

In 1978, the journal's name was changed to the Annual Review of Nuclear and Particle Science. This name was judged to be more reflective of the journal's content, which also included particle physics. Under AR's Subscribe to Open publishing model, it was announced that the 2020 volume of Annual Review of Nuclear and Particle Science would be published open access, a first for the journal. As of 2020, it was published both in print and electronically.

== Editorial processes ==
The Annual Review of Nuclear and Particle Science is helmed by the editor. The editor is assisted by the editorial committee, which includes associate editors, regular members, and occasionally guest editors. Guest members participate at the invitation of the editor, and serve terms of one year. All other members of the editorial committee are appointed by the AR board of directors and serve five-year terms. The editorial committee determines which topics should be included in each volume and solicits reviews from qualified authors. Unsolicited manuscripts are not accepted. Peer review of accepted manuscripts is undertaken by the editorial committee.

=== Editors of volumes ===
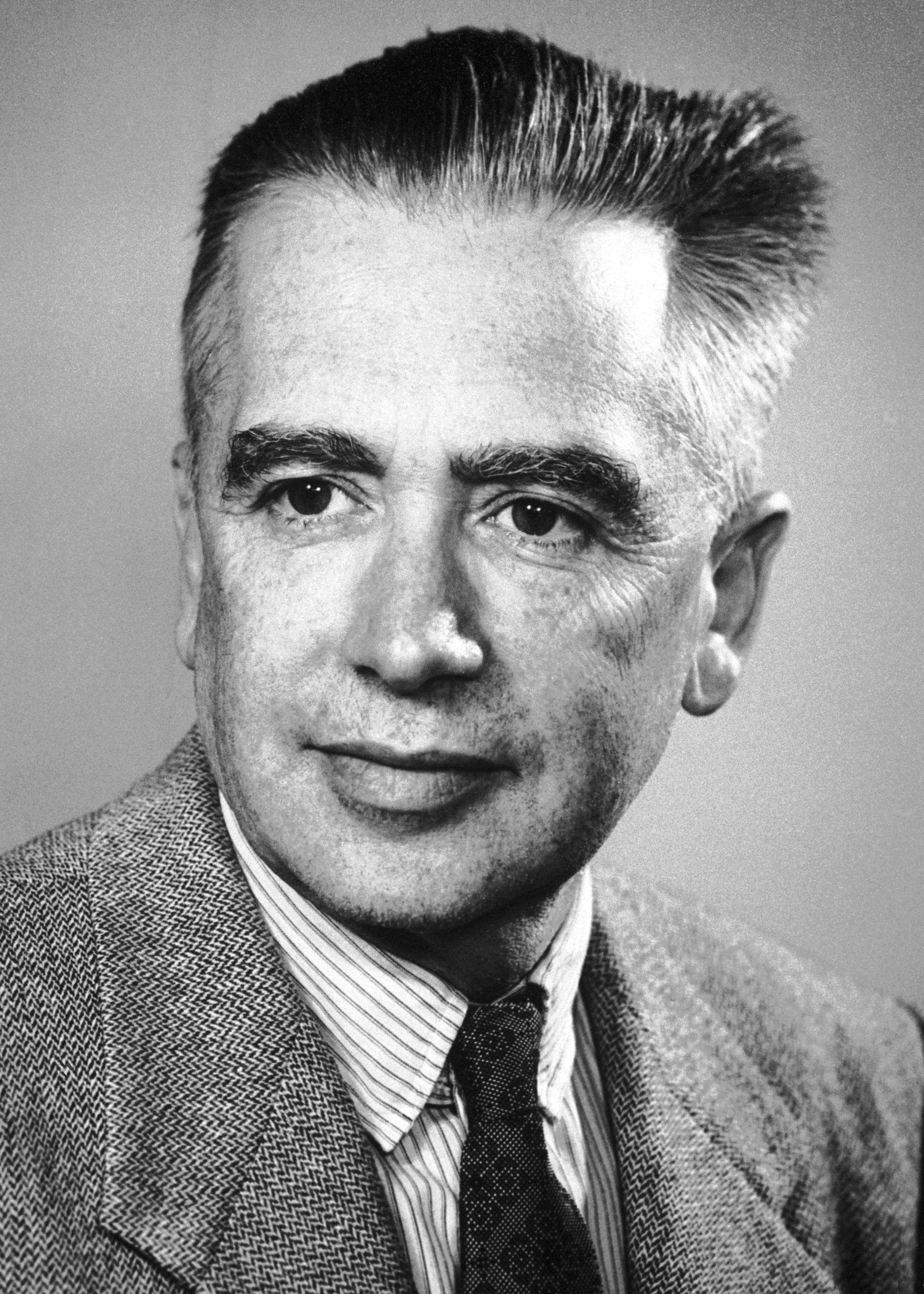
Nobel laureate Emilio Segrè served as editor for twenty years.

Dates indicate publication years in which someone was credited as a lead editor or co-editor of a journal volume. The planning process for a volume begins well before the volume appears, so appointment to the position of lead editor generally occurred prior to the first year shown here. An editor who has retired or died may be credited as a lead editor of a volume that they helped to plan, even if it is published after their retirement or death.

- James G. Beckerley 1953–1957
- Emilio Segrè 1958–1977
- John David Jackson 1978–1993
- Chris Quigg 1994–2004
- Boris Kayser Appointed 2004, credited 2005–2010
- Barry R. Holstein Appointed 2009, credited 2011–2023
- Wick C. Haxton, Michael E. Peskin Appointed 2023.
