= Wick Haxton =

American theoretical nuclear physicist and astrophysicist

- Education: Stanford University, University of California, Santa Cruz
- Employers: University of California, Berkeley; University of Washington
- Awards: Guggenheim Fellowship (physics, 2000); Hans A. Bethe Prize (2004); Fellow of the American Physical Society (1987); Humboldt Research Fellowship; Fellow of the American Association for the Advancement of Science (1988)

Wick Christopher Haxton (born August 21, 1949, in Santa Cruz, California) is an American theoretical nuclear physicist and astrophysicist. He is a professor of physics at the University of California, Berkeley and senior faculty scientist at Lawrence Berkeley National Laboratory. He was appointed a co-editor of the journal Annual Review of Nuclear and Particle Science as of 2023. In 2024, he was elected to the American Philosophical Society.

== Education ==
Haxton grew up in Santa Cruz, studied from 1967 at the University of California, Santa Cruz (BA in physics and mathematics 1971) and received his doctorate in 1976 at Stanford University for his work on Semileptonic Weak Interactions in Complex Nuclei (1975).

== Career ==
From 1975 to 1977 he worked at the Institute for Nuclear Physics of the University of Mainz and then until 1985 as Oppenheimer Fellow in the theoretical division of the Los Alamos National Laboratory. After a year as assistant professor at Purdue University in 1984 he became associate professor and in 1987 professor at the University of Washington. He remained there as professor of physics and astronomy until 2009, serving from 1991 to 2006 as director of the National Institute for Nuclear Theory (INT). In 2009 he left the University of Washington to become professor of physics at the University of California, Berkeley and senior faculty scientist at Lawrence Berkeley National Laboratory.

== Research ==
Haxton is engaged in nuclear astrophysics (supernovae, the solar neutrino problem, nucleosynthesis), neutrino physics (neutrino oscillations, neutrinoless double beta decay, neutrino properties), many-body theory (effective theories) in nuclear physics (as well as in atomic physics and condensed matter physics), and tests of symmetries of fundamental interactions (parity, CP-symmetry, lepton number). Haxton and his colleagues put forward a method for the formulation of an effective field theory for shell model using the harmonic oscillator basis as a regulator. He led the early efforts to convert the Homestake Mine in South Dakota to scientific use as the Deep Underground Science and Engineering Laboratory, but left the project after the mine was flooded in 2003.

Haxton has been a consultant for Los Alamos National Laboratory, Argonne National Laboratory, Lawrence Livermore National Laboratory, Brookhaven National Laboratory, TRIUMF, Oak Ridge National Laboratory, and various other laboratories and university facilities over the past two decades.

== Awards and honors ==
He is a Fellow of the American Physical Society (1987), and in the 1990s served as chair of the Division of Nuclear Physics and the Division of Astrophysics. He is a member of the United States National Academy of Sciences (1999), and a Fellow of the American Academy of Arts and Sciences, the American Association for the Advancement of Science (1988), and the Washington State Academy of Sciences.

He was a Guggenheim Fellow (2000–2001), Visiting Miller Professor at Berkeley (2001), Bethe Lecturer at Cornell University (2001) and received the 2004 Hans Bethe Prize of the American Physical Society for his contributions and scientific leadership in neutrino astrophysics and especially for the connection of nuclear physics theory with experiments and observations in nuclear astrophysics and astrophysics (eulogy).

He is a member of the American Philosophical Society (2024).
