= Ted Morgan (writer) =

American historian (1932–2023)

- Born: Comte Sanche Charles Armand Gabriel de Gramont; March 30, 1932; Geneva, Switzerland
- Died: December 13, 2023 (aged 91); New York City, U.S.
- Education: Yale University; Columbia University
- Occupations: Journalist; biographer; historian
- Writing career
- Notable awards: Pulitzer Prize for Local Reporting, Edition Time

Ted Morgan (March 30, 1932 – December 13, 2023) was a French-American biographer, journalist, and historian.

== Early life ==
Morgan was born Count Sanche Charles Armand Gabriel de Gramont in Geneva. He was the son of Gabriel Antoine Armand, Count de Gramont (1908–1943), a French diplomat who served as a pilot in the French escadrille in England during World War II, and Marie-Hélène Negroponte, sister to Dimitri Negroponte, in 1931. After his father's death, his mother married Jacques de Thier, the Belgian Ambassador to Mexico and the United Kingdom.

Gramont is an old French noble family. His father was the son of the 11th Duke of Gramont and his third wife, Maria of the Princes Ruspoli.

== Career ==
After his father died in a training flight, Morgan began to lead two parallel lives. He received his undergraduate degree from Yale University (where he was a member of Manuscript Society) in 1954 and an M.S. degree from Columbia University's Graduate School of Journalism in 1955. Although he held brief journalistic positions at The Hollywood Reporter and the Worcester Telegram during this period, he was still a member (albeit a reluctant one) of the French nobility. From 1955 to 1957, he was conscripted into the French Army amid the Algerian War, initially serving as a second lieutenant with the Senegalese Tirailleurs of the Colonial Infantry and then as a propaganda officer. He subsequently wrote in frank detail of his brutalizing experiences while on active service in the bled (Algerian countryside) and of the atrocities committed by both sides during the Battle of Algiers.

Following his military service, Morgan returned to New York as a reporter for the Associated Press (1958–59). While serving as a reporter and correspondent for the New York Herald Tribune from 1959 to 1964, he won the Pulitzer Prize for Local Reporting, Edition Time in 1961 for what was described as "his moving account of the death of Leonard Warren on the Metropolitan Opera stage." At the time, Morgan was still a French citizen writing under the name of "Sanche de Gramont".

In the 1970s, Morgan stopped using the byline "Sanche de Gramont". He became an American citizen in 1977, renouncing his titles of nobility. The name he adopted as a U.S. citizen, "Ted Morgan", is an anagram of "de Gramont". The new name was a conscious attempt to discard his aristocratic French past. He had settled on a "name that conformed with the language and cultural norms of American society, a name that telephone operators and desk clerks could hear without flinching" (On Becoming American, 1978). Morgan was featured in the CBS news program 60 Minutes in 1978. The segment explored Morgan's reasons for embracing American culture.

Morgan wrote biographies of William S. Burroughs, Jay Lovestone, Franklin Delano Roosevelt and Winston Churchill. The last-named was a finalist for the 1983 Pulitzer Prize for Biography. His 1980 biography of W. Somerset Maugham was a 1982 National Book Award finalist in its first paperback edition. (Note: Walter Lippmann and the American Century by Ronald Steel won the 1982 National Book Award for paperback "Autobiography/Biography". From 1980 to 1983 in National Book Award history there were dual hardcover and paperback awards in most categories, and several nonfiction subcategories including General Nonfiction. Like most of the paperback-award-winning books, Walter Lippmann and Maugham were reissues.) He also wrote for newspapers and magazines.

== Personal life ==
In 1958, he married Margaret Chanler Emmet Kinnicutt, a daughter of Mrs. John Benton Prosser (née Margaret Chanler Emmet) in Mexico City.

Morgan died from complications of dementia at a nursing home in Manhattan, New York City, on December 13, 2023, at the age of 91.

== Selected books ==
- Valley of Death: The Tragedy at Dien Bien Phu That Led America into the Vietnam War. Random House Publishing Group. 2010. ISBN 9781400066643.
- My Battle of Algiers. HarperCollins. 2006. ISBN 9780060852245.
- A Covert Life: Jay Lovestone, Communist, Anti-Communist and Spymaster. Random House. 1999. ISBN 9780679444008.; Random House Digital, Inc., 2011, ISBN 9780307805669
- Reds: McCarthyism in Twentieth Century America. Random House Digital, Inc. 2004. ISBN 9780812973020. "Ted Morgan."
- A Shovel of Stars: The Making of the American West 1800 to the Present. Simon & Schuster, 1996. 1995. p. 563. ISBN 9780684814926. "Ted Morgan."
- Wilderness at Dawn: The Settling of the North American Continent Simon & Schuster, 1993, ISBN 9780671690885
- An Uncertain Hour: The French, the Germans, the Jews, the Barbie Trial, and the City of Lyon, 1940–1945 (1990)
- Literary Outlaw: The Life and Times of William S. Burroughs. W. W. Norton & Company. 2012 [1988]. ISBN 9780393343243.
- FDR: A Biography, Simon & Schuster, 1985, ISBN 9780671454951
- Churchill: Young Man in a Hurry, 1874–1915, Simon & Schuster, 1982; Simon & Schuster, 1984, ISBN 9780671253042
- Rowing toward Eden, Houghton Mifflin, 1981, ISBN 9780395297148
- Maugham Simon & Schuster, 1980, ISBN 9780671240776
- On Becoming American Houghton Mifflin, 1978
- The Strong Brown God: The Story of the Niger River, Hart Davis, MacGibbon, 1975 (as Sanche de Gramont)
- Lives To Give (1971) (as Sanche de Gramont)
- Epitaph for kings Putnam, 1968 (as Sanche de Gramont)
- The French: Portrait of a people (1969) (as Sanche de Gramont)
- The Age of Magnificence: Memoirs of the Court of Louis XIV by the Duc de Saint-Simon, Putnam, 1963 (selected, edited, and translated by Sanche de Gramont)
- The Secret War: The story of international espionage since 1945 (1962) (as Sanche de Gramont)
