= Gerald Haxton =

W. Somerset Maugham's lover (1892-1944)

Frederick Gerald Haxton (1892 – November 7, 1944), a native of San Francisco, was the long term secretary and lover of novelist and playwright W. Somerset Maugham.

He and Maugham met at the outbreak of World War I when they both began serving as part of a Red Cross ambulance unit in French Flanders.

== Secrecy and arrest ==
Maugham, and to a lesser extent Haxton, had been affected by the trial of Oscar Wilde. Common to men who were either homosexual or, in the case of Maugham, bisexual (Maugham had had an affair with the actress Sue Jones before meeting Haxton and later had a child with Syrie Wellcome whom he married), neither spoke of their situation for fear of recrimination.

However, in November 1915, Haxton and another man, John Lindsell, were arrested in a Covent Garden hotel in London and charged with gross indecency. Military policemen, while looking for deserters, had burst into the hotel room of Haxton and Lindsell to find them committing a homosexual act that was not buggery. On December 7 that same year, both men were indicted under the same law that had been used to prosecute Wilde. However, unlike Wilde, when the two men appeared in the Central Criminal Court at the Old Bailey on December 10, they were both acquitted.

== Deportation ==
Haxton left England shortly thereafter.

After touring the South Pacific islands, Haxton was aboard the Hitachi Maru en route to South Africa when the ship was captured by the German raider SMS Wolf in September 1917. Haxton was a prisoner aboard the Wolf until February 1918 when the Wolf returned to Germany and he was transferred to a German prison camp. He was reunited with Maugham in 1919.

On attempting to return in February 1919, he was deported from Britain as an undesirable alien and was never allowed to enter the country again. Haxton's Home Office file, containing the reason or reasons for his banishment, was sealed until 2019. Writer Robert Calder speculates that Syrie Maugham may have used her high connections in the British government to have Haxton deported.

Because Maugham and Haxton traveled abroad and chose to live on the French Riviera in the "Villa La Mauresque", they were able to carry on their relationship despite Haxton's deportation. They lived in Villa La Mauresque at Cap Ferrat almost exclusively until they were forced to flee the advancing Germans at the commencement of World War II.

It is thought that Haxton's flamboyant nature, said to be portrayed in the character Rowley Flint in Up at the Villa, was the key to Maugham's popularity with members of society wherever the pair traveled.

== Later years and death ==
Haxton remained Maugham's constant companion for 30 years. He died of tuberculosis and alcoholism on November 7, 1944 at Doctors Hospital in New York. Maugham later placed the following dedication in his 1949 compilation, A Writer's Notebook: "In Loving Memory of My Friend Frederick Gerald Haxton, 1892–1944".
