= Fred Haxton =

English footballer

Personal information
- Full name: Frederick Robert Haxton
- Date of birth: October 1879
- Place of birth: Southwark, England
- Date of death: 1933 (aged 53–54)
- Place of death: Northumberland, England
- Position: Left-half

Youth career
- Chandlers Ford Star

Senior career*
Years	Team	Apps	(Gls)
1899–1900	Eastleigh Athletic		
1900–1901	Chandlers Ford United		
1901–1904	Eastleigh Athletic		
1904–1906	Southampton	3	(0)
1906–1909	Eastleigh Athletic		
- * Club domestic league appearances and goals

Frederick Robert Haxton (1879–1933) was an English professional footballer who made three appearances at left-half in the Southern League for Southampton in the 1900s, but spent most of his football career with Eastleigh Athletic in the Hampshire League.

== Football career ==
Haxton was born in the parish of St Olave's in Southwark, South London but by his teens was living in Chandler's Ford, Hampshire. As a youth, he first played football with Chandlers Ford Star, before joining Eastleigh Athletic for the first time in September 1899. He spent a year with Chandlers Ford United from 1900 to 1901, before returning to Eastleigh Athletic for another three years.

In January 1904, he "assisted" Southampton's reserve team, before signing for the club in the 1904 close season. Regarded as a "keen, untiring fellow" who was as "hard as nails", he spent most of his time with the "Saints" in the reserves, being part of the side which won the Hampshire Senior Cup in 1905.

He made his first-team debut on 1 October 1904, when England international Bert Houlker was injured. In the Southern League match against Brighton & Hove Albion, he played at left-half in a 1–1 draw. His next appearance came six months later on 25 March 1905, when he again replaced Houlker, in a 2–1 victory at Portsmouth, with his third and final appearance on 11 November 1905, this time replacing Samuel Meston against Bristol Rovers (lost 5–1).

Haxton left Southampton in 1906 and returned to Eastleigh Athletic until moving to Manchester in 1909.
