= Liza of Lambeth =

1897 novel by William Somerset Maugham

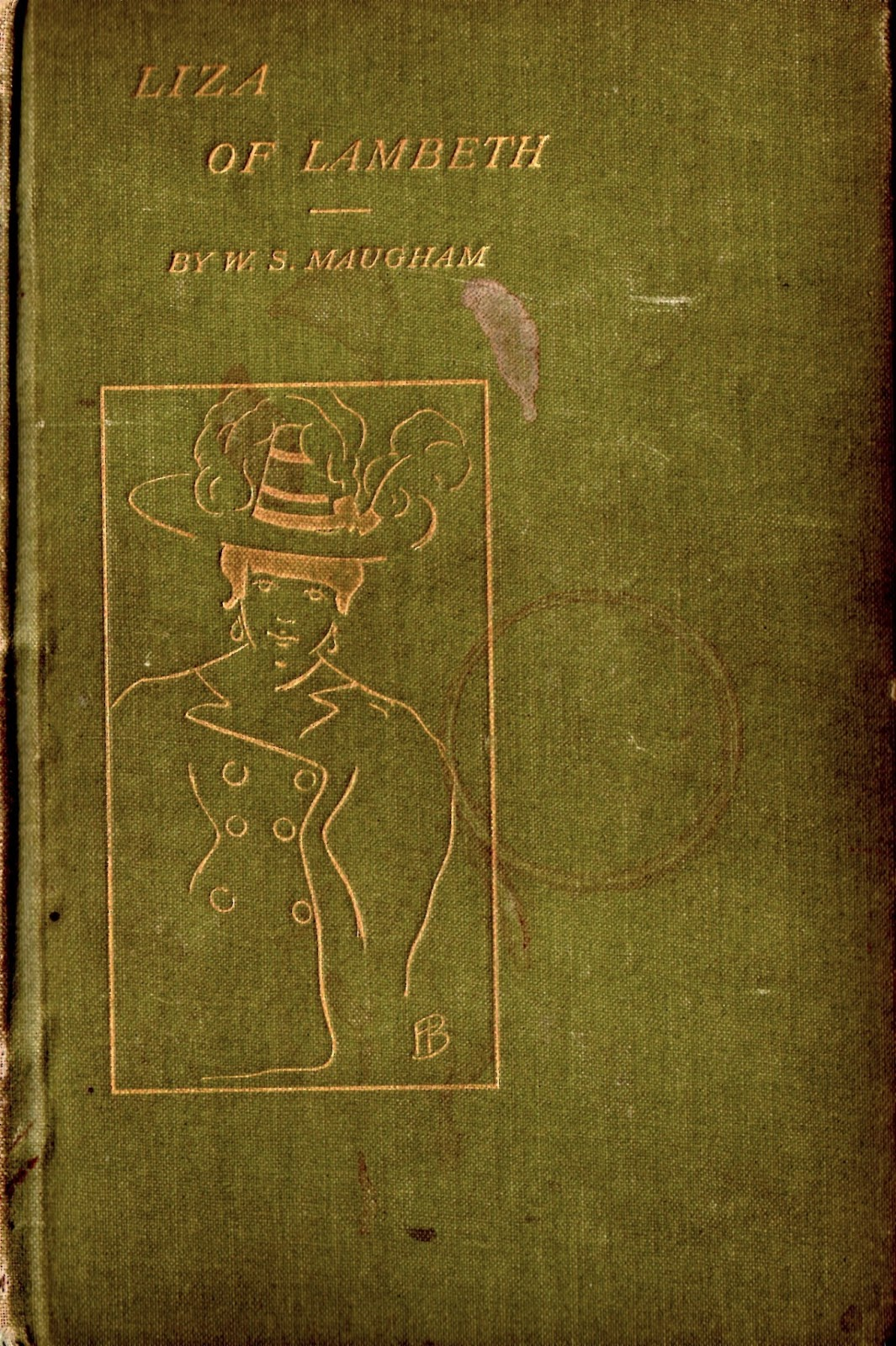
- First edition cover
- Author: W. Somerset Maugham
- Working title: A Lambeth Idyll
- Language: English
- Genre: Novel
- Set in: Lambeth, August—November, a year c. 1892–96
- Published: 1897
- Publisher: T. Fisher Unwin
- Publication place: United Kingdom
- Media type: Print: hardback
- Pages: 242+6
- Dewey Decimal: 823.89
- LC Class: PR6025.A86 L45
- Followed by: The Making of a Saint
- Text: Liza of Lambeth at Wikisource

Liza of Lambeth (1897) was W. Somerset Maugham's first novel, which he wrote while he was a medical student and obstetric clerk at St Thomas's Hospital in Lambeth, then a working-class district of London. It depicts the short life and death of Liza Kemp, an 18-year-old factory worker who lives with her aging mother in the fictional Vere Street off Westminster Bridge Road (real) in Lambeth.

== Plot summary ==
The action covers a period of roughly four months—from August to November—in a year in the 1890s. Liza Kemp is an 18-year-old factory worker and the youngest of a large family, now living alone with her aging mother. Very popular with all the residents of Vere Street, Lambeth, she likes Tom, a boy her age, but not as much as he likes her, so she rejects him when he proposes. Nevertheless, she is persuaded to join a party of 32 who make a coach trip (in a horse-drawn coach, of course) to Chingford, then on the northern outskirts of London, on the August Bank Holiday Monday. Some of the other members of the party are Tom; Liza's friend Sally and her boyfriend Harry; and Jim Blakeston, a 40-year-old father of 5 who has recently moved to Vere Street with his large family, and his wife (while their eldest daughter, Polly, is taking care of her siblings). The outing is fun, and they all get drunk on beer. On their way back in the dark, Liza realises that Jim is making a pass at her by holding her hand. Back home, Jim manages to speak to her alone and to steal a kiss from her.

Liza feels attracted to Jim. They never appear together in public because they do not want the other residents of Vere Street or their workmates to start talking about them. One of Jim's first steps to win Liza's heart is to go to a melodramatic play with her on Saturday night. Afterwards, they have sex. When autumn arrives and the nights get chillier, Liza's secret meetings with Jim become less comfortable and more trying; they must meet in the third-class waiting-room of Waterloo station. To Liza's dismay, people do start talking about them despite their precautions. Only Liza's mother, a drunkard and a simple person, doesn't know about their affair. After Sally gets married, she soon becomes pregnant. With Sally married and stuck at home, and even Tom seemingly shunning her, Liza feels increasingly isolated, but her love for Jim keeps her going. They do talk about their love affair: about the possibility of Jim leaving his wife and children ("I dunno if I could get on without the kids"); about Liza not being able to leave her mother, who needs her help; about living somewhere else "as if we was married". Soon the situation deteriorates completely; Mrs Blakeston, who is pregnant again, opposes Jim's affair with Liza by refusing to talk to him, then goes around telling other people what she would do with Liza if she caught her, and those people inform Liza, who is frightened. One Saturday afternoon in November, Liza is on her way home from work when the angry Mrs. Blakeston confronts her, spits in her face, and physically attacks her. Quickly a crowd gathers, not to abate the fight, but to abet it. ("The audience shouted and cheered and clapped their hands.")

Eventually, both Tom and Jim stop the fight, and Tom walks Liza home. Liza is now publicly stigmatised as a "wrong one", a fact she herself admits to Tom ("Oh, but I 'ave treated yer bad. I'm a regular wrong 'un, I am"). Tom wants to marry Liza, but she tells him that "it's too lite now" because she thinks she is pregnant. Tom says he wouldn't mind that, but she insists on refusing. Meanwhile, at the Blakestons' house, Jim beats his wife. Other residents hear them and young Polly appeals to some for help, but they choose not to interfere in other people's domestic problems ("She'll git over it; an' p'raps she deserves it, for all you know"). When Mrs Kemp comes home and sees her daughter's injuries, all she does is offer her some alcohol (whiskey or gin). That evening they both get drunk. During the next night Liza has a miscarriage. Mr Hodges, who lives upstairs, fetches a doctor from the nearby hospital, who soon says he can do nothing for her. While her daughter is dying, Mrs Kemp has a long talk with Mrs Hodges, a midwife and sick-nurse. Liza's last visitor is Jim, but Liza is already in a coma. Mrs Kemp and Mrs Hodges are talking about the funeral arrangements when they hear Liza's death rattle and the doctor declares her dead.

== Theatrical adaptations ==
A musical based – albeit loosely – on the novel was written by Willie Rushton and Berny Stringle, with music by Cliff Adams. It opened at the Shaftesbury Theatre in London in June 1976, and ran for 110 performances. It was produced by Ben Arbeid, directed by Berny Stringle, musically directed by John Burrows, and starred Angela Richards (best known as a regular in the BBC's Secret Army) in the title role, Patricia Hayes, Ron Pember, Bryan Marshall, Christopher Neil, Tina Martin, Michael Robbins and Eric Shilling.

The musical style is predominantly music hall, but the show includes a parody of Gilbert and Sullivan, a church choir arrangement with some completely incongruous lyrics (A Little Bit on the Side), and some touching ballads.

The Tart with a Heart of Gold was cut from the West End production, and is also missing from the original London cast recording (Thames THA 100), despite it describing the entire raison d'être of one of the main female characters.

The musical has not been officially published for amateur performance, but it is occasionally licensed for amateurs. The world amateur premiere was performed at the Erith Playhouse in Erith, Kent, in June 1977, and was attended by members of the London production team. The rights to this musical are currently held by Thames Music in London.
