= W. Somerset Maugham on stage and screen =

The playwright, novelist and short-story writer W. Somerset Maugham, was a prolific author from the late 19th century until the 1960s. Most of his earliest successes were for the theatre, but he gave up writing plays after 1932. Many of his plays have been adapted for broadcasting and the cinema, as have several of his novels and short stories. The New York Times commented in 1964, "There are times when one thinks that British television and radio would have to shut up shop if there were not an apparently inexhaustible supply of stories by Maugham to turn into 30-minute plays. One recalls, too, the long list of movies that have been made from his novels − Of Human Bondage, The Moon and Sixpence, The Painted Veil, The Razor's Edge and the rest."

== Plays ==
Title	Type	Acts	Premiere (West End except where noted)	Initial run	Ref
Schiffbruchig (Marriages are Made in Heaven)	romantic comedy	1	1902, Berlin	8	
Mademoiselle Zampa	farce	1	1904	20	
A Man of Honour	drama	4	1904 (Note: There were two try-out performances by the Stage Society in 1903.)	28	
Lady Frederick	comedy	3	1907	422	
The Explorer	drama	4	1908	48	
Mrs Dot	light comedy	3	1908	272	
Jack Straw	comedy	3	1908	321	
Penelope	comedy	3	1909	246	
The Noble Spaniard (Note: Adaptation of Les Gaîtés du veuvage (1904) by Ernest Grenet-Dancourt.)	farce	3	1909	55	
Smith	comedy	4	1909	168	
The Tenth Man	tragic comedy	3	1910	65	
Grace (Note: Though it was staged as Grace, Maugham originally gave the play the title Landed Gentry, under which it was published.)	drama	4	1910	72	
Loaves and Fishes	satire	4	1911	48	
The Perfect Gentleman (Note: Adaptation of Le bourgeois gentilhomme, written to precede Thomas Beecham's presentation of Ariadne auf Naxos.)	comedy	1	1913	8	
The Land of Promise	romantic drama	4	1913	76	
Caroline (Note: The play was staged as Caroline, but Maugham originally gave the play the title The Unattainable, under which it was published.)	light comedy	3	1916	141	
Our Betters	comedy	3	1917, New York; 1923, West End	112; 548	
Love In a Cottage	drama	4	1918	127	
Caesar's Wife	romantic drama	3	1919	241	
Home and Beauty (Note: First seen on Broadway in 1919 under the title Too Many Husbands.)	farce	3	1919	235	
The Unknown	drama	3	1920	77	
The Circle	comedy	3	1921	181	
East of Suez	drama	7 scenes	1922	209	
The Camel's Back	farce	3	1924	76	
The Road Uphill	drama	3	1924 play, unproduced		
The Constant Wife	comedy	3	1926, New York	295	
The Letter (Note: Dramatised by Maugham from his short story of the same name, published in The Casuarina Tree (1926).)	drama	3	1927	338	
The Sacred Flame	drama	3	1929	209	
The Breadwinner	comedy	3	1930	158	
For Services Rendered	drama	3	1933	78	
The Mask and the Face (Note: Adaptation of La maschera e il volto (1917) by Luigi Chiarelli.)	satire	3	1933, Boston and New York	40	
Sheppey	comedy	3	1933	83	

== Film adaptations ==
Cinema and television versions of Maugham plays, novels and short stories include:

- The Explorer (1915), directed by George Melford. Based on the play of the same name.
- The Land of Promise (1917), directed by Joseph Kaufman and starring Thomas Meighan and David van Eyck. Based on the play of the same name.
- Smith (1917), directed by Maurice Elvey. Based on the play of the same name.
- The Divorcée (1919), directed by Herbert Blaché. Based on the play Lady Frederick.
- Jack Straw (1920), directed by William C. deMille. Based on the play of the same name.
- East of Suez (1925), directed by Raoul Walsh. Based on the seven-act play of the same name.
- The Circle (1925), directed by Frank Borzage. Based on the play of the same name.
- Infatuation (1925), directed by Irving Cummings. Based on Caesar's Wife.
- The Canadian (1926), directed by William Beaudine. Based on the play The Land of Promise, this was a remake of the 1917 film of that name, with Thomas Meighan reprising his role as Frank Taylor.
- The Magician (1926). Based on the novel of the same name.
- Sadie Thompson (1928), a silent movie starring Gloria Swanson and Lionel Barrymore. Based on the short story "Miss Thompson", which was later retitled "Rain".
- The Letter (1929), featuring Jeanne Eagels, O.P. Heggie, Reginald Owen and Herbert Marshall. Based on the play of the same name.
- Charming Sinners (1929), featuring Ruth Chatterton, Clive Brook, Mary Nolan and William Powell. Based on the play The Constant Wife.
- Strictly Unconventional (1930), directed by David Burton. Based on The Circle.
- Rain (1932), with Joan Crawford and Walter Huston. The first sound version of the short story "Miss Thompson" (later retitled "Rain").
- The Narrow Corner (1933), starring Douglas Fairbanks Jr. and directed by Alfred E. Green. Based on the novel of the same name.
- Our Betters (1933), directed by George Cukor. Based on the play of the same name.
- Of Human Bondage (1934), starring Leslie Howard and Bette Davis. Based on the novel of the same name.
- The Painted Veil (1934), featuring Greta Garbo and Herbert Marshall. Based on the novel of the same name.
- The Right to Live (1935), starring George Brent and Josephine Hutchinson. Based on the play The Sacred Flame.
- Secret Agent (1936), starring John Gielgud, Peter Lorre, Madeleine Carroll and Robert Young, directed by Alfred Hitchcock. Based on Ashenden.
- The Tenth Man (1936), directed by Brian Desmond Hurst. Based on the play of the same name.
- Isle of Fury (1936), starring Humphrey Bogart. Based on the novel The Narrow Corner.
- Another Dawn (1937), starring Errol Flynn. Based on the play Caesar's Wife.
- The Vessel of Wrath (1938), starring Charles Laughton; released in the United States as The Beachcomber. Based on the novella of the same name.
- The Letter (1940), featuring Bette Davis, Herbert Marshall, James Stephenson, Frieda Inescort and Gale Sondergaard. Based on the play of the same name.
- Too Many Husbands (1940), featuring Jean Arthur, Fred MacMurray and Melvyn Douglas. Based on the play Home and Beauty.
- The Moon and Sixpence (1942) with George Sanders. Based on the novel of the same name.
- Christmas Holiday (1944), starring Deanna Durbin and Gene Kelly, based on the novel of the same name.
- The Hour Before the Dawn (1944), starring Veronica Lake, based on the novel of the same name.
- Dirty Gertie from Harlem U.S.A. (1946). Unauthorized film version of "Miss Thompson" with an all-black cast, directed by Spencer Williams.
- The Razor's Edge (1946). featuring Tyrone Power and Gene Tierney. Based on the novel of the same name.
- Of Human Bondage (1946), a version starring Eleanor Parker.
- The Unfaithful (1947), starring Ann Sheridan, based on The Letter.
- Quartet (1948). Maugham appears as himself in introductions. Based on four of his short stories.

- The Facts of Life. Directed by Ralph Smart. From the short story collection The Mixture as Before.
- The Alien Corn. Directed by Harold French. From the short story collection First Person Singular.
- The Kite. Directed by Arthur Crabtree. From the short story collection Creatures of Circumstance.
- The Colonel's Lady. Directed by Ken Annakin. From the short story collection Creatures of Circumstance.

- Trio (1950). Maugham appears as himself in introductions. Another collection based on short stories.

- The Verger. Directed by Ken Annakin. From the short story collection Cosmopolitans.
- Mr Knowall. Directed by Ken Annakin. From the short story collection Cosmopolitans.
- Sanatorium Directed by Harold French. From the short story collection Creatures of Circumstance.

- Encore (1951). Maugham appears as himself in introductions. A third collection of Maugham short stories.

- The Ant and the Grasshopper. Directed by Pat Jackson. From the short story collection Cosmopolitans.
- Winter Cruise. Directed by Anthony Pelissier. From the short story collection Creatures of Circumstance.
- Gigolo and Gigolette. Directed by Harold French. From the short story collection The Mixture as Before.

- Miss Sadie Thompson (1953), a semi-musical version in 3-D, featuring Rita Hayworth and José Ferrer.
- The Beachcomber (1954). Based on the novella The Vessel of Wrath; not to be confused with the 1938 film.
- The Letter (1956), TV adaptation starring Siobhan McKenna. Based on the play of the same name.
- The Seventh Sin (1957), with Eleanor Parker. Based on the novel The Painted Veil.
- Julia, du bist zauberhaft (1962), starring Lilli Palmer and Charles Boyer. Based on the novel Theatre.
- Of Human Bondage (1964), with Laurence Harvey and Kim Novak.
- W. Somerset Maugham – a series of 26 adaptations for BBC television, 1969–1970:

- A Casual Affair

Norman Bird as Arthur Low, Gwen Cherrell as Joan Low, James Maxwell as Jack Almond, Hildegard Neil as Lady Kastellan, Richard Vernon as Lord Kastellan, Esmond Knight as Sir Montague Trafford. Director: Waris Hussein

- The Back of Beyond

Daniel Massey as Knobby Clarke, Julian Glover as Tom Saffary, Mary Peach as Violet Saffary, Georgina Hale as Enid Clarke. Director: John Frankau

- The Creative Impulse

Brenda de Banzie as Mrs Albert Forrester, John Le Mesurier as Mr Albert Forrester, Megs Jenkins as Mrs Bulfinch, Derek Hart as the Narrator. Director: James Cellan Jones

- The Letter

Eileen Atkins as Leslie Crosbie, Andre Morell as George Joyce, Peter Bowles as Robert Crosbie. Director: Christopher Morahan

- A Man with a Conscience

Keith Barron as Jean Charvin, John Glyn-Jones as Jean-Paul Giradous, John Phillips as The Commandant. Director: Henri Safran

- The Three Fat Women of Antibes

Renee Houston as Frank Hickson, Elspeth March as Beatrice Richman, June Ellis as Arrow Sutcliffe, Elizabeth Sellars as Lena Finch. Director: Bill Hays

- P. and O.

Margaret Tyzack as Mrs Hamlyn, Peter Barkworth as Mr Jephson, Martin Jarvis as Dr. Naughton. Director: Gilchrist Calder

- Lord Mountdrago

Michael Goodliffe as Lord Mountdrago, William Squire as Owen Griffiths, Cyril Luckham as Sir Philip Brandower, Yootha Joyce as Elvira, Paul Whitsun-Jones as Bracegirdle. Director: Moira Armstrong

- Louise

Sarah Badel as Louise, Pauline Yates as Betty Maitland, Neil Stacy as Tom Maitland. Director: Guy Verney

- Episode

Joe Brown as Fred Manson, Anna Calder-Marshall as Gracie Carter, Jerome Willis as Ned Preston. Director: John Warrington

- Mother Love (based on A Woman of Fifty)

Rossano Brazzi as The Count, Amanda Murray as Laura Clayton, Peter Egan as Tito. Director: Claude Whatham

- The Fall of Edward Barnard

Robert Sherman as Bateman Hunter, Ed Bishop as Edward Barnard. Director: John Matthews

- Before the Party

Anna Massey as Millicent Bannon, Joss Ackland as Harold Bannon, Fanny Rowe as Mrs Skinner, Anna Cropper as Kathleen Skinner, Clive Morton as Mr Skinner, Avice Landon as Mrs Grey, Geoffrey Chater as Mr Grey. Director: James Ferman

- The Force of Circumstance

John Stride as Guy Wilkes, Lynn Farleigh as Doris Hanson, Lally Bowers as Mrs Hanson. Director: John Frankau

- Jane

Rachel Kempson as Jane, Georgina Cookson as Marion Towers, Gerald Flood as Geoffrey Mandeville, Dennis Price as Admiral Frobisher. Director: Guy Verney

- Rain

Carroll Baker as Sadie Thompson, Michael Bryant as Mr Davidson, Gordon Jackson as Dr MacPhail. Director: John MacKenzie

- The Unconquered

Michael Pennington as Hans. Director: Gilchrist Calder

- The Vessel of Wrath

James Booth as Ginger Ted, Siân Phillips as Martha Jones, John Glyn-Jones as the Rev Owen Jones. Director: Gareth Davies

- Olive (based on The Book Bag)

Eileen Atkins as Olive Hardy, Edward Fox as Tim Hardy, Martin Potter as Mark Featherstone. Director: James Cellan Jones

- The Closed Shop

Charles Gray as the Storyteller, Peter Jeffrey as El Presidente Two, Paul Whitsun-Jones as El Presidente One, John Junkin as Don Agosto. Director: Moira Armstrong

- The Door of Opportunity

Marianne Faithfull as Anne Torel, Ian Ogilvy as Alban Torel. Director: William Slater

- Virtue

Daphne Slater as Margery Bishop, Graham Crowden as Bill Marsh, Arthur Pentelow as Charlie Bishop. Director: John Davies

- Footprints in the Jungle

Heather Sears as Margaret Bronson, Ronald Lewis as Reggie Bronson, Edward Petherbridge as Theo Cartwright, James Bolam as Leslie Gaze. Director: Michael Lindsay-Hogg

- The Alien Corn

Max Adrian as Ferdy Rabenstein, Patience Collier as Hannah, Lady Bland, Faith Brook as Muriel Bland, Sydney Tafler as Sir Adolphus Bland, Gwen Watford as Lea Makart. Director: William Slater

- The Human Element

Ronald Hines as Humphrey Carruthers, Ann Lynn as Lady Betty, Sean Caffrey as Albert. Director: James MacTaggart

- Flotsam and Jetsam

Dorothy Tutin as Mrs Grange, Lee Montague as Mr Grange, Julian Holloway as Jack Carr. Director: Claude Whatham

- Theatre (1978), starring Vija Artmane. Based on the novel of the same name.
- The Letter (1982), featuring Lee Remick, Jack Thompson and Ronald Pickup. Based on the play of the same name. (Made for television.)
- The Razor's Edge (1984), with Bill Murray. Based on the novel of the same name.
- Up at the Villa (2000), starring Kristin Scott Thomas and Sean Penn, directed by Philip Haas. Based on the novella of the same name.
- Being Julia (2004), featuring Annette Bening. Based on the novel Theatre.
- The Painted Veil (2006), with Naomi Watts and Edward Norton. Based on the novel of the same name.

== Notes, references and sources ==
=== Sources ===
- Curtis, Anthony; John Whitehead (1987). W. Somerset Maugham: The Critical Heritage. London and New York: Routledge and Kegan Paul. ISBN 978-0-415-15925-8.
- Mander, Raymond; Joe Mitchenson (1955). Theatrical Companion to Maugham. London: Rockliffe. OCLC 1336174067.
