= Gin pahit =

Alcoholic drink made with gin and bitters

Gin pahit is an alcoholic drink made with gin and Angostura bitters, as enjoyed in colonial Malaya and generally associated with British colonial era. The name means "bitter gin" in Malay.

The recipe, according to the food and beverage service of the Raffles Hotel, is 1½ ounces of gin and ½ ounce of Angostura bitters. At least one book on drinks from the 1930s describes it as identical to a pink gin, which would imply considerably less bitters.

It was referred to by the writer W. Somerset Maugham. For example, his short story, "P. & O." (Copyright 1926), Maugham's character Gallagher, an Irishman who had lived in the Federated Malay States for 25 years, orders the drink. Gin pahit appears in several other Maugham stories, including "The Yellow Streak", set in Borneo, "Footprints in the Jungle", "The Book-Bag" and "The Letter" all set in Malaya, in "The Outstation" (Two Malay boys,..., came in, one bearing gin pahits,..), and in the novel The Narrow Corner (opening line of Chapter xviii).

Maugham himself spent many years in Maritime Southeast Asia and was acquainted with the drink from his travels. He refers to gin pahit in the opening pages of his 1930 travelogue "The Gentleman in the Parlour" (Chapter iii). The Raffles Long Bar in Singapore listed gin pahit on the cocktail board as late as 1985 but other references to pink gins are correct – a traditional Royal Navy drink ("..one had no ice, d'you see?") of gin and bitters where the bitters were added to the glass first and the barman would then ask "In or Out, Sir?"

The drink is also mentioned by Captain Biggar in The Return of Jeeves by P.G. Wodehouse.

David A. Embury states that this drink is made with yellow gin and 3 dashes of Angostura bitters to 2 dashes of absinthe, in The Fine Art of Mixing Drinks.

== See also ==
- List of cocktails
