= The House of Doors =

2023 novel by Tan Twan Eng

- Author: Tan Twan Eng
- Language: English
- Set in: Federated Malay States
- Publisher: Bloomsbury Publishing
- Publication date: 2023
- Pages: 320
- ISBN: 978-1639731930

The House of Doors is a 2023 historical novel by Tan Twan Eng, published by Bloomsbury Publishing. Set in the 1920s British colony of the Federated Malay States, the novel tells the stories of the local residents and visitors, including fictionalized depictions of writer William Somerset Maugham and Chinese revolutionary leader Sun Yat-sen. It reimagines how Maugham obtained source material for his 1926 short story "The Letter", which he converted the next year into a play that was later adapted many times for film and television.

The House of Doors was longlisted for the 2023 Booker Prize and listed among notable fiction works in 2023 by The Washington Post and The Financial Times.

== Narrative ==
The book offers a fictionalized account of William Somerset Maugham's travels through the Federated Malay States in the 1920s. While in Penang, Maugham and Gerald Haxton—who is ostensibly the writer's travelling secretary but is actually his lover—stay with Maugham's old friend Robert Hamlyn. Robert and his wife Lesley are British expatriates living in what was then called British Malaya. During his two-week visit, Maugham develops a friendship with Lesley.

This eventually leads Lesley to confide in Maugham, divulging personal secrets which will become subjects of Maugham's literary works. She reveals her dissatisfaction with her marriage. Robert suffers from lung trouble after being exposed to chemical weapons during World War I. He is now pressuring Lesley, much to her dismay, to move with their two sons to Karoo, South Africa, where he believes the desert climate will improve his health. Years earlier, she had learned of Robert's infidelity. Lesley tells Maugham about her own extramarital affair with Dr. Arthur Loh, a member of Sun Yat-sen's entourage when the famed leader was in Malaya to raise funds for his revolutionary campaign. Lesley says she felt justified in engaging in the adulterous liaison with Arthur, her true love, after discovering Robert was unfaithful. Lesley also gives Maugham an inside account of the story of her friend Ethel Proudlock, who was tried for murder in 1911 after killing a man she claimed had tried to rape her.

== Reception ==
Writing for The Guardian in a mixed review, critic Xan Brooks stated: "Sun [Yat-sen], in his way, is as much a storyteller as Maugham. But his revolutionary adventure feels undercooked and imported. We view it via Lesley, the white colonial wife, and her vision of events is partial and obscured." Brooks added that the novel's many eclectic storylines somewhat reduce the overall quality: "The sheer weight of its interests sometimes slows it down."

In an NPR review, Heller McAlpin called the novel "a paean to the art of transforming life experiences into literature." McAlpin commended Tan's ambitious creativity in reimagining Maugham's celebrated works about Malaya from a new perspective. Writing for The Financial Times, Michael Arditti described the novel as "expertly constructed, tightly plotted and richly atmospheric."

The House of Doors was named one of the "50 notable works of fiction" for 2023 by The Washington Post and among the "best books of 2023" in fiction by The Financial Times. It was longlisted for the 2023 Booker Prize, whose listing characterizes it as a "masterful novel of public morality and private truth" which "examines love and betrayal under the shadow of Empire."

== See also ==
- Ethel Proudlock case
- The Letter (short story)
- The Letter (play)
