= The Gift of Rain =

2007 novel by Tan Twan Eng

- First edition (UK)
- Author: Tan Twan Eng
- Cover artist: Caroline Tomlinson for jellylondon.com
- Language: English
- Publisher: Myrmidon (UK); Weinstein (US)
- Publication date: 2007 (UK), 2008 (US)
- Publication place: United Kingdom
- Media type: Print & eBook
- Pages: 448
- ISBN: 1-905802-04-8
- Followed by: The Garden of Evening Mists (2012)

The Gift of Rain is the first novel by Malaysian novelist Tan Twan Eng. It was published in 2007 by Myrmidon Books in the United Kingdom and the following year by Weinstein Books in the United States, and was longlisted for the Man Booker Prize that year.

== Plot ==
The novel is set in Penang. It concerns Philip Hutton, of mixed Chinese-English heritage, and his relationship with Hayato Endo, a Japanese diplomat who teaches him aikido. As war looms and the Japanese invade, both Endo and Philip find themselves torn between their loyalty to each other, versus loyalty to their country and family, respectively. Philip decides to assist the Japanese and Endo in administering the country in an attempt to keep his family safe, but wherever possible, he passes intelligence to the guerrilla fighters of Force 136, which include his best friend Kon.

== Characters ==
- Philip Hutton (Philip Arminius Khoo-Hutton) - The son of Noel Hutton and his second wife Khoo Yu Lian, who becomes an aikido student of Hayato Endo. He works for the Japanese in an attempt to protect his family, but later begins to pass intelligence to the resistance, saving many lives. He spends his later life living with a mix of scorn and admiration from the populace who view him as either a traitor or a saviour.
- Hayato Endo - Philip's aikido master, a Japanese diplomat with a dark secret, and whose father was condemned as a traitor after he criticised the emperor. At the end of the novel he convinces Philip to spare him the war crime tribunals and help him to commit seppuku to break the cycle that he and Philip have repeated throughout history.
- Michiko Murakami - An old widow and Hayato Endo's love interest. Philip telling her about Endo is the framing device for the story.
- Noel Hutton - The father of William, Edward, Isabel and Philip, and head of a large trading company Graham Hutton & Sons. He is executed after volunteering to take Philip's place once the latter's collusion with the resistance is uncovered.
- William Hutton - Philip's half-brother who joins the navy and later dies when Japanese planes sink his ship.
- Isabel Hutton - Philip's half-sister who helps the resistance and is betrayed by Uncle Lim. She is shot by Hayato Endo to save her from a worse fate.
- Edward Hutton - Philip's half-brother who dies while working on the death railway in Burma.
- Akasaki Saotome - Endo's superior in KL and is later killed by Yong Kwan after being Philip tips off Force 136 to Saotome's plan to ambush the guerrillas.
- Yeap Chee Kon - Son of Towkay Yeap and aikido student of Hideki Tanaka. He becomes Philip's friend and later joins Force 136. Near the end of the war he is killed by one of his fellow guerrillas and lover, Sen Yu, and Yong Kwan when trying to escape with Tanaka and Philip.
- Uncle Lim - The Hutton family's chauffeur who is fervently anti-Japanese. He later betrays the Huttons whom he blames for his daughter Ming's death.
- Khoo Yu Mei - Philip's aunt and Yu Lian's older sister, whose husband Harry was killed in a riot between the Chinese and Malays. She is tortured and executed by the Japanese for helping the resistance.
- Khoo Wu An - Philip's grandfather, and the father of Yu Mei and Yu Lian, who once tutored the Emperor Wen Zu. Philip never sees him after the war with no-one knowing where he went after Philip's final meeting near the end of the war.
- Ming - Daughter of the family chauffeur, Uncle Lim. She is brought to Penang when the Japanese invade China, and later marries a local fisherman, Ah Hock. Her husband dies during the Sook Ching massacre and she commits suicide afterwards.
- Henry Cross - Patriarch of the Empire Trading, the largest trading house in Penang, and the only one larger than Noel Hutton's own company at the time
- George Cross - Son of Henry Cross
- Shigeru Hiroshi - The Japanese consul in Penang who has an altercation with Philip when the latter questions his assertion on the Japanese army's discipline by mentioning the Nanjing Massacre
- Hideki Tanaka - Kon's master who shared the same master as Endo. He had been in love with Michiko who, along with their master, had asked Tanaka to go to Penang and watch over Endo. He becomes Kon's teacher in his time there. He is later used as bait to lure Kon into a failed ambush but is taken prisoner by the guerrillas as his relationship with Kon must stay hidden and so he is tortured by Yong Kwan. Kon and Philip help him escape but he is too wounded to flee and so Kon helps him commit Seppuku.
- Penelope Cheah - A journalist who interviews Philip and whose grandfather is a victim of a torture by a Japanese soldier
- Martin Edgecumbe - A drunken Englishman who is saved by Phillip and Kon and is revealed as a secret agent
- Towkay Yeap - Kon's father, a triad leader, who is a key figure in the resistance.
- Peter MacAllister - Lawyer of the Huttons with whom Isabel falls in love, and who is sent to Changi prison along with Edward, and later to work on the death railway in Burma. He is killed while attempting to escape.
- Fujihara - A sadistic Japanese general.
- Su Yen - A female Communist guerrilla who leaves Yong Kwan to become Kon's lover. She becomes embittered after having to abort her child, and later plays a pivotal role in Kon's death.
- Ah Hock - Ming's husband who dies at the hands of the Japanese during the Sook Ching pogrom.
- Chua - Ah Hock's father and village headman of Kampong Dugong.
- Yong Kwan - A vicious guerrilla leader from the Communist Party of Malaya, who is suspicious of Kon and Philip.
- General Erskine - A British general who leads the return of Allied troops to Penang and accepts Japanese surrender on the island.

== Reviews ==
- Jordison, Sam (31 August 2007). "Booker club: The Gift of Rain by Tan Twan Eng". The Guardian.
- Lake, Ed (18 August 2007). "Man Booker 2007 Prize: The Gift of Rain". The Telegraph.
- McCulloch, Alison (13 July 2008). "Sunday Book Review: Fiction Chronicle". The New York Times.
- Gardner, Elysa. "'Gift of Rain' bestows lessons during times of love and war". USA Today.
- Harris, Michael (23 June 2008). "The road not taken, or a predestined outcome?". Los Angeles Times.
