= Tom Lin Shu-yu =

Taiwanese director and screenwriter

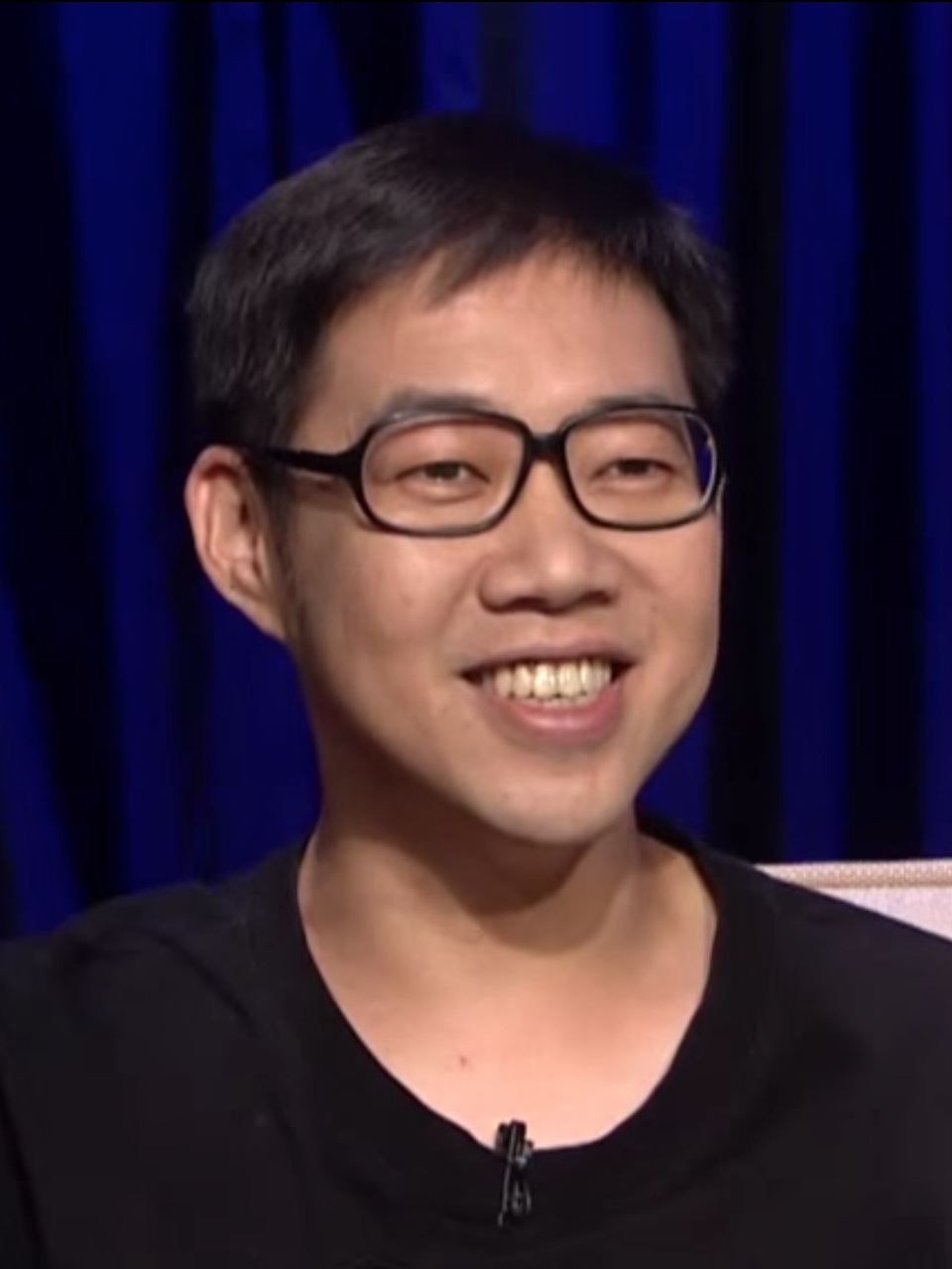
- Lin in 2015
- Born: 1976 (49–50)
- Education: Shih Hsin University (BA); California Institute of the Arts (MFA)
- Spouse: Kimi Hsia (m. 2019)

Thomas Lin Shu-yu (Chinese: 林書宇; born 1976) is a Taiwanese director and screenwriter. After the critical success of his first two features, Winds of September (2008), for which he won Best Original Screenplay at the 45th Golden Horse Awards, and Starry Starry Night (2011), he has been considered a leading filmmaker of his generation. His films often deal with autobiographical elements.

== Early life ==
Lin attended elementary school in Twin Cities, Minnesota, where his father was conducting his doctorate research in American literature. He returned to Hsinchu, Taiwan, during his junior year to attend National Experimental High School, an experimental bilingual high school, despite not knowing any Mandarin.

Lin graduated from the Department of Radio, Television and Film at Shih Hsin University in 1998. Lin later attended the California Institute of the Arts (CalArts), where he studied under Thom Andersen. He graduated with his MFA from CalArts in 2002. His thesis film, Parachute Kids, is about a recent Taiwan to America transplant and his girlfriend, who is moving to Taiwan with her parents. Originally a documentary about undocumented youths, Lin pivoted into narrative after his would-be subjects revealed too much illegal activity. The film was screened at the 21st Vancouver International Film Festival.

== Career ==
After graduation, Lin returned to Taiwan, where he worked as an assistant director for filmmakers like Tsai Ming-liang, Cheng Wen-tang, and Zero Chou. His short The Pain of Others was nominated for a Golden Horse Award in 2005.

Lin made his feature film directorial debut with Winds of September (2008). It's centered around nine high school students' lives in Lin's hometown of Hsinchu, Taiwan. He began writing the script in 2004 with characters loosely inspired by his high school friends. Eric Tsang came on as a producer after his daughter, Taiwanese singer Bowie Tsang, recommended the script to him, after having seen Lin's film The Pain of Others. Lin and co-writer Tsai Tsung-han won Best Original Screenplay at the 45th Golden Horse Awards.

His third feature film, Zinnia Flower (2015), is about two mourners bonding 100 days after their partners' deaths. Lin began writing the screenplay for the film 107 days after his wife died in July 2012. The film premiered at the Taipei Film Festival in July 2015 before opening in Taiwanese cinemas in early October. It was nominated for three awards at the 52nd Golden Horse Awards, including Best Original Screenplay.

His fourth feature film, The Garden of Evening Mists (2019), is an adaptation of the Booker Prize-shortlisted novel of the same name. It is a wartime romance set during and after the Japanese occupation of Malaya about a former Japanese POW who travels to the Cameron Highlands to build a garden for her dead sister. This was Lin's first foreign production. The film was nominated in nine categories at the 56th Golden Horse Awards, including Lin's first nomination for Best Director.

His fifth feature film, Yen and Ai-Lee (2024), is a collaboration with his wife Kimi Hsia and revolves around domestic violence. The film premiered at the 29th Busan International Film Festival, and received eight nominations at the 61st Golden Horse Awards.

His next film Life's a Struggle "宋岳庭传" is a musical biography about Taiwanese rapper Shawn "M80" Sung.

== Style and influence ==
Many of his films feature elements from Lin's life.

Lin cites Taiwanese New Wave Cinema directors Edward Yang and Hou Hsiao-hsien as major influences, in regards to "their spirit and ideology, rather than technique and visual styles." Specifically, Yang's A Brighter Summer Day was impactful on Lin as a teenager, who was the same age as the film's protagonist. Both directors had made a film about their teenage lives and Lin wanted to do the same with his first film, Winds of September (2008).

Lin cites mangaka Mitsuru Adachi's use of empty locations within a manga frame as an influence on Winds of September's use of cross-cutting during the graduation scene. The cross-cutting between empty shots of the school was also economical as they could re-use footage they had shot to test the film.

== Personal life ==
His first wife died in July 2012. He dated actress Kimi Hsia for about three years and they married in 2019. His father is a professor at the National Tsing Hua University.

== Filmography ==
Year	Title	Director	Writer	Notes
1997	The Olfactory System	Yes		short
2002	Parachute Kids	Yes		short
2005	The Pain of Others	Yes	Yes	short
2008	Winds of September	Yes	Yes	co-writer with Tsai Tsung-han
2011	Starry Starry Night	Yes	Yes	
2015	Zinnia Flower	Yes	Yes	co-writer with Liu Wei-jan
2019	The Garden of Evening Mists	Yes	No	
2024	Yen and Ai-Lee	Yes	Yes	
TBD	Life's a Struggle			

== Awards and nominations ==
Year	Award	Category	Nominated work	Result	Notes
2008	45th Golden Horse Awards	Best Original Screenplay	Winds of September	Won	co-winner with Tsai Tsung-han
2012	Beijing College Student Film Festival	Best Director	Starry Starry Night	Nominated	
2012	49th Golden Horse Awards	Best Adapted Screenplay	Starry Starry Night	Nominated	
2015	52nd Golden Horse Awards	Best Original Screenplay	Zinnia Flower	Nominated	
2019	56th Golden Horse Awards	Best Director	The Garden of Evening Mists	Nominated	
2024	61st Golden Horse Awards	Best Original Screenplay	Yen and Ai-Lee	Nominated	
