= Rod Hall =

Rod Hall may refer to:

- Rod Hall (literary agent) (1951–2004), British literary agent
- Rod Hall (racer) (1937–2019), American professional off-road racer
