= The Beachcomber (1954 film) =

- British theatrical poster by Josh Kirby
- Directed by: Muriel Box
- Written by: Sydney Box
- Based on: The Vessel of Wrath by W. Somerset Maugham
- Produced by: Sydney Box; William MacQuitty
- Starring: Donald Sinden; Glynis Johns; Robert Newton; Paul Rogers; Donald Pleasence; Michael Hordern
- Cinematography: Reginald Wyer
- Edited by: Jean Barker
- Music by: Francis Chagrin
- Production company: London Independent Producers
- Distributed by: General Film Distributors; United Artists (US)
- Release date: 10 August 1954
- Running time: 82 minutes
- Country: United Kingdom
- Language: English
- Budget: £171,776

The Beachcomber is a 1954 British comedy drama film directed by Muriel Box starring Donald Sinden, Glynis Johns, Robert Newton, Paul Rogers, Donald Pleasence and Michael Hordern. The film is based on the 1931 short story "The Vessel of Wrath" by W. Somerset Maugham and was adapted by Sydney Box. It was the second screen adaptation of the book following the 1938 film Vessel of Wrath.

== Plot ==
The new British Resident of the Welcome Islands, Ewart Gray, arrives in full uniform by ship, anticipating the excitement of a posting in the tropical Indian Ocean. [This location is fictitious, the real Welcome Islands being in the South Atlantic at the latitude of Tierra del Fuego, and being very far from a tropical paradise: the original story is set in an island in the Alas group off Dutch New Guinea, as it then was.] He is informed that the last Governor had shot himself from "loneliness", which dampens his spirits a little. On landing, he finds his quarters are not ready for him, and he is invited to stay by the local missionary Owen Jones and his sister Martha. He soon finds their company, while friendly, a little overbearing, and returns to stay at his own residence despite it not being finished. That evening, he is visited by the only other European resident of the island, Edward Wilson, known as the "Honourable Ted", who introduces himself and drinks a large amount of Gray's whisky. Despite having been warned that Ted was a scoundrel, Gray soon warms to him, finding him well-spoken and obviously educated.

A year after arriving on the island Gray is disappointed to see Ted arrested and brought up before him in court for encouraging a girl at the mission to steal some money which he then spent on drink before becoming involved in a drunken brawl. Gray breaks with precedent and sentences Ted to three months' hard labour on a neighbouring island. While there, the local headman suffers from appendicitis. Because her brother, who functions as a local doctor as well as running the mission, is unwell, Martha travels out and successfully performs the operation. She nurses the headman back to health, while also tending to a local elephant that had injured its trunk after being attacked by a crocodile. On the way back she travels in a boat with Ted, who has now finished his sentence. She strongly disapproves of Ted, and the fact that he and the crew are drunk on arrack. She is horrified when the propeller fails and they are forced to spend the night on a small desert island. She is convinced that Ted will try and molest her, but to her surprise he leaves her alone all night—except to put some blankets on her to stop her becoming cold.

When they return to the capital she is now slightly infatuated with Ted, in whom she can see signs of goodness. He remains repulsed by her, and ignores her gentle attempts to get to know him better. His drunken behaviour on the island carries on as before, and he is involved in another brawl. This time Gray is forced to sentence him to deportation to Australia. His departure is delayed by a sudden outbreak of cholera which sweeps the islands. With all available hands needed in the capital, only Martha can be spared to go to the northern islands to treat the outbreak there. Because the governor and her brother are worried that the spread of disease might encourage a native rebellion they are hesitant to let her go. Ultimately they agree, provided she takes Ted with her. At first he refuses to help her when he is approached, but later guiltily agrees to join her.

Once they reach the northern islands they discover the inhabitants have become hostile to them, blaming the spread of the disease on the Europeans. However, Martha persuades them to let her help, reminding them of how she saved the life of the headman months before. They assent to her presence, and she and Ted throw themselves into the task of fighting the disease. Slowly they grow extremely fond of each other, and finally embrace. Each has made an emotional journey, Martha from a repressed state to being a more sensually aware woman while Ted has changed from a morally dubious character to being a more upstanding person.

After failing to save the life of a young woman, they are suddenly seized by a mob and threatened with death. Pegged out, they are about to be trampled to death by an elephant, but the animal stops at the last moment, recognizing her as the woman who had nursed its trunk months before. Astonished by this miraculous survival, the native inhabitants let them go. Back in the capital, Martha and Ted marry and he takes up playing the organ to accompany her in the mission. Gray takes some satisfaction from the fact that the number of deaths have been dramatically reduced since the last outbreak of disease and that it should in future be possible to contain and reduce the number of fatalities from the disease.

== Cast ==
- Glynis Johns as Martha Jones
- Robert Newton as Edward Wilson
- Donald Sinden as Ewart Gray
- Paul Rogers as Owen Jones
- Donald Pleasence as Tromp
- Walter Crisham as Vederala
- Michael Hordern as the Headman
- Auric Lorand as Alfred, majordomo
- Ronald Adam as Sir Henry Johnstone
- Jeanne Roland as Amao
- Tony Quinn as ship Captain
- Ah Chong Choy as Wang the barkeep
- Michael Mellinger as medical orderly
- Ronald Lewis as Headman's son

== Production ==
The remake was announced in September 1953. Glynis Johns' casting was announced the following month Her fee was a reported £10,000.

It was the second time Newton had followed Laughton in a film role, the first being Les Misérables (1952). Newton said "When I told Charlie that I was going to play the part he wished me luck. Then he said: 'And when you've made it I'll reissue mine again.' " Newton had been living in Los Angeles but returned to London in January 1954 to make Trilby then The Beachcomber.

The film was shot at Pinewood Studios and on location in Ceylon (now Sri Lanka). The film's sets were designed by the art director George Provis. Ronald Lewis made one of his first film appearances.

Donald Sinden, then a contract star for the Rank Organisation at Pinewood Studios, recalls:

Robert Newton should have been perfect in the part. It is no secret that he was a very heavy drinker and recently, but not for the first time, he had been warned by his doctors that if he did not stop he would more than likely pop off in the very near future. When we began Beachcomber he had been on the wagon for three months and a sorry sight he was: gone were the thrown-back head and the fiery eyes; the jerky gestures made by his arms were now limp and seemed to lack purpose. It was tragic to realise that he had now reached a stage when he relied so totally on alcohol to inject spirit into his performance. He was listless and just moped around the studio, hardly talking to anyone... He confided to me that he was not happy with the film; things were not altogether successful in his private life; he was toying with an idea of doing Shakespeare's Richard III in Australia, but generally his career was not going as well as he could wish... Early one morning I was seated silently in my make-up chair when suddenly the door crashed open. There stood Newton, absolutely plastered, his eyes blazing. He staggered across the room, thrust his face into mine and with slobbering lips and flashing eyes he embarked on the most thrilling rendering I have ever heard of "Now is the winter of our discontent made glorious summer..." ... From that moment he really took off in the film, but sadly there were only a few days to go—and sadder still, that last bout of drinking was followed shortly after by his death.

Filming was completed by March 1954.

After filming, Newton said that because the original "was filmed so long ago I don't feel that any of Laughton's mannerisms have crept into my portrayal. In fact, it never worried me at all. When one asks how it feels to do a picture revival, I always wonder why they bother doing them again – except in this instance. I did enjoy playing the character. As written by Maugham it's always been rich, colourful and amusing."

Filming and post production was difficult, forcing Sydney Box to go to Rank Films for financing and distribution. Rank's head of production Earl St. John demanded substantial cuts to the final film.

== Reception ==
Variety called it "well adapted".

The Monthly Film Bulletin wrote: "The traditional – but none the less entertaining – story is presented with no imagination and with surprising tastelessness – the utmost fun is extracted from the follies of temperance and (most comical of all, apparently) reading the Bible. Beside these, the mere absurdity of the badly faked scenes of Glynis Johns (a highly unsuitable person for such a job) bandaging the elephant's trunk, is negligible. ... Francis Chagrin's music is importunate; the locations and colour are disappointing."

The New York Times review called it a "competently wrought Technicolor remake of W. Somerset Maugham's 'Vessel of Wrath'" that did not measure up to the earlier 1938 adaptation which featured "inspired characterizations by Charles Laughton and Elsa Lanchester".

The film received two stars out of five in the Radio Times: Guide to Films, which praised the performance of Robert Newton as Ted and his homage to the earlier portrayal of the role by Charles Laughton in 1938.
