= Rod Hall (literary agent) =

Roderick Thomas Berringer (Rod) Hall (27 April 1951 – 21 May 2004) was a British literary agent who represented several successful writers.

== Biography ==
Hall was born in Sussex, England. His parents ran a fruit farm.

He was educated at Priory Grammar School, Lewes and studied English at the University of Edinburgh graduating with a master's degree in 1974. While at the university he established the first ever gay and lesbian society.

Having worked for London agency AP Watt, he established the Rod Hall Agency Limited in 1997.

Hall was found dead, with multiple stab wounds, chained to a radiator, in his Southwark apartment. In 2005, Usman Durrani, a 20-year-old student at the University of Edinburgh was convicted of Hall's murder and sentenced to life in prison.

Following his death, the films Driving Lessons and Imagine Me & You as well as the stage play Mercury Fur were dedicated to him.

== Clients ==
Hall's agency represented more than 60 writers, including:

- Simon Beaufoy (wrote The Full Monty and Slumdog Millionaire)
- Jeremy Brock (wrote Mrs. Brown)
- Lee Hall (wrote Billy Elliot)
- Liz Lochhead (Scottish poet)
- Martin McDonagh (playwright)
- Philip Ridley (playwright, screenwriter, director)
- Richard Smith (wrote Trauma)
- Simon Nye (wrote the television show Men Behaving Badly)
