= Myrmidon Books =

British publishing company

- Founded: 2006; 20 years ago
- Founder: Ed Handyside
- Country of origin: United Kingdom
- Headquarters location: Newcastle upon Tyne
- Publication types: Books
- Official website: www.myrmidonbooks.com

Myrmidon Books is a UK publisher of literary and genre fiction founded in 2006 by Ed Handyside. The company is based in Newcastle upon Tyne in the United Kingdom. The Myrmidon book The Garden of Evening Mists, by Tan Twan Eng, was shortlisted for the 2012 Man Booker Prize.

Their catalogue comprises work in a relatively broad range of fictional styles, from high literature to comedic science fiction such as Toby Frost's Space Captain Smith series.

== Selected authors ==
- Brian O'Connell
- Clio Gray
- Colin Ingram
- David Morrell
