= Richard Smith (screenwriter) =

British screenwriter and film director

Richard Smith is a British screenwriter and film director. He wrote Trauma, starring Colin Firth and Mena Suvari, and half-hour film, Leonard.

== Biography ==
A graduate in scriptwriting from the University of Salford, he won a BAFTA Scotland award in 2002. His films have premiered at Sundance and Edinburgh Film Festival, and appeared at many others the world over. His work focuses on the psychology of loneliness, human failure and the ability/inability for people to overcome themselves. He's represented by The Rod Hall Agency in London.

His films include a feature version of Leonard (with Kinetic Arts/Crab Apple Films), an adaptation of Anthony Holden's Big Deal (with Celador) and TV movie Auntie Rita (with Scottish Media Group).

== Filmography ==
Year	Title	Notes
2002	Leonard	Example
2004	Trauma	As writer
2006	Mono	as writer/director
2019	The Garden of Evening Mists	as screenwriter, based on the eponymous novel

== Awards ==
Leonard

- The Audience Award at the 2002 Clermont Ferrand Short Film Festival
- The Organization Prize at the 2002 Algarve Film Festival, the award for Best Single Drama at the 2002 Mental Health Media Awards
- Best Fiction at the 2002 Tehran Festival.
