= Ah King =

Collection of Short Stories

- First edition cover
- Author: W. Somerset Maugham
- Genre: Short story collection
- Publisher: Heinemann
- Publication date: September 1933

Ah King is a collection of short stories by W. Somerset Maugham set in the Federated Malay States and elsewhere in Southeast Asia during the 1920s. It was first published by the UK publishing house Heinemann in September 1933; the first American edition was published on November 8 of the same year by Doubleday Doran, New York. The book was published in French translation as La Femme dans la Jungle (1935) and in Spanish as Ah King, mi criado china (1946). A Chinese translation by Ye Zun under the title 阿金 : 六篇小说 (Ah Jin: Liu pian xiaoshuo) was published by Zhejiang Literature and Art Publishing House in 2018.

Like The Casuarina Tree, Ah King was loosely based on Maugham's experiences traveling with his companion Gerald Haxton in the region for six months in 1921 and four months in 1925. The short stories collected in both volumes had appeared previously in magazines.

== Contents ==
1. Footprints in the Jungle
2. The Door of Opportunity
3. The Vessel of Wrath
4. The Book-Bag
5. The Back of Beyond
6. Neil MacAdam

== Explanation of the title ==
In the preface to the collection, Maugham recounts how he engaged a servant in Singapore to assist him in his travels. Ah King, a twenty-year old man, accompanied him for six months. When Maugham was about to depart for Europe and the time came for them to part ways, Ah King surprised the author by bursting into tears (having shown little sign of emotion previously on the journey), leading Maugham to dedicate the volume to him.

== Adaptations ==
The short story "Neil MacAdam" was dramatized for the stage in 1941 by Paulo Braga as O Fruto Proibido.
