= Robert Newton =

English actor (1905–1956)

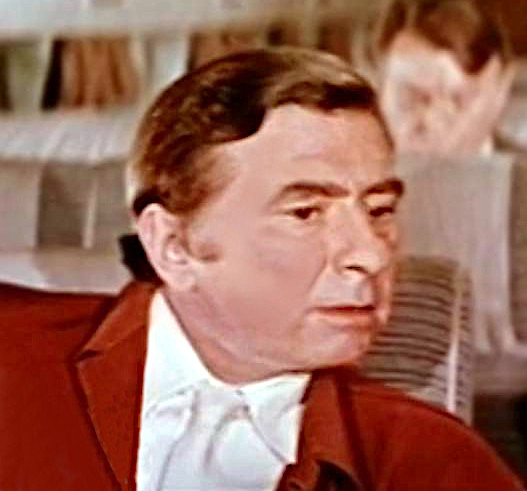
- Newton in The High and the Mighty (1954)
- Born: Robert Guy Newton; 1 June 1905; Shaftesbury, Dorset, England
- Died: 25 March 1956 (aged 50); Beverly Hills, California, U.S.
- Resting place: Cremated; ashes scattered in the waters of Mount's Bay, Cornwall
- Occupation: Actor
- Years active: 1923–1956
- Spouses: Petronella Walton (m. 1929; div. 1935); Annie McLean (m. 1936; div. 1945); Natalie Newhouse (m. 1947; div. 1952); Vera Budnik (m. 1952)
- Children: Sally 1930-2001, Nicholas b.1950 & Kim b.1953
- Military career
- Branch: Royal Navy
- Service years: 1940–1942 (United Kingdom)
- Rank: Ordinary Seaman
- Unit: HMS Britomart
- Conflicts: Second World War

Robert Guy Newton (1 June 1905 – 25 March 1956) was an English actor. Along with Errol Flynn, Newton was one of the more popular actors among the male juvenile audience of the 1940s and early 1950s, especially with British boys. Known for his hard-living life, he was cited as a role model by the actor Oliver Reed and the Who's drummer Keith Moon.

Beginning his career in theatre in the 1920s, Newton appeared in numerous plays in the West End, including Bitter Sweet by Noël Coward. In 1939 he was Horatio in Hamlet at the Old Vic theatre opposite Laurence Olivier's Prince Hamlet. After serving in the Royal Navy during the Second World War, he had his major break on screen playing the lead in This Happy Breed (1944) and starring in Olivier's version of Henry V (1944). These appearances saw British exhibitors vote him the 10th most popular British film star of 1944.

Newton is best remembered for his portrayal of the feverish-eyed Long John Silver in the 1950 RKO-Disney British adaptation of Treasure Island, the film that became the standard for screen portrayals of historical pirates. He starred as Edward Teach (Blackbeard) in Blackbeard the Pirate in 1952 and Long John Silver again in the 1954 film of the same title, which spawned a television series in the mid-1950s. Born in Dorset in the West Country of England and growing up in Cornwall near Land's End, Newton exaggerated his West Country accent for his pirate roles and is credited with popularising the stereotypical "pirate speech". Newton has become the "patron saint" of the annual International Talk Like a Pirate Day.

== Early life ==
Robert Guy Newton was born on 1 June 1905 in Shaftesbury, Dorset, a son of the landscape painter Algernon Newton, R.A. He lived with his family in Lamorna near Penzance, Cornwall, from 1912 to 1918. He attended St. Petroc's preparatory school in Bude, where he won a shooting competition in 1916, and then Exeter School and St. Bartholomew's School in Newbury, Berkshire.

== Early career ==
His acting career began at the age of 16 at the Birmingham Repertory Theatre in 1921. He appeared in many repertory shows until he went to Canada where he worked on a cattle ranch for a year.

He returned to England and performed in many plays in the West End of London, including Bitter Sweet by Noël Coward, The Letter with Gladys Cooper, and Her Cardboard Lover with Tallulah Bankhead. He also appeared in Private Lives on Broadway, taking over the role from his friend Laurence Olivier. From 1932 to 1934, he was the manager of the Shilling Theatre in Fulham, London. He had a small role in the film Reunion (1932).

Newton was put under contract to Alexander Korda who cast him in small roles in the cinema films Fire Over England (1937), Dark Journey (1937), Farewell Again (1937) and The Squeaker (1937). He also had a part as Cassius in the abandoned version of I, Claudius and in 21 Days (shot in 1937, released 1940). Newton was borrowed by 20th Century Fox for The Green Cockatoo (1937). Newton had a good role supporting Charles Laughton in Vessel of Wrath (1938). He had another strong part in Yellow Sands (1939) and had his first film lead in Dead Men are Dangerous (1939). He made another with Laughton, Jamaica Inn (1939), playing the romantic male lead, directed by Alfred Hitchcock. In 1939, he played Horatio to Laurence Olivier's Hamlet at the Old Vic, in a production that included Alec Guinness and Michael Redgrave. Newton kept busy as a film actor, appearing in Poison Pen (1939) and Hell's Cargo (1939).

Newton continued primarily as a supporting actor in films, appearing in Gaslight (1940), Busman's Honeymoon (1940), Bulldog Sees It Through (1940), Channel Incident (1940) and Major Barbara (1941), directed by Gabriel Pascal from the play by George Bernard Shaw. Newton got another chance as a star in Hatter's Castle (1942), opposite Deborah Kerr and James Mason. He consolidated his status by playing opposite Anna Neagle in the Amy Johnson biopic They Flew Alone (1942), playing Jim Mollison.

== Military service ==
Newton enlisted in the Royal Navy in 1940, and saw active service in the rank of an Able Seaman on board HMS Britomart, which fought as an escort ship on several Russian convoys during World War II. After one and a half years in the Royal Navy he was medically discharged in 1942.

== Return to acting ==
On resuming his film career, Newton played the lead in This Happy Breed (1944), a role played on stage by Noël Coward. Directed by David Lean, it was a huge hit. So too was the Laurence Olivier version of Henry V (1944), in which Newton played Ancient Pistol. These appearances helped British exhibitors vote him the 10th most popular British film star of 1944. During the war, he starred in the West End in No Orchids for Miss Blandish, which was a hit.

Newton had the star role in a thriller Night Boat to Dublin (1946), then had a showy cameo role in Odd Man Out (1947); this performance later was immortalised in Harold Pinter's play Old Times. He stayed in leads for Temptation Harbour (1947) and Snowbound (1948). Lean cast him as Bill Sikes in Oliver Twist (1948), a huge success critically and commercially.

== Hollywood ==
He then made a series of films with Hollywood stars and/or financing: Kiss the Blood Off My Hands (1948), a film noir with Joan Fontaine and Burt Lancaster; Obsession (1949), a thriller directed by Edward Dmytryk, playing a cuckolded husband who exacts revenge on his wife. He played Long John Silver in Walt Disney's version of Treasure Island (1950), shot in the UK, with Bobby Driscoll and directed by Byron Haskin. Less well known is Waterfront (1950) in which Richard Burton appeared in his third film.

His final performance on stage was in the 1950 production of Gaslight with Rosamund John at the Vaudeville Theatre.

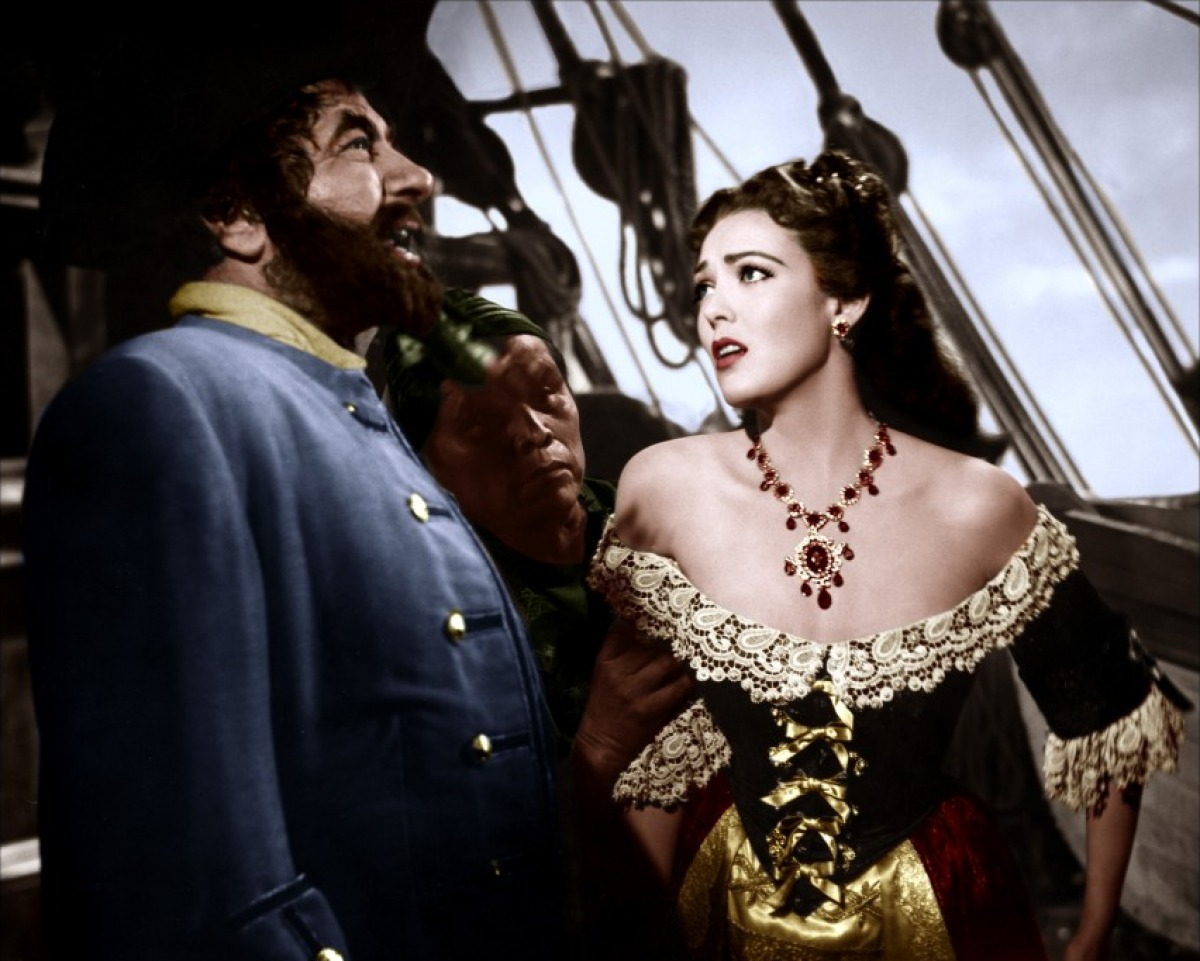
Newton and Linda Darnell in Blackbeard the Pirate (1952)

Treasure Island's success prompted Newton to return to Hollywood. He was one of several British actors in Soldiers Three (1951), an Imperial adventure tale. He returned to Britain for Tom Brown's Schooldays (1951) to play Thomas Arnold, then was cast by 20th Century Fox as Javert in their version of Les Misérables (1952). In 1951, he was voted the sixth most popular British star in Britain.

Gabriel Pascal gave him the role of Ferrovius in Androcles and the Lion (1952), another Shaw adaptation. It was made by RKO who cast Newton in the title role of Blackbeard the Pirate (1952).

Fox asked him back for The Desert Rats (1953) opposite Richard Burton and James Mason, playing a drunken school teacher who discovers bravery during World War II. He was one of several names in an aeroplane disaster movie The High and the Mighty (1954). He was in an episode of Alfred Hitchcock Presents playing a tramp blackmailing a business man.

Back in Britain, Newton was given the lead in The Beachcomber (1954), a remake of Vessels of Wrath, this time in the part originally played by Charles Laughton. He again played Long John Silver in an Australian-made film, Long John Silver (1954). It was shot at Pagewood Studios, Sydney, and directed by Byron Haskin, who had directed Treasure Island. The company went on to make a 26-episode 1955 TV series, The Adventures of Long John Silver, in which Newton also starred. Earlier in 1954, he quit the film Svengali for personal reasons to be replaced by Sir Donald Wolfit which left him open to a legal action while filming in Australia in 1954.

His last screen appearance was as Inspector Fix in Around the World in 80 Days (1956) opposite David Niven, Shirley MacLaine and the Mexican star Cantinflas. It won the Academy Award for Best Picture in 1956.

== Personal life ==
Newton married four times and had three children. In 1951, Newton was accused by his third wife, Natalie, of kidnapping their son, Nicholas, and bringing him to the United States against her wishes. They were divorced in 1952 and custody of Nicholas was granted to Natalie.

== Death ==
Newton suffered in the latter part of his life from chronic alcoholism and died on 25 March 1956 at age 50, following a heart attack in Beverly Hills, California. His body was cremated, and there is a plaque in Westwood Village Memorial Park Cemetery in Los Angeles in his memory. Years later his ashes were scattered into the south coast of Cornwall in Mount's Bay, near Lamorna in Cornwall, where he had spent his childhood.

== Filmography ==
| Year | Title | Role | Notes |
|---|---|---|---|
| 1924 | The Tremarne Case | | |
| 1932 | Reunion | | |
| 1937 | Fire Over England | Don Pedro | |
| 1937 | Dark Journey | Officer of U-boat | |
| 1937 | Farewell Again | Jim Carter | |
| 1937 | The Squeaker | Larry Graeme | |
| 1937 | The Green Cockatoo | Dave Connor | |
| 1937 | I, Claudius | Cassius, Captain of Caligula's Guard | |
| 1938 | Vessel of Wrath | the Controleur | |
| 1938 | Yellow Sands | Joe Varwell | |
| 1939 | Dead Men are Dangerous | Aylmer Franklyn | |
| 1939 | Jamaica Inn | James 'Jem' Trehearne - Sir Humphrey's Gang | |
| 1939 | Poison Pen | Sam Hurrin | |
| 1939 | Hell's Cargo | Commander Tomasou | |
| 1940 | 21 Days | Tolley | |
| 1940 | Gaslight | Vincent Ullswater | |
| 1940 | Busman's Honeymoon | Frank Crutchley | |
| 1940 | Bulldog Sees It Through | Watkins | |
| 1940 | Channel Incident | Tanner | Short film |
| 1941 | Major Barbara | Bill Walker | |
| 1942 | Hatter's Castle | James Brodie | |
| 1942 | They Flew Alone | Jim Mollison | |
| 1942 | A Battle for a Bottle | | Short film |
| 1944 | This Happy Breed | Frank Gibbons | |
| 1944 | Henry V | Ancient Pistol | |
| 1946 | Night Boat to Dublin | Captain David Grant | |
| 1947 | Odd Man Out | Lukey | |
| 1947 | Temptation Harbour | Bert Mallison | |
| 1948 | Snowbound | Derek Engles | |
| 1948 | Oliver Twist | Bill Sykes | |
| 1948 | Kiss the Blood Off My Hands | Harry Carter | |
| 1949 | Obsession | Dr. Clive Riordan | |
| 1950 | Treasure Island | Long John Silver | |
| 1950 | Waterfront | Peter McCabe | |
| 1951 | Soldiers Three | Private Bill Sykes | |
| 1951 | Tom Brown's Schooldays | Dr. Thomas Arnold | |
| 1952 | Les Misérables | Etienne Javert | |
| 1952 | Androcles and the Lion | Ferrovius | |
| 1952 | Blackbeard the Pirate | Edward Teach / Blackbeard | |
| 1953 | The Desert Rats | Tom Bartlett | |
| 1954 | The High and the Mighty | Gustave Pardee | |
| 1954 | The Beachcomber | Edward 'Honorable Ted' Wilson | |
| 1954 | Long John Silver | Long John Silver | |
| 1956 | Around the World in 80 Days | Inspector Fix | Posthumous release |

== Television ==
| Year | Title | Role | Notes |
|---|---|---|---|
| 1954 | The Adventures of Long John Silver | Long John Silver | |
| 1956 | Alfred Hitchcock Presents | Peter J. Goodfellow | Episode: ""The Derelicts" |

=== Box-office rankings ===
For several years, Newton was voted by exhibitors as among the most popular British stars at the local box office:

- 9th most popular British star in 1947
- 5th most popular British star in 1950 (10th most popular star overall)
- 7th most popular British star in 1951

== Radio appearances ==
| Year | Program | Episode/source |
|---|---|---|
| 1953 | Family Theatre | Namgay Doola |
