= Channel Incident =

1940 British film by Anthony Asquith

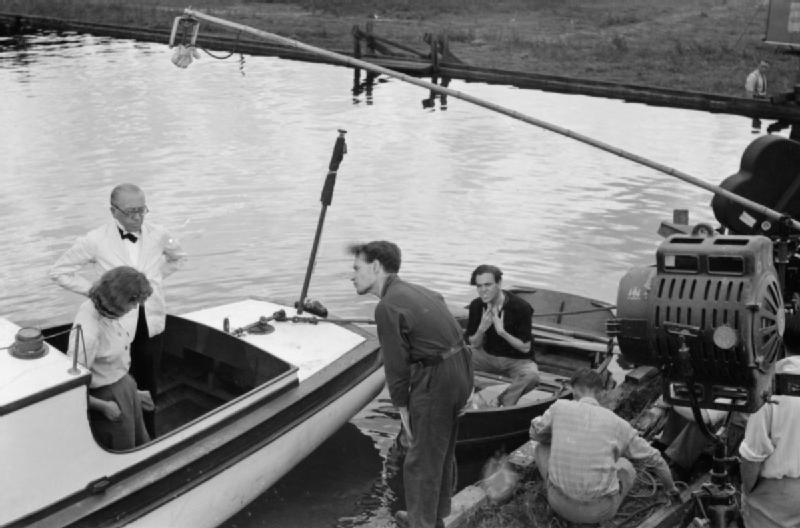
- Anthony Asquith (centre) directs Peggy Ashcroft and Gordon Harker, with Kenneth Griffith in the smaller boat.
- Directed by: Anthony Asquith
- Screenplay by: Dallas Bower
- Story by: "Bartimeus"
- Produced by: Anthony Asquith
- Starring: Peggy Ashcroft; Gordon Harker; Robert Newton
- Cinematography: Bernard Knowles
- Edited by: Ralph Kemplen
- Production company: Denham and Pinewood Studios
- Release date: 1940
- Running time: 9 minutes
- Country: United Kingdom
- Language: English

Channel Incident is a 1940 British short black and white drama-documentary propaganda film directed by Anthony Asquith and starring Peggy Ashcroft, Gordon Harker, Robert Newton and Kenneth Griffith. It was written by Dallas Bower from a story credited to "Bartimeus" and produced by Asquith for the Ministry of Information.

== Scenario ==
The film combines documentary footage with acted scenes and depicts the female owner of a yacht, the Wanderer, heading across the English Channel to help evacuate British troops from Dunkirk. Other ships referenced, as the larger vessels to which the civilian small craft are ferrying troops lifted from the beaches, are the SS Princess Louise, SS Blackburn Rovers and Devonia.

== Cast ==
- Peggy Ashcroft as She
- Gordon Harker as Ferris
- Robert Newton as Tanner
- Kenneth Griffith as Johnny
