= Winds of September =

2008 Taiwanese film by Tom Lin Shu-yu

- Theatrical release poster
- Traditional Chinese: 九降風
- Literal meaning: Nine Falling Wind
- Hanyu Pinyin: Jiǔ Jiàng Fēng
- Directed by: Tom Lin Shu-yu
- Written by: Tsai Tsung-han; Tom Lin
- Produced by: Yeh Jufeng; Eric Tsang
- Starring: Chang Chea; Jennifer Chu; Sheng Wei-nian; Rhydian Vaughan; Wang Po-chieh
- Cinematography: Fisher Yu
- Edited by: Chen Hsiao-tong
- Music by: Blaire Yo
- Distributed by: Atom Cinema
- Release date: 6 June 2008
- Running time: 107 minutes
- Country: Taiwan
- Language: Mandarin

Winds of September (Chinese: 九降風) is a 2008 Taiwanese film. Set in 1996 in Hsinchu, it focuses on a gang of teenage boys who drink, smoke and gamble, and the relationships between them. It broke a number of taboos in Taiwanese filmmaking, including showing the group skinny dipping.

Directed and co-written by Tom Lin Shu-yu, the film was praised for its good acting and realistic themes. It was screened at the 2008 Toronto International Film Festival, and the Tokyo International Film Festival in 2008.

Eric Tsang produced the Hong Kong adaptation, High Noon (2008), by Heiward Mak.

== Cast ==
- Rhydian Vaughan
- Chang Chieh
- Jennifer Chu
- Wang Po-chieh
- Lin Chi-tai
- Nelson Shen
- Mao Di
- Teresa Daley
- Eric Tsang
- Lawrence Ko
- Esther Liu as Hsieh Meng-lun
- Jag Huang as Police officer

== Awards ==
The film was awarded Best Film at the Asian New Talent Awards of the 11th Shanghai International Film Festival in June 2008. It was also nominated for the Grand Prize at the 10th Taipei Film Awards.

It won Best Original Screenplay at the 45th Golden Horse Awards.

== See also ==
- Nudity in film (East Asian cinema since 1929)
- You Are the Apple of My Eye (2011) — Taiwanese coming-of-age high school film in 1990s Taiwan loosely based on the director's life
