= Vessel of Wrath =

- Directed by: Erich Pommer
- Written by: Bartlett Cormack; B. Van Thal (uncredited scenario)
- Based on: the short story "The Vessel of Wrath" by W. Somerset Maugham
- Produced by: Charles Laughton; Erich Pommer
- Starring: Charles Laughton; Elsa Lanchester
- Cinematography: Jules Kruger
- Edited by: Robert Hamer; Jean Barker (uncredited)
- Music by: Richard Addinsell
- Production company: Mayflower Pictures
- Distributed by: Associated British Film Distributors (UK); Paramount Pictures (US)
- Release date: 4 March 1938
- Running time: 92 minutes
- Country: United Kingdom
- Language: English
- Budget: £103,686

Vessel of Wrath is a 1938 British film directed by Erich Pommer, produced by Pommer, and starring Charles Laughton and Elsa Lanchester. It was based on the 1931 Somerset Maugham short story "The Vessel of Wrath". The film is also known as The Beachcomber in the US. It was produced by Pommer and Laughton's independent film production company, Mayflower Pictures.

== Plot ==
Englishman Ginger Ted is a "dissolute beachcomber" living in a tropical Dutch colonial possession somewhere in the Indian Ocean with his beloved dog Dudley. When a ship makes its monthly visit, Ted has to outrun a mob of creditors to obtain his remittance cheque from the Controleur, the colonial governor. However, his friend makes him pay his debts, leaving him only a little.

Ginger then gets Lia to sneak out of the classroom of Martha Jones. The homesick man tells Lia of England. Martha has him arrested. He is sentenced to three months on the road gang, but that does not satisfy the puritanical pair of Martha Jones and her missionary brother. They want him deported, but Ginger is the Controleur's only real local friend, so he sends him to alcohol-free Agor Island to try to reform him.

When Martha insists on going to another island to attend to a medical emergency, the Controleur sends his sergeant along as an escort, with secret orders to pick up Ginger on the way back. When their boat's propeller strikes a reef, they have to spend the night on the nearest island while repairs are made. Martha finds it rather traumatic at first, but then unexpectedly begins to warm to Ginger. After Dr. Jones later thanks Ginger for not taking advantage of his sister, Ginger knocks the Controleur out when the latter laughs at him.

While Ginger is passed out drunk on the beach, Martha cleans his shack. When Ginger returns, he demands she leave.

Then typhoid breaks out on one of the other islands. the Controleur asks Ginger to accompany Dr. Jones to help inoculate the natives; Ginger refuses at first, then reluctantly agrees. However, when Jones is overcome by a flareup of malaria, Martha insists on taking his place. Ginger backs out, but changes his mind after she starts crying.

When they reach the village, they discover that the residents believe the disease is the result of abandoning their old religion. Albert, the headman and a former Christian convert, warns them to leave. Martha insists on confronting the natives, but Ginger drags her away before anything happens.

The headman's wife brings her sick child to the pair. Martha inoculates her that night. When the headman demands his child back, Ginger sends him away. Ominous drumming starts. Facing imminent attack, Ginger tells Martha about how he wanted to marry a barmaid and run a pub, though he was the son of the local vicar; in turn, she tells him her father drank himself to death. Then the child recovers, and the danger is over.

The pair marry and return to England to manage a pub, though Ginger gives up drinking entirely.

== Cast ==
- Charles Laughton as Ginger Ted [Edward C. Wilson]
- Elsa Lanchester as Martha Jones
- Robert Newton as The Controleur [Gruyter]. Newton played Edward Wilson in the 1954 adaptation of The Beachcomber.
- Tyrone Guthrie as Owen Jones, M.D.
- Eliot Makeham as The Clerk
- Dolly Mollinger as Lia
- D. A. Ward as The Chieftain [Albert]
- J. Solomon as The Sergeant

== Reception ==
Kinematograph Weekly reported the film did well at the British box office in August 1938.

Pauline Kael gave the film a very positive review, calling it a "charming, neglected romantic comedy" in which both Laughton and Lanchester are "wonderful".

The New York Times review of the second film adaptation, starring Robert Newton, found it less entertaining than its predecessor, which was praised as a "vigorous comedy and a thing of film beauty" with "inspired characterizations by Charles Laughton and Elsa Lanchester".
