= The Garden of Evening Mists =

2011 novel by Malaysian novelist Tan Twan Eng

- Author: Tan Twan Eng
- Language: English
- Publisher: Myrmidon Books
- Publication date: November 2011
- Publication place: Malaysia
- Pages: 448 pages
- ISBN: 1905802498
- Preceded by: The Gift of Rain (2007)

The Garden of Evening Mists is the second English-language novel by Malaysian novelist Tan Twan Eng, first published in November 2011. The book follows protagonist Teoh Yun Ling, who was a prisoner of the Japanese during the World War II, and later became a judge overseeing war crimes cases. Seeking after the war to create a garden in memory of her sister, who was imprisoned with her but did not survive, she ends up serving as an apprentice to a Japanese gardener in Cameron Highlands for several months during the Malayan Emergency. As the story begins, years later, she is trying to make sense of her life and experiences.

The novel takes place during three different time periods: the late 1980s, when the main character returns to the Japanese garden, Yugiri, of her apprenticeship and begins to write her memoir; the early 1950s, when the main events of the novel took place; and World War II, which provides the backdrop for the story.

Critical reception for the book was generally favourable. It was shortlisted for the Booker Prize, and awarded the Man Asian Literary Prize and the Walter Scott Prize for Historical Fiction. It was adapted into a feature film by HBO Asia in partnership with three other production companies and released in 2019.

== Synopsis ==
Newly retired Supreme Court Judge Teoh Yun Ling returns to the Cameron Highlands of Malaya, where she had spent a few months as an apprentice to the Japanese gardener she had hoped would design a memorial garden for her sister, Teoh Yun Hong. Oncoming aphasia is forcing Yun Ling to deal with unsettled business from her past while she is still able to remember. The gardener, Nakamura Aritomo, had been Emperor Hirohito's gardener, but relocated to Malaya after a falling-out and spent years designing and building his own garden there, named Yugiri. Later, he disappears without a trace in the highland mountains. Reliving her memories of Aritomo and her time there, Yun Ling begins writing her memoir, and meets with Japanese professor Yoshikawa Tatsuji, who is writing a book about the life and works of Aritomo.

During the Japanese occupation of Malaya, Yun Ling and her older sister Yun Hong had been imprisoned in a Japanese civilian internment camp where Yun Hong was forced to become a "comfort woman" for Japanese soldiers. Yun Hong perishes in the chaos and violence of the end of the occupation, and after the war, Yun Ling wants to fulfill a promise she made to her sister: to build a Japanese garden at their home in Kuala Lumpur. She travels to the highlands to visit old family friend Magnus Pretorius, an expatriate Afrikaner tea farmer whose farm bordered Aritomo's garden, and to seek an audience with Aritomo. Aritomo refuses to design the garden Yun Ling wants to build, but unexpectedly proposes to take her on as an apprentice, so that she can later design and build her sister's memorial garden herself. Despite her bitter attitude toward the Japanese, Yun Ling agrees to the apprenticeship.

During Yun Ling's conversations with Tatsuji, following her return to Yugiri years later, it is revealed that Aritomo was involved in a covert Japanese program during the war to hide looted treasures from occupied territories. The rumours of this so-called "Golden Lily" program were widespread, and Magnus was killed trying to save his family from the Communist guerillas who came looking for the treasure.

Aritomo had never talked about the treasure to Yun Ling, but gradually it becomes clear that he might have left a clue to its location. He and Yun Ling had become close during her apprenticeship; both were carrying deep secrets and pain that the other became uniquely capable of touching. With Yun Ling's permission, Aritomo created a complex horimono tattoo on her back. It now appears this tattoo might contain a map to the location of the treasure. Yun Ling decides that, before she dies, she must ensure that no one will be able to get their hands on her body or the map. In the meantime, she sets out to restore Aritomo's now neglected and overgrown garden.

== Main characters ==
- Teoh Yun Ling — The main character, and first-person narrator of the novel. Yun Ling was the only survivor from her internment camp, and still suffers survivor guilt for not being able to save her sister. She goes to find Aritomo to learn how to build a Japanese garden in memory of her sister.
- Nakamura Aritomo — At one time the gardener of Emperor Hirohito, Aritomo is fired due a dispute over a garden design with a Japanese notable. After resettling in Malaya to work on his own garden, he continues to work with the Japanese government to save locals from internment. He also collaborates with the Communist guerillas to protect the garden and its neighbours from attack. In addition to being a skilled gardener and artist, Aritomo also practises other Zen arts, such as archery and the tea ceremony.
- Magnus Pretorius — An expatriate from Transvaal, Magnus settled in the Cameron Highlands of Malaya to grow tea, and married a local woman. He fought in the Second Boer War, where he lost an eye.
- Yoshikawa Tatsuji — A Japanese historian who has attracted negative attention in his homeland for trying to throw light on his country's war crimes. During the war he was a Kamikaze pilot who was supposed to go on a suicide mission, but was saved by his lover and commanding officer.
- Frederik Pretorius — Magnus's nephew and heir. He has a short affair with Yun Ling before she becomes Aritomo's lover.
- Yun Hong — Yun Ling's older sister, who was forced to become a comfort woman to the Japanese soldiers at the internment camp. During a childhood visit to Japan, she became enamoured of Japanese gardens, and used memories of the gardens to help herself and her sister survive the physical and mental traumas of the camp.
- Emily — Malaysian-Chinese woman who falls in love with Magnus and marries him.

== Themes ==
Taking place over three different periods of time, the novel deals with a number of historical issues. The Japanese occupation of Malaya is the backdrop of both later time periods. The central narrative of Yun Ling and Aritomo's relationship plays out against the backdrop of the post-war Malayan Emergency. Finally, as Yun Ling narrates the story in her present, we are in the age of independent Malaysia. The various characters represent different attitudes towards colonialism. Yun Ling – a Straits Chinese – downplays the importance of nationality: "Old countries are dying...and new ones being born. It doesn't matter where one's ancestors came from."(Ch. 5) Magnus, meanwhile, sustains memories from South Africa under British rule, and flies a Transvaal flag from the top of his house. His sister died in a concentration camp, where he suspects she was murdered by the British.(Ch. 4) Tatsuji carries post-colonial guilt for the actions of his nation during the war, and tries to apologise to Yun Ling for the atrocities she has endured at his country's hands, but she replies that "[y]our apology is meaningless."(Ch. 13)

A central theme in the novel is the braveness of women against men tyranny (Nash). The book opens with a quote from historian Richard Holmes, wherein he notes that while the ancient Greeks had a goddess for memory, Mnemosyne, there was none for forgetting. "Yet there should be, as they are twin sisters..."(Ch. 1) One reviewer observed: "Yun Ling's independent spirit and her anger seep like ink-stains into the narrative, but its distilled essence is a quieter appraisal of the dichotomy of memory, its treacherous failures, its cruel conveniences, its fadeout and deliverance." Memory is also strongly tied to guilt, particularly survivor guilt; Yun Ling wonders "[w]hy did she survive and her sister perish?".

== Critical reception ==
Critical reviews of The Garden of Evening Mists were mostly favourable. The Independent's Boyd Tonkin wrote that "Tan writes with breath-catching poise and grace." He appreciated the combination of "action-packed, end-of-empire storytelling" and Tan's effort to "capture stillness on paper." Meanwhile, Dominique Browning, writing for The Daily Telegraph, described Aritomo as "a fascinating character", and found the book "a strong, quiet novel." Manasi Subramaniam of the Asian Review of Books found the ending "incredibly satisfying," and commented on the writing's "lush beauty and artistry of a Japanese garden." The Guardian's Kapka Kassabova noted that "[i]t is impossible to resist the opening sentence" of the novel: "On a mountain above the clouds once lived a man who had been the gardener of the Emperor of Japan."

On 25 July 2012, the book was longlisted for the Booker Prize, and on 11 September it was shortlisted.

On 14 March 2013, it won the Man Asian Literary Prize.

On 14 June 2013, it won the Walter Scott Prize for Historical Fiction.

The book was one of eight finalists for the International Dublin Literary Award (2014).

== Film adaptation ==
In October 2014, it was announced that the novel would be adapted into a feature-length film by Malaysian film company Astro Shaw in collaboration with HBO Asia and the National Film Development Corporation Malaysia. Taiwanese director Tom Lin Shu-yu directed the film and the script was written by Scottish screenwriter Richard Smith. The cast includes Lee Sin-je, Hiroshi Abe, Sylvia Chang, David Oakes, Julian Sands and John Hannah.

The film was released on 29 November 2019 in Taiwan, and 26 December 2019 in Hong Kong, and 16 January 2020 in Malaysia, Brunei and Singapore.
