= The Vessel of Wrath =

1931 short story by W. Somerset Maugham

"The Vessel of Wrath" is a short story by W. Somerset Maugham. Written in 1931 it first appeared in the April 1931 edition of Hearst's International Cosmopolitan (see Stott, 1973). Maugham often introduced short stories as a contribution to periodicals and then later included them in books or collected editions. In 1933 "The Vessel of Wrath" was included in his book Ah King.

The story has been adapted for film and television at least four times:

- The 1938 film Vessel of Wrath, released in the U.S. as The Beachcomber, starred Charles Laughton as Ginger Ted, Elsa Lanchester as Miss Jones, Robert Newton as the Contrôleur, and Tyrone Guthrie as Reverend Jones.
- The 1954 film, The Beachcomber, featured Robert Newton as Ginger Ted, Glynis Johns as Miss Jones, Donald Sinden as the Resident, and Paul Rogers as Reverend Jones. The location was transferred from the Dutch-colonised Alas Islands to the fictitious British-colonised Welcome Islands, with Donald Sinden as the Resident.
- A 1970 television production starred James Booth as Ginger Ted, Siân Phillips as Miss Jones, Ronald Lacey as the Contrôleur, and John Glyn-Jones as Reverend Jones.
- A 1980 television production titled Wilson's Reward starred Gerald S. O'Loughlin as Ginger Ted and Sandy Dennis as Miss Jones, renamed Martha James.
- Radio adaptations include a CBS broadcast from May 10, 1953 on Escape, featuring Jeanette Nolan, Alan Reed and Ben Wright

== Title ==
The title of the story refers to Romans 9:22, which reads:

9:21 Hath not the potter power over the clay, of the same lump to make one vessel unto honour, and another unto dishonour? 9:22 What if God, willing to shew his wrath, and to make his power known, endured with much long suffering the vessels of wrath fitted to destruction: 9:23 And that he might make known the riches of his glory on the vessels of mercy, which he had afore prepared unto glory, 9:24 Even us, whom he hath called, not of the Jews only, but also of the Gentiles?

== Plot summary ==
Miss Jones, a missionary, lives with her brother in the Alas Islands. They are scandalised by the presence on the islands of Ginger Ted, a drunkard and womanizing scoundrel.

Miss Jones travels to an outlying island to treat an appendicitis case. She is horrified to find that Ginger Ted is also on board the boat on which she returns. The boat breaks down en route and they are forced to spend the night on a small island. Miss Jones is certain that Ginger Ted means to rape her as soon as the sun goes down. When morning comes and her virtue is still intact, she is convinced that he has had a change of heart and that he is, after all, a good man. Ginger Ted himself is outraged by this suggestion; it never occurred to him to rape Miss Jones.

Subsequently there is a cholera epidemic. Miss Jones persuades Ginger Ted to accompany her as she travels the islands to render treatment. He returns a non-drinking missionary, engaged to Miss Jones.
