= The Narrow Corner (film) =

1933 film directed by Alfred Edward Green

- Directed by: Alfred E. Green
- Written by: W. Somerset Maugham (novel); Robert Presnell
- Produced by: Hal B. Wallis
- Starring: Douglas Fairbanks Jr. Patricia Ellis; Ralph Bellamy
- Cinematography: Tony Gaudio
- Edited by: Herbert I. Leeds
- Music by: Bernhard Kaun
- Production company: Warner Bros. Pictures
- Distributed by: Warner Bros. Pictures
- Release date: July 8, 1933
- Running time: 69 minutes
- Country: United States
- Language: English

The Narrow Corner is a 1933 American pre-Code drama film directed by Alfred E. Green and starring Douglas Fairbanks Jr., Patricia Ellis and Ralph Bellamy. It is an adaptation of Somerset Maugham's 1932 novel The Narrow Corner. It was remade in 1936 as Isle of Fury.

The film's sets were designed by the art director Robert M. Haas.

== Plot ==
A fugitive Englishman, wanted for murder, ends up in the Dutch East Indies.

== Cast ==
- Douglas Fairbanks Jr. as Fred Blake
- Patricia Ellis as Louise Frith
- Ralph Bellamy as Eric Whittenson
- Dudley Digges as Doctor Saunders
- Arthur Hohl as Captain Nichols
- Reginald Owen as Mr. Frith
- Henry Kolker as Mr. Blake, Fred's Father
- William V. Mong as Jack Swan
- Willie Fung as Ah Kay, Saunder's Servant
- Sidney Toler as Ryan, the Go-Between

== Bibliography ==
- Samuel J. Rogal. A William Somerset Maugham Encyclopedia. Greenwood Publishing, 1997.
