= The Garden of Evening Mists (film) =

2019 film by Tom Lin Shu-yu

- Theatrical release poster
- Directed by: Tom Lin Shu-yu
- Screenplay by: Richard Smith
- Based on: The Garden of Evening Mists by Tan Twan Eng
- Produced by: Najwa Abu Bakar (Note: Najwa also credited as executive producer); Elyce Chin; Syahrul Imran Shariffudin
- Starring: Lee Sin-je; Hiroshi Abe; Sylvia Chang; David Oakes; John Hannah; Serene Lim; Tan Kheng Hua; Julian Sands
- Cinematography: Kartik Vijay
- Edited by: Soo Mun Thye
- Music by: Onn San
- Production companies: Astro Shaw; HBO Asia; National Film Development Corporation Malaysia; CJ Entertainment
- Distributed by: Astro Shaw (Malaysia); HBO Asia (United States)
- Release dates: 4 October 2019 (BIFF); 29 November 2019 (Taiwan); 26 December 2019 (Hong Kong); 16 January 2020 (Malaysia & Singapore); 24 July 2021 (Japan)
- Running time: 120 minutes
- Country: Malaysia
- Languages: English (partial Japanese, Malay, Cantonese)

The Garden of Evening Mists (Chinese: 夕霧花園) is a 2019 Malaysian English-language historical drama film directed by Tom Lin Shu-yu from the screenplay of Richard Smith and adapted from Tan Twan Eng's 2012 novel of same name. A woman, still haunted by her experiences in a Japanese internment camp as a child, travels to Cameron Highlands during the Malayan Emergency and becomes the apprentice of a mysterious Japanese gardener. It stars Lee Sin-je, Sylvia Chang and Hiroshi Abe.

A co-production between Malaysia's Astro Shaw (Note: Astro Shaw credited as 'presents' and 'a production by') and HBO Asia, the film was filmed on location in Malaysia. It premiered in 2019 in South Korea, Taiwan and Hong Kong, 16 January 2020 in Malaysia, Brunei and Singapore, and 24 July 2021 in Japan.

The film received generally positive reviews. It received nine nominations at the 56th Golden Horse Awards, winning for Best Makeup and Costume Design, won Best Film at the 2020 Asian Academy Creative Awards and won three awards at the 2021 Malaysia Film Festival.

== Plot ==
During the Japanese occupation of Malaya, local women Teoh Yun Ling and her sister are imprisoned and tortured in a brutal Japanese war camp. Yun Ling escapes, but her sister and all other prisoners perish.

After the war, Yun Ling has become a Supreme Court judge based in Kuala Lumpur. She is involved in prosecuting war crimes, including from Japanese soldiers. The location of her former internment camp is never discovered. Haunted by her sister's death, she travels to Cameron Highlands during the Malayan Emergency to meet her friend Frederick, whose family have a tea plantation. Frederick introduces her to Japanese gardener Nakamura Aritomo, who resides there and is building a Yugiri, or "garden of evening mists". Yun Ling asks him to build a Japanese garden to fulfil a promise she had made to her deceased sister. Arimoto initially refuses, but later agrees to teach her the techniques of Japanese gardening so that she may build one herself. He also requests that he create a complex full-body horimono (Japanese tattoo) on Yung Ling's back. As the two undergo hard labour to develop the garden, they develop a romantic relationship. One night, communist guerrillas enter the house and attempt to kidnap the couple, but they escape.

It is later revealed that Aritomo was a Japanese agent tasked with hiding looted treasures in Malaysia, but is conflicted about his involvement. He hides information on the treasure's location in Yung Ling's tattoo and in the garden in Cameron Highlands.

Japanese officials visit and request Aritomo return to Japan to tend for the Emperor's garden. Yun Ling recognises one of the officials from the internment camp.

== Cast ==
- Angelica Lee Sin-je as Teoh Yun Ling (younger)
- Sylvia Chang as Teoh Yun Ling (older)
- Hiroshi Abe as Nakamura Aritomo
- David Oakes as Frederik Gemmell (younger)
- Julian Sands as Frederik Gemmell (older)
- John Hannah as Magnus Gemmell
- Serene Lim as Teoh Yun Hong
- Tan Kheng Hua as Emily
- Loo Aye Keng as Anne
- Wan Hanafi Su as Jaafar Hamid

== Production ==
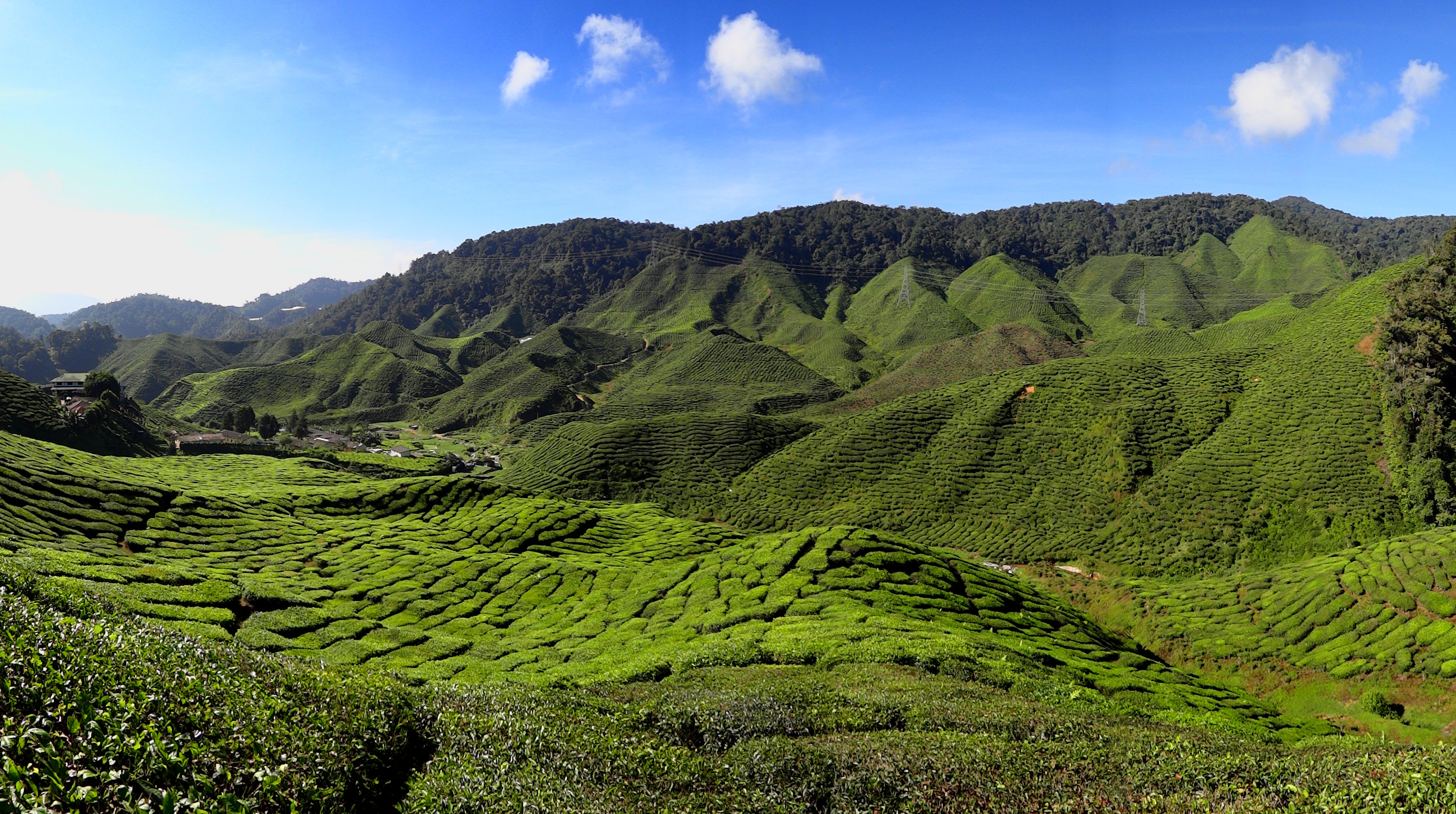
The novel and film is set in Cameron Highlands, where most of the scenes are filmed. In the picture are tea plantation hills.

The film is based on the 2012 English-language novel of same name, written by Tan Twan Eng. The book was well received and won the 2012 Man Asian Literary Prize. In 2014, it was announced that the novel would be adapted by Malaysian film company Astro Shaw and HBO Asia, with support from National Film Development Corporation Malaysia (FINAS). The film was originally to be written and directed by Malaysian filmmakers.

Taiwanese director Tom Lin Shi-yu was eventually chosen to direct, while screenwriting was passed to Scottish screenwriter, Richard Smith. The cast are Malaysian actress Lee Sinje, Japanese actor Hiroshi Abe, Taiwanese actress Sylvia Chang, British actors David Oakes, Julian Sands, Scottish actor John Hannah, Malaysian actress Serene Lim and Singaporean actress Tan Kheng Hua.

The production team members are from Taiwan, Japan, Malaysia, Singapore, India, Australia and the United Kingdom. Principal photography started in July 2018. Filming took place in Malaysia, including Cameron Highlands. The internment camp and small gardens in the film are constructed. 90% of the dialogue in the film is English, with some Cantonese, Japanese and Malay language.

== Release ==
The film had its world premiere at the 24th Busan International Film Festival on 4 October 2019. It was screened in November 2019 at the Hong Kong Asian Film Festival and Taipei Golden Horse Film Festival 2019.

The film was released on 29 November 2019 in Taiwan, 26 December 2019 in Hong Kong, and 16 January 2020 in Malaysia, Brunei and Singapore.

The Malaysian version of the film is 1 hour and 53 minutes, which is slightly different from the international version of 2 hours. It is reported that the Malaysian version has an affectionate scene cut by the Film Censorship Board of Malaysia, and some scenes have been slightly adjusted, the film is still overall complete and the cut does not affect the plot.

== Reception ==
=== Critical reception ===
The film received generally positive reviews from critics. The Hollywood Reporter called it a "sturdy, well-mounted historical romance." In South China Morning Post, James Marsh gave a more mixed review, particularly criticising the dialogue.

=== Accolades ===
At the 56th Golden Horse Awards, the film was nominated for nine awards, and won one award. It was nominated for Best Feature Film, Best Director for Tom Lin, Best Leading Actress for Lee Sinje, it won the Best Makeup and Costume Design.

Awards	Year	Category	Recipients	Result	Ref.
56th Golden Horse Awards	2019	Best Feature Film	The Garden of Evening Mists	Nominated	
56th Golden Horse Awards	2019	Best Director	Tom Lin Shu-yu	Nominated	
56th Golden Horse Awards	2019	Best Leading Actress	Lee Sinje	Nominated	
56th Golden Horse Awards	2019	Best Adapted Screenplay	Richard Smith	Nominated	
56th Golden Horse Awards	2019	Best Cinematography	Kartik Vijay	Nominated	
56th Golden Horse Awards	2019	Best Art Direction	Penny Tsai Pei-ling, Lum Heng-soon, Chen Hsuan-shao	Nominated	
56th Golden Horse Awards	2019	Best Makeup & Costume Design	Nikki Gooley, Biby Chow, Penny Tsai Pei-ling, Nina Edwards	Won	
56th Golden Horse Awards	2019	Best Original Film Score	Onn San	Nominated	
56th Golden Horse Awards	2019	Best Film Editing	Soo Mun-thye	Nominated	
Asian Academy Creative Awards	2020	Best Feature Film	The Garden of Evening Mists	Won	
31st Malaysia Film Festival	2021	Best Original Story	Tan Twan Eng	Won	
31st Malaysia Film Festival	2021	Best Visual Special Effects	The Garden of Evening Mists	Won	
31st Malaysia Film Festival	2021	Best Actress	Lee Sinje	Won	
