= Ethel Proudlock case =

1911 shooting and murder trial in Malaysia

The Ethel Proudlock case refers to a 1911 shooting by Proudlock, her trial for murder, and the cause célèbre it created, scandalising British colonial society in Kuala Lumpur, Federated Malay States.

W. Somerset Maugham wrote a short story, "The Letter", based on the Proudlock case, followed by a successful 1927 play, also titled The Letter. His play then received several film and TV adaptations, most notably William Wyler's 1940 film.

== History ==
Ethel Mabel Proudlock, née Charter, was born 11 August 1886. Her father Robert Charter had arrived in Malaysia in 1896. He was a clerk at the Public Works Department of Kuala Lumpur as well as chief European volunteer of the local fire brigade. The Charters, as one of the oldest families in the area, were very well respected.

The identity of Ethel's birth mother is unclear, as her father was married but not to Ethel's mother. Some documents suggest that Ethel was the product of an affair between Charter and his sister-in-law. There have also been theories that the absence of a mother's name on Ethel's birth certificate could indicate her mother was a Malaysian woman, making Ethel Eurasian. Ethel was said to not be close to her step-mother Mary nor to her siblings. But to all intents and purposes, Ethel was accepted as a legitimate daughter of the Charter family and was part of the social scene.

In June 1905, she became engaged to William Proudlock, the acting headmaster of the prestigious Victoria Institution for boys in Kuala Lumpur. The couple married on 19 April 1907, at St Mary's Church.

After the marriage, the couple left for England on account of Ethel's poor health. While living there, they had a daughter, Dorothy, on 30 January 1908, after whose birth they returned to Malaysia. There the family lived a quiet life, with Ethel taking care of the household, assisting her husband with the running of the school, and singing in the local church choir.

=== The victim ===
William Crozier Steward was born in Cardiff, Wales, in 1876, the son of a merchant. After the family moved to England, Steward grew up in Whitehaven. Trained as an engineer, he travelled to Malaysia, where he managed a tin mine. After the mine shut down, he worked as a consulting engineer for F.W. Baker & Co, a Singaporean firm.

Stewart was described by one of his friends as "a temperate man" not given to drinking in excess and as of "generally good moral character, by the accepted general standards". A bachelor, Steward was in a relationship with a Chinese woman.

Steward was acquainted with both of the Proudlocks and had been in their company at the Selangor Club as well as visiting them at their bungalow.

=== The shooting ===
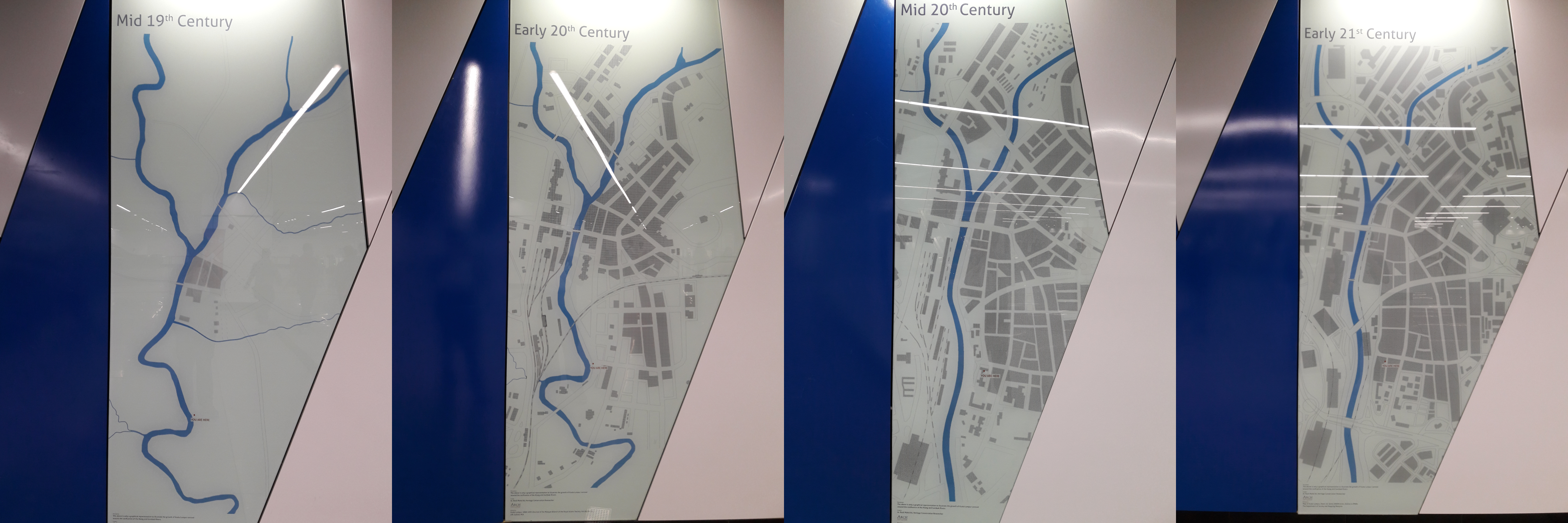
Montage of historical maps of the Klang River, taken at the Pasar Seni MRT/LRT station. The Victoria Institution was located on its eastern bank when the murder occurred. The school's site was located several metres south of the present-day station, marked 'You Are Here'.

On the evening of 23 April 1911, Ethel and William Proudlock had attended Evensong at the local church. Her husband had made plans to dine with a fellow teacher; therefore, Proudlock was alone in the VI headmaster's bungalow (3°8′28″N 101°41′40″E), near the present-day Pasar Seni LRT/MRT station.

Meanwhile, Steward was dining at the Empire Hotel with friends when he suddenly got up and announced that he had plans to go see someone at 9 o'clock. Steward arrived at the Proudlock bungalow by rickshaw, and told the rickshaw boy Tan Ng Tee to wait outside. Moving his rickshaw away from the house, shortly afterwards, the boy heard two shots and saw Steward stumble out of the bungalow across the veranda, down the steps and collapse lifeless on the ground. He was followed by Proudlock who was holding a Webley revolver. She then emptied the remaining four chambers into him.

After this Proudlock asked their cook to fetch her husband from his friends house. Arriving home to the crime scene, her husband found Proudlock in a state of shock. Police were summoned and described her demeanour as one of outward bodily calmness while seeming mentally confused. Proudlock was taken into custody and recounted the sequence of events that had led to the death of Steward.

Proudlock stood trial for murder in June 1911. Her non-jury trial was heard by a judge and two assessors. It lasted 10 days and attracted intense local interest. Proudlock claimed that Steward had attempted to rape her and that she was acting in self-defence. However, the judge found her guilty of murder on the basis of inconsistencies in her testimony and other circumstantial evidence, and sentenced her to death by hanging.

Incriminating details which led to her being sentenced was that Proudlock admitted previously having invited Steward to the Proudlocks home but no clear date had been set for this visit.

Furthermore, both of the Proudlocks were members of the local Rifle Club, and Ethel herself was considered an excellent shot. A few days before the shooting, Proudlock had acquired a revolver and had even been practising at the shooting range the very day of the murder.

There was also doubt cast on her actions that even after Proudlock had incapacitated Steward, she had followed him outside to shoot him several more times. This was in the eyes of the judge and the assessors not the actions of a woman who frantically fought for her virtue and in desperation reached for a weapon but was rather seen as a cold-blooded and calculated execution.

The verdict caused a furore in Kuala Lumpur's British expatriate community, prompting The Malay Mail to issue this notice:

We decline to associate ourselves with the hysterical outbursts which have followed the judicial decision... Correspondence has already appeared in our columns touching upon the case, and the opinions of our readers will receive publicity within limits. But for those who have gone to all kinds of adjectival extremes in the attempt to splutter forth their wrath against the judge and assessors, it may be added that their effusions will find the oblivion of the wastepaper basket.

=== Aftermath ===
Proudlock appealed the verdict and spent five months in Pudu jail awaiting her appeal. During the course of her imprisonment, a number of petitions were created for her, including one from her husband and the boys of the Victoria Institution, prompting Sultan Sulaiman of Selangor to pardon her. She immediately left the colony with her father and three-year-old daughter. They travelled first to England, aboard the SS Hitachi Maru, where they were met by her brother-in-law with whom they were to live.

Later Proudlock and her daughter emigrated to the United States.

Her husband left soon after his wife and daughter did for England. It is not known whether he ever rejoined her, but he did correspond with her. He returned briefly to England in 1930. By 1931, he had moved to South Africa and ultimately to Argentina to teach at St. George's College, Quilmes. He died in 1958.

Ethel Proudlock died in 1974 in Miami, United States.

== Legacy ==
In addition to the 1927 Maugham play and 1940 Wyler movie, the Ethel Proudlock case was referenced in the 1977 film East of Elephant Rock by Don Boyd.

It was also the subject of a 2000 non-fiction book by Eric Lawlor, Murder on the Verandah.

The Proudlock case appears in the novel The House of Doors (2023) by Tan Twan Eng. Ethel tells her closest friend Lesley Hamlyn the supposed reason for shooting William Steward:

"He [her husband] made me do it, Lesley." Her voice sounded dead, as dead as her eyes. Despite the cloudless sky I felt cold all of a sudden. "I had no choice. He made me kill William."

Other details in the novel generally support the theory dramatized in Somerset Maugham's The Letter, namely, that Proudlock killed Steward in a jealous rage when he came to see her that night to end their extramarital affair.

== See also ==
- Lord Erroll murder case. A 1941 murder case amongst the Happy Valley set that similarly scandalised British colonial society in Kenya.

== Notes ==
1. The Klang River was straightened later; the site of the now-demolished Proudlock bungalow currently lies on the opposite side of the river, in front of the KTM Komuter station.
