= 45th Golden Horse Awards =

Award ceremony for Chinese-language films of 2007 and 2008

- Promotional poster designed by Aaron Nieh
- Date: December 6, 2008
- Site: Zhongshan Hall, Taichung, Taiwan
- Hosted by: Carol Cheng and Blackie Chen
- Preshow hosts: Sonia Sui and Mickey Huang
- Organized by: Taipei Golden Horse Film Festival Executive Committee

Highlights
- Best Feature Film: The Warlords
- Best Director: Peter Chan; The Warlords
- Best Actor: Zhang Hanyu; Assembly
- Best Actress: Prudence Liew; True Women for Sale
- Most awards: Cape No. 7 (6)
- Most nominations: The Warlords (12)

Television in Taiwan
- Channel: Star Chinese Movies
- Ratings: 5.55 (average)

The 45th Golden Horse Awards (Mandarin:第45屆金馬獎) took place on December 6, 2008 at Zhongshan Hall in Taichung, Taiwan.

== Winners and nominees ==
Winners are listed first and highlighted in boldface.

**Best Feature Film**: **The Warlords**; Cape No. 7; Orz Boyz; Assembly; Ocean Flame	**Best Short Film**: **Hopscotch**; My Grandma; A Son; The End of the Tunnel
**Best Documentary**: **Up the Yangtze**; This Darling Life; Erotic Float Dancers	**Best Animation Feature** -
**Best Director**: **Peter Chan — The Warlords**; Wei Te-sheng — Cape No. 7; Sylvia Chang — Run Papa Run; Pang Ho-cheung — Trivial Matters	**Best Leading Actor**: **Zhang Hanyu — Assembly**; Liao Fan — Ocean Flame; Jet Li — The Warlords; Louis Koo — Run Papa Run
**Best Leading Actress**: **Prudence Liew — True Women for Sale**; Monica Mok — Ocean Flame; Karena Lam — Claustrophobia; Sandrine Pinna — Miao Miao	**Best Supporting Actor**: **Ma Ju-lung — Cape No. 7**; Eason Chan — Trivial Matters; Leon Dai — Parking; Hu Jun — Red Cliff
**Best Supporting Actress**: **Mei Fang — Orz Boyz**; Lai Meng — Money No Enough 2; Wu Liqi — Detours to Paradise; Nora Miao — Run Papa Run	**Best New Performer**: **Suming — Hopscotch**; Chie Tanaka — Cape No. 7; Johnny C.J. Lin — Cape No. 7; Pang Chin-yu — Orz Boyz
**Audience Choice Award**: **Cape No. 7**; The Warlords; Orz Boyz; Assembly; Ocean Flame	**FIPRESCI Prize** **(award for first and second features)**: **Parking**
**Outstanding Taiwanese Film of the Year**: **Cape No. 7**; Winds of September; Parking	**Outstanding Taiwanese Filmmaker of the Year**: **Wei Te-sheng**; Li Long-yu
**Special Contribution Award**: **Huang Jen**	**Lifetime Achievement Award**: **Chang Feng**
