= Trauma (2004 film) =

2004 British film by Marc Evans

- Theatrical release poster
- Directed by: Marc Evans
- Written by: Richard Smith
- Produced by: Nicky Kentish Barnes; Jonathan Cavendish
- Starring: Colin Firth; Mena Suvari; Naomie Harris; Sean Harris; Neil Edmond
- Cinematography: John Mathieson; Nic Sadler
- Edited by: Mags Arnold
- Music by: Alex Heffes
- Production companies: BBC Films; Isle of Man Film; Little Bird Productions
- Distributed by: Warner Bros. Pictures
- Release date: 17 September 2004
- Running time: 94 minutes
- Country: United Kingdom
- Language: English

Trauma is a 2004 British psychological thriller film directed by Marc Evans and written by Richard Smith.

== Plot ==
Ben (Colin Firth) awakens from a coma to discover his wife has been killed in a car accident. A few weeks later, Ben is out of the hospital and, attempting to start a new life, he moves home and is befriended by a beautiful young neighbour Charlotte (Mena Suvari). Haunted by visions of his dead wife, Ben starts to lose his grip on reality.

== Cast ==
- Colin Firth as Ben
- Mena Suvari as Charlotte
- Naomie Harris as Elisa
- Sean Harris as Roland
- Neil Edmond as Mills
- Tommy Flanagan as Tommy
- Kenneth Cranham as Detective Constable Jackson
- Brenda Fricker as Petra
- Jo Maxwell-Muller as Grief-stricken Woman

== Critical reaction ==
The film is described by critics as a psychological thriller in the same vein as David Cronenberg, Memento, and Jacob's Ladder; however, most find that the film pales in comparison, with Eye Weekly calling it "just another pretentious Jacob's Ladder knockoff." The film has been described as stylish, with iofilm calling it "a triumph of style over content." Shadows on the Wall adds, "Evans fills the screen with... moody, atmospheric, and evocative visuals," and Filmcritic.com says the film has "The Ring-inspired creepy imagery."

Neil Young's Film Lounge describes the film's visual in this way: "Evans (along with cinematographer John Mathieson, production-designer Richard Smith and editor Mags Arnold) tries desperately to jazz everything up, deploying all manner of distorted visuals - extreme camera angles and close-ups, plus over-atmospheric lighting effects and jagged cuts - in a strenuous attempt to get us into Ben's tormented state-of-mind."

Colin Firth's performance is the most praised aspect of the film. "He delivers a performance which highlights the range of his considerable talent" cites one critic. eFilmCritic says Firth "does the best with what he's given" and iofilm says, "Firth puts in a sterling performance in the central role." Reel Film Reviews adds "Firth's performance, not surprisingly, is the best thing about the movie, and the actor does a nice job of portraying Ben's increasing paranoia."

On the review aggregator website Rotten Tomatoes, 25% of 16 critics' reviews are positive, with an average rating of 4.5/10.

=== Film festivals ===
Listed Chronologically

- Sundance Film Festival
- Cannes Film Market
- Edinburgh Film Festival
- Toronto International Film Festival
- Lund Fantastisk Film Festival
- Athens Film Festival
- Gérardmer Fantasticarts Film Festival
- Brussels International Festival of Fantasy Films
- München Fantasy Filmfest
