= The Casuarina Tree =

1926 collection of short stories by W. Somerset Maugham

- US first edition
- Author: W. Somerset Maugham
- Cover artist: Winifred E. Lefferts
- Language: English
- Genre: Short story collection
- Publisher: William Heinemann, UK; George H. Doran Company, New York
- Publication date: 1926
- Publication place: United Kingdom
- Media type: Print (hardcover)
- Pages: 288 pages (US first edition)

The Casuarina Tree is a collection of short stories by W. Somerset Maugham, set in the Federated Malay States during the 1920s. It was first published by the UK publishing house Heinemann on 2 September 1926. The first American edition was published on 17 September 1926 by George H. Doran. It was re-published by Collins in London under the title The Letter: Stories of Crime. The book was published in French translation as Le Sortilège Malais (1928) and in Spanish as Extremo Oriente (1945).

The stories are loosely based on Maugham's experiences traveling with his companion Gerald Haxton in the region for six months in 1921 and four months in 1925. He published a second set of short stories based on these travels, Ah King, in 1933.

Maugham was considered persona non grata among the expatriate British community in the Federated Malay States following the publication of The Casuarina Tree, as he was felt to have betrayed confidences and to have painted the community in an unflattering light through his focus on scandal.

== Explanation of the title ==
The Casuarina tree of the title is native to Australasia and Southeast Asia, often used to stabilise soils. In Maugham's foreword, he writes that the title was a metaphor for "the English people who live in the Malay Peninsula and in Borneo because they came along after the adventurous pioneers who opened the country to Western civilisation." He likens the pioneers to mangroves reclaiming a swamp, and the expatriates to Casuarinas, who came later and served there. He then learned that his idea was incorrect botanically but decided it would suggest the planters and administrators who for him, were in their turn the organisers and "protectors" of society.

== Contents ==
The stories—

1. Before the Party
2. P. & O.
3. The Outstation
4. The Force of Circumstance
5. The Yellow Streak
6. The Letter

Maugham wrote the introduction, "The Casuarina Tree" and postscript, himself.

== Major themes ==
The major themes are class division, racial difference, adultery, personal competitiveness, and human nature in reaction to fate.

The strong thread running through the stories is alienation and contrast – between people and cultures. For most of the characters, after a crisis in their circumstances, life seems to take up where it left off and closes over the revelations that brought on the drama.

People who are regarded as sane and level-headed, reliable and "well brought-up" show their unexpected real character in a crisis, their inner workings become exposed in reaction to surprise events. The exceptional circumstances are about being away from the England of law and order, in a wild, unfathomable foreign country where they may be misled, misunderstood, faced with life-or-death decisions, physically and mentally at risk, or beyond the scrutiny of their peers.

== Story plots ==
=== Before the Party ===
The upper-class Skinner family is preparing to attend a party. Among them is silent older daughter Millicent, mother of a young child and widowed when her husband, a colonial administrator, died of fever eight months earlier while they were living in Borneo; she and her child have returned home to England to live with her parents and sister. During this era, the early twentieth century, when propriety dictated a strict period of mourning, it is one of Millicent's first social appearances since her husband's death.

While the Skinners are gathering to leave, after one question too many from her younger sister, who's heard a rumour that her brother-in-law was a drinker and didn't die of fever after all, Millicent tells the true story of her husband's death. Explaining her discovery that he was an incorrigible drunk with a well-known reputation within the colony, and that he had married Millicent while on home leave largely because he'd been warned he'd be sacked if he didn't find himself a wife who could keep him in line, she describes her dogged attempts to reform him—and to preserve her marriage. (Both Skinner sisters had grown old enough to be considered spinsters, and Millicent in particular had been anxious to marry; she had not imagined herself in love with her husband, but it is a blow to discover just how far from in love with her he had been.)

After having been impressively sober for some months and an attentive husband and father—just when he'd given Millicent reason to believe she had triumphed—he relapses badly, and the discovery is so stark and so bitter that she stabs him to death with the ornamental native sword hanging above the bed where she found him drunk. It was easy to conceal the true cause of death from the local council, and by now the jungle has reclaimed the body in its entirety, so there's no danger whatsoever that her crime will be discovered, Millicent tells her family in conclusion.

Her proper parents and sibling are aghast; her father, a lawyer, considers his duty; but the overall impression is that her family is stunned by the impropriety of Millicent's deed. It simply was shockingly bad form.

The short story was dramatized in 1949 by Rodney Ackland.

=== P. & O. ===
Two people are returning home to the British Isles from the Federated Malay States: a woman who's leaving her husband after many years of marriage, and a middle-aged man heading back to Ireland and retirement after 25 years as a planter. Mrs Hamlyn is forty and has left her husband not strictly because he betrayed her—it is not her husband's first dalliance—but because this time her husband really cares for the woman, and has refused to give up his mistress.

Things aboard ship are merry, as the various passengers plan a Christmas party, until the planter, Mr. Gallagher, develops incurable hiccups. His assistant, Mr. Pryce, becomes exasperated with the doctor's ineffectiveness, confiding to Mrs Hamlyn that the native woman Gallagher left behind put a spell on him: he will die, she swore, before reaching land. Despite a witch doctor's efforts to beat the curse, Gallagher does die at sea, and through his death Mrs Hamlyn becomes aware of the importance of living. She writes a letter of forgiveness to her husband.

=== The Outstation ===
A story of brinksmanship follows two incompatible rivals, the precisely disciplined Resident officer, Mr Warburton, and his newly arrived, uncouth assistant, Mr Cooper. In a battle of class differences, the feisty Cooper, despite his competence in his job, manages to repel his more refined boss and to make enemies of the native helpers. Each man is extremely lonely for the company of another white, but their mutual dislike is such that each wishes the other dead.

=== The Force of Circumstance ===
Guy meets and marries Doris in England while on leave from Malaya; she returns there with him much in love and ready to make a home for him in the same house where he's been the resident officer for ten years.

When a native woman lurks about the compound with her small children and makes an ever-growing nuisance of herself, Guy at last reveals the woman's connection to him, one he had believed Doris need never discover, since residents usually were not sent back to their old posts after returning from home leave. Such domestic arrangements as he had with the native woman are common and expected among unmarried white men in the colony, he assures Doris, and the native women expect the arrangements to end as casually as they begin; there was no love between them, nor any expectation of any; and the woman was paid well to go away and is unusual in her refusal to be gone.

Despite loving Guy and knowing he loves her, despite her appreciation of his loneliness so far from home without white companions, Doris is repelled by the discovery that he lived with a native woman and fathered her children.

=== The Yellow Streak ===
"The Yellow Streak" is an internal story of class snobbery, racism and frail human nature in the face of death. Izzart is an insecure snob with a secret who is put in charge of the safety of Campion, a mining engineer hired by the Sultan of fictional Sembulu to discover mineral possibilities in Borneo. Drink, vanity, carelessness and self-doubt bring Izzart to cracking point when an incident with a tidal wave on the river means it's every (white) man for himself. Not only his weakness, but his inner torment is clear to the more experienced Campion.

In 2020 the Chief Minister of Sarawak suggested that this story be made the basis of tourism promotion in Sri Aman which is well known for the tidal bore featured in the story.

=== The Letter ===
A Singapore-based lawyer, Joyce, is called on to defend Leslie Crosbie, a planter's wife who is arrested after shooting Geoffrey Hammond, a neighbour, in her home in Malaya while her husband is away on business. Her initial claim to have acted in self-defence to prevent Hammond from raping her falls under suspicion after Ong Chi Seng, a junior clerk in Joyce's law office, comes to Joyce with the information that a letter is in existence showing that Hammond had come to Leslie Crosbie's house that night at her invitation.

It emerges that the letter is in the possession of Hammond's Chinese mistress. Using Ong Chi Seng as a go-between, she blackmails the husband, Robert Crosbie, into purchasing the letter at an exorbitant price. Having paid dearly to save his wife from a possible death sentence for murder or at least a period of some years in prison for manslaughter, Robert Crosbie reads the letter and is confronted with the fact of his wife's infidelity – it turns out that she and Hammond had been lovers for years and that she had shot him not to prevent rape, but in a jealous rage when Hammond rejected her and declared his love for his Chinese mistress.

The story is based on the real case of Mrs. Ethel Mabel Proudlock, who shot the manager of a tin mine, William Crozier Steward, on the veranda of her house in Kuala Lumpur in 1911.

This short story was later adapted for the stage by Maugham as The Letter (1927).

== Postscript ==
In the postscript Maugham explains choosing imaginary names for anywhere outside of Singapore because he based a lot of his material on personal experiences though the characters are composites. In his disclaimer he recounts that while the people are imaginary, an incident in "The Yellow Streak" was "based on a misadventure" of his own.
