= Alas Islands =

Islands of Papua New Guinea

Coordinates: 4°39′S 153°04′E

The Alas Islands are part of Papua New Guinea. They are located at longitude 153.067 east and latitude 4.650 south.

The islands are the setting for W. Somerset Maugham's short story "The Vessel of Wrath".
