= Les Misérables (1952 film) =

1952 American film based on the novel directed by Lewis Milestone

- Theatrical release poster
- Directed by: Lewis Milestone
- Screenplay by: Richard Murphy
- Based on: Les Misérables; 1862 novel by Victor Hugo
- Produced by: Fred Kohlmar
- Starring: Michael Rennie; Debra Paget; Robert Newton; Edmund Gwenn
- Cinematography: Joseph LaShelle
- Edited by: Hugh S. Fowler
- Music by: Alex North
- Distributed by: Twentieth Century-Fox
- Release date: August 14, 1952 (New York)
- Running time: 105 minutes
- Country: United States
- Language: English
- Box office: $1.1 million (U.S. rentals)

Les Misérables is a 1952 American epic romantic historical drama adventure film adaptation of the 1862 novel Les Misérables by Victor Hugo. The film was directed by Lewis Milestone and stars Michael Rennie, Robert Newton and Sylvia Sidney.

== Cast ==
- Michael Rennie as Jean Valjean
- Debra Paget as Cosette
- Patsy Weil as Cosette (age 7)
- Robert Newton as Javert
- Edmund Gwenn as Bishop Myriel
- Sylvia Sidney as Fantine
- Cameron Mitchell as Marius
- Elsa Lanchester as Madame Magloire
- June Hillman as Mother Superior
- Bobby Hyatt as Gavroche
- James Robertson Justice as Robert
- Joseph Wiseman as Genflou
- Rhys Williams as Brevet
- Florence Bates as Madame Bonnet
- Merry Anders as Cicely
- John Rogers as Bonnet
- Charles Keane as Corporal
- John Dierkes as Bosun
- Lewis Russell as Waiter

== Reception ==
In a contemporary review for The New York Times, critic A. H. Weiler wrote: "Twentieth Century-Fox's examination of the oppressed Jean Valjean's life, and his oppressors, is largely an expertly wrought product but one which makes few attempts to delve deeply into the minds of its principals. Hugo's trenchant and panoramic view of the times and of French injustice, which was both damning and sweeping, is rarely brought to the surface with dramatic force. But Richard Murphy's script and Lewis Milestone's direction are combined effectively in extracting the action, if not the genuine emotion, of the book."

== Radio adaptation ==
Les Misérables was presented on Lux Radio Theatre on December 22, 1952. The one-hour adaptation starred Ronald Colman, with Paget and Newton repeating their roles from the film.

== See also ==
- Adaptations of Les Misérables
