= Tan Twan Eng =

Malaysian writer (born 1972)

- 陳團英
- Born: 1972 (age 53–54); George Town, Penang, Malaysia
- Education: Bachelor of Laws
- Alma mater: University of London
- Occupation: Novelist
- Years active: 2007–present
- Notable work: The Gift of Rain; The Garden of Evening Mists; The House of Doors
- Website: www.tantwaneng.com

Tan Twan Eng

Chinese name
- Traditional Chinese: 陳團英
- Hanyu Pinyin: Chén Tuányīng
- Jyutping: Can4 Tyun4 Jing1
- Hokkien POJ: Tân Thoân-eng

Tan Twan Eng (Chinese: 陳團英; Pe̍h-ōe-jī: Tân Thoân-eng; b. 1972) is a Malaysian novelist who writes in English. He published his first novel, The Gift of Rain, in 2007. He is best known for his 2012 book The Garden of Evening Mists which won the Man Asian Literary Prize and Walter Scott Prize for Historical Fiction, and was shortlisted for the Man Booker Prize, making Tan the first Malaysian to be recognised by all three awards.

== Background and life ==
Tan was born in Penang and grew up in Kuala Lumpur.

He is of the Straits Chinese descent. Tan speaks mainly English, Malay, Penang Hokkien, and some Cantonese.

Tan attended a school in Petaling Jaya, where teachers used a cane to discipline the children for speaking in class or failing to do homework.

As a teenager he was a huge fan of synth-pop music bands like Pet Shop Boys, A-HA, OMD and Depeche Mode.

Tan studied law at the University of London and later worked as an advocate and solicitor in intellectual property law in one of Kuala Lumpur's leading law firms before becoming a full-time writer.

He has a first-dan ranking in aikido and lives in Malaysia.

== Career ==
His first novel, The Gift of Rain, published in 2007, was long-listed for the Man Booker Prize. It is set in Penang before and during the Japanese occupation of Malaya in World War II. The Gift of Rain has been translated into Italian, Spanish, Greek, Romanian, Czech, Serbian, French, Russian, Hungarian and German.

His second novel, The Garden of Evening Mists, was published in 2012. It was shortlisted for the 2012 Man Booker Prize and won the Man Asian Literary Prize, and the Walter Scott Prize for Historical Fiction. The novel was adapted into a film starring Hiroshi Abe, Lee Sin-je, John Hannah, David Oakes and Sylvia Chang, which was released in 2020.

Tan has spoken at literary festivals, including the Singapore Writers Festival, the Ubud Writers Festival in Bali, the Asia Man Booker Festival in Hong Kong, the Shanghai International Literary Festival, the Perth Writers Festival, the Abbotsford Convent in Melbourne, Australia, the Franschhoek Literary Festival in South Africa, the Borders Book Festival in Melrose, Scotland, the George Town Literary Festival in Penang, the Head Read Literary Festival in Tallinn, and many more.

He is one of the judges of the International Booker Prize 2023, the first Malaysian author to be appointed to that role.

His 2023 novel, The House of Doors, was longlisted for the Booker Prize and shortlisted for the 2024 Walter Scott Prize.

== Works ==
- The Gift of Rain (2007)
- The Garden of Evening Mists (2011)
- The House of Doors (2023)

== Awards ==
- Man Asian Literary Prize (2012)
- £25,000 Walter Scott Prize for Historical Fiction (2013)
