= Isle of Fury =

1936 film by Frank McDonald

- Directed by: Frank McDonald
- Screenplay by: Robert Hardy Andrews; William Jacobs
- Based on: The Narrow Corner; 1932 novel by W. Somerset Maugham
- Produced by: Bryan Fox
- Starring: Humphrey Bogart; Margaret Lindsay; Donald Woods
- Cinematography: Frank B. Good
- Edited by: Warren Low
- Music by: Howard Jackson
- Production company: Warner Bros. Pictures
- Distributed by: Warner Bros. Pictures
- Release date: 10 October 1936
- Running time: 60 minutes
- Country: United States
- Language: English

Isle of Fury is a 1936 American adventure film directed by Frank McDonald and starring Humphrey Bogart, Margaret Lindsay, and Donald Woods. It was produced and distributed by Warner Bros. Pictures.

The film was adapted by Robert Hardy Andrews and William Jacobs from the 1932 novel The Narrow Corner by W. Somerset Maugham. Warners had filmed the tale under its original title just three years earlier.

It was directed by the prolific B movie director McDonald and is one of Bogart's first leading roles. It was released on October 10, 1936.

== Plot ==
On the island of Tankana in the South Pacific, a violent storm rages while wedding vows are being exchanged between Val Stevens and Lucille Gordon in a small home ceremony. The ceremony is interrupted by word that a ship is sinking on an offshore reef. Val hurries through the vows then rushes into the churning surf. Only two survivors are pulled from the sea: the ship's captain, Deever, and the man who had chartered the boat, Eric Blake.

Blake appears cheerful once recovered, but the captain proves duplicitous, caught by the island's doctor while trying to steal money belonging to Blake. Val banishes him on the next steamer.

His thinly capitalized pearl business is in imminent jeopardy when he learns that his native divers refuse to harvest after two of their men drown. Val suits up in a diving outfit in order to show the natives that there is nothing to fear. He is tethered to the boat and fed with air by a hand pump. After being submerged where the natives disappeared, he gets attacked by a giant octopus and the fights for his life. All the while it is obvious topside that his two native head men are conspiring against him. With Val's intentionally mis-tied tether dragged below Eric jumps in and kills the octopus. Down to his last breath, Val is hauled to safety. After this, the friendship between the two men grows stronger, each having saved the other man's life.

Since first meeting the beautiful Lucille Eric has been smitten by her warmth and charm. In his nightly whiskey-fueled reveries, the island doctor, Hardy, seems to prod Eric to follow his feelings towards Lucille. Eric then rescues Val a second time when his two head men attempt to steal Val's pearl cache before it can be shipped out on the expected steamer. Val then urges Eric to stay on and become his partner, but Eric resolutely refuses, telling Val without explanation that he must sail on to his destination.

Over a very wet nightcap later that evening the doctor tells Eric that he knows that he is a detective who was sent to the island to capture Val, who is wanted by the authorities for a murder. Eric says that he has changed his mind, as he now feels that Val is innocent of the charge.

Eavesdropping through the bushes, the captain, who has stealthily returned to the island on a supply boat, misconstrues that Eric is the fugitive and tells Val that he is going to turn Eric in for a $5,000 reward. Val angrily dismisses the accusation, but the captain seeks to raise his blood against Eric by declaring that Eric is that moment at his home romancing his wife. Val rushes there, angrily misconstrues a warm hand-in-hand goodbye, but is promptly set straight by the doctor upon his fortuitous arrival.

Seeing that he has been defeated again, the captain appears and holds everyone at gunpoint.

Before anyone can make a rash and possibly fatal move, Lucille's grandfather stretches a gun into the room and shoots the captain dead. When given the option of leaving with Eric, Lucille pledges her determination to stick with Val.

On the quay the next morning awaiting the steamer, Eric responds to the doctor's enquiry of what he's going to put in his report. He says he will simply say that the wanted man is dead.

With that he boards the tender and waves farewell.

== Cast ==
- Humphrey Bogart as Valentine 'Val' Stevens
- Margaret Lindsay as Lucille Gordon
- Donald Woods as Eric Blake
- E. E. Clive as Dr. Hardy
- Paul Graetz as Captain Deever
- Gordan Hart as Antvar 'Chris' Anderson
- George Regas as Otar
- Sidney Bracey as Sam
- Tetsu Komai as Kim Lee
- Miki Morita as Oh Kay
- Houseley Stevenson as The Rector (credited as Housley Stevenson Sr.)
- Frank Lackteen as Old Native Lanar
- George Piltz as a native (uncredited)
