= The Narrow Corner =

1932 novel by W. Somerset Maugham

- First edition
- Author: W. Somerset Maugham
- Cover artist: Youngman Carter
- Language: English
- Publisher: William Heinemann
- Publication date: 1932
- Publication place: United Kingdom
- Media type: Print
- OCLC: 542670

The Narrow Corner is a novel by the British writer W. Somerset Maugham, published by William Heinemann in 1932.

A quote from Meditations, iii 10, by Marcus Aurelius, introduces the work: "Short therefore, is man's life, and narrow is the corner of the earth wherein he dwells."

In the story, set "a good many years ago" in the Dutch East Indies, a young Australian, cruising the islands after his involvement in a murder in Sydney, has a passionate affair on an island which causes a further tragedy.

== Background ==
In the preface to a collected edition, Maugham writes about the origin of two characters in the novel.

Dr. Saunders was based on "a medical student I had known when I was myself one and whom I continued to know till he died forty years later ... He had ... a great sense of humour, a pleasant cynicism and not a little unscrupulousness." After originally including Dr. Saunders in the short story "The Stranger" in On a Chinese Screen, Maugham remained interested in the character.

Captain Nichols originally appeared in The Moon and Sixpence (introduced in chapter 46); he was suggested by "a beachcomber I met in the South Seas.... He was a very pretty rascal, but he took my fancy. He had smuggled guns into South America and opium into China." An incident related by Nichols in The Moon and Sixpence was cut out during proof reading, since Maugham realised it could be the basis of a new novel.

== Summary ==
Dr. Saunders, an English doctor, is in Takana, an island in the Dutch East Indies, waiting to return home to Fu-Chou in China after performing an eye operation on a local merchant. While waiting he meets Captain Nichols, skipper of the lugger the Fenton, and Fred Blake, his only passenger. The relation between the cunning-looking Nichols, and the educated-looking, sullen young man Blake, intrigues Saunders; he arranges to have a passage on the Fenton where he can treat Nichols' chronic dyspepsia, and thereby begin his return home.

While they are at sea Nichols and Blake play cribbage for money, Blake usually winning. Nichols tells Saunders how he came to be skipper of the Fenton with Blake: in Sydney, Australia, unemployed and anxious to get away from his wife, Nichols met a man in a bar who arranged that he should cruise for a few months with Fred Blake. Apparently it was vital that Blake should disappear from Australia for a period; the reason for this is not known to Nichols.

The Fenton pauses at Kanda-Meira, twin islands of the Dutch East Indies, where Saunders is to stay for a while. They meet Erik Christesson, a young Dane who works for a Danish company there. Erik shows Saunders and Blake a ruined fort built when the island was part of the Portuguese Empire; Blake and Erik form a strong friendship. They visit a friend of Erik, Frith, a former teacher from Britain who has a nutmeg plantation, is interested in Eastern philosophy and in spare time is translating a Portuguese epic poem The Lusiads. They meet Swan, the Swedish father of Frith's late wife Catherine, and Frith's daughter Louise; she and Blake rapidly form a passionate relationship, unnoticed by the others.

Later, Erik talks to Saunders about Catherine, whom he regarded like a mother, and tells him he is unofficially engaged to Louise, whom he has loved for years.

Erik, in a chair outside Frith's house in the late evening, muses about Catherine and Louise. He sees someone coming outside from Louise's room; attacking him, he finds it is Blake. Erik returns home and shoots himself; his body is discovered by Blake.

After Erik's funeral, Blake tells Saunders what happened in Sydney. His father, important in local politics, knew Pat Hudson, an influential politician; Hudson's wife became obsessed with Fred Blake, and Fred eventually tried to end the affair. Mrs. Hudson, however, contrived a situation in which Pat Hudson interrupted them and Fred, attacked by Hudson, shot him dead. Elections were due to take place; to avoid a scandal, Fred's father arranged his disappearance, and later, as Fred learnt with relief from a cable received on Kanda-Meira, his father contrived to have him officially declared dead.

The Fenton leaves the island, and Saunders later leaves for Bali. Pausing in Singapore a month later he meets Nichols, who says that Blake was lost overboard, and when he looked in Blake's strong box for an address, no money was there; Blake had kept it with him. Saunders wonders if Nichols sent Blake overboard to retrieve the money he lost at cribbage.

== Film ==
A Hollywood film version of The Narrow Corner was produced and released in 1933. Directed by Alfred E. Green, it features Douglas Fairbanks, Jr. as Fred Blake, Patricia Ellis as Louise Frith, and Ralph Bellamy as Eric Whittenson.

The book was also the basis of the 1936 film Isle of Fury, starring Humphrey Bogart. The rather loose adaptation includes a scene where Bogart wrestles a giant octopus.

== Radio ==
A radio play, adapted from the novel by Howard Agg, was broadcast on BBC Home Service on 20 October 1962 and 29 January 1967. It featured Raymond Huntley as Dr Saunders, George Merritt as Captain Nichols and Denys Hawthorne as Fred Blake.

A radio play, adapted from the novel by Jeffrey Segal, was broadcast in BBC Radio 4's Saturday Night Theatre on 1 April 1989, with Garard Green as Dr Saunders and Douglas Blackwell as Captain Nichols.
