= The Letter (play) =

1927 play by W. Somerset Maugham

- First edition (Heinemann 1927)
- Original language: English
- Setting: A plantation in the Malay Peninsula, and Singapore

Premiere
- Date: 24 February 1927
- Place: Playhouse Theatre, London

The Letter is a 1927 play by W. Somerset Maugham, dramatised from a short story that he had published in Hearst's International Magazine in 1924, and in his 1926 collection The Casuarina Tree. The story was inspired by the real-life Ethel Proudlock case which involved the wife of the headmaster of Victoria Institution in Kuala Lumpur who was convicted in a murder trial after shooting dead a male friend in April 1911. She was eventually pardoned.

== Synopsis ==
In the play, the action takes place in the house of a plantation owner, Robert Crosbie, and his wife Leslie in the then-British colony of Malaya, and later in the Chinese quarter of Singapore. With the husband away on business, the wife claims that she shot her husband's friend, Geoff Hammond, in self-defence, following an attempted rape; it is later revealed that Hammond was her lover, but had rejected her in favour of a native woman. The play focuses on the steps taken by the wife's lawyer to convince the court of her innocence, following the discovery of an incriminating letter, which he bribes the native woman to return. Leslie is acquitted but sees her punishment as being that she has killed the man she really loved.

== Productions ==
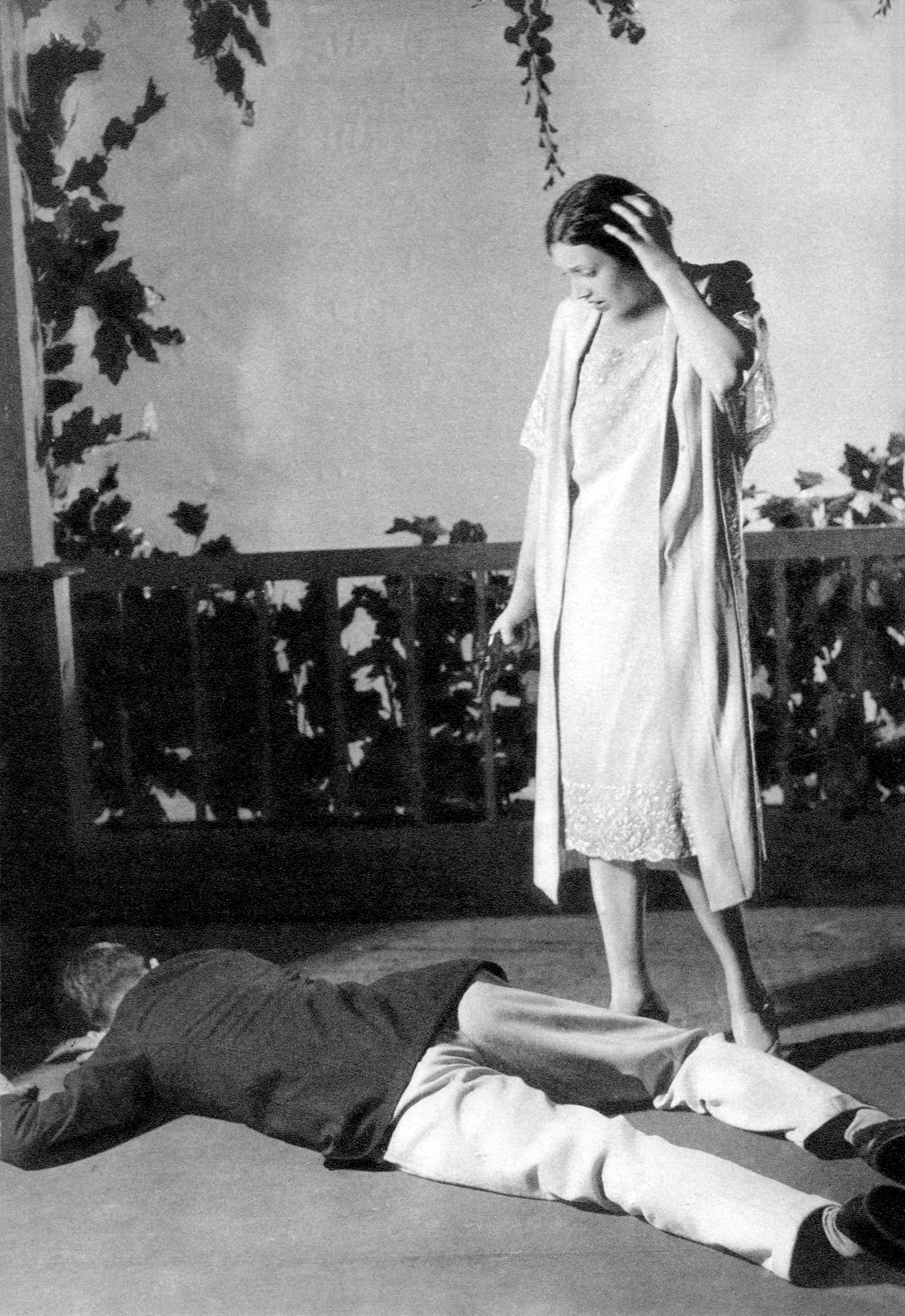
Katharine Cornell with Burton McEvilly in the Broadway production of The Letter (1927)

Gladys Cooper both produced and starred in the London premiere of the play in 1927 at the Playhouse Theatre where it ran for 60 weeks, including a tour of the provinces. The part of the husband was played by Nigel Bruce. Directed by Gerald du Maurier, this play was the first that Cooper had produced on her own and proved to be an important milestone in her theatrical career. In return for Cooper agreeing to produce the play, Maugham offered her an option on his next three plays: The Constant Wife, which she refused, The Sacred Flame, which she accepted, and The Breadwinner, which she also declined.

Katharine Cornell starred in the Broadway production that opened at the Morosco Theatre on 26 September 1927 and ran for 104 performances. The cast included J. W. Austin (Robert Crosbie) and Allan Jeayes (Howard Joyce); Guthrie McClintic directed. The Broadway version did not include a scene that had been inserted into the final act in London, a flashback that related what had occurred immediately before the shooting that begins the play. After viewing the Broadway production's 12 September premiere in Toronto, The New York Times commended the omission of this "awkward and artificial movie technique".

=== Revivals ===
Repertoire performances included 1954 at the Grand Theatre, Wolverhampton UK.

The play was revived in 1995 at the Lyric Hammersmith, directed by Neil Bartlett and starring Joanna Lumley and Tim Pigott-Smith, and in 2007 at Wyndham's Theatre, directed by Alan Strachan and starring Jenny Seagrove and Anthony Andrews.

== Adaptations ==
=== Film ===
There are many film versions of the story, the two most widely known being Jean de Limur's 1929 version made by Paramount Pictures and starring Jeanne Eagels, and William Wyler's 1940 version made by Warner Bros., starring Bette Davis. While de Limur's English-language version was made at Paramount's Astoria studios, several foreign-language versions were produced at the company's studios in Joinville-le-Pont: Louis Mercanton's French version, La lettre (1930), Dimitri Buchowetzki's German version, Weib im Dschungel (1931), Adelqui Migliar's Spanish version, La carta (1931) and Jack Salvatori's Italian version, La donna bianca (1931). Another non-English-language adaptation is Kira Muratova's Перемена участи / Peremena uchasti / A Change of Fate (1987).

=== Television ===
The story was also adapted for six television anthology series: on 30 January 1950 for Robert Montgomery Presents with Madeleine Carroll; on 3 November 1952 for Broadway Television Theatre with Sylvia Sidney; on 15 October 1956 for Producers' Showcase (directed by William Wyler), on 2 December 1956 for BBC Sunday-Night Theatre with Celia Johnson. in 1960 for The Somerset Maugham Hour and in 1969 for W. Somerset Maugham (directed by Christopher Morahan). A made-for-TV movie directed by John Erman and starring Lee Remick was made and released in 1982 for ABC.

=== Stage ===
Clark Gesner adapted The Letter into a musical called The Bloomers in 2000.

The Santa Fe Opera commissioned composer Paul Moravec and librettist Terry Teachout to write an operatic version. It received its premiere performance on 25 July 2009 in a production directed by Jonathan Kent and starring soprano Patricia Racette as Leslie Crosbie.
