= Sadie Thompson =

Sadie Thompson refers to the main character from "Rain" by W. Somerset Maugham (1921). Several adaptations of that story exist with that title:

- Miss Sadie Thompson, a 1953 film starring Rita Hayworth as Sadie Thompson
- Sadie Thompson (film), a 1928 silent film starring Gloria Swanson as Sadie Thompson
- Sadie Thompson (musical), a 1944 musical starring June Havoc as Sadie Thompson
- Sadie Thompson (opera), a 1997 opera by composer Richard Owen
- Sadie Thompson Inn, a historical inn in American Samoa named after Maugham's Sadie Thompson

== See also ==
- Sada Thompson (1927–2011), American actress
