= Sadie Thompson Inn =

- Sadie Thompson Building
- U.S. National Register of Historic Places
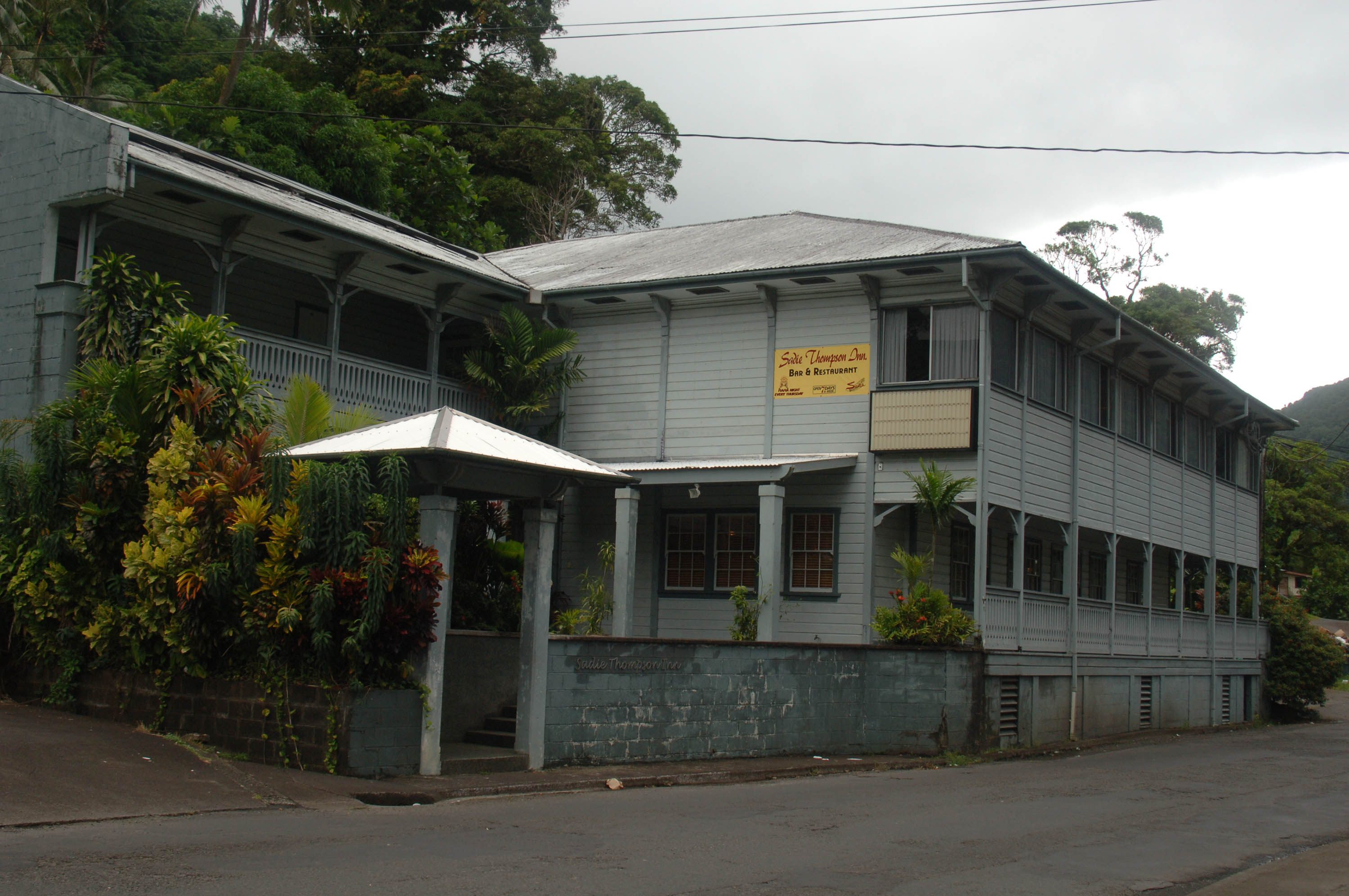
- Apparently a bed and breakfast inn, in 2007

- Location within American Samoa
- Location: Along main road, Malaloa, American Samoa
- Coordinates: 14°16′35″S 170°41′35″W
- Area: Less than 1-acre (4,000 m^{2})
- NRHP reference No.: 03000582
- Added to NRHP: July 2, 2003

The Sadie Thompson Inn is a historic building in Malaloa, one of the constituent villages of Pago Pago in American Samoa. The building is noted as the guest house where from mid-December 1916 author W. Somerset Maugham resided for six weeks during an extended trip through the South Sea Islands. He described it as a "dilapidated lodging house with a corrugated tin roof" and complained that he contracted "a stubborn rash, no doubt fungus" while at the hotel, and of the weeks it took to cure it.

The building was subsequently the setting of his short story "Rain", published in 1921, which depicted a psychological battle of wits between a wayward, on-the-run prostitute, Sadie Thompson, and a conservative, self-righteous missionary. Although conclusive evidence is lacking, Maugham was apparently in residence at the lodging house with a real person named Sadie Thompson, who reportedly had been driven from a red-light district in Honolulu.

Considered one of Maugham's more noteworthy works, the story was later adapted to the stage and brought to the screen three times. The first film was the 1928 silent Sadie Thompson, starring Gloria Swanson as the titular character and Lionel Barrymore as Alfred Davidson, the missionary. Just four years later, in 1932, it was filmed again as Rain, with Joan Crawford as Sadie and Walter Huston, the missionary. And in 1953, Miss Sadie Thompson was released in Technicolor, featuring Rita Hayworth and José Ferrer.

1932 film

The building was listed on the National Register of Historic Places in 2003 as the Sadie Thompson Building. Previously, it had been known as the Meredith Building, the Haleck Building, and as simply Boarding House. At the time of its NRHP listing, the structure was being utilized as a department store on the first floor and a restaurant on its second. It is currently used as a hotel and restaurant.

The Sadie Thompson Inn is historically significant for its association with Somerset Maugham during the waning years of the British Empire in the South Sea Islands. Maugham stayed at the lodging house from December 16, 1916, to January 30, 1917.

== See also ==
- Sadie Thompson
