= Jean Louis =

French costume designer (1907–1997)

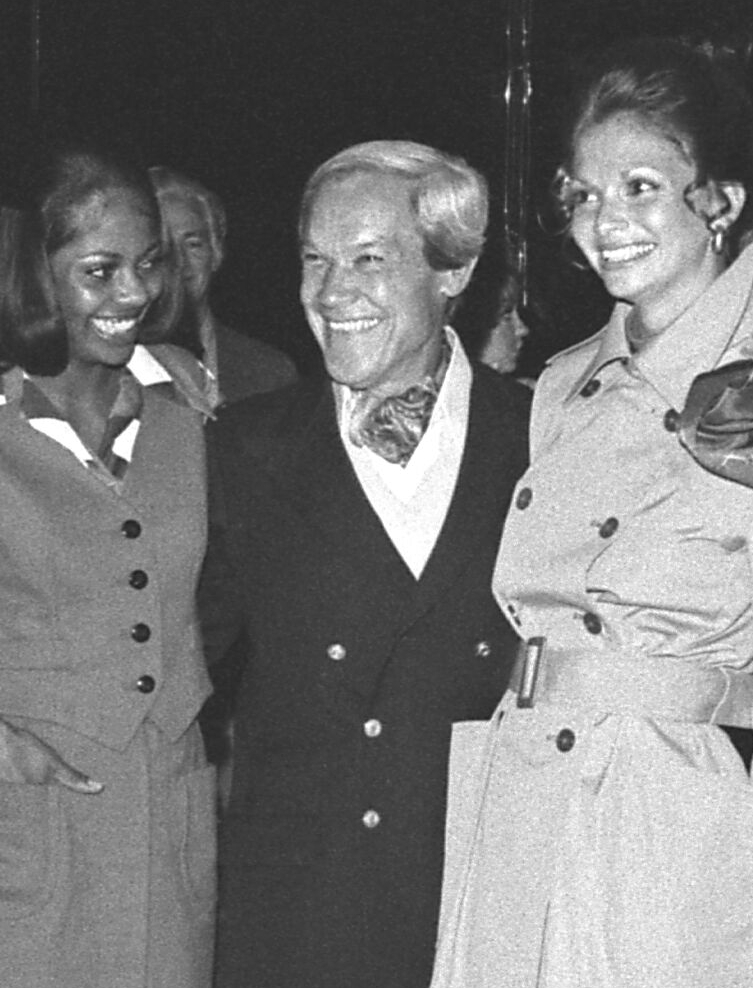
- Jean Louis in 1973
- Born: Jean Louis Berthault; October 5, 1907; Paris, France
- Died: April 20, 1997 (aged 89); Palm Springs, California, U.S.
- Occupation: Costume designer
- Spouses: Marcelle M. Martin (m. 1954; died 1955) Margaret Fisher (m. 1955; died 1989) Loretta Young (m. 1993)

Jean Louis (born Jean Louis Berthault; October 5, 1907 – April 20, 1997) was a French-American costume designer. He won an Academy Award for The Solid Gold Cadillac (1956).

== Life and career ==
Before coming to Hollywood, he worked in New York for fashion entrepreneur Hattie Carnegie, where the clientele included Joan Cohn, the wife of Columbia Pictures studio chief Harry Cohn.

He worked as head designer for Columbia Pictures from 1944 to 1960. His most famous works include Rita Hayworth's black satin strapless dress from Gilda (1946), Marlene Dietrich's celebrated beaded souffle stagewear for her cabaret world tours, as well as the sheer, sparkling gown that Marilyn Monroe wore when she sang "Happy Birthday, Mr. President" to John F. Kennedy in 1962.

The dress was so tight that he is believed to have actually sewn it while Monroe was wearing it. The idea of a dress being a nude color, with crystals coating it, stunned audiences. It gave the illusion that Monroe was nude, except for discretely placed rhinestones covering her head to toe.

Louis had originally designed a version of the dress for Marlene Dietrich, who wore it in her concert shows. An impressed Monroe asked Dietrich about it, who told her how the dress's illusion worked, and sent her to Louis to design a similar dress for her Kennedy appearance. While Dietrich had been seen wearing her version before Monroe, the press coverage surrounding Monroe's appearance at Madison Square Garden in her style of gown swept the globe. This dress became — besides the white one from "The Seven Year Itch" — Marilyn Monroe's most famous dress, selling at auction in 2016 for 4.8 million dollars.

In 1993, four years after the death of his second wife, Louis married former client Loretta Young; they remained married until his death in 1997. He had designed Young's wardrobe for her TV program The Loretta Young Show (1953–61), an anthology show noted for Young's show-opening and closing scenes that had viewers tuning in especially to view her high-fashion outfit for that week. Young was known as the best-dressed actress in America at that time.

For over forty years, Louis designed clothes for almost every star in Hollywood. Around sixty of his designs appeared in movies, and he was eventually nominated for 13 Academy Awards. Some of his clients included Ginger Rogers, Irene Dunne, Lana Turner, Vivien Leigh, Joan Crawford, Julie Andrews, Katharine Hepburn, and Judy Garland. Some of his film credits included, A Star Is Born, Ship of Fools, From Here to Eternity, Thoroughly Modern Millie, and he won an Oscar for his designs in The Solid Gold Cadillac in 1956.

In 1937, a year after Louis immigrated to the United States, he designed the Carnegie suit, a suit that became an icon in the fashion world. The Carnegie suit was one of the first fashions to become very well-liked as an American name design, and its fitted blazer and long pencil skirt was worn by several actresses and society women at the time.

The Duchess of Windsor became one of his most famous clients, as well as the First Lady Nancy Reagan in the 1980s.

== Academy Award nominations ==
Association	Year	Category	Title	Result	Ref.
Academy Awards	1951	Best Costume Design, Black-and-White	Born Yesterday	Nominated	
Academy Awards	1953	Best Costume Design, Black-and-White	Affair in Trinidad	Nominated	
Academy Awards	1954	Best Costume Design, Black-and-White	From Here to Eternity	Nominated	
Academy Awards	1955	Best Costume Design, Black-and-White	It Should Happen to You	Nominated	
Academy Awards	1955	Best Costume Design, Color	A Star Is Born	Nominated	
Academy Awards	1956	Best Costume Design, Black-and-White	Queen Bee	Nominated	
Academy Awards	1957	Best Costume Design, Black-and-White	The Solid Gold Cadillac	Won	
Academy Awards	1958	Best Costume Design	Pal Joey	Nominated	
Academy Awards	1959	Best Costume Design, Black-and-White or Color	Bell, Book and Candle	Nominated	
Academy Awards	1962	Best Costume Design, Color	Back Street	Nominated	
Academy Awards	1962	Best Costume Design, Black-and-White	Judgment at Nuremberg	Nominated	
Academy Awards	1966	Best Costume Design, Black-and-White	Ship of Fools	Nominated	
Academy Awards	1967	Best Costume Design, Color	Gambit	Nominated	
Academy Awards	1968	Best Costume Design	Thoroughly Modern Millie	Nominated	

== Actresses designed for ==
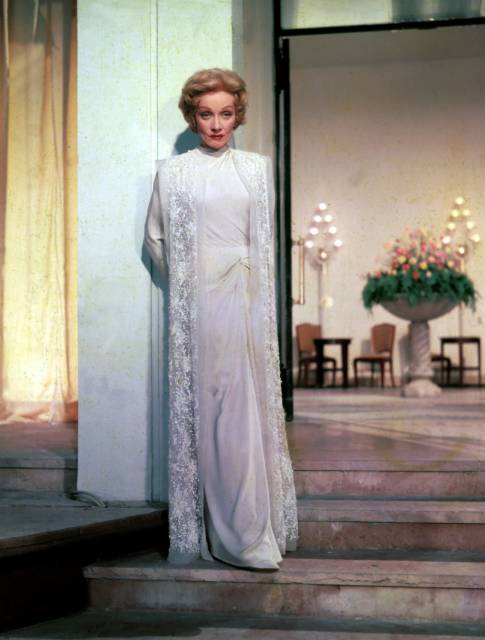
Gown designed by Jean Louis for Marlene Dietrich in The Monte Carlo Story (1956).

- Irene Dunne in Together Again, 1944
- Shirley Temple in Kiss and Tell, 1945
- Rita Hayworth in Tonight and Every Night, 1945, Gilda, 1946, Down To Earth, 1947, The Lady from Shanghai, 1948, The Loves of Carmen, 1948, Affair in Trinidad, 1952, Miss Sadie Thompson, Salome, 1953, Pal Joey, 1957 and They Came to Cordura, 1959
- Claudette Colbert in Tomorrow is Forever 1946
- Judy Holliday in Born Yesterday, 1950 and The Solid Gold Cadillac, 1956
- Lucille Ball in The Magic Carpet, 1951
- Gloria Grahame in The Big Heat, 1953
- Deborah Kerr in From Here to Eternity, 1953
- Jane Wyman in Let's Do It Again, 1953
- Judy Garland in A Star is Born, 1954
- Joan Crawford in Queen Bee, 1955
- Betty Grable in Three for the Show, 1955
- Kim Novak in Picnic, 1955, and Bell, Book, and Candle, 1958
- Kim Novak and Rita Hayworth in Pal Joey, 1957
- Lana Turner in Imitation of Life, 1959
- Doris Day in Pillow Talk (1959), The Thrill of It All (1962), Send Me No Flowers (1964) and Ballad of Josie (1968)
- Loretta Young for The Loretta Young Show, Television series, 1953–1961
- Marlene Dietrich in The Monte Carlo Story, 1956, and Judgment at Nuremberg, 1961
- Susan Hayward in Back Street, 1961
- Marilyn Monroe in The Misfits, 1961, and Something's Got to Give (unfinished), 1962
- Vivien Leigh in Ship of Fools, 1965
- Shirley MacLaine in Gambit, 1966
- Julie Andrews, Mary Tyler Moore, and Carol Channing in Thoroughly Modern Millie, 1967
- Eva Gabor for Green Acres Television series, 1965–1967
- Barbara Bel Geddes for Dallas Television series, 1978–1984 and 1985–1990
