= Man, Woman and Sin =

1927 film

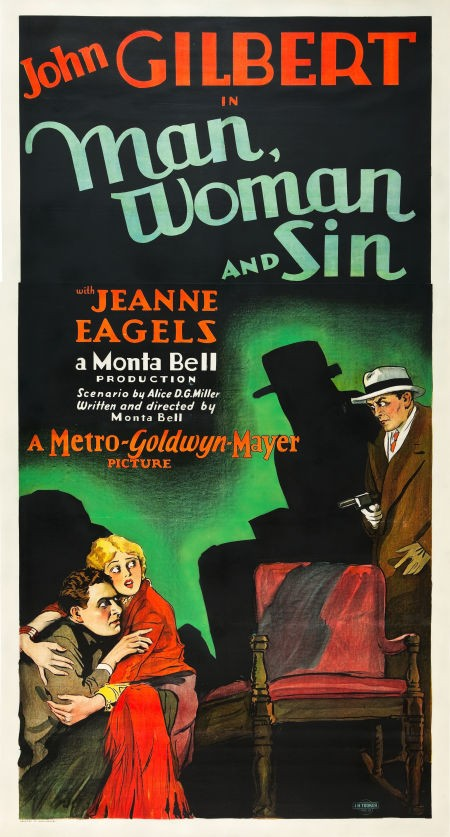
- Directed by: Monta Bell; John Gilbert (uncredited)
- Written by: Monta Bell (story; from John Masefield's The Widow in the Bye Street); Alice D. G. Miller (scenario); John Colton (intertitles)
- Produced by: Louis B. Mayer; Irving Thalberg
- Starring: Jeanne Eagels; John Gilbert
- Cinematography: Percy Hilburn (French)
- Edited by: Blanche Sewell
- Distributed by: Metro-Goldwyn-Mayer
- Release date: November 19, 1927
- Running time: 7 reels (6,280 feet)
- Country: United States
- Languages: Silent (English intertitles)

Man, Woman and Sin (full film)

Man, Woman and Sin is a 1927 American silent drama film produced and distributed by Metro-Goldwyn-Mayer. The film was directed by Monta Bell and John Gilbert, and stars Gilbert and stage actress Jeanne Eagels in one of her rare film appearances.

== Plot ==
Albert Whitcomb is devoted to his mother. He lands a job as a cub reporter at a newspaper and becomes romantically entangled with the society editor, Vera Worth. However, he does not realize that she is the mistress of the paper's owner, Bancroft.

== Cast ==
- John Gilbert as Al Whitcomb
- Jeanne Eagels as Vera Worth
- Gladys Brockwell as Mrs. Whitcomb
- Marc McDermott as Bancroft
- Philip Anderson as Al Whitcomb (as a child)
- Hayden Stevenson as reporter
- Charles K. French as editor

== Preservation ==
A complete print of the film is held in the George Eastman Museum.
