= Rain (opera) =

American opera

Rain, originally entitled Sadie Thompson (1997), is an American opera by Richard Owen, based on the 1921 short story Rain by Somerset Maugham. The first version, named not after the story title, but like the 1928 Gloria Swanson film named after the female leading character, Sadie Thompson, was premiered 20 November 1997. The revised version of the opera, Rain, was premiered by Camerata New York at Alice Tully Hall 20 February 2003. A recording of the 2003 performances was issued on Albany Records.
