= The Monte Carlo Story =

1956 film by Samuel A. Taylor

- Theatrical release poster
- Directed by: Samuel A. Taylor
- Screenplay by: Samuel A. Taylor
- Story by: Samuel A. Taylor; Marcello Girosi; Dino Risi
- Produced by: Marcello Girosi
- Starring: Marlene Dietrich; Vittorio De Sica; Arthur O'Connell; Natalie Trundy; Renato Rascel
- Cinematography: Giuseppe Rotunno
- Edited by: George White
- Music by: Renzo Rossellini
- Color process: Technicolor
- Production companies: Tan Films; Titanus
- Distributed by: United Artists
- Release dates: 22 December 1956 (Italy); 9 October 1957 (United States)
- Running time: 96 minutes
- Countries: Italy; United States
- Language: English

The Monte Carlo Story is a 1956 romantic comedy film starring Marlene Dietrich and Vittorio De Sica, with Arthur O'Connell, Natalie Trundy, and Renato Rascel in support. The picture was written and directed by Samuel A. Taylor, based on an original story by Taylor, Marcello Girosi, and Dino Risi. Marcello Girosi produced the film, which was the first shot in the Technirama process. Jean Louis designed the costumes.

== Plot ==
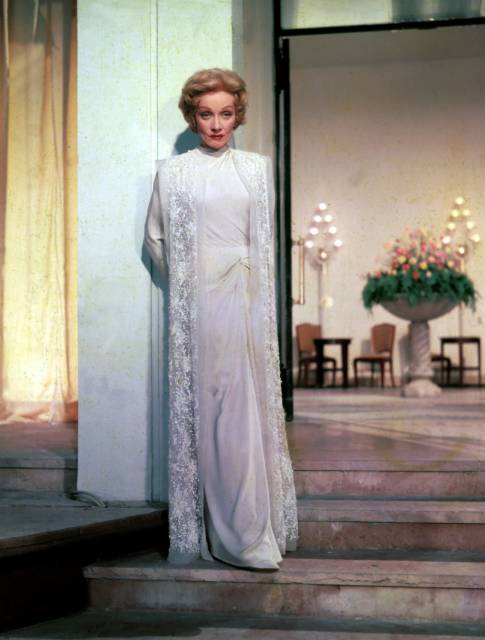
Marlene Dietrich as Maria de Crevecoeur

Handsome middle-aged Count Della Fiabe has squandered his fortune on the gambling tables of Monte Carlo and has nothing left but his title, a yacht with no motor, and friends carrying him in the hopes his luck returns.

The glamorous Marquess Maria de Crevecoeur was also once wealthy, but has likewise gambled away all her late husband’s fortune. She keeps trying to win it back, without success, and has pawned all her jewelry in the process.

She arrives in Monte Carlo effectively without a cent, getting by on her title and the contrails of her previous high-rolling stays.

Her pawnbroker follows from Paris immediately on her heels, dogging her to pay outstanding debts.

To recoup their losses, and get the Count back on his feet, his friends seek to introduce him to a wealthy woman he can court and marry. Not knowing of her circumstances, they arrange for him to sidle up to the Marquess.

It works, and the two become attracted to one another. Relieved to have found a solution to her financial woes, the Marquess drops her guard and accepts the Count’s proposal of marriage. An honorable man beneath it all, his better side comes to the fore and he confesses his deception.

Taken aback, the Marquess denounces him, only to have her own charade exposed by an inconvenient visit of her pawnbroker.

An American millionaire with more money than he knows to what to do with, Homer Hinckley, arrives in Monte Carlo with an enormous new sailing yacht and an entourage that includes his sister and lovely young daughter, Jane. A widower the same age as both the Marquess and the Count, he is uncouth but friendly, generous, and loves to have fun.

After holing the Count’s yacht with his own, he invites the couple - who pose as brother and sister - to stay aboard his while the Count’s is repaired. He immediately has eyes for Maria, who sets her cap for his fortune.

Though she is far too young, the naïve but anxious Jane is drawn to the Count and pursues him.

While he appreciates the attention, he cannot return her affection; his heart is still with the Marquess.

Ultimately, Jane discovers this, and attempts to help the Count in the hopes he will change his mind.

When the time comes to leave, Homer proposes to the Marquess, who accepts and embarks on his yacht for America and a home together in Muncie, Indiana.

Just outside the harbor, she realizes her heart is still with the Count, and requests to be put ashore. The giant schooner comes about, but before it can make land the Count appears in his yacht, comes alongside, and the Marquess jumps aboard.

== Cast ==
- Marlene Dietrich as Marquess Maria de Crevecoeur
- Vittorio De Sica as Conte Dino della Fiaba
- Arthur O'Connell as Mr. Homer Hinkley
- Jane Rose as Mrs. Edith Freeman
- Mischa Auer as Hector
- Clelia Matania as Sophia
- Truman Smith as Mr. Fred Freeman
- Alberto Rabagliati as Albert
- Carlo Rizzo as Henri
- Frank Colson as Walter Peeples
- Natalie Trundy as Jane Hinkley
- Renato Rascel as Duval
