= Rain (1932 film) =

1932 film

- theatrical film poster
- Directed by: Lewis Milestone (uncredited)
- Screenplay by: Maxwell Anderson
- Based on: Rain 1922 play by John Colton; Miss Thompson 1921 story in The Smart Set by W. Somerset Maugham
- Produced by: Lewis Milestone
- Starring: Joan Crawford; Walter Huston; William Gargan
- Cinematography: Oliver T. Marsh
- Edited by: W. Duncan Mansfield
- Music by: Alfred Newman
- Distributed by: United Artists
- Release date: October 12, 1932
- Running time: 92 minutes
- Country: United States
- Language: English
- Budget: $591,000
- Box office: $704,000

Rain is a 1932 pre-Code drama film that stars Joan Crawford as prostitute Sadie Thompson. Directed by Lewis Milestone and set in the South Seas, the production was filmed in part at Santa Catalina Island and what became Crystal Cove State Park in California. The film also features Walter Huston in the role of a conflicted missionary who insists that Sadie end her evil ways, but whose own moral standards and self-righteous behavior steadily decay. Crawford was loaned out by MGM to United Artists for this film.

The plot of the film is based on the 1922 play Rain by John Colton and Clemence Randolph, which in turn was based on the 1921 short story "Miss Thompson" (later retitled "Rain") by W. Somerset Maugham. Actress Jeanne Eagels had played the role on stage. Other movie versions of the story include: a 1928 silent film titled Sadie Thompson starring Gloria Swanson, and Miss Sadie Thompson (1953), which starred Rita Hayworth.

== Plot ==
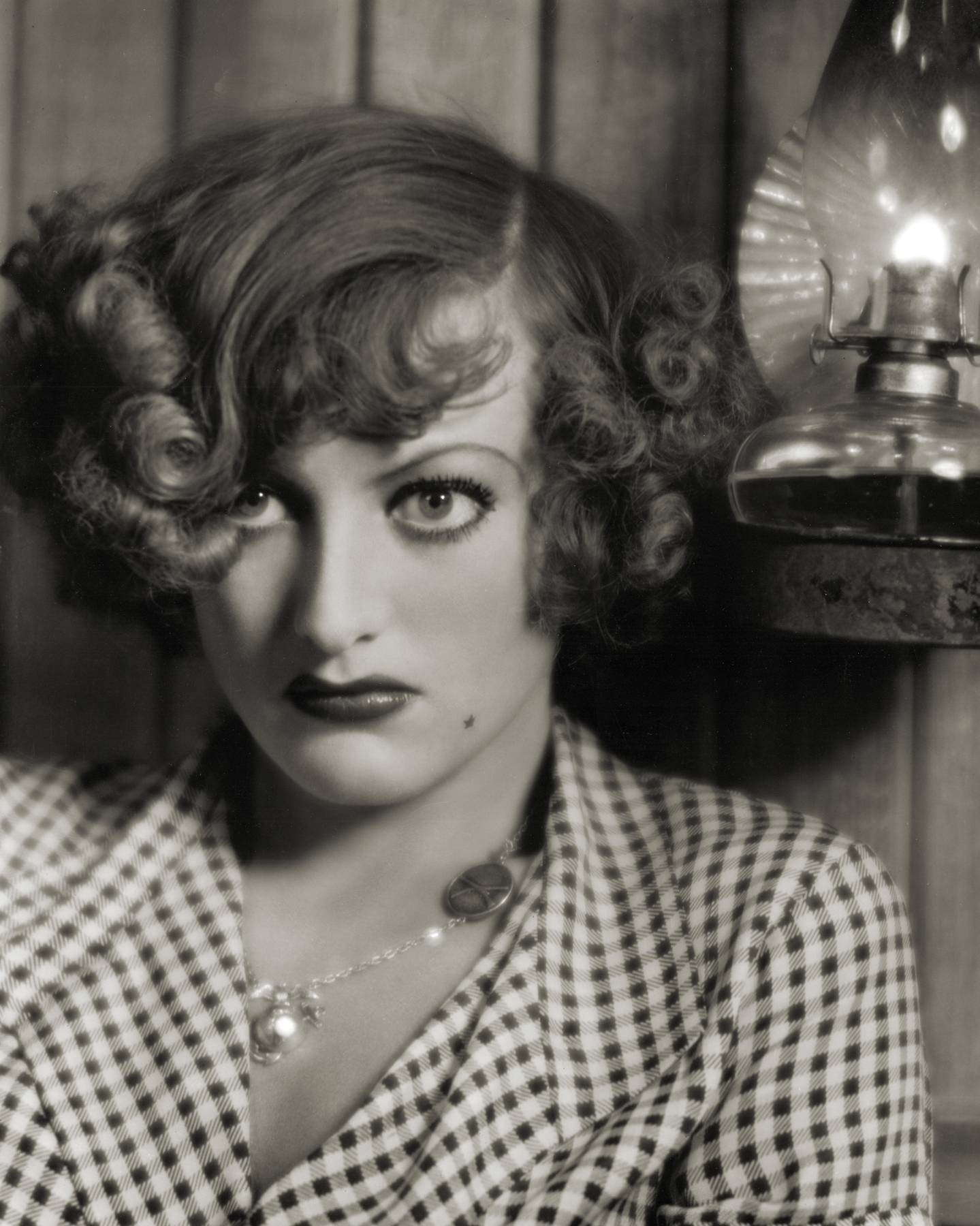
Crawford as Sadie

A westbound ship en route to Apia, Samoa, is temporarily stranded at nearby Pago Pago due to a possible cholera outbreak on board. Among the passengers are Alfred Davidson, a self-righteous missionary, his wife, and Sadie Thompson, a prostitute. Thompson passes the time partying and drinking with the American Marines stationed on the island. Sergeant Tim O'Hara, nicknamed by Sadie as "Handsome", falls in love with her.

Her wild behavior soon becomes more than the Davidsons can stand and Mr. Davidson confronts Sadie, resolving to save her soul. When she dismisses his offer, Davidson has the Governor order her deported to San Francisco, California, where she is wanted for an unspecified crime (for which she says she was framed). She begs Davidson to allow her to remain on the island a few more days; her plan is to flee to Sydney, Australia. During a heated argument with Davidson, she experiences a religious conversion and agrees to return to San Francisco and the jail sentence awaiting her there.

The evening before she is to leave, Sergeant O'Hara asks Sadie to marry him and offers to hide her until the Sydney boat sails, but she refuses. Later, while native drums beat at an uninhibited native dance, the repressed Davidson, overcome by his lust for Sadie, enters her room and proceeds to rape her offscreen amid the beating of the drums. The next morning he is found dead on the beach, his throat slit: a suicide. After Davidson's assault and subsequent death, his hypocrisy and weakness allow Thompson to return to her old self and she goes off to Sydney with O'Hara to start a new life.

Rain

== Cast ==
- Joan Crawford as Sadie Thompson
- Walter Huston as Alfred Davidson
- Fred Howard as Hodgson
- Ben Hendricks Jr. as Griggs
- William Gargan as Sergeant Tim O'Hara
- Mary Shaw as Ameena
- Guy Kibbee as Joe Horn
- Kendall Lee as Mrs MacPhail
- Beulah Bondi as Mrs Davidson
- Matt Moore as Dr Robert MacPhail
- Walter Catlett as Master Bates

== Copyright status ==
In 1960, the film entered the public domain in the United States because the claimants did not renew its copyright registration in the 28th year after publication.

== Reception ==
Rain was not well received – either critically or financially – upon initial release. The unglamorous role for Crawford, and bold story (religious hypocrisy being its main theme), caught Depression-era audiences off guard.

Motion Picture Herald commented,

Because the producers have made such a strong attempt to establish the stern impressiveness of the story, it is rather slow. In its drive to become powerful, it appears to have lost the spark of spontaneity. ... Joan Crawford and Walter Huston are satisfactory.

Variety noted,

It turns out to be a mistake to have assigned the Sadie Thompson role to Miss Crawford. It shows her off unfavorably. The dramatic significance of it all is beyond her range. ... [Director] Milestone tried to achieve action with the camera, but wears the witnesses down with words. Joan Crawford's get-up as the light lady is extremely bizarre. Pavement pounders don't quite trick themselves up as fantastically as all that. In commercial favor of Rain is the general repute of the theme and Miss Crawford's personal following, but the finished product will not help either.

=== Box office ===
The film earned $538,000 in the United States and Canada and $166,000 elsewhere, resulting in a loss of $198,000.
