= Jo Ann Greer =

American jazz singer (1927–2001)

- Born: Katherine Joan Greer; April 3, 1927; Atlantic City, New Jersey, U.S.
- Died: May 24, 2001 (aged 74); Los Angeles, California, U.S.
- Other name: Joan Greer
- Occupations: Band singer, ghost singer
- Years active: 1949–1992
- Spouse(s): Freddie Slack (m. 1950; div. 1951); Stan Stout (m. 1952; div. 1954); Mickey McMahan (m. 1957; div. 1973)
- Children: 3

Katherine Joan Greer (April 3, 1927 – May 24, 2001), known professionally as Jo Ann Greer, (Note: Prior to her September 1951 debut with Sonny Burke's big band (that is to say, beginning no later than the fall of 1949 and extending at least through midsummer, 1951—that being the period of her employment by, and marriage to, bandleader Freddie Slack, as well as her subsequent signing by Burke), Greer was billed exclusively as Joan Greer.) was an American ghost and big band singer, known both for her long tenure as featured vocalist with Les Brown and His Band of Renown and as Rita Hayworth's most frequent onscreen singing voice. Others who borrowed her vocal stylings include Kim Novak, Gloria Grahame, Esther Williams, June Allyson and Claire Trevor.

== Early life and career ==
Born on April 3, 1927, in Atlantic City, New Jersey, and raised in Los Angeles, Greer was the daughter of William J. Greer and Florence M. Obenour. Following her graduation from John Marshall High School, Greer first worked as a secretary, then took a job as a chambermaid in Laguna so that she could spend her off-hours at the beach.

Jo Ann Greer initially became known to Hollywood casting people from an early marriage to pianist Freddie Slack in the 1940s and later through her long employment with Les Brown and His Band of Renown. Following some early appearances with Sonny Burke and his orchestra, Greer recorded for Decca Records and joined Ray Anthony's band, with whom she scored her two biggest hits, "Wild Horses" (No. 28 in Billboard) and "The Hokey Pokey" in 1953. She was unhappy here, and, in July 1953, she replaced Lucy Ann Polk as vocalist with Les Brown's band. They made numerous singles for Coral Records and later Capitol Records and toured internationally for nearly 40 years, well into the early 1990s. She won the 1956 Down Beat Readers Poll for "best girl band vocalist." Greer became increasingly associated with her distinctive version of Brown's hit song "Sentimental Journey", which he had originally recorded with Doris Day.

Greer's other career was as a ghost singer for famous movie stars. In 1952 Rita Hayworth had returned to Hollywood following the break-up of her marriage to Prince Aly Khan and began work on her comeback film, Affair in Trinidad. After several failed attempts to let Hayworth try to do her own singing, musical director Morris Stoloff brought in Greer, who was deemed a good vocal match and even had a slight lisp similar to Hayworth's. Greer's vocals on "Trinidad Lady" and "I've Been Kissed Before" helped the movie become a success, out-grossing Gilda by more than a million dollars.

Greer was in demand as a dubber, especially at Columbia Pictures, and went on to do the vocal tracks for such stars as Gloria Grahame (in Naked Alibi, Universal-International), Kim Novak (in 5 Against the House), May Wynn (in The Caine Mutiny), Esther Williams (in Jupiter's Darling, MGM), June Allyson (in The Opposite Sex, MGM), and Susan Kohner (in Imitation of Life, Universal-International). Other dubbing work at Columbia included the Dan Dailey-starrer Meet Me at the Fair (for Carole Mathews) and Frankie Laine's Rainbow 'Round My Shoulder (for Charlotte Austin, daughter of entertainer/songwriter Gene Austin).

Greer also sang for Hayworth in two more of her biggest successes, Miss Sadie Thompson and Pal Joey. When the latter two soundtrack albums were released by Mercury Records and Capitol Records, respectively, however, Greer's name was not even listed, in order to preserve the illusion that it was Hayworth who sang. Greer and Hayworth enjoyed a good working relationship on all three of the films they did together. Hayworth would attend Greer's recording sessions and dance barefoot for her in front of the microphone so that Greer could follow her breathing and movements as she sang.

Stoloff also utilized Greer's talents for two projects on the newly formed Colpix Records label, having her record "My Funny Valentine" (he supposedly had never liked the version done by another singer for Kim Novak in Pal Joey) and Hayworth's signature song "Put the Blame on Mame" for the album Voices, Soundtracks and Themes From Great Movies (Greer's name was once more left off both the label and the jacket). The second Colpix album was more ambitious, an original film noir-style musical entitled The Naked City, named to tie in with the popular film and TV series, with music by George Duning, text and lyrics by Ned Washington, and narration by veteran actor John McIntire. The singing was done by Greer, James Darren, and the Jud Conlon Singers. This time their names were listed in tiny print on the record label but left off of the LP cover. It was released in stereo as Colpix SCP 505.

Greer never got to record a vocal album of her own, but some of her many singles have been reissued on CD, most of her films are available on DVD, and many CD collections have been released of her broadcasts and live performances with the bands of Anthony, Burke, and Brown, including shows from the Hollywood Palladium, Denver's Elitch Gardens, and the 1983 Aurex Jazz Festival in Tokyo, Japan. She also made one on-screen appearance as herself in the 1957 Universal-International musical short Dance Demons, in which she sings "Moonlight in Vermont" with the Les Brown band.

In 1991, while still performing occasionally with the Brown band (now mostly led by Les, Jr.), she was part of a successful cabaret show called Voices, which also featured two other prominent ghost singers, Annette Warren and India Adams. They were invited to perform at one of that year's Oscar events by the Motion Picture Academy.

A CD compilation of her work was produced by her last manager Alan Eichler and released in 2012 by Jasmine Records.

== Personal life ==
On April 12, 1950, Greer married her employer, bandleader/boogie woogie pianist Freddie Slack. On July 24 of the following year, she succeeded in obtaining a divorce, on the grounds that Slack had become abusive just days after the wedding, routinely swearing at—and/or demeaning—her on the bandstand within easy earshot of the audience. "He was jealous, and I was afraid to talk to anyone," she continued, adding, "I think he's a genius, but one cannot cope with his eccentricities." In an interview conducted nine months after her divorce, when asked whether romance was in the offing with any of her male bandmates, Greer replied, "Gosh, no! I'm interested only in my work. Like my boss, Al Pearce, they're wonderful fellows to work with, but I'm strictly a career girl. Definitely!" The interviewer pressed further, noting that "some man or men ought to be interested in you."

I’ll say I have some men interested in me. Six, in fact. Six well-known songwriters: Don Raye, Gene de Paul, Harold Spina, Bob Russell, Ben Oakland, and Paul F. Webster have ‘adopted’ me as my godfathers. They coach me, build me up in the music business, advise me, write special material, and have made possible many of my band jobs, recordings, and radio appearances. As far as other men go, I have become an expert at spear-fishing. I can handle a spear on any kind of fish, whether it’s a poor old mackerel or an octopus with lots of arms.

On October 3, 1954, Greer entered into her second marriage, with trumpeter and Les Brown bandmate Stan Stout. It ended on May 25, 1956, when Greer waived alimony while obtaining an uncontested divorce. The thrust of her argument was quoted by the Associated Press:

He felt that a woman should be under the subjugation of her husband. I just couldn't reason with him or talk over anything with him.

June 10, 1957, marked the beginning of Greer's third and final marriage, to yet another Brown bandmate/trumpeter, Clinton Owen "Mickey" McMahan. MacMahan later became a regular on the Lawrence Welk Show, where Greer herself would make several guest appearances over the next decade, concluding with the show's 1967 season premiere. The marriage itself concluded in divorce in March 1973, albeit not before producing three offspring: a daughter Jayme and two sons, Bryan and Patrick.

Greer died in 2001, following a long bout with Alzheimer's disease.

== Filmography ==
=== Films ===
- Rainbow 'Round My Shoulder (1952) – Cathy Blake (Charlotte Austin's singing voice)
- Affair in Trinidad (1952) – Chris Emery (Rita Hayworth's singing voice)
- Meet Me at the Fair (1953) – Clara Brink (Carole Mathews' singing voice)
- City Beneath the Sea (1953) – Venita aka Mary Lou Beetle (Suzan Ball's singing voice) (Note: Although there appear to be no contemporaneous reports of Ball's one musical number, "Handle With Care,' being dubbed by anyone, both IMDb and author Laura Wagner state that this is the case. Moreover, while neither source identifies the actual vocalist, the piece and performance in very much the same vein as—and sounds remarkably similar to—the Greer-dubbed Hayworth vocal in Affair in Trinidad, released 9 months before, and happens to be the handiwork of the same studio and musical director, Universal International and Joseph Gershenson, responsible for the Greer-dubbed Meet Me at the Fair (1953) and Naked Alibi (1954).)
- Miss Sadie Thompson (1953) – Sadie Thompson (Rita Hayworth's singing voice)
- The Caine Mutiny (1954) – May Wynn (May Wynn's singing voice)
- Naked Alibi (1954) – Marianna (Gloria Grahame's singing voice)
- Jupiter's Darling (1954) - Amytus (Esther Williams' singing voice)
- 5 Against the House (1955) – Kay Greylek (Kim Novak's singing voice)
- The Opposite Sex (1956) – Kay Hilliard (June Allyson's singing voice on "A Perfect Love")
- Pal Joey (1957) – Vera Prentice-Simpson (Rita Hayworth's singing voice)
- Imitation of Life (1959) – Sara Jane Johnson, age 18 (Susan Kohner's singing voice)

=== Television ===
- The Al Pearce Show (morning version) (1952) – Self
- Route 66
  - Ep 1.14 "Play It Glissando" (1961) – Kitty Parker (Barbara Bostock's singing voice)
  - Eps 1.16 and 1.17 "Fly Away Home: Parts I and II (1961) – Christina (Dorothy Malone's singing voice)
- The Investigators
  - "A New Sound for the Blues" (1961) – Kitty Harper (Claire Trevor's singing voice)
- The Lawrence Welk Show
  - Three episodes (1967) – Self
