= Mickey McMahan =

American trumpeter

Mickey McMahan (August 23, 1930 – June 11, 2008) was an American born big band musician who played with the Lawrence Welk orchestra from 1966 to 1982. His instrument was the trumpet.

== Biography ==
Born Clinton O. McMahan in Dallas, Texas, he moved with his family to Phoenix, Arizona. He learned to play the trumpet from his mother, who grew up in an orphanage. After high school, following a stint in the US Army, he played with Les Brown's band on The Steve Allen Show and later toured with Brown's band on overseas USO tours, usually accompanying Bob Hope. He married longtime Brown vocalist Jo Ann Greer. He also played with the Freddy Martin, Tex Beneke, Billy Vaughn, and Stan Kenton bands.

He joined Lawrence Welk and his Champagne Music Makers in 1966 as first trumpet, performing both on television show and live concert dates.

In 2008 Mickey died at home in Van Nuys, California, from complications of neuropathy. He is survived by his three children, Jayme, Bryan, Patrick and stepson Steve Land.
