= Doris Patston =

American actress

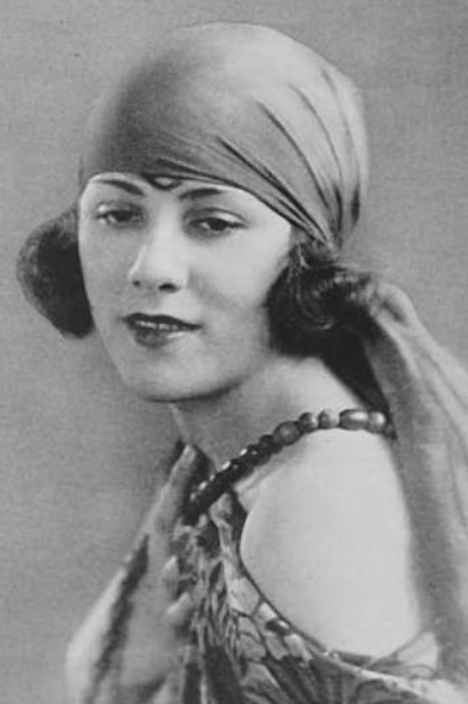
- Doris Patston, from a 1925 publication
- Born: 28 May 1904; Islington, England, U.K.
- Died: 12 June 1957; New York, New York, U.S.
- Occupation(s): Actress, singer, dancer, pianist

Doris May Patston Sheehan (28 May 1904 – 12 June 1957) was an English actress, dancer, pianist, and singer, active on the London, New York, and Chicago stages from the 1910s into the 1950s.

== Early life and education ==
Patston was born in Islington, the daughter of Edward Henry Patston and Clara Eliza Denton Patston. She studied voice and piano with Landon Ronald at the Guildhall School of Music in London.

== Career ==
Patston was a concert pianist and a dancer as a young woman. Later, she was an actress and singer on Broadway, in both musicals and dramas. Her New York debut came in 1925 in Florenz Ziegfeld's comedy Louie the 14th, starring Leon Errol. She also appeared in shows at the St. Louis Municipal Opera.

== Stage credits ==
- Cherry (1920)
- The Tempest (1921)
- Music Box Revue (1923)
- The Babes in the Wood (1923)
- Little Nellie Kelly (1923–1924)
- The Punch Bowl (1924–1925)
- Louie the 14th (1925)
- Katja (also known as Katja the Dancer; 1926–1927)
- Lovely Lady (1927–1928; 1929, Chicago)
- The Circus Princess (1930, St. Louis)
- Smiling Faces (1932)
- The Blue Paradise (1932, St. Louis)
- Nina Rosa (1933, St. Louis)
- Bitter Sweet (1933, St. Louis)
- All the King's Horses (1934)
- Frederika (1937)
- A Kiss for Cinderella (1942)
- The New Moon (1942)
- Flare Path (1942)
- Sheppey (1944)
- Sadie Thompson (1944–1945)
- Thérèse (1945)
- The Chocolate Soldier (1946–1947)
- Toplitzky of Notre Dame (1946–1947)
- My Romance (1948–1949)
- Gigi (1951–1952)
- The Starcross Story (1954)
- Witness for the Prosecution (1954–1956, Chicago)

== Personal life ==
Patston married actor Jack Sheehan in 1929, while they were both in the cast of Lovely Lady in Chicago. She died in 1957, at the age of 53, in New York City.
