= The Careless Years =

1957 film by Arthur Hiller

- film poster
- Directed by: Arthur Hiller
- Written by: John Howard Lawson; Mitch Lindemann
- Produced by: Edward Lewis
- Starring: Dean Stockwell; Natalie Trundy; John Larch
- Cinematography: Sam Leavitt
- Edited by: Leon Barsha
- Music by: Leith Stevens
- Production companies: Bryna Productions; Michael Productions
- Distributed by: United Artists
- Release date: September 2, 1957 (United States)
- Running time: 70 minutes
- Country: United States
- Language: English

The Careless Years is a 1957 melodrama film directed by Arthur Hiller and produced by Edward Lewis. It was Hiller's debut as a director of film, though he had previously helmed numerous feature-length TV productions. The film stars Dean Stockwell, Natalie Trundy and John Larch and was distributed by United Artists.

== Plot ==
Jerry Vernon and Emily Meredith, two high-school seniors from different social groups, make a date. Jerry begins to fall for Emily when she resists his amorous advances, and he decides that they should marry immediately. Both sets of parents object to the sudden proposal. He persuades her to travel to Mexico with him in order to wed, but they ultimately realize that it is best to wait until they are older.

== Cast ==
- Dean Stockwell as Jerry Vernon
- Natalie Trundy as Emily "Miley" Meredith
- John Larch as Sam Vernon
- Barbara Billingsley as Helen Meredith
- John Stevenson as Charles Meredith
- Virginia Christine as Mathilda Vernon
- Maureen Cassidy as Harriet
- Mason Alan Dinehart as Bob Williams III

== Production ==
The film originally was titled The Young Lovers.

Natalie Trundy was 16 years old and only had made one film when Bryna Productions signed her to a five-year contract. Former child actor Dean Stockwell was signed to a five-year contract.

The Careless Years was the first feature film directed by Arthur Hiller. He recalled that he was offered the job, he "read the script, and I liked it a lot, but I had reservations. And I thought 'Do I tell him [the producer] about my reservations? Or do I pretend I really just love it? I don't want to lose the job'. Finally I went about it honestly and just told them just what my feelings were. Those are my feelings, and I'm doing a rewrite, just on those items."

== Reception ==
In a contemporary review for The New York Times, critic Richard W. Nason wrote: "The pace is slow, the writing uninspired and the approach to the issue is often naive and repetitious. ... The young lovers are set in contrast to their carefree contemporaries who are "just out for kicks." They are in love, they think, and are willing to defy every reality to get married and express themselves. They are shaken to their senses in time, and avow to await their turn for adult responsibilities. That is valid enough, but it is not as world-shaking as those concerned with the film seem to think."

== See also ==
- List of American films of 1957
