= Pal Joey (film) =

1957 film directed by George Sidney

- Theatrical release poster
- Directed by: George Sidney
- Screenplay by: Dorothy Kingsley
- Based on: Pal Joey; 1940 play Pal Joey; 1940 novel by John O'Hara
- Produced by: Fred Kohlmar
- Starring: Rita Hayworth; Frank Sinatra; Kim Novak
- Cinematography: Harold Lipstein
- Edited by: Viola Lawrence; Jerome Thoms
- Color process: Technicolor
- Production companies: Essex Productions; George Sidney Productions
- Distributed by: Columbia Pictures
- Release date: October 25, 1957 (United States)
- Running time: 109 minutes
- Country: United States
- Language: English
- Budget: $3 million
- Box office: $7 million (rentals)

Pal Joey is a 1957 American musical comedy film directed by George Sidney, loosely adapted from the Rodgers and Hart musical play of the same name, and starring Rita Hayworth, Frank Sinatra, and Kim Novak.

Sinatra won the Golden Globe Award for Best Actor – Motion Picture Musical or Comedy for his role as the wise-cracking, hard-bitten Joey Evans. Along with its strong box-office success, Pal Joey earned four Academy Award nominations and one Golden Globe Award nomination.

Jo Ann Greer sang for Hayworth, as she had done in Affair in Trinidad (1952) and Miss Sadie Thompson (1953). Novak's singing voice was dubbed by Trudy Stevens (Trudy Erwin, born Virginia Lee Erwin). The choreography was managed by Hermes Pan. Nelson Riddle handled the musical arrangements for the Rodgers and Hart standards "The Lady Is a Tramp", "I Didn't Know What Time It Was", "I Could Write a Book", and "There's a Small Hotel".

Pal Joey is one of Sinatra's few post-From Here to Eternity films that did not give him top billing, which went to Hayworth. Sinatra was, by this time, a bigger star. When asked about the billing, Sinatra replied, "Ladies first." He said as it was a Columbia Pictures film, Hayworth should have top billing because "For years, she was Columbia Pictures" and being billed "between" Hayworth and Novak was "a sandwich I don't mind being stuck in the middle of." Hayworth had garnered top-billing status in Columbia Pictures' films starting in 1944's Cover Girl through the 1959 film They Came to Cordura with Gary Cooper.

Sinatra's earnings from the film paid for his new home in Palm Springs. He was so delighted that he also built a restaurant there dedicated to the film, named Pal Joey's.

== Plot ==
Joey Evans, a womanizing nightclub singer, is thrown out of town for romancing the mayor's underage daughter, and forced to board a train to San Francisco. There, he reconnects with his friend Ned Galvin, a band leader for the Barbary Coast Club. When the nightclub's emcee fails to appear, Joey takes the position and is hired on the spot by Mike Miggins, the nightclub owner.

Later that night, Ned lands another gig at a children's charity event on Nob Hill, and brings Joey and Linda English, a naïve chorus girl, along. The event falls short of its intended fundraising goal, in which Joey has the attendees raise thousands to have Vera Prentice-Simpson, a widowed socialite and former striptease dancer, perform a routine. Later that night, Joey and Ned escort Linda to her rooming house, where Joey wakes up a landlady after noticing an open vacancy. The landlady promptly has Joey share an apartment with Linda, to which he agrees.

Over time, Joey and Linda bond, and she persuades him to purchase a white terrier, naming him "Snuffy." At the nightclub, Joey reconnects with Vera and the two flirt. Vera then leaves without paying, and Mike fires Joey. However, Joey strikes a deal: if he can convince Vera to return to the nightclub by Saturday, he can keep his job and get a pay raise. Joey arrives at Vera's mansion, and informs her that he has been fired because of her and intends to leave for New York. However, Vera makes an impromptu appearance at the nightclub where Joey performs the song "The Lady Is a Tramp".

Joey and Vera leave the nightclub, and she takes him aboard her yacht. There, Joey reveals his ambition to open his own club named "Chez Joey" on Nob Hill and wants Vera as his sponsor. She agrees, kisses Joey, and wakes up the next morning in love. Joey returns to his rooming house, and tells Linda about his plans about his new nightclub. Soon after, Joey hires Ned and the chorus girls from the Barbary Coast Club, with Linda hired as a featured singer. Vera, who is jealous for Joey, demands that he fire Linda. Joey persuades Linda to perform as a strip dancer, and lies to Vera claiming Linda has quit.

That same night, while Vera entertains attendees at her mansion, Joey and Linda are together aboard the yacht until she passes out drunk. The next morning, Linda wakes up ashamed of her behavior, and thanks Joey for not taking advantage of her. She evidently agrees to perform a striptease, and rehearses the number before opening night as Vera walks in, and as the staff looks on. Embarrassed for her, Joey halts the number and comforts Linda in her dressing room. Vera calls Joey in, and demands he fire Linda for good. Joey however refuses, and Vera decides to close the nightclub.

Linda meets with Vera and persuades her to open the nightclub as planned. Vera agrees to open the club on the condition Joey marries her, but Joey rejects the offer. He returns to the nightclub imagining what could have been, and prepares to leave for New York. Before he does, Linda catches up with him, and the two decide to perform together as an act.

== Cast ==
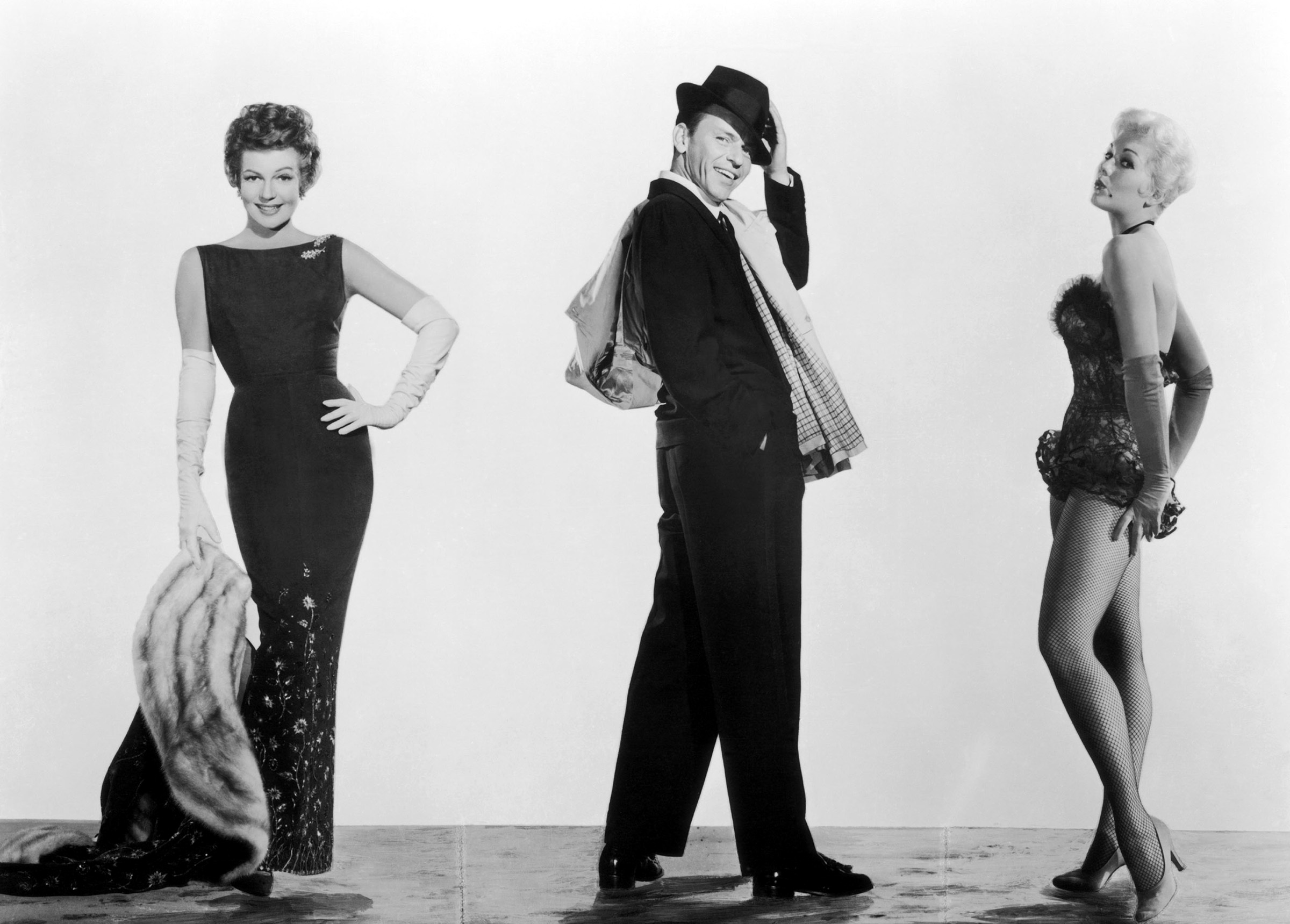
Left to right: Hayworth, Sinatra, and Novak in a publicity shot

- Rita Hayworth as Vera Prentice-Simpson
- Frank Sinatra as "Pal" Joey Evans
- Kim Novak (voice dubbed by Trudy Stevens) as Linda English
- Barbara Nichols as Gladys
- Bobby Sherwood as Ned Galvin
- Hank Henry as Mike Miggins
- Elizabeth Patterson as Mrs. Casey
- Judy Dan as hat check girl (uncredited)
- Bek Nelson as Lola (uncredited)

Note: Robert Reed made his unbilled feature film debut as the boy friend sitting at the front couple's table while Sinatra sang "I Didn't Know What Time It Was."

== Production ==
Trailer for the film

According to Dorothy Kingsley, who wrote the script, the film was meant to star Kirk Douglas and be directed by George Cukor. However Lilian Burns, who was Harry Cohn's assistant, felt only Frank Sinatra could play the role. Sinatra and Cohn were feuding but Kingsley and Burns persuaded Cohn to accept Sinatra. Burns' husband George Sidney ultimately directed the film.

George Sidney enjoyed working with Frank Sinatra. They would start in the afternoon as that was when Sinatra preferred to work and film until early in the morning.

Opening establishing shots feature the International Settlement entertainment district in San Francisco.

== Adaptation from the stage play ==
The happy ending of the film contrasts with the conclusion of the stage musical, where Joey is left alone at the end.

The transformation of Joey into a "nice guy" diverges from the stage musical, where Joey's character is an anti-hero. Joey is also older in the film. On stage he was played by 28-year old Gene Kelly, here, 42-year old Sinatra takes the reins.

The film differs from the stage musical in other key points: the setting was moved from Chicago to San Francisco, and on stage Joey was a dancer. The plot of the film drops a blackmail attempt, and two roles prominent on stage were changed: Melba (a reporter) was cut, and Gladys became a minor character. Linda became a naive chorus girl instead of an innocent stenographer and some of the lyrics to "Bewitched, Bothered and Bewildered" were changed. Also in the film, Vera Prentice-Simpson is a wealthy widow and former stripper (billed as Vanessa the Undresser) and thus gets to sing the song "Zip". (Since that number requires an authentic burlesque drummer to mime the bumps and grinds, the extra playing the drums is disconcertingly swapped with a professional session musician Jimmy Fernandes in a jump cut). In the stage musical, Vera isn't jealous of Linda, with whom she has a pleasant conversation about Joey, since they have both seen through his act but still find him appealing. After politely breaking things off with Joey because she'd been blackmailed over the affair and isn't feeling so bewitched anymore, she offers him the club, no strings attached, to show there's no hard feelings on her side. He's very offended by this brush-off, speaks rudely to her, at which point she coldly withdraws the offer, leaving him with nothing.

== Song list ==
Of the original 14 Rodgers and Hart songs, eight remained, but with two as instrumental background, and four songs were added from other shows. The music was supervised by Morris Stoloff and adapted by George Duning and Riddle, with Arthur Morton contributing orchestrations.

1. Pal Joey: Main Title
2. "That Terrific Rainbow" - chorus girls and Linda English*
3. "I Didn't Know What Time It Was" (introduced in the 1939 musical Too Many Girls) - Joey Evans
4. "Do It the Hard Way" - orchestra and chorus girls*
5. "Great Big Town" - Joey Evans and chorus girls
6. "There's a Small Hotel" (introduced in the 1936 musical On Your Toes) - Joey Evans
7. "Zip" - Vera Simpson*
8. "I Could Write a Book" - Joey Evans and Linda English*
9. "The Lady Is a Tramp" (introduced in the 1937 musical Babes in Arms) - Joey Evans
10. "Bewitched, Bothered and Bewildered" - Vera Simpson*
11. "Plant You Now, Dig You Later" - orchestra*
12. "My Funny Valentine" (introduced in the 1937 musical Babes in Arms) - Linda English
13. "You Mustn't Kick It Around" - orchestra*
14. Strip Number - "I Could Write a Book" -Linda English
15. Dream Sequence and Finale: "What Do I Care for a Dame"/"Bewitched, Bothered and Bewildered"/"I Could Write a Book" - Joey Evans
- From the 1940 Broadway musical as per Wikipedia's page for Broadway musical.

== Soundtrack ==
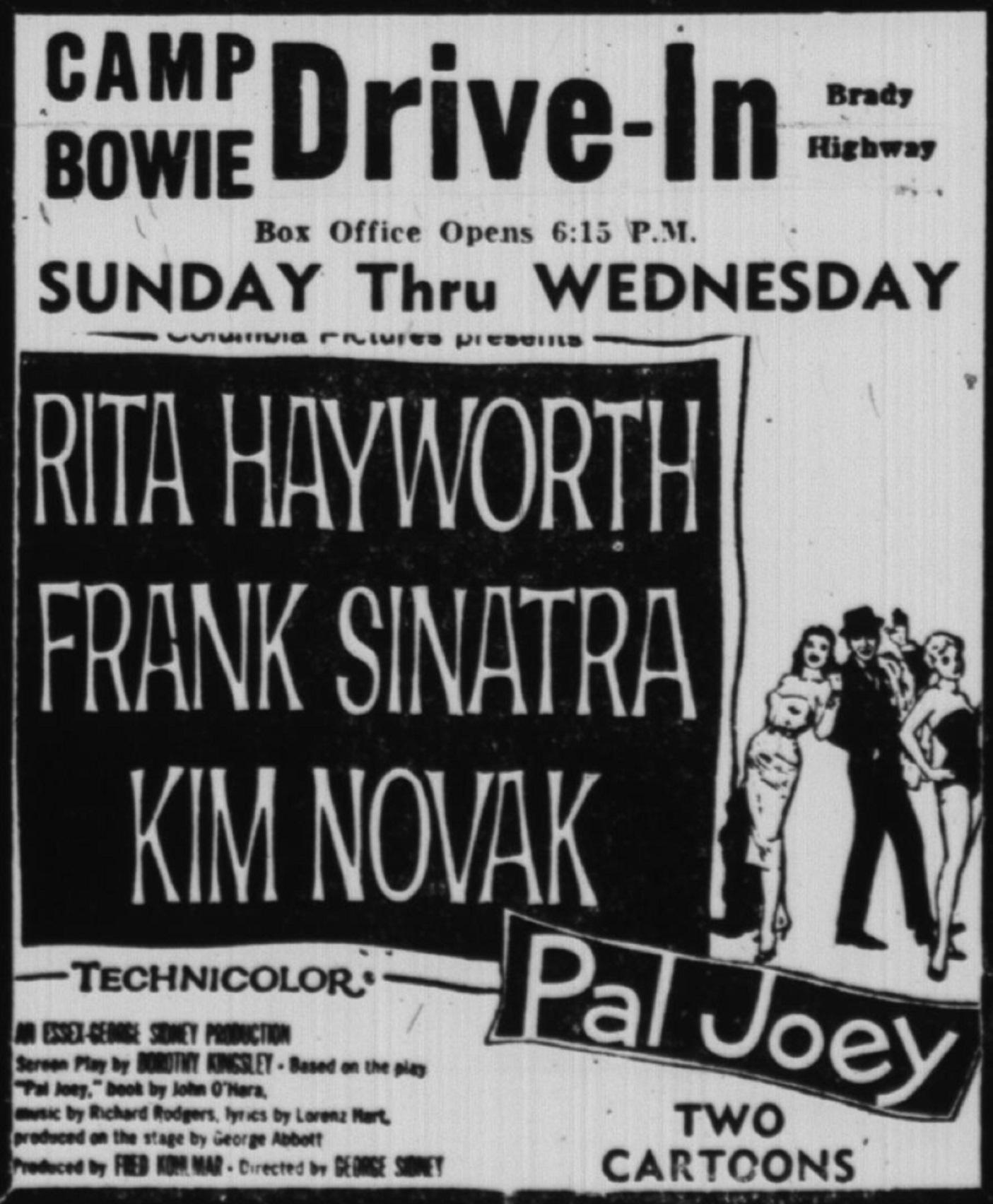
Brownwood Bulletin 1958 advertisement for Camp Bowie Drive-in showing

Some of the recordings on the soundtrack album featuring Sinatra only are not the same songs that appeared in the film. "The Lady Is a Tramp" is a mono-only outtake from Sinatra's 1957 album A Swingin' Affair!, while three others ("There's a Small Hotel", "Bewitched", and "I Could Write a Book") were recorded in mono only at Capitol Studios. "I Didn't Know What Time It Was" appeared in an odd hybrid: The first half of the song was recorded at Columbia Pictures but differs from the version used in the film, while the second half is the same as used in the film, also recorded at Columbia. "What Do I Care for a Dame" is the film version, as recorded at Columbia. The Sinatra songs as they appear in the film as well as those performed by Rita Hayworth and Kim Novak (both were dubbed), Jo Ann Greer (Hayworth) and Trudi Erwin (Novak) were recorded at Columbia Pictures studios in true stereo.

=== Charts ===
| Chart | Peak position |
|---|---|
| UK Albums (Official Charts) | 1 |
| US Albums | 2 |

== Critical reception and box office ==
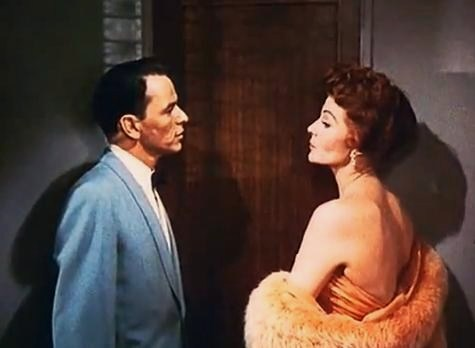
Sinatra and Hayworth in the trailer

Opening to positive reviews on October 25, 1957, Pal Joey was an instant success with critics and the general public alike. Variety stated, "Pal Joey is a strong, funny entertainment. Dorothy Kingsley's screenplay, from John O'Hara's book, is skillful rewriting, with colorful characters and solid story built around the Richard Rodgers and Lorenz Hart songs. A total of 14 tunes are intertwined with the plot, 10 of them being reprised from the original. Others by the same team of cleffers are 'I Didn't Know What Time It Was', 'The Lady Is a Tramp', 'There's a Small Hotel' and 'Funny Valentine'."

The New York Times' A. H. Weiler stated, "This is largely Mr. Sinatra's show...he projects a distinctly bouncy likeable personality into an unusual role. And his rendition of the top tunes, notably "The Lady Is a Tramp" and "Small Hotel," gives added lustre to these indestructible standards."

With theatrical rentals of $4.7 million in the United States and Canada, Pal Joey was ranked by Variety as one of the 10 highest-earning films of 1957. It earned rentals of $7 million worldwide.

On the review aggregator website Rotten Tomatoes, 89% of 55 critics' reviews are positive. The website's consensus reads: "Anchored by a charismatic Frank Sinatra, Pal Joey thrives as a slick, song-driven musical, even as it tones down the bite of its stage origins."

== Awards and nominations ==
| Award | Year | Category | Recipient(s) | Result |
|---|---|---|---|---|
| Academy Awards | 1958 | Best Art Direction | Walter Holscher, William Kiernan and Louis Diage | Nominated |
| Academy Awards | 1958 | Best Costume Design | Jean Louis | Nominated |
| Academy Awards | 1958 | Best Film Editing | Viola Lawrence and Jerome Thoms | Nominated |
| Academy Awards | 1958 | Best Sound Recording | John P. Livadary | Nominated |
| Golden Globe Awards | 1958 | Best Film – Comedy or Musical | | Nominated |
| Golden Globe Awards | 1958 | Best Actor – Comedy or Musical | Frank Sinatra | Won |
| Laurel Awards | 1958 | Top Musical | | Won |
| Laurel Awards | 1958 | Top Male Musical Performance | Frank Sinatra | Won |
| Laurel Awards | 1958 | Top Music Director | Morris Stoloff | Nominated |
| Writers Guild of America Awards | 1958 | Best Written American Musical | Dorothy Kingsley | Nominated |

Other honors

The film is recognized by American Film Institute in these lists:

- 2004: AFI's 100 Years...100 Songs:
  - "My Funny Valentine" – Nominated
- 2006: AFI's Greatest Movie Musicals – Nominated
