= Gigi (play) =

1951 play by Anita Loos

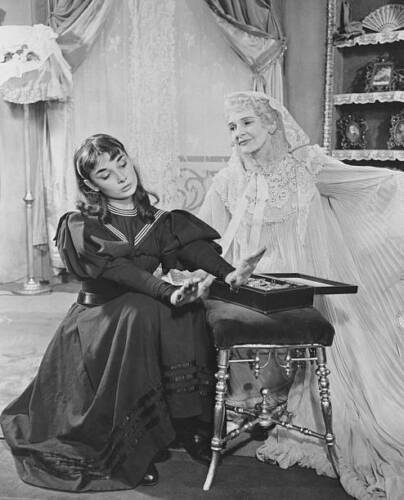
Audrey Hepburn and Cathleen Nesbitt in the original Broadway production of Gigi (1951)

Gigi is a 1951 play written by Anita Loos. It is based on Colette's 1944 novel of the same name, and was produced on Broadway, where it starred Audrey Hepburn in the title role.

== Plot ==
The play's plot generally follows that of the original story, focusing on a young 19th century Parisian girl being groomed for a career as a courtesan. Gigi lives with her mother and grandmother, and takes lessons at the home of her aunt. Her lessons include social manners, conversation, and personal relationships. The family has significant social connections, and have been great friends with the rich playboy Gaston. Gaston is bored with his life, and his only joy seems to be in the company of Gigi and her family.

Aunt Alicia decides that the time is right for Gigi's entry into society. After dressing her up, she is presented to Gaston as a young woman. He is, at first, dismayed at the change. Gradually he realizes that he is attracted to Gigi, and takes her out on the town. As the night progresses, Gaston sees the emptiness of his life and wants something more. He proposes marriage to Gigi, and she gladly accepts.

== Opening night production credits ==
- (Fulton) Theatre Owned / Operated by City Playhouses, Inc.(Louis A. Lotito, President)
- Produced by Gilbert Miller
- Written by Anita Loos; Adapted from the novel by Colette; Music selected by Alexander Haas
- Directed by Raymond Rouleau
- Scenic Design by Raymond Sovey
- General manager: Morton Gottlieb
- Company Manager: D'Arcy Miller
- Stage Manager: Richard Bender
- Assistant Stage Mgr: Ronald Telfer
- Technical Consultant to Mr. Rouleau: Lila de Nobili
- Press Representative: Richard Maney and Frank Goodman
- Special Promotion: Arthur Cantor

== Opening night cast ==
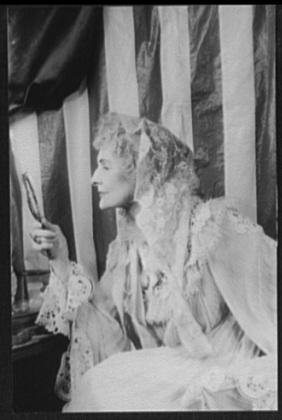
Cathleen Nesbitt as Aunt Alicia in Gigi

- Audrey Hepburn ... Gigi
- Cathleen Nesbitt ... Alicia de St. Ephlam, Gigi's Aunt
- Doris Patston ... Andree, Gigi's Mother
- Josephine Brown ... Madame Alvarez, Gigi's Grandmother
- Bertha Belmore ... Sidonie
- Michael Evans ... Gaston Lachaille
- Francis Compton ... Victor

== See also ==
- Gigi (1949 film)
- Gigi (1958 film)
- Gigi (musical)
