= Jeanne Eagels =

American actress (1890-1929)

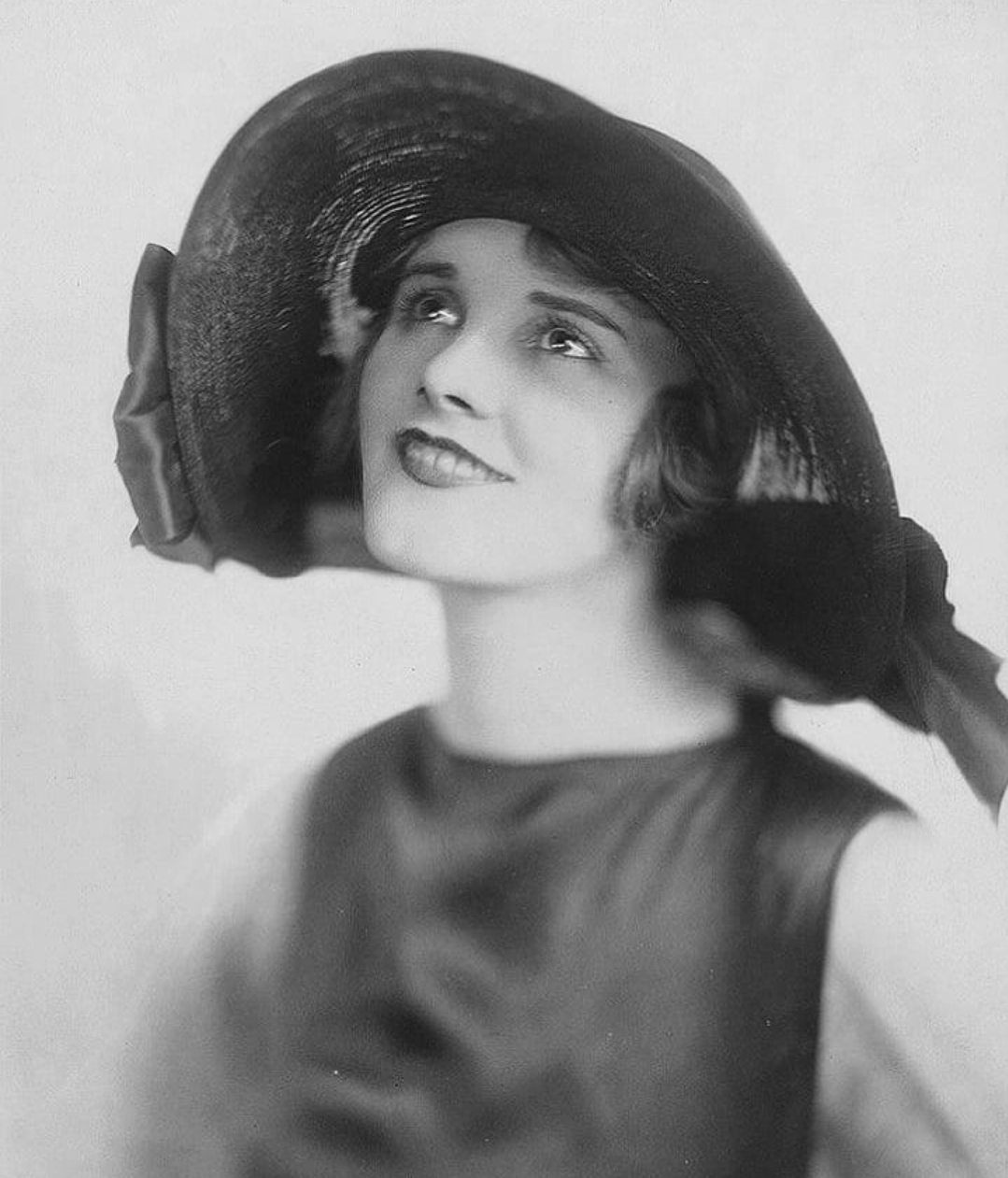
- Eagels in 1923
- Born: Eugenia Eagles; June 26, 1890; Kansas City, Missouri, U.S.
- Died: October 3, 1929 (aged 39); New York City, U.S.
- Resting place: Calvary Cemetery
- Occupation: Actress
- Years active: 1913–1929
- Spouses: Maurice Dubinsky (m. 1909?; div. 1911?); Edward Harris "Ted" Coy (m. 1925; div. 1928)

Jeanne Eagels (born Eugenia Eagles; June 26, 1890 – October 3, 1929) was an American stage and film actress. Eagels appeared in many Broadway productions, and in the emerging medium of sound films. She was posthumously nominated for the Academy Award for Best Actress for her 1929 role in The Letter after dying suddenly that year at the age of 39.

== Early life ==
Eugenia Eagles was the second of six children born to Edward and Julia Eagles. Her father was of German and French Huguenot descent, and her mother (née Sullivan) was of Irish descent. Her birth year – depending on the source – is given as 1888, 1890 (official bio year), 1891, 1892, 1893 (death certificate), or 1894. Jeanne, who later changed the spelling of her surname to "Eagels", would later claim that her father was a Spanish architect and she was born in Boston. In reality, she was born in Kansas City, Missouri, and her father was a carpenter. Actress Mary Shipp was Eagels's niece.

Eagels attended St. Joseph's Catholic School and Morris Public School. She quit school shortly after her First Communion to work as a cash girl in a department store.

== Career ==
Eagels began her acting career at a young age in Kansas City, appearing in a variety of small venues. She left Kansas City around the age of 15 and toured the midwestern U.S. with the Dubinsky Brothers' traveling theater show as a dancer. She later played the leading lady in several comedies and dramas put on by the Dubinskys, who later founded AMC Theatres. As a teenager, she married Maurice Dubinsky, who frequently played a villain.

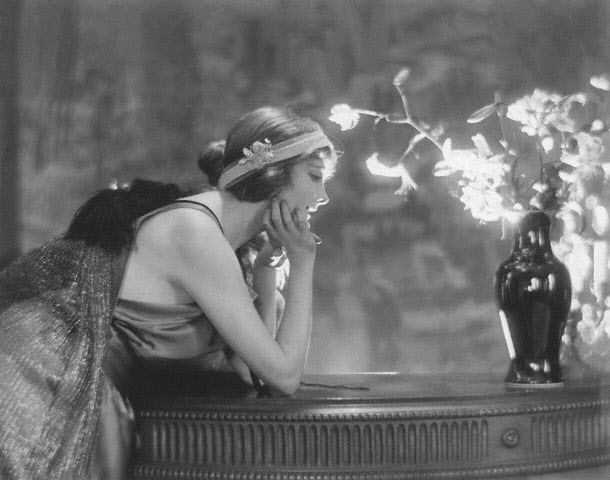
Eagels photographed by Adolph de Meyer in 1921 wearing a dress and cape by Paris couturier Louise Chéruit

Around 1911, she moved to New York City and worked in chorus lines. Her hair was brown, but she bleached it when she went to New York. During this period, one of her acting coaches was Beverley Sitgreaves. She was in the supporting cast of Mind the Paint Girl at the Lyceum Theatre in September 1912. Eagels played opposite George Arliss in three plays in 1916 and 1917.

In 1915, she appeared in her first motion picture. She also made three films for Thanhouser Film Corporation in 1916–17. In 1918, she appeared in Daddies, a David Belasco production. She quit this show due to illness and subsequently traveled to Europe. She appeared in several other Broadway shows between 1919 and 1921.

In 1922, she had her first starring role, in the play Rain by John Colton and Clemence Randolph, based on a short story by Somerset Maugham. In this, her favorite role, Eagels played Sadie Thompson, a free-wheeling and promiscuous spirit who confronts a fire-and-brimstone preacher on a South Pacific island. She went on tour with Rain for two more seasons and returned to Broadway to give a farewell performance in 1926.

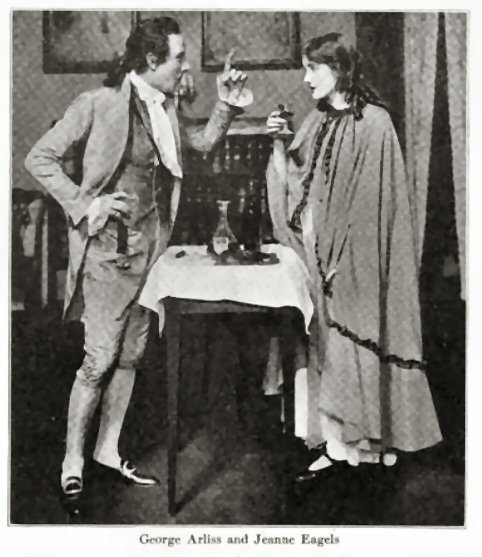
Eagels with George Arliss in the Broadway play Hamilton, 1917

In 1926, Eagels was offered the part of Roxie Hart in Maurine Dallas Watkins's play Chicago, but she walked out during rehearsals. She next appeared in the comedy Her Cardboard Lover (1927) with Leslie Howard, touring for several months. After missing a few performances due to ptomaine poisoning, Eagels returned to the cast in July 1927 for an Empire Theater show.

After a season on Broadway, she took a break to make a movie. She appeared opposite John Gilbert in the MGM film Man, Woman and Sin (1927), directed by Monta Bell. In 1928, after failing to appear for a performance of Her Cardboard Lover in Milwaukee, Wisconsin, Eagels was banned from the stage for 18 months by Actors Equity. The ban did not stop Eagels from working in film, and she made two sound films for Paramount Pictures, The Letter and Jealousy, both released in 1929.

== Personal life ==
Eagels was married twice. Her first marriage was to actor Maurice Dubinsky whom she married when she was a teenager. The couple reportedly had a son who either died (causing Eagels to have a nervous breakdown) or who was placed for adoption after the couple separated. Eagels and Dubinsky eventually divorced. In August 1925, Eagels married Edward Harris "Ted" Coy, a former football star at Yale University who became a stockbroker. They had no children and divorced in July 1928.

== Death and legacy ==
During the peak of her success, Eagels began abusing drugs and alcohol and eventually developed an addiction. She went to several sanatoriums in an effort to kick her dependency. By the mid-1920s, she had begun using heroin. When she entered her 30s, Eagels began suffering from bouts of ill health that were exacerbated by her excessive substance abuse.

In September 1929, Eagels underwent eye surgery at St. Luke's Hospital in New York City. At the time, she was also suffering from breathing problems and neuritis. After a ten-day stay, Eagels returned to her apartment on Park Avenue. On October 3, 1929, Eagels and her secretary walked to the Park Avenue Hospital where Eagels had an appointment. While talking to the doctor, she began having convulsions and died shortly thereafter. The assistant chief medical examiner who performed Eagels' autopsy concluded that she died of "alcoholic psychosis". The medical examiner stated that while Eagels had not consumed alcohol in the two days preceding her death, she had been "acting strangely" and suffering from hallucinations three or four days before she died. Toxicology reports revealed that Eagels still had alcohol in her organs when she died in addition to heroin and chloral hydrate (a sedative that Eagels regularly took to sleep). Her death was attributed to an overdose of the chloral hydrate.

After services in New York at the Frank E. Campbell Funeral Chapel, Eagels received a second funeral service when her body was returned to Kansas City on October 7, where she was buried in Calvary Cemetery. She was survived by her mother Julia Eagles and several brothers and sisters.

Eagles was nominated posthumously for Best Actress for her role in The Letter at the 2nd Academy Awards in 1930. She was the first performer to be nominated by the Academy after her death, though hers, like all the nominations at the 2nd Academy Awards, was unofficial, being among several actresses "under consideration" by a board of judges.

In 1957, a mostly fictionalized film biography entitled Jeanne Eagels was made by Columbia Pictures, with Eagels portrayed by Kim Novak. Eagels' family sued Columbia over the way Eagels had been depicted in the movie. Jeanne Eagels: A Life Revealed by Eric Woodard and Tara Banks (Bearmanor Media) appeared in 2015.

== Filmography ==
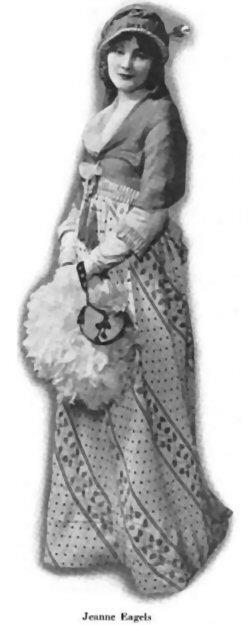
Eagels featured in The Bellman, Volume 23, July 7, 1917

| Year | Title | Role | Notes |
|---|---|---|---|
| 1913 | The Ace of Hearts | | |
| 1913 | The Bride of the Sea | | |
| 1914 | A Lesson in Bridge | Mrs. Willis | |
| 1915 | The House of Fear | Grace Cramp | Lost film |
| 1916 | The World and the Woman | A Woman of the Streets | Extant |
| 1917 | The Fires of Youth | Billy's Sister | Credited as Jeanne Eagles; Extant |
| 1917 | Under False Colors | Countess Olga | Lost film |
| 1918 | The Cross Bearer | Liane de Merode | |
| 1919 | The Madonna of the Slums | | |
| 1927 | Man, Woman and Sin | Vera Worth | Extant |
| 1929 | The Letter | Leslie Crosbie | Nominated - Academy Award for Best Actress Extant |
| 1929 | Jealousy | Yvonne | Lost film |

== Awards and nominations ==
| Year | Award | Category | Nominated work | Result | Ref |
|---|---|---|---|---|---|
| 1930 | Academy Awards | Best Actress | The Letter | Nominated (posthumous) | |

== See also ==
- List of actors with Academy Award nominations
