= Sadie Thompson (musical) =

Sadie Thompson is a 1944 musical in two acts and three scenes by composer Vernon Duke and lyricist Howard Dietz. The musical book, written by Dietz and Rouben Mamoulian, is based on the short story "Rain" by W. Somerset Maugham, published in the literary magazine The Smart Set in 1921. Originally written as a vehicle for Ethel Merman, the actress withdrew from production on September 29, 1944 after just a week and a half of rehearsals, and the lead part went to June Havoc. The work premiered at the Sam S. Shubert Theatre in Philadelphia on October 26, 1944 where it ran for two weeks of tryout performances, then moved to New York. The original production was produced by A.P. Waxman, directed by Mamoulian, and choreographed by Edward Caton. Boris Aronson designed the sets, and the Motley Theatre Design Group designed the costumes.

Sadie Thompson debuted on Broadway at the Alvin Theatre on November 16, 1944, with a cast led by June Havoc as Sadie Thompson, Lansing Hatfield as Reverend Alfred Davidson, James Newill as Sergeant Tim O'Hara, Ralph Dumke as Joe Horn, Grazia Narciso as Ameena, Zolya Talma as Mrs. Alfred Davidson, Walter Burke as Quartermaster Bates, Daniel Cobb as Corporal Hodgson, Norman Lawrence as Private Griggs, and Doris Patston as Cicely St. Clair. The production closed after 60 performances on January 6, 1945.
