= Rain (short story) =

Short story by William Somerset Maugham

- Short story by W. Somerset Maugham
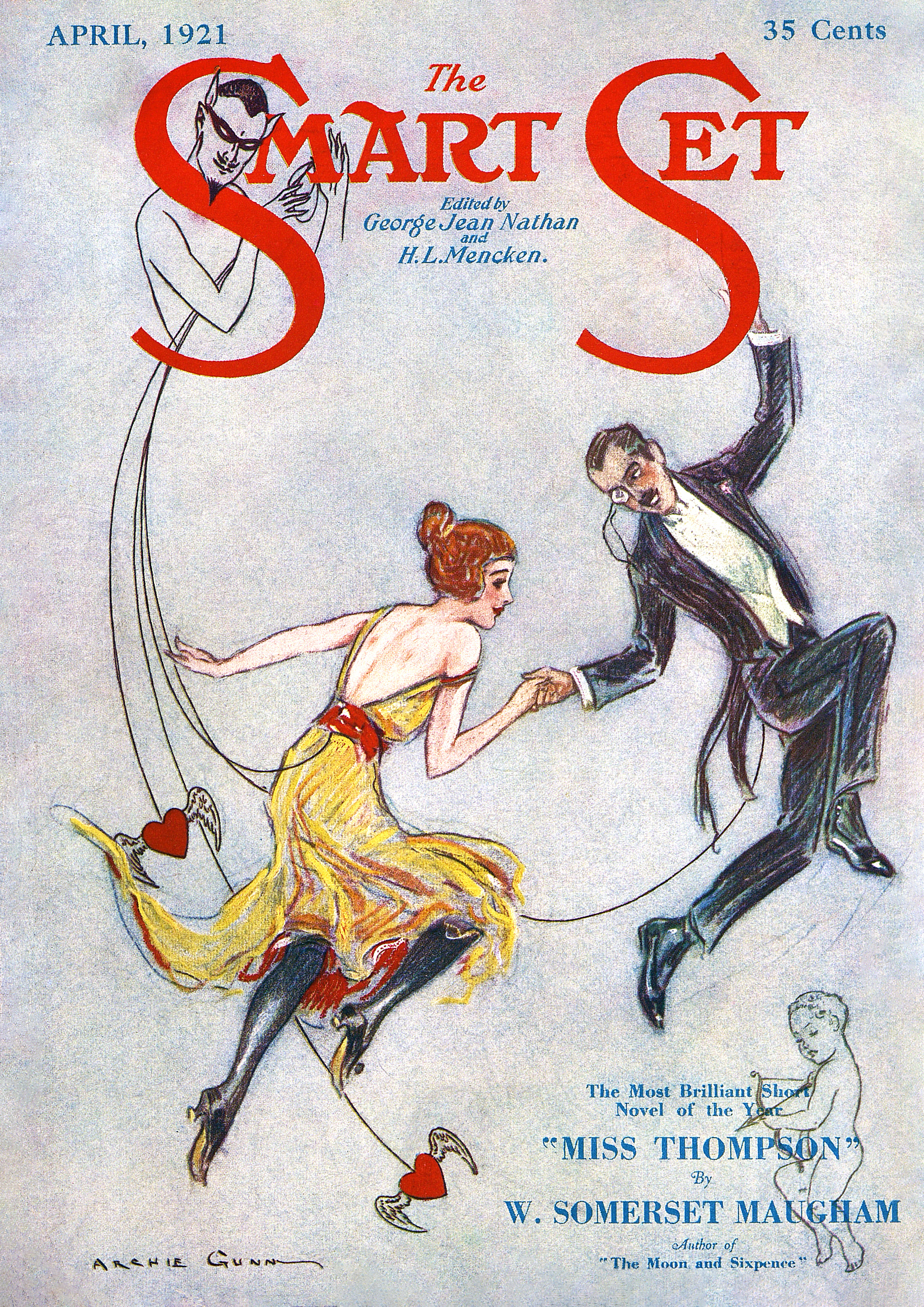
- Cover of The Smart Set for April 1921, announcing "Miss Thompson" as "The Most Brilliant Short Novel of the Year"
- Original title: Miss Thompson
- Language: English

Publication
- Published in: The Smart Set
- Publication type: Periodical
- Publication date: April 1921
- Publication place: United Kingdom

"Rain" is a short story by the British writer W. Somerset Maugham. It was originally published as "Miss Thompson" in the April 1921 issue of the American literary magazine The Smart Set, and was included in the collection of stories by Maugham The Trembling of a Leaf.

The story is set on a Pacific island: a missionary's determination to reform a prostitute leads to tragedy.

== Background ==
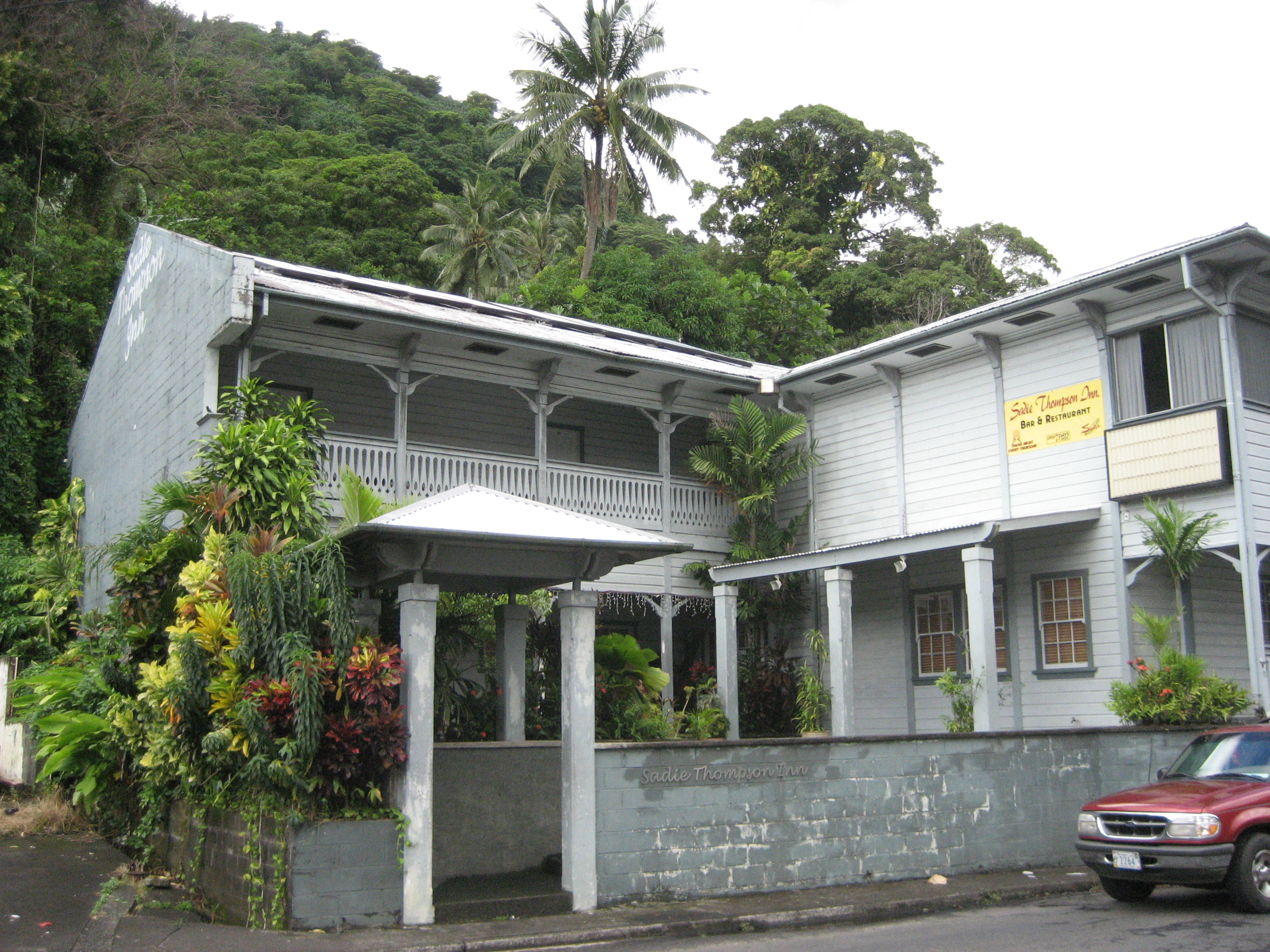
The guest house where from mid-December 1916 author W. Somerset Maugham resided for six weeks during an extended trip through the South Sea Islands, later called the Sadie Thompson Inn.

In December 1916 during a tour of the Pacific, Maugham and his secretary/companion Gerald Haxton, on the steamer Sonoma, visited Pago Pago, the capital of American Samoa. Delayed by a quarantine inspection, Maugham, Haxton and others took lodgings there. Other passengers on the Sonoma included a "Miss Thompson", and a medical missionary and his wife, who were models for the characters in "Rain".

Near Pago Pago is Rainmaker Mountain, which gives Pago Pago Harbor an unusually high rainfall. He named it “Rain” as it was raining continuously during his visit to Pago Pago.

== Summary ==
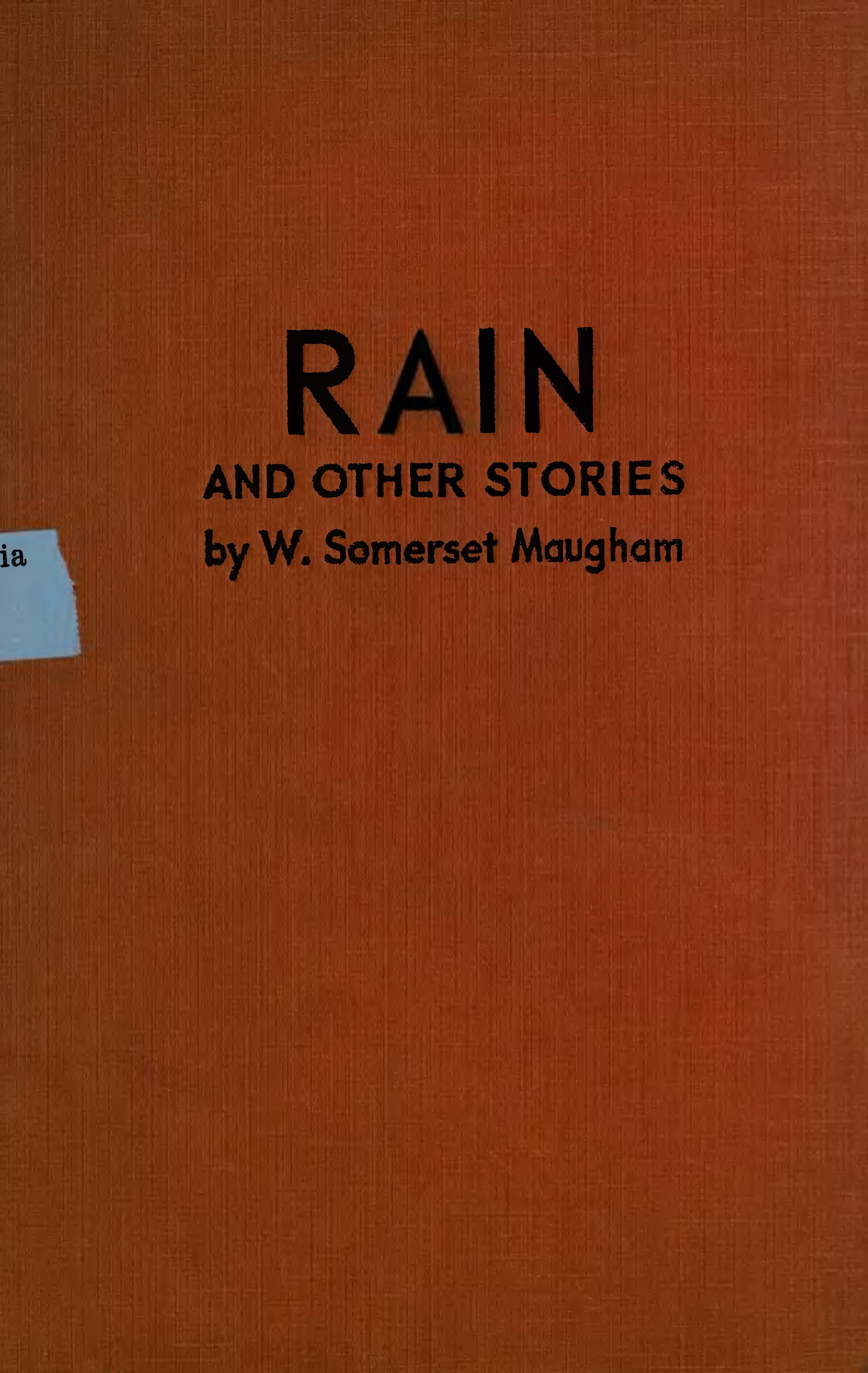
Cover of the collection Rain and other stories, New York, Grosset & Dunlap, 1921

On the way to Apia in the Pacific, a ship stops at Pago Pago. The passengers include Dr. Macphail and his wife, and Davidson (a missionary) and his wife (the story is told from Macphail's point of view). Because of an epidemic of measles (a serious disease for local people) on the island, the ship cannot leave until it is sure none of the crew is infected. The Macphails and the Davidsons find lodgings with Horn, a trader on the front. For most of their stay there is heavy rain which they find oppressive. Macphail hears from Davidson and his wife about the severity of the missionary in his work.

Also staying there from the ship is Miss Thompson. From her room is heard the sound of a gramophone and men's voices. They remember she came on board at Honolulu and is presumably from Iwelei, the red-light district there. Davidson is determined to stop her activities, and tries to get Horn to stop her having visitors. Macphail feels that Davidson is

mysteriously at work. He had an impression that he was weaving a net around the woman, carefully, systematically, and suddenly, when everything was ready would pull the strings tight.

Davidson sees the governor of the island and gets him to put Miss Thompson on the next ship, which goes to San Francisco. The governor, aware that the missionaries have influence, does not change his decision when Macphail visits him. Miss Thompson is distraught, as she will be sent to the penitentiary if she returns to San Francisco. Davidson is often with Miss Thompson, whom he now familiarly calls Sadie. Her personality changes and she becomes repentant, it appears. Davidson says to the Macphails, "It's a true rebirth. Her soul, which was black as night, is now pure and white.... All day I pray with her...."

A few days later Davidson's body is found on the beach; he has cut his throat with a razor. Macphail does not understand what happened until, returning to his lodgings, he finds Sadie Thompson has changed suddenly back to "the flaunting quean they had known at first". She breaks into "a loud, jeering laugh" at Mrs. Davidson and the Macphails, and says to Macphail, "You men! You filthy, dirty pigs! You're all the same, all of you."

== Adaptations ==
The story has been the basis of a number of adaptations.

- Rain (1922), a play by John Colton and Clemence Randolph. It ran for 608 performances, from 7 November 1922 to 31 May 1924, in New York at the Maxine Elliott Theatre, starring Jeanne Eagels.
- Sadie Thompson (1928), a silent film starring Gloria Swanson.
- Rain (1932), a film starring Joan Crawford.
- Sadie Thompson (1944), a two act three scene musical play starring June Havoc on Broadway.
- Miss Sadie Thompson (1953), a film starring Rita Hayworth.
- Sadie (1980), a pornographic film directed by Bob Chinn.
- Rain (1997), an opera by Richard Owen.
- Rain (2016), a musical by Michael John LaChiusa

== Cited sources ==
- "Rain" (PDF) – via Lone Star College. The short story by W. Somerset Maugham.
