= Affair in Trinidad =

1952 film by Vincent Sherman

- Theatrical release poster
- Directed by: Vincent Sherman
- Screenplay by: Berne Giler; James Gunn
- Story by: Virginia Van Upp; Berne Giler
- Produced by: Vincent Sherman; Rita Hayworth
- Starring: Rita Hayworth; Glenn Ford; Alexander Scourby
- Cinematography: Joseph Walker
- Edited by: Viola Lawrence
- Color process: Black and white
- Production company: The Beckworth Corporation
- Distributed by: Columbia Pictures
- Release dates: July 30, 1952 (New York); August 6, 1952 (Los Angeles)
- Running time: 98 minutes
- Country: United States
- Language: English
- Budget: $1.2 million
- Box office: $7 million (domestic receipts)

Affair in Trinidad is a 1952 American film noir directed by Vincent Sherman and starring Rita Hayworth and Glenn Ford. It was produced by Hayworth's Beckworth Corporation and released by Columbia Pictures.

The film is notable as Hayworth's comeback vehicle after four years away from Columbia, as a reteaming of the stars of Gilda (1946) and for a fiery opening number in which Hayworth dances barefoot to calypso music. Hayworth's singing voice is dubbed by Jo Ann Greer, who later also sang for her in Miss Sadie Thompson and Pal Joey. The film's gross take at the box office exceeded Gilda's by $1 million.

== Plot ==
Chris Emery works as a nightclub singer and dancer in the British colony of Trinidad and Tobago. One night after her performance, she receives news from Inspector Smythe and Anderson, a member of the American consulate, that her husband Neil has been found dead. She is comforted by Neil's friend Max Fabian.

Initially, the police conclude that Neil committed suicide based on his gunshot wound and the discovery of a pistol at the crime scene, but on further investigation, they believe that he was murdered. Smythe and Anderson take Chris into their confidence and inform her that Neil's boat was seen outside Fabian's property at the time of Neil's murder. Chris learns that Fabian is a crook who has built his fortune by trading information and aiding in treason, so Neil could have been murdered because of his involvement in Fabian's latest project to allow Nazis to launch rockets from Trinidad to attack the United States. Chris agrees to exploit Fabian's love for her in order to gather information for the police.

Neil's brother Steve Emery arrives in Trinidad at the request of his late brother, who had written to him about a prospective job. Steve is shocked to learn that Neil committed suicide shortly after writing to him and investigates matters on his own. After the inquest, Chris and Steve spend time together and she begins to fall in love with him, but she cannot reveal her motive behind her relationship with Fabian.

At a party at Fabian's estate, Steve recognizes Walters as a man who had sat next to him on his flight to Trinidad and had become agitated at the mention of his brother's name. Since Walters' portion of research has been completed, Fabian judges him a liability and has him killed by a hit-and-run driver, increasing the authorities' suspicion.

As Chris inches closer to discovering the truth about Fabian, Steve gathers proof of Fabian's involvement in Neil's death, leading to a climactic showdown. During the struggle for a gun, Fabian is accidentally shot in the stomach. Sensing that his wound might prove fatal, he orders his accomplices to take the secrets and leave him behind. However, local authorities have surrounded the estate and they are either killed or captured. Steve kills Fabian in a climactic gunfight, and with Chris cleared, they leave for Chicago.

== Cast ==
- Rita Hayworth as Chris Emery
  - Jo Ann Greer as singing voice of Chris Emery
- Glenn Ford as Steve Emery
- Alexander Scourby as Max Fabian
- Valerie Bettis as Veronica Huebling
- Torin Thatcher as Inspector Smythe
- Howard Wendell as Anderson
- Karel Stepanek as Walters
- George Voskovec as Doctor Franz Huebling
- Steven Geray as Wittol
- Walter Kohler as Peter Bronec
- Juanita Moore as Dominique
- Mort Mills as Martin, Wittol's Henchman
- Ralph Moody as Coroner

== Production ==
Just before production was to begin, Rita Hayworth informed Columbia Pictures that she would not report for work for the first day of filming on December 17, 1951, claiming that she had not been afforded the opportunity to read the entire script. Columbia placed the project on hold and suspended Hayworth, stating to the press that despite the fact that Hayworth did not have rights to story approval, Vincent Sherman had informed her about all script developments, casting and preproduction activities and that she had never previously expressed any objections. The studio had already spent $500,000 on the project at the time of the suspension. Hayworth returned to work for rehearsals on January 10, 1952 and production began on January 25.

== Reception ==
In a contemporary review for The New York Times, critic Bosley Crowther wrote:

In the first place, this tepid fiction ... becomes as apparent and monotonous as a phonograph record on which the needle is stuck before it has traveled half the distance of the hour and forty minutes that it runs. ... But, more than the story's being tedious and lackadaisically played by a cast which Vincent Sherman has directed as though he were lolling in bed, the demurely returning Miss Hayworth proves no bargain after an absence of four years. In that time, we had probably forgotten what a mediocre actress she is, and now the bald fact—politely winked at in the past—hits one right between the eyes. Tawny she is and sometimes handsome in a highly shellacked and tailored way, but her acting is vastly unexpressive of anything but the postures of a doll. And the dancing she does in this picture makes her look both vulgar and grotesque.

Critic Edwin Schallert of the Los Angeles Times wrote: "[W]hile it offers much that is tried and true as a melodrama, the feature reintroducing the exotic Latinesque luminary proffers an assortment of zestful situations and action. ... Though the picture may not keep the audiences guessing too long, despite its maintenance of a mystery air, whether you call the shots or not, you won't find 'Affairs in Trinidad' [sic] lacking in the kind of appeal usually associated with a Hayworth production."

The film earned an estimated $2.7 million at the North American box office in 1952.

The film was nominated for Best Costume Design, Black and White at the 25th Academy Awards.

== Music ==
- "I've Been Kissed Before" - written by Lester Lee and Bob Russell; performed by Rita Hayworth (dubbed by Jo Ann Greer).
- "Trinidad Lady" - written by Lester Lee and Bob Russell; performed by Rita Hayworth (dubbed by Jo Ann Greer).
