= Sadie Thompson (film) =

1928 film directed by Raoul Walsh

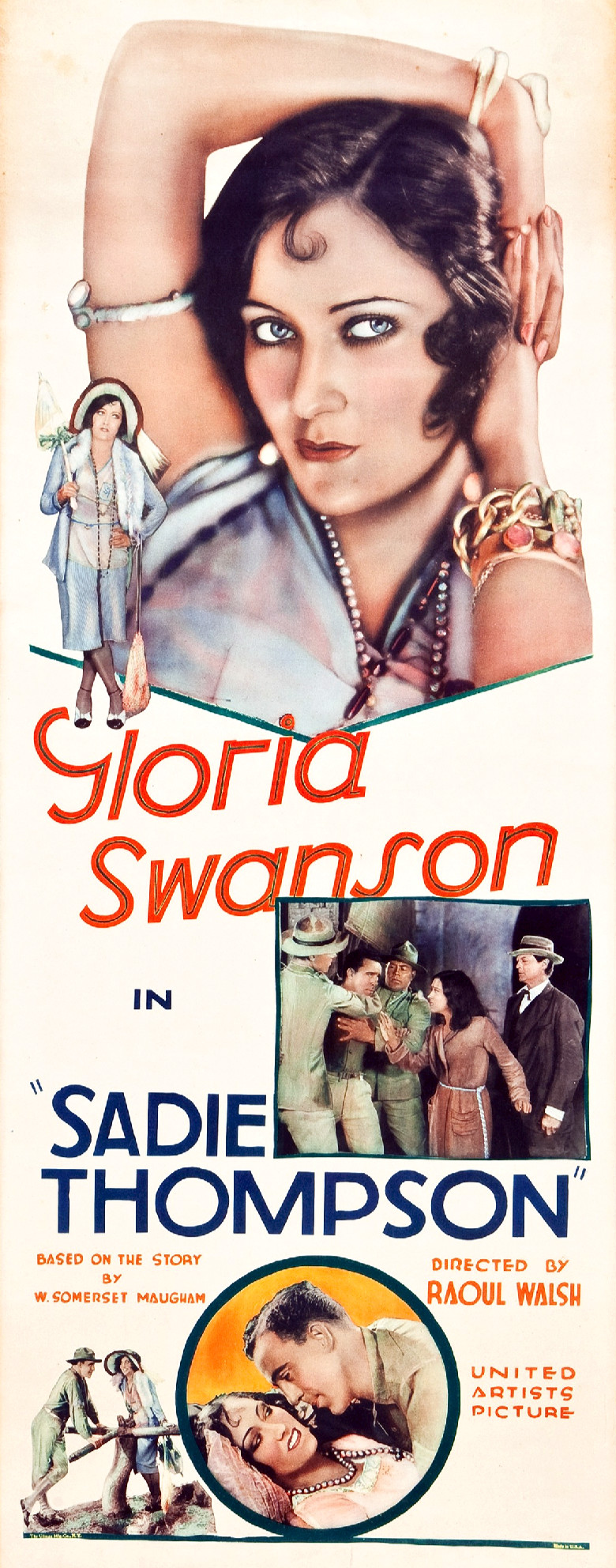
- Film poster
- Directed by: Raoul Walsh
- Written by: Gloria Swanson; Raoul Walsh
- Story by: W. Somerset Maugham
- Based on: Rain by John Colton and Clemence Randolph
- Produced by: Gloria Swanson Productions
- Starring: Gloria Swanson; Lionel Barrymore; Raoul Walsh; Blanche Friderici
- Cinematography: George Barnes; Robert Kurrle; Oliver T. Marsh
- Edited by: C. Gardner Sullivan
- Distributed by: United Artists
- Release date: January 7, 1928 (general release)
- Running time: 91 minutes
- Country: United States
- Languages: Silent; English intertitles
- Budget: US$650,000
- Box office: $8 million

Sadie Thompson is a 1928 American silent drama film that tells the story of a "fallen woman" who comes to Pago Pago to start a new life, but encounters a zealous missionary who wants to force her back to her former life in San Francisco. The film stars Gloria Swanson, Lionel Barrymore, and Raoul Walsh, and it is one of Swanson's more successful films. Due to the public's apathy towards silent films, a sound version was prepared in the latter half of 1928. While the sound version has no audible dialog, it features a synchronized musical score with sound effects along with a theme song.

Due to the subject matter, the making of the film was extremely controversial. However, it was a financial and critical success for Swanson. The film was based on the 1921 short story "Rain" by W. Somerset Maugham and the 1922 play, based on the story, by John Colton and Clemence Randolph, starring Jeanne Eagels.

== Plot ==
A smoking, drinking, jazz listening, young prostitute named Sadie Thompson arrives at Pago Pago, on her way to a job with a shipping line on another island. At the same time, 'moralists' arrive, including Mr. and Mrs. Davidson. They all end up staying in the same hotel, where the Davidsons plot to teach the natives about sin and Sadie entertains a bunch of Marines.

Sadie begins to fall in love with Sergeant Timothy O'Hara, who is not fazed by her past. He tells her that he has a best friend who married a former prostitute, and the couple now lives happily in Australia.

Davidson sets about trying to redeem Sadie, much to her disgust. He tricks her into telling him about her past in San Francisco, and once she refuses to repent, he declares that he will go to the governor and have her deported. Sadie is terrified of the threat, but O'Hara assures her that it will not happen. He tells her he wishes she would go to Australia and wait for his term of service to finish, after which they can get married. She agrees.

Davidson gets his way, however, and Sadie is livid. She and O'Hara go to the governor, begging him to let her go to Australia instead of back to San Francisco. Davidson has managed to get O'Hara punished for being immoral, but Sadie will be able to go to Australia if Davidson approves. Sadie pleads with him, but to no avail. She eventually confesses that, if she goes back to San Francisco, there is "a man there who won't let her go straight", which is what she wants to do. Davidson figures out this statement means that there is a warrant for her arrest back in San Francisco. Sadie claims that she was framed and she is innocent, but will go to prison if she is sent back.

Davidson still refuses, saying she must atone for her past. Sadie pleads and pleads and eventually offers to repent. Davidson, however, says that the only way to fully repent is for her to go to prison. Sadie runs to her room, crying out for Davidson. Davidson returns, and Sadie confesses she is afraid. Davidson then tells her that, if she repents, there will be nothing to fear and he begins to pray with her. Sadie converts to Christianity.

Sadie prays for three whole days. She has put away her old things and has become a modest woman. O'Hara returns and finds Davidson is gone, apparently "trying to stop the locals from dancing on the beach". O'Hara tells Sadie that he has a fishing boat waiting to take her and her things to a ship that will then take her to Australia, where they can marry and be free. Sadie is extremely afraid and refuses to go, saying that the "old Sadie is dead" and she must go to San Francisco and prison to repent.

O'Hara does everything he can, including forcibly taking her from the room, but Davidson is waiting outside. O'Hara tries to attack him, but Sadie asks him to stop. O'Hara, extremely upset, leaves and Sadie pleads with Davidson not to get him in trouble, for "it was all her fault".

Later that night, Sadie is asleep, and everyone else is heading to bed. Davidson can not sleep and goes out for a walk in the rain. (It has rained almost continuously.) His wife says he cannot sleep for "the unpleasant dreams he's been having about Miss Thompson". A fellow boarder suspects they are not "all that unpleasant". Outside, Davidson struggles with himself and realizes that he is sexually attracted to Sadie and that he is unable to handle it. He looks into her window and eventually returns to his room.

Sadie, frightened because she heard noises, is waiting in Davidson's room. Davidson is shocked and sends her back to her room.

The last reel of the film is missing, but the story as originally filmed was that the fishermen find Davidson's body. He has committed suicide. Sadie and O'Hara reconcile and head for Australia.

== Cast ==
- Gloria Swanson as Sadie Thompson
- Lionel Barrymore as Mr. Alfred Davidson
- Blanche Friderici as Mrs. Alfred Davidson
- Charles Willis Lane as Dr. Angus McPhail
- Florence Midgley as Mrs. Angus McPhail
- James A. Marcus as Joe Horn
- Sophia Artega as Ameena
- Will Stanton as Quartermaster Bates
- Raoul Walsh as Sergeant Timothy O'Hara

== Music ==
The sound version featured a theme song entitled “Good Time Sadie” by Seymour Simons.

== Production ==
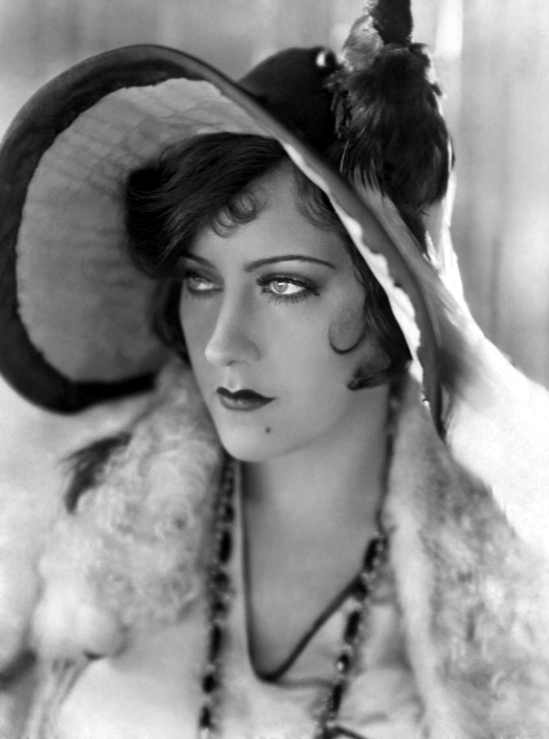
Gloria Swanson as Sadie Thompson

In 1927, Swanson released The Love of Sunya her first independent film for United Artists, which was filmed on her terms in New York City, and it was the opening night film of the Roxy Theatre. The production had been a disaster, and Swanson felt it would receive a mediocre reception at best. On the advice of Joseph Schenck, she relented and returned to Hollywood to prepare for a new picture. Feeling she would never have as much artistic freedom and independence as she had at that moment, Swanson decided she "wanted to make my Gold Rush," referring to a recent film by Charlie Chaplin, which became perhaps his most celebrated work. Schenck pleaded with her to do a commercially successful film like The Last of Mrs. Cheyney. Swanson felt it too formulaic and decided to call upon director Raoul Walsh, who was signed with Fox Film Corporation at the time.

Walsh had been known for bringing controversial material to film. At their first meeting, Swanson suggested a film based on the John Colton and Clemence Randolph play Rain (1923), which in turn was based on the story by W. Somerset Maugham titled "Miss Thompson" (1921). Swanson had seen Jeanne Eagels perform the role on stage twice and enjoyed it.

However, because of its content, the play was on the 'unofficial blacklist' and had quietly been banned from being made into a film a year earlier. To try to avoid issues with the code, Swanson and Walsh decided to leave out profanity, rename 'Reverend Davidson' to 'Mr. Davidson', and claim it was for the sake of morality to produce the picture, as Irving Thalberg had produced The Scarlet Letter (1926) at MGM.

Swanson invited Will Hays for lunch and summarized the plot, naming the author and the sticking points. According to Swanson, Hays made a verbal promise that he would have no problem with the making of such a film. Swanson set about getting the rights to the play by having Schenck pretend to buy it in the name of United Artists, never to be used. Thus they were able to get the story rights for $60,000 instead of the original $100,000. When news broke as to just what was intended with the play, the three authors threatened to sue. Swanson later contacted Maugham requesting that he write an original story that served as a sequel. The sequel would involve following what became of Sadie in Australia. Maugham agreed to write a new story (for $100,000) but a sequel never was made.

Swanson and Walsh set about writing the script, and discreetly placed an ad announcing the film, thinking no one noticed, as Charles Lindbergh had just made his historic flight. However, the press picked up on it and sensationalized the story. United Artists received a threatening two-page telegram from the MPAA, signed by all its members including Fox (Walsh's studio) and Hays himself. In addition, the rest of the signers owned several thousand movie houses and if they refused to screen the film, it could be a financial disaster. It was the first time Swanson had heard the name of Joseph P. Kennedy, with whom she later had an affair and who financed her next few pictures, including Queen Kelly (1929).

Swanson was angered by the response. She felt those very studios had produced "questionable" films themselves and were jealous at not having the chance to produce Rain. After another threatening telegram, she decided to first appeal to MPAA and then the newspapers. She only heard back from Marcus Loew, who promised to appeal on her behalf, and his owning a chain of theatres eased some of her concerns. Figuring the silence meant the matter had been dropped, Swanson began filming on Sadie Thompson, which already had $250,000 invested in it.

Before casting began, 17-year-old Douglas Fairbanks, Jr. wanted to audition for the role of Handsome O'Hara. However, Swanson felt he was too young and not right for the role. Lionel Barrymore, picked first to play Davidson, was thought to be too ill at the time but ended up winning the role. Barrymore wore the same outfit for an entire week, aggravating Swanson. She asked some of the crew to tell him to change and wash, which he did. Swanson was happy with his performance. Walsh had not acted in front of a camera in eight years and feared he would not be able both to direct and to act at the same time. However, two days into filming, his fears were quelled.

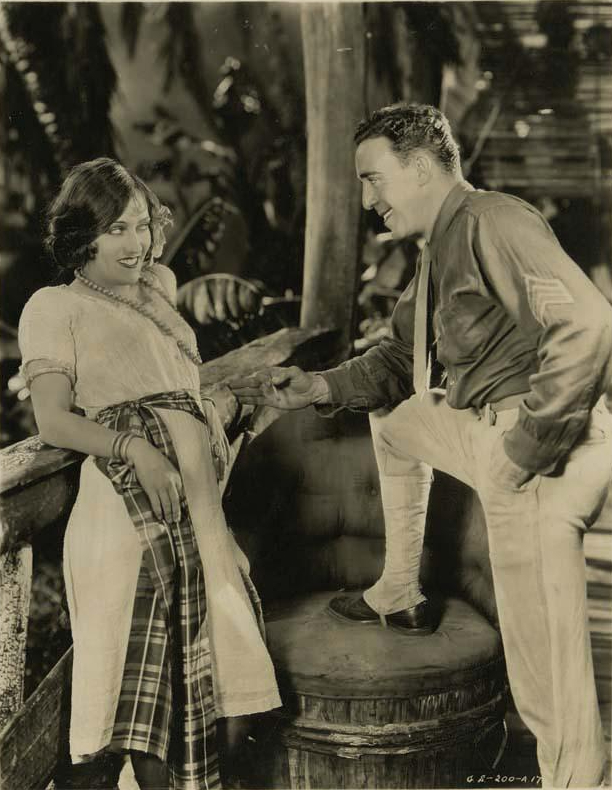
Gloria Swanson and director Raoul Walsh on the set of film Sadie Thompson

Filming took place on Santa Catalina Island, near Long Beach, California. Swanson took ill shortly after and met a doctor who started her lifelong love of macrobiotic diets. A week into shooting, Sam Goldwyn called cameraman George Barnes away. Swanson was furious, but the loan contract allowed Goldwyn to call him away as he pleased. Not wanting to let a hundred extras sit around for days, Swanson and Walsh tried to hire two other cameramen, but both were unsatisfactory. Mary Pickford offered the services of Charles Rosher, her favorite cameraman, but despite doing a decent job, he could not match Barnes' work. Through Loew, MGM loaned Oliver Marsh, who completed the picture.

The entire cameraman problem was extremely costly to the production, yet the picture continued. With the picture half-finished, it was already way over budget, and Schenck was wary, as Swanson's first picture also had been over budget and underperformed. Swanson talked with her advisers and sold her farm at Croton-on-Hudson, and she offered to sell her New York penthouse as well.

Despite reports that dirty words can be read on the characters' lips, Swanson claims the censors went over everything meticulously. However, Swanson admitted one line while she was shouting at Davidson went "You'd rip the wings off of a butterfly, you son of a bitch!, when recounting a conversation with Walsh later in life. If the word "rain" was used in a title card, the censors asked that it be removed. They also wanted to change Davidson's name to something else, but Swanson and Walsh refused.

It was the first time Raoul Walsh had acted in 15 years, and it was his last appearance before the camera. He directed and was to star in his next project In Old Arizona. While on location for that film a jackrabbit jumped through the windshield of his car, and he lost his right eye in the resulting crash. He gave up acting and went on to an illustrious career as a director.

== Release and reception ==
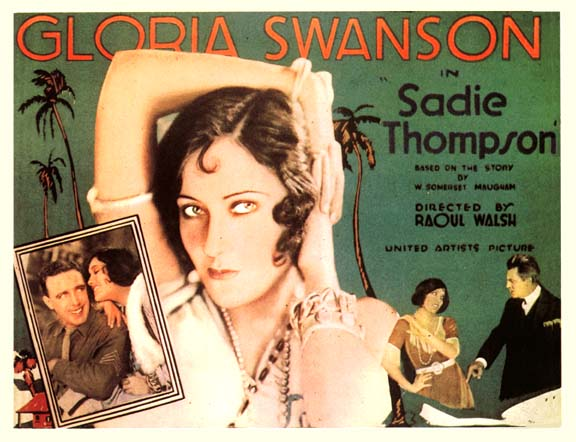
Sadie Thompson lobby card, 1928

Upon its release, critics praised the movie and Swanson's performance. Contemporary film critics have cited Swanson's performance as one of her best.

The film was a financial and critical success, and it was the only silent, independent film of Swanson's to do well at the box office. In fact, it was one of her financially successful films, along with the sound films The Trespasser and Sunset Blvd. It made $1 million in the United States and $7 million internationally. However, at Kennedy's advice, Swanson had sold her distribution rights for the film to Schenck because Kennedy felt it would be a commercial failure. He also did not care for the image Swanson portrayed in the film. By this point, Queen Kelly had been a disaster, and Swanson regretted it.

The film made the top 10 best pictures of the year list as well.

== Censorship ==
When Sadie Thompson was released, many states and cities in the United States had censor boards that could require cuts or other eliminations before the film could be shown. The Kansas censor board ordered cuts of all scenes reflecting upon the reformer's conduct.

== Awards and honors ==
Swanson was nominated for an Academy Award for Best Actress, and George Barnes for Best Cinematography at the 1st Academy Awards for this film, The Devil Dancer and The Magic Flame. Swanson did not attend the ceremony, and always felt it was like "comparing apples to oranges."

The film is recognized by American Film Institute in these lists:

- 2002: AFI's 100 Years...100 Passions – Nominated

== Restoration and home media ==
The film was thought to have been lost for years. After Swanson's death in 1983, the sole known surviving print of the film was discovered by her estate; it had been stored in Mary Pickford's personal archive. By that time, the final reel had become damaged. The film was bought by Kino International, which hired Dennis Doros to reconstruct the final reel. Doros used the original title sequences, still photos and footage from the 1932 adaptation (which cinematographer Oliver T. Marsh also shot) to substitute for the lost footage. A new score by Joseph Turrin was composed for the film.

Kino's version has been issued on DVD and online via Netflix, as well as shown on Turner Classic Movies.

== Other film adaptations ==
- 1932: as Rain, starring Joan Crawford, Walter Huston, Guy Kibbee and Beulah Bondi; adapted by Maxwell Anderson, directed by Lewis Milestone
- 1946: as Dirty Gertie from Harlem U.S.A., starring Francine Everett and Don Wilson, adapted by True T. Thompson, directed by Spencer Williams
- 1949: a film noirish "Sadie Thompson" dance number from the Marx Brothers film Love Happy features Vera-Ellen dancing with a group of World War II Marines led by Paul Valentine
- 1953: as Miss Sadie Thompson, starring Rita Hayworth, José Ferrer, Aldo Ray and Charles Bronson; adapted by Harry Kleiner, directed by Curtis Bernhardt; nominated for the Academy Award for Best Original Song (for Lester Lee and Ned Washington's "Sadie Thompson's Song (Blue Pacific Blues)")

== See also ==
- Sadie Thompson Building, setting of Maugham's story in Pago Pago, listed on the U.S. National Register of Historic Places
- Lionel Barrymore filmography
