= John Colton (screenwriter) =

American playwright and screenwriter (1887–1946)

- Born: December 31, 1887; Minneapolis, Minnesota, U.S.
- Died: December 26, 1946 (aged 58); Gainesville, Texas, U.S.
- Occupations: Playwright; Screenwriter

John Colton (December 31, 1887 – December 26, 1946) was an American playwright and screenwriter born in Minneapolis, Minnesota. He spent the first 14 years of his life in Japan where his English father was a diplomat. After returning to the US he soon worked for a Minneapolis newspaper.

He is notable for adapting, with Clemence Randolph, Somerset Maugham's novella Rain into a 1922 smash hit play starring Jeanne Eagels. He wrote the original play, The Shanghai Gesture, produced on Broadway in 1926. He excelled at writing plays dealing with Americans in far-off lands, an experience Colton knew firsthand from his early youth in Japan. With these huge successes Colton was lured to Hollywood, primarily MGM, where he wrote intertitles for some silent films and scenarios for others. In the talking film era he wrote numerous screenplays. Three of his stage plays found motion picture production: Rain (1932); The Shanghai Gesture (1941); and, posthumously, Under Capricorn (1949).

His 1933 play Nine Pine Street, written with Carleton Miles, was based around the Lizzie Borden story. Lizzie Borden's character was changed to "Effie Holden", played by Lillian Gish. It ran for only 28 performances.

Colton suffered a stroke in 1945. He died of a second stroke in Gainesville, Texas in 1946. Colton, a gay man, never married.
