= Miss Sadie Thompson =

1953 film by Curtis Bernhardt

- Theatrical release poster
- Directed by: Curtis Bernhardt
- Screenplay by: Harry Kleiner
- Based on: "Miss Thompson" by W. Somerset Maugham
- Produced by: Jerry Wald
- Starring: Rita Hayworth; José Ferrer; Aldo Ray
- Cinematography: Charles Lawton Jr.
- Edited by: Viola Lawrence
- Color process: Technicolor
- Production company: The Beckworth Corporation
- Distributed by: Columbia Pictures
- Release date: December 23, 1953
- Running time: 91 minutes
- Country: United States
- Language: English
- Box office: $2.9 million (US)

Miss Sadie Thompson is a 1953 3-D American musical romantic drama film directed by Curtis Bernhardt and starring Rita Hayworth, José Ferrer, and Aldo Ray. The film was released by Columbia Pictures. The film is based on W. Somerset Maugham's 1921 short story "Miss Thompson" (later retitled "Rain"). Other film versions include Sadie Thompson (1928) starring Gloria Swanson, Rain (1932) starring Joan Crawford, and Dirty Gertie from Harlem U.S.A. (1946).

The film received a nomination for Best Original Song ("Sadie Thompson's Song") at the 26th Academy Awards.

== Plot ==
A bar girl from Hawaii, a religious zealot, and a love-struck Marine struggle with sin and salvation just after World War II while Sadie Thompson kicks out several songs, including "Blue Pacific Blues".

== Cast ==
- Rita Hayworth as Sadie Thompson
  - Jo Ann Greer as singing voice of Sadie Thompson
- José Ferrer as Alfred Davidson
- Aldo Ray as Sgt. Phil O'Hara
- Russell Collins as Dr. Robert MacPhail
- Diosa Costello as Ameena Horn
- Harry Bellaver as Joe Horn
- Wilton Graff as Governor
- Peggy Converse as Mrs. Margaret Davidson
- Henry Slate as Pvt. Griggs
- Rudy Bond as Pvt. Hodges
- Charles Bronson as Pvt. Edwards (as Charles Buchinsky)
- Frances Morri as Mrs. MacPhail

== Production ==
Aldo Ray and Rita Hayworth in Miss Sadie Thompson

In February 1952, producer Jerry Wald announced he had the film rights to the play adaptation of Rain from producer Lester Cowan. Wald had a production unit at RKO with Norman Krasna and wanted to make it as a musical in color. In October 1953, Wald left RKO to become a vice president and executive producer at Columbia Pictures. He planned to personally produce two films a year and said one of these would be Rain. It would star Rita Hayworth, who was the biggest star at the studio. Harry Kleiner was assigned to write the script. Plans were made to shoot the film in 3-D.

This was Hayworth's third film after her marriage to Prince Aly Khan had kept her off screen for four years. The public eagerly welcomed her return in two previous films Affair in Trinidad and Salome so Columbia gave Miss Sadie Thompson an "A" film budget.

"It would give her the chance to not be glamorous", said Wald.

3-D films had become a fad, with some 3-D films drawing huge crowds in major cities, so it was used as well. Exteriors were filmed on the island of Kauai, Hawaii and interiors on the Columbia lot.

The original story of sin and redemption was sanitized to appease the Production Code and several musical numbers were inserted to spice up the tepid reworked plot. As with her previous films, Hayworth's singing was dubbed; as with the previous year's Affair in Trinidad, that job was assigned to Jo Ann Greer. (Note: The pair would team up for the third and final time in 1957 for Pal Joey.)

In August 1953, Hayworth and Ray shot some additional romantic scenes.

By the time of the premiere on December 23, 1953, interest in 3-D had died down considerably. After a two-week run, all 3-D prints were pulled. The film was given a national release "flat", in other words, in regular prints, minus the 3-D.

The film was banned in some places, including Memphis.

== Reviews ==
Variety wrote, "She catches the feel of the title character well, even to braving completely deglamorizing makeup, costuming and photography to fit her physical appearance to that of the bawdy, shady lady that was Sadie Thompson". The Village Voice wrote, "Although its Hays Code sanitizing is mitigated somewhat by the glorious extravagances of 1950s cinema (it's a Technicolor, 3-D star vehicle with musical numbers), Miss Sadie Thompson (1953) is a scoured version of Rain (1932)." Bosley Crowther of The New York Times wrote, "The character of Sadie is drained of considerable point by the prudence of the producers. And Miss Hayworth is left with a role in which she is able to inject very little, outside her own particular brand of appeal".

== Availability ==
- A dual projection polarized 3-D print of Miss Sadie Thompson was screened at The World 3-D Expo 2006 September 10, 2006 at the Egyptian Theater in Hollywood, Ca.
- A 3-D version of the trailer can be seen in the Blu-ray Collection "3-D Rarities" from Flicker Alley.
- A VHS full screen edition of Miss Sadie Thompson was released in 1994 but is no longer available.
- A DVD full screen edition of Miss Sadie Thompson was released in 2001 but is no longer available.
- Another edition of the DVD is available as part of "The Films of Rita Hayworth" 5-disc box set.
- A 3D Blu-ray is now available in the US as of July 12, 2016, from Twilight Time Movies.
