= List of films financed by The Rank Organisation =

This is a list of notable films financed by J. Arthur Rank and The Rank Organisation

== 1930s ==
=== 1935 ===
| Year | Title | Company | Director | Producer | Star | Notes |
|---|---|---|---|---|---|---|
| 1935 | Turn of the Tide | British National | Norman Walker | John Corfield | Wilfrid Lawson | First film from Rank; distributed by Gaumont British |
| 1935 | The Iron Duke | Gaumont | Victor Saville | Michael Balcon | George Arliss | Biopic of Duke of Wellington |
| May 1935 | Heat Wave | Gainsborough | Maurice Elvey | Jerome Jackson | Albert Burdon | |
| Jun 1935 | The 39 Steps | Gaumont | Alfred Hitchcock | Ivor Montagu | Robert Donat, Madeleine Carroll | One of 20 most popular films of year |
| Jul 1935 | Boys Will Be Boys | Gainsborough | William Beaudine | | Will Hay | comedy |
| Jul 1935 | The Clairvoyant | Gaumont | Maurice Elvey | Michael Balcon | Claude Rains, Fay Wray | Co-production with Fox |
| Jul 1935 | Bulldog Jack | Gaumont | Walter Forde | Michael Balcon | Jack Hulbert | |
| Aug 1935 | Stormy Weather | Gainsborough | Tom Walls | Michael Balcon | Tom Walls | Based on farce by Ben Travers |
| September 1935 | Car of Dreams | Gainsborough | Graham Cutts, Austin Melford | Michael Balcon | Grete Mosheim | Musical; remake of Hungarian film |
| Oct 1935 | The Guv'nor | Gaumont | Milton Rosner | Michael Balcon | George Arliss | |
| Nov 1935 | Moscow Nights | London/Capital | Anthony Asquith | Alexis Granowsky, Alex Korda | Laurence Olivier, Harry Baur | Made with Alexander Korda |
| Nov 1935 | No Monkey Business | Radius | Marcel Varnel | Julius Haemann | Gene Gerrard | |
| Dec 1935 | Foreign Affaires | Gainsborough | Tom Walls | Michael Balcon | Tom Walls | Farce |

=== 1936 ===
| Year | Title | Company | Director | Producer | Star | Notes |
|---|---|---|---|---|---|---|
| Jan 1936 | Limelight | Wilcox | Herbert Wilcox | Herbert Wilcox | Anna Neagle | musical |
| Jan 1936 | The Improper Duchess | City | Harry Hughes | Maurice Browne | Yvonne Arnaud | Based on play |
| Feb 1936 | King of the Castle | City | Redd Davis | Basil Humphrys | June Clyde | |
| Feb 1936 | Rhodes of Africa | Gaumont | Berthold Viertel | Leslie Arliss | Walter Huston | biopic of Cecil Rhodes, shot in Rhodesia |
| Feb 1936 | When Knights Were Bold | Capital | Jack Raymond | Max Schach | Jack Buchanan, Fay Wray | musical |
| Feb 1936 | Public Nuisance No. 1 | Cecil | Marcel Varnel | Hermann Fellner, Max Schach | Frances Day | |
| Mar 1936 | Fame | Wilcox | Leslie S. Hiscott | Herbert Wilcox | Sydney Howard | |
| Mar 1936 | Debt of Honour | British National | Norman Walker | John Corfeld | Leslie Banks, Will Fyffe | |
| Apr 1936 | Pot Luck | Gainsborough | Tom Walls | Michael Balcon | Tom Walls, Ralph Lynn | Based on farce by Ben Travers |
| May 1936 | Love in Exile | Capitol | Alfred L. Werker | Max Schach | Helen Vinson | |
| May 1936 | The Marriage of Corbal | Capitol | Karl Grune | Max Schach | Nils Asther | historical drama |
| Jun 1936 | Seven Sinners | Gaumont | Albert de Courville | | Edmund Lowe, Constance Cummings | |
| Jun 1936 | The Secret Agent | Gaumont | Alfred Hitchcock | Michael Balcon | John Gielgud, Madeleine Carroll | Spy thriller |
| Aug 1936 | Where There's a Will | Gainsborough | William Beaudine | Michael Balcon | Will Hay | comedy |
| Aug 1936 | East Meets West | Gaumont | Herbert Mason | | George Arliss | |
| Sep 1936 | Tudor Rose | Gaumont | Robert Stevenson | Hubert Bath | John Mills | Story of Lady Jane Grey |
| Sep 1936 | Dishonour Bright | Cecil, Capitol | Tom Wallis | Hermann Fellner, Max Schach | Tom Walls | Based on farce by Ben Travers |
| Sep 1936 | Southern Roses | Capitol, Grafton | Frederic Zelnik | Max Schach, Isadore Goldsmith | George Robey | |
| 1936 | Millions | Wilcox | Leslie Hiscott | Herbert Wilcox | Gordon Harker | |
| Oct 1936 | Everything Is Thunder | Gaumont | Milton Rosner | | Constance Bennett | |
| Oct 1936 | Tropical Trouble | City | Harry Hughes | Basil Humphrys | Douglass Montgomery | |
| Oct 1936 | The Secret of Stamboul | Richard Wainwright | Andrew Marton | Richard Wainwright | Valerie Hobson | |
| Oct 1936 | Land Without Music | Capitol | Walter Forde | Max Schach | Richard Tauber | |
| Nov 1936 | This'll Make You Whistle | Wilcox | Herbert Wilcox | Herbert Wilcox | Jack Buchanan | musical |
| Dec 1936 | You Must Get Married | City | Lesley Pearce | Basil Humphrys | Frances Day | comedy |
| Dec 1936 | Windbag the Sailor | Gainsborough, Gaumont | William Beaudine | Michael Balcon | Will Hay | comedy |
| Dec 1936 | Sabotage | Gaumont | Alfred Hitchcock | Michael Balcon | Sylvia Sidney, Oscar Homolka | Based on novel by Joseph Conrad |

=== 1937 ===
| Year | Title | Company | Director | Producer | Star | Notes |
|---|---|---|---|---|---|---|
| 1937 | Splinters in the Air | Wilcox | Alfred J Goulding | Herbert Wilcox | Sydney Howard | |
| 1937 | Sunset in Vienna | Wilcox | Norman Walker | Herbert Wilcox | Lili Palmer | |
| Jan 1937 | Good Morning, Boys | Gainsborough | Marcel Varnel | Edward Black | Will Hay | Comedy |
| Jan 1937 | OHMS | Gaumont | Raoul Walsh | | Wallace Ford, John Mills | |
| Jan 1937 | Head Over Heels | Gaumont | Sonnie Hale | | Jessie Matthews | musical |
| Feb 1937 | The Great Barrier | Gaumont | Milton Rosner, Geoffrey Barkas | | Richard Arlen, Lili Palmer | Shot in Canada |
| Feb 1937 | London Melody | Wilcox | Herbert Wilcox | Herbert Wilcox | Anna Neagle | |
| Mar 1937 | For Valour | Capitol | Tom Walls | Max Schach | Tom Walls | Based on farce by Ben Travers |
| Mar 1937 | The Frog | Wilcox | Jack Raymond | Herbert Wilcox | Gordon Harker | |
| Apr 1937 | The Gang Show | | Alfred J. Goulding | Herbert Wilcox | Ralph Reader | |
| Apr 1937 | Our Fighting Navy | Wilcox | Norman Walker | Herbert Wilcox | Robert Douglas | |
| Apr 1937 | O-Kay for Sound | Gainsborough | Marcel Varnel | Edward Black | The Crazy Gang | comedy |
| May 1937 | Take My Tip | Gaumont | Herbert Mason | Michael Balcon | Jack Hulbert, Cecily Courtnidge | |
| Jun 1937 | King Solomon's Mines | Gaumont | Robert Stevenson | Michael Hogan | Paul Robeson | Based on novel by H Rider Haggard |
| Jul 1937 | Said O'Reilly to McNab | Gainsborough | William Beaudine | Edward Black | Will Mahoney, Will Fyffe | |
| Jul 1937 | Gangway | Gaumont | Sonnie Hale | | Jessie Matthews | musical comedy |
| Aug 1937 | School for Husbands | Richard Wainwright | Andrew Martin | Richard Wainwright | Rex Harrison | |
| Aug 1937 | Command Performance | Grosvernor Films | Sinclair Hill | Harcourt Templeman | | |
| Aug 1937 | Dr Syn | Gainsborough | Roy William Neil | Edward Black | George Arliss, Margaret Lockwood | Based on classic novel |
| Sep 1937 | Non-Stop New York | Gaumont | Robert Stevenson | | Anna Lee | |
| Sep 1937 | Smash and Grab | | Tim Whelan | Jack Buchanan | | Jack Buchanan |
| Oct 1937 | Oh, Mr Porter! | Gainsborough | Marcel Varnel | Edward Black | Will Hay | Comedy |
| Nov 1937 | Young and Innocent | Gaumont | Alfred Hitchcock | Edward Black | Nova Pilbeam | Thriller |

=== 1938 ===
| Year | Title | Company | Director | Producer | Star | Notes |
|---|---|---|---|---|---|---|
| 1938 | Alf's Button Afloat | Gainsborough | Marcel Varney | Edward Black | The Crazy Gang | |
| 1938 | A Spot of Bother | | David MacDonald | Anthony Havelock Allen | | |
| 1938 | Follow Your Star | | Sinclair Hill | Harcourt Templeman | Arthur Tracy | |
| 1938 | The Sky's the Limit | Jack Buchanan | | Jack Buchanan | Jack Buchanan | |
| Jan 1938 | Second Best Bed | Capitol | Tom Walls | Max Schach | Tom Walls | Based on farce by Ben Travers |
| Jan 1938 | Sweet Devil | Pinewood | | Jack Buchanan | | |
| Jan 1938 | Owd Bob | Gainsborough | Robert Stevenson | | | |
| Jan 1938 | Bank Holiday | Gainsborough | Carol Reed | Edward Black | Margaret Lockwood | comedy-drama |
| Mar 1938 | Kicking the Moon Around | | Walter Forde | | | |
| Apr 1938 | Sailing Along | Gaumont | Sonnie Hale | | Jessie Matthews | Musical |
| May 1938 | Strange Boarders | Gainsborough | Herbert Mason | Edward Black | Tom Walls | |
| Jun 1938 | Break the News | Jack Buchanan | Rene Clair | Rene Clair | Maurice Chevalier | |
| Aug 1938 | Kate Plus Ten | Richard Wainwright | Jeffrey Dell | Richard Wainwright | Jack Hulbert | |
| Sep 1938 | Convict 99 | Gainsborough | Marcel Varney | Edward Black | Will Hay | comedy |
| Oct 1938 | Hey! Hey! USA | Gainsborough | Marcel Varney | Michael Balcon | Will Hay | comedy |
| Oct 1938 | Crackerjack | Gainsborough | Albert de Courville | Edward Black | Tom Walls | |
| Oct 1938 | Pygmalion | | Anthony Asquith, Leslie Howard | Gabriel Pascal | Leslie Howard, Wendy Hill | Based on play by G.B. Shaw |
| Oct 1938 | The Lady Vanishes | Gaumont | Alfred Hitchcock | Edward Black | Margaret Lockwood, Michael Redgrave | Script by Launder and Gilliat |
| Oct 1938 | Lightning Conductor | Pinebrook | Maurice Elvey | Anthony Havelock Allen | Gordon Harker | |
| Dec 1938 | Old Bones of the River | | Marcel Varney | | Will Hay | Comedy spoof of Sanders films |

=== 1939 ===
| Year | Title | Company | Director | Producer | Star | Notes |
|---|---|---|---|---|---|---|
| Jan 1939 | The Mikado | | Victor Schertzinger | Geoffrey Toye | Kenny Baker | Based on play by Gilbert and Sullivan |
| Apr 1939 | A Girl Must Live | Gainsborough | Carol Reed | Edward Black | Margaret Lockwood | Comedy |
| Oct 1939 | On the Night of the Fire | | Brian Desmond Hurst | | Ralph Richardson | |
| Nov 1939 | The Arsenal Stadium Mystery | G & S Films | Thorold Dickinson | | Leslie Banks | |
| Nov 1939 | The Frozen Limits | Gainsborough | Marcel Varnel | Edward Black | The Crazy Gang | Comedy |

== 1940s ==
=== 1940 ===
| Year | Title | Company | Director | Producer | Star | Notes |
|---|---|---|---|---|---|---|
| Mar 1940 | Band Waggon | Gainsborough | Marcel Varney | Edward Black | Arthur Askey | Comedy based on BBC radio show |
| May 1940 | For Freedom | Gainsborough | Maurice Elvey | Edward Black | Will Fyffe | |
| Jun 1940 | A Window in London | G & S Films | Herbert Mason | | Michael Redgrave | |
| Aug 1940 | Charley's (Big-Hearted) Aunt | Gainborough | Walter Forde | Edward Black | Arthur Askey | Based on Brandon Thomas farce |
| Dec 1940 | Neutral Port | Gainsborough | Walter Forde | Edward Black | Will Fyffe | |

=== 1941 ===
| Year | Title | Company | Director | Producer | Star | Notes |
|---|---|---|---|---|---|---|
| Feb 1941 | Gasbags | Gainsborough | Walter Ford, Marcel Varnel | Edward Black | The Crazy Gang | |
| Feb 1941 | Freedom Radio | Two Cities | Anthony Asquith | Mario Zampi | | |
| Mar 1941 | Old Bill and Son | | Ian Dalyrymple | | | |
| May 1941 | The Ghost Train | Gainsborough | Walter Forde | Edward Black | Arthur Askey | Based on stage play |
| Aug 1941 | Major Barbara (1941) | Gabriel Pascal Productions | Gabriel Pascal | Gabriel Pascal | Rex Harrison, Wendy Hiller | Based on play by G.B. Shaw |
| Sep 1941 | Jeannie | | Harold French | Marcell Hellman | | |
| Sep 1941 | Cottage to Let | Gainsborough | Anthony Asquith | Edward Black | Leslie Banks | |
| Sep 1941 | He Found a Star | John Corfield Productions | John Paddy Carstairs | John Corfield | Vic Oliver | |
| Oct 1941 | The 49th Parallel | The Archers | Michael Powell | Powell & Pressberger | Laurence Olivier, Eric Portman | WW2 film, set in Canada |
| Oct 1941 | I Thank You | Gainsborough | Marcel Varney | Edward Black | Arthur Askey | |
| Dec 1941 | Hi Gang! | Gainsborough | Marcel Varnel | Edward Black | Bebe Daniels, Ben Lyon | |

=== 1942 ===
| Year | Title | Company | Director | Producer | Star | Notes |
|---|---|---|---|---|---|---|
| Apr 1942 | Back-Room Boy | Gainsborough | Herbert Mason | Edward Black | Arthur Askey | comedy |
| May 1942 | Hard Steel | GHW Productions | Norman Walker | James Sloan | Wilfrid Lawson | |
| Jun 1942 | The Day Will Dawn | | Harold French | Paul Soskin | Ralph Richardson | WW2, set in Norway |
| Aug 1942 | Unpublished Story | Two Cities | Harold French | Anthony Havelock-Allen | Richard Greene, Valeria Hobson | Co-production with Columbia |
| Aug 1942 | Uncensored | Gainsborough | Anthony Asquith | Edward Black | Eric Portman, Phyllis Calvert | WW2, set in Belgium |
| Sep 1942 | The First of the Few | | Leslie Howard | Leslie Howard | Leslie Howard, David Niven | WW2, Biopic of Mitchell |
| Oct 1942 | Secret Mission | Excelsior | Harold French | Marcell Hellman | Hugh Williams, James Mason | WW2 |
| Nov 1942 | The Great Mr. Handel | GWH Productions | Norman Walker | James Sloan | Wilfrid Lawson | Biopic of Handell |
| Sep 1942 | In Which We Serve | Two Cities | Noël Coward | Noël Coward | Noël Coward | WW2 film, one of biggest hits of the year |
| Dec 1942 | King Arthur Was a Gentleman | Gainsborough | Marcel Varney | Edward Black | Arthur Askey | comedy |

=== 1943 ===
| Year | Title | Company | Director | Producer | Star | Notes |
|---|---|---|---|---|---|---|
| Feb 1943 | It's That Man Again | Gainsborough | Walter Forde | Edward Black | Tommy Handley | |
| Mar 1943 | The Silver Fleet | The Archers | Vernon Sewell, Gordon Wellesley | Powell & Pressburger | Ralph Richardson | |
| Apr 1943 | We Dive at Dawn | Gainsborough | Anthony Asquith | Edward Black | Eric Portman, John Mills | WW2 |
| Apr 1943 | The Gentle Sex | Two Cities | Leslie Howard | Derrick de Marney | Joan Gates | WW2; Howard's last film; minor hit |
| Jun 1943 | The Life and Death of Colonel Blimp | The Archers | Powell & Pressberger | Powell & Pressberger | Roger Livesey, Deborah Kerr | One of biggest hits of the year |
| Aug 1943 | The Man in Grey | Gainsborough | Leslie Arliss | Edward Black | Margaret Lockwood, James Mason, Phyllis Calvert, Stewart Granger | First Gainsborough melodrama |
| Sep 1943 | The Flemish Farm | Two Cities | Jeffrey Dell | Sydney Box | Clive Brook | |
| Sep 1943 | Dear Octopus | Gainsborough | Harold French | Edward Black | Margaret Lockwood, Michael Wilding | Based on play by Dodie Smith; minor hit |
| Nov 1943 | They Met in the Dark | Excelsior | Karel Lamec | Marcel Hellman | James Mason | |
| Nov 1943 | Millions Like Us | Gainsborough | Sidney Gilliat, Frank Launder | Edward Black | Eric Portman, Pat Roc | WW2 |
| Nov 1943 | The Lamp Still Burns | Two Cities | Maurice Elvey | Leslie Howard | Rosamund John, Stewart Granger | Minor hit |
| Dec1943 | The Demi-Paradise | Two Cities | Anthony Asquith | Filippo Del Giudice, Anatole de Grunwald | Laurence Olivier | WW2 |

=== 1944 ===
| Year | Title | Company | Director | Producer | Star | Notes |
|---|---|---|---|---|---|---|
| Feb 1944 | On Approval | Independent | Clive Brook | Sydney Box | Clive Brook | Based on play by Lonsdale |
| Mar 1944 | Bees in Paradise | Gainsborough | Val Guest | Edward Black | Arthur Askey | comedy |
| Apr 1944 | Tawny Pipit | Prestige | Bernard Miles, Charles Saunders | William Sistrom | | |
| May 1944 | Fanny By Gaslight | Gainsborough | Anthony Asquith | Edward Black | James Mason, Stewart Granger, Phyllis Calvert, Jean Kent | 2nd Gainsborough melodrama, one of biggest hits of year |
| Jun 1944 | This Happy Breed | Two Cities | David Lean | Noël Coward | Robert Newton | Based on play by Noël Coward, one of biggest hits of year |
| Jun 1944 | The Way Ahead | Two Cities | Carol Reed | Norman Walker | David Niven | WW2; one of biggest hits of year |
| Jul 1944 | English Without Tears | Two Cities | Harold French | Anatole de Grunwald | Michael Wilding | Based on script by Terence Rattigan |
| Jul 1944 | Give Us the Moon | Gainsborough | Val Guest | Edward Black | Margaret Lockwood, Vic Oliver | |
| Aug 1944 | A Canterbury Tale | The Archers | Powell & Pressberger | Powell & Pressberger | Eric Portman | First P & P film to not be big hit |
| Oct 1944 | Mr. Emmanuel | Two Cities | Harold French | William Sistrom | Felix Aylmer | |
| Nov 1944 | Two Thousand Women | Gainsborough | Frank Launder | Edward Black | Phyllis Calvert, Pat Roc | minor hit |
| Nov 1944 | Love Story | Gainsborough | Leslie Arliss | Harold Huth | Stewart Granger, Margaret Lockwood, Pat Roc | Gainsborough melodrama, one of biggest hits of year |
| Nov 1944 | Don't Take It to Heart | Two Cities | Jeffrey Dell | Sydney Box | Richard Greene | |
| 1944 | Madonna of the Seven Moons | Gainsborough | Arthur Crabtree | R.J. Minney | Phyllis Calvert, Stewart Granger, Pat Roc | Gainsborough melodrama, one of biggest hits of year |

=== 1945 ===
| Year | Title | Company | Director | Producer | Star | Notes |
|---|---|---|---|---|---|---|
| Feb 1945 | Waterloo Road | Gainsborough | Sidney Gilliat | Edward Black | John Mills, Stewart Granger | Minor hit |
| 1945 | Henry V | Two Cities | Laurence Olivier | Filippo Del Guice | Laurence Olivier | Based on play by Shakespeare; minor hit |
| 1945 | A Place of One's Own | Gainsborough | Bernard Knowles | R.J. Minney | James Mason, Margaret Lockwood | Ghost story; minor hit |
| May 1945 | Blithe Spirit | Two Cities | David Lean | Noël Coward, Constance Cummings | Rex Harrison | Based on play by Noël Coward; minor hit |
| Jul 1945 | They Were Sisters | Gainsborough | Arthur Crabtree | Harold Huth | James Mason | Gainsborough melodrama; major hit |
| Jun 1945 | The Way to the Stars (1945) | Two Cities | Anthony Asquith | Anatole de Grunwald | Trevor Howard | WW2; minor hit |
| Jul 1945 | I'll Be Your Sweetheart | Gainsborough | Val Guest | Maurice Ostrer | Margaret Lockwood, Michael Rennie, Vic Oliver | musical; minor hit |
| Oct 1945 | Johnny Frenchman | Ealing | Charles Frend | Michael Balcon | Tom Walls, Pat Roc | |
| 1945 | They Knew Mr. Knight | | Norman Walker | | Mervyn Johns | |
| Sep 1945 | Dead of Night | Ealing | Alberto Cavalcanti, Charles Crichton, Robert Hamer, Basil Dearden | Michael Balcon | | horror anthology; minor hit |
| Oct 1945 | The Seventh Veil | | Compton Bennett | Sydney Box | James Mason, Ann Todd | One of biggest hits of the year |
| Nov 1945 | Brief Encounter (1945) | | David Lean | Noël Coward | Trevor Howard, Celia Johnson | Based on play by Noël Coward; major hit |
| Nov 1945 | I Know Where I'm Going! | The Archers | Powell & Pressburger | Powell & Pressburger | Wendy Hiller | Romantic comedy; minor hit |
| Nov 1945 | The Wicked Lady | Gainsborough | Leslie Arliss | R.J. Minney | Margaret Lockwood, James Mason, Pat Roc, Michael Rennie | Gainsborough melodrama; biggest hit of 1946 |
| Dec 1945 | Pink String and Sealing Wax | Ealing | Robert Hamer | Michael Balcon | Mervyn Johns, Googie Withers | |
| Dec 1945 | The Rake's Progress | Independent Producers | Sidney Gilliat | Launder & Gilliat | Rex Harrison | Comedy; hit |
| 1945 | Here Comes the Sun | | John Baxter | | Flanagan & Allen | comedy |

=== 1946 ===
| Year | Title | Company | Director | Producer | Star | Notes |
|---|---|---|---|---|---|---|
| 1946 | Caesar and Cleopatra | Gabriel Pascal | Gabriel Pascal | Gabriel Pascal | Claude Rains, Vivien Leigh, Stewart Granger | Based on play by Shaw; Very popular but hugely expensive |
| Apr 1946 | The Captive Heart | Ealing | Basil Dearden | Michael Relph | Michael Redgrave | Major hit |
| 1946 | Bedelia | John Corfield Productions | Lance Comfort | Isadore Goldsmith | Margaret Lockwood | melodrama; minor hit |
| Jun 1946 | Caravan | Gainsborough | Arthur Crabtree | Harold Huth | Stewart Granger, Jean Kent, Dennis Price | Gainsborough melodrama, one of biggest hits of year |
| Apr 1946 | The Years Between | Sydney Box | Compton Bennett | Sydney Box | Michael Redgrave | Minor hit |
| 1946 | Beware of Pity | Two Cities | Maurice Elvey | | Lili Palmer | |
| 1946 | I See a Dark Stranger | | Frank Launder | Gilliat & Launder | Deborah Kerr, Trevor Howard | spy thriller |
| Sep 1946 | Men of Two Worlds | Two Cities | Thorold Dickinson | | Eric Portman, Phyllis Calvert | Shot in Africa; minor hit but hugely expensive |
| Sep 1946 | London Town | | Wesley Ruggles | | Sid Field | musical; minor hit but hugely expensive |
| Nov 1946 | The Magic Bow | Gainsborough | Bernard Knowles | R.J. Minney | Stewart Granger, Phyllis Calvert | Gainsborough melodrama; minor hit |
| 1946 | The Overlanders | Ealing | Harry Watt | Leslie Norman, Michael Balcon | Chips Rafferty | Shot in Australia; one of years biggest hits |
| Dec 1946 | Carnival | Two Cities | Stanley Haynes | | Sally Grey | |
| Dec 1946 | A Matter of Life and Death (1946) | Archers | Powell & Pressburger | Powell & Pressburger | David Niven, Kim Stanley | Minor hit; first Royal Film Performance |
| 1946 | School for Secrets | Two Cities | Peter Ustinov | | Ralph Richardson | |
| 1946 | Great Expectations | Cineguild | David Lean | Anthony Havelock-Allan, Ronald Neame | John Mills, Alec Guinness | Based on novel by Dickens; one of biggest hits of 1947 |
| Dec 1946 | Green for Danger | Individual Pictures | Sidney Gilliat | Launder & Gilliat | Sally Gray, Rosamund John | Minor hit |
| 1946 | Daybreak | | Comptom Bennett | Sydney Box | Eric Portman, Ann Todd | Not released until 1948 |

=== 1947 ===
| Year | Title | Company | Director | Producer | Star | Notes |
|---|---|---|---|---|---|---|
| Jan 1947 | Hungry Hill | Two Cities | Brian Desmond Hurst | William Sistrom, Dennis Price | Margaret Lockwood | melodrama; commercial disappointment |
| Feb 1947 | Odd Man Out (1947) | Two Cities | Carol Reed | Carol Reed | James Mason | IRA thriller; one of biggest hits of year |
| Feb 1947 | The Root of All Evil | Gainsborough | Brock Williams | Harold Huth | Phyllis Calvert | melodrama |
| Feb 1947 | Hue and Cry | Ealing | Charles Crichton | Michael Balcon | Alistair Sim | minor hit |
| Mar 1947 | Nicholas Nickleby | Ealing | Cavalcanti | Michael Balcon | Cedric Hardwick | Based on Dickens novel; minor hit |
| Apr 1947 | The Man Within | Production Film Service | Bernard Knowles | Sydney Box, Muriel Box | Michael Regrave, Jean Kent | Not profitable |
| May 1947 | Black Narcissus (1947) | Archers | Powell & Pressburger | Powell & Pressburger | Deborah Kerr | Set in India; major hit |
| May 1947 | Take My Life | Cineguild | Ronald Neame | Anthony Havelock-Allen | Hugh Williams | |
| Jul 1947 | The Brothers | Gainsborough | David MacDonald | Sydney Box | Pat Roc, Maxwell Reed | melodrama; Lost money |
| Jun 1947 | Bush Christmas | CEF | Ralph Smart | Ralph Smart | Chips Rafferty | Shot in Australia; minor hit |
| May 1947 | Dear Murderer | Gainsborough | Arthur Crabtree | Betty Box | Eric Portman, Greta Gynt | |
| Jun 1947 | The Loves of Joanna Godden | Ealing | Charles Frend | Michael Balcon | Googie Withers, Jean Kent | |
| Jun 1947 | Frieda | Ealing | Basil Dearden | Michael Relph | Mai Zetterling | post-WW2 romance; major hit |
| Jun 1947 | The Upturned Glass | Triton | Lawrence Huntington | James Mason | James Mason | film noir; major hit |
| Aug 1947 | Holiday Camp | Gainsborough | Ken Annakin | Sydney Box | Jack Warner, Flora Robson | major hit |
| Aug 1947 | Jassy | Gainsborough | Bernard Knowles | Sydney Box | Margaret Lockwood | Gainsborough melodrama, one of years biggest hits |
| Sep 1947 | Master of Bankdam | Holbein | Walter Forde | | Anne Crawford | |
| Aug 1947 | Captain Boycott | Individual | Frank Launder | Gilliat & Launder | Stewart Granger | historical film; minor hit |
| Aug 1947 | The October Man | Two Cities | Roy Ward Baker | Roy Ward Baker | John Mills | minor hit |
| Sep 1947 | Fame is the Spur | | Roy Boulting | John Boulting | Michael Redgrave | |
| Oct 1947 | Uncle Silas | | Charles Frank | | Jean Simmons | |
| Oct 1947 | The White Unicorn | John Corfield | Bernard Knowles | | Margaret Lockwood, Joan Greenwood | |
| Dec 1947 | The End of the River | Archers | Derek Twist | Powell & Pressberger | Sabu | |
| Oct 1947 | The Woman in the Hall | Wessex | Jack Lee | Ian Dalrymple | Ursula Jeans, Jean Simmons | |
| Nov 1947 | It Always Rains on Sunday | Ealing | Robert Hamer | Michael Balcon | Googie Withers | major hit |
| Nov 1947 | When the Bough Breaks | Gainsborough | Lawrence Huntington | Betty Box | Pat Roc | Gainsborough melodrama; minor hit |

=== 1948 ===
| Year | Title | Company | Director | Producer | Star | Notes |
|---|---|---|---|---|---|---|
| Jan 1948 | The Mark of Cain | Two Cities | Brian Desmond Hurst | W.P. Lipscomb | Eric Portman | |
| Jan 1948 | Vice Versa | Two Cities | Peter Ustinov | George H. Brown | Roger Livesey | Comedy |
| Jan 1948 | Easy Money | Gainsborough | Bernard Knowles | A. Frank Bundy | Greta Gynt | |
| Feb 1948 | Against the Wind | Ealing | Charles Crichton | Michael Balcon | | War movie |
| Feb 1948 | Blanche Fury | Cineguild | Marc Allegret | Anthony Havelock-Allan | Stewart Granger, Valerie Hobson | melodrama |
| 1948 | Miranda | Gainsborough | Ken Annakin | Betty Box | Glynis Johns | mermaid comedy, one of hits of year |
| Apr 1948 | Broken Journey | Gainsborough | Ken Annakin | | Phyllis Calvert | |
| Apr 1948 | One Night with You | Two Cities | Terence Young | | | |
| Apr 1948 | Good-Time Girl | Gainsborough | David MacDonald | Sydney Box | Jean Kent | |
| Apr 1948 | Corridor of Mirrors | Apollo | Terence Young | Rudolph Cartier | Eric Portman | |
| Jul 1948 | The Calendar | Gainsborough | Arthur Crabtree | Antony Darnborough | John McCallum | Based on story by Edgar Wallace |
| May 1948 | Hamlet | Two Cities | Laurence Olivier | Laurence Olivier | Laurence Olivier | Based on play by Shakespeare; big hit |
| Jun 1948 | My Sister and I | Burnham | Harold Huth | John Corfield, Harold Huth | Sally Ann Howes | |
| Jun 1948 | Oliver Twist | Cineguild | David Lean | Ronald Neame | Alec Guinness, Robert Newton | Based on novel by Dickens |
| Aug 1948 | My Brother's Keeper | Gainsborough | Alfred Roome | Sydney Box | Jack Warner | |
| Aug 1948 | London Belongs to Me | Individual Pictures | Sidney Gilliat | Gilliat & Launder | Richard Attenborough, Alistair Sim | |
| Sep 1948 | The Red Shoes | Archers | Powell & Pressburger | Powell & Pressburger | Moira Shearer | ballet film |
| 1948 | Mr. Perrin and Mr. Traill | Two Cities | Laurence Huntington | | | |
| 1948 | Saraband for Dead Lovers | Ealing | Basil Dearden | Michael Relph, Michael Balcon | Stewart Granger | historical melodrama |
| Sep 1948 | The Weaker Sex | Two Cities | Roy Ward Baker | Paul Soskin | Ursula Jeans | |
| Oct 1948 | The Blind Goddess | Gainsborough | Harold French | Harold French, Betty Box | Eric Portman | |
| Sep 1948 | Esther Waters | Wessex Film | Ian Dalrymple, Peter Proud | Ian Dalrymple, Peter Proud | Dirk Bogarde | |
| Oct 1948 | Sleeping Car to Trieste | Two Cities | John Paddy Carstairs | George Brown | Jean Kent | thriller |
| Oct 1948 | Woman Hater | Two Cities | Terence Young | William Sistrom | Stewart Granger | comedy |
| Oct 1948 | Quartet | Gainsborough | Ken Annakin, Arthur Crabtree, Harold French, Ralph Smart | Anthony Darnborough | | Anthology based on stores of Somerset Maugham |
| Nov 1948 | Here Come the Huggetts | Gainsborough | Ken Annakin | Betty E. Box | Jack Warner | 2nd Huggett film |
| Nov 1948 | It's Hard to Be Good | Two Cities | Jeffrey Dell | John W. Gossage | Anne Crawford | |
| 1948 | Another Shore | Ealing | Charles Crichton | Michael Balcon | Robert Beatty | |
| Nov 1948 | Scott of the Antarctic | Ealing | Charles Frend | Michael Balcon | John Mills | One of years biggest hits |
| Jan 1949 | The Fool and the Princess | Film Producers Guild | William C Hammond | Frank A. Hoare | Bruce Lester | |
| Dec 1948 | Look Before You Love | Burnham | Harold Huth | | Margaret Lockwood | |
| 1948 | Once a Jolly Swagman | Wessex | Jack Lee | Ian Dalrymple | Dirk Bogarde | |
| Jan 1949 | Portrait from Life | Gainsborough | Terence Fisher | Antony Darnborough | Mai Zetterling | |

=== 1949 ===
Film
| Year | Title | Company | Director | Producer | Star | Notes |
|---|---|---|---|---|---|---|
| Jan 1949 | Warning to Wantons | Acquila | Donald Wilson | Donald Wilson | Harold Warrender | |
| Jan 1949 | Third Time Lucky | Anglofilm | Gordon Parry | Mario Zampi | Glynis Johns, Dermot Walsh | gambling story |
| Jan 1949 | Eureka Stockade | Ealing | Harry Watt | Leslie Norman, Michael Balcon | Chips Rafferty | Shot in Australia; big flop |
| Feb 1949 | Once Upon a Dream | Sydney Box | Ralph Thomas | Sydney Box | Googie Withers | Comedy, Ralph Thomas' directorial debut |
| Jan 1949 | The Passionate Friends (1949) | Cineguild | Ronald Neame | David Leane | Ann Todd, Claude Rains | Based on novel by HG Wells |
| Feb 1949 | Vote for Huggett | Gainsborough | Ken Annakin | Betty E Box | Jack Warner | 3rd Huggett film |
| Mar 1949 | The History of Mr. Polly | Two Cities | Anthony Pelissier | John Mills | John Mills | |
| Apr 1949 | All Over the Town | Wessex Film | Derek Twist | Ian Dalrymple | Norman Wooland | |
| Mar 1949 | The Blue Lagoon (1949) | Individual Pictures | Frank Launder | Gilliat & Launder | Jean Simmons, Donald Houston | Shot in Fiji, one of biggest hits of year |
| May 1949 | Fools Rush In | Pinewood | John Paddy Carstairs | Aubrey Baring | Sally Anne Howes | |
| April 1949 | The Bad Lord Byron | Triton | David MacDonald | Aubrey Baring | Dennis Price | Big flop |
| Mar 1949 | Floodtide | Acquila | Frederick Wilson | Donald B. Wilson | Gordon Jackson | |
| Apr 1949 | It's Not Cricket | Gainsborough | Alfred Roome, Roy Rich | Betty Box | Basil Radford, Naunton Wayne | Comedy |
| May 1949 | A Boy, a Girl and a Bike | Gainsborough | Ralph Smart | Ralph Keene, Alfred Roome | John McCallum, Honor Blackman | |
| Apr 1949 | Passport to Pimlico | Ealing | Henry Cornelius | Michael Balcon | Margaret Rutherford | Comedy |
| May 1949 | The Huggetts Abroad | Gainsborough | Ken Annakin | Betty Box | Jack Warner | Fourth (and last) Huggett movie |
| May 1949 | Adam and Evelyne | Two Cities | Harold French | Harold French | Stewart Granger, Jean Simmons | Comedy |
| May 1949 | The Perfect Woman | Two Cities | Bernard Knowles | Alfred Black, George Black | Pat Roc, Stanley Holloway | Comedy |
| Jun 1949 | Stop Press Girl | Aquila | Michael Barry | John Croyson | Sally Ann Howes | |
| Jun 1949 | Marry Me | Gainsborough | Terrence Fisher | Betty Box | Derek Bond | comedy, flop |
| Jun 1949 | Christopher Columbus | Gainsborough | David MacDonald | Sydney Box | Fredric March | Biopic, huge flop |
| Jun 1949 | Whisky Galore | Ealing | Alexander Mackendrick | Michael Balcon | Joan Greenwood | Comedy |
| Jun 1949 | Kind Hearts and Coronets | Ealing | Robert Hamer | Michael Balcon | Alec Guinness, Dennis Price | comedy |
| Jul 1949 | Poet's Pub | Aquila | Frederick Wilson | Donald Wilson | Derek Bond | |
| Aug 1949 | Obsession | Independent Sovereign | Edward Dmytryk | Nat A. Bronstein, Kenneth Horne | Robert Newton, Sally Gray | Based on A Man About a Dog |
| Aug 1949 | Helter Skelter | Gainsborough | Ralph Thomas | Antony Darnborough | David Tomlinson | comedy |
| Jul 1949 | Don't Ever Leave Me | Gainsborough | Arthur Crabtree | Betty Box | Petula Clark | comedy |
| Aug 1949 | Madness of the Heart | Two Cities | Charles Bennett | Richard Wainwright | Margaret Lockwood | melodrama, minor hit |
| Aug 1949 | Trottie True | Two Cities | Brian Desmond Hurst | Hugh Stewart | Jean Kent | musical |
| Aug 1949 | Train of Events | Ealing | Sidney Cole, Charles Crichton, Basil Dearden | Michael Relph | Peter Finch | multi story film |
| Aug 1949 | The Lost People | Gainsborough | Muriel Box, Bernard Knowles | Gordon Wellesley | Mai Zetterling | lost money |
| Sept 1949 | Dear Mr. Prohack | Wessex | Thorton Freeland | Ian Dalrymple | Cecil Parker | |
| 1949 | The Chiltern Hundreds | Two Cities | John Paddy Carstairs | George H. Brown | Cecil Parker | Based on play |
| Sept 1949 | Diamond City | Gainsborough | David MacDonald | Alex Bryce, S. Frank Bundy | David Farrar, Diana Dors | Shot in South Africa, big flop |
| Oct 1949 | Give Us This Day | Plantagenet | Edward Dymttryk | N.A. Bronsten, Rod E. Geiger | Sam Wanamaker | |
| Dec 1949 | The Spider and the Fly | Mayflower | Robert Hamer | Aubrey Baring, Maxwell Setton | Eric Portman | First from Baring and Setton team, shot in Paris |
| Nov 1949 | A Run for Your Money | Ealing | Charles Frend | Michael Balcon, Leslie Norman | Donald Houston | Comedy |
| Nov 1949 | The Romantic Age | Pinnacle | Edmond T. Gréville | Edward Dryhurst, Eric L'Epine Smith | Hugh Williams | |
| Dec 1949 | Boys in Brown (1949) | Gainsborough | Montgomery Tully | Antony Darnborough | Jack Warner, Richard Attenborough | |
| Nov 1949 | The Rocking Horse Winner (1949) | Two Cities | Anthony Pelissier | John Mills | | fantasy comedy |
| 1949 | Traveller's Joy | Gainsborough | Ralph Thomas | Antony Darnborough | Googie Withers | |
| Mar 1949 | Cardboard Cavalier | Two Cities | Walter Forde | Walter Forde | Sid Field, Margaret Lockwood | historical comedy |

== 1950s ==
=== 1950 ===
Film
| Year | Title | Company | Director | Producer | Star | Notes |
|---|---|---|---|---|---|---|
| Jan 1950 | The Blue Lamp | Ealing | Basil Dearden | Michael Relph | Dirk Bogarde, Jack Warner | Biggest hit of 1950, inspired Dixon of Dock Green |
| Feb 1950 | Golden Salamander | Pinewood | Ronald Neame | Alexander Galperson | Trevor Howard | |
| Feb 1950 | Madeleine | | David Lean | Sydney Haynes | Ann Todd | based on true story |
| Feb 1950 | Morning Departure | | Roy Ward Baker | Jay Lewis | John Mills | Based on stage play. Box Office success. |
| Mar 1950 | The Astonished Heart | Gainsborough | Terence Fisher | Anthony Darnborough | Noël Coward | Based on play by Noël Coward |
| 29 Mar 1950 | They Were Not Divided | Two Cities | Terence Young | Herbert Smith | | Box office hit |
| May 1950 | The Reluctant Widow | Two Cities | Bernard Knowles | Gordon Wellesley | Jean Kent | |
| May 1950 | Prelude to Fame | Two Cities | Fergus McDonnell | Donald Wilson | Guy Rolfe | |
| May 1950 | So Long at the Fair | | Terence Fisher, Anthony Darnbrough | Betty Box | Jean Simmons, Dirk Bogarde | |
| June 1950 | Dance Hall | Ealing | Charles Crichton | Michael Balcon | Diana Dors | social realism |
| Jun 1950 | Tony Draws a Horse (1950) | Pinnacle | John Paddy Carstairs | Brock Williams | Cecil Parker | comedy |
| July 1950 | Waterfront | Conqueror | Michael Anderson | Paul Soskin | Robert Newton | |
| 1950 | Bitter Springs | Ealing | Ralph Smart | Michael Balcon, Leslie Norman | Chips Rafferty | Shot in Australia |
| Aug 1950 | Trio | Gainsborough | Ken Annakin, Harold French | Anthony Darnborough | Jean Simmons, Michael Rennie | Co-financed with Paramount Pictures; Based on stories by Somerset Maugham. Box office hit. |
| Sep 1950 | Cage of Gold | Ealing | Basil Dearden | Michael Balcon | Jean Simmons | |
| Oct 1950 | The Woman in Question | | Anthony Asquith | | Jean Kent, Dirk Bogarde | |
| 1950 | The Magnet | Ealing | Charles Frend | Michael Balcon | Stephen Murray | |
| Nov 1950 | The Clouded Yellow | Carillon | Ralph Thomas | Betty Box | Jean Simmons, Trevor Howard | thriller |
| 1950 | Highly Dangerous | Two Cities | Roy Ward Baker | Anthony Darnborough | Margaret Lockwood | comedy thriller |

=== 1951 ===
Film
| Year | Title | Company | Director | Producer | Star | Notes |
|---|---|---|---|---|---|---|
| 1951 | The Adventurers | Mayflower | David MacDonald | Aubrey Baring | Jack Hawkins | Shot in South Africa |
| Jan 1951 | Blackmailed | | Marc Allegret | Harold Huth | Dirk Bogarde, Mai Zetterling | |
| Jan 1951 | The Dark Man | Independent Artists | Jeffrey Dell | Julian Wintle | Edward Underdown | |
| Feb 1951 | Pool of London | Ealing | Basil Dearden | Michael Balcon | Bonar Colleano | |
| Mar 1951 | The Browning Version | | Anthony Asquith | | Michael Redgrave | Based on play by Terence Rattigan |
| Jun 1951 | White Corridors | | Pat Jackson | | Googie Withers | |
| Jun 1951 | The Lavender Hill Mob | Ealing | Charles Crichton | Michael Balcon | Alec Guinness | One of biggest hits of the year |
| Jul 1951 | Hotel Sahara | | Ken Annakin | | Peter Ustinov | WW2, comedy |
| Aug 1951 | The Man in the White Suit | Ealing | Alexander Mackendrick | Michael Balcon | Alec Guinness | One of biggest hits of the year |
| Sept 1951 | Valley of Eagles | | Terence Young | Nat Bronstein | Jack Warner | |
| Oct 1951 | Appointment with Venus | | Ralph Thomas | Betty Box | David Niven | WW2 |
| Nov 1951 | High Treason | Conqueror | Roy Boulting | Paul Soskin | | Sequel to Seven Days to Noon |
| Nov 1951 | Where No Vultures Fly | Ealing | Harry Watt | Michael Balcon, Leslie Norman | Anthony Steel | Shot in Kenya, one of biggest hits of year |
| 1951 | Encore | Two Cities | | Anthony Darnborough | | Co-financed with Paramount; Based on stories by Somerset Maugham, one of biggest hits of year |

=== 1952 ===
| Year | Title | Company | Director | Producer | Star | Notes |
|---|---|---|---|---|---|---|
| 1952 | His Excellency | | | | | |
| 1952 | Secret People | Ealing | Thorold Dickinson | | Valentina Cortese | |
| 1952 | Hunted | Independent Artists | Charles Crichton | Julian Wintle | Dirk Bogarde | |
| 1952 | The Card | | Ronald Neame | | Alec Guinness | |
| Mar 1952 | I Believe in You | Ealing | Michael Relph, Basil Dearden | Michael Relph, Basil Dearden | Celia Johnson | |
| May 1952 | Curtain Up | | Ralph Smart | | | |
| Jun 1952 | The Important of Being Earnest | Javelin | Anthony Asquith | | Michael Redgrave | Based on play |
| Jul 1952 | Something Money Can't Buy | | Pat Jackson | Joseph Janni | Anthony Steel, Pat Roc | Comedy |
| Aug 1952 | Penny Princess | | Val Guest | | Dirk Bogarde | |
| 1952 | Mandy | Ealing | Alexander Mackendrick | Michael Balcon, Leslie Norman | Jack Hawkins, Phyllis Calvert | One of biggest hits of year |
| 1952 | Meet Me Tonight | | | | | Based on stories by Noël Coward |
| Sept 1952 | The Planter's Wife | Pinnacle | Ken Annakin | John Stafford | Jack Hawkins, Claudette Colbert, Anthony Steel | Set in Malayan Emergency |
| 1952 | Venetian Bird | | Ralph Thomas | Betty Box | Richard Todd | |
| Oct 1952 | The Gentle Gunman | | Basil Dearden | Michael Relph | Dirk Bogarde, John Mills | |
| Oct 1952 | It Started in Paradise | | Compton Bennett | | Jane Hylton | |
| Nov 1952 | Made in Heaven | Fanfare | John Paddy Carstairs | George H. Brown | David Tomlinson, Petula Clark | Comedy |

=== 1953 ===
Film
| Year | Title | Company | Director | Producer | Star | Notes |
|---|---|---|---|---|---|---|
| Jan 1953 | The Long Memory | | Robert Hamer | Hugh Stewart | John Mills, John McCallum | |
| Feb 1953 | The Net | Two Cities | Anthony Asquith | Anthony Darnborough | Phyllis Calvert, James Donald | |
| Feb 1953 | Top of the Form | British Filmmakers | John Paddy Carstairs | Paul Soskin | Ronald Shiner | |
| Mar 1953 | The Titfield Thunderbolt | Ealing | Charles Crichton | Michael Truman | Stanley Holloway | Ealing comedy |
| Mar 1953 | Street Corner | London Independent | Muriel Box | Sydney Box | Peggy Cummins, Terence Morgan | Commercial failure |
| Mar 1953 | Desperate Moment | Fanfare | Compton Bennett | George Brown | Dirk Bogarde, Mai Zetterling | |
| Apr 1953 | The Final Test | | Anthony Asquith | | Robert Morley, Jack Warner | Based on play by Terence Rattigan; cricket related |
| Mar 1953 | The Cruel Sea | Ealing | Charles Frend | Michael Balcon, Leslie Norman | Jack Hawkins | WW2, biggest hit of year |
| Apr 1953 | Turn the Key Softly | | Jack Lee | Maurice Cowan | Yvonne Mitchell | |
| May 1953 | Genevieve | Rank | Henry Cornelius | Henry Cornelius | John Gregson, Kenneth More, Dinah Sheridan, Kay Kendall | One of biggest hits of year |
| Jun 1953 | Malta Story | Theta | Brian Desmond Hurst | Peter De Sarigny | Alec Guinness, Jack Hawkins, Anthony Steel | WW2, one of biggest hits of year |
| Jul 1953 | The Square Ring | Ealing | Basil Dearden | Michael Relph | Jack Warner, Robert Beatty | Based on play by Ralph Petersen |
| Jul 1953 | Wheel of Fate | | Francis Searle | Francis Searle | Patric Doonan | |
| Aug 1953 | Always a Bride | Clarion | Ralph Smart | | Peggy Cummins, Terence Morgan | |
| Nov 1953 | A Day to Remember | | Ralph Thomas | Betty Box | Stanley Holloway, Donald Sinden | comedy |
| Oct 1953 | Personal Affair | Two Cities | Anthony Pelissier | Anthony Darnborough | Gene Tierney | |
| Dec 1953 | Small Town Story | | Montgomery Tully | | Susan Shaw, Donald Houston | |
| Nov 1953 | Meet Mr Lucifer | Ealing | Anthony Pelisser | Monja Danischewsky | Stanley Holloway, Peggy Cummins | comedy |
| Dec 1953 | Trouble in Store | Two Cities | John Paddy Carstairs | Maurice Cowan | Norman Wisdom | Wisdom's first starring vehicle, one of biggest hits of 1954 |
| Dec 1953 | The Kidnappers | | Philip Leacock | | Jon Whiteley | |

=== 1954 ===
| Year | Title | Company | Director | Producer | Star | Notes |
|---|---|---|---|---|---|---|
| Jan 1954 | The Million Pound Note | Group Film | Ronald Neame | | Gregory Peck | Co‐financed with United Artists; Based on story by Mark Twain |
| Jan 1954 | The Love Lottery | Ealing | Charles Crichton | Monja Danischewsky | David Niven, Peggy Cummins | |
| Feb 1954 | The Maggie | Ealing | Alexander Mackendrick | Michael Balcon | Paul Douglas | Ealing comedy |
| Feb 1954 | You Know What Sailors Are | Group Film | Ken Annakin | | Akim Tamiroff | |
| Feb 1954 | Fast and Loose | Group Film | Gordon Parry | | Stanley Holloway, Kay Kendall | |
| Feb 1954 | Star of My Night | | Paul Dickson | | Griffith Jones | |
| Mar 1954 | Doctor in the House | Group Film | Ralph Thomas | Betty Box | Dirk Bogarde, Kenneth More, Kay Kendall | First "Doctor" movie, biggest hit of year |
| Mar 1954 | West of Zanzibar | Ealing | Harry Watt | Leslie Norman | Anthony Steel | Shot in East Africa; sequel to Where No Vultures Fly |
| May 1954 | Forbidden Cargo | London Independent | Harold French | Sydney Box | Nigel Patrick | |
| May 1954 | The Rainbow Jacket | Ealing | Basil Dearden | Michael Relph | | |
| 1954 | The Seekers | | Ken Annakin | George Brown | Jack Hawkins | Set in New Zealand |
| Aug 1954 | Up to His Neck | Group Film | John Paddy Carstairs | Hugh Stewart | Ronald Shiner | comedy |
| Aug 1954 | The Beachcomber | London Independent | Muriel Box | Sydney Box | Robert Newton | Remake of 1938 film |
| Aug 1954 | The Young Lovers | Group Film | Anthony Asquith | Anthony Havelock-Allen | Odile Versois, David Knight | |
| Sep 1954 | Romeo and Juliet | | Renato Castellani | | Laurence Harvey | Based on play by Shakespeare; shot in Italy |
| Sep 1954 | The Purple Plain | Two Cities | Robert Parrish | John Bryan | Gregory Peck | Co‐financed with United Artists; WW2 |
| Oct 1954 | Lease of Life | Ealing | Charles Frend | Jack Rix | | |
| Nov 1954 | Mad About Men | Group Film | Ralph Thomas | Betty Box | Glynis Johns, Donald Sinden | Sequel to Miranda |
| Nov 1954 | The Divided Heart | Ealing | Charles Crichton | Michael Truman | Cornell Borchers | |
| 1954 | One Good Turn | Two Cities | John Paddy Carstairs | Maurice Cowan | Norman Wisdom | comedy; one of biggest hits of 1955 |

=== 1955 ===
| Year | Title | Company | Director | Producer | Star | Notes |
|---|---|---|---|---|---|---|
| Jan 1955 | To Paris with Love | Two Cities | Robert Hamer | Anthony Darnboeough | Alec Guinness | Shot in Paris |
| Jan 1955 | Simba | Group Film | Brian Desmond Hurst | Peter de Sarigny | Dirk Bogarde, Virginia McKenna | Set in Kenya during Mau Mau |
| Feb 1955 | Out of the Clouds | Ealing | Basil Dearden | Michael Relph, Eric Williams | Anthony Steel, Robert Beatty | Aeroplane drama |
| Mar 1955 | As Long as They're Happy | Group Film | J. Lee Thompson | Raymond Stross | Jack Buchanan, Diana Dors | comedy |
| Mar 1955 | The Night My Number Came Up | Ealing | Leslie Norman | Michael Balcon | Michael Redgrave | drama |
| Mar 1955 | Above Us the Waves | Rank, London Independent | Ralph Thomas | William MacQuitty | John Mills, John Gregson | WW2, one of biggest hits of the year |
| Apr 1955 | The Ship That Died of Shame | Ealing | Basil Dearden | Michael Relph | Richard Attenborough | WW2 |
| Apr 1955 | Passage Home | Group Film | Roy Ward Baker | Julian Wintle | Peter Finch, Anthony Steel, Diane Cilento | ship drama |
| Jul 1955 | Doctor at Sea | Group Film | Ralph Thomas | Betty Box | Dirk Bogarde, Brigitte Bardot | Doctor #2, one of biggest hits of the year |
| Aug 1955 | Value for Money | Group Film | Ken Annakin | Sergei Nolbandov | John Gregson, Diana Dors | comedy |
| Aug 1955 | The Woman for Joe | Group Film | George More O'Ferrall | Leslie Parkyn | Diane Cilento | |
| Nov 1955 | Man of the Moment | Group Film | John Paddy Carstairs | Hugh Stewart | Norman Wisdom | comedy |
| 1955 | Touch and Go | Ealing | Michael Truman | Michael Balcon | Jack Hawkins | |
| 1955 | Simon and Laura | Group Film | Muriel Box | Teddy Baird | Peter Finch, Kay Kendall | Based on hit play |
| Dec 1955 | An Alligator Named Daisy | Group Film | J. Lee Thompson | Raymond Stross | Donald Sinden, Diana Dors | comedy |
| Dec 1955 | The Ladykillers | Ealing | Alexander Mackendrick | Michael Balcon | Alec Guinness | comedy |
| Dec 1955 | All for Mary | Group Film | Wendy Toye | Paul Soskin | Nigel Patrick, Kathleen Harrison | comedy |

=== 1956 ===
Film
| Year | Title | Company | Director | Producer | Star | Notes |
|---|---|---|---|---|---|---|
| Jan 1956 | Lost | Sydney Box Productions/Rank | Guy Green | Vivian Cox | David Farrar | thriller |
| Feb 1956 | Jumping for Joy | Rank | John Paddy Carstairs | Raymond Stross | Frankie Howerd | comedy |
| Mar 1956 | A Town Like Alice | Vic Films/Rank | Jack Lee | Joseph Janni | Virginia McKenna, Peter Finch | WW2, one of biggest hits of year |
| Mar 1956 | Who Done It? | Ealing | Basil Dearden | Michael Relph, Michael Balcon | Benny Hill, Belinda Lee | comedy |
| Mar 1956 | The Black Tent | Rank | Brian Desmond Hurst | William MacQuitty | Anthony Steel, Donald Sinden | WW2, Shot in Libya |
| Mar 1956 | The Feminine Touch | Ealing | Pat Jackson | Michael Balcon | Belinda Lee, George Baker | nurse drama |
| Jun 1956 | The Long Arm | Ealing | Charles Frend | Michael Balcon | Jack Hawkins | police film |
| Jul 1956 | Reach for the Sky | Pinnacle Productions | Lewis Gilbert | Dan Angel | Kenneth More | WW2, biggest hit of year |
| Jun 1956 | Jacqueline | George H. Brown | Roy Ward Baker | George H. Brown | John Gregson | |
| Aug 1956 | Eyewitness | Rank | Muriel Box | Sydney Box | Donald Sinden, Belinda Lee | thriller |
| Oct 1956 | House of Secrets | Rank | Guy Green | Vivian Cox | Michael Craig | crime |
| Dec 1956 | Checkpoint | Rank | Ralph Thomas | Betty Box | Anthony Steel, Stanley Baker | Shot in Italy |
| Oct 1956 | The Battle of the River Plate | Archers (Arcturus Productions) | Powell & Pressberger | Powell & Pressberger | Peter Finch, John Gregson | WW2, one of biggest hits of 1957, Royal Command film |
| Dec 1956 | The Spanish Gardener | Rank | Philip Leacock | John Bryan | Dirk Bogarde | Shot in Spain, one of biggest hits of year |
| Nov 1956 | Tiger in the Smoke | Rank | Roy Ward Baker | Leslie Parkyn | Donald Sinden | |
| Dec 1956 | Up in the World | Rank | John Paddy Carstars | Hugh Stewart | Norman Windom | comedy |
| Dec 1956 | The Big Money | Rank | John Paddy Carstairs | Joseph Janni | Ian Carmichael, Belinda Lee | comedy, not given general release until 1958 |

=== 1957 ===
Film
| Year | Title | Company | Director | Producer | Star | Notes |
|---|---|---|---|---|---|---|
| 1957 | Ill Met by Moonlight | Archers | Powell & Pressberger | Powell & Pressberger | Dirk Bogarde | WW2, one of biggest hits of the year |
| 1957 | The Secret Place | Rank | Clive Donner | John Bryan | Belinda Lee, Ronald Lewis | crime |
| 1957 | True as a Turtle | Rank | Wendy Toye | Peter De Sarigny | John Gregson | comedy |
| 1957 | Doctor at Large | Rank | Ralph Thomas | Betty Box | Dirk Bogarde | Doctor #3, one of biggest hits of year |
| 1957 | High Tide at Noon | Rank | Philip Leacock | Julian Wintle | Betta St John | |
| 1957 | The Crooked Sky | Luckwin, Tudor | Henry Cass | Henry Cass | Wayne Morris | crime |
| 1957 | Miracle in Soho | Rank | Julian Aymes | Emeric Pressberger | Belinda Lee, John Gregon | |
| 1957 | Hell Drivers | Aqua/Rank | Cy Endfield | Benjamin Frisz | Stanley Baker | sea drama |
| 1957 | Manuela | Ivan Foxwell | Guy Hamilton | Ivan Foxwell | Trevor Howard | |
| 1957 | Across the Bridge | IFP | Ken Annakin | John Stafford | Rod Steiger | Based on Graham Greene story |
| 1957 | Seven Thunders | Dial | Hugo Fregonese | Daniel Angel | Stephen Boyd | |
| 1957 | Robbery Under Arms | Rank | Jack Lee | Joseph Janni | Peter Finch, Ronald Lewis | Shot in Australia |
| 1957 | Campbell's Kingdom | Rank | Ralph Thomas | Betty Box | Dirk Bogarde, Stanley Baker | Shot in Italy, set in Canada, one of biggest hits of year |
| 1957 | The One That Got Away | Rank | Roy Ward Baker | Julian Wintle | Hardy Kruger | WW2, one of biggest hits of the year |
| 1957 | Just My Luck | Rank | John Paddy Carstairs | Hugh Stewart | Norman Wisdom | comedy |
| 1957 | Dangerous Exile | Rank | Brian Desmond Hurst | George H Brown | Louis Jourdan, Belinda Lee | French revolution |
| 1957 | The Naked Truth | Rank | Mario Zampi | Mario Zampi | Terry Thomas | comedy |
| 1957 | Windom's Way | Rank | Ronald Neame | John Bryan | Peter Finch | Set in Malayan Emergency, shot in Corsica |

=== 1958 ===
| Year | Title | Company | Director | Producer | Star | Notes |
|---|---|---|---|---|---|---|
| Jan 1958 | Violent Playground | Rank | Basil Dearden | Michael Relph | Stanley Baker, David McCallum | Juvenile delinquent film |
| Jan 1958 | The Gypsy and the Gentleman | Rank | Joseph Losey | Maurice Cowan | Melina Mecouri, Keith Michell | |
| Feb 1958 | A Tale of Two Cities | Rank | Ralph Thomas | Betty E. Box | Dirk Bogarde | Based on novel by Charles Dickens |
| Feb 1958 | Carve Her Name with Pride | Keyboard Prductions | Lewis Gilbert | Daniel Angel | Virginia McKenna | Based on true story, one of top 12 hits of year |
| Mar 1958 | Rooney | Rank | George Pollock | George Brown | Barry Fitzgerald | comedy |
| March 1958 | Innocent Sinners | Rank | Philip Leacock | Hugh Stewart | Flora Robson | |
| April 1958 | Heart of a Child | Beaconsfield/Rank | Clive Donner | Alfred Shaughnessy | Jean Anderson | |
| Jul 1958 | A Night to Remember | Rank | Roy Ward Baker | William MacQuitty | Kenneth More | Based on the book of the same name by Walter Lord, which was based on the sinking of the Titanic, most expensive British film |
| Aug 1958 | Nor the Moon by Night | IFP | Ken Annakin | John Stafford | Michael Craig, Belinda Lee | Shot in South Africa |
| Aug 1958 | Sea Fury | Aqua/Rank | Cy Endfield | Benjamin Fisz | Stanley Baker | Shot in Spain |
| Jun 1958 | The Wind Cannot Read | Rank | Ralph Thomas | Betty Box | Dirk Bogarde | WW2 film, shot in India, one of biggest hits of year |
| Oct 1958 | Rockets Galore! | Rank | Michael Relph | Basil Dearden | Jeannie Carson | Sequel to Whiskey Galore |
| Sept 1958 | Passionate Summer | Harper-Willoughby | Rudolph Carter | Kenneth Harper, George Willoughby | Virginia McKenna, Bill Travers | |
| Nov 1958 | Sea of Sand | Tempean | Guy Green | Robert S. Baker, Monty Berman | Richard Attenborough, Michael Craig, John Gregson | War movie |
| Nov 1958 | Floods of Fear | Rank | Charles Crichton | Sydney Box | Howard Keel | |
| Dec 1958 | The Square Peg | Rank | John Paddy Carstairs | Hugh Stewart | Norman Wisdom | Comedy, one of the most popular films of 1969 |
| Dec 1958 | Bachelor of Hearts | Independent Artists | Wolf Rilla | Vivian Cox | Hardy Kruger | Comedy |

=== 1959 ===
Film
| Year | Title | Company | Director | Producer | Star | Notes |
|---|---|---|---|---|---|---|
| Jan 1959 | The Captain's Table | Rank | Jack Lee | Joseph Janni | John Gregson | Comedy |
| Jan 1959 | Operation Amsterdam | Rank | Michael McCarthy | Maurice Cowan | Peter Finch | War story, shot in Amsterdam |
| Feb 1959 | Hidden Homicide | Bill and Michael Luckwell Film Ltd | Anthony Young | Bill Luckwell, Derek Winn | Griffith Jones | |
| Mar 1959 | Too Many Crooks | Rank | Mario Zampi | Mario Zampi | Terry Thomas | Comedy |
| Mar 1959 | The 39 Steps | Rank | Ralph Thomas | Betty Box | Kenneth More | Remake of 1935 film, one of biggest hits of year |
| Mar 1959 | Tiger Bay | Independent Artists Productions | J. Lee Thompson | John Hawkesworth | John Mills, Hayley Mills | Thriller |
| Apr 1959 | Whirlpool | Rank | Lewis Allen | George Pitcher | Juliette Greco | |
| Apr 1959 | Sapphire | Artna | Basil Dearden | Michael Relph | Nigel Patrick | Race drama, one of biggest hits of year |
| Jul 1959 | The Heart of a Man | Wilcox-Neagle (Everest) | Herbert Wilcox | Anna Neagle | Frankie Vaughan | |
| Jul 1959 | Ferry to Hong Kong | Rank | Lewis Gilbert | George Maynard | Orson Welles, Curt Jurgens | Filmed in Hong Kong, box office disaster |
| Aug 1959 | Upstairs and Downstairs | Rank | Ralph Thomas | Betty Box | Michael Craig | Comedy |
| Aug 1959 | Blind Date | Independent Artists Ltd, Sydney Box Assoc | Joseph Losey | David Deutsch | Hardy Kruger, Stanley Baker | |
| Oct 1959 | The Night We Dropped a Clanger | Sydney Box Films, Four Star Assoc | Darcy Conyers | David Henley, Sydney Box | Brian Rix | comedy |
| Oct 1959 | North West Frontier | Rank | J. Lee Thompson | Marcel Hellman | Kenneth More, Lauren Bacall | Shot in India, one of biggest hits of year |
| Oct 1959 | SOS Pacific | Sydney Box Assoc, Remfield | Guy Green | John Nasht, Patrick Filmer-Sankey | Richard Attenborough | |
| Dec 1959 | Desert Mice | Artna Films; Welbeck Films | Basil Dearden | Alfred Marks | comedy | |
| Dec 1959 | Follow a Star | Rank | Robert Asher | Hugh Stewart | Norman Wisdom | |

== 1960s ==
=== 1960 ===
| Year | Title | Company | Director | Producer | Star | Notes |
|---|---|---|---|---|---|---|
| Mar 1960 | Too Young to Love | Welbeck | Muriel Box | Herbert Smith | Pauline Hahn | teen social realism |
| Jan 1960 | The Shakedown | Alliance Film | John Lemont | Norman Williams | Terence Morgan | |
| 1960 | The Royal Ballet | | Paul Czinner | Paul Czinner | Margot Fonteyn | Ballet film |
| Feb 1960 | Conspiracy of Hearts | Rank | Ralph Thomas | Betty Box | Lili Palmer, Sylvia Syms | World War Two, one of the most popular films of the year |
| Nov 1960 | Faces in the Dark | Welbeck | David Eady | Jon Penington | John Gregson, Mai Zetterling | |
| Mar 1960 | Your Money or Your Wife | Alliance Film | Anthony Simmons | Norman Williams | Donald Sinden | comedy |
| April 1960 | The League of Gentlemen | Allied Film Makers | Basil Dearden | Michael Relph | Jack Hawkins | Heist story, one of biggest hits of the year |
| Apr 1960 | Beyond the Curtain | Martin Films | Compton Bennett | John Martin | Richard Greene | |
| May 1960 | The Savage Innocents | Rank | Nicholas Ray | Maleno Malenotti | Anthony Quinn | Based on Top of the World |
| May 1960 | The Challenge | Alexandra | John Gilling | John Temple-smith | Jayne Mansfield, Anthony Quayle | |
| Jun 1960 | Never Let Go | Independent Artists | John Guillermin | Peter de Sarigny | Richard Todd, Peter Sellers | |
| Aug 1960 | Make Mine Mink | Rank | Robert Asher | Hugh Stewart | Terry Thomas | comedy |
| 1960 | Snowball | Independent Artists | Pat Jackson | Leslie Parkyn, Julian Wintle | Gordon Jackson | crime |
| Jul 1960 | Doctor in Love | Rank | Ralph Thomas | Betty Box | Michael Craig | Doctor series, biggest hit of 1960 |
| Sep 1960 | Piccadilly Third Stop | Ethiro-Alliance, Sydney Box Associates | Wolf Rilla | Norman Williams | Terence Morgan | |
| Oct 1960 | Man in the Moon | Allied Film Makers | Basil Dearden | Michael Relph | Kenneth More | Box office flop |
| Dec 1960 | The Bulldog Breed | Rank | Robert Asher | Hugh Stewart | Norman Wisdom | Comedy |

=== 1961 ===
| Year | Title | Company | Director | Producer | Star | Notes |
|---|---|---|---|---|---|---|
| Jan 1961 | The Singer Not the Song | Rank | Roy Ward Baker | Roy Baker, Jack Hanbury | Dirk Bogarde, John Mills | Shot in Spain |
| Feb 1961 | No Love for Johnnie | Five Star | Ralph Thomas | Betty Box | Peter Finch | Box office flop |
| Apr 1961 | Very Important Person | Independent Artists | Ken Annakin | | James Robertson Justice, Leslie Phillips | |
| Jun 1961 | Flame in the Streets | Rank/Somerset | Roy Baker | Roy Baker, Jack Hanbury | John Mills | Racial drama |
| Jul 1961 | Whistle Down the Wind | AFM/Beaver | Bryan Forbes | Richard Attenborough | Hayley Mills, Alan Bates | Box office hit |
| Aug 1961 | Information Received | United | Robert Lynn | | Sabine Sesselman | |
| Aug 1961 | No My Darling Daughter | Rank/Five Star | Ralph Thomas | Betty Box | Michael Redgrave, Michael Craig | |
| 1961 | Victim | AFM | Basil Dearden | Michael Relph | Dirk Bogarde | Gay themes |
| 1961 | Pit of Darkness | Rank | Lance Comfort | Lance Comfort | William Franklyn, Moira Redmond | Based on To Dusty Death |
| 1961 | In the Doghouse | Rank | Darcy Conyers | | Leslie Phillips | Comedy |

=== 1962 ===
| Year | Title | Company | Director | Producer | Star | Notes |
|---|---|---|---|---|---|---|
| Feb 1962 | All Night Long | Roberts Pictures | Basil Dearden | Michael Relph | Patrick McGoohan | Based on Othello |
| Mar 1962 | A Pair of Briefs | Rank | Ralph Thomas | Betty Box | Michael Craig | Comedy |
| May 1962 | The Traitors | Ello | Robert Tronson | Jim O'Connolly | Patrick Allen | spy |
| Jul 1962 | Tiara Tahiti | Ivan Foxwell | Ted Kotcheff | Ivan Foxwell | James Mason, John Mills | |
| Aug 1962 | Life for Ruth | Allied Film Makers/Saracen Films Ltd | Basil Dearden | Michael Relph | Michael Craig, Janet Munro, Patrick McGoohan | Commercial failure |
| Jul 1962 | The Day of the Triffids | Security | Stephen Sekely | George Pitcher | Howard Keel | based on novel by John Wyndham |
| 1962 | Der Rosenkavalier | | Paul Czinner | | Elisabeth Schwarzkopf | conductor: Herbert von Karajan |
| 1962 | Band of Thieves | Filmvale | | | | |
| Sep 1962 | Billy Budd | Anglo Allied | Peter Ustinov | Peter Ustinov | Peter Ustinov, Robert Ryan, Terence Stamp | Based on novel by Herman Melville |
| Oct 1962 | The Wild and the Willing | Rank | Ralph Thomas | Betty Box | Ian MacShane, John Hurt, Samantha Eagger | university drama |
| Dec 1962 | The Fur Collar | Albatross | Lawrence Huntington | Lawrence Huntington | John Bentley | thriller |
| Dec 1962 | The Fast Lady | Independent Artists | Ken Annakin | Julian Wintle | Stanley Baxter | Comedy; minor hit |
| Dec 1962 | On the Beat | Rank | Robert Asher | Hugh Stewart | Norman Wisdom | comedy |
| Apr 1962 | Waltz of the Toreadors | Independent Artists | John Guillermin | Peter De Sarigny | Peter Sellers | Minor hit |

=== 1963 ===
| Year | Title | Company | Director | Producer | Star | Notes |
|---|---|---|---|---|---|---|
| Feb 1963 | This Sporting Life | Independent Artists | Lindsay Anderson | Karel Reiz | Richard Harris | rugby league |
| Feb 1963 | Stranglehold | Argo | Lawrence Huntington | David Henley | MacDonald Carey | |
| Mar 1963 | The Bay of St Michel | Trionyx Films Limited | John Ainsworth | | Keenan Wynn | WW2 |
| Apr 1963 | Call Me Bwana | Eon | Gordon Douglas | Albert Broccoli | Bob Hope | comedy |
| Jul 1963 | Doctor in Distress | Rank | Ralph Thomas | Betty Box | Dirk Bogarde | Doctor film #5 |
| Aug 1963 | 80,000 Suspects | Rank | Val Guest | Val Guest | Claire Bloom | |
| Oct 1963 | Bitter Harvest | Independent Artists | Peter Graham Scott | Albert Fennell | Janet Munro | social realism |
| Nov 1963 | The Eyes of Annie Jones | Jack Parsons-Neil McCallum Productions | Reginald Le Borg | Jack Parsons | | |
| Nov 1963 | Live It Up | Three Kings Films Ltd | Lance Comfort | | David Hemmings | teen musical |
| Nov 1963 | The Informers | Rank | Ken Annakin | William MacQuitty | Nigel Patrick | |
| Dec 1963 | Farewell Performance | Sevenay Productions | Robert Tronson | | | |
| Dec 1963 | A Stitch in Time | Rank | Robert Asher | Hugh Stewart | Norman Wisdom | Comedy |

=== 1964 ===
| Year | Title | Company | Director | Producer | Star | Notes |
|---|---|---|---|---|---|---|
| Feb 1964 | Father Came Too! | Independent Artists | Peter Graham Scott | | James Robertson Justice, Leslie Phillips | |
| Feb 1964 | Hot Enough for June | Rank | Ralph Thomas | Betty Box | Dirk Bogarde | spy spoof |
| Jun 1964 | Seance on a Wet Afternoon | Allied Filmmakers; Beaver Films | Bryan Forbes | Bryan Forbes, Richard Attenborough | Kim Stanley, Richard Attenborough | Commercial failure |
| Jun 1964 | The Beauty Jungle | Rank | Val Guest | Val Guest | Ian Hendry | |

=== 1965 ===
| Year | Title | Company | Director | Producer | Star | Notes |
|---|---|---|---|---|---|---|
| 1965 | The Intelligence Men | | Robert Asher | | Morecambe and Wise | Spy spoof; one of 12 most popular films |
| Feb 1965 | The High Bright Sun | Rank | Ralph Thomas | Betty Box | Dirk Bogarde, Susan Strasberg | Set in Cyprus; ast Thomas-Box-Bogarde collaboration; commercial failure |
| 1965 | Be My Guest | | Lance Comfort | Lance Comfort | David Hemmings | |
| 1965 | The Ipcress File | Lowndes | Sidney Furie | Harry Saltzmann | Michael Caine | spy movie; led to 2 sequels |
| 1965 | The Heroes of Telemark | Benton | Anthony Mann | Benjamin Fisz | Kirk Douglas, Richard Harris | WW2 story; one of 15 most popular films of year |
| 1965 | Sky West and Crooked | John Mills | John Mills | Jack Hanbury | Hayley Mills, Ian McShane | |
| 1965 | The Early Bird | | Robert Asher | | Norman Wisdom | comedy; one of 15 most popular films of year |
| 1965 | Dateline Diamonds | | Jeremy Summers | | The Small Faces | teen pop musical |
| 1965 | Doctor in Clover | Rank | Ralph Thomas | Betty Box | Leslie Phillips, James Robertson Justice | Doctor #6; one of 15 most popular films of year |
| 1965 | I Was Happy Here | Partisan/Rank | Desmond Davis | | Sarah Miles | Based on story by Edna O'Brien; commercial failure |

=== 1966 ===
| Year | Title | Company | Director | Producer | Star | Notes |
|---|---|---|---|---|---|---|
| 1966 | That Riviera Touch | | Cliff Owen | Hugh Stewart | Morecambe & Wise | comedy; among top 15 films of 1966 |
| 1966 | The Sandwich Man | Titan | Robert Hartford-Davis | | Michael Bentine | |
| 1966 | They're a Weird Mob | Williamson-Powell | Michael Powell | Michael Powell | Walter Chiari, Chips Rafferty | Shot in Australia; massive hit in Aust, lost money |
| 1966 | The Trap | | Sidney Hayers | George Brown | Rita Tushingham, Oliver Reed | Shot in Canada |
| 1966 | Romeo and Juliet | | Paul Czinner | | Rudolph Nureyev, Margot Fonteyn | Film of ballet |
| 1966 | Press for Time | | Robert Asher | | Norman Wisdom | comedy |

=== 1967 ===
| Year | Title | Company | Director | Producer | Star | Notes |
|---|---|---|---|---|---|---|
| 1967 | The Quiller Memorandum | | Michael Anderson | Ivan Foxwell | George Segal, Alec Guinness, Max von Sydow, Senta Berger | Spy Thriller |
| 1967 | Deadlier Than the Male | | Ralph Thomas | Betty Box | Richard Johnson | Spy Thriller |
| 1967 | Don't Lose Your Head | | Gerald Thomas | Peter Rogers | Sid James, Kenneth Williams | Carry On #13 |
| 1967 | Maroc 7 | | Gerry O'Hara | Leslie Phillips | Gene Barry | Lost money |
| 1967 | The Magnificent Two | Rank | Cliff Owen | Hugh Stewart | Morecambe and Wise | Comedy |
| 1967 | Stranger in the House | Selmur | Pierre Rouve | | James Mason | |
| July 1967 | The Long Duel | Rank | Ken Annakin | | Yul Brynner, Trevor Howard | Imperial adventure |
| 1967 | The Trygon Factor | | Cyril Frankel | | Stewart Granger | |
| 1967 | Follow That Camel | Rank Film Distributord | Gerald Thomas | Peter Rogers | Phil Silvers | Carry On #14 |
| 1967 | Carry On Doctor | | Gerald Thomas | Peter Rogers | Frankie Howerd | Carry On #15, one of biggest hits of the year |
| 1967 | Hell Is Empty | | Bernard Knowles | | Martine Carol | |
| 1967 | Two Weeks in September | | | | Brigitte Bardot | French film |

=== 1968 ===
| Year | Title | Company | Director | Producer | Star | Notes |
|---|---|---|---|---|---|---|
| 1968 | Carry On Up the Khyber | | | | | Carry On series |
| 1968 | Nobody Runs Forever | Selmur | Ralph Thomas | Betty Box | Rod Taylor | Thriller based on "The High Commissioner" |
| 1968 | Subterfuge | | | | | |

=== 1969 ===
| Year | Title | Company | Director | Producer | Star | Notes |
|---|---|---|---|---|---|---|
| 1969 | Some Girls Do | Rank/Ashdown | Ralph Thomas | Betty Box | Richard Johnson | Second Bulldog Drummond film |
| 1969 | Ring of Bright Water ! | Palomar/Rank, ABC Pictures Corporation | Jack Couffer | Joseph Strick | Bill Travers, Virginia McKenna | Made a loss |
| 1969 | Carry On Camping | | Gerald Thomas | Peter Rogers | Sid James, Kenneth Williams | Carry On #17; biggest hit of 1969 |
| 1969 | The Royal Hunt of the Sun | Rank/National General | Irving Lerner | Robert Sisk | Christopher Plummer | based on stage show |
| 1969 | Carry On Again Doctor | | Gerald Thomas | Peter Rogers | Sid James, Kenneth Williams | Carry On #18 |
| 1969 | Twinky aka Lola | | Richard Donner | Clive Sharp | Susan George, Charles Bronson | |
| 1969 | Mister Jericho* | ITC Entertainment | Sidney Hayers | Julian Wintle | | TV movie released theatrically used mainly as a support feature |

== 1970s ==
=== 1970 ===
| Year | Title | Company | Director | Producer | Star | Notes |
|---|---|---|---|---|---|---|
| 1970 | Carry On Up the Jungle | Adder/Ethiro | Gerald Thomas | Peter Rogers | Frankie Howerd, Sid James | |
| 1970 | Doctor in Trouble | Welback/Rank | Ralph Thomas | Betty Box | Leslie Phillips | |
| 1970 | Carry On Loving | Adder/GT | Gerald Thomas | Peter Rogers | Sid James, Kenneth Williams | |
| 1970 | Toomorrow | Lowndes/Sweet Music | Val Guest | Harry Saltzmann, Don Kirschner | Olivia Newton-John | |
| 1970 | Countess Dracula | Hammer | Peter Sasdy | Alexander Paal | Ingrid Pitt | |
| 1970 | Carry On Henry | Adder | Gerald Thomas | Peter Rogers | Sid James, Kenneth Williams | |
| 1970 | The Firechasers* | ITC Entertainment | Sidney Hayers | Julian Wintle | | TV Movie released in cinemas as a support feature |
| 1970 | The World at Their Feet# | | | | | documentary |

=== 1971-72 ===
| Year | Title | Company | Director | Producer | Star | Notes |
|---|---|---|---|---|---|---|
| 1971 | When Eight Bells Toll | Winkast, Gershwin-Kastner Productions | Etienne Perier | Elliott Kastner, Jerry Gershwin | Anthony Hopkins, Robert Morley, Jack Hawkins, Nathalie Delon, Corin Redgrave, Derek Bond | Spy Thriller adapted from Alistair MacLean novel |
| 1971 | Assault | Peter Rogers | Sidney Hayers | George Brown | Suzy Kendall | thriller |
| 1971 | Carry On at Your Convenience | Peter Rogers | Gerald Thomas | Peter Rogers | Sid James, Kenneth Williams | Carry On #22 |
| 1971 | Hands of the Ripper | Hammer | Peter Sasdy | Aida Young | Eric Porter | horror |
| 1971 | Quest for Love | Peter Rogers | Ralph Thomas | Peter Eton | Tom Bell | sci fi |
| 1971 | Revenge | Peter Rogers | Sidney Hayers | George Brown | Joan Collins | thriller |
| 1971 | Twins of Evil | Hammer | John Hough | Harry Fine, Michael Style | Peter Cushing | vampire story |
| 1972 | All Coppers Are... | | Sidney Hayers | George Brown | | |
| 1972 | Carry On Abroad | | Gerald Thomas | | | Carry On #24 |
| 1972 | Carry On Matron | | | | | Carry On #23 |
| 1971 | Kidnapped | | Delbert Mann | | Michael Caine | Based on classic novel |
| 1972 | Please Sir! | | | | John Alderton | Based on TV Series |
| 1972 | Rentadick | | | | | |
| 1972 | Vampire Circus | Hammer | | | Adrienne Corri | vampires |

=== 1973-74 ===
| Year | Title | Company | Director | Producer | Star | Notes |
|---|---|---|---|---|---|---|
| 1973 | Bless This House | Peter Rogers | Gerald Thomas | Peter Rogers | Sid James | Based on TV show |
| 1973 | The Belstone Fox | Rank | James Hill | | Eric Porter, Dennis Waterman | Based on book by David Rook, fully financed by Rank |
| 1973 | Carry On Girls | | Gerald Thomas | Peter Rogers | Sid James, Barbara Windsor | Carry On #25, fully financed by Rank |
| 1973 | Father Dear Father | | William Stewart | | Patrick Cargill | Based on TV series filmed at Elstree |
| 1973 | Nothing But the Night | | Peter Sasdy | | Christopher Lee, Peter Cushing | horror anthology |
| 1972 | Antony and Cleopatra | | Charlton Heston | Peter Snell | Charlton Heston | Based on play by Shakespeare |
| 1973 | That's Your Funeral | Hammer | | | Bill Fraser | Based on TV series |
| 1973 | Go for a Take | | Harry Booth | Roy Simpson | Reg Varney | |
| 1974 | Carry On Dick | | Gerald Thomas | Peter Rogers | Sid James, Barbara Windsor | Carry On #26 |
| 1974 | Don't Just Lie There, Say Something | Comocroft | Bob Kellet | | | Based on play, fully financed by Rank |
| 1974 | Caravan to Vaccares | Geoffrey Reeve Productions Ltd, Societe Nouvelle Prodis S.A, Crowndale Holdings | Geoffrey Reeve | Geoffrey Reeve, Richard Morris-Adams, John McNab, George Davis | Charlotte Rampling, David Birney, Michael Lonsdale, Michael Bryant, Marcel Bozzuffi, Serge Marquand | Partly financed by Rank, Action Thriller, Adaption of Alistair MacLean novel, co-production with France |
| 1974 | Brief Encounter* | ITC Entertainment, Transcontinental Film Productions (London), | Alan Bridges | Carlo Ponti, Cecil Clarke | Richard Burton, Sophia Loren | TV Movie, Remake of the 1946 classic, UK theatrical release cancelled, UK Premiere on TV 4 January 1976 |
| 1974 | Soft Beds, Hard Battles | Charter Film | Roy Boulting | Boulting Brothers | Peter Sellers | Commercial flop, part financed by Rank |

=== 1975-77 ===
| Year | Title | Company | Director | Producer | Star | Notes |
|---|---|---|---|---|---|---|
| 1975 | I Don't Want to Be Born | Rank. Unicapital | Peter Sasdy | Nato De Angeles | Joan Collins | Horror |
| 1975 | Russian Roulette* | ITC Entertainment, Bulldog Productions | Lou Lombardo | Jerry Bick, Elliott Kastner | George Segal, Christina Raines, Denholm Elliot Gordon Jackson | UK theatrical distribution only, Thriller co-production with Canada |
| 1975 | Carry On Behind | | Gerald Thomas | Peter Rogers | Elke Sommer | Carry On #27 |
| 1975 | The "Human" Factor | Eton/Avianca Features | Edward Dmytryk | Frank Avianca | George Kennedy, John Mills, Raf Vallone | suspense-thriller; UK theatrical distribution only |
| 1975 | That Lucky Touch | | Christopher Miles | | Roger Moore, Susannah York | |
| 1975 | Man Friday* | ITC Entertainment, ABC, Keep Films | Jack Gold | Jules Buck, Gerald Green, David Korda | Peter O'Toole, Richard Roundtree, Peter Cellier | Adventure Drama, adaption of a TV play, filmed in Mexico, UK theatrical distribution only |
| 1975 | Farewell, My Lovely* | ITC Entertainment, EK Productions | Dick Richards | Jerry Bruckheimer, George Pappas, Elliott Kastner | Robert Mitchum, Charlotte Rampling, John Ireland Sylvia Miles | Detective Thriller adapted from the Raymond Chandler novel, Remake of the original 1944 film version filmed as Murder My Sweet, UK theatrical distribution only |
| 1976 | Bugsy Malone | Goodtimes, RSO | Alan Parker | Alan Marshall | Scott Baio | gangster musical; minor hit |
| 1976 | Carry On England | | Gerald Thomas | Peter Rogers | Kenneth Connor | Carry On #28 |
| 1976 | Voyage of the Damned* | ITC Entertainment, Transcontinental Film Productions (London), Associated General Films | Stuart Rosenberg | Robert Fryer, William Hill | Faye Dunaway, Max von Sydow, Oskar Werner, Malcolm McDowell, Orson Welles, James Mason, Lee Grant, Katharine Ross | Historical Drama Based on a True Story UK theatrical distribution only |
| 1977 | Wombling Free | | Lionel Jeffries | | The Wombles | Based on TV series |
| 1977 | That's Carry On | | Gerald Thomas | Peter Rogers | Kenneth Williams | Carry On #29, compilation |

=== 1978 ===
| Year | Title | Company | Director | Producer | Star | Notes |
|---|---|---|---|---|---|---|
| 1978 | To See Such Fun | | | | | Documentary, Premiered on TV Christmas Day 1977 did not get a cinema release officially |
| 1978 | Blood Relatives | Classic Film Industries, Cinevideo, Filmel, Montreal Trust Company of Canada | Claude Chabrol | Denis Heroux, Eugene Lepicier, Michael Klinger, Julian Melzack | Donald Sutherland, Donald Pleasence, David Hemmings | Co-production with France and Canada |
| 1978 | Age of Innocence | | | | | |
| 1978 | The Uncanny | Rank, Cinevideo | Denis Heroux | | Peter Cushing | horror anthology |
| 1978 | Soldier of Orange | | Paul Verhoeven | | Rutger Hauer | Co production with Holland |
| 1978 | Power Play | | Martyn Burke | | Peter O'Toole | Co production with Canada |
| 1978 | The Shout | Recorded Picture | Jerzy Skolimowski | Jeremy Thomas | | Won Grand Prix at 1978 Cannes Film Festival |
| 1978 | The Thirty Nine Steps | Norfolk | Don Sharp | Greg Smith | Robert Powell | Based on John Buchan novel |
| 1978 | Tomorrow Never Comes | Classic, Neffbourne, Montreal Trust Company of Canada, Cinevideo | Peter Collinson | Michael Klinger, Julian Melzack, Denis Heroux | Oliver Reed, Susan George | Shot in Canada |
| 1978 | The Wild Geese | Richmond Film Productions | Andrew McLaglen | Euan Lloyd | Richard Burton, Roger Moore, Richard Harris, Hardy Kruger | Shot in South Africa |
| 1978 | Carry On Emmannuelle | Cleve Investments, Hemdale | Gerald Thomas | Peter Rogers | Kenneth Connor | Carry On #30 |

=== 1979 ===
| Year | Title | Company | Director | Producer | Star | Notes |
|---|---|---|---|---|---|---|
| 1979 | The Human Factor | Sigma, Wheel | Otto Preminger | | Nicol Williamson | Based on novel by Graham Greene, co-pro with UA |
| 1979 | The Riddle of the Sands | Worldmark | Tony Maylarn | Drummond Challis | Michael York | based on novel by Erskine Childers, not financial success |
| 1979 | Tarka the Otter | | David Cobham | David Cobham | | Based on book by Henry Williamson |
| 1979 | The Lady Vanishes | Hammer | Anthony Page | Tom Sachs | Elliott Gould, Cybill Shepherd | Remake of 1938 film, Last film from Hammer for 29 years |
| 1979 | Eagle's Wing | | Tony Harvey | Ben Arbeid | Martin Sheen | Western, shot in Mexico |

== 1980s ==
| Year | Title | Company | Director | Producer | Star | Notes |
|---|---|---|---|---|---|---|
| 1980 | Bad Timing | Recorded Picture Company | Nic Roeg | Jeremy Thomas | Art Garfunkel | |
| 1980 | Silver Dream Racer | Rank | David Wickes | David Wickes | David Essex | motorbike film |
| 1980 | The Sea Wolves | Lorimar, Richmond Light Horse | Andrew McLaglen | Euan Lloyd | Gregory Peck, Roger Moore | WW2 action |
| 1982 | The Boys in Blue | | Val Guest | Brian Fox | Tommy Cannon | Comedy |
| 1982 | Nutcracker | Jershaw | Anwar Kawandi | | Joan Collins | |
| 1982 | Who Dares Wins | Richmond Light Horse | Ian Sharp | Euan Lloyd | Lewis Collins | action |
| 1983 | Educating Rita | Acorn | Lewis Gilbert | Lewis Gilbert | Michael Caine, Julie Walters | based on Willy Russell play |
| 1983 | Heat and Dust | Merchant Ivory | James Ivory | Ismail Merchant | Julie Christie | Shot in India |
| 1984 | The Bostonians | Merchant Ivory | James Ivory | Ismail Merchant | Christopher Reeve | based on novel by Henry James |
| 1984 | Not Quite Jerusalem | | Lewis Gilbert | Lewis Gilbert | Sam Robards | |
| 1984 | The Chain | | Jack Gold | | Warren Mitchell | |
| 1984 | Secret Places | | Zelda Barron | | | |
| 1985 | Defence of the Realm | | David Drury | | Gabriel Byrne | Political thriller |
| 1985 | The Girl in the Picture | | Cary Parker | | | |
| 1987 | The Fourth Protocol | | John MacKenzie | | Michael Caine | based on novel by Frederick Forsyth |
| 1988 | Switching Channels | Switching Channels Inc, Tristar Pictures | Ted Kotcheff | Martin Ransohoff | Kathleen Turner, Burt Reynolds, Christopher Reeve | |
| 1988 | Hawks | Producer Representatives Organisation, Hoyts Entertainment | Robert Ellis Miller | Steve Lanning, Keith Cavele | Timothy Dalton, Anthony Edwards, Geoffrey Palmer | Comedy Drama co-production with Australia |
| 1989 | Gleaming the Cube | Gladden Entertainment, David Foster-Lawrence Turman Productions | Graeme Clifford | Bruce McNall, David Foster Lawrence Turman | Christian Slater, Steven Bauer, Richard Herd, Ed Lauter | Released by 20th Century Fox in the US |
| 1989 | Scenes from the Class Struggle in Beverly Hills | North Street Films | Paul Bartel | | Jacqueline Bissett | comedy |
| 1989 | Dealers | Euston Films | Colin Bucksey | William P. Cartlidge | Paul McGann, Rebecca De Mornay | |
| 1989 | Welcome Home | Martin Ransohoff Productions Colombia Pictures | Franklin Schaffner | Don Carmody, Martin Ransohoff | Kris Kristofferson, JoBeth Williams, Sam Waterston, Brian Keith | |
| 1989 | Weekend at Bernie's | Gladden Entertainment | Ted Kotcheff | Victor Drai | Andrew McCarthy, Jonathan Silverman, Catherine Mary Stewart, Terry Kiser | Distributed by 20th Century Fox in US |
| 1989 | Millennium | Gladden Entertainment | Michael Anderson | Douglas Leiterman, Bruce McNall | Kris Kristofferson, Cheryl Ladd, Daniel J Travanti | Science Fiction Disaster movie |

== 1990s ==
| Year | Title | Company | Director | Producer | Star | Notes |
|---|---|---|---|---|---|---|
| 1990 | All Dogs Go to Heaven | Goldcrest, Sullivan/Bluth Studios Ireland Limited | Don Bluth | Don Bluth, Gary Goldman, John Pomeroy | Burt Reynolds, Dom DeLuise, Loni Anderson | Co-Production with Ireland, France and US distributed by MGM/UA in US |
| 1991 | Under Suspicion | Carnival Films and London Weekend Television | Simon Moore | Brian Eastman | Liam Neeson, Laura San Giacomo | |
| 1991 | Fried Green Tomatoes | Avnet/Kerner Productions, Electric Shadow Productions and Act III Communications | Jon Avnet | Fannie Flagg, Carol Sobieski | Kathy Bates, Jessica Tandy | |
| 1991 | Rock-a-Doodle | Goldcrest Films and Sullivan Bluth Studios Ireland Limited | Don Bluth | Don Bluth, Gary Goldman, John Pomeroy | | Based on Chantecler |
| 1992 | Freddie as F.R.O.7 | Hollywood Road Films and J&M Entertainment | Jon Acevski | Jon Acevski and Norman Priggen | | |
| 1992 | Just Like a Woman | Zenith Entertainment | Christopher Monger | Nicholas Evans | Julie Walters, Adrian Pasdar, Paul Freeman | Based on the novel Geraldine, For the Love of a Transvestite by Monica Jay |
| 1994 | Four Weddings and a Funeral | PolyGram Filmed Entertainment, Channel Four Films and Working Title Films | Mike Newell | Duncan Kenworthy | Hugh Grant, Andie MacDowell | |
| 1994 | Royce* | ITC Entertainment, Showtime, David Gerber Productions | Rod Holcomb | David Gerber, J Boyce Harnam Jnr, Paul Bernbaum | Jim Belushi, Peter Boyle, Chelsea Field, Anthony Head | Spy Thriller TV Movie made for US cable Theatrical Release in the UK |
| 1996 | The Stupids | Savoy Pictures | John Landis | Leslie Belzberg | Tom Arnold | Based on book by James Marshall and Harry Allard |
| 1997 | 8 Heads in a Duffel Bag | | Tom Schulman | Jeffrey D. Ivers, Brad Krevoy, Steve Stabler | Joe Pesci | |
| 1997 | Lawn Dogs | | John Duigan | Duncan Kenworthy | | |

- owned by ITV as part of the ITC Entertainment library though were distributed by Rank for UK cinema in the original years of release they are not sold and distributed by ITV under the Rank Collection.
1. now owned and distributed by FIFA Films

! owned by Fremantle Media/MGM/Disney as part of the ABC Motion Picture library

== Notes ==
- Falk, Quentin (1987). The golden gong : fifty years of the Rank Organisation, its films and its stars. Columbus Books.
