= Group Film Productions =

British film production company (1953–1967)

Group Film Productions was a British film production company that made movies through the Rank Organisation. It was wholly owned by Rank, and followed a similar company, British Film-Makers, which had made fourteen titles. It would be followed in turn by Rank Organisation Film Productions, which made 96 films between 1953 and 1967.

== Background ==
In January 1951, Rank formed British Film Makers (BFM) in association with the National Film Finance Corporation. Various producer director teams made movies for it. Rank's distribution arm, GFD, would distribute and guarantee 70% of finance, with the NFFC to provide the balance. Rank pulled out of the scheme in late 1952 saying it no longer wished to rely on the NFFC.

Group Film Productions would be Rank's main film production company. The studio also co financed with independent producers. According to academics Sue Harper and Vincent Porter:

Although some Rank films were produced independently, in practice the only difference between them and in-house productions appears to be that independent producers had more control over the choice of art director or director of photography. In [John] Davis’s view, there were extremely few ‘independent producers’, as they neither provided their own production finance, nor accepted the financial risks involved.' He therefore established an elaborate system of financial and organizational controls which shaped and limited the production of all Rank films.

== Productions ==
The first official Group Film Production was The Kidnappers (1953) which was a commercial success and a personal favourite of J. Arthur Rank. Most of its movies were comedies, such as The Million Pound Note (1954) starring Gregory Peck, You Know What Sailors Are (1954), Doctor in the House (1954), Fast and Loose (1954), Up to His Neck (1954), and Mad About Men (1954). The blockbuster success of these was Doctor in the House which became the most successful movie in Rank's history and turned Dirk Bogarde and Kenneth More into film stars. In October 1954 Rank reported that the film production arm showed a profit, albeit due to the Eady Levy. Rank's goal was to make fifteen films a year and help finance six Ealing films.

Group Film Productions expanded into other genres – romance (The Young Lovers, 1954), colonial war dramas (Simba, 1955), musicals (As Long as They're Happy, 1955), and relationship dramas (Passage Home, The Woman for Joe, 1955). However its main genre remained comedies: Doctor at Sea (1955), Value for Money, Simon and Laura, Man of the Moment and All for Mary (all 1955). The most popular of these were comfortably Doctor and Sea and Man of the Moment.

Filmink argued the "biggest issues" of Group films were "miscast stars and poor plotting" although "The technical quality of the films was consistently high – the sets, the gorgeous colour, the photography. The acting of the support parts was usually solid."

In October 1955 Rank reported that £1,000,000 had been spent on the Group Film Production scheme for the previous year.

In 1955 the company was re-named Rank Organisation Film Productions.

== Select credits ==
- A Day to Remember (Nov 1953)
- The Little Kidnappers (Dec 1953)
- The Million Pound Note (Jan 1954)
- You Know What Sailors Are (Feb 1954)
- Fast and Loose (Feb 1954)
- Doctor in the House (March 1954)
- The Seekers (Jun 1954)
- Up to His Neck (Aug 1954)
- The Young Lovers (Aug 1954) aka Chance Meeting
- Mad About Men (Nov 1954)
- Simba (Jan 1955)
- As Long as They're Happy (Mar 1955)
- Passage Home (Apr 1955)
- Doctor at Sea (Jul 1955)
- Value for Money (Aug 1955)
- The Woman for Joe (Aug 1955)
- Simon and Laura (Nov 1955)
- Man of the Moment (Nov 1955)
- All for Mary (Dec 1955)
- An Alligator Named Daisy (Dec 1955)

== Notes ==
- Harper, Sue; Porter, Vincent (2003). British cinema of the 1950s : the decline of deference. Oxford University Press.
