= Joseph Tomelty =

Irish actor, playwright and novelist (1911–1995)

- Born: 5 March 1911; Portaferry, County Down, Ireland
- Died: 7 June 1995 (aged 84); Belfast, Northern Ireland
- Occupations: Actor; playwright; novelist; manager; short-story writer
- Years active: 1947–1964
- Spouse: Lena Milligan (m. 1942)
- Children: 2, including Frances Tomelty
- Family: Joe Sumner (grandson)

Joseph “Joe” Tomelty (5 March 1911 – 7 June 1995) was an Irish actor, playwright, novelist, short-story writer and theatre manager. He worked in film, television, radio and on the stage, starring in Sam Thompson's 1960 play Over the Bridge.

== Life and career ==
Born in Portaferry in 1911, he was the son of James Tomelty, a skilled fiddler who was nicknamed "Rollicking"; and the brother of Peter Tomelty, a tenor and recording artist. Tomelty's exposure to music at a young age influenced his work as a playwright, with several of his stage works being named after songs, including The Singing Bird (1948), Down the Heather Glen (1953) and The Drunken Sailor (1954).

Tomelty was a co-founder, in 1940, of the Group Theatre in Belfast, and served as its general manager until 1951.

He married Lena Milligan in 1942. They had two daughters together: Frances Tomelty is an actress and the first wife of singer and musician Sting; while Roma Tomelty (d. 22 April 2020) was also an actress.

== Works ==
=== Plays ===
- Barnum Was Right (1939)
- Idolatry at Inishargie (1942)
- Poor Errand (1943)
- Right Again Barnum (1943)
- The End House (1944)
- All Souls' Night (1948)
- The Singing Bird (1948)
- Down the Heather Glen (1953)
- April in Assagh (1954)
- The Drunken Sailor (1954)
- Is the Priest at Home? (1954)
- A Year in Marlfield (1965)

=== Novels ===
- Red Is the Port Light (1948)
- The Apprentice (1953)

=== Radio ===
- Barnum Is Right (1938)
- Elopement (1939)
- The McCooeys (1948)

=== Complete filmography ===
- Odd Man Out (1947) - 'Gin' Jimmy, the cabbie
- Shark Island (1951) - Seán
- Treasure Hunt (1952) - Poacher
- The Sound Barrier (1952) - Will Sparks
- You're Only Young Twice (1952) - Dan McEntee
- The Gentle Gunman (1952) - Dr Brannigan
- The Gentle Maiden (1953 TV movie) - John Clarke
- The Oracle (1953) - Terry Roche
- Melba (1953) - Thomas Mitchell
- Meet Mr Lucifer (1953) - Mr. Pedelty
- Hell Below Zero (1954) - Capt. McPhee
- Front Page Story (1954) - Dan
- Hobson's Choice (1954) - Jim Heeler
- Devil Girl from Mars (1954) - Prof. Arnold Hennessey
- Happy Ever After (1954) - Dooley
- The Young Lovers (1954) - Moffatt
- Simba (1955) - Dr. Hughes
- Bedevilled (1955) - Father Cunningham
- A Kid for Two Farthings (1955) - Vagrant
- John and Julie (1955) - Mr. Davidson
- Timeslip (1955) - Detective Inspector Cleary
- A Prize of Gold (1955) - Uncle Dan
- Moby Dick (1956) - Peter Coffin (voice dubbed by John Huston)
- A Night to Remember (1958) - Dr. William O'Loughlin
- Tread Softly Stranger (1958) - Joe Ryan
- The Captain's Table (1959) - Dalrymple
- Upstairs and Downstairs (1959) - Arthur Farringdon
- Next to No Wife (1959 TV movie) - Canon Fergus Brodie
- Life Is a Circus (1960) - Joe Winter
- Hell Is a City (1960) - Furnisher Steele
- The Day They Robbed the Bank of England (1960) - Cohoun
- Lancelot and Guinevere (1963) - Sir Kaye
- The Black Torment (1964) - Sir Giles Fordyke

== The McCooeys ==
Tomelty's family-based radio sitcom The McCooeys was first broadcast on the BBC Home Service in Northern Ireland on 13 May 1949, becoming the region's most listened-to programme over the next six years. Centre Stage Theatre Company, co-founded by his daughter Roma and her husband Colin Carnegie, revived four of the episodes in a stage version, directed by Michael Quinn and performed in the refurbished Grand Opera House Studio Theatre in February 2022.
