= Philip Stainton =

British actor (1908–1961)

- Publicity still for The Ladykillers (1955)
- Born: 9 April 1908; King's Norton, Worcestershire, England
- Died: 1 August 1961 (aged 53); Melbourne, Victoria, Australia
- Occupation: Actor
- Years active: 1947–1961

Philip Stainton (9 April 1908 – 1 August 1961) was an English actor. Stainton appeared in several Ealing comedies and major international movies. He specialised in playing friendly or exasperated uniformed policemen, but also appeared in other comic and straight roles in British and Australian productions.

After beginning in repertory, in the postwar years he worked steadily in bit and featured parts in theatrical films; twice being directed by John Ford and once by John Huston when they shot on European or overseas locations. He first visited Australia as part of a touring company presenting Agatha Christie’s play Witness for the Prosecution.

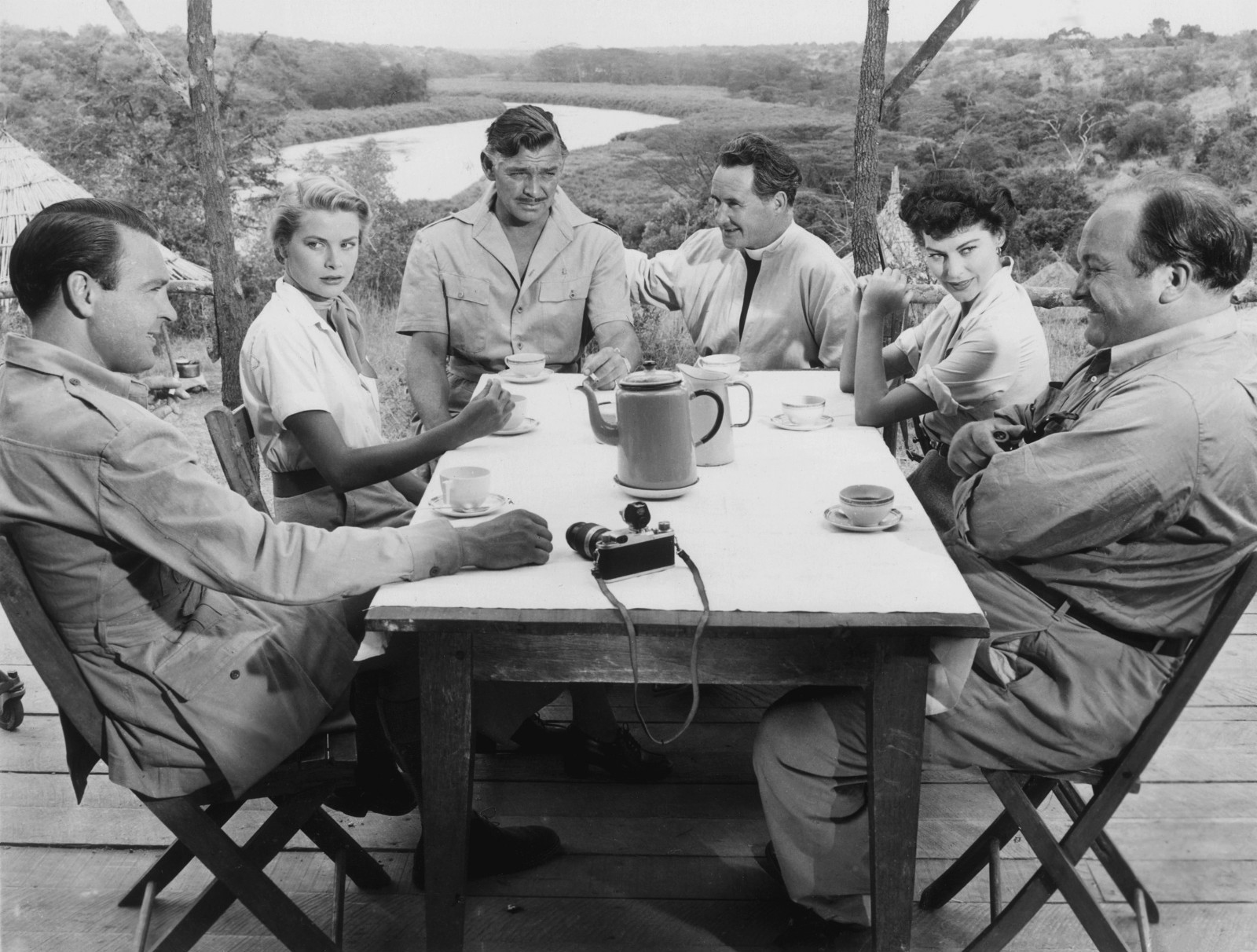
Mogambo (dir: John Ford 1953) cast with (L-R) Donald Sinden, Grace Kelly, Clark Gable, Denis O'Dea, Ava Gardner and Stainton

Stainton and his actress wife immigrated to Australia in the late 1950s to appear in a series of live television plays as the medium was beginning in that country. From 1957 to 1959 he had the distinction to headline the first Australian sitcom Take That which was broadcast in Melbourne by HSV-7.

He also adapted and produced a version of the gaslight melodrama East Lynne which became a hit around the circuit of surviving music hall venues in the early 1960s and was subsequently revived. During a centenary performance at impresario George Miller's Bowl Music Hall (basement of The Capitol, Melbourne), he succumbed to a heart attack on 1 August 1961.

== Filmography ==
- Eyes That Kill (1947)
- Night Beat (1947) - Sgt. Black (uncredited)
- Scott of the Antarctic (1948) - Second Questioner
- The Blue Lagoon (1949) - Mr. Ansty
- Passport to Pimlico (1949) - P.C.Spiller
- Poet's Pub (1949) - Mr. Lott (uncredited)
- Don't Ever Leave Me (1949) - Detective Inspector
- Trottie True (1949) - Arthur Briggs (uncredited)
- The Spider and the Fly (1949) - Café Manager
- Boys in Brown (1949) - Principal Prison Officer
- The Elusive Pimpernel (1950) - Jellyband
- White Corridors (1951) - Sawyer
- Appointment with Venus (1951) - Constable
- Angels One Five (1952) - Police Constable
- The Quiet Man (1952) - Anglican Bishop (uncredited)
- Made in Heaven (1952) - Stanley Grimes
- Monsoon (1952) - Putsi
- Innocents in Paris (1953) - Nobby Clarke
- Mogambo (1953) - John Brown-Pryce
- Hobson's Choice (1954) - Denton
- Forbidden Cargo (1954) - Seaburyness Police Sergeant (uncredited)
- Isn't Life Wonderful! (1953) - Dr. Mason
- Up to His Neck (1954) - Mr. Woo
- John and Julie (1955) - London Police Sergeant
- The Woman for Joe (1955) - Sullivan
- Cast a Dark Shadow (1955) - Charlie Man
- The Ladykillers (1955) - The Sergeant
- Who Done It? (1956) - Jimmy Maddox, Frankie's Agent
- Moby Dick (1956) - Bildad
- Reach for the Sky (1956) - Police Constable
