= Simba (1955 film) =

British drama film

- Original film poster
- Directed by: Brian Desmond Hurst
- Written by: John Baines; Robin Estridge; Anthony Perry (story)
- Produced by: Peter De Sarigny
- Starring: Dirk Bogarde; Virginia McKenna; Donald Sinden
- Cinematography: Geoffrey Unsworth
- Edited by: Michael Gordon
- Music by: Francis Chagrin
- Production company: Rank Organisation
- Distributed by: General Film Distributors (UK); Lippert (US)
- Release date: 19 January 1955
- Running time: 95 minutes
- Country: United Kingdom
- Language: English

Simba is a 1955 British war drama film directed by Brian Desmond Hurst, and starring Dirk Bogarde, Donald Sinden, Virginia McKenna, and Basil Sydney. The screenplay concerns a British family living in East Africa, who become embroiled in the Mau Mau Uprising.

== Plot ==
Alan Howard is returning to his family's farm in Kenya in order to become a farmer. After reuniting with the nurse Mary Crawford, he discovers that his brother David has been murdered by the Mau Mau. The rebels have daubed the word "Simba" (Lion) in his brother's house. Alan also reunites with Mary's parents who disagree on the ideology of the rebellion and the nature of the native Africans.

The next day, Alan meets with Colonel Bridgeman who is in charge of a local police militia. While questioning rebel suspects, one of them flees, and is shot while trying to escape. He is confirmed Mau Mau from his fresh initiation scars. Alan also meet up with Dr Karanja who runs the local dispensary where Mary works. Alan and Mary later join a town meeting for white farmers. Although it is clear that many natives have been forced to join the Mau Mau because they fear them, the farmers cannot agree on what needs to be done. Alan's prejudice against the natives becomes stronger. That night, another rebel takes the Mau Mau-oath in full display of the local tribe. Another native refuses the ritual, and is put to death.

Dr Karanja later advices Alan to leave Kenya, but he refuses, believing the doctor to be in league with the rebels. Many warnings are given to Alan by the Mau Mau, but he chooses to stay, even after he is attacked by a rebel in his own house. The attacker is shot by Mary's father, and later dies in the hospital, uttering only the name "Simba". Dr Karanja angrily confronts Alan's suspicions of him by showing him his lack of initiation scars, and Alan concedes his sincerity.

Alan and Mary rekindle their relationship. Their harmony is broken when the rebels attack the home of Mary's parents and murder her father. After witnessing the violence, Dr Karanja confesses that his father is "Simba", the leader of the local rebels. The police hunt down Simba, but he manages to escape. The next day, all of the workers on Alan's farm have fled in fear. A rebel close to Simba informs Colonel Bridgewater that Simba is in Manoa, and the police make their way to Alan's farm, believing it will be attacked. Dr Karanja and Mary are also informed by Alan's runaway houseboy that Simba is going to attack Alan's farm, and make their way to it. That night, Alan, Mary and Dr Karanja are held up on the farm, while it is overrun by the Mau Mau. Dr Karanja tries to peacefully confront his father. Simba attacks him, but is shot down by Alan. The rebels then cut down Dr Karanja before the police arrive.

== Cast ==
- Dirk Bogarde as Alan Howard
- Donald Sinden as Inspector Drummond
- Virginia McKenna as Mary Crawford
- Basil Sydney as Mr Crawford
- Marie Ney as Mrs Crawford
- Joseph Tomelty as Doctor Hughes
- Earl Cameron as Karanja
- Orlando Martins as Headman
- Ben Johnson as Kimani
- Frank Singuineau as Waweru
- Huntley Campbell as Joshua
- Slim Harris as Chege
- Glyn Lawson as Mundati
- Harry Quashie as Thakla
- John Chandos as Settler
- Desmond Roberts as Colonel Bridgeman
- Errol John as African Inspector

== Production ==
=== Development ===
The box-office success of The Planter's Wife (1952) saw Rank become interested in making films about other contemporary Imperial stories and head of production Earl St. John put out a call for story submissions to do with the Mau Mau Uprising. Anthony Perry obliged with a treatment and he was sent to Kenya, where his advisers included Charles Njonjo. The treatment had to be approved by the War Office, the Colonial Office, and the white settler organisation, the Voice of Kenya. The script was written by another writer, John Baines and the project was assigned to producer Peter De Sarigny and director Brian Desmond Hurst.

Desmond Hurst said, "We have to be most scrupulous with a subject like this Every care must be taken to give both the European and African view to the whole situation."

=== Shooting ===
The film was shot at Pinewood Studios, with second unit photography in Kenya. The producers had originally hoped to cast Jack Hawkins in the lead and used a double in Kenya to match him in long shot. When Hawkins was unavailable, Bogarde was cast instead and much of the Kenyan footage covering Hawkins could not be used. However, they had also used a tall, blond Rhodesian policeman as the long shot stand-in for the part of Inspector Drummond, but had difficulty finding an available blond actor in England to play the part and so match up the shots. A chance meeting in the bar at Pinewood between the director Brian Desmond Hurst and Donald Sinden, who had had to dye his hair blond for the comedy film Mad About Men, led to Sinden being cast as Drummond.

Several of the Mau Mau were played by real Mau Mau rebels under death sentence; they were executed three days after filming.

Earl Cameron later recalled:

Brian Desmond Hurst was a very touchy man. When he directed me in Simba... He overheard me tell the actor Sydney Tafler that I thought Simba was ‘fair’. His face turned red and he looked at me and said something I would not accept from anybody. He called me a ‘bloody nigger’. Sydney looked at me as if to say ‘forget it’. He could see me getting angry. So I just walked away. I said nothing. It wasn’t a very happy film. Brian Desmond Hurst and Dirk Bogarde didn’t get on very well, either.

Brian Desmond Hurst confirmed that he clashed with Bogarde during the shoot:

Dirk had to play a love scene with Virginia McKenna against a back-projection of a mountaintop in Kenya. Considerable tension had already grown between us after I repeatedly attempted to get him to stretch his abilities and take risks. ‘I’m a pop actor,' Dirk kept saying. ‘I can’t do that sort of acting.’ In one of the love scenes I was exasperated to find that, despite take after take, there was no passion or chemistry between the two supposed lovers. 'Dirk, could you look at Miss McKenna just once as if you would like to fuck her?’ This was reported to the studio heads and I was asked to apologize. And I did apologize—to Virginia McKenna.

Virginia McKenna said she "got on extremely well with Brian Desmond Hurst" and that Bogarde "was so sensitive and kind and helpful. He was much more experienced than I was and he was very supportive when we were rehearsing."

== Reception ==
The film premiered at Leicester Square Theatre on 19 January 1955, and was released in New York City in 1956.

Simba led to Virginia McKenna signing to Rank for a long-term contract. Brian Desmond Hurst said "She has a terrific future, properly handled. She has all the qualities of a young Bergman and a young Katharine Hepburn."

The movie failed to make the list in Kinematograph Weekly of films that were "money makers" in Britain during 1955.

=== Critical ===
According to academic Jim Cowans, "Critical reaction in Britain ran heavily positive, as twenty-three of twenty-eight critics (82 percent) praised Simba, while four disliked it and one gave it a mixed review... But if many reviews shared the film’s politics while thinking it had none, three left-wing publications saw the film as deeply political and colonialist. Cowans felt " Most American reviews... followed the British pattern, praising the film’s intensity and political balance."

The Daily Telegraph wrote "the director pulls no punches... no slick solutions are offered." The Observer wrote "it has a dreadful and effective rhythm, most sinister when it is still... an impressive picture."

Variety called it "grim realistic entertainment, departing from the conventional b.o. formula of escapist fare. As such, spotty returns loom, both in the home market and overseas."

Filmink argued "The studio uncovered a new female star in Virgina McKenna and Earl Cameron is excellent, but Dirk Bogarde was badly miscast in a film that either needed Jack Hawkins or to be rewritten for Bogarde."

Simba was banned by the Kenyan censorship board. The film has been criticised by historians for its depiction of Africans and colonialism; historian Herbert A. Friedman wrote that "In the United States the images were all pro-British and avid audiences watched motion pictures on the subject such as the 1955 Simba, where the Mau Mau were depicted as murderous hordes or betrayers who murdered their white masters, friends, and children in their beds." In Terrorism, Media, Liberation, scholar John David Slocum noted that "no mention is made of the Kikuyu socioeconomic situation, or grievances over the question of land ownership."

Cowans called it "the first film in a brief Mau Mau craze" which also included Mau Mau (1955), Safari (1956), Beyond Mombassa (1956) and Something of Value (1957).

== Notes ==
- Cowans, Jon (2015). Empire films and the crisis of colonialism, 1946–1959.
