= Value for Money =

1955 British comedy film by Ken Annakin

- Theatrical release poster
- Directed by: Ken Annakin
- Screenplay by: R. F. Delderfield; William Fairchild
- Based on: Value for Money by Derrick Boothroyd
- Produced by: Sergei Nolbandov
- Starring: John Gregson; Diana Dors; Susan Stephen; Derek Farr
- Cinematography: Geoffrey Unsworth
- Edited by: Geoffrey Foot
- Music by: Malcolm Arnold
- Production company: Group Film Productions
- Distributed by: J. Arthur Rank Film Distributors
- Release date: 9 August 1955
- Running time: 90 minutes
- Country: United Kingdom
- Language: English
- Budget: £150,000

Value for Money is a 1955 British comedy film directed by Ken Annakin and starring John Gregson, Diana Dors, Susan Stephen and Derek Farr. It was written by R. F. Delderfield and William Fairchild based on the 1953 novel of the same name by Derrick Boothroyd.

== Plot ==
Chayley Broadbent has had the importance of frugality impressed upon him all his life by his Yorkshire father. On his death, Chayley inherits £62,000, which includes his father's clothing factory in the (fictional) town of Barfield. He asks his girlfriend Ethel to marry him but is extremely unromantic, telling her it is to save money on his housekeeper. She accepts.

Chayley leaves Barfield for the first time in his life and visits London to attend the FA Cup Final. Afterwards he goes to a West End show and is pulled on stage by show-girl Ruthine West. They go to dinner in a posh restaurant, where his "look after the pennies" attitude leads to him questioning the bill, to the embarrassment of Ruthine. Back in Yorkshire, Chayley shows Ethel a photo of Ruthine. She angrily rips it up.

Chayley returns to London and asks Ruthine to marry him. She declines, saying she wants to marry someone who has made something of himself. Back home, he decides to be the kind of man that Ruthine wants, and, taking Mayor Higgins' advice on how to do this, gifts the Council land for a children's playground and community center. The local newspaper, where Ethel works as a reporter, runs an article on his generosity, but Ethel remains unimpressed, especially when Chayley says he is bringing Ruthine to Barfield.

Ruthine is surprised by how built-up and dirty Barfield is and how small and old-fashioned Chayley's house is. But when she hears stories about Chayley's wealth, she begins being affectionate to him. She attempts, unsuccessfully, to seduce him. Ruthine and Ethel decide to teach him a lesson. Chayley receives two writs for breach of promise: one from each of them. He chooses to marry Ethel.

== Cast ==
- John Gregson as Chayley Broadbent
- Diana Dors as Ruthine West
- Susan Stephen as Ethel
- Derek Farr as Duke Popplewell
- Frank Pettingell as Mayor Higgins
- Charles Victor as Lumm
- Ernest Thesiger as Lord Dewsbury
- Jill Adams as Joy
- Joan Hickson as Mrs. Perkins
- Donald Pleasence as Limpy
- John Glyn-Jones as Arkwright
- Leslie Phillips as Robjohns
- Ferdy Mayne as waiter
- Charles Lloyd-Pack as Mr. Gidbrook

== Production ==
Producer Sergei Nolbandov did not want Diana Dors in the movie but Ken Annakin, who had directed the actor in Vote for Huggett (1949), insisted. Dors was paid £5,000; it was her first movie under a three-picture contract with Rank.

Filming started 28 December 1954. It was the first film shot under Rank's new program to shoot everything in VistaVision. Filming took place at Pinewood Studios. Much of the Yorkshire location filming was in Batley, West Riding of Yorkshire, historically an area within the Heavy Woollen District.

Costumer designer Julie Harris recalled "we had to do two versions: an American version... one of them couldn’t show the navel. Perhaps it was the Americans who didn’t want to see the navel (laughs) and no cleavage, and for the English version it was all right."

== Critical reception ==
The Monthly Film Bulletin wrote: "A heavy-handed script and indifferent direction successfully flatten out any comic ideas the story may have originally possessed, and the minimum of laughs are extracted from its morass of stock situations and conventional 'Yorkshire' humour. John Gregson and Diana Dors fight a losing battle with the script, and of the supporting players only Ernest Thesiger, as an ancient and doddering peer, is able to bring a touch of genuinely eccentric humour to the proceedings. The two musical numbers are tamely executed, and the use of VistaVision seems scarcely justified."

Variety said the film will "give considerable amusement to unsophisticated local audiences, but which, may find it tough sledding in the Overseas territory. In the U. S., particularly, the Yorkshire dialect will not be a selling aid. This is a modestly amusing piece, staged on a bigger scale than the story would seem to warrant, and offering a touch of spectacle in a couple of song and dance numbers."

FilmInk argued the movie should have focused on Dors rather than Gregson and that the film was "smart enough to feature Diana Dors and dumb enough to misuse her."

Leslie Halliwell said: "Highly undistinguished north country romantic farce which wastes a good production and cast."

The Radio Times Guide to Films gave the film 2/5 stars, writing: "Take one bluff, penny-wise Yorkshireman and a blowsy, blonde showgirl, exaggerate every regional characteristic and then whisk them together into a romantic froth. Season with a couple of quaint cameos and you have this. The on-screen antics of John Gregson and Diana Dors (neither of whom are on form) are mediocre in this featherweight comedy."

In British Sound Films: The Studio Years 1928–1959 David Quinlan rated the film as "average", writing: "Quite lively comedy along traditional British lines."

== 1962 TV Adaptation ==
The novel was adapted for television in 1962 starring Wilfred Pickles.
