= The Young Lovers (1954 film) =

1954 British film by Anthony Asquith

- British release poster
- Directed by: Anthony Asquith
- Written by: Robin Estridge; George Tabori
- Based on: original script by George Tabori
- Produced by: Anthony Havelock-Allan
- Starring: Odile Versois; David Knight; Joseph Tomelty
- Cinematography: Jack Asher
- Edited by: Frederick Wilson
- Music by: Benjamin Frankel
- Production company: Group Film Productions
- Distributed by: General Film Distributors
- Release date: 24 August 1954
- Running time: 96 minutes
- Country: United Kingdom
- Language: English

The Young Lovers (U.S. Chance Meeting) is a 1954 British Cold War romantic drama film directed by Anthony Asquith and starring Odile Versois and David Knight. The film was produced by Anthony Havelock-Allan, with cinematography from Jack Asher and screenplay by George Tabori and Robin Estridge. It was shot at Pinewood Studios with sets designed by the art directors John Box and John Howell. At the 1955 British Film Academy Awards, The Young Lovers picked up the prizes for Best Screenplay and Most Promising Newcomer to Film (David Kossoff).

== Plot ==
Ted Hutchens is a code expert working in intelligence at the American Embassy in London. On a night out to the Royal Ballet at Covent Garden he meets a young woman named Anna, and the pair fall immediately in love. The problem is that Anna is the daughter of the ambassador in London of a country which is not named but it is implied that it is part of the Warsaw Pact. It is made clear to both that their relationship cannot continue in such a political climate, and their communications and movements are monitored by surveillance units from both sides. However, they continue to meet. Eventually, when Anna discovers she is pregnant, the couple decide that their love is more important to them than the demands of political exigency, and on a stolen yacht they make their escape together into a stormy English Channel. The film ends with a distant shot of the boat sailing off into an uncertain future.

The Young Lovers was noted in its time for its relatively frank depiction of a sexual relationship between an unmarried couple, and was praised for its even-handedness in presenting Anna's father in a sympathetic manner, as a man torn between his political beliefs and the desire for his daughter's happiness.

== Cast ==
- Odile Versois as Anna Szobek
- David Knight as Ted Hutchens
- Joseph Tomelty as Moffatt
- David Kossoff as Geza Szobek
- Theodore Bikel as Joseph
- Paul Carpenter as Gregg Pearson
- Peter Illing as Dr. Weissbrod
- John McLaren as Col. Margetson
- Bernard Rebel as Stefan
- Jill Adams as Judy
- Betty Marsden as Mrs. Forrester
- Peter Dyneley as Regan
- Percy Herbert as Richards
- Dora Bryan as Switchboard Operator
- Sam Kydd as Driver
- Aubrey Mather as Waiter
- Victor Maddern as Sailor
- Robin Bailey as Thomas Cook cashier
- Joan Sims as Telephone Operator

== Production ==
The script was originally written by George Tabori. Director Joseph Losey read it in Hollywood and called it "extraordinary... I very much wanted to do [it] but I was not in a position in Hollywood to get it produced."

Producer Tony Havelock Allen later claimed he wanted Mark Robson to direct and Jimmy Stewart to star. He said:

The Rank Organisation said they didn't have the money for an American star and wanted me to use the young American, David Knight. Puffin [Anthony Asquith] was the wrong director for it; it should have been made in that stark, realistic style the Americans were so good at, but Rank wanted to use Puffin. I hadn't made a film for some time and was getting lazy, so I agreed to do it as Rank wanted. It was a perfectly good film but it lacked guts; it didn't have that hard edge to it which it needed. It was intended as a blast against McCarthyism, and was written by a noted anti-Fascist, George Tabori.

Knight was an American who had studied at RADA; this got him a screen test and a six month contract in Hollywood to make a film that fell over. Earl St John saw his test and flew him back for Young Lovers - after further tests he got the party. Aquith said "Young love is a delicate thing and because David has never made love or been in front of the cameras I'm sure he will be splendid." Filming took place at Pinewood in January and February 1954.

== Release ==
The film was given a gala premiere at the Edinburgh Film Festival.

Universal refused to release the film because it could not get a seal from the Production Code (at the end of the film the heroine is pregnant and unmarried). United Artists all passed on the film.

The film's US rights were bought by a small company, Pacemaker, who bought them for $50,000. The film was released in the US as Chance Meeting.

== Reception ==
=== Critical ===
The Guardian called it "a film that must not be missed." The Observer declared it "was the most moving British film since Brief Encounter."

Variety called it "moving, sensitive... the plot unfolds tenderly by pointing the emotions of the young lovers without indulging in unnecessary politics, using rare touches of humer to relieve a tense situation with great skill.".

Filmink called it excellently made, something of a hidden gem, but no one went to see it; maybe it would have had more of an audience with recognisable stars (for instance, Dirk Bogarde and Mai Zetterling who would have been more suitable here than in, say, Desperate Moment)."

Pianist Arthur Rubenstein, a friend of Asquith's, called the movie "very good indeed. I especially liked his use of the music from Swan Lake. It was absolutely right. Swan Lake always moves me and I congratulated him [Asquith] on using it with such wonderful effect."

=== Box office ===
Variety reported the film opened in London "below expectations despite unanimous press raves."

The movie was a commercial disappointment. In June 1955 Variety reported it "hasn't amounted to much in the U. S."
