= The Woman for Joe =

1955 British drama film

- British poster
- Directed by: George More O'Ferrall
- Written by: Neil Paterson
- Produced by: Leslie Parkyn
- Starring: Diane Cilento; George Baker; Jimmy Karoubi; David Kossoff
- Cinematography: Georges Périnal
- Edited by: Alfred Roome
- Music by: Malcolm Arnold
- Production company: Group Film Productions
- Distributed by: J. Arthur Rank Film Distributors
- Release date: 25 August 1955 (London)
- Running time: 91 minutes
- Country: United Kingdom
- Language: English

The Woman for Joe is a 1955 British drama film directed by George More O'Ferrall and starring Diane Cilento, George Baker, Jimmy Karoubi and David Kossoff. The screenplay concerns the owner of a circus sideshow and his prize attraction (a midget), who become romantically involved with the same woman. The film was made at Pinewood Studios. The sets were designed by the art director Maurice Carter. Filmink magazine called it "a rare movie to not only feature a short statured person in a lead role (if not the lead role), but to have him play a complex, contemporary, three-dimensional character... one of the most fascinating films from the Rank Organisation, and the studio had a lot of guts to make it."

== Plot ==
Joe Harrap sets up a circus. He becomes business partners with George Wilson, a little person.

George pulls strings to obtain a job in the circus for Mary, a Hungarian barmaid he's fallen madly in love with. Mary is happy to have the job, singing to the lions, but although she likes George, her feelings for Joe are stronger. The jealousy and tensions caused affect the running of the circus.

== Cast ==
- Diane Cilento as Mary
- George Baker as Joe Harrop
- Jimmy Karoubi as George Wilson
- David Kossoff as Max
- Violet Farebrother as Ma Gollatz
- Earl Cameron as Lemmie
- Sydney Tafler as Butch
- Alf Dean as Vendini
- Patrick Westwood as Freddie the Kid
- Derek Sydney as Harry the Spice
- Verna Gilmore as Princess Circassy
- Martin Miller as Iggy Pulitzer
- Meier Tzelniker as Sol Goldstein
- Miriam Karlin as Gladys
- Terence Longdon as doctor at the circus (uncredited)
- Arthur Lowe as George's agent (uncredited)
- Philip Stainton as Sullivan

== Production ==
The film was based on an original script by Neil Paterson who had written The Kidnappers. It was originally known as The Life of George Wilson. The film was one of only a few from Group Film Productions to revolve around a female character.

Filming took place from January to March 1955 at Pinewood Studios in London. George Baker, who had just appeared in The Ship That Died of Shame, was borrowed from Associated British to play the male lead. In his memoirs, Baker called it "a smashing script" although "I couldn’t help thinking that the fairground boss, Joe, whom I was to play, should have been played by Peter Finch. But I was determined to make as good a job of it as I could."

Jimmy Karoubi was a little person from Algeria who had been discovered by the producers working as an MC in a club in Paris. According to Diane Cilento, he was later arrested for murder and was sent to prison.

Baker recalls director George More O'Farrell as "a nice enough man, but he really had no idea what he was doing. He knew nothing about the camera, he did not know what lens to use or why. He needed all the help he could get and, when given it, he almost always refused to take it." Baker said during filming that, despite being married at the time, he had a short affair with Brigitte Bardot who was then in England making Doctor at Sea.

Maurice Carter, who designed the sets, called the film a "disaster":

We had a French cameraman on it and it was the story of a fat woman and a circus midget, a rather frightening horrible story... I had to build a circus tent and this particular cameraman wanted to light it from out side, to get the glow of out side light, the sort of the diminished light of an interior, diffused light of a circus tent. So I had to build it all of gauze, to get him the strength of light to photograph inside. Very very difficult because gauze doesn't behave like canvas and we had terrible troubles starching the gauze to get the crispness to form the shape of a tent properly. Very difficult to things, highly technical and very difficult things to build tents.

Diane Cilento released a single from the film, ‘A Fool and His Heart'.

== Critical reception ==
The Evening Standard called the film "moving and enthralling." The Sunday Sun found it "disappointing."

The Radio Times Guide to Films gave the film 2/5 stars, writing: "A slow and rather disappointing Rank production, this is the old "Hunchback of Notre Dame" chestnut, about fairground owner George Baker who hires a midget, only for him to turn into a Napoleon figure, lusting for power and lusting, too, for Diane Cilento, who's in love with Baker. It's pretty nasty, in fact, with none of the poetry of Victor Hugo's story, let alone Tod Browning's similarly themed masterpiece, Freaks [1932]."

Variety said it "breaks little new ground. The melodrama follows a conventional pattern, is devoid of any surprise twist, and limps rather lamely to its inevitable climax. At best it can only be classed as a moderate b.o. candidate."

Sight and Sound called it a "fairground triangle of manager, blonde and midget. A subject with possibilities that limp and sentimental treatment fails to realise."

Filmink argued the character of George "is easily one of the most the most fleshed out, three-dimensional, short statured characters in 20th century cinema" but "This doesn’t make The Woman for Joe a decent movie. An interesting one, absolutely – but not well made."

TV Guide wrote, "the highlight of this picture is the elaborate circus set, but this does little to benefit the unfolding of the plot, which is predictable."

AllMovie noted "an excellent showcase for leading lady Diane Cilento (later better known as Mrs. Sean Connery)... What could have been an exercise in tawdriness is redeemed by the colorful camerawork of Georges Perinal."

In British Sound Films: The Studio Years 1928–1959 David Quinlan rated the film as "average", writing: "Difficult subject, not too cleverly handled."

== Notes ==
- Baker, George (2002). The way to Wexford : the autobiography. Headline.
