= Up to His Neck =

1954 British film by John Paddy Carstairs

- Original British quad poster
- Directed by: John Paddy Carstairs
- Written by: John Paddy Carstairs; Patrick Kirwan; Ted Willis
- Story by: Peter Rogers
- Produced by: Hugh Stewart
- Starring: Ronald Shiner; Brian Rix; Laya Raki
- Cinematography: Ernest Steward
- Edited by: Alfred Roome
- Music by: Benjamin Frankel
- Production company: Group Film Productions
- Distributed by: General Film Distributors
- Release date: 1 August 1954
- Running time: 91 minutes
- Country: United Kingdom
- Language: English

Up to His Neck is a 1954 British comedy film directed by John Paddy Carstairs, starring Ronald Shiner, Hattie Jacques and Anthony Newley. It was written by Carstairs, Patrick Kirwan and Ted Willis from a story by Peter Rogers.

== Plot ==
Sailor Jack Carter has been marooned for ten years on a South Seas island, and treated as a King by natives. He is eventually rescued by the Royal Navy, who then use him to train up commandos to recover a stolen submarine, and to foil an oriental criminal plot.

== Cast ==
- Ronald Shiner as Jack Carter
- Brian Rix as Wiggy
- Laya Raki as Lao Win Tan
- Harry Fowler as Smudge
- Colin Gordon as Lieutenant Commander Sterning
- Michael Brennan as Chief Petty Officer Brazier
- Bryan Forbes as Subby
- Alec Mango as bandit general
- Anthony Newley as Tommy
- Gerald Campion as Skinny
- Roland Curram as Jock
- Norman Mitchell as Fungus
- Hattie Jacques as Rakiki
- John Warwick as Lieutenant Truman
- Martin Boddey as Chang
- Philip Stainton as Mr Woo
- Andreas Malandrinos as chieftain
- Charles Cameron as Commander in Chief
- Cyril Chamberlain as Walter
- John Warren as Collins
- Charles Houston as Davidson
- John Horsley as navigating officer
- Harold Kasket as croupier
- Shirley Burniston as Olga, nightclub hostess
- Sara Leighton as Fanny, nightclub hostess
- Jacqueline Chan as Sung-Yo, nightclub hostess
- Hermione Harvey as sword dancer
- John Singer as R/T Rating

== Production ==
Like several Shiner vehicles the film appeared to be a reworking of a 1930s British comedy, in this case Jack Ahoy.

Shiner's previous film for Rank had been Top of the Form directed by John Paddy Carstairs and produced by Paul Soskin. According to Hugh Stewart, Carstairs refused to work with Soskin again so Earl St John of Rank assigned the job to Stewart.

Stewart said "the thing did very well. And because I was able to do some comedy, but also cut loose a bit in terms of daft ideas I then." It led to him producing the films of Norman Wisdom.

The film was shot at Pinewood Studios near London with sets designed by the art director Alex Vetchinsky.

Brian Rix, who had a support role, later recalled "those were happy days. We were all glad to be working and we were all glad to be making films. None of us was in a position to be choosy about the scripts and, frankly, we didn’t want to be. Take the money, enjoy yourselves as much as possible and be grateful: that was our attitude."

== Reception ==
The Monthly Film Bulletin wrote: "This farce, reminiscent of the pre-war George Formby comedies, seems to have learnt nothing during the intervening years. Most of the jokes fall flat, the pace is forced and there are lapses into dubious taste. Ronald Shiner shouts his way through it all with high spirits and works hard with a script almost devoid of funny lines. Laya Raki, well equipped as the seductive spy, has little to do."

Kine Weekly wrote: "Jolly and exciting farrago of colourful, side-splitting nonsense, set somewhere in the Orient. ... Ronald Shiner is the kingpin, and he not only puts new life into time-honoured gags and situations, culminating in a completely daffy submarine sequence, but also keeps the laughs flowing merrily."

In British Sound Films: The Studio Years 1928–1959 David Quinlan rated the film as "average", writing: "Laboured remake of Jack Ahoy."

Brian Rix wrote in his memoirs, "Personally, I thought it was a very forced affair, but it made money and can still be seen, from time to time, on the telly. The cast have, in the main, outlived any shortcomings in the film, but I bet... [they] still wince when it comes up on the screens. Probably one of the authors does, too, for Lord Ted Willis was responsible for the script."
