= A Day to Remember (1953 film) =

British comedy drama film by Ralph Thomas

- Theatrical release poster
- Directed by: Ralph Thomas
- Written by: Robin Estridge
- Based on: The Hand and the Flower by Jerrard Tickell
- Produced by: Betty Box
- Starring: Stanley Holloway; Joan Rice; Odile Versois; Donald Sinden; James Hayter
- Cinematography: Ernest Steward
- Edited by: Gerald Thomas
- Music by: Clifton Parker
- Production company: Group Film Productions
- Distributed by: General Film Distributors (UK); Republic (US)
- Release date: 10 November 1953
- Running time: 86 mins
- Country: United Kingdom
- Language: English

A Day to Remember is a 1953 British comedy drama film directed by Ralph Thomas and starring an ensemble cast including Stanley Holloway, Donald Sinden, James Hayter and Bill Owen. It was written by Robin Estridge based on the 1952 novel The Hand and Flower by Jerrard Tickell.

== Plot ==
The darts team of a London public house go on a day trip to Boulogne-sur-Mer in France. On the eve of their visit to France, the members of the Hand & Flower pub darts team gather for a drink. The day trip has been organised by one of the team, Percy, who is a travel agent. For some of the team, it is their first ever trip abroad, while for others it is the first time they have returned to France since their service in World War I or World War II. Charley is looking forward to meeting some French mademoiselles, but Fred, the pub's landlord, whose wife is within earshot, says there'll be "none of that sort of thing". Stan has a plan to buy watches in France and smuggle them back into Britain, avoiding customs duty. Jim is going through a rocky patch with his fiancée, whom he suspects considers him to be boring and staid.

The following day, the group meet at London Victoria station and catch the boat train to Folkestone Harbour station for the ferry across the English Channel to Boulogne. Once they have landed in France, despite the insistence of Fred that they stick together, Jim departs to visit the area where he had been involved in heavy fighting during 1944 when British troops had arrived to liberate France. In the local florists, the shop owners refuse to take his money for flowers for his friend's grave. After taking them to the cemetery where his comrade is buried, he visits a local farm and meets Martine, with whom he spent time eight years before when she was eleven. Now an attractive young woman, she recognises him and invites him to have lunch with her family who also remember him. They immediately strike up a chemistry, which his relationship with his fiancée in England lacks. However, Martine is engaged to a local lawyer who is expecting to land a prestigious partnership in Paris.

Back in town, the rest of the group enjoy lunch in a cafe and then separate to tour around the town. Stan goes and picks up his black market watches, while "Shorty", stewing over those who use his resented nickname, gets drunk and joins the French Foreign Legion, in spite of Charley's efforts to stop him. Fred is enticed by a young woman into a bar and she persuades him to buy champagne for them and dance with her. He is embarrassed when Charley finds him in there. Percy, the travel agent, becomes violently homesick and desperate for a cup of tea.

Reassembling, the group attempt but fail to retrieve Shorty from service in the Foreign Legion, and then drift towards the docks and the ship for the return trip, wondering what has happened to Jim who has been missing all day. Stan sees a policeman calling to him, so, thinking he knows about the watches, throws them into the water; but he only wants to return Stan's passport which he had left at the customs check.

Jim has fallen in love with Martine, but they argue over whether they can be together, and he heads for the docks, while Martine goes to rejoin her fiancée. But once there, she tells him she does not love him and cannot marry him, and then drives hurriedly towards the docks. Meanwhile, on a blind date with a friend, Jim's fiancée in London has met and struck up a relationship with an American serviceman. Arriving as his ship is leaving, Martine shouts her true feelings for Jim, and they agree to meet again when he returns to France.

== Cast ==
- Stanley Holloway as Charley Porter
- Donald Sinden as Jim Carver
- Joan Rice as Vera Mitchell
- Odile Versois as Martine Berthier
- James Hayter as Fred Collins
- Harry Fowler as Stan Harvey
- Edward Chapman as Mr Robinson
- Peter Jones as Percy Goodall
- Bill Owen as "Shorty" Sharpe
- Meredith Edwards as Bert Tripp
- George Coulouris as Foreign Legion Captain
- Vernon Gray as Marvin
- Thora Hird as Mrs Trott
- Theodore Bikel as Henri Dubot
- Brenda De Banzie as Mrs Collins
- Lily Kann as Martine's grandmother
- Georgette Anys as Jeanne Sautet
- Marianne Stone as Doreen
- Shirley Eaton as young woman on ferry (uncredited)
- Jacques Cey as Maurice

== Production ==
Filming started April 1953. The movie was partly filmed on location in Boulogne. Filming finished on June 9. It featured an early appearance by Shirley Eaton

Box offered the female lead to Brigitte Bardot but was turned down because Bardot felt her English was too limited. However Bardot would appear in Doctor at Sea for Box.

The film was distributed in the US by Republic as part of a five picture deal between that studio and Rank.

Sinden wrote in his memoirs "what a delightful film this turned out to be" adding Ralph Thomas was "the most cuddly of directors" who it was a relief to work with after having made Mogambo with John Ford.

== Reception ==
The Monthly Film Bulletin wrote: "This British comedy faithfully reflects most of 'ze naughty French – ze incredible English' situations with which we have become familiar in recent years, and stresses its inanities with an almost ruthless intensity. The large cast works untiringly at a script containing all the characters one would expect to find on such a trip – low comedy is dutifully contrasted with the most hygienic of love stories and the usual tourist views of France are there in the background."

Kine Weekly wrote: "Jolly and warm-hearted, if slightly naive and extravagant, comedy drama. ... The picture has a bright central idea, but goes a bit off the rails every time it tries to take itself seriously. ... The cast is, however, versatile."

Filmink argued the movie has "an endearing desire to please and technical competency" but "lack[s] something."
