= Peter de Sarigny =

South African film producer

Peter de Sarigny (1911-1999) was a South African film producer who worked mostly in Britain. He was a former journalist who served in the RAF during World War Two, and had been a member of the International Brigades in Spain. He worked for a number of years with the Boulting Brothers, then for the Rank Organisation.

== Selected credits ==
- Fame Is the Spur (1947)
- Brighton Rock (1948)
- The Guinea Pig (1948)
- Seven Days to Noon (1950)
- Malta Story (1953)
- Simba (1955)
- True as a Turtle (1957)
- Never Let Go (1960)
- Waltz of the Toreadors (1962)
