= Fast and Loose (1954 film) =

1954 British film by Gordon Parry

- British poster by Eric Pulford
- Directed by: Gordon Parry
- Written by: Ben Travers; A.R. Rawlinson
- Based on: A Cuckoo in the Nest; 1925 play by Ben Travers
- Produced by: Teddy Baird
- Starring: Stanley Holloway; Kay Kendall; Brian Reece
- Cinematography: Jack Asher; Reginald H. Morris
- Edited by: Frederick Wilson
- Music by: Philip Green
- Production company: Group Film Productions
- Distributed by: General Film Distributors
- Release date: 15 March 1954
- Running time: 75 minutes
- Country: United Kingdom
- Language: English

Fast and Loose is a 1954 British comedy film directed by Gordon Parry and starring Stanley Holloway, Kay Kendall and Brian Reece. It was written by Ben Travers and A.R. Rawlinson based on the 1925 play A Cuckoo in the Nest by Travers, the first of his Aldwych farces, which had previously been adapted as a 1933 film of the same title.

== Plot ==
Peter Wickham puts his wife Barbara on a train and then misses it himself. He meets his ex-girlfriend Carol Hankin at the station; they hire a car and take off in search of Barbara. The car breaks down and they spend the night at a country pub which has only one guest-room. When Barbara and Carol's husband also turn up, farce ensues.

== Cast ==
- Stanley Holloway as Major George Crabb
- Kay Kendall as Carol Hankin
- Brian Reece as Peter Wickham
- Charles Victor as Lumper
- June Thorburn as Barbara 'Babsie' Wickham
- Reginald Beckwith as Reverend Tripp-Johnson
- Vida Hope as Gladys
- Joan Young as Mrs. Gullett, inn manageress
- Fabia Drake as Mrs Crabb
- Dora Bryan as Mary Rawlings, the maid
- Aubrey Mather as Noony
- Toke Townley as Alfred
- Alexander Gauge as Hankin
- Eliot Makeham as railway porter
- John Warren as chauffeur

== Production ==
It was one of a number of stage adaptations made by Group Film Productions around this time.

The film was shot at Pinewood Studios near London with sets designed by the art director John Howell.

Brian Reece had just appeared on stage in London in The Seven Year Itch. Filming took place in October 1953.

== Critical reception ==
The Monthly Film Bulletin wrote: "A dated farce of the Aldwych school. Unfortunately the players have not the ability of the Aldwych teams for this sort of material (Kay Kendall alone manages to make something of her part), and the film is over-extravagant without the saving grace of a logical art of nonsense. The dialogue is stretched to the utmost for the sake of doubles entendres; for example, 'I'm taking a young lady with me, and we're going pretty far'."

Kine Weekly wrote: "The picture, reminiscent of early British talkies, has a wild moyotcycle chase but otherwise it's all talk. Unfortunately, Ben Travers' dialogue dates. Kay Kendall is most attractive, but neither her physical attributes nor her talents are flattered by the rôle of Carol. Stanley Holloway, Brian Reece, Joan Young and Fabia Drake also work hard, but they, too, find it difficult to score. Yet harmless and innocuous as it all is, the Censor has given it an 'A' certificate."

In British Sound Films: The Studio Years 1928–1959 David Quinlan rated the film as "mediocre", writing: "Supposed comedy is much inferior to A Cuckoo in the Nest (1934)." Filmink called it "clunky... pretty dire."

Leslie Halliwell said: "spiritless and miscast remake of A Cuckoo in the Nest; all talents below form."

TV Guide called the film an "unfunny remake of A Cuckoo in the Nest (1933)."

Kay Kendall's biographer called it "a witless, braying comedy... After Genevieve — and even the oddities of Meet Mr. Lucifer — this role was such a letdown that Kay barely managed to walk through her performance with a slightly annoyed look on her face... Everyone wildly overacted except for Kay, who looked distinctly bored throughout, as if she were mentally tallying the months left in her Rank contract."
