= Mad About Men =

1954 British film by Ralph Thomas

- Directed by: Ralph Thomas
- Written by: Peter Blackmore
- Screenplay by: Peter Blackmore
- Based on: story by Peter Blackmore
- Produced by: Betty E. Box; Earl St. John
- Starring: Glynis Johns; Donald Sinden; Anne Crawford; Margaret Rutherford
- Cinematography: Ernest Steward
- Edited by: Gerald Thomas
- Music by: Benjamin Frankel; Ronald Hanmer
- Production company: Group Film Productions
- Distributed by: General Film Distributors
- Release date: 16 November 1954
- Running time: 90 minutes
- Country: United Kingdom
- Language: English

Mad About Men is a 1954 British Technicolor comedy film directed by Ralph Thomas and starring Glynis Johns, Donald Sinden, Anne Crawford and Margaret Rutherford. It was written by Peter Blackmore, who also wrote the 1948 film Miranda which preceded Mad About Men. Johns appears in both films as the mermaid Miranda Trewella. However, Rank Films insisted it was not a sequel.

== Plot ==
When gymnastics school teacher Caroline Trewella goes on holiday at her family's home in Cornwall, she meets her distant mermaid relative Miranda, who looks exactly like her. She agrees to let Miranda trade places with her, while she goes on a bicycling trip with a friend. Caroline feigns an accident, pretending that this requires her to use a wheelchair for a few weeks, thus providing a cover for the fact that Miranda has a fish tail instead of legs. Nurse Carey, who knows about Miranda [and was in the earlier film], is hired to attend Miranda.

Caroline is engaged to Ronald Baker, but when he shows up, Miranda does not like him at all. She decides to make Caroline a better match. She flirts outrageously with two eligible bachelors, Jeff Saunders and Colonel Barclay Sutton, right in front of Ronald. When she discovers that Ronald works in the government sanitation department (and approves of dumping garbage into the ocean), she dumps a tureen of cold soup on his head.

Meanwhile, Barbara Davenport, Barclay's fiancée, takes an understandable dislike to Miranda. While out swimming, she discovers Miranda's secret and arranges for "Caroline" to sing at a charity concert, plotting to reveal her true nature. Caroline reads about the forthcoming concert during her holiday, guesses what Barbara intends, and rushes back to take Miranda's place, foiling Barbara's scheme.

Afterward, Jeff takes Caroline boating. When he tries to kiss her, she resists at first, then willingly gives in, while a somewhat sad Miranda watches.

== Cast ==
- Glynis Johns as Caroline Trewella / Miranda Trewella
- Donald Sinden as Jeff Saunders
- Anne Crawford as Barbara Davenport
- Margaret Rutherford as Nurse Carey
- Dora Bryan as Berengaria
- Nicholas Phipps as Colonel Barclay Sutton
- Peter Martyn as Ronald Baker
- Noell Purcell as Percy
- Joan Hickson as Mrs Forster
- Judith Furse as Viola
- Irene Handl as Mme. Blanche
- David Hurst as Signor Mantalini
- Martin Miller as Dr. Fergus
- Deryck Guyler as Editor
- Anthony Oliver as Pawnbroker
- Lawrence Ward as Alphonse
- Martin Boddey as Marco
- Ken Richmond as Zampa
- Harry Welchman as Symes
- Meredith Edwards as Police Constable
- Lucy Griffiths as Dr. Fergus' Secretary
- John Horsley as Sports Organiser
- Stringer Davis as the Vicar
- Henry B. Longhurst as Mayor
- Gibb McLaughlin as Ticket Collector
- Dandy Nichols as Nurse Carey's Landlady
- George Woodbridge as Fisherman Outside Pub
- Damaris Hayman as Tall Choral Society Singer

== Production ==
Filming took place in May 1954. The film was shot at Pinewood Studios and on location at Polperro in Cornwall and Long Crendon in Oxfordshire. Filming also took place in Brighton including at the Palace Pier. The film's sets were designed by the art director George Provis. Ralph Thomas and Betty Box made it between Doctor in the House and Doctor at Sea.

Dora Bryan, who played the mermaid Berengaria, later recalled she almost drowned because of her heavy tail and that fish in the tanks would die because Glynis Johns insisted on the water being hot.

== Critical reception ==
Variety felt "this has not strong hopes of repeating the boxoffice impact of the original. Despite an impressive local cast, it limps along rather uneasily and can only expect spotty returns... There are broad comedy possibilities, and these ‘have been fully and conventionally exploited, but there is little sparkle to the dialog."

The Monthly Film Bulletin wrote: "This sequel to Miranda follows much the same lines as its forerunner. The plot and invention are hardly sufficient to sustain a film of this length, but a mildly amusing comedy emerges from a fairly bright script and some competent playing in the smaller roles. Glynis Johns brings gusto and sly charm to the part of the mermaid vamp, while Margaret Rutherford provides another of her familiar character cameos. Technicolor is used, on the whole, with good taste."

Kine Weekly wrote: "Jolly and exciting Technicolor extravaganza. ... Glynis Johns, clever and resourceful in the dual role, is equally at home on land and water. Margaret Rutherford excels as a wily old nanny, and the male cast, also hand picked, never lets up. The settings, too, are most effective, and the climax brilliantly engineered. Excellent light fare."

Radio Times called the film "outdated hokum, a cliché-ridden story ... this is certainly not the equal of the charming original." FilmInk argued "It has a decent central idea... but is totally undermined by sloppy plotting that throws away opportunities wholesale."

AllMovie praised it as a "delightful sequel to the saucy British comedy-fantasy Miranda."
