= Earl St. John =

American film producer (1892–1968)

- Born: June 14, 1892; Baton Rouge, Louisiana
- Died: February 26, 1968 (aged 75)
- Occupation: Film producer
- Years active: 1950–1964
- Known for: Executive producer, Rank Organisation

Earl St. John (14 June 1892 – 26 February 1968) was an American film producer in overall charge of production for The Rank Organisation at Pinewood Studios from October 1950 to June 1964, and was credited as executive producer on 131 films. He was known as the "Earl of Pinewood". He was elected a Director of the Company in September, 1951.

John Davis of Rank called him "the greatest showman that The Rank Organisation has ever had, and probably the greatest showman to have lived in this country. "

His achievements including promoting Norman Wisdom and Peter Finch as film stars, and the box office success of Genevieve and Doctor in the House. However it has been argued "St John's fame has been completely overshadowed" by J. Arthur Rank and John Davis.

== Early life ==
St. John was born in Baton Rouge, Louisiana. His father wanted him to become a soldier but he ran away from a military academy aged 17 and began his career as a page boy for Sarah Bernhardt's company.

St. John's uncle worked in the film business and he worked for him when he was 21. He worked as a poster boy then took two religious films around the US and Mexico. He worked during the Mexican Civil War and met Pancho Villa. He fell out with his uncle and joined the Mutual Film Company.

=== Move to England ===
St. John served in France with the Texas division during World War I. He demobilised in Liverpool, England, and elected to stay on in the country.

In the early 1920s, St. John ran a small picture theatre in Manchester, the Ardwick Green Picture Theatre, and became successful. In 1924, he joined Paramount Theatres Limited, building up its circuit and opening the Plaza and Carlton cinemas. In 1930, they took over the Astoria Cinemas and St. John was responsible for them as well.

Paramount was bought out by Odeon in 1938 and St. John joined The Rank Organisation. In 1939 he became personal assistant to John Davis.

In 1946 St. John was appointed chief production adviser for the Rank Organisation.

In May 1947 he was appointed joint managing director of Two Cities Films along with Josef Somlo. (Somlo would quit in October 1947.) Their films included Hamlet, Fame is the Spur, Uncle Silas, The October Man, Vice Versa, The Mark of Cain, One Night with You, Mr Perrin and Mr Trail, and Sleeping Car to Trieste.

== Head of Rank ==
=== Early films ===
In 1948 he was appointed Executive Producer at the studios by Rank's Managing Director John Davis with a brief to rein in financial losses. "Some producers objected because he was a showman," said one producer of this time. Under his austere and autocratic control, location filming was cut back, and budgets slashed. He oversaw a reduction of production costs of 45% from 1948 and set a ceiling of £200,000 for films aimed at the British market (with £175,000 regarded as a safer figure), allowing the amount to go to £325,000 if a co production with the US. The intention was for the average Rank budget to be £175,000.

Early films made under St. John at Rank included the musical Trottie True (1949) with Jean Kent, and the fantasy The Rocking Horse Winner (1949) with John Mills. The Woman in Question (1950) was a thriller with Kent and Dirk Bogarde, and Highly Dangerous (1950) was an unsuccessful attempt to restore Margaret Lockwood to her mid 1940s popularity. The Reluctant Widow (1950) starred Kent and Guy Rolfe; Rolfe was in Prelude to Fame (1950).

More successful than these were the war movies, They Were Not Divided (1950) and Morning Departure, and the drama The Browning Version (1951). In 1950 St John warned that British film budgets could not go below £100,000 "if we are to give the public its money's worth." In August 1950 he announced Rank's plan was to make 15-20 films a year.

Browning Version was based on a play by Terence Rattigan and St. John would go on to approve a number of films based on plays: "I started out as manager of a small out-of-town cinema, and I viewed films from the out-of-London angle," he explained in 1951; "This experience made me realise that the ordinary people in the remotest places in the country were entitled to see the works of the best modern British playwrights." The film was directed by Anthony Asquith, and St. John promptly agreed to finance another play adaptation from that director, The Importance of Being Earnest (1952), which was popular.

Also popular was Encore (1951) based on the stories of W. Somerset Maugham, Venetian Bird (1952), a thriller from the director-producer team of Ralph Thomas and Betty E. Box who would become crucial to Rank, and The Card (1952) with Alec Guinness. Less popular were dramas like It Started in Paradise (1952), Personal Affair (1953) and The Final Test (1953).

Rank's films in 1951 and 1952 were made through British Film Makers, a scheme where Rank financed films in conjunction with the National Film Finance Corporation. From late 1952 onwards Rank financed films alone, as Group Film Productions.

In February 1952 Earl St John of Rank announced the company would make a slate of 12 movies at a cost of £1,500,000, including Fanfare for Fig Leaves with Kay Kendall and Ian Hunter, Tonight at 8:30 with Ted Ray, and The Planter's Wife.

In August 1952 St John declared Rank would make more films abroad including Campbell's Kingdom (not made for several years), Scottish Settlement (never made) and Desperate Moment.

St. John decided to finance an action drama set during the Malayan Emergency, The Planter's Wife (1952), directed by Ken Annakin and starring Jack Hawkins and Anthony Steel. In an attempt to appeal to American audiences, St. John arranged for Claudette Colbert to co-star. The movie was not successful in the US but was a big hit in Britain, and led to St. John making several movies with imperial settings. These included Malta Story (1952), a hugely popular World War Two story with Guinness, Hawkins and Steel; The Seekers (1954), an adventure tale set in New Zealand with Hawkins and Glynis Johns; Above Us the Waves (1955), a war film with Mills and John Gregson; Simba (1955), set in the Mau Mau Uprising; and The Black Tent (1956) set in Africa, all three with Donald Sinden.

St. John commissioned a number of thrillers at Rank, including: Hunted (1952), and Desperate Moment (1953), both with Dirk Bogarde; The Long Memory (1953) with John Mills; The Net (1953); Turn the Key Softly (1953); The Kidnappers (1953); Forbidden Cargo (1954); Passage Home (1955); Lost (1956); and House of Secrets (1956).

Dramas tended to be less popular such as The Young Lovers (1954); The Woman for Joe (1955); and Jacqueline, (1956).

In the early 1950s, St. John moved Rank more into the comedy area with films such as: Made in Heaven (1952); Penny Princess (1953) with Bogarde; Always a Bride (1953); and A Day to Remember (1953). He was a big believer in making films in colour to compete with television. He also imported many actors from Europe to appear in Rank films.

St. John spotted Norman Wisdom on television in a Christmas Party special, signed him to a seven year contract and starred him in Trouble in Store (1953). "I feel we have here the most exciting screen comedian since Chaplin," said St John. The film was a huge success and led to a series of popular Wisdom movies such as: Man of the Moment (1955); and One Good Turn (1955).

Another great St. John success was Genevieve, directed by Henry Cornelius, starring John Gregson, Dinah Sheridan, Kenneth More and Kay Kendall, although St John was reportedly originally not enthusiastic about it being made. St John had put Kendall under long term contract in 1952.

However his most profitable comedies were the "Doctor" series from Thomas and Box, starring Dirk Bogarde, starting with Doctor in the House (1954). This led to several sequels including Doctor at Sea (1955).

Other comedies included :You Know What Sailors Are (1954); Mad About Men (1954); The Beachcomber (1954) with Robert Newton; To Paris with Love (1955) with Guinness; All for Mary (1955); Value for Money (1955) with Gregson and Diana Dors; Simon and Laura (1955) with Peter Finch and Kendall; An Alligator Named Daisy (1955), with Donald Sinden and Dors again; and Jumping for Joy (1956) with Frankie Howerd.

Less popular were the musicals. He announced a film with Petula Clark called Convent Garden that was never made. As Long as They're Happy (1955) was made.

St. John put writer Norman Hudis under long term contract early in that writers career.

According to a 1954 profile:

His highly-paid job gives him power to say what films will be made, how they will be made and who will make them. He works with 12 producer - director teams, 21 contract artists, a varying number of guest artists, a story department consisting of an editor, two assistants and three readers, and three contract scriptwriters. Pinewood Studios' quota of 15 films a year, for which St. John is responsible and which average £150,000 each, is the largest in Britain today. In his films, St. John has fostered such stars as Petula Clark, Kay Kendall, Anthony Steel, Terence Morgan, Dirk Bogarde and John Gregson and he has helped to promote Jack Hawkins, Glynis Johns and Norman Wisdom. In the past four years he has supervised the making of more than 50 films... St. John has earned a reputation for being a driving showman with a gift for succinct expression.

"He is like a ringmaster who is happy as long as his charges are performing correctly," said producer Peter Rogers. "His approach is: do what you want, but you know what I want," said director Robert Hamer.

According to academics Sue Harper and Vincent Porter, Rank "was run like a boys’ public school, where everyone was expected to behave properly. Davis was the headmaster and Earl St John the second master who was expected to iron out any local difficulties." They argued St John "was not much help" at the studio "as he spent most of his time covering his own back. That is probably why Davis appointed the ambitious James Archibald as his personal assistant and cut St John out of the creative process for over a year by intercepting all his mail." They declared St John's main job was to plan the company's annual output of films:

Although he could sometimes act as both a creator and a facilitator by persuading Rank to make a particular picture, he subsequently became a ‘yes-man’ to Davis, often having to act as the buffer between the producers and Davis’s diktats. Publicly, however, St John claimed that, as the person in charge of production, he judged story ideas or treatments by their warmth or their sincerity, and considered that his most vital task was to fit the right subject to the right production team. Although producers or directors sometimes came to him with ideas, he also passed ideas from the story department onto them.

== International films ==
Rank had ambitions to make films that appeared in America. St. John used Gregory Peck in The Million Pound Note (1954) and The Purple Plain (1954).

In July 1954 Rank announced all its films would be made using Visa Vision.

In 1956 Rank made less comedies and more thrillers.

In the late 1950s St. John financed a series of adventure films shot on location overseas (often in colour) based on some best-selling novel. These included Campbell's Kingdom (1957), set in Canada, with Bogarde; Dangerous Exile (1957), a French Revolution tale with Louis Jourdan; Windom's Way (1957), set in Malaya, with Peter Finch; Robbery Under Arms (1957), set in Australia, with Finch; Seven Thunders with Stephen Boyd and Tony Wright; Sea Fury (1958), made in Spain with Victor McLaglen; The Wind Cannot Read (1958), set in India, with Bogarde; A Tale of Two Cities (1958), set in France, with Bogarde; The Gypsy and the Gentleman (1958) with Melinda Mercouri; A Night to Remember (1958) with Kenneth More; Nor the Moon by Night (1959), set in South Africa with Michael Craig; The 39 Steps (1959) and North West Frontier (1959) with More; and Ferry to Hong Kong (1960), made in Hong Kong with Orson Welles.

Rank continued to make comedies such as The Captain's Table (1959) with Gregson and Sinden and Too Many Crooks (1959). St John also greenlit a series of films with female leads such as High Tide at Noon, arguing "I think the love story is back and women fans would appreciate a change from the male dominated picture."

His assistant for many years was Michael Stanley-Evans.

== Impact ==
Producer Betty Box called St. John "a wonderful old drunk. He got locked into some cellars over one weekend. He was quite happy. It was a whole weekend. And he was a boy from Alabama. He was a real deep south American. He was huge. He was six foot six. And heavy and hand- some. He was a wonderful man. But he didn’t quite fit into the British filmmaking tradition." Anthony Havelock-Allan said "he did what [Rank chairman John] Davis told him to... nice man but not creative at all, not imaginative. He just did what he was told."

Sir John Davis later said St. John "was jolly good. As executive producer his function was to produce films - to get together the units to make them. He was both a creative influence and a facilitator, with a grasp of the technical side of making films, and he understood the creative atmosphere."

Clive Donner called him "a sweet man, great personality but pretty hopeless. He hadn't really much of a clue" citing the fact that St John thought Genevieve was hopeless based on a rough cut.

Frank Godwin, who worked with St John as assistant executive producer, called him "A lovely, charming man, a very warm hearted character and, above all, a great showman."

Michael Powell called him "John Davis' yes-men at Pinewood" adding:

Everybody in show business knew Earl St. John, but nobody but John Davis would have thought of putting him in charge of production at Britain's premiere studio... He made many friends in show business, and few enemies. One doesn't kick a dog, and Earl was like a great St. Bernard dog in his desire to please, in his size and shape, in his great, lined face, and in his anxiety to agree with the last speaker. He puzzled artists with whom he had to work. Nobody disliked him, but nobody trusted him either. To put such a man — or such a dog — in charge of creative artists was a joke, or a crime, or both. To call such a man a has-been was a mistake. He had never been; he had just been around.

Contemporary historical consensus is that St. John's influence was limited, and he mainly did what Davis told him to do.

Roy Ward Baker later said "Earl was not [Daryl F. Zanuck. He was not a positive leader and ruthless driver if need be like Zanuck at Fox. He had no organisation to support him to speak of. He had a story department, dreamy, quite charming but dreamy... He found himself in charge of the studio and did his best to be in charge of the studio, he liked being in charge of the studio but he wasn't really a super positive contributor like Zanuck was."

However, when Bryan Forbes ran EMI Films he said he was influenced by Earl St. John and would find "myself thinking, 'How would Earl have handled this situation?'". He called him:

That enigmatic quasi-Englishman who convinced most strangers that he was a distinguished member of the aristocracy, whereas his apparent title sprang from the same line as Duke Ellington and King Vidor. Earl was a survivor. Frequently out of favour with the higher echelons, he stepped into the wings on several occasions to allow more flashy luminaries to occupy the stage. And when they departed to scant applause, as depart they inevitably did, there was Earl, unruffled and word perfect, to resume a familiar role. I certainly owe him more than one debt of gratitude, for in later years he gave me my first chance at direction. And when eventually I occupied a similar position at EMI, I often found myself thinking, how would Earl have handled this situation? He loved films, even bad films, and now when the industry is mostly in the control of men who treat films as just another commodity... one realizes what a giant Earl was."

Earl St. John had an at times difficult relationship with Dirk Bogarde but he cast Bogarde in Doctor in the House, which made him a big star, and suggested him for the lead in Victim.

Val Guest recalled "it was a bit disturbing at first, when you went to see Earl he was always in his office in full make-up. He used to wear pancake all the time."

Filmink magazine argued "possibly, Earl St John made a greater contribution to Rank (and British cinema) than is commonly realised... he still would have inevitably wielded considerable influence" and he "seems to have been universally liked, though not necessarily respected." The magazine went on to say:

St John was an unusual mogul. It can’t have been easy running Rank with John Davis lurking about... Still, under St John, Rank managed to turn out some popular comedies and war films, did try to expand its range, and some of its films were very good. St John’s record is… okay. He was not the executive that Rank really needed – which was someone like Ted Black... But then it was unlikely that Ted Black would have survived at Rank under Davis. And St John had a far better strike rate than the heads of production at Rank who followed him such as Freddie Thomas and Tony Williams.

== Later years ==
St. John had bought the film rights to the novel Saturday Night and Sunday Morning but the Rank board refused to let him make the film, which became a big success. He also refused to make a film of Look Back in Anger and cancelled Anthony Asquith's Lawrence of Arabia shortly before filming was to commence. Filmink called Rank's movies "famously timid" but "the odd gutsy movie did sneak through".

In August 1960 St John announced Rank would make fifteen films that year, down from his peak of 55 a year. "About a third will be comedies," he said. "The remainder will be dramas - some of them more frankly adult than we have ever attempted before. We must move with the times."

In January 1961 St John announced Rank would make fourteen films for the year at a cost of £2.5 million, "films with contemporary subjects suitable for a world market. All these films will be made with good taste and there will be no sensationalism." He added, "Too much violence is driving women out of the cinema." The risker Rank films from this time included No Love for Johnny and Victim.

In February 1962 St John declared "for the first time in my memory British films are beginning to click in America." Rank were investing large amounts in projects such as Tiara Tahiti, Waltz of the Toreadors and 55 Days at Peking. "A couple of years ago we never should have dreamed that high," said St John.

In February 1964 Rank announced it would make eight films at a cost of £4.5 million, including:

- Almost a Hero with Norman Wisdom
- Doctor in Clover
- Love on the Riviera with James Robertson Justice and Leslie Philips
- The Innocent Gunman from the novel by Jean Paul Lecroix
- The High Bright Sun
- The Lonely from the novel by Paul Gallico (never made)
- The Female of the Species (which became Deadlier Than the Male)
- The Unknown Battle (which became The Heroes of Telemark).

St. John retired in June 1964, after The High Bright Sun (1964), the last collaboration between Ralph Thomas, Betty Box and Dirk Bogarde. Freddie Thomas became managing director of Rank.

St John died while on vacation in Torremolinos, Spain, survived by his wife whom he married in 1946.

== Some film productions ==
- Tottie True (1948)
- The Rocking Horse Winner (1949)
- The Woman in Question (1950)
- Highly Dangerous (1950)
- The Reluctant Widow (1950)
- Prelude to Fame (1950)
- They Were Not Divided (1950)
- The Browning Version (1951)
- Encore (1951)
- Made in Heaven (1952)
- The Planter's Wife (1952) (a.k.a. Outpost in Malaya)
- The Venetian Bird (1952) (a.k.a. The Assassin)
- It Started in Paradise (1952)
- The Importance of Being Earnest (1952)
- The Card (1952) (a.k.a. The Promoter)
- Hunted (1952)
- Penny Princess (1952)
- The Long Memory (1953)
- Trouble in Store (1953)
- Personal Affair (1953)
- The Net (1953) (a.k.a. Project M7)
- The Final Test (1953)
- The Malta Story (1953)
- Always a Bride (1953)
- Desperate Moment (1953)
- A Day to Remember (1953)
- Genevieve (1953)
- You Know What Sailors Are! (1953)
- Turn the Key Softly (1953)
- The Kidnappers (1953) (a.k.a. The Little Kidnappers)
- The Million Pound Note (1954) (a.k.a. Man with a Million)
- Mad About Men (1954)
- Romeo and Juliet (1954)
- The Beachcomber (1954)
- The Seekers (1954) (a.k.a. Land of Fury)
- Forbidden Cargo (1954)
- Man with a Million (1954)
- The Purple Plain (1954)
- To Paris with Love (1954)
- Doctor in the House (1954)
- The Young Lovers (1954)
- As Long As They're Happy (1955)
- Man of the Moment (1955)
- Above Us the Waves (1955)
- The Woman for Joe (1955)
- All for Mary (1955)
- Value for Money (1955)
- Simba (1955)
- Passage Home (1955)
- One Good Turn (1955)
- Simon and Laura (1955)
- Doctor at Sea (1955)
- An Alligator Named Daisy (1955)
- Tears for Simon (1956) (a.k.a. Lost)
- House of Secrets (1956)
- Jumping for Joy (1956)
- The Black Tent (1956)
- Jacqueline (1956)
- Eyewitness (1956)
- The Secret Place (1956)
- A Town Like Alice (1956)
- Checkpoint (1956)
- The Spanish Gardener (1956)
- Up in the World (1956)
- The Battle of the River Plate (1956)
- The One That Got Away (1957)
- Ill Met by Moonlight (1957)
- Miracle in Soho (1957)
- Hell Drivers (1957)
- High Tide at Noon (1957)
- True as a Turtle (1957)
- Doctor at Large (1957)
- Campbell's Kingdom (1957)
- Seven Thunders (1957)
- Windom's Way (1957)
- Just My Luck (1957)
- Robbery Under Arms (1957)
- Dangerous Exile (1957)
- Rockets Galore (1957)
- Across the Bridge (1957)
- The Square Peg (1958)
- The Captain's Table (1958)
- Innocent Sinners (1958)
- Sea Fury (1958)
- The Violent Playground (1958)
- A Tale of Two Cities (1958)
- The Gypsy and the Gentleman (1958)
- A Night to Remember (1958)
- Carve Her Name with Pride (1958)
- Nor the Moon by Night (1958) (a.k.a. Elephant Gun)
- Floods of Fear (1958)
- Storm Over Jamaica (1958) (a.k.a. Passionate Summer)
- The Wind Cannot Read (1958)
- The 39 Steps (1958)
- Northwest Frontier (1959)
- Operation Amsterdam (1959)
- Too Many Crooks (1959)
- The Heart of a Man (1959)
- Ferry to Hong Kong (1959)
- Sapphire (1959)
- Upstairs and Downstairs (1959)
- Interpol Calling (1959) (TV series)
- Follow a Star (1959)
- Make Mine Mink (1960)
- Doctor in Love (1960)
- Conspiracy of Hearts (1960)
- The Bulldog Breed (1960)
- No Love for Johnnie (1960)
- No, My Darling Daughter (1961)
- The Singer Not the Song (1961)
- Flame in the Streets (1961)
- In the Doghouse (1962)
- On the Beat (1962)
- Tiara Tahiti (1962)
- The Wild and the Willing (1962)
- A Pair of Briefs (1962)
- A Stitch in Time (1963)
- 80,000 Suspects (1963)
- The Informers (1963)
- Doctor in Distress (1963)
- Hot Enough for June (1964)
- The Beauty Jungle (1964) (a.k.a. Contest Girl)
- The High Bright Sun (1965)

== Notes ==
- Harper, Sue; Porter, Vincent (2003). British cinema of the 1950s : the decline of deference.
