= Venetian Bird =

- Directed by: Ralph Thomas
- Written by: Victor Canning
- Based on: Venetian Bird by Victor Canning
- Produced by: Betty Box; Earl St. John
- Starring: Richard Todd; Eva Bartok; John Gregson
- Cinematography: Ernest Steward
- Edited by: Gerald Thomas
- Music by: Nino Rota
- Production company: British Film-Makers
- Distributed by: General Film Distributors
- Release date: 3 November 1952
- Running time: 95 minutes
- Country: United Kingdom
- Language: English
- Box office: £80,000

Venetian Bird (U.S. title The Assassin) is a 1952 British thriller film directed by Ralph Thomas and starring Richard Todd, Eva Bartok and John Gregson. The screenplay was adapted by Victor Canning from his 1950 novel of the same title. It was released in America by United Artists.

== Plot ==
British private detective Edward Mercer is employed to travel to Venice and locate an Italian who is to be rewarded for his assistance to an Allied airman during the Second World War. Once he arrives in Italy, however, he becomes mixed up in an assassination plot enveloped in a great deal of mystery. Central to it is whether Renzo Uccello actually died a few years earlier in World War II or not.

== Cast ==
- Richard Todd as Edward Mercer
- Eva Bartok as Adriana Medova
- John Gregson as Renzo Uccello
- George Coulouris as Chief of Police Spadoni
- Margot Grahame as Rosa Melitus
- David Hurst as Minelli
- Walter Rilla as Count Boria
- John Bailey as Lieutenant Longo
- Sid James as Bernardo
- Martin Boddey as Gufo
- Michael Balfour as Moretto
- Sydney Tafler as Boldesca
- Miles Malleson as Grespi
- Eric Pohlmann as Gostini
- Raymond Young as Luigi
- Ferdy Mayne as Tio
- Jill Clifford as Renata
- Eileen Way as woman detective
- Toni Lucarda as Nerva
- Janice Kane as Ninetta
- Meier Tzelniker as Mayor of Mirave

== Production ==
The film was made through British Film-Makers, a short lived production scheme that operated in Britain in the early 1950s as a co operative venture between the Rank Organisation and the National Film Finance Corporation (NFFC). Its nominal capital was divided between General Film Distributors (GFD) (Rank’s distribution company) and the NFFC. Earl St John represented Rank, James Lawrie (managing director of the NFFC) represented the NFFC while Sir Michael Balcon was chairman. Ralph Thomas and Betty Box had just made Appointment with Venus through BFM.

Michael Balcon initially rejected the idea of a film based on Victor Canning's novel because it was set in Italy and dealt with Italians, not Britons. Betty Box appealed to Earl St John, who overruled Balcon. Italian censors required that the script clarify the political struggles in post-war Venice that were portrayed in the novel.

Richard Todd was borrowed from Associated British who had the actor under contract. He says Gina Lollobrigida wanted to make the movie but her English was not then good enough. He recalled "I had enjoyed working on it, particularly with the exuberant Ralph Thomas as director. He was always ready to see the funny side of things."

Filming started March 1952. It was shot at Pinewood Studios over three weeks and on location in Venice over five weeks. The film's sets were designed by the art director George Provis.

Box and Thomas decided not to use colour shooting the film as they felt that it would not suit the genre.

John Gregson's performance led to him being offered a long-term contract by Earl St John at Rank.

== Reception ==
=== Box office ===
According to Rank's internal records the film did poorly at the box office.

=== Critical ===
Variety called it "a pedestrian meller with an implausible plot."

The Monthly Film Bulletin wrote: "Victor Canning has adapted the screenplay from his novel of the same name. He follows his original closely, and the result is a thriller which in approach derives something from The Third Man. But in approach only; the plot, and the handling of it, is mostly confused and heayy-going. The photography of the piazze and streets of Venice is quite striking, and alternates effectively with indoor scenes, ranging from a gallery of wax figures in costume to a highly mechanised glass works. At times, however, there is a tendency to clear the stage of all but the principals and to assume that the population remains impervious to the noise of fighting. Eva Bartok makes of her part a little more than just the normal go-between of crime fiction, while John Gregson is a sly but attractive scoundrel, Richard Todd, however, only partly succeeds in combining his role of self-effacing private detective with that of a spectacular hero."

Kine Weekly wrote: "Colourful and unusual romantic crime melodrama, actually staged in post-war Venice. ... The plot is not too easy to follow, but the types are interesting and sinister atmosphere is cleverly conveyed through brilliant camera work. Very good thriller, particularly for the 'upper crust.' ... The picture spares no expense to create realism, but the use of foreign tongues occasionally complicates story development. Its highspots, staged on a canal and in a glass factory and a museum, are, however, artfully spaced and keep its bizarre surface action reasonably taut. Richard Todd lacks essential dash as Mercer, but Eva Bartok makes a compelling and striking Adriana."

Picturegoer wrote: "Here is a confused and none-too-credible conversation piece, with colourful backgrounds, but commonplace plot. And the disappointment is not only in the structure of the picture. Even in the few chances that come his way, Todd acts in a stilted, emotionally limited way. ... Eva Bartok, as the 'hero's' wife, acts gracefully."

Filmink called it "a not-very-good attempt... to use The Third Man formula – like that film, it was based on a novel by an acclaimed thriller writer (in this case, Victor Canning) about a man (Richard Todd) who travels to an exotic foreign city (Venice) and deals with a mysterious beauty (Eva Bartok) while searching for a mystery man (John Gregson)."

In The Radio Times Guide to Films David Parkinson gave the film 2/5 stars, writing: "Borrowing liberally from The Third Man, this is a tolerable time-passer, although a little lightweight in the suspense department. Director Ralph Thomas offers some pretty postcard views of Venice, but he only fully exploits his fascinating location during the ingenious final chase sequence, which culminates in a Hitchcockian use of a famous landmark. Richard Todd is below par as the detective."
