= British Film-Makers =

1950s film production scheme

British Film-Makers (BFM) was a short lived production scheme that operated in Britain in the early 1950s as a co operative venture between the Rank Organisation and the National Film Finance Corporation (NFFC). Its notable films included The Card (1952) and The Malta Story (1953).

== Background ==
BFM was formed in January 1951. Its nominal capital was divided between General Film Distributors (GFD) (Rank’s distribution company) and the NFFC. Earl St John represented Rank, James Lawrie (managing director of the NFFC) represented the NFFC while Sir Michael Balcon was chairman BFM was one of three production groups involving the NFFC and all operated under similar lines - the others were Elstree Group and Group 3 Films.

GFD would distribute and guarantee 70% of finance, with the NFFC to provide the balance. Each producer/director team was, in theory, given artistic freedom. They received a fixed annual production fee to enable them to carry out the preparatory work, which was absorbed into the budget of their film. In practice, Rank frequently exerted creative control over the films.

The producers associated with BFM included Betty E. Box, Ronald Neame, Anthony Asquith, Anthony Havelock-Allan, Paul Soskin and Thorold Dickinson. They were expected to make six films a year.

== Productions ==
In February 1952 Earl St John announced the company would make a slate of 12 movies at a cost of £1,500,000, including Fanfare for Fig Leaves with Kay Kendall and Ian Hunter (this became It Started in Paradise), Tonight at 8:30 with Ted Ray (which became Meet Me Tonight), and The Planter's Wife.

The first film funded under the scheme was Appointment with Venus.

Over eighteen months, BFM financed fourteen films, six produced by BFM alone with the remaining eight being co-productions with independent producers. Filmink wrote "it's a little odd there were so many thrillers".

Rank pulled out of the BFM scheme at the end of 1952, claiming it wanted to be "free and independent". This led to the formation of Group Film Productions, a company which became Rank's main producing arm.

According to Rank's biographer:

It [British Film Makers] wasn’t a particularly happy experiment: few of the producer/director teams got on particularly well, and they all resented their contractual obligation to plough any profits they made straight into a central kitty. Nonetheless, as [John] Davis later observed, without the NFFC, ‘there would have been a complete financial collapse of British production’: for all its bureaucratic shortcomings, the NFFC enabled Rank to keep on making pictures, and by 1952 the organization was confident enough to embark on a production programme without this government crutch.

When Rank closed down BFM, the NFFC had recouped only £140,000 of its £706,000 advance although by 31 March 1957, the NFFC’s losses were just £144,339.

According to Sue Harper and Vince Porter, Rank "made a handsome profit on its investment in BFM. Moreover, it afforded [John] Davis and St John the opportunity of selecting their own creative teams and projecting a new image of social reality." Filmink argued:

It offers a possible model on how to make a diverse, broad-appeal local film industry in a smaller country. Namely: put key producing-directing teams under contract so they can pay their living costs while they develop projects; keep budgets reasonable; finance films through a combination of money from government and industry; underpin that industry money with a specific levy on tickets; ensure cinema chains have a say in what is made so they can get behind it. This isn’t the perfect model, but it’s not a bad one.

Rank revived the scheme in the mid 1960s making six films co-financed with the NFFC.

== Films ==
- Appointment with Venus (Oct 1951) - directed by Ralph Thomas, produced by Betty Box
- High Treason (Nov 1951) - co production with Conqueror Productions - directed by Roy Boulting, produced by Paul Soskin
- The Card (Feb 1952) - directed by Ronald Neame
- Hunted (March 1952) - co-p with Independent Artists - directed by Charles Crichton, produced by Julian Wintle
- The Importance of Being Earnest (June 1952) - co-p with Javelin - directed by Anthony Asquith, produced by Teddy Baird
- Meet Me Tonight (Sept 1952) - directed by Anthony Pelissier, produced by Anthony Havelock-Allan
- It Started in Paradise (Oct 1952) - directed by Compton Bennett, produced by Leslie Parkyn
- The Venetian Bird (Nov 1952) - directed by Ralph Thomas, produced by Betty Box
- Made in Heaven (Nov 1952) - Fanfare Productions - directed by John Paddy Carstairs, produced by George H. Brown
- Something Money Can't Buy (July 1952) - Vic Productions - directed by Pat Jackson, produced by Joseph Janni
- The Long Memory (Jan 1953) - Europa Productions - directed by Robert Hamer, produced by Hugh Stewart
- Desperate Moment (March 1953) - Fanfare Productions - directed by Compton Bennett, produced by George H. Brown
- Top of the Form (March 1953) - directed by John Paddy Carstairs, produced by Paul Soskin
- The Malta Story (June 1953) - Theta Productions - directed by Brian Desmond Hurst, produced by Peter De Sarigny

== Notes ==
- Harper, Sue; Porter, Vincent (2003). British cinema of the 1950s : the decline of deference. Oxford University Press.
