= The End of the Road (1954 film) =

1954 British film by Wolf Rilla

- Opening titles
- Directed by: Wolf Rilla
- Written by: James Forsyth; Geoffrey Orme
- Produced by: Alfred Shaughnessy
- Starring: Finlay Currie; Duncan Lamont; Naomi Chance
- Cinematography: Arthur Grant
- Edited by: Bernard Gribble
- Music by: John Addison
- Production company: Group Three Films
- Distributed by: British Lion Films
- Release date: 15 November 1954
- Running time: 76 minutes
- Country: United Kingdom
- Language: English

The End of the Road is a 1954 British second feature ('B') drama film directed by Wolf Rilla and starring Finlay Currie, Duncan Lamont and Naomi Chance. It was written by James Forsyth and Geoffrey Orme, and produced by Group Three Films with funding from the National Film Finance Corporation, and distributed by British Lion.

== Plot ==
Mick-Mack, a veteran employee at the Jericho Works strongly resists when he has retirement forced upon him by his employers. He says he will retire when he is 90. All he has to show is a small clock as a retirement present which he places on the family mantelpiece. After retirement he takes a job as night watchman at the works. The employers decide that only Mick-Mack can resolve the troubles they are having in the electroplating section. He discovers it is drops of honey, from bees in the roof, which are ruining the process.

== Cast ==
- Finlay Currie as Mick MacAulay, old 'Mick-Mack'
- Duncan Lamont as Barney
- Naomi Chance as Molly
- Edward Chapman as works manager
- Hilda Fenemore as Madge
- George Merritt as timekeeper
- Gordon Whiting as young Kennie
- David Hannaford as Barney Wee
- Eugene Leahy as old worker
- Edie Martin as Gloomy Gertie
- Pauline Winter as personnel manager
- Michael Bird as builder
- Anthony Kilshawe as manager
- Kenneth Henry as Labour Exchange clerk
- Herbert C. Walton as first old man
- Claude Bonser as second old man
- Sam Kydd as first postal clerk
- Hugh Munro as second postal clerk
- Bert Simms as crane driver
- John Baker as foreman
- Ewen Solon as policeman
- Edward Malin as nightwatchman

== Production ==
It was made at Beaconsfield Studios with sets designed by the art director Michael Stringer.

== Critical reception ==
The Monthly Film Bulletin wrote: "The End of the Road begins as if it were a serious study of old age, and its difficulties when spirit and energy do not diminish with years. The problem is satisfactorily posed; Finlay Currie's dignified and accomplished performance carries off awkward moments such as the improbable scene Mick-Mack makes when he is presented with a retiring gift. The stock working-class husband and wife of Duncant Lamont and Naomi Chance are sufficiently good to support the impression of Mick-Mack's difficulties at home. But after this lengthy and quite satisfactory exposition, the film deteriorates into over-wrought scenes of the old man's wanderings of mind and body; and finally to a wholly artificial solution and a conventional, unlikely happy ending."

In British Sound Films: The Studio Years 1928–1959 David Quinlan rated the film as "good", writing: "interesting study of the problems of old age."

The film historians Steve Chibnall and Brian McFarlane note that The End of the Road was "rightly praised" at the time of its release by Kinematograph Weekly as "provocative and purposeful entertainment", and they add that it is "characterised by a real feeling for cramped working-class life and for the gap left when suddenly one is no longer required to be anywhere on a regular basis".
