= Windom's Way =

- Original trade ad
- Directed by: Ronald Neame
- Written by: Jill Craigie
- Based on: novel by James Ramsey Ullman
- Produced by: John Bryan; John Hawkesworth executive Earl St. John
- Starring: Peter Finch; Mary Ure
- Cinematography: Christopher Challis
- Edited by: Reginald Mills
- Music by: James Bernard
- Production company: Rank Organisation Film Productions
- Distributed by: Rank Organisation
- Release dates: December 1957 (UK); October 1958 (US)
- Running time: 108 min.
- Country: United Kingdom
- Language: English

Windom's Way is a 1957 British thriller film directed by Ronald Neame and starring Peter Finch and Mary Ure. Made in Eastman Color, it is set during the Malayan Emergency. Neame said it "wasn’t a very good film."

== Plot ==
Dr Alec Windom is a British doctor who works in a village in Malaya. He is visited by his estranged wife Lee. Alec is drawn in to a conflict between the local villagers and the white rubber plantation owner. Alec tries to keep the peace but the situation erupts into violence.

== Cast ==
=== Main cast ===
- Peter Finch as Alec Windom
- Mary Ure as Lee Windom
- Natasha Parry as Anna Vidal
- Robert Flemyng as Colonel George Hasbrook
- Michael Hordern as Patterson
- Grégoire Aslan as Mayor Lollivar

=== Supporting cast ===
- John Cairney as Jan Vidal
- Marne Maitland as Commissioner Belhedron
- George Margo as Police Officer Lansang
- Kurt Siegenberg as Kosti

=== Cameo/Uncredited cast ===
- Martin Benson as Samcar, Rebel Commander
- Sanny Bin Hussan as Father Amyan
- Burt Kwouk as Father Amyan's Aide
- Olaf Pooley as Colonel Lupat
- John A. Tinn as Patrol Leader

== Original novel ==
The film was based on a 1952 novel by James Ramsey Ullman, which was reportedly inspired by Dr. Gordon S. Seagrave, who was imprisoned for allegedly helping the Karen people. The novel was set in the fictitious island state of Papaan.

Ullman says he wanted to tell the story how "in between man – call him the liberal – can get caught between the rollers of fanaticism or authoritarianism on either side; the case of a man trying to do his job and be a human being among other human beings and how hard this is in the twentieth century." Ullman admitted the story of Seagrove "was somewhere in the back of my mind" when he wrote the book.

The book was a Literary Guild choice and became a best seller in the US.

The Guardian called it "sympathetic and readable."

Ullman wrote a first draft of a play based on the book.

== Production ==
Film rights to Windom's Way were bought by Carl Foreman, who wrote the script. He sold the rights to this and two other properties to Earl St John of Rank Film Productions, who in January 1955 announced it as part of its schedule for that year (but it would not be made for another two years). The company was making an increasing amount of movies overseas at the time to combat the threat of television.

The script was rewritten and 'Anglicized' by Anthony Perry. Perry's draft was considered too "political" and was rewritten by Jill Craigie to be softened. However, the resulting work was considerably more left-wing than Rank's other colonial war films of this time such as The Planter's Wife and Simba.

Ronald Neame had just left The Seventh Sin (1957) during production. He was contacted by his old producing partner John Bryan who suggested Neame make Windom's Way with Peter Finch.

Finch made the film immediately after returning from Australia where he made Robbery Under Arms. Part of the location shoot took place in Corsica in May 1957 for three weeks. The rest was filmed at Pinewood.

It was Mary Ure's first movie under her contract with Rank. Best known for the play Look Back in Anger she had been under contract to Alex Korda, and after he died her contract transferred to Rank. She kept turning down scripts, saying "The trouble is the British film industry doesn't have enough good writers." However she agreed to make Windom's Way. After finishing the film she married John Osborne and went to American to perform Look Back in Anger on Broadway.

Neame says Corsica was a "difficult location".

== Reception ==
=== Box Office ===
"It was not a successful picture, I'm afraid", said Neame later. "I think it fell between two stools, neither politically profound nor exciting enough as an action film. John just liked the book very much and I would have directed anything to get back to the studios again."

"The finished film may have had too many messages for people to stay interested", Neame later wrote. "It was neither a hit nor a disgrace."

=== Critical ===
Variety called it "a slowish but well-made intelligent drama". The Evening Standard called it "only half as good as its intentions... It could have been important. In fact, it is less bold than last year's headlines." The Guardian praised the acting and scenery "but they are not enough to save this worthy and sometimes exciting British film from foundering in incoherence... the message becomes hopelessly muddled."

The New York Times said the film was "without any topical teeth" in which Windom's "political sympathies, like the geography, are so vague that one need have no fear of being subverted by associating with him in this film. All one needs to worry about, precisely, is being a little provoked and bored."

Filmink argued "it lacked the focus of The Planter’s Wife or Simba – those were pro-white settler action/adventure tales, Windom’s Way was more of a pro-white marital drama with a little bit of action and a little bit of politics. It’s actually a really interesting, complex movie that tries to be quality with some strong performances."

=== Awards ===
The film was nominated for four British Academy of Film and Television Arts awards in 1958.

== Bibliography ==
- Neame, Ronald (2003). Straight from the Horse's Mouth. The Scarecrow Press, Inc.
