= Top of the Form =

Top of the Form may refer to:

- Top of the Form (quiz show), a BBC radio and television quiz show for secondary school students 1948 to 1986
- Top of the Form (film), a 1953 British comedy starring Ronald Shiner
