= The Planter's Wife (1952 film) =

- Original British film poster
- Directed by: Ken Annakin
- Written by: Guy Elmes; Peter Proud
- Based on: novel Planter's Wife by Sidney Charles George
- Produced by: John Stafford
- Starring: Claudette Colbert; Jack Hawkins; Anthony Steel; Ram Gopal
- Cinematography: Geoffrey Unsworth
- Edited by: Alfred Roome
- Music by: Allan Gray
- Production company: Pinnacle Productions
- Distributed by: General Film Distributors; United Artists (US)
- Release dates: 18 September 1952 (UK); 26 November 1952 (US)
- Running time: 88 minutes
- Country: United Kingdom
- Language: English
- Box office: $509,000 (UK) $90,000 (US)

The Planter's Wife is a 1952 British war drama film directed by Ken Annakin, and starring Claudette Colbert, Jack Hawkins and Anthony Steel. It is set against the backdrop of the Malayan Emergency and focuses on rubber planter Jim Frazer and his neighbours who are fending off a campaign of sustained attacks by Communist insurgents while also struggling to save his marriage. The film was retitled Outpost in Malaya in the United States.

== Plot ==
During the Malayan Emergency, communist terrorists attack an isolated rubber plantation, killing the manager. This concerns neighbouring planter Jim Frazer, who is struggling to produce rubber under constant attacks. Jim is having domestic difficulties with his American wife Liz, who is planning to take their son Mike to England and not return. British Inspector Hugh Dobson urges Liz to come clean with Jim.

Jim gives a lift to Wan Li, a Chinese man, the uncle of a little servant girl injured in the attack on Jim's neighbour. After Wan Li goes to the police, the communists murder him. Mike is almost bitten by a cobra but a mongoose kills the snake.

A bandit attacks Liz and corners her, but she shoots him with a pistol. Jim takes her home. When she awakes the plantation is under attack. Jim fights off the communists with the help of his friend Nair. Liz decides to stay in Malaya.

== Cast ==
- Claudette Colbert as Liz Frazer
- Jack Hawkins as Jim Frazer
- Anthony Steel as Hugh Dobson
- Ram Gopal as Nair
- Jeremy Spenser as Mat
- Peter Asher as Mike Frazer
- Tom Macaulay as Jack Bushell
- Sonya Hana as Ah Mov
- Andy Ho as Wan Li
- Yah Ming as Ah Siong
- Ng Cheuk Kwong as Ho Tang
- Shaym Bahadur as Putra (uncredited)
- Alfie Bass as soldier (uncredited)
- Bryan Coleman as Captain Dell (uncredited)
- Helen Goss as Eleanor Bushell (uncredited)
- Victor Maddern as radio operator (uncredited)
- Don Sharp as Lieutenant Summers (uncredited)
- Bill Travers as Planter (uncredited)

== Production ==
=== Development ===
The movie was based on a 1951 novel Planter's Wife by Sidney Charles George. It was originally known as White Blood. This was the name given to liquid rubber as it is tapped from trees. However the title was criticised by the Colonial Office and overseas distributors because it could be interpreted as referring to racial discrimination, so it was changed to The Planter's Wife.

The film was co-financed by the National Film Finance Corporation and The Rank Organisation. The producer, John Stafford, was freelance. A script was written by Guy Elmes, who had served in the Far East with Lord Mountbatten. Rank's head of production, Earl St. John gave the script to Ken Annakin who agreed to direct.

In February 1952 Earl St. John of Rank announced the company (in conjunction with the National Film Fince Corporation) would make a slate of 12 movies at a cost of £1,500,000, including Fanfare for Fig Leaves with Kay Kendall, Tonight at 8:30, and The Planter's Wife.

=== Casting ===
To encourage a receptive American audience, Earl St. John sent Annakin to Hollywood in November 1951 to select an American actress for the female lead Liz Frazer. Annakin interviewed Norma Shearer, Loretta Young, Joan Crawford, Olivia de Havilland and Claudette Colbert. Shearer was retired, de Havilland and Young were too busy with other commitments and Crawford thought the role would not suit her. However Colbert accepted. She was paid £20,000 to play the lead. Colbert's casting meant United Artists agreed to distribute the film in the US.

The role of Jim Frazer was originally meant to be played by Michael Redgrave but in December 1951 Jack Hawkins was cast instead. In January 1952, Anthony Steel joined the cast; it was one of several films where he played in support of an older British actor.

Indian dancer Ram Gopal was given his first dramatic role as the overseer Nair. Child actor Peter Asher – who later went on to a successful career as musician, singer (as half of the 1960s' Peter and Gordon duo) and record producer – plays Jim and Liz's son, Mike. Among the Burmese, Indian and Malay extras was Khin Maung, a noted Burmese painter.

Future director Don Sharp has a small role.

=== Shooting ===
Colbert left for Britain in February 1951 and stayed there three months.

Director Annakin and a team gathered anecdotes from planters, policemen and soldiers in Malaya and shot second unit sequences there as well as Singapore and Malacca but for safety reasons during the ongoing Malayan Emergency, much of the filming was done in Ceylon, on the advice of Rank's Asian representative, John Dalton. Filming in Ceylon took eight weeks. The majority of the film was shot in London at Pinewood Studios. Hawkins wrote in his memoirs, "we did not leave Pinewood Studios for one single day. All the outside work was done with that rather cheating technique of back projection, by which the action is played out against a screen showing moving pictures of locations... What made it all the more absurd was the fact that we were filming in the middle of winter, and dressed only in bush shirt and shorts I was permanently frozen."

Colbert impressed Annakin with her detailed technical knowledge of lighting and camera work and confided in Annakin that she had never been called upon to do real action scenes in Hollywood and quickly became adept in small arms use. Annakin says Colbert had an affair with actor Hubert Gregg while making the movie.

To shoot the cobra vs mongoose fight, the room set was built in a Ceylon zoo. When several of the local mongooses ran away from the cobra, the zookeeper said "Ï'm afraid our Singhalese mongooses are not used to fighting; I'll have to get you some North-Indian variety". Imported from Madras, the Indian mongoose engaged in a true fight to the finish with the cobra.

== Reception ==
=== Box office ===
The film was the sixth most popular movie of the year at the British box office in 1952, after The Greatest Show on Earth, Where No Vultures Fly, Son of Paleface, Ivanhoe and Mandy. It was followed by The Quiet Man, The World in His Arms, Angels One Five (also with Hawkins), Reluctant Heroes, The African Queen and The Sound Barrier.

Despite Colbert's presence, the film only took £32,000 in the United States. (Variety reported this at $90,000.) However it was a success in other international markets.

=== Critical ===
The critic from the Daily Worker called it "the most viciously dishonest war propaganda picture yet made in Britain."

The Los Angeles Times said "the atmosphere is more plausible than the melodrama."

Variety said "The jungle campaign against local terrorists is depicted against a commonplace domestic drama" and said "later action sequences compensate for the lame opening."

=== Legacy ===
Ken Annakin later said he was "quite proud" of the film calling it "a good action picture." The success of the movie led to Rank's head of production Earl St John to commission another colonial war film, about Britain's struggle against the Mau Mau, Simba.

== Citation ==
- Annakin, Ken (2001). So you wanna be a director?. Tomahawk Press. ISBN 978-0-9531926-5-6.
