= The Card (1952 film) =

1952 British film by Ronald Neame

- A poster bearing the film's American title: The Promoter
- Directed by: Ronald Neame
- Written by: Eric Ambler
- Based on: the novel The Card; 1911 novel by Arnold Bennett
- Produced by: John Bryan; Earl St. John; Bob McNaught
- Starring: Alec Guinness; Glynis Johns; Valerie Hobson; Petula Clark
- Cinematography: Oswald Morris
- Edited by: Clive Donner
- Music by: William Alwyn
- Color process: Black and white
- Production company: British Film-Makers
- Distributed by: General Film Distributors
- Release date: 25 February 1952
- Running time: 91 minutes
- Country: United Kingdom
- Language: English
- Box office: £163,000 (U.K.) or $476,000 (UK) $400,000 (U.S./Canada)

The Card is a 1952 British comedy film version of the 1911 novel by Arnold Bennett. In America, the film was titled The Promoter. It was adapted by Eric Ambler and directed by Ronald Neame. It stars Alec Guinness, Glynis Johns, Valerie Hobson, and Petula Clark. The film was nominated for the Academy Award for Best Sound. It is mainly faithful to the novel, omitting some minor incidents.

== Plot ==
The film follows the adventures and misadventures of Edward Henry (Denry) Machin, an ambitious young man from a poor background.

Denry surreptitiously changes his poor grades to qualify for entry to a "school for the sons of gentlemen". At the age of 16, he becomes a junior clerk to Mr. Duncalf, the town clerk and a solicitor. He meets the charming and socially well-connected Countess of Chell, a client of Duncalf's, and is given the job of sending out invitations to a grand municipal ball. He "invites" himself and wins a £5 bet that he will ask the countess to dance. This earns him the reputation of a "card" (a "character", someone able to set tongues wagging)—a reputation he is determined to cement, but the next day, Duncalf angrily sacks Denry.

Denry offers his services as a rent collector to a dissatisfied client of Duncalf's, Mrs. Codleyn. His reputation as an efficient and no-nonsense collector brings the business of Mr. Calvert. Denry quickly realises, though, that he can make more money by advancing loans, at a highly profitable interest rate, to the many tenants who are in arrears. He also discovers that Ruth Earp, the dancing teacher who is attracted to Denry, is herself heavily in arrears to Mr. Calvert. Despite this, Ruth and he became engaged.

While on holiday in Llandudno with Ruth (accompanied by her friend Nellie Cotterill as chaperone), he witnesses a shipwreck and the rescue of the sailors—an event that he turns to his financial advantage. He also realizes Ruth's spendthrift nature, and they part on bitter terms.

Denry starts up the Five Towns Universal Thrift Club, a bold venture that allows members to purchase goods on credit. This increases Denry's wealth and reputation, and he is able to expand further, due to the patronage of the countess.

Denry's social ambitions expand. He becomes a town councillor, and he purchases the rights to locally born Callear, the "greatest centre forward in England", for the failing local football club.

Ruth reappears, now the widow of a rich, older, titled man. He considers renewing their relationship but is unsure of his (and her) feelings.

Nellie's father, a builder, is bankrupt (again), and the family decides to migrate to Canada. As they are boarding the ocean liner at Liverpool, Denry realizes that Nellie is devastated at her potential loss, and that he really loves only her. Ruth, who is also present, is furious, but quickly starts a fresh relationship with another older, titled gentleman.

Nellie and Denry marry. Denry becomes the youngest mayor in the history of Bursley.

== Cast ==
- Alec Guinness as Denry Machin
- Glynis Johns as Ruth Earp
- Valerie Hobson as Countess of Chell
- Petula Clark as Nellie Cotterill
- Edward Chapman as Herbert Duncalf
- Veronica Turleigh as Mrs Machin
- George Devine as Herbert Calvert
- Joan Hickson as Mrs Codleyn
- Frank Pettingell as Police Superintendent
- Gibb McLaughlin as Emery
- Henry Edwards as Mr. Cotterill
- Alison Leggatt as Mrs. Cotterill
- Harold Goodwin as John
- Cameron Hall as Mr. Crain
- Ann Lancaster as Miriam
- Peter Copley as Shillitoe
- Lyn Evans as Cregeen
- Mark Daly as Mayor (uncredited)
- Deidre Doyle as Widow Hullins
- Frank Tickle as Mr. Bostock
- Norman MacOwan as Simeon
- Tom Gill as Miriam's Young Man
- Michael Trubshawe as Yeomanry Officer
- Michael Hordern as Bank Manager
- Wilfrid Hyde-White as Lord at Liverpool dock
- Brian Roper as Newsboy at Football Stadium
- Raymond Rollett as Works Bandmaster
- Ewen Solon as Bookstall Attendant

== Production ==
Ronald Neame was making The Magic Box at Elstree Studios when he looked at literary properties that Associated British had bought the movie rights for but never filmed. He was attracted to Arnold Bennett's The Card, believing "with the right actor playing Denry Machin, it would be a great project." He bought an option to the novel off Robert Clark of Associated British, hired Eric Ambler to write a script and asked John Bryan to produce. Earl St John of the Rank Organisation approached Neame asking if he had any projects and Neame presented The Card.

Neame said "there was only one actor" to play the lead and that was Guinness, who agreed. Neame also said he "bought it because I thought it was a perfect Guinness part."

The movie was financed through British Film-Makers, a short lived production scheme that operated in Britain in the early 1950s as a co operative venture between the Rank Organisation and the National Film Finance Corporation (NFFC).

The film was shot in August 1951. It was made at Pinewood Studios near London and on location. Location shooting took place largely in Burslem in Stoke-on-Trent, the basis for the fictional location of Bursley, and in the North Wales resort Llandudno. The football match was filmed at York Road, home of Maidenhead United FC.

For Guinness, playing the romantic lead was a departure from his previously comic roles. The film was one of the first adult screen roles for Clark, who received her first screen kiss. Clark recorded a vocal version of the film's theme, with lyrics by her long-term accompanist, Joe "Mr Piano" Henderson.

Neame recalled "it was one of the happiest pictures I worked on. We had a superb cast... they all just fell into place, all wanted to do it. They loved the idea of working with Alec and it was a very good script."

== Release ==
The film was launched in conjunction with an advertising campaign from Guinness beer.

== Reception ==
=== Box office ===
The film was a financial success in the UK and, less expectedly, the USA. This was attributed in part to the popularity of Guinness.

It was the most financially successful of all movies made through British Film-Makers.

=== Critical ===
Variety said "the principal character... provides a made-to-measure part for Alec Guinness. He brings all his skill and polish into play, and makes this British offering an attractive proposition for the home trade, although its success in America is likely to be more modest than some of the star’s more recent offerings."

A critic in The Manchester Guardian wrote that "Guinness appears to take only a perfunctory interest in 'Denry.' He plays him much too quietly", and that the film "never quite takes wings of fancy."

The New York Times critic Bosley Crowther gave the film a mixed review, writing "the script Eric Ambler has adapted from Arnold Bennett's old novel, The Card, is provokingly uninvested with dramatic compulsion or push. It just ambles along very gently from one situation to the next ... The Promoter, while vastly amusing in spots, is not a first-rate Guinness show."

In the New York Daily News, reviewer Kate Cameron called the film "delightfully amusing", awarding it three-and-a-half out of four stars.

Kenneth Tynan felt Guinness's "performance was full of cunning, a lively scamp with a crooked grin, but the film as a whole lacked substance." Pauline Kael called it " a blithe, wonderfully satisfying comedy. "

Guinness called it "a jolly nice film, full of life and liveliness and very well directed." However, in another interview he said "I never felt I was the right actor to play Denry in The Card. They should have had someone more obviously tougher. I think I treated it too lightly and I have never been happy playing parts too like myself."

== Bibliography ==
- Neame, Ronald (2003). Straight from the Horse's Mouth.
