= Maurice Cowan =

British writer and producer (1891–1974)

Maurice Cowan (1891–1974) was a British writer and producer. He produced the first films of Norman Wisdom. He disliked working with Wisdom so much on One Good Turn he vowed never to work with the comedian again.

He was editor of The Picture Goer when he came up with an idea for what became the film I Live in Grosvenor Square. He sent it to Herbert Wilcox would bought it.

== Select credits ==
- A Yank in London (1945) aka I Live in Grosvenor Square - story
- A Voice in the Night (1946) aka Wanted for Murder - add dialogue
- Springtime (1946) aka Spring Song - story
- Meet Me at Dawn (1947) - dialogue
- Murder on Monday (1952) aka Home at Seven - producer
- Derby Day (1952) - producer
- Turn the Key Softly (1953) - producer, writer
- Trouble in Store (1953) - producer, writer
- One Good Turn (1955) - producer, writer
- Man of the Moment (1955) - story
- Babes in the Wood on Ice (1956) - book
- The Gypsy and the Gentleman (1958) - producer
- Operation Amsterdam (1959) - producer
- The Men from Room 13 (1959–61) - research
- Watch It, Sailor! (1961) - producer
- The Six Wives of Henry VIII (1970) - series ideas
