= Shirley Abicair =

Australian and British performer (1928–2025)

- Born: Shirley Alice Abicair; 26 October 1928; Melbourne, Victoria, Australia
- Died: 27 September 2025 (aged 96); London, England
- Occupations: Singer, musician, actress, television personality, author
- Years active: 1946–1971
- Notable work: One Good Turn (film); Tales of Tumbarumba (book)

Shirley Alice Abicair (26 October 1928 – 27 September 2025) was an Australian and British singer, musician, television personality, actress and author. In the 1950s and 1960s, she was probably best known as an exponent of the zither.

== Early life and education ==
Abicair was born in Melbourne, Victoria, Australia, on 26 October 1928. She was the only daughter of a wing commander in the RAAF.

Abicair resided in Adelaide prior to pursuing studies at Sydney University, where she studied philosophy, languages and the arts, and sang in undergraduate revues.

== Career ==
While studying in Sydney, Abicair began singing at parties to support her studies, accompanying herself on the zither. Self-taught, she found the zither whilst rummaging in a cupboard as a small child. She entered and won a Sydney radio talent contest, which led to offers of engagements on radio and in theatre and cabaret.

In 1952, Abicair arrived in London with £2. She was photographed by a newspaper photographer who was looking for "pretty faces" while disembarking at London Airport. Her photo was spotted by a radio producer in the newspaper, and within weeks this led to her appearing on BBC Television. The same year, she had her own programme, in which she sang and played the zither. In December, she also appeared in the title role in the pantomime Cinderella with George Martin, the Casual Comedian, at the Empress Theatre in Brixton. The zither was, along with her Australian image, to become her trademark. She released her first record, "Careless Love", that year. In 1953, the Empire Theatre in Nottingham billed her as "TV's zither girl". In this period, she co-starred with comedian Norman Wisdom in the film One Good Turn (1955).

In 1956, Abicair recorded the title song for the soundtrack of the Australian film Smiley. It was produced by George Martin, later known for his work with the Beatles. On 26 March 1956, Abicair appeared on BBC TV's Off the Record. Through the middle to late 1950s she hosted (with help from her puppet friend, the Australian indigenous children Tea Cup and Clothespeg), a TV series called Children's Hour. In the process, she became an unofficial ambassador and promoter of Australia to a generation of British children. This Australian image was reinforced by her release of records with titles such as "(I Love You) Fair Dinkum" and "Botany Bay". Her rendering of the Australian folk song "Little Boy Fishin'", released in 1956, become a regular on the BBC's Children's Favourites request programme.

In 1959, she briefly returned to Australia to record a series of television documentary films she had conceived, based on Australian folk songs, entitled Shirley Abicair in Australia, for the Australian ABC TV network.

Abicair accepted a request to perform at the Variety Club of Great Britain eighth annual Star Gala at the Festival Gardens in Battersea Park, London, on 13 May 1961. In 1962, she toured the Soviet Union, and in the same year she gave a recital at the Festival Hall in London. Later that year, in October, she visited the United States for performances. 1962 also saw her children's book Tales of Tumbarumba published.

In June 1963, in the US, she appeared with the Smothers Brothers on Hootenanny and the panel game show To Tell the Truth, with Cicely Tyson, on 25 March 1963. In December, for ABC Australia, she appeared on Comedy Bandbox.

In 1965, Abicair's EP On the Nursery Beat was released. It was a number of nursery rhymes put to a Mersey beat. That year, she did a tour with British comedian Frankie Howerd to entertain the personnel of HMS Albion and 848 Naval Air Squadron at Sibu airfield, Malaysia, and other British forces stationed on the Malay Peninsula and in Sarawak, Borneo, during the unrest there. The tour was filmed and later released as the East of Howerd TV special. During 1966–67 she released a number of more mature songs on record, including her version of the Gerry Goffin–Carole King song "So Goes Love" and Paul Simon's "Flowers Never Bend with the Rainfall". She had previously, in the early 1960s, released three albums of folk songs.

Abicair and harmonica player Larry Adler entertained troops in Israel in 1967. The following year, they worked on a children's theatre show together. She began her own one-woman theatre show in 1969 at the Arts Theatre in London.

In 1971, Abicair moved to Oregon in the United States, where she appeared in a series of college concerts with the American writer Ken Kesey.

== Personal life and death ==
Abicair lived in Belgravia, London, dividing her time between Britain, the US and Australia.

She died in London after a short illness on 27 September 2025, aged 96. Abicair never married.

== See also ==
- Murray Sayle
- Gay Kindersley

== Bibliography ==
- Australian Encyclopaedia: Sixth Edition, Vol. 1, Australian Geographic (1996) ISBN 1-86276-014-4
- Shirley Abicair Sings Songs From Many Lands (1960), LP (Concert Hall CP 1265, 1960)
- Tales of Tumbarumba, London; Max Parrish (1962), illustrated by Margaret Cilento ASIN B0000CLK1E
