= The Importance of Being Earnest (1952 film) =

1952 film by Anthony Asquith

- Criterion Collection DVD cover
- Directed by: Anthony Asquith
- Screenplay by: Anthony Asquith
- Based on: The Importance of Being Earnest; 1895 play by Oscar Wilde
- Produced by: Teddy Baird
- Starring: Michael Redgrave; Michael Denison; Edith Evans; Joan Greenwood; Dorothy Tutin; Margaret Rutherford; Miles Malleson
- Cinematography: Desmond Dickinson
- Edited by: John D. Guthridge
- Music by: Benjamin Frankel
- Color process: Technicolor
- Production companies: Javelin Films; British Film-Makers
- Distributed by: General Film Distributors
- Release dates: 2 June 1952; (UK); 22 December 1952 (US)
- Running time: 95 minutes
- Country: United Kingdom
- Language: English
- Box office: £139,000

The Importance of Being Earnest is a 1952 British comedy drama film adaptation of the 1895 play by Oscar Wilde. It was directed by Anthony Asquith, who also adapted the screenplay, and was produced by Anthony Asquith, Teddy Baird, and Earl St. John.

== Plot ==
The story takes place on 14 February 1895. It is about two gentlemen pretending to be people other than themselves. Interwoven in their storylines are two romance-stricken ladies, each possessing an unusual allegiance to the manliness of the name Ernest. London man-about-town Jack Worthing, who hides behind the name Ernest, is an aristocrat from the country with uncertain lineage. His friend, Algernon Moncrieff, is of moderate means and has also created an imaginary character, Bunbury. Algernon's cousin, Gwendolen Fairfax, has caught the eye of Jack. Jack's ward in the country, Cecily Cardew, has caught the eye of Algernon. Lady Bracknell rules the roost with her heavy-handed social mores.

The story begins in London. Jack and Algy are discussing life and love. Both reveal to each other their imaginary characters, Ernest and Bunbury. Jack reveals that he is in love with Algy's cousin, Gwendolen, and Algy reveals that he is in love with Jack's ward, Cecily. Both gentlemen begin to scheme the pursuit of their love. At tea that afternoon, Jack and Gwendolen secretly reveal their love for one another. Gwendolen makes it known that her "ideal has always been to love someone by the name of Ernest." Jack fears she will find out his true identity. Lady Bracknell inquires as to Jack's pedigree. Jack confesses that he does not know who his parents are because, as a baby, he was found in a handbag in a cloakroom at Victoria Station. Lady Bracknell will not allow her daughter "— a girl brought up with the utmost care — to marry into a cloak-room, and form an alliance with a parcel."

At the manor house in the country, Cecily is daydreaming as her governess, Miss Prism, tries to teach her German. Uninvited, Algy arrives from London and assumes the role of Ernest. While Algy and Cecily are getting acquainted in the parlour, Jack arrives in black mourning clothes and informs Miss Prism that his brother, Ernest, is dead. When Algy and Cecily come out to see him, the sad news loses its believability as everyone now thinks Algy is Ernest. In pursuit of Jack, Gwendolen arrives from London and meets Cecily. They both discover that they are engaged to Ernest, not realising one is Jack and one is Algy. When the men arrive in the garden, the confusion is cleared up. The ladies are put off that neither one is engaged to someone named Ernest.

Lady Bracknell arrives by train. As everyone gathers in the drawing room, Lady Bracknell recognises Miss Prism as her late sister's baby's governess from twenty-eight years before. Miss Prism confesses that she inadvertently left the baby in her handbag at Victoria Station. Jack realised they are talking about him. He retrieves the handbag from his private room and shows Miss Prism. She acknowledges that the bag is hers. Lady Bracknell then tells Jack that he is her late sister's son and the older brother to Algy. Unable to ascertain who his father was, Jack looks in an Army journal, as his father was a general, and realises that his father's name was Ernest. Thus it becomes apparent that his real name is also Ernest – as Lady Bracknell says, being the eldest son, he must have been named after his father.

The film ends with Jack saying, "I've now realised for the first time in my life the vital importance of being earnest."

== Cast ==
- Michael Redgrave as John (Jack) Worthing
- Michael Denison as Algernon Moncrieff
- Edith Evans as Lady Bracknell
- Joan Greenwood as Gwendolen Fairfax
- Margaret Rutherford as Miss Prism
- Miles Malleson as Canon Chasuble
- Dorothy Tutin as Cecily Cardew
- Aubrey Mather as Merriman
- Walter Hudd as Lane
- Richard Wattis as Seton

== Production ==
Oscar Wilde's play was due to enter the public domain on 1 December 1950. Actor Michael Denison was under contract to Associated British and he had been lobbying for them to film some classic stage plays. Robert Clark, head of Associated, decided to register the title of The Importance of Being Earnest for production, which meant no other studio could use it. Clark was willing to make a movie of the play featuring Denison and his wife Dulcie Gray (who would play Gwendolyn) if John Gielgud - who had appeared as John in a famous 1939 stage production of Earnest - agreed to direct it as well as play the male lead. Denison approached Gielgud who turned it down, unsure the play would make a movie, and not wanting to act in it again.

Faced with this, Clark relinquished Associated British's rights to the title to the Rank Organisaiton, under the condition that Denison was cast in the film. (Gray was not part of this arrangement as she was not under contract to Associated British.) Earl St John of Rank allocated the film to the team of star Michael Redgrave, director Anthony Asquith and producer Teddy Baird, who had just made The Browning Version for Rank.

The film was financed through the British Film-Makers scheme where 70% of the budget was provided by Rank and the balance from the NFFC.

The script was written by Asquith. It is largely faithful to Wilde's text, although it divides some of the acts into shorter scenes in different locations.

The movie marked the film debut of Dorothy Tutin, who was recommended to Anthony Asquith by Michael Redgrave, who saw her on stage in Henry V.

Filming started at Pinewood Studios on 29 October 1951. The film is noted for its acting, although the parts played by Redgrave and Denison called for actors ten years younger. Margaret Rutherford, who plays Miss Prism in this adaptation, played Lady Bracknell in the 1946 BBC production.

Michael Denison recalled:

I loved Asquith as a director... He obviously loved the play, loved the wit and the shape of it, and loved the characters. He was completely in tune with the subject and, indeed, with the players. He didn’t guide us much, in my recollection. I remember the first day’s shooting — that long bit with the cigarette case — and we filmed it in quite large chunks, which was different from the normal method of filming. There are lots of quite long takes in it, not a lot of elaborate cutting.

Denison recalled it as a "very happy" shoot. "I think one of the important tasks of a director is a public relations exercise, and Puffin was admirable at that. I don’t think any of that company was awkward. Darling old Margaret Rutherford was an eccentric, but she was a most lovable person. The cameraman was an absolute ace." Rutherford said the film "was a joy to be in. "

== Reception ==
Variety wrote "all the charm and glossy humor of Oscar Wilde’s classic comedy emerges faithfully... As a drawingroom comedy, given a somewhat broader canvas, by its transference to the screen, it should prove to be a big winner here and most major cities, but some of its humor may be lost on audiences in rural areas."

A. H. Weiler called the casting of Dame Edith Evans in the role of Lady Bracknell "true genius".

Pauline Kael wrote, "The film is stagey, but highly enjoyable; Wilde’s multiple-entendres about love and money are delivered in the required high, dry style by an extraordinary cast." Filmink wrote "although stagey, it holds up well."

Michael Redgrave wrote in his memoirs that when he first saw the movie in a private screening "I was very disappointed. The tempo, which it is true must not be hurried, was ponderous, and sometimes the players... were too much in awe of Wilde to give their lines the air of conversation. I missed the response of an audience terribly... without it, both the actors and the story seemed very vulnerable." However every time Regrave subsequently saw the film he found he liked it more, adding "I find, in general, with a few obstinate exceptions, that I like my films more the further in time it is from the making of them. But with The Importance of Being Earnest time has restored a truer and certainly a more generous consideration of its qualities."

Edith Evans's outraged delivery of the line "A handbag?" has become legendary. As actor Ian McKellen wrote, it is a performance "so acclaimed and strongly remembered that it inhibits audiences and actors years later,"providing a challenge for anyone else taking on the role of Lady Bracknell.

== Awards and nominations ==
The film received a BAFTA nomination for Dorothy Tutin as Most Promising Newcomer and a Golden Lion nomination for Anthony Asquith at the Venice Film Festival.

== See also ==
- The Importance of Being Earnest (original play by Oscar Wilde)
- The Importance of Being Earnest (2002 film version)
