= It Started in Paradise =

1952 British film by Compton Bennett

- Theatrical release poster
- Directed by: Compton Bennett
- Written by: Marghanita Laski; Hugh Hastings
- Produced by: Sergei Nolbandov; Leslie Parkyn; Earl St. John
- Starring: Jane Hylton; Martita Hunt; Muriel Pavlow
- Cinematography: Jack Cardiff
- Edited by: Alan Osbiston
- Music by: Malcolm Arnold
- Production company: British Film-Makers
- Distributed by: General Film Distributors
- Release date: 28 October 1952
- Running time: 94 minutes
- Country: United Kingdom
- Language: English
- Box office: £72,000

It Started in Paradise is a 1952 British drama film directed by Compton Bennett and starring Jane Hylton, Martita Hunt and Muriel Pavlow.

Set in the world of haute couture, the storyline concerns an established master of her craft being usurped by a younger, ruthlessly ambitious underling, who then years later finds the same thing happening to her.

== Plot ==
In 1938, Mme. Alice, chief designer of a famous London fashion house, has lost her touch. Where once she was the most sought after designer in the city, now her creations seem locked in the past and clients are looking elsewhere for modern fashions. She is persuaded by her senior assistant Martha that she needs a long holiday to recapture her creative inspiration. Once Mme. Alice has departed the fiercely ambitious Martha, who has been biding her time for several years, launches a coup, designing and presenting a range of up-to-the-minute garments which are a huge success with the fashion media and bring clients flocking back to the salon. The financial backer of the business is delighted with the upturn in profits; Martha is promoted to chief designer. Although Mme. Alice upon her return retains her composure, she refuses to countenance the Salon's "Vulgar" new look; she prophesies Martha's doom, and walks out, parting forever from the fashion world.

Over the course of the next decade Martha, with the help of Alison, a talented girl she took on straight out of school, restores the house to its pre-eminent position in the London fashion world. She becomes so driven that she starts not to care whom she treads on in her quest to be the best in the business. Over the years while her professional career goes from strength to strength, she neglects friends, treats associates badly and makes business enemies.

By the start of the 1950s Martha too seems to have had her day; appreciation for her designs tapers off, after a failed love affair with a deceiving lothario, and her reputation falls. Those she has alienated on the way up are only too happy to watch her on her way down. Meanwhile, Alison, having initially declined to return after finding great success in America, eventually decides to return after all, prompted more by loyalty to one whom she loves at the company more than for any sentimentality for Martha. Her own designs are acclaimed innovative and contemporary by all. Now, it's Alison who's 'in', and Martha who's 'out': the cycle may begin again.

== Cast ==
- Jane Hylton as Martha Watkins
- Ian Hunter as Arthur Turner
- Terence Morgan as Edouard
- Muriel Pavlow as Alison
- Martita Hunt as Mme. Alice
- Brian Worth as Michael
- Kay Kendall as Lady Caroline Frencham
- Ronald Squire as Mary Jane
- Dana Wynter as Barbara
- Joyce Barbour as Lady Burridge
- Harold Lang as Mr. Louis
- Margaret Withers as Miss Madge
- Lucienne Hill as Mme. Lucienne
- Diana Decker as Crystal Leroy
- Arthur Lane as Sydney Bruce
- Audrey White as Gwen, the model
- Naomi Chance as Primrose, the model
- Barbara Allen as Anne, the model
- Dorinda Stevens as Flo the barmaid
- Anna Turner as Lil the barmaid
- Frank Tickle as Mr. Paul
- Helen Forrest as Maureen
- Mara Lane as 'Little Dark Popsie'
- Avis Scott as journalist
- Conrad Phillips as 1st photographer
- Bill Travers as 2nd photographer
- Alan Gifford as American captain
- Bruce Seton as club manager
- Valerie Mewes as model (uncredited)

== Production ==
The movie was known as Fanfare for Fig Leaves. In February 1952 Earl St John, head of production at Rank, announced British Film-Makers would make a slate of 12 movies at a cost of £1,500,000, including Fanfare for Fig Leaves with Kay Kendall and Ian Hunter. British Film-Makers was a short lived production scheme that operated in Britain in the early 1950s as a co operative venture between the Rank Organisation and the National Film Finance Corporation (NFFC), whereby Rank would provide 70% of finance and the rest came from the NFFC. The Rank Organisation itself was making 20 films that year. The lead role actually went to Jane Hylton.

Filming started 17 March 1952. The film was made at Pinewood Studios with sets designed by the art director Edward Carrick. It was shot in Technicolor and is described by Hal Erickson of Allmovie as: "an unusually plush, Lana Turner-esque production to come from a British studio in the early 1950s".

Muriel Pavlow recalls there "were a lot of ‘backstage’ problems on" the film:

They engaged a nice young woman who had produced some fine designs, but she had no experience of dressing films. About a third of the way through it became apparent that what she was doing was a disaster; so another designer was brought in to finish off the film, and, from then on, we all began to look rather smarter. The story was fairly ‘Peg’s Paper’; still, it was a very lucky film for me. Compton Bennett had considerable success directing in Hollywood, but he didn’t whip us along as he should have done in this one.

== Reception ==
=== Critical ===
Variety wrote "Film’s strongest asset is its high-grade Technicolor. Jack Cardiff has done a standout lensing job, aided by spacious settings and ex- pansive fashions. Appeal of the film is entirely visual... the plot is unadulterated hokum and the dialog rarely rises above the commonplace. Situations are obvious, with little imagination used in the treatment. Yarn unspools leisurely with the minimum action and barely an exterior setting."

The Monthly Film Bulletin wrote: "The idea seems to have been to make a sort of British All About Eve, set in the fashion world. Unfortunately, the writing, the playing and the direction painfully lack style, wit and penetration. Two small performances by Martita Hunt and Harold Lang suggest what might have been done. The colour photography is mainly unattractive, and the fashions implausible."

The Times wrote: "The boldest pen may be excused from shying away like a nervous horse at a high fence from this truly deplorable film. Its world is the world of Haute Couture. It has probably got most of the details right and very admirable are some of the Technicolor backgrounds, but that is the most that can be said in its favour".

The New York Times wrote: "have a tendency to run somewhat to froth". It concluded: "Well, let's be gentlemanly about it. Maybe there are those who can find some sort of excitement in the kind of lather worked up in this film". It did, however, comment that Ronald Squire had a few good lines and the visual portrayal of the dress salon was well defined.

Guide to British Cinema described it as starting strongly, but with a disappointing climax.

Filmink argued "the movie is sunk by incompetence at all levels except photography and costumes; Compton Bennett, who’d leapt to fame as director of The Seventh Veil, spent the rest of his career being found out, of which It Started in Paradise is a key example."

=== Box office ===
The film performed poorly at the box office.
