= Naomi Chance =

English actress (1927–2003)

- Born: December 1927; Bath, Somerset, England
- Died: 18 March 2003 (aged 75); France
- Occupation: Actress
- Spouse: Guy Hamilton (1953 – before 1964)

Naomi Chance (born Naomi Freeman, December 1927 – 18 March 2003) was an English film and television actress. She appeared in many television shows from the 1950s onwards, including The Plane Makers (as Joyce Pender); five times in Compact (Harriet Stone); The Newcomers (Amelia Huntley); once in each of the following 1970s television shows: The Sweeney (Fay Mayhew); Within These Walls (Jean Betts); The Hanged Man (Jane Cowley); and many others.

== Filmography ==
Year	Title	Role	Notes
1950	Night and the City	Nightclub Hostess	Uncredited
1952	Wings of Danger	Avril Talbot	
1952	It Started in Paradise	Primrose, the model	Uncredited
1952	The Gambler and the Lady	Lady Susan Willens	
1953	Top of the Form	Northern Woman On Station	Uncredited
1953	Blood Orange	Gina, a model	
1953	The Saint's Girl Friday	Carol Denby	
1953	Strange Stories	Young woman	
1954	Dangerous Voyage	Joan Drew	
1954	The End of the Road	Molly	
1956	A Touch of the Sun	Miss Caroline Lovejoy	
1957	Suspended Alibi	Diana	
1957	Confess, Killer	Edna Farson	with Leo McKern
1958	The Man Inside	Jane Leighton	
1959	Operation Bullshine	Subaltern Godfrey A.T.S.	
1960	The Trials of Oscar Wilde	Lillie Langtry	
1964	The Comedy Man	Minor Role	
1965	He Who Rides a Tiger	Lady Cleveland	

== Personal life ==
Chance married director Guy Hamilton in 1953, but they later divorced (Hamilton remarried in 1964).

Her second husband was a retired naval surgeon, with whom she lived in Devon.
