= Trouble in Store =

1953 British film by John Paddy Carstairs

- Original British Quad poster
- Directed by: John Paddy Carstairs
- Written by: John Paddy Carstairs; Maurice Cowan; Ted Willis; Jill Craigie
- Produced by: Maurice Cowan; Earl St. John
- Starring: Norman Wisdom; Moira Lister; Margaret Rutherford; Jerry Desmonde
- Cinematography: Ernest Steward
- Edited by: Geoffrey Foot; Peter Seabourne
- Music by: Mischa Spoliansky
- Production company: Two Cities Films
- Distributed by: General Film Distributors; Republic Pictures (US)
- Release date: 14 December 1953
- Running time: 85 minutes
- Country: United Kingdom
- Language: English
- Budget: £125,000

Trouble in Store is a 1953 British comedy film directed by John Paddy Carstairs and starring Norman Wisdom in his cinema debut. The film also featured Moira Lister, Margaret Rutherford, Jerry Desmonde and Lana Morris. For his performance, Wisdom won a BAFTA Award for Most Promising Newcomer. Although it was shown at a West End venue, the film broke box office records at 51 out of the 67 London cinemas in which it played.

The film was shot at Pinewood Studios with sets designed by the art director Alex Vetchinsky. It was released by Rank's General Film Distributors and was later released in America by Republic Pictures. The film's success led to Wisdom appearing in a string of films for Rank beginning with One Good Turn.

== Plot ==
Norman, a lowly stock clerk at Burridge's department store, is in love with fellow employee Sally Wilson, though he has been unable to muster the courage to let her know how he feels. After he antagonizes Augustus Freeman, the new head of the store, he is promptly fired. On his way out, Norman helps Miss Bacon carry her bulging suitcases, unaware that she is an audacious shoplifter. Freeman sees Norman assisting a "customer" and rehires him.

Meanwhile, Peggy Drew, the store's personnel manager, flirts with Mr. Freeman, while plotting with her boyfriend Gerald to rob the place. Norman is fired and rehired again and again, as his escapades somehow manage to benefit the store. He also finally becomes acquainted with Sally, chasing her down through the city streets to return her handbag. His antics make her laugh.

After his latest firing, Norman is alarmed to find the handsome, suave Gerald trying to get to know Sally better. When he goes to the man's apartment to warn him to stay away from her, Norman inadvertently uncovers the robbery plot, scheduled to coincide with a big sale the next day, but he is unable to get Sally or anyone else to take him seriously.

Sally eventually decides to bring Norman's story to the attention of the management, but tells the wrong person, Miss Drew, and is tied up for her efforts. Norman finds her and together, they foil the thieves. Freeman takes Norman back into his employ and prepares to discuss a promotion - only to fire him yet again moments later.

== Cast ==
- Norman Wisdom as Norman
- Lana Morris as Sally Wilson
- Moira Lister as Peggy Drew
- Jerry Desmonde as Augustus Freeman
- Derek Bond as Gerald
- Margaret Rutherford as Miss Bacon the shoplifter
- Megs Jenkins as Miss Gibson, Norman's loyal friend in the stockroom
- Michael Brennan as Davis
- Michael Ward as Wilbur
- Joan Sims as Edna
- Eddie Leslie as Bill
- Joan Ingram as Miss Denby
- Cyril Chamberlain as Alf
- Ronan O'Casey as Eddie
- Roddy Hughes as Taffy
- Graham Tonbridge as Mr. Graham, Department Head
- Esma Cannon as woman at cafe

== Production ==
Earl St John saw Norman Wisdom on television and signed him to Rank on a seven-year contract. However an initial screen test between Wisdom and Petula Clark under the direction of Ronald Neame went poorly. Rank tried to get out of the contract, but Wisdom and his agent insisted it be honoured. Wisdom says St John then arranged for Jill Craigie to write a vehicle specifically for him, which she did over six weeks. John Paddy Carstairs became attached as director and worked on the script with Wisdom, who says Ted Willis and producer Maurice Cowan also worked on the script. Another account says Craigie reportedly asked that her name be removed from the credits after learning of Wisdom's participation.

== Reception ==
The Daily Mirror reviewer wrote of the film: "If you don't laugh at Norman's antics as the downtrodden worker in a big store, trying to get promotion as a window dresser, there is something wrong with your sense of fun".

The film was the second most popular at the British box office in 1954.
