= Jill Craigie =

British documentary filmmaker (1911–1999)

- Born: Noreen Jean Craigie; 7 March 1911; London, England
- Died: 13 December 1999 (aged 88); London, England
- Occupations: Documentary film director, screenwriter and feminist
- Spouses: Claude Begbie-Clench (m. 1933; div. 1933) Jeffrey Dell (m. 1938; div. 1948) Michael Foot (m. 1949)
- Children: 1

Noreen Jean "Jill" Craigie (7 March 1911 – 13 December 1999) was a British documentary film director, producer, screenwriter and feminist. She was one of Britain's earliest female documentary makers. Her early films demonstrate Craigie's interest in socialist and feminist politics, but her career as a film-maker has been "somewhat eclipsed" by her marriage to the Labour Party leader Michael Foot (1913–2010), whom she met during the making of her film The Way We Live (1946).

== Early life ==
Born Noreen Jean Craigie to a Russian mother and a Scottish father in Fulham, London, England, Craigie began her career in film as an actress.

== Career ==
Craigie's engagement in feminist issues came from reading Sylvia Pankhurst's The Suffragette Movement in the early 1940s. After this she attended a gathering of former suffragettes to lay flowers on the statue of Emmeline Pankhurst. She was struck by the suffragettes' story and began interviewing them and starting to lay the groundwork for a documentary of the movement. This never materialized due to the complicated internal politics of the suffrage movement post-campaign. Much of this correspondence can be found in her archives. In latter years, Craigie became an authority on the suffragette movement, holding a large collection of feminist literature in Britain, with pamphlets dating back to John Stuart Mill. In 1979, she wrote an introduction to a reprint of Emmeline Pankhurst's My Own Story, first published 1914.

Her subsequent films depicted her socialist and feminist leanings and dealt with left-wing topics such as child refugees, working conditions for miners, and gender equality. The British Federation of Business & Professional Women paid Caigie for an Equal Pay Campaign Committee film and her film, To Be A Woman was first screened in 1951. After directing five films and writing two others, Craigie retired from the film business for almost forty years, returning to make a single film for BBC television.

Craigie was one of the scriptwriters of Trouble in Store, Norman Wisdom's film debut, which screened in December 1953. The film broke box-office records at 51 out of the 67 London cinemas in which it played. After writing the first draft of the script, Craigie reportedly asked that her name be removed from the credits after learning of Wisdom's participation.

Craigie served on the Board of Governors of the British Film Institute, having been appointed to the role by the Harold Wilson government.

== Personal life ==
Craigie had a daughter, Julie, from her first marriage. Julie was in a relationship with Sean Connery in 1956. She and Michael Foot had no children together, but enjoyed family life with Julie and, later, her four children. They lived in a flat in Hampstead, north London, and in a cottage in Ebbw Vale, Wales. While living in Hampstead, Craigie worked as an Air Raid Precaution Warden during World War II.

In 1998, a biography of the late Hungarian-born writer Arthur Koestler by David Cesarani alleged that Koestler had been a serial rapist and that Craigie had been one of his victims in 1951. Craigie confirmed the allegations. In a 2009 biography, Koestler: The Indispensable Intellectual, Michael Scammell countered that Craigie was the only woman to go on record that she had been raped by Koestler, and had done so at a dinner party many years after the event. Claims that Koestler had been violent were added by Craigie later, although Scammell concedes that Koestler could be rough and sexually aggressive.

Craigie died aged 88 in 1999 of heart failure at the Royal Free Hospital in Hampstead, London.

== Critical reception and legacy ==
Craigie's films were recognised for their "ability to bring out the best in 'ordinary people'" and the "political commitment". Philip Kemp commented more directly on the political content of Craigie's films, noting that her films were an "example of filmmaking as activism, the creative and political processes intertwining and advancing each other that even the Soviet filmmakers of the 1920s had only rarely achieved".

In 2022, a documentary about her life was released. Independent Miss Craigie was directed by Lizzie Thynne, and is available on BFI player. It is one element in a larger research project designed to bring Craigie to wider scholarly and public attention. "Jill Craigie: Film Pioneer" is based at the University of Sussex and funded by the Arts and Humanities Research Council.

In 2026, English Heritage unveiled a blue plaque in Craigie's honour at 66 Pilgrim's Lane, Hampstead in London where she lived between 1965 and 1999.

== Archives ==
The archives of Jill Craigie are held at The Women's Library at the Library of the London School of Economics, ref 7JCC.

== Filmography ==
- Make-Up (1937), actress
- Looking Through Glass (1943), script
- The Flemish Farm (1943), screenwriter (credited as "Jill Dell")
- Out of Chaos (1944), writer and director
- London Terminus (1944), script
- The Way We Live (1946), writer and director
- "Children of the Ruins (1948)". BFI Screenonline. Archived from the original on 7 September 2009.
- Blue Scar (1949), writer and director
- To Be a Woman (1951), writer, director and producer
- The Million Pound Note (1953), screenwriter
- Trouble in Store (1953), uncredited screenwriter
- Windom's Way (1957), screenwriter
- Who Are the Vandals? (1967), director
- Two Hours from London (1995)

== Publications ==
- Craigie, Jill (28 October 1955). "I Call This a National Calamity". Tribune.
- Craigie, Jill (6 July 1962). "Pilkington: A Second Chance for Television". Tribune.
- Craigie, Jill (1997). "Political Blood Sport". In Goodman, Geoffrey (ed.). The State of the Nation: The Political Legacy of Aneurin Bevan. London: Gollancz. pp. 88–105. ISBN 0-575-06308-4.

== See also ==
- Feminist film theory
- Socialist realism
