= Top of the Form (film) =

1953 British film by John Paddy Carstairs

- Original British quad poster
- Directed by: John Paddy Carstairs
- Written by: John Paddy Carstairs; Patrick Kirwan; Ted Willis; Sid Colin
- Story by: Anthony Kimmins; Val Guest; Leslie Arliss; Marriott Edgar
- Produced by: Paul Soskin
- Starring: Ronald Shiner
- Cinematography: Ernest Steward
- Edited by: Alfred Roome
- Music by: Ronald Hanmer
- Production companies: Paul Soskin Productions; British Film-Makers
- Distributed by: General Film Distributors
- Release date: 9 March 1953
- Running time: 72 minutes
- Country: United Kingdom
- Language: English
- Box office: £143,000 (UK)

Top of the Form (also known as Fair's Fair) is a 1953 British black-and-white comedy film directed by John Paddy Carstairs and starring Ronald Shiner, Anthony Newley and Harry Fowler. The film draws inspiration from Will Hay's 1937 classic Good Morning, Boys.

== Plot summary ==
This story explores a bookmaker Ronnie Fortescue, who becomes headmaster of a boys' school, and of his and his pupil's adventures in passing examinations and on a subsequent free trip to Paris. Once in Paris, headmaster and pupils become embroiled in gambling casinos, and in a plot to steal the French Crown Jewels.

== Cast ==
- Ronald Shiner as Professor Ronnie Fortescue
- Anthony Newley as Percy
- Harry Fowler as Albert
- Jacqueline Pierreux as Yvette
- Alfie Bass as Arty Jones
- Mary Jerrold as Mrs. Bagshot
- Richard Wattis as Willoughby Gore
- Howard Marion-Crawford as Dickson
- Roland Curram as Terence
- Terence Mitchell as Clarence
- Gerald Campion as Pugley
- Oscar Quitak as Septimus
- Kynaston Reeves as the Dean
- Martin Benson as Cliquet
- Graham Stark as Wilson
- Hal Osmond as Barber
- Danny Green as bookies' thug
- Melvyn Hayes as schoolboy with glasses
- Ronnie Corbett as student (uncredited)
- Ronan O'Casey as brother
- Naomi Chance as Northern woman on station
- Andreas Malandrinos as museum concierge

== Production ==
The film was made through British Film-Makers, a short lived production scheme that operated in Britain in the early 1950s as a co operative venture between the Rank Organisation and the National Film Finance Corporation (NFFC), whereby Rank would provide 70% of finance and the rest came from the NFFC.

Star Ronald Shiner had been voted the most popular British box office star of 1952 on the basis of Worm's Eye View and Reluctant Heroes. He had just made Little Big Shot from a script by John Paddy Carstairs.

The movie was originally known as Fair's Fair.

Filming took place in September 1952. It was made at Pinewood Studios near London with sets designed by the art director Maurice Carter. Actors who played schoolboys include Anthony Newley and Ronnie Corbett.

== Reception ==
=== Box office ===
The film earned billings of £143,000 which Rank's internal records described as "good". The Motion Picture Herald confirms the film was a success at the box office and helped Shiner be voted the third most popular British star of 1953.

The success of the film led to Carstairs being reunited with Shiner in Up to His Neck although Paul Soskin was replaced as producer by Hugh Stewart since Carstairs no longer wanted to work with Soskin.

=== Critical ===
The Monthly Film Bulletin wrote: "Good Morning, Boys was possibly crude and to some distasteful, and its success depended on Will Hay. Ronald Shiner, though a popular comedian whose presence will no doubt ensure the film's box-office success, is far from being another Will Hay, and the film consequently remains crude and distasteful. The comedy, poorly scripted, is slow and unfunny, and depends mainly on slapstick and slap and tickle."

The Radio Times called it a "misfiring Ronald Shiner vehicle... Less amusing than [Will] Hay's St Michael's outings and less anarchic than the St Trinian's romps, this efficient but underwhelming caper is all too typical of its director, John Paddy Carstairs".

TV Guide hailed "An entertaining comedy."
