= Captain Carey, U.S.A. =

1950 film by Mitchell Leisen

- Theatrical release poster
- Directed by: Mitchell Leisen
- Screenplay by: Robert Thoeren
- Based on: After Midnight by Martha Albrand
- Produced by: Richard Maibaum
- Starring: Alan Ladd; Wanda Hendrix; Francis Lederer
- Cinematography: John F. Seitz
- Edited by: Alma Macrorie
- Music by: Hugo Friedhofer
- Color process: Black and white
- Production company: Paramount Pictures
- Distributed by: Paramount Pictures
- Release dates: February 21, 1950; March 29, 1950 (New York)
- Running time: 83 minutes
- Country: United States
- Language: English
- Box office: $1,625,000

Captain Carey, U.S.A. (released as After Midnight in the United Kingdom) is a 1950 American Paramount Pictures crime thriller directed by Mitchell Leisen and starring Alan Ladd and Wanda Hendrix. The film is based on the 1948 novel After Midnight by Martha Albrand.

The theme song, "Mona Lisa", is first performed in the film by Sergio de Karlo and is a recurrent motif throughout. Jay Livingston and Ray Evans won the Academy Award for Best Original Song, and the song became a #1 hit for Nat King Cole.

Although Ladd plays an O.S.S. officer in Captain Carey, U.S.A. and had starred in O.S.S. (1946), the two films are not otherwise related.

== Plot ==
A group of agents of the U.S. Office of Strategic Services (a forerunner of the Central Intelligence Agency) is sent to German-occupied Italy during World War II to neutralize the German-held Italian railroad system. In accomplishing the mission, most of them are killed because of an inside betrayal.

After the war, one of the survivors, Captain Webster Carey, resolves to find the traitor. Carey returns to Orta, near Milan, to determine who betrayed his team and caused the deaths of several villagers. He is surprised to learn that his former love Giulia, whom he thought dead at the hands of the Nazis, is alive and married to powerful Italian nobleman Barone Rocco de Greffi. The villagers are unfriendly, but Carey persists in his clandestine efforts to find the traitor, whom he discovers is de Greffi.

== Cast ==
- Alan Ladd as Captain Webster Carey
- Wanda Hendrix as Baronessa Giulia de Greffi
- Francis Lederer as Barone Rocco de Greffi
- Joseph Calleia as Dr. Lunati
- Celia Lovsky as Countess Francesca de Cresci
- Richard Avonde as Count Carlo de Cresci
- Frank Puglia as Luigi
- Luis Alberni as Sandro
- Angela Clarke as Serafina
- Roland Winters as Manfredo Acuto
- Paul Lees as Frank
- Jane Nigh as Nancy
- Russ Tamblyn as Pietro (billed as Rusty Tamblyn)
- Virginia Farmer as Angelina
- David Leonard as Blind Musician
- Ernő Verebes as Detective
- Ray Walker as Mr. Simmons
- Argentina Brunetti as Villager (uncredited)
- Gino Corrado as Villager (uncredited)

== Production ==
The film was based on the serial Dishonored. Jonathan Latimer was originally announced as screenwriter and the stars were to be Ray Milland and Alida Valli, with the title to be After Midnight. Then Alan Ladd was given the lead role and Lewis Allen was named as director. Eventually Mitchell Leisen assumed the director's role.

Filming started on January 3, 1949.

== Reception ==
The film was released in England in late 1949 as After Midnight but not shown in the U.S. until 1950, thus making it eligible for the 1950 Academy Awards. The film was first released to public audiences in a midnight showing on March 25, 1950, in Miami, Florida, where advertisements stating only "Captain Carey Is Coming! Watch for Him!" ran in local papers each day of the preceding week.

In a contemporary review for The New York Times, critic Bosley Crowther called the film "a disappointing dud" and wrote: "The fault is that the activities of Captain Carey and the others in the piece are much too lethargic and discursive for any interest to accumulate. In the first place, the plot is thickened to the density of a bucket of tar and, in the second place, the solving of the mystery is about as compelling as a slap on the wrist. Only in the final sequence, when Captain Carey gets his man in a basement room, do the fists really fly, the daggers whistle and the furniture dissolves into kindling wood."

Chicago Tribune critic Mae Tinée wrote: "Mr. Ladd ls agile and adventurous, if somewhat expressionless, hero, but the story meanders pointlessly, and the supporting cast is adequate, but unremarkable. Little Wanda Hendrix is fragile and babyish, and has quite a time handling an Italian accent. In spite of flying knives and flailing fists, this movie offers little genuine excitement."

== Awards ==
The film is recognized by American Film Institute in these lists:

- 2004: AFI's 100 Years...100 Songs:
  - "Mona Lisa" – Nominated
