= Mary Ure =

British actress (1933–1975)

- Ure in Where Eagles Dare (1968)
- Born: Eileen Mary Ure; 18 February 1933; Glasgow, Lanarkshire, Scotland
- Died: 3 April 1975 (aged 42); London, England
- Resting place: London Road Cemetery
- Education: Royal Central School of Speech and Drama
- Occupation: Actress
- Years active: 1955–1975
- Spouses: John Osborne (m. 1957; div. 1963) Robert Shaw (m. 1963)
- Children: 4, including Ian Shaw

Mary Eileen Ure (18 February 1933 – 3 April 1975) was a British actress. She was the second Scottish-born actress (after Deborah Kerr) to be nominated for an Academy Award, for her role in the 1960 film Sons and Lovers.

== Early life ==
Born in Glasgow, Ure was the daughter of civil engineer Colin McGregor Ure and Edith Swinburne. She went to the independent Mount School in York, where in 1951 she played the role of the Virgin Mary in the York Cycle of Mystery Plays, revived for the Festival of Britain. She trained for the stage at the Royal Central School of Speech and Drama, then based at the Royal Albert Hall, London, where her classmates included the actress Wendy Craig. In her final year, 1954, she won the Carleton Hobbs Bursary to join the Radio Drama Company, but declined it. Known for her beauty, Ure began performing on the London stage and quickly developed a reputation for her abilities as a dramatic actress.

== Career ==
Ure made her London debut as Amanda in Time Remembered (1954). Ure first appeared on screen in Storm Over The Nile (1955) playing the love interest of hero Anthony Steel. It was made by Alexander Korda who put Ure under contract; when he died the contract was taken over by Rank.

She was Ophelia in a 1955 stage production of Hamlet starring Paul Scofield that was filmed the following year for television. She appeared in a London stage production of A View from the Bridge (1956).

Ure played a leading role as Alison Porter in John Osborne's new play Look Back in Anger (1956). She and Osborne married and in 1958, she was in the Broadway production of Look Back in Anger and earned a Tony Award nomination for Best Dramatic Actress.

Her second film was Windom's Way (1957), made for Rank, where she played the wife of Peter Finch. After doing The Lady's Not for Burning (1958) on British TV she transferred her fragile, captivating portrayal of "Alison Porter" from stage to screen in the 1959 film adaptation of Look Back in Anger.

Ure did a season at Stratford, appearing in A Midsummer Night's Dream (1959) and Othello (1959). She appeared in the film Sons and Lovers (1960) as Clara Dawes, earning nominations for both the Golden Globe Award and the Academy Award for Best Supporting Actress.

After making the movie Ure performed in Duel of Angels in London and Broadway. While pregnant she performed in the 1960 London production of The Changeling at the Royal Court. The success of Sons and Lovers meant for a time Ure was seen as a possible major movie star in America.

In 1963, after an absence of three years, she returned to film with a performance in the sci-fi drama The Mind Benders, playing the wife of Dirk Bogarde.

She appeared several times on screen with then-husband Robert Shaw: A Florentine Tragedy (1964) for television, based on a script by Shaw; The Luck of Ginger Coffey (1964); and Custer of the West (1967), playing Custer's wife.

After 1968's Where Eagles Dare it would be three years before Ure's next and last film appearance, in 1971's A Reflection of Fear, co-starring her husband. However, she did appear in A Bit of Family Feeling (1971) for television.

She returned to Broadway in Old Times (1971). Her growing alcoholism affected her stage career to the point that she was fired from the 1974 pre-Broadway production of Love for Love and was replaced by her understudy, Glenn Close. Her last screen appearance was on TV in The Break (1974).

She returned to the London stage after a 12-year break to appear in The Exorcism.

== Personal life ==
In 1956, Ure began an affair with married playwright John Osborne while working on the initial production of his play Look Back in Anger. The couple married in 1957, had a son in 1961, but divorced in 1963. Osborne had continued having affairs during the marriage, and Ure started an affair with her co-star Robert Shaw in 1959, while the two were performing in the London stage production of The Changeling. It is believed that Shaw was her son's biological father.

Ure and Shaw married in 1963, with Shaw adopting Ure's son. Ure and Shaw had three more children together, including the actor Ian Shaw (born 1969). Ure and Shaw were still married at the time of her death.

== Decline and death ==
Ure experienced alcohol dependence and other mental health challenges throughout the early 1970s. On Wednesday 2 April 1975, she appeared on the London stage with Honor Blackman, Ronald Hines and Brian Blessed in an adaptation of the teleplay The Exorcism by Don Taylor and "within hours of a triumphant opening [night]" was found dead, aged 42, from an overdose of alcohol and barbiturates. Her body was discovered by her husband, Robert Shaw, in their London home.

== Performances ==
=== Plays (partial list) ===
- Time Remembered (1954) (London)
- Hamlet (1955) (Stratford)
- A View from the Bridge (1956) (London)
- Look Back in Anger (1957) (London & Broadway)
- A Midsummer Night's Dream (1959) (Stratford)
- Othello (1959) (Stratford)
- Duel of Angels (1960) (London & Broadway)
- The Changeling (1961) (London)
- Old Times (1971) (Broadway)
- Love for Love (1974) (Broadway)
- The Exorcism (1975) (London)

=== Films ===
- Storm Over the Nile (1955) - Mary Burroughs
- Windom's Way (1957) - Lee Windom
- Look Back in Anger (1958) - Alison Porter
- Sons and Lovers (1960) (Nominee Best Supporting Actress Academy Award and Golden Globe) - Clara Dawes
- The Mind Benders (1963) - Oonagh Longman
- The Luck of Ginger Coffey (1964) - Vera Coffey
- Custer of the West (1967) - Elizabeth Custer
- Where Eagles Dare (1968) - Mary Ellison
- A Reflection of Fear (1971) - Katherine

== In popular culture ==
The Irish poet Richard Murphy includes a poem about Mary Ure in his Collected Poems, wherein she is depicted as a nymph-like figure on the shores of Lough Mask on a summer afternoon.

== See also ==
- Scottish actresses

== Major sources ==
- Heilpern, John (2006). John Osborne: A Patriot for Us. Chatto & Windus. ISBN 0099275864.
- Upton, Julian (2004). Fallen Stars: Tragic Lives and Lost Careers. Critical Vision.
