= Edward Malin =

British actor (1894–1977)

- Malin on Hylda Baker's edition of This Is Your Life in 1972
- Born: Edward Ernest Malin; 23 October 1894; Stoke Newington, London, England
- Died: 1 March 1977 (aged 82); Ealing, London, England
- Other name: Eddie Malin
- Occupation: Actor
- Years active: 1948–1973

Edward Ernest Malin (23 October 1894 in Stoke Newington, London – 1 March 1977 in Ealing, London) was an English actor.

He was the youngest of seven children of John Malin (1850–1921), a purse maker in a fancy leather works, and Martha née Hackworthy (1855–1905). In 1911 at age 16, he was working as a tracer in a boiler works. During World War I, he served in the Royal Navy and became a Freemason in the Antioch Lodge No. 3271 in February 1918.

Malin mostly played in small, often uncredited roles in both film and TV, including as a dining saloon steward in the 1958 film A Night to Remember, as well as a waiter in the seminal 1964 film A Hard Day's Night, starring The Beatles. He achieved most of his fame as the mute and geriatric character of Walter Tattersall in the sitcom Nearest and Dearest from 1969 to 1973.

Malin died on 1 March 1977, aged 82 at the King Edward Memorial hospital in Ealing, London. He had been resident at the actors' retirement home of Denville Hall, Northwood, Middlesex, for several years.

== Selected filmography ==
- William Comes to Town (1948) - Toy Shop Man (uncredited)
- The Greed of William Hart (1948) - David Paterson
- Genevieve (1953) - Spectator (uncredited)
- The End of the Road (1954) - Nightwatchman
- The Million Pound Note (1954) - Clergyman at Belgrave Square (uncredited)
- A Kid for Two Farthings (1955) - Dog Man (uncredited)
- The Story of Esther Costello (1957) - Man in Irish pub (uncredited)
- The Silent Enemy (1958) - High Ranking British Navy Officer at Conference (uncredited)
- A Night to Remember (1958) - Dining Saloon Steward
- The Two-Headed Spy (1958) - Orderly (uncredited)
- Inn for Trouble (1960) - Old Charlie
- Operation Cupid (1960) - Smelly
- The Millionairess (1960) - Kabir's Patient (uncredited)
- Hair of the Dog (1962) - Sidney
- A Hard Day's Night (1964) - Hotel Waiter
- How to Steal a Million (1966) - Insurance Clerk
- Crooks and Coronets (1969) - 2nd Old Man (uncredited)
- The Bed-Sitting Room (1969) - Club Waiter
- Percy (1971) - Elderly patient
- Nearest and Dearest (1972) - Walter Tattersall
