= No Surrender (novel) =

1942 novel

- First edition (US)
- Author: Martha Albrand
- Language: English
- Genre: Thriller
- Publisher: Little, Brown (Boston); Chatto and Windus (London)
- Publication date: 1942
- Publication place: United States
- Media type: Print

No Surrender is a 1942 war thriller novel by the German writer Martha Albrand, by then living in exile in the United States. It focuses on the activities of the Dutch Resistance during World War II and was favourably reviewed by critics. It was serialized in The Saturday Evening Post. Her first novel since emigrating in 1937, it launched her popular reputation in the English-speaking world.

== Synopsis ==
Ruis, a Dutch army officer is wounded and captured during the German invasion of the Netherlands. He is offered a choice to work and collaborate with the German occupiers or face execution. He agrees to work for the Germans as a mean for slipping secret information to the Dutch underground. Yet his secret patriotic activities are unknown by his American wife and Dutch friends who hate him for serving the Germans.

== Bibliography ==
- Reilly, John M. Twentieth Century Crime & Mystery Writers. Springer, 2015.
