= After Midnight (Albrand novel) =

1948 novel by Martha Albrand

- First edition (US)
- Author: Martha Albrand
- Language: English
- Genre: Thriller
- Publisher: Random House (New York); Chatto and Windus (London)
- Publication date: 1948
- Publication place: United States
- Media type: Print

After Midnight is a 1948 thriller novel by the German writer Martha Albrand, who had been living in the United States since 1937. It was initially serialized in a slightly different version under the title Dishonored in The Saturday Evening Post.

== Synopsis ==
During World War II American OSS operative Webster Carr was betrayed to the Germans on a small Italian island. After the war he returns again to uncover who it was who gave him away. Author, Martha Albrand; Edition, reprint; Publisher, Random House, 1948; Original from the University of Michigan; Digitized, May 18, 2007.

== Film adaptation ==
In 1950, it was adapted into the Hollywood film Captain Carey, U.S.A. directed by Mitchell Leisen and starring Alan Ladd, Wanda Hendrix and Francis Lederer.

== Bibliography ==
- Deutsch, James I. Coming Home from "The Good War": World War II Veterans as Depicted in American Film and Fiction. George Washington University, 1991.
- Reilly, John M. Twentieth Century Crime & Mystery Writers. Springer, 2015.
