= Desperate Moment (novel) =

1951 novel

- First edition (US)
- Author: Martha Albrand
- Language: English
- Genre: Thriller
- Publisher: Random House (New York); Chatto and Windus (London)
- Publication date: 1951
- Publication place: United States
- Media type: Print

Desperate Moment is a 1951 thriller novel by the German writer Martha Albrand, then living in the United States. It takes place in postwar Europe where a man breaks out of prison to try and find the men who set him up.

== Film adaptation ==
In 1953 it was made into a British film of the same title directed by Compton Bennett and starring Dirk Bogarde, Mai Zetterling and Albert Lieven.

== Bibliography ==
- Goble, Alan. The Complete Index to Literary Sources in Film. Walter de Gruyter, 1999.
- Reilly, John M. Twentieth Century Crime & Mystery Writers. Springer, 2015.
