= The Gambler and the Lady =

- Theatrical release poster
- Directed by: Sam Newfield (uncredited); Patrick Jenkins
- Written by: Sam Newfield
- Produced by: Anthony Hinds
- Starring: Dane Clark; Kathleen Byron; Naomi Chance; Anthony Forwood
- Cinematography: Walter J. Harvey; Moray Grant
- Edited by: Maurice Rootes
- Music by: Ivor Slaney
- Production company: Hammer Film Productions
- Distributed by: Lippert Pictures (US); Exclusive Films (UK)
- Release dates: December 1952 (U.S.); 26 January 1953 (UK)
- Running time: 74 minutes (UK); 71 minutes (US)
- Country: United Kingdom
- Language: English

The Gambler and the Lady is a 1952 British second feature ('B') crime film directed by Sam Newfield and starring Dane Clark, Kathleen Byron and Naomi Chance. It was written by Newfield and produced by Hammer Films, filmed at Bray Studios. Michael Carreras handled casting, Phil Leakey Makeup and J. Elder Wills was Art Director. The film was directed by American Sam Newfield, but for labor quota reasons, a British director (Patrick Jenkins) had to be credited instead on the British prints (both were co-credited on the US prints). Filming went from May 19, 1952, through June 16, 1952, and the film was trade shown in the UK on Jan. 6, 1953. The film was released first in the US in December 1952, and then later in the UK in January, 1953.

== Plot ==
Four years before, American gambler Jim Forster was broke. He borrowed £1 from Maxie, proprietor of Maxie's Barn, and had a very lucky gambling streak. He continued to rise and now owns posh illegal casinos, a nightclub and other enterprises in London. He aspires to find acceptance amongst the British upper class, taking daily lessons in correct behaviour from Miss Minter.

One night, casino employee Jacko Spina reluctantly accepts a cheque from Lord Peter Willens for gambling losses. The cheque bounces, but Jim orders Jacko not to do anything about it. Jacko roughs up Willens anyway to try to collect the money. Willens comes to see Jim and informs him he will be paid in a week; Jim tells him he had nothing to do with Willens' beating. Afterwards, Jim fires Jacko.

Dave Davies, Jim's longtime friend and bookkeeper, warns him the Colonnas are in town. They were big-time gangsters in the United States until they were deported. Now they run casinos in Rome and Paris. Arturo Colonna offers to buy Jim's operation and pay him 10% to run things. He turns them down.

Meanwhile, Jim breaks up with his girlfriend Pat, a professional dancer at his nightclub, whom he has tired of. Later, he spots Willens and his friends celebrating the 21st birthday of Lady Jane Greer at his nightclub. He comes over, but is openly mocked by Greer and most of the party. The sole exception is Lady Susan Willens, Lord Willens' sister. She dances with him, and he invites her to a boxing match. (This is witnessed by Pat. She later starts drinking heavily and saying nasty things about Jim.) Jim sees more of Susan. Susan initially consider Jim just a friend, until a jealous Pat confronts her.

After Jim turns down Colonna a second time, his nightclub and two of his casinos are wrecked, but he remains defiant.

Peter Willens asks Susan to try to persuade Jim to invest in a gold mine which promoter Richard Farning claims is in need of funds to exploit a newly found deposit. Over the strenuous objections of Dave, Jim sells out to the Colonnas and liquidates the rest of his assets. However, the gold mine is soon revealed to be a scam. Jim, who has avoided liquor because it unleashes his vicious temper, starts drinking heavily.

Meanwhile, Jacko tips off the police to the gambling establishments, then lies to Arturo Colonna and tells him Jim is responsible for the police raids. When Angelo Colonna and a reluctant Jacko go to Jim's home, he is not there, but Dave is; Angelo unintentionally kills him. When Jim finds out, he seeks revenge. Pat follows him to the Colonnas. A shootout ensues, and Jacko and Angelo are both killed. Jim is shot in the arm, but gets away and ends up in the street. Pat runs him down with her car. Susan and Jim's butler arrive; it is unclear whether Jim is dead or alive, but they carry him home.

== Cast ==
- Dane Clark as Jim Forster
- Kathleen Byron as Pat
- Naomi Chance as Lady Susan Willens
- Meredith Edwards as Dave Davies
- Anthony Forwood as Lord Peter Willens
- Eric Pohlmann as Arturo Colonna
- Anthony Ireland as Richard Farning
- Max Bacon as Maxie
- Mona Washbourne as Miss Minter
- Jane Griffiths as Lady Jane Greer
- Richard Shaw as Louis
- Julian Somers as Licasi
- George Pastell as Jacko Spina
- Enzo Coticchia as Angelo Colonna
- Hal Osmond as stable groom
- Percy Marmont as Lord Willens-Hortland
- Felix Felton as boxing promoter

== Reception ==
The Monthly Film Bulletin wrote: "A melodrama with some unconvincing American-style gangsters and a very odd picture of the society world which Forster tries to gate-crash. Dane Clark deserves something rather better."

Kine Weekly wrote: "The picture attempts to capture both the British and the American markets, but its cast, to say nothing of its plot, is not sufficiently strong seriously to compete with authentic Hollywood gangster fare. Here and there, Dane Clark whips up a little excitement, but most of its fights and shooting affrays lack fire and purpose. Its heart interest also fails to arrive at worthwhile conclusions. Indecisive, it loads the dice against itself. The pay-off is well mounted, yet definitely minor 'melo'."

Picture Show called the film a "well-staged melodrama, set in the questionable part of Soho."

The Radio Times Guide to Films gave the film 2/5 stars, writing: "What went on behind the scenes of this Hammer production is far more interesting than the on-screen action. Although Pat Jenkins has his name on the picture, a variety of sources claim that Hollywood hack Sam Newfield co-directed; others assert that horror maestro Terence Fisher also had a hand in its making. The film itself is an unremarkable crime tale."

In British Sound Films: The Studio Years 1928–1959 David Quinlan rated the film as "mediocre", writing: "Unconvincingly set drama, typical Dane Clark gloom."
