= Desperate Moment =

1953 British film by Compton Bennett

- British quad poster
- Directed by: Compton Bennett
- Written by: George H. Brown; Patrick Kirwan
- Based on: Desperate Moment by Martha Albrand
- Produced by: George H. Brown
- Starring: Dirk Bogarde; Mai Zetterling; Philip Friend
- Cinematography: C.M. Pennington-Richards
- Edited by: John D. Guthridge
- Music by: Ronald Binge
- Production companies: Fanfare Films; British Film-Makers
- Distributed by: General Film Distributors (UK); Universal Pictures (US)
- Release dates: 17 March 1953 (London, UK)
- Running time: 88 minutes
- Country: United Kingdom
- Language: English

Desperate Moment is a 1953 British thriller film directed by Compton Bennett and starring Dirk Bogarde, Mai Zetterling and Philip Friend. It was written by George H. Brown and Patrick Kirwan based on the 1951 novel of the same title by Martha Albrand.

== Plot ==
In the years immediately after World War II, a Dutchman, ex resistance, is sentenced to life imprisonment for a murder, committed during a robbery, that he confessed to but did not commit. After discovering that the girl he has loved since childhood is not dead, as he had been told, he escapes from prison and goes on the run through a devastated Germany in search of the witnesses who can clear him, with her help. But the witnesses begin to die apparently accidental deaths shortly before he finds them...

== Cast ==
- Dirk Bogarde as Simon Van Halder
- Mai Zetterling as Anna DeBurg
- Philip Friend as Captain Bob Sawyer
- Albert Lieven as Paul Ravitch
- Fritz Wendhausen as Warder Goeter
- Carl Jaffe as Becker
- Gerard Heinz as German prison doctor
- André Mikhelson as Polizei Inspector
- Harold Ayer as Captain Trevor Wood
- Walter Gotell as Ravitch's Servant-Henchman
- Friedrich Joloff as Valentin Vladek
- Simone Silva as Mink, Valentin's girl
- Ferdy Mayne as Detective Laurence
- Walter Rilla as Colonel Bertrand, Dutch consulate
- Antonio Gallardo as Spanish dancer
- Paul Hardtmuth as wharf watchman
- Theodore Bikel as Anton Meyer

== Production ==
Producer George H. Brown bought the film rights to the novel in 1951 and promised the lead role to Dirk Bogarde. Bogarde had prior commitments so Brown delayed filming for a year until the actor could play the part. Brown called the love scenes "the most tender I have read for a long time."

The film was made through British Film-Makers, a short lived production scheme that operated in Britain in the early 1950s as a co operative venture between the Rank Organisation and the National Film Finance Corporation (NFFC), whereby Rank would provide 70% of finance and the rest came from the NFFC.

Dirk Bogarde's biographer called the film one of Bogarde's "seemingly unending supply of men-on-the-run " movies that followed his success in The Blue Lamp, others including Blackmailed, Hunted and The Gentle Gunman.

Filming started in September 1952. It was made at Pinewood Studios and on location in West Germany including scenes shot at Berlin's Brandenburg Gate. The film's sets were designed by the art director Maurice Carter.

== Critical reception ==
Variety wrote, "There is ample suspense and action... to compensate for some of the weaknesses in plot construction. The German location provides the right atmosphere."

The Monthly Film Bulletin wrote: "It is impossible to say anything good of this rigmarole, with its improbably contrived story, its flat dialogue and direction, its lachrymose performance by Mai Zetterling and characteristically bedraggled and hunted appearance by Dirk Bogarde. All the villains are old-fashioned stock characters, and nothing seems to bear any relation to life as it exists."

The New York Times wrote, "the sum and substance of this production...is a great deal of panting exercise within and all over two cities, offering little about which to care."

Filmknk called it " a little dull, despite Mai Zetterling and German location filming."

TV Guide found it "quite suspenseful, with Bogarde turning in an exceptionally fine performance."

In The Radio Times Guide to Films Tony Sloman gave the film 3/5 stars, writing: "This was one of several films in which handsome young Dirk Bogarde played a fugitive on the run, prior to consolidating his popularity and stardom with the following year's Doctor in the House. The meaningless title conceals a ludicrous plot in which Bogarde, believing girlfriend Mai Zetterling is dead, confesses to a murder he did not commit. When he discovers she is still alive, they go off to catch the real villain. The stars make it entertaining enough."

Leslie Halliwell wrote "Cliché-ridden melodrama climaxing in a car chase; poor in all departments."
