= Duel of Angels =

- Written by: Jean Giraudoux
- Characters: Joseph, Marcellus, Paola, Armand, Lucile, Eugenie, Mr Justice Blanchard, Barbette
- Original language: French
- Subject: A faithful wife is betrayed and driven to suicide.
- Genre: Drama
- Setting: Aix-en-Provence, France; Summer, 1868

Premiere
- Date premiered: 4 November 1953
- Place premiered: Marigny Theatre in Paris

Duel of Angels (1963) is an English-language adaptation by Christopher Fry of the play Pour Lucrèce (1944) by French dramatist Jean Giraudoux. The play is based on the story of Lucretia, the virtuous Roman housewife who was raped and, finding no support from her husband and his friends, is driven to suicide. This is the same legend that was used by Shakespeare in The Rape of Lucrece. Giraudoux gives the Roman legend a new locale, setting his drama in nineteenth-century Aix-en-Provence in southern France.

== Original productions ==
Pour Lucrèce was translated into English as Duel of Angels by Christopher Fry, in The Drama of Jean Giraudoux, vol. 1 (1963).

Pour Lucrèce was not performed until nine years after the author's death on 4 November 1953 in Paris at the Marigny Theatre in a production by Jean-Louis Barrault.

Duel of Angels opened on 24 April 1958 at the Apollo Theatre in a production directed by Jean-Louis Barrault, and starring Vivien Leigh, Claire Bloom (later replaced by Ann Todd and Mary Ure), Derek Nimmo and Peter Wyngarde. Leigh again played the role of Paola in a production opening on 19 April 1960 at the Helen Hayes Theatre in New York City, directed by Robert Helpmann, and also featuring Peter Wyngarde, Jack Merivale and Mary Ure.

Jean-Luc Godard wanted to film Pour Lucrèce in 1962 starring Sami Frey, Charles Denner, and Michel Piccoli, with an unknown actress (probably Nicole Bellac) as the female lead, but when cast and crew had already been assembled in September he called off the shoot on the first day of filming after a prolonged downpour caused a long delay.
