= Sonya Hana =

British ballerina and actress

Daily Mirror, 1951

Sonya Hana, Lady Wright (9 January 1927 – 24 July 2007) was a British ballerina and actress.

== Biography ==
She was born in England to a Japanese father and an English mother and raised at 69 Kinnerton Street in Knightsbridge by her mother. She only met her father once; he was a Tokyo banker and at one point president of the Yokohama Specie Bank. She left school during World War II. At age 14, she starting training in dance with Lydia Kyasht and Audrey DeVos.

For a short time, she was a member of the Sadler's Wells Theatre Ballet but soon the appeal on musicals led her into productions such as The King and I.

Hana married director and choreographer Sir Peter Wright in 1954. The couple had a daughter Poppy (born 1957) and a son Jonathan (born 1959). They initially lived on Lillington Street in Pimlico and then Finchley. After returning from a two-year stint in Stuttgart, the family settled in a renovated cottage on Totteridge Green. After their children left home, they moved to Hampstead, Camden and finally Chiswick. Hana died on 24 July 2007, aged 80.

== Filmography ==
- A Bullet in the Ballet (1947)
- The Planter's Wife, as Ah Moy (1952)
- Colonel March Investigates (1953)
- Death in the Dressing Room (1954)
- The Cruel Test, as Lanna (1955)
- Madam Butterfly as Butterfly (1957)
