= Martha Albrand =

German-American novelist (1914–1981)

- Born: Heidi Huberta Freybe Loewengard; 1914; Rostock
- Died: 24 June 1981 (age 66); New York
- Occupation: German-American novelist
- Writing career
- Pen name: Holland, Katrin; Lambert, Christine; Katrin J. Lamon; Heidi Huberta Freybe Loewengard
- Notable awards: Grand Prix de Littérature Policière

Martha Albrand (1910–1981), born Heidi Huberta Freybe was a German-American novelist. Albrand was the name of her Danish great-grandfather.

She was the sister of the actress Jutta Freybe and the writer Johanna Sibelius.

The film Captain Carey, U.S.A. was based on her novel After Midnight.

In 1950, the book After Midnight won the Grand Prix de Littérature Policière International Prize, the most prestigious award for crime and detective fiction in France.

== Bibliography ==
=== Novels written as Katrin Holland ===
- Man spricht über Jacqueline, 1926
- Wie macht man das nur ???, 1930
- Unterwegs zu Alexander: Ein Liebesroman, 1932
- Die silberne Wolke: Ein Roman aus unserer Zeit, 1933
- Babett auf Gottes Gnaden, 1934
- Das Mädchen, das niemand mochte, 1935
- Das Frauenhaus, 1935
- Carlotta Torresani, 1938
- Einsamer Himmel, 1938
- Vierzehn Tage mit Edita, 1939
- Helene, 1940
- The Obsession of Emmet Booth, 1957

=== Novels written as Martha Albrand ===
- No Surrender, 1942
- Without Orders, 1943
- Endure No Longer, 1944
- None Shall Know, 1945
- Remembered Anger, 1946
- Whispering Hill, 1947
- After Midnight, 1948
- Wait for the Dawn, 1950
- Desperate Moment, 1951
- The Hunted Woman, 1953
- Nightmare in Copenhagen, 1954
- The Mask of Alexander, 1955
- The Story That Could Not Be Told, 1956 (alternative title The Linden)
- A Day in Monte Carlo, 1959
- Meet Me Tonight, 1960 (alternative title Return to Terror)
- A Call from Austria, 1963
- The Door fell Shut, 1966
- Rhine Replica, 1969
- Manhattan North, 1971
- Zurich/AZ 900, 1974
- A Taste of Terror, 1976
- Intermission, 1978 (alternative title Final Encore)

=== Novels written as Christine Lambert ===
- The Ball, 1961
- A Sudden Woman, 1964

== Filmography ==
- Die Nacht der großen Liebe (Germany, 1933)
- Talking About Jacqueline (Germany, 1937, based on Man spricht über Jacqueline)
- Talk About Jacqueline (UK, 1942, based on Man spricht über Jacqueline)
- Captain Carey, U.S.A. (1950, based on After Midnight)
- Desperate Moment (UK, 1953, based on Desperate Moment)
