= Venetian Bird (novel) =

1950 novel by Victor Canning

- First edition cover (showing the Lion of Venice)
- Author: Victor Canning
- Language: English
- Genre: Thriller
- Publisher: Hodder & Stoughton
- Publication date: 1950
- Publication place: United Kingdom
- Media type: Print

Venetian Bird is a 1950 thriller novel by the British writer Victor Canning.

== Film adaptation ==
In 1952 the story was turned into a film directed by Ralph Thomas and starring Richard Todd, Eva Bartok and Margot Grahame, with Canning adapting his own novel for the screenplay. In 1975, the novel was adapted by screenwriter Alfred Hayes into a two-part, eighth season episode of the CBS private eye TV series Mannix entitled "Bird of Prey". It was shot on Catalina island, doubling for a fictional Latin American country. Most of the characters remain the same while Joe Mannix replaces Richard Mercer from the novel.

== Bibliography ==
- Goble, Alan. The Complete Index to Literary Sources in Film. Walter de Gruyter, 1999.
