= One Good Turn (1955 film) =

1955 British film directed by John Paddy Carstairs

- Original UK Quad poster
- Directed by: John Paddy Carstairs
- Written by: Maurice Cowan; John Paddy Carstairs; Ted Willis; Sid Colin (additional scenes); Talbot Rothwell(additional scenes)
- Produced by: Maurice Cowan
- Starring: Norman Wisdom; Joan Rice; Shirley Abicair; Thora Hird
- Cinematography: Jack E. Cox
- Edited by: Geoffrey Foot
- Music by: John Addison
- Production company: Two Cities Films
- Distributed by: General Film Distributors
- Release date: 4 January 1955
- Running time: 90 minutes
- Country: United Kingdom
- Language: English

One Good Turn is a 1955 British comedy film directed by John Paddy Carstairs and starring Norman Wisdom, Joan Rice, Shirley Abicair and Thora Hird. It was written by Maurice Cowan, Carstairs, Ted Willis, Sid Colin and Talbot Rothwell.

The main setting of the film is an English children's home, located south of London.

== Plot ==
Norman lives at Greenwood children's home, south of London, where he grew up. He has stayed on and serves as carer and general dogsbody. He regards the staff and children there as his family, and when Jimmy, one of the boys, sets his heart on a model car which he has seen in a shop window, Norman is determined to raise the money to buy it. But he cannot afford it on his meagre wages, and Matron refuses to provide the money.

Norman joins the schoolchildren on a train excursion to Brighton, as he has never seen the sea. However, he loses his trousers before boarding. On leaving the train, he is chased by the police and disguises his appearance by joining the final stage of the London to Brighton walking race. Due to his advantage in joining so late, he wins, but fails to sell the silver cup he has been awarded to a pawnbroker, who thinks the trophy has been stolen. Norman acquires a top hat and tails and is eating candy floss by a stage door. The manager comes out searching for the orchestra conductor and mistakes Norman as the missing man (his candy floss stick look like a baton). Norman creates a disjointed performance and starts laughing. The laughter is infectious and soon the whole audience is laughing. After a short section of normality where the orchestra play Lohengrin Norman decides to move to big band music.

At this point the real conductor arrives and Norman tries to hide. As the orchestra play the William Tell Overture Norman runs around and causes chaos.

At a local fair, he sees he can win £10 by lasting three rounds in a boxing tent. He gets hypnotised to make himself a good boxer. This is succeeding but both the boxing and hypnotism are scams so they cheat him out of the money. The audience have seen what happened and have a whip-round for him, which raises fifteen shillings. Norman bursts into song as he stands by a cupie doll game at the fair. He gets enough money to buy the pedal car but a misunderstanding as it leaves the shop window leads to another police pursuit.

Norman returns to the Home, but finds it in a state of siege. The chairman of the trustees is also a crooked property speculator and wants to evict the kids so that a factory can be built on the site. The children defenders are successful and the home is saved. Little Jimmy says he no longer wants the car as he has been given a model plane.

== Cast ==
- Norman Wisdom as Norman
- Joan Rice as Iris Gibson
- Shirley Abicair as Mary
- Thora Hird as Cook
- William Russell as Alec Bigley
- Joan Ingram as Matron Sparrow
- Richard Caldicot as Mr. Bigley
- Marjorie Fender as Tuppeny
- Keith Gilman as Jimmy
- Noel Howlett as jeweller
- David Hurst as Professor Dofee
- Harold Kasket as Igor Petrovitch
- Ricky McCullough as Gunner Mac
- Anthony Green as Martin

== Production ==
Producer Maurice Cowan made Wisdom's first film and wrote the story for his third. He so disliked working with Wisdom on this film that he never produced another film for the comedian.

According to Hugh Stewart, who became Wisdom's main producer, the film "was not particularly good. Paddy - who is very expert but only gets annoyed with people when they really don't know what they're talking about, wouldn't tolerate another film with Maurice."

== Reception ==
The film was the 7th most popular movie at the British box office in 1955. According to Kinematograph Weekly it was a "money maker" at the British box office in 1955.

The Monthly Film Bulletin wrote: "Norman Wisdom's early television work raised the hope that he might prove an outstanding clown; and his first film, Trouble in Store, did not entirely destroy the hope. His handling in this film, however, is almost fatal to his individual gifts. The attempt to exploit the pathetic quality which once arose easily and naturally from his comedy here results in a mawkish, tasteless pathos, deliberately imposed from outside, and crudely using such obvious devices as orphans, crying children and a coloured infant. Wisdom has one or two scenes of pure slapstick of some virtue – one, for example, where he inadvertently conducts an orchestra with the sticky candy-floss stick which he is desperately trying to detach from his fingers; another with a wasp in a railway carriage. But these moments are too few to compensate for the roughness of the rest of the film, the inconsequentialities of the plot, or the waste of such pleasant personalities as Thora Hird, Shirley Abicair and David Hurst."

Tony Sloman wrote in the Radio Times: "This is the cleverly constructed follow-up to Norman Wisdom's smash-hit debut Trouble in Store. Arguably the best of his vehicles ... Of course, the film is overly sentimental, but sentiment was part of Wisdom's stock-in-trade, and today, if we can look beyond the home-grown schmaltz, we can recognise the rare quality of a true cinematic clown".
