= National Film Finance Corporation =

UK film funding agency (1945–1985)

The National Film Finance Corporation (NFFC) was a film funding agency in the United Kingdom in operation from 1949 until 1985. The NFFC was established by the Cinematograph Film Production (Special Loans) Act 1949 (12, 13 & 14 Geo. 6. c. 20), and further enhanced by the Cinematograph Film Production (Special Loans) Act 1952 (15 & 16 Geo. 6 & 1 Eliz. 2. c. 20), which gave the NFFC the power to borrow from sources other than the Board of Trade. The NFFC was abolished by the Films Act 1985 (c. 21).

== Overview ==
Lawyer John Terry (later Sir John Terry) served as manager of the NFFC for two decades, from 1958 to 1978. During his tenure, he helped secure financial backing for hundreds of films, launching the careers of figures such as director Ridley Scott and producer David Puttnam, among others.

Originally established as a lender of last resort for the British film industry, the NFFC’s operations shifted in the early 1970s after government funding was reduced. It began functioning as a consortium involving commercial partners, including National Westminster Bank, which became a major investor. This transition led the NFFC to adopt more commercially driven criteria for selecting projects.

In 1979, film-maker Mamoun Hassan succeeded Terry as head of the NFFC and introduced significant changes to its direction. Writing in the Financial Times, Nigel Andrews described him as “the nearest thing to a whizz-kid that this country's film establishment has yet produced,” noting his international background and spirited defense of his new policies.

Before Hassan’s departure, film critic David Robinson of The Times wrote that “Hassan's five and a half years at the Corporation have been characterized by independence and vim. His enthusiasm, pugnacity, taste, and passionate championing of an indigenous cinema have made him a significant figure in the progressive areas of British cinema.”

Hassan left the NFFC in 1984 to return to film production.

== See also ==
- Eady Levy
