= Juke Box Jury =

- Genre: Music
- Created by: Peter Potter
- Presented by: David Jacobs (1959–1967); Noel Edmonds (1979); Jools Holland (1989–1990)
- Opening theme: "Hit and Miss" by John Barry
- Country of origin: United Kingdom
- Original language: English

Original release
- Network: BBC1 (Note: Known as BBC Television Service until 1960, then BBC Television until 1964)
- Release: 1 June 1959 – 27 December 1967
- Release: 16 June – 18 August 1979
- Network: BBC Two
- Release: 24 September 1989 – 25 November 1990

Related
- Jukebox Jury; Drumbeat

Juke Box Jury is a music panel show which was broadcast on BBC Television between 1 June 1959 and 27 December 1967. The programme is based on the American show Jukebox Jury, itself an offshoot of a long-running radio series. The American series, which was televised, aired from 1953 to 1959 and was hosted by Peter Potter, Suzanne Alexander, Jean Moorhead, and Lisa Davis.

The series featured celebrity showbusiness guests on a rotating weekly panel who were asked to judge the hit potential of recent record releases. By 1962 the programme was attracting 12 million viewers weekly on Saturday nights.

The concept was later revived by the BBC for one series in 1979 and a further two series in 1989–1990.

== Format ==
Juke Box Jury took a TV format where a guest panel reviewed new record releases in a 25-minute programme, extended to an hour for some Christmas shows. The format was drawn from that of the US TV series, Jukebox Jury. Host David Jacobs each week asked four celebrities (the 'Jurors') to judge newly released records on his jukebox (a Rock-Ola Tempo II) and forecast which would be declared a "hit" or a "miss" – the decision accompanied by either a bell for a 'hit' or a hooter for a 'miss'. A panel of three members of the audience voted as a tie-breaker if the guests' decision was deadlocked, by holding up a large circular disc with 'Hit' on one side and 'Miss' on the other. Most weeks the performers of one of the records would be hidden behind a screen and emerge to "surprise" the panel after they had given their verdict.

The series was usually broadcast from the BBC TV Theatre, Shepherd's Bush Green, London. Each programme normally consisted of between seven and nine records. Those editions which were pre-recorded normally followed a live transmission, and broadcast in the regular slot.

== History ==
=== 1959–1967 ===
Juke Box Jury was first broadcast on BBC Television on 1 June 1959. Originally on Monday evenings, the BBC show was moved to early Saturday evenings starting on 3 September 1959, because of its immediate popularity. The series was produced by Russell Turner.

The original panel consisted of Pete Murray, Alma Cogan, Gary Miller and Susan Stranks, who gave a 'teenager's view'. Murray appeared every week for the first 11 episodes; however, generally the panel of judges changed from week to week and featured mainly current stars from music, television and film. The panel normally comprised two male and two female guests, many of whom appeared more than once. Singers Gary Miller and Alma Cogan were regular panellists in the early shows. Actor Eric Sykes was often a panellist and Katie Boyle was a frequent Juror (appearing at least 37 times), as were Lulu and Cilla Black, who appeared twelve and nine times respectively. From 31 December 1966, a regular panel was established for eight consecutive editions. Jimmy Savile, Simon Dee, Alan Freeman and Pete Murray sat in judgement for all these programmes, having first appeared together on 3 December 1966. From 25 February until 1 April, the foursome continued as regular panellists, but alternating in pairs each week, with Savile and Murray appearing together, followed by Freeman and Dee. Among the diverse others from the world of entertainment who appeared were Thora Hird, Alfred Hitchcock, Spike Milligan, Lonnie Donegan, Johnny Mathis, Roy Orbison and David McCallum.

By October 1959 Juke Box Jury had reached a weekly audience of almost 9 million viewers. Bill Cotton took over production of the series during 1960, to be followed later in the year by Stewart Morris and then Neville Wortman, who was to remain the producer until the series ended in 1967.

On 7 December 1963, the panel was the four Beatles, while George Harrison and Ringo Starr both appeared separately later, as did their manager Brian Epstein, who was twice a panellist. John Lennon had already appeared on 29 June 1963. Then on 4 July 1964 the five members of the Rolling Stones formed the panel, the only time there were more than four Jurors on the programme. Keith Richards later wrote of this appearance: "We didn't give a shit.... We just trashed every record they played."

By early 1962, Juke Box Jury had a weekly audience of over 12 million viewers, while the Beatles appearance on 7 December 1963 garnered an audience of 23 million, and news of the Rolling Stones' appearance the following June garnered 10,000 applications to the BBC for tickets for the recording. The attraction of the programme deftly crossed generational boundaries – younger viewers revelling in the appearance of their current pop stars, while older adults identified with the often anti-pop sentiments of the panellists from a non-musical or older background, confirming "adult and youthful prejudices at the same time"'.

In January 1967, the Sunday tabloid newspaper News of the World in a series of attacks on the new hippy sub-culture and LSD, castigated David Jacobs in one article for playing the Mothers of Invention single "It Can't Happen Here" on a Juke Box Jury broadcast in November 1966 as it was 'recorded on a trip', and also blamed two of the jury for voting it a hit. The jury on this occasion included Bobby Goldsboro, Susan Maughan and comedian Ted Rogers. In fact, by the time of the article, the BBC had already cut seven minutes from the 7 January 1967 programme because of drug references in one of that week's chosen songs, "The Addicted Man" by the Game, which had resulted in universal disapproval by the Jurors during an extended discussion. This was part of a new policy for the programme during its last year of broadcast, when a regular panel of four disc jockeys was introduced, with a more detailed discussion of each song.

On 24 December 1966 and again on 5 August 1967 the Seekers became only the fourth band to appear as Jurors in the series, appearing just a few weeks after The Bachelors. The programme had by this time seen a drop in ratings, and from 27 September 1967 Juke Box Jury was moved from its prime place in the Saturday evening schedules and transmitted on early Wednesday evenings, replaced in the key Saturday slot by Dee Time. On November 8, 1967, the scheduled edition of the show was cancelled without notice, leading to speculation the show was to end. At the end of 1967, Juke Box Jury was dropped from the BBC schedule because of its falling ratings, and the last broadcast was on 27 December 1967, with original Jurors Pete Murray and Susan Stranks appearing once more.

David Jacobs hosted a one off Juke Box Jury in 1989 to mark the centenary of the phonograph. Pete Murray was on the panel.

=== Post-1967 ===
The programme has been revived twice, first in 1979 with Noel Edmonds as presenter, and then with Jools Holland for two seasons in 1989–1990, ending on 25 November 1990. Frequent jurors from the original run Katie Boyle & Lulu both returned for the Jools Holland era, which also included impressionist Steve Nallon on the panel impersonating the sitting prime minister Margaret Thatcher. The 1979 series was most notable for a panel containing Johnny Rotten (John Lydon), who gave a characteristically acerbic performance before walking out before the end of 30 June 1979 programme.

The final televised edition of Juke Box Jury aired on BBC2 on 25 November 1990. Dusty Springfield was on the final panel, joining Alan Freeman who appeared on 30 September 1990, as the only personalities to feature as jurors in all three eras of the television run. Lulu appeared in the 1990s run, but was not a juror during the 1979 series, although her single "I Love To Boogie" was featured in the series; where it was erroneously judged to be a likely hit.

BBC Radio Merseyside has run a radio version of Juke Box Jury for some years, hosted by Spencer Leigh and normally broadcast under the programme name On The Beat although it is often scheduled as Juke Box Jury. The broadcaster Chris Evans also ran a variation of the format in 2008 on his BBC Radio 2 Chris Evans Drivetime programme, where listeners were invited to text either 'hit' or 'miss', plus their comments, to the programme.

The format also crossed over into children's television on Going Live! and later Live and Kicking having a segment entitled 'Trev and Simon's Video Galleon" (also Garden/Goldmine and Grandprix).

== Surviving recordings ==
Because of the BBC's policy of wiping tapes of its programmes in the 1960s, and the practice of not recording live programmes, only two episodes (29 October 1960 and 12 November 1960) are thought to still exist in their complete form, although transcripts also exist of the Beatles' appearances – both solo and together. In 2001, during a year-long drive to find lost archive material, the BBC announced that an audio recording of the Beatles' appearance in December 1963 had re-surfaced, a tape taken directly from the television broadcast.

== Theme music ==
For the first six weeks of the programme, the theme to Juke Box Jury was "Juke Box Fury", written by composer and arranger Tony Osborne and recorded by his band under the name Ozzie Warlock and the Wizards.

The programme's producer Russell Turner then replaced the theme with another instrumental, "Hit and Miss", performed by the John Barry Seven Plus Four, which remained the title music from 1960 to 1967. For the last few months of the original series this was replaced by a version recorded by the Ted Heath Band.

The 1989–1990 Jools Holland series also featured "Hit and Miss", this time recorded by Courtney Pine.

== Cultural references ==
Juke Box Jury has a history of being parodied, and the format has been used a number of times for other programmes:

In 1959, the BBC refused Tommy Steele permission to use David Jacobs in a Juke Box Jury comedy sketch for his Tommy Steele Show on ATV. The sketch went ahead in October 1959 with another BBC personality, announcer McDonald Hobley taking Jacobs' part.

Benny Hill parodied the show as 'Soap Box Jury' on a show for the BBC on 4 March 1961. He impersonated David Jacobs and the panellists, one of whom was called "Fred Curry", a takeoff on Pete Murray and another "Lady Edgware", a takeoff on Lady Isobel Barnett – the joke being that Barnet and Edgware are neighbouring London suburbs. The sketch ended with a shot of Hill as all four panellists in one shot, achieved through filming each "panellist" separately and keeping the other three-fourths of the lens covered, which made this a landmark in both Hill's career and the development of television production. The sketch can be seen on the DVD compilation Benny Hill: The Lost Years, which was released in 2005.

Also in 1961, comedian Jimmy Edwards promoted a tea-shop band 'The Burke Adams Tea-Time Three', who had a record judged a hit on Juke Box Jury, in "The Face of Enthusiasm", part of his Faces of Jim comedy series.

Finnish television ran its own version of Juke Box Jury called Levyraati. The Finnish version long outlasted Juke Box Jury – it ran from 1961 to 1992, and has both been revived since, and also re-imagined as Videoraati by Finnish cable TV channel MoonTV.

On 7 July 1962, BBC TV broadcast "Twist Music With a Beat", a pop music programme about the dance craze 'The Twist', featuring a Twist competition between Juke Box Jury members and members of the cast of Compact. The show featured Petula Clark, Don Lang & His Twisters, Tony Osborne & His Mellow Men and the Viscounts.

A ten-minute version of Juke Box Jury also featured as part of a regular 1960s BBC Christmas Day variety show Christmas Night with the Stars on Christmas Day 1962 and 1963.

The 1963 Gordon Flemyng film about the pop music industry Just For Fun had a Juke Box Jury section which featured David Jacobs in his usual host position while Jimmy Savile, Alan Freeman and Dick Emery played the jury panel. The film was scripted by Milton Subotsky, who was one of the earliest guests on the programme.

In 1964, the Rolling Stones recorded an advert for the breakfast cereal Rice Krispies, which used themes from the programme including a jukebox, studio audience scenes and both the 'Hit' button and the 'Hit' signs that the audience jury used.

The British comedy duo French and Saunders, who appeared on the programme in 1989, referred to Juke Box Jury in their parody of What Ever Happened to Baby Jane? in their eponymous 1990 comedy series.

The Generation X 1978 song "Ready Steady Go!" referenced the programme in its lyrics: "I'm not in love with Juke Box Jury/I'm not in love with Thank Your Lucky Stars".

Ian Dury and The Blockheads named their November 1981 album, Juke Box Dury.

In 1989, BBC TV's Arena produced a programme titled "Juke Box Jury" to commemorate the centenary of the jukebox. Hosted by David Jacobs, it also featured Juke Box Jury regulars Pete Murray and Dusty Springfield, with Phil Collins and Sarah Jane Morris making up the rest of the team.

The Late Show programme, "Classical Juke Box Jury" (1990) was a spoof of Juke Box Jury, in which a panel of three people with a background in classical music voted on different versions of Beethoven's 9th Symphony by a variety of conductors.

== Jurors ==
An incomplete list of the guest panellists. Each week had four guest 'Jurors', often plus one surprise artist chosen from among the records played that week.

=== 1959–1967 ===
David Jacobs was host throughout the series 1959–1967, with regular panellist Pete Murray standing in on a number of occasions.

1959

- 1 June 1959 – Pete Murray, Alma Cogan, Gary Miller, Susan Stranks
- 8 June 1959 – Pete Murray, Gary Miller, Alma Cogan, Susan Stranks
- 15 June 1959 – Alma Cogan, Gary Miller, Mandy Miller, Pete Murray
- 22 June 1959 – Eric Sykes, Shani Wallis, Pete Murray, Susan Stranks
- 6 July 1959 – Eric Sykes, Shani Wallis, Mandy Miller, Pete Murray
- 13 July 1959 – Eric Sykes, Petula Clark, Pete Murray, Susan Stranks
- 27 July 1959 – Petula Clark, Eric Sykes, Pete Murray, Susan Stranks
- 10 August 1959 – Eric Sykes, Pete Murray, Jill Chadwick, The Poni-Tails
- 17 August 1959 – Diana Dors, Pete Murray, Sheila Dixon, Dickie Dawson
- 24 August 1959 – Venetia Stevenson, Pete Murray, Judy Carne, Dickie Dawson
- 5 September 1959 – Eric Sykes, Cleo Laine, Susan Stranks, Pete Murray
- 12 September 1959 – Peggy Cummins, Eric Sykes, Eric Robinson, Susan Stranks
- 19 September 1959 – Bill Maynard, Petula Clark, Judy Carne, Peter Noble
- 26 September 1959 – Richard Dawson, Diana Dors, Eunice Gayson, Tony Vlassopolu
- 3 October 1959 – Diana Dors, Tony Osborne, Dickie Dawson, Petula Clark
- 10 October 1959 – Gary Miller, Milton Subotsky, Venetia Stevenson, Gloria Kindersley
- 17 October 1959 – Digby Wolfe, Alma Cogan, Louie Ramsay, Jimmy Savile
- 24 October 1959 – Winifred Atwell, Paul Carpenter, Sandra Dorne, Digby Wolfe
- 31 October 1959 – Digby Wolfe, Gary Miller, Venetia Stevenson, Lynn Curtis
- 14 November 1959 – Gary Miller, Venetia Stevenson, Bunny Lewis, Jeanne Baldwin
- 21 November 1959 – Joan Heal, Venetia Stevenson, Milton Subotsky, Pete Murray
- 28 November 1959 – Digby Wolfe, Peter Noble, Judy Carne, Sylvie St. Clair
- 5 December 1959 – Russ Conway, Eric Sykes, Nancy Spain, Joan North
- 12 December 1959 – Russ Conway, Eric Sykes, Anthea Askey, Venetia Stevenson
- 19 December 1959 – Eric Sykes, Russ Conway, Katie Boyle, Patricia Bredin

1960

In addition to David Jacobs hosting, Vicki Smith was 'hostess' for the first few programmes.

- 2 January 1960 – Gilbert Harding, Peggy Cummins, Pete Murray, Carolyn Townshend
- 9 January 1960 – Gilbert Harding, Lionel Bart, Shirley Anne Field, Anita Prynne
- 16 January 1960 – Joni James, Anthea Askey, Eric Robinson, Jimmy Henney
- 23 January 1960 – Alan Freeman, Patricia Bredin, Katie Boyle, Cyril Shack
- 30 January 1960 – Shirley Eaton, Bunny Lewis, Frank Weir, Susan Stranks
- 6 February 1960 – Wolf Mankowitz, Michael Craig, Nancy Spain, Henrietta Tiarks
- 13 February 1960 – Pete Murray, Alan Freeman, Carolyn Townshend, Esmee Clinton
- 20 February 1960 – Ted Ray, Anthea Askey, Jeannette Sterk, Alan Freeman
- 27 February 1960 – Eric Sykes, Lorrae Desmond, Henrietta Tiarks, Alan Freeman
- 5 March 1960 – Spike Milligan, Jack Payne, Jacquay Kinson, Nancy Spain
- 12 March 1960 – Pete Murray, Paul Carpenter, Katie Boyle, June Sylvaine
- 19 March 1960 – Sam Costa, Ted Ray, Lord Donegall, Lee Hamilton
- 26 March 1960 – Pete Murray, Jack Payne, Jean Metcalfe, Alan Freeman
- 2 April 1960 – Frankie Day, Wolf Mankowitz, Eric Sykes, Katie Boyle
- 9 April 1960 – Hattie Jacques, Paul Carpenter, Nancy Spain, Eric Sykes
- 16 April 1960 – Anne Rogers, Eric Robinson, Sheila Gallagher, Gary Miller
- 23 April 1960 – Jack Payne, Eric Sykes, Pete Murray, David Hughes
- 30 April 1960 – Johnny Preston, Gary Miller, Humphrey Lyttelton, Buddy Kaye
- 7 May 1960 – Nancy Pederson, Karen Post, Doug Levy, Ed Robertson (Four Teenage students from the American Dependent High School, Bushy Park)
- 14 May 1960 – Katie Boyle, Russ Conway, Roy Castle, Jeannette Sterk
- 21 May 1960 – Jack Payne, Jean Metcalfe, Bunny Lewis, Viscountess Lewisham
- 4 June 1960 – Henrietta Tiarks, Ted Ray, Carole Carr, Pete Murray
- 11 June 1960 – Peter West, Dora Bryan, Judy Carne, Jimmy Henney
- 18 June 1960 – Digby Wolfe, Millicent Martin, Carole Carr, Eric Winstone
- 2 July 1960 – Carmen Dragon, Pete Murray, Anthea Askey, Ed Robertson
- 9 July 1960 – Katie Boyle, Peter Noble, Alan Dell, June Marlow
- 16 July 1960 – Katie Boyle, Judy Carne, Sid James, Eric Sykes
- 30 July 1960 – Arthur Askey, Anthea Askey, Peter Haigh, Susan Stranks
- 6 August 1960 – Stirling Moss, Kenneth Wolstenholme, Bunny Lewis, Judy Huxtable
- 13 August 1960 – Ted Heath, Millicent Martin, Pete Murray, Judy Thorburn
- 20 August 1960 – Dave King, Nancy Spain, Henrietta Tiarks, Alan Freeman
- 27 August 1960 – David Hughes, Sheila Buxton, Mildred Mayne, Lionel Bart
- 3 September 1960 – no programme due to Olympics coverage
- 10 September 1960 – Rosemary Squires, Paul Carpenter, Geoff Love, Annette Funicello
- 17 September 1960 – Capucine, Terence Morgan, Jimmy Henney, Toni Eden
- 24 September 1960 – Eric Sykes, Lita Roza, Katie Boyle, Don Moss
- 1 October 1960 – Eric Sykes, Petula Clark, George Chisholm, Judy Carne
- 8 October 1960 – Pete Murray, Katie Boyle, Janie Marden, Phil Foster
- 15 October 1960 – Sydney Shaw, Jill Day, Bunny Lewis, Shirley Bassey (Bassey revealed on air as a "surprise guest")
- 22 October 1960 – Eric Sykes, Carole Carr, Jimmy Henney and 'A Surprise Guest'
- 29 October 1960 – Carmen McRae, Pete Murray, Nancy Spain, Richard Wyler (surprise guest Ted Taylor)
- 5 November 1960 – Katie Boyle, Frank Muir, Denis Norden and 'A Surprise Guest'
- 12 November 1960 – Jill Ireland, David McCallum, Frederik van Pallandt and Nina van Pallandt (Nina & Frederik), Colin Day (Day revealed on air as a "surprise guest") This is one of the few surviving episodes: https://www.youtube.com/watch?v=b3y-wNnh3g0
- 19 November 1960 – Jeanne Carson, Sid James, Eric Sykes and a "surprise guest"
- 26 November 1960 – Marion Keene, Pete Murray, Paul Carpenter and a "surprise guest"
- 3 December 1960 – David Kossoff, Lita Roza, Richard Wyler and a "surprise guest"
- 10 December 1960 – Larry Adler, Susan Stranks, Godfrey Winn and a "surprise guest"
- 17 December 1960 – Anne Shelton, Barbara Sheller, Tony Osborne and a "surprise guest"
- 24 December 1960 – Peter Sellers, Russ Conway, Katie Boyle and a "surprise guest"
- 31 December 1960 – Denis Norden, Frank Muir, Beth Rogan and a "surprise guest"

1961

- 7 January 1961 – Lisa Gastoni, Jimmy Henney, Pete Murray and a "surprise guest"
- 14 January 1961 – Dick Bentley, Steve Race, Katie Boyle and a "surprise guest"
- 21 January 1961 – Dickie Valentine, Peggy Mount, Petula Clark and a "surprise guest"
- 28 January 1961 – Gloria DeHaven, Frankie Vaughan, Pete Murray and a "surprise guest" June Thorburn
- 4 February 1961 – Marion Ryan, Monty Babson, Keith Fordyce and a "surprise guest"
- 11 February 1961 – Sid James, Katie Boyle, David Kossoff and a "surprise guest" (possibly Mary Peach)
- 25 February 1961 – Lita Roza, Glen Mason, Susannah York and a "surprise guest"
- 4 March 1961 – Frankie Howerd, Shirley Abicair, David Gell and a "surprise guest"
- 11 March 1961 – Eric Sykes, Katie Boyle, Jimmy Young and a "surprise guest"
- 18 March 1961 – Glynis Johns, Lita Roza, Alan Freeman and a "surprise guest"
- 25 March 1961 – Lana Morris, Wolf Mankowitz, Ray Orchard and a "surprise guest"
- 1 April 1961 – Beatrice Lillie, Brian Mathew, Jean Bayless, Eric Sykes
- 8 April 1961 – Cliff Richard, Janet Munro, Ray Orchard and a "surprise guest"
- 15 April 1961 – Katie Boyle, Zena Marshall, Harry Robinson and Graham Hughes, a teenager from the audience, who was a guest
- 22 April 1961 – Jack Jackson, Ian Carmichael, Jill Brown, Frances Bennett
- 29 April 1961 – Arthur Askey, David Gell, Jane Murdoch and a "surprise guest"
- 6 May 1961 – Tony Bennett, June Thorburn, Eric Winstone and a "surprise guest"
- 13 May 1961 – Stubby Kaye, Katie Boyle, Bunny Lewis and a "surprise guest"
- 20 May 1961 – Feddie Mills, Jean Metcalfe, Michael Bentine and a "surprise guest"
- 27 May 1961 – Diane Todd, Jack Payne, Alan Freeman and a "surprise guest"
- 3 June 1961 – Russ Conway, Jack Jackson, Kim Tracy and a "surprise guest"
- 10 June 1961 – Sonya Cordeau, Robert Morley, Cliff Richard and a "surprise guest" Anthea Askey
- 17 June 1961 – Alma Cogan, Lonnie Donegan, Nelson Riddle and a "surprise guest" Mandy Miller
- 24 June 1961 – Shirley Bassey, Jack Jackson, Jimmy Henney and a "surprise guest" George Hamilton IV
- 1 July 1961 – Brian Matthew, Stubby Kaye, Sally Smith and a "surprise guest"
- 8 July 1961 – Sam Costa, Helen Winston, Jack Jackson and a "surprise guest"
- 15 July 1961 – Jimmy Young, Lana Morris, Paul Hollingdale and a "surprise guest"
- 22 July 1961 – Bunny Lewis, Katie Boyle, Eydie Gormé, Steve Lawrence
- 29 July 1961 – Spike Milligan, Benny Green, Eira Hughes and a "surprise guest"
- 5 August 1961 – Sammy Cahn, Jack Payne, Helen Shapiro and a "surprise guest"
- 12 August 1961 – Cliff Michelmore, Derek Hart, Fyfe Robertson, Kenneth Allsop
- 19 August 1961 – June Whitfield, Alan Freeman, Glen Mason and a "surprise guest"
- 26 August 1961 – Pete Murray, Jane Asher, John Paddy Carstairs and a "surprise guest"
- 2 September 1961 – Eric Sykes, Shirley Abicair, Scilla Gabel, Ray Orchard
- 9 September 1961 – Juliet Mills, David Kossoff, Jimmy Savile and a "surprise guest"
- 16 September 1961 – Shirley Anne Field, Matt Monro, Pete Murray and a "surprise guest"
- 23 September 1961 – Janet Munro, Cyril Ornadel, Jane Asher and a "surprise guest"
- 30 September 1961 – Howard Keel, Nicole Maurey, Jack Jackson and a "surprise guest"
- 7 October 1961 – Alan Dell, Anne Aubrey, Carole Carr and a "surprise guest"
- 14 October 1961 – Pete Murray, Muriel Young, Lew Luton and a "surprise guest"
- 21 October 1961 – Adam Faith, Alan Freeman, Helen Shapiro and a "surprise guest"
- 28 October 1961 – Jimmy Young, June Marlow, Bunny Lewis and a "surprise guest" Zsa Zsa Gabor
- 4 November 1961 – Julia Lockwood, Jackie Lane, Sam Costa and a "surprise guest"
- 11 November 1961 – John Leyton, Rita Tushingham, Leila Williams and a "surprise guest"
- 18 November 1961 – Petula Clark, Katie Boyle, Bunny Lewis and a "surprise guest"
- 25 November 1961 – Jack Jackson, Carole Carr, Morey Amsterdam and a "surprise guest"
- 2 December 1961 – Harry Fowler, Jill Browne, June Thorburn, Pete Murray
- 9 December 1961 – Acker Bilk, Jane Asher, Jimmy Edwards
- 16 December 1961 – Charlie Chester, Alan Dell, Sandy Scott, Barbara Shelley
- 23 December 1961 – Katie Boyle, Rosemary Squires, Arthur Askey, Jimmy Young
- 26 December 1961 – 'Christmas Special:' Jean Metcalfe, Haley Mills, Pete Murray, Alan Rothwell
- 30 December 1961 – Carole Carr, Anita Harris, Sid James, Bunny Lewis

1962

- 6 January 1962 – Sam Costa, Alan Freeman, Sandy Scott, Nancy Spain
- 13 January 1962 – Shirley Bassey, Susan Castle, Kenneth Hume, Ross Parker
- 20 January 1962 – Miriam Karlin, Alan Freeman, Jimmy Henney, June Thorburn
- 27 January 1962 – Shirley Eaton, Frank Muir, Pete Murray, Viera
- 3 February 1962 – Carole Carr, Denis Norden, Barbara Shelley and a "surprise guest"
- 10 February 1962 – Frances Bennett, Leslie Crowther, Alan Dell, Monica Evans
- 17 February 1962 – Petula Clark, George Elrick, Jean Metcalfe, Jimmy Young
- 24 February 1962 – Paul Anka, Tony Orlando, Sheila Tracy, Carole Carr
- 3 March 1962 – Buddy Greco, June Thorburn, Bobby Vee, Shani Wallis
- 10 March 1962 – Katie Boyle, Alan Freeman, Steve Race, Lita Roza
- 17 March 1962 – Carole Gray, Millicent Martin, Edward J. Mason, Ray Orchard
- 24 March 1962 – Jimmy Young, Carole Carr, Pete Murray, Barbara Shelley
- 31 March 1962 – Jane Asher, Alan Dell, Jimmy Henney, Jean Metcalfe
- 7 April 1962 – Jack Jackson, Sam Costa, June Marlow, Brenda Lee
- 14 April 1962 – Sid James, Miriam Karlin, Carole Carr, Robert Farnon
- 21 April 1962 – Nina & Frederik, Alma Cogan, Neil Sedaka
- 28 April 1962 – Alan Freeman, Jean Metcalfe, Katie Boyle, Johnny Burnette
- 5 May 1962 – Rosemary Squires, Dora Bryan, John Leyton, Pete Murray
- 12 May 1962 – Jean Metcalfe, Harry Rabinowitz, Leila Williams and a "surprise guest"
- 19 May 1962 – Steve Race, Sean Connery, Jane Asher, Janet Munro
- 26 May 1962 – Eartha Kitt, Rupert Davies, Jimmy Young, Vera Day
- 2 June 1962 – Alan Dell, Helen Shapiro, June Thorburn, Terry-Thomas
- 9 June 1962 – Dora Bryan, Anne Shelton, David Rose and a "surprise guest"
- 16 June 1962 – Nelson Riddle, Carole Carr, Anne Heywood and a "surprise guest"
- 23 June 1962 – Arthur Askey, Jean Metcalfe, Bill Crozier and a "surprise guest"
- 30 June 1962 – Stubby Kaye, Jimmy Henney, Jenny Angeloglou and a "surprise guest"
- 7 July 1962 – Rosemary Clooney, Roy Castle, Jane Asher and a "surprise guest"
- 14 July 1962 – Jack Jackson, Godfrey Winn, Katie Boyle and a "surprise guest"
- 21 July 1962 – Alan Freeman, Carole Carr, Gary Miller, Sheila Hancock
- 28 July 1962 – Alan Dell, Susan Stranks, Shirley Eaton and a "surprise guest" Jimmy Justice
- 4 August 1962 – Brian Rix, Jimmy Young, Rose Brennan and a "surprise guest" Susan Hampshire
- 11 August 1962 – Stubby Kaye, Juliet Mills, Nancy Spain, Bunny Lewis
- 18 August 1962 – Ray Conniff, Jean Metcalfe, Eric Sykes, Sylvia Syms
- 25 August 1962 – Dora Bryan, Jack Jackson, David Tomlinson and a "surprise guest" Malou Pantera
- 1 September 1962 – Katie Boyle, Jimmy Henney, Robert Morley, Elaine Stritch
- 8 September 1962 – Dick Emery, Maggie Fitzgibbon, Alan Freeman and a "surprise guest" Joan Darling
- 15 September 1962 – Rupert Davies, Dion, Fenella Fielding and a "surprise guest" Jane Asher
- 22 September 1962 – Ian Carmichael, Hy Hazell, Mike Sarne and a "surprise guest"
- 29 September 1962 – Liz Fraser, Stan Stennett, Tony Withers and a "surprise guest" Anne Shelton
- 6 October 1962 – Petula Clark, Hattie Jacques, Pete Murray, and a "surprise guest" Eric Sykes
- 13 October 1962 – Angela Huth, Sid James, Don Moss and a "surprise guest" Ketty Lester
- 20 October 1962 – Claire Bloom, Beryl Reid, Jimmy Young and a "surprise guest" Jess Conrad
- 27 October 1962 – Polly Elwes, Sid James, Steve Race and a "surprise guest" Beryl Bryden
- 3 November 1962 – Sam Costa, Pete Murray, June Thorburn and a "surprise guest"
- 10 November 1962 – Jane Asher, George Hamilton, Stubby Kaye and a "surprise guest' Catherine Boyle
- 17 November 1962 – Edie Adams, Alan Dell, and two "surprise guests" Ian Carmichael, Alexandra Bastedo
- 24 November 1962 – Jean Metcalfe, Dora Bryan, Kenneth More, Bobby Vee
- 1 December 1962 – Arthur Askey, Helen Shaprio and two "surprise guests" Johnny Mathis and Janette Scott
- 8 December 1962 – Carole Carr, Adam Faith, Edmund Purdom and a "surprise guest" Linda Ludgrove
- 15 December 1962 – Lonnie Donegan, Nancy Spain, Mai Zetterling and a "surprise guest" John Leyton
- 22 December 1962 – Alma Cogan, Sheila Hancock, David Tomlinson and a "surprise guest" Jack Jackson
- 25 December 1962 – "Christmas Night With The Stars" Special: Sid James, Sydney Tafler, Terry Scott, Hugh Lloyd, Jill Curzon
- 29 December 1962 – Shirley Anne Field, Robert Morley, Jimmy Young and a "surprise guest" Polly Elwes

1963

- 5 January 1963 – Alan Freeman, Spike Milligan, Anne Shelton and a "surprise guest" Layi Raki
- 12 January 1963 – Stubby Kaye, Pete Murray, Siân Phillips and a "surprise guest" Una Stubbs
- 19 January 1963 – Katie Boyle, Susan Maughan, Rolf Harris and a "surprise guest" Jack Jackson
- 26 January 1963 – Jane Asher, Carroll Baker, Brian Hyland, Pete Murray
- 2 February 1963 – Sean Connery, Diana Dors, Jean Metcalfe, Mike Sarne
- 9 February 1963 – Anthea Askey, Arthur Askey, Steve Rogers, Anne Rogers
- 16 February 1963 – Pete Murray, Robin Richmond, Annie Ross, Nancy Spain
- 2 March 1963 – Harry H. Corbett, Alan Dell, Dusty Springfield and a "surprise guest" Millicent Martin
- 9 March 1963 – Carole Carr, Spike Milligan, Chris Montez, Janette Scott
- 16 March 1963 – Katie Boyle, Angela Douglas, David Gell, Sid James
- 23 March 1963 – Jane Asher, Henry Mancini, Pete Murray and a "surprise guest" Marcie Blane
- 30 March 1963 – Jimmy Henney, Hattie Jacques, Eric Sykes, Margaret Whiting
- 6 April 1963 – Alan Freeman, Dolores Gray, Barbara Windsor, Jimmy Young
- 13 April 1963 – Arthur Askey, Steve Race, Sabrina, June Thorburn
- 20 April 1963 – Alan Dell, Louise Dunn, Harry Fowler, Julia Lockwood
- 27 April 1963 – Keith Fordyce, Sheila Hancock, Henry Mancini, Jean Metcalfe
- 4 May 1963 – Dora Bryan, Judith Chalmers, Pete Murray and a "surprise guest"
- 11 May 1963 – Carole Carr, Angela Douglas, Del Shannon, Johnny Tillotson
- 18 May 1963 – Jacqui Chan, Polly Elwes, Don Moss and a "surprise guest"
- 25 May 1963 – Eva Bartok, Sam Costa, Jimmy Henney, Nancy Spain
- 1 June 1963 – Tony Meehan, Barbara Murray, Pete Murray and a "surprise guest" Annie Ross
- 8 June 1963 – Liz Fraser, Millicent Martin, Lance Percival, Jimmy Young
- 15 June 1963 – Juliette Gréco, Jean Metcalfe, Peter Sellers, Maurice Woodruff
- 22 June 1963 – Jane Asher, Sandy Baron, Alan Dell, Dorothy Peterson
- 29 June 1963 – John Lennon, Katie Boyle, Bruce Prochnik, Caroline Maudling
- 6 July 1963 – Steve Race, Ian Carmichael, June Ritchie, Alma Cogan
- 13 July 1963 – Albert Finney, Esma Cannon, Pip Hinton, Bunny Lewis
- 20 July 1963 – Keith Fordyce, Frances Nuyen, Joan Sims, Kenneth Williams
- 27 July 1963 – Carol Deene, David Gell, Nancy Spain and a "surprise guest"
- 3 August 1963 – Jimmy Henney, Janette Scott, Angela Douglas, Jimmy Young
- 10 August 1963 – Carole Carr, Ted King, Barbara Windsor and a "surprise guest"
- 17 August 1963 – Pat Boone, Polly Elwes, Carole Ann Ford, Vic Lewis
- 24 August 1963 – Tom Courtenay, Little Peggy March, Peter Noble and a "surprise guest"
- 31 August 1963 – Terence Edmond, Jean Metcalfe, Don Moss, Polly Perkins
- 7 September 1963 – Jane Asher, Alan Freeman, Tommy Roe and a "surprise guest"
- 14 September 1963 – Sam Costa, Louise Dunn, Annie Nightingale, Bruce Prochnik
- 21 September 1963 – Dora Bryan, Alan Dell, Adam Faith and a "surprise guest"
- 28 September 1963 – Katie Boyle, Jess Conrad, Pete Murray, Barbara Windsor
- 5 October 1963 – Bunny Lewis, Julia Lockwood, Wolf Mankowitz, Helen Shapiro
- 12 October 1963 – Jim Backus, Tonia Bern, Kenny Lynch and a "surprise guest"
- 19 October 1963 – Terence Edmond, Dusty Springfield, Steve Race and a "surprise guest" (possibly Cliff Richard)
- 26 October 1963 – Brian Epstein, Jimmy Henney, Barbara Young and a "surprise guest"
- 2 November 1963 – Cilla Black, Dick Haymes, Pete Murray and a "surprise guest" Heinz
- 9 November 1963 – Alan Freeman, Fergus McClelland, Annie Ross and a "surprise guest"
- 16 November 1963 – Edmund Purdom, Linda Christian, Alan Dell, Jane Asher (deputising for Dee Dee Sharp, who was unable to appear)
- 23 November 1963 – Cilla Black, Sid James, Don Moss, Anna Quayle
- 30 November 1963 – June Ritchie, Nancy Spain, Jimmy Young and a "surprise guest"
- 7 December 1963 – The Beatles, (surprise guest – Cilla Black)
- 14 December 1963 – Neal Arden, Katie Boyle, Freddie Garrity and a "surprise guest" Gay Emma
- 21 December 1963 – Alma Cogan, Angela Douglas, Rolf Harris, Mitch Murray and a "surprise guest"
- 25 December 1963 "Christmas Night with the Stars Special" – Stanley Baxter portrayed four panellists
- 28 December 1963 – Polly Elwes, Matt Monro, Jimmy Savile and a "surprise guest"

1964

- 4 January 1964 – Peter Sellers, Dora Bryan, David Gell and a "surprise guest" Cilla Black
- 11 January 1964 – Andrea Allan, Eva Bartok, Pete Murray and a "surprise guest" Dave Clark
- 18 January 1964 – Jane Asher, Vic Lewis, Robert Morley and a "surprise guest"
- 25 January 1964 – Adam Faith, Carole Ann Ford, Jean Metcalfe and a "surprise guest" Phil Spector
- 1 February 1964 – Susan Maughan, Jane Morgan, Ian Fenner, Bruce Prochnik
- 8 February 1964 – Alan Freeman, Allan Sherman, Vivienne Taylor and a "surprise guest" Elke Sommer
- 15 February 1964 – Lesley Duncan, Steve Race, Sally Smith and a "surprise guest"
- 22 February 1964 – Sam Costa, Susan Hampshire, James Garner and a "surprise guest" Cilla Black
- 29 February 1964 – Jane Asher, Dora Bryan, Brian Epstein, Gerry Marsden of The Pacemakers
- 7 March 1964 – Terence Edmond, Annette Funicello, Bob Monkhouse, Karen Elliott
- 14 March 1964 – Maureen Cleave, Millicent Martin, Matt Monro, Bobby Vee
- 21 March 1964 – Kathy Kirby, Henry Mancini, Jean Metcalfe, Spike Milligan
- 28 March 1964 – Arthur Askey, Ted King, Beverley Todd and a "surprise guest"
- 4 April 1964 – Julia Foster, Derek Johnson, Eric Sykes, Mary Travers of Peter, Paul and Mary
- 11 April 1964 – Sid James, Sarah Miles, Jimmy Young and a "surprise guest"
- 18 April 1964 – Iain Gregory, Cilla Black, Katie Boyle, Tommy Trinder
- 25 April 1964 – Honor Blackman, Dick Emery, Alan Freeman, Mia Farrow
- 2 May 1964 – Freddie Garrity, Maureen Cleave, Dick Haymes, Barbara Windsor
- 9 May 1964 – Millicent Small (Millie), Carole Carr, Pete Murray, Frankie Vaughan
- 16 May 1964 – Roy Castle, Judith Chalmers, Libby Morris, Billy Walker
- 23 May 1964 – Stratford Johns, Lance Pervical, Jean Metcalfe, Polly Perkins
- 30 May 1964 – Ken Dodd, Pete Murray, Rosemary Nicholls, Marjorie Proops
- 6 June 1964 – Diana Dors, Charlie Drake, Bunny Lewis, Jessie Matthews
- 13 June 1964 – Adam Faith, Zsa Zsa Gabor, Des O'Connor, Juliet Prowse
- 20 June 1964 – Jane Asher, Davy Kaye, Stirling Moss, Anne Heywood
- 27 June 1964 – Dorothy Dandridge, Bill Owen, Jimmy Savile, Janette Scott
- 4 July 1964 – The Rolling Stones
- 11 July 1964 – Lionel Jeffries, Stubby Kaye, Annie Nightingale, Tessie O'Shea
- 18 July 1964 – Brian Epstein, Dora Bryan, Ian Hendry, Nancy Roberts
- 25 July 1964 – George Harrison, Reg Varney, Carole Ann Ford and a "surprise guest"
- 1 August 1964 – Ringo Starr, Katie Boyle, Judy Cornwell, Ray Martine
- 8 August 1964 – Unity Hall, Kenneth More, Chita Rivera, Cardew Robinson
- 15 August 1964 – Max Bacon, Caroline Charles, Maureen Cleave, Laurence Harvey
- 22 August 1964 – Bernard Bresslaw, Derek Johnson, Brenda Lee, Ginette Spanier
- 29 August 1964 – Susan Baker, Millicent Martin, Stanley Unwin, Jimmy Savile
- 5 September 1964 – Antony Booth, Diane Cilento, Laurie Henshaw, Barbara Roscoe
- 12 September 1964 – Dawn Addams, Don Moss, Vivienne Ventura and a "surprise guest"
- 19 September 1964 – Honor Blackman, Arthur Askey, Adam Faith, Lulu
- 26 September 1964 – Roy Castle, Pete Murray, Adrienne Posta and "surprise guest" Sandie Shaw (This jury was reunited in 1983 for the BBC's The Time of Your Life hosted by Noel Edmonds, when Shaw was again a surprise for the three jurors who had just (accurately as it transpired) judged her single Wish I Was as a 'miss'.
- 3 October 1964 – Jane Asher, Alan Freeman, Gene Pitney and a "surprise guest"
- 10 October 1964 – Judith Chalmers, Peter Cook, P. J. Proby, Julie Rogers
- 17 October 1964 – Des O'Connor, Mary Wells, Jimmy Young and a "surprise guest"
- 24 October 1964 – Sid James, Andrew Loog Oldham, The Marchioness of Tavistock and a "surprise guest"
- 31 October 1964 – Marianne Faithfull, Don Wardell, Petula Clark, Stubby Kaye
- 7 November 1964 – Rolf Harris, Portland Mason, Gene Pitney, Maggie Stredder
- 14 November 1964 – Joe Brown, Terence Edmond, Jackie DeShannon and a "surprise guest"
- 21 November 1964 – Liza Minnelli, Alma Cogan, Spike Milligan, Pete Murray
- 28 November 1964 – Lulu, Jean Metcalfe, Eric Morecambe, Ernie Wise
- 5 December 1964 – Diahann Carroll, Vic Lewis, Pete Murray, Sandie Shaw
- 12 December 1964 – Lonnie Donegan, Shirley Eaton, Jimmy Edwards, Polly Elwes
- 19 December 1964 – Marianne Faithful, Sheila Hancock, Tony Hatch, Kenneth Williams
- 26 December 1964 – Alan Freeman, Nyree Dawn Porter, William Rushton, Susannah York

1965

- 9 January 1965 – David Healy, Peggy Mount, Pete Murray, Dusty Springfield
- 16 January 1965 – Katie Boyle, Maureen Cleave, Rupert Davies, Richard Wattis
- 23 January 1965 – Angela Douglas, Virginia Lewis, Wolf Mankowitz, Del Shannon
- 30 January 1965 – Paul Anka, Stubby Kaye, Julie Samuel, Miss World Ann Sidney
- 6 February 1965 – Thora Hird, Linda Lewis, Don Moss, Gene Pitney
- 13 February 1965 – Brian Epstein, Marianne Faithful, Adrienne Posta, Ted Ray
- 20 February 1965 – Chris Hutchins, Lulu, Roy Orbison, Marjorie Proops
- 27 February 1965 – Jane Asher, Bill Crozier, Georgie Fame, Jean Metcalfe
- 6 March 1965 – Tom Jones, Barbara Mullen, Jacqueline Jones, Pete Murray
- 20 March 1965 – Georgia Brown, Paul Jones, Edmund Purdom and a "surprise guest"
- 27 March 1965 – Peter Carver, Roy Castle, Marlene Laird, Joan Turner
- 3 April 1965 – Katie Boyle, Adam Faith, Sue Lloyd, David Tomlinson
- 10 April 1965 – Hermione Gingold, Stubby Kaye, Tom Springfield, Dionne Warwick
- 17 April 1965 – Tony Bennett, Eartha Kitt, Marianne Faithful, Ted Rogers
- 24 April 1965 – Val Doonican, Judy Huxtable, Pete Murray, Julie Rogers
- 1 May 1965 – Dave Clark, Dora Bryan, Sarah Miles, Chris Andrews
- 15 May 1965 – Tsai Chin, Russ Conway, Suzy Kendall, Les Reed
- 22 May 1965 – Mrs. Mills, Pete Murray, Harvey Orkin, Sandie Shaw
- 29 May 1965 – Bill Maynard, Don Moss, Barbara Shelley, Rita Tushingham
- 5 June 1965 – Paul Jones, Alan Freeman, Luciana Paluzzi, Ginette Spanier
- 12 June 1965 – Gay Byrne, Noel Harrison, Lita Roza, Jackie Trent
- 19 June 1965 – Bill Crozier, Susan Hampshire, Stubby Kaye, Una Stubbs
- 26 June 1965 – Sam Costa, Miriam Karlin, Sylvie Vartan, Bobby Vinton
- 3 July 1965 – Astrud Gilberto, Magda Kanopka, Vic Lewis, Wolf Mankowitz
- 10 July 1965 – Amanda Barrie, Chris Curtis, Dionne Warwick, Jimmy Young
- 17 July 1965 – Ray Brooks, Angela Douglas, Stubby Kaye, Millie
- 24 July 1965 – Georgie Fame, Goldie, Sheila Hancock, Pete Murray
- 31 July 1965 – Jackie Collins, Alan Freeman, Jackie Rae, June Thorburn
- 7 August 1965 – Katie Boyle, Billy Daniels, Don Moss, Helen Shapiro
- 14 August 1965 – Ian Carmichael, Mike Hurst, Jacqueline Jones, Sue Thompson
- 21 August 1965 – Carole Carr, Terence Edmond, Herman, Rosemary Nichols
- 28 August 1965 – Jill Browne, Alan Clark, Lee Francis, Pete Murray
- 4 September 1965 – Victor Borge, Helen Cherry, Adam Faith, Sandie Shaw
- 11 September 1965 – Val Doonican, Dudley Moore, Barbara Ferris, Marion Montgomery
- 18 September 1965 – Lucy Bartlett, Sam Costa, Rolf Harris, Nancy Wilson
- 25 September 1965 – Petula Clark, Buddy Greco, Virginia Lewis, Jonathan King
- 2 October 1965 – Tito Burns, Maureen Cleave, Vince Hill and a "surprise guest"
- 9 October 1965 – Louise Cordet, Julie Felix, Lance Percival, Leslie Phillips
- 16 October 1965 – Danny Piercy, Gene Pitney, Marion Ryan, Ginette Spanier
- 23 October 1965 – Lulu, Henry Mancini, Chrissie Shrimpton, Billy Walker
- 30 October 1965 – Herman, Maurice Kinn and two "surprise guests"
- 6 November 1965 – Dave Clark, Lynda Baron, Alexandra Bastedo, Pete Murray
- 13 November 1965 – Bill Kerr, Sandie Shaw, David Wigg, Muriel Young
- 20 November 1965 – Ian Fenner, Suzanna Leigh, Kenny Lynch, Patrice Wymore
- 27 November 1965 – Brian Epstein, Juliette Greco, Françoise Hardy, Hugh Lloyd
- 4 December 1965 – Simon Dee, Carolyn Hester, Statford Johns, Ketty Lester
- 11 December 1965 – Miss World Lesley Langley, Mickie Most, Dakota Staton, Johnny Tillotson
- 18 December 1965 – Cilla Black, Con Cluskey, Peter Haigh, Edina Ronay

1966

- 1 January 1966 – Max Bygraves, 'Uncle' Eric Bygraves, Anthony Bygraves, Maxine Bygraves
- 8 January 1966 – Katie Boyle, Paul Jones, Dee Dee Warwick, Pete Murray
- 15 January 1966 – Colin Blunstone, Tito Burns, Libby Morris, Veronica Strong
- 22 January 1966 – Peter Cook, Bryan Forbes, Dudley Moore, Nanette Newman
- 29 January 1966 – Spencer Davis, Maurice Kinn, Marion Ryan, Sara Leighton
- 5 February 1966 – Alan Freeman, Hayley Mills, Marianne Faithful, Jimmy Greaves
- 12 February 1966 – Pete Murray, Lulu, Eddy Arnold, Barbara Windsor
- 19 February 1966 – Manfred Mann, Eva Bartok, Mike Douglas, Emily Yancy
- 26 February 1966 – Scott Walker, Judy Geeson, Don Moss, Evelyn Taylor
- 5 March 1966 – Eric Burdon, Malou Pantera, Gene Pitney, Briony Newton
- 12 March 1966 – Bert Kaempfert, Patsy Ann Noble, Brian Matthew, Wendy Varnals
- 19 March 1966 – Adam Faith, Shirley Anne Field, Jeannie Carson, Jimmy Young
- 26 March 1966 – Nina & Frederik, Adrienne Posta, Ray Davies of The Kinks
- 2 April 1966 – Millicent Martin, Kenneth Williams, Vicki Carr, Pete Murray
- 9 April 1966 – Sandie Shaw, Dave Clark, Katie Boyle, Stubby Kaye
- 16 April 1966 – Simon Dee, Val Doonican, Rosemary Nicols, Julie Rogers
- 23 April 1966 – Roy Orbison, Jimmy Savile, Barbara Hawkins, Samantha Juste
- 30 April 1966 – Roy Hudd, Judith Chalmers, Ian Fenner and a "surprise guest"
- 7 May 1966 – Spike Milligan, Lulu, Georgie Fame, Gunilla Hutton
- 14 May 1966 – Helen Shapiro, Jimmy Witherspoon, Janice Whiteman, Frank De Vol
- 21 May 1966 – Jonathan King, Pamela Donald, Bill Mann, Maureen Cleave
- 28 May 1966 – Trini Lopez, Lulu, Maurice Kinn and a "surprise guest"
- 4 June 1966 – Petula Clark, Eric Burdon, Billy Walker, Geraldine Sherman
- 11 June 1966 – Pete Murray, Anne Allen, Jay and a "surprise guest"
- 18 June 1966 – Richard Anthony, Ernestine Anderson, Sam Costa, Annie Nightingale
- 25 June 1966 – Gene Pitney, Susan Maughan, Denny Piercy, Betty Marsden
- 9 July 1966 – Geneveve, Alan Freeman, Blossom Dearie, Frederick Woods
- 23 July 1966 – Paul Jones, Brian Matthew, Penny Valentine, Katie Boyle
- 30 July 1966 – Dave Cash, Joy Marshall, Jackie Stewart, Susan Hampshire
- 6 August 1966 – Bernard Cribbins, Rosemary Squires, Kay Medford, Barry Alldis
- 13 August 1966 – Vivianne Ventura, Anthony Booth, Simon Dee, Sheila Southern
- 20 August 1966 – Don Moss, Patsy Ann Noble, Meg Wynn Owen, Fred Emney
- 27 August 1966 – Juliet Harmer, Engelbert Humperdinck, Danny Wells, Sarah Ward
- 10 September 1966 – Jackie Trent, Judith Arthy, Pete Murray, Chris Farlowe
- 17 September 1966 – Marion Montgomery, Fanny Cradock, Michael D'Abo, Chris Denning
- 24 September 1966 – Lulu, Alma Cogan, Reg Varney, Jimmy Henney
- 1 October 1966 – Una Stubbs, Lena Martell, Kenneth Home, Jimmy Young
- 8 October 1966 – Lynn Redgrave, Penny Valentine, Lionel Bart, Ronnie Carroll
- 15 October 1966 – Julie Rogers, David Hughes, Scott Hamilton, Truly Smith
- 22 October 1966 – Sandie Shaw, Gary Stephens, Mike Felix, Marion Ryan
- 29 October 1966 – Rita Tushingham, Moira Lister, Adam Faith, Johnny Devlin
- 5 November 1966 – Brian Poole, Julia Foster, Dave Clark, Francoise Hardy
- 12 November 1966 – Susan Maughan, Ted Rogers, Carole Carr, Bobby Goldsboro
- 19 November 1966 – Herman, Katie Boyle, Ron Goodwin, Mia Lewis
- 26 November 1966 – Cleo Laine, Eric Burdon, Virginia Ironside and a "surprise guest"
- 3 December 1966 – Alan Freeman, Simon Dee, Pete Murray, Jimmy Savile
- 10 December 1966 – Julie Felix, The Bachelors (Declan Cluskey, Con Cluskey, John Stokes)
- 17 December 1966 – Paul Jones, Rose Brennan, Mickie Most and a "surprise guest"
- 24 December 1966 – The Seekers, (Judith Durham, Bruce Woodley, Keith Potger & Anthony Guy)
- 31 December 1966 – Simon Dee, Alan Freeman, Pete Murray, Jimmy Savile

1967

- 7 January 1967 – 18 February 1967 (all 7 editions) – Pete Murray, Alan Freeman, Jimmy Savile, Simon Dee
- 25 February 1967 – Pete Murray, Jimmy Savile, Virginia Wetherill, Penny Valentine
- 4 March 1967 – Simon Dee, Alan Freeman, Ross Hannaman, Geraldine Sherman
- 11 March 1967 – Pete Murray, Miss World Reita Faria, Jimmy Savile, Judy Geeson
- 18 March 1967 – Alan Freeman, Julia Foster, Simon Dee, Maggie Clews
- 25 March 1967 – Jayne Mansfield, Lulu, Pete Murray, Jimmy Savile
- 1 April 1967 – Una Stubbs, Alan Freeman, Virginia Ironside, Simon Dee
- 8 April 1967 – Jimmy Savile, Maggie London, Mike d'Abo, Polly Devlin
- 15 April 1967 – Pete Murray, Nyree Dawn Porter, Ray Davies, Charlotte Bingham
- 22 April 1967 – Paul Jones, Janet Munro, Gerald Harper, Andee Silver
- 29 April 1967 – Hank Marvin, Bruce Welch, Vicki Carr, Anneke Wills
- 6 May 1967 – Val Doonican, Sandie Shaw, Alan Freeman, Isabel Black
- 13 May 1967 – Cliff Richard, Anita Harris, Roy Hudd, Leila Pasha
- 20 May 1967 – Leslie Crowther, Julie Felix, Shirley Anne Field, Kenny Everett
- 27 May 1967 – Dusty Springfield, Keith Barron, Judith Chalmers, Mickie Most
- 3 June 1967 – Bernard Cribbins, Amanda Barrie, Vince Hill, Annie Nightingale
- 10 June 1967 – Gene Pitney, Georgia Brown, Lance Percival, Isabel Black
- 17 June 1967 – Rolf Harris, Jackie Trent, David Symonds, Charlotte Rampling
- 24 June 1967 – Del Shannon, Dawn Addams, Pete Murray, Sheila Steafel
- 1 July 1967 – Janette Scott, Chris Denning, Mel Tormé, Penny Valentine
- 15 July 1967 – Adam Faith, Annette Andre, Ray Fell, Salena Jones
- 22 July 1967 – Alan Freeman, Anita Harris, Billy Walker, Maggie Clews
- 29 July 1967 – Engelbert Humperdinck, Lulu, Ted Ray, Beverley Adams
- 5 August 1967 – Judith Durham, Athol Guy, Mike Quinn (The Seekers), Barbara Windsor
- 12 August 1967 – Libby Morris, John Walker, Bruce Johnston, Ross Hannaman
- 19 August 1967 – Beryl Reid, Vince Hill, Pik-Sen Lim, David Symonds
- 26 August 1967 – Jessie Matthews, Tsai Chin, Cat Stevens, Tony Blackburn
- 2 September 1967 – Beatrice Lillie, Georgie Fame, Viviane Ventura, Keith Skues
- 9 September 1967 – P. J. Proby, Yolande Bavan, Pete Murray, Jennifer Lewis
- 16 September 1967 – Neil McCallum, Marjorie Proops, Dave Cash, Annette Day
- 23 September 1967 – Clement Freud, Kiki Dee, James Fox, Penny Valentine
- 27 September 1967 – Sandie Shaw, Alan Freeman, Joan Bakewell, Mike Newman (replacing Richard Deacon)
- 4 October 1967 – Bob Monkhouse, Julia Foster, Chris Denning and a "surprise guest"
- 11 October 1967 – Jimmy Savile, Ronnie Corbett, Sheila Steafel, Anita Harris
- 18 October 1967 – Tony Hall (replacing Cy Coleman), Ted Ray, Penny Valentine and a "surprise guest"
- 25 October 1967 – Tony Hatch, Jackie Trent, Stuart Henry and a 'halloween surprise guest'
- 1 November 1967 – Mickie Most, Reg Presley and two "surprise guests"
- 8 November 1967 – Show cancelled. Scheduled guests had been: Tony Blackburn, Gene Pitney, Brenda Lee.
- 15 November 1967 – Lulu, Lord Arran, Scott Walker and a "surprise guest"
- 22 November 1967 – Long John Baldry, Jean Metcalfe (replacing Julie Felix), Pete Murray, Felice Taylor
- 29 November 1967 – J. J. Jackson, Les Reed, Aimi MacDonald, Penny Valentine (who replaced Emperor Rosko)
- 6 December 1967 – Twiggy, Justin de Villeneuve, Tony Blackburn, Julie Felix
- 13 December 1967 – Hattie Jacques, Barry Mason, Emperor Rosko and a "surprise guest"
- 20 December 1967 – Pete Murray, Bobby Vee and two other guests
- 27 December 1967 – Pete Murray, Susan Stranks, Lulu and Eric Sykes

=== 1979 series ===
Hosted by Noel Edmonds. Each show featured a jury of four celebrities and one or two surprise guests whose records were judged by the jury.

- 16 June 1979 – Jury: Pete Murray, Bob Geldof, Linda Lewis, Isla St Clair. Surprise guest: Patti Boulaye
- 23 June 1979 – Jury: Flick Colby, Anne Nightingale, Joe Brown, David Wilkie. Surprise guests: Child & Violinski
- 30 June 1979 – Jury: Elaine Paige, Johnny Rotten, Alan Freeman, Joan Collins. Surprise guests: The Monks & Adrian Munsey
- 7 July 1979 – Jury: Dusty Springfield, Tony Blackburn, Jonathan King, Britt Ekland. Surprise guests: Black Lace
- 14 July 1979 – Jury: Jimmy Savile, Lorraine Chase, Amii Stewart, Billy Idol. Surprise guests: Sparks
- 28 July 1979 – Jury: Mike Batt, Patti Boulaye, Bob Geldof, Mike Read. Surprise guests: Dollar & Jimmy Pursey
- 4 August 1979 – Jury: Rick Wakeman, Judie Tzuke, Billy Connolly, Jimmy Pursey. Surprise guests: The Starjets
- 11 August 1979 – Jury: Tina Charles, Kenny Everett, Lesley Judd, Sting. Surprise guests: Chas & Dave
- 18 August 1979 – Jury: Dave Bartram, Keith Chegwin, Dana, Bonnie Tyler. Surprise guests: Pan's People

(The series had a one-week break on 21 July.)

=== 1989 series ===
(filmed in Newcastle upon Tyne, 1989), hosted by Jools Holland

- 24 September 1989 – Julian Clary, Jermaine Jackson, Simon Climie, Paris Gray. (Isaac Hayes was billed to appear, but did not take part)
- 1 October 1989 – Fish, Cat, Adrian Edmondson, Courtney Pine
- 8 October 1989 – Dawn French, Jennifer Saunders, Francis Rossi, Julia Fordham
- 15 October 1989 – Siouxsie Sioux, Tony Hadley, Helen Lederer, Frank Bruno
- 22 October 1989 – Tim Rice, Adeva, Vic Reeves, Norman Cook
- 29 October 1989 – Lulu, Kit Hollerbach, Gary Stretch, Glen Tilbrook
- 5 November 1989 – David Essex, Antoine de Caunes, Ade Edmondson, Rebel MC
- 12 November 1989 – Leee John (replaced by a late Mica Paris half-way through), Matt Goss, Luke Goss, Tom Watkins
- 19 November 1989 – Jerry Sadowicz, Tim Pope, Mark Shaw, Zeke Manyka
- 26 November 1989 – Simon O'Brien, Lloyd Cole, Pam Hogg, Slim Gaillard
- 3 December 1989 – Jermaine Stewart, Carol Decker, Bruno Brookes, Jeremy Hardy

=== 1990 series ===
(filmed in London, 1990) host – Jools Holland

- 23 September 1990 – Maria McKee, Peter Hooton, Michelle Collins, Richard O'Brien
- 30 September 1990 – Alan Freeman, Neneh Cherry, John Fashanu, Vic Reeves and Bob Mortimer
- 7 October 1990 – Anthony Wilson, Rachael Lindsay, Shaun Ryder, Barbara Windsor
- 14 October 1990 – KRS-One, Rowland Rivron, Jakki Brambles, Kevin Kennedy
- 21 October 1990 – Jonathan Ross, Jonathon Morris, Black Francis, Kym Mazelle
- 28 October 1990 – Craig Ferguson, Tracey MacLeod, Robert Smith, Durga McBroom
- 4 November 1990 – Katie Boyle, Margaret Thatcher portrayed by Steve Nallon
- 11 November 1990 – Neil Campbell, Brian Travers, Trevor and Simon (appearing as their Singing Corner characters from Going Live!)
- 18 November 1990 – Bernard Sumner, Pat Cash, Linda Hartley, Bootsy Collins. (Betty Boo was scheduled but did not participate)
- 25 November 1990 – Dusty Springfield, Bob Geldof, Monie Love, Rowland Rivron
