= The Game (band) =

British Band

- Origin: Mitcham, Southwest London
- Genres: Rock and roll; mod; psychedelic
- Years active: 1960s; 1990s
- Labels: Pye; Decca; Parlophone
- Past members: Terry Spencer; Allen Janaway; Tony Bird; Terry Goodsell

The Game was a band from Mitcham, England. They attracted widespread controversy after a seven-minute discussion of their 1967 single, "The Addicted Man", was withdrawn from an episode of Juke Box Jury.

== Career ==
The Game formed in 1963 in Mitcham; lead guitarist Terry Spencer and bassist Allen Janaway had previously played in Surrey-based band the Secrets, and the line-up also contained the then-14-year-old rhythm guitarist Tony Bird. Their first record, "Gotta Keep Movin' Baby", was a rock and roll song co-authored by Kenny Lynch, and was released in 1965 on Pye Records. After it flopped, the band changed to Decca Records, became a Mod band, and released "Gonna Get Me Someone", another flop. They then signed to Parlophone Records, and tried to release an anti-drug single, "The Addicted Man", which had lyrics written by Lesley Blake and music by Alan Gowing and Terry Brown.

In January 1967, the News of the World launched a four-week series on drugs and popular music, in which they criticised the BBC for using Juke Box Jury to play Mothers of Invention's "Can't Happen Here", which they alleged was made under the influence of LSD. As a result, the BBC cut a seven-minute discussion of "The Addicted Man" from the edition broadcast on 7 January, in which the show's jury, Pete Murray, Simon Dee, Alan Freeman and Jimmy Savile, misinterpreted the song as being pro-drugs, and critically vilified it; as a result, the programme started late, and with a cartoon in its place. As a result of the media hostility, Parlophone withdrew the song. Not wanting to suffer a similar fate, a panicked EMI ordered the Smoke's "My Friend Jack" recut. Maurice Kinn, the then-editor of NME, was not amused, using a 14 January 1967 edition to attack the BBC for "funk[ing] the chance" to "dismiss th[e] trend" of drugs "playing an increasingly prominent part in pop lyrics [...] as distasteful rubbish", further adding that, in all caps for emphasis, "If the BBC is going to turn a cold shoulder to all drug-taking implications in pop music, it might as well scrub JBJ immediately". Rob Chapman used his 2015 book, Psychedelia and Other Colours, to note that:

Despite the controversy - the title phrase appears nowhere in the song itself - and the fact that the opening words are 'Take it, boy' and the chorus goes 'Reach there, man / and get there fast', there is little in the song to distinguish it from any of the other Who-influenced R&B that was released during the period. The subject matter might have been abundantly clear to anyone in the know, but had the song just been called 'Reach There, Man', it's quite possible that the Juke Box Jury panellists would have remained oblivious to what the Game were really singing about. The lyrics, delivered in an insolent slur through a wall of feedback and fuzz, would have been as unintelligible to the unconverted as many rap lyrics are now.

— Rob Chapman, Psychedelia and Other Colours

In 2019, demo copies of "The Addicted Man" were selling for £700, and stock copies for £1,000. "The Addicted Man"'s replacement was the psychedelic "It's Shocking What They Call Me", backed with "Help Me Mummy's Gone". Shindig! described "It's Shocking What They Call Me" as "without a doubt one of the most cacophonous, off-key '60s singles ever to appear on a major label". The band then split up, with Bird joining Kind Hearts & English, Spencer forming Lavender Grove with Stan Decker, and both later forming a band called Grail, who released an album produced by Rod Stewart. They reunited in 1995, and would later release an album It's Shocking What They Call Us.
