= She Always Gets Their Man =

1962 British film by Godfrey Grayson

- British quad poster
- Directed by: Godfrey Grayson
- Written by: Mark Grantham (original story)
- Produced by: Edward J. Danziger; Harry Lee Danziger; John Ingram
- Starring: Sally Smith; Terence Alexander; Ann Sears; William Fox; Avril Elgar
- Cinematography: Lionel Banes
- Edited by: John Dunsford
- Music by: Bill Le Sage
- Production company: Danziger Productions
- Release date: 1962
- Running time: 61 minutes
- Country: United Kingdom
- Language: English

She Always Gets Their Man is a 1962 British comedy film directed by Godfrey Grayson and starring Sally Smith and William Fox. It was written by Mark Grantham and produced by The Danzingers.

== Plot ==
The ladies of the Kensington Residential Club For Women have a problem when Betty's country cousin comes to stay. Beautiful blonde Sally is an instant hit with all the men, much to the annoyance of Betty and her friends. In a desperate attempt to distract gold digging Sally from stealing their boyfriends, the women hire an actor to pose as a millionaire to woo her. However, when the actor begins to take his role rather too seriously, Betty and her friends must put an end to the charade.

== Cast ==
- Sally Smith as Sally
- Terence Alexander as Bob Conley
- Ann Sears as Betty Tate
- William Fox as Waling
- Avril Elgar as Sylvia
- Benice Swanson as May
- Gale Sheridan as Phyllis
- Michael Balfour as Runkle
- Ian Curry as Hal
- John Brooking as Sir Basil
- Sandra Alfred as Naomi
- Graham Curnow as Jack
- Paul Craig as Joe
- Annette Kerr as Clara
- Malcolm Knight as George

== Reception ==
The Monthly Film Bulletin wrote: "Flat and static treatment of a feebly scripted anecdote; performances and staging are on the same unlucky level."
