= Trouble with Eve =

1960 British film by Francis Searle

- British lobby card
- Directed by: Francis Searle
- Screenplay by: Brock Williams
- Based on: "Widows are Dangerous", play by June Garland
- Produced by: Tom Blakeley
- Starring: Hy Hazell; Sally Smith; Robert Urquhart; Garry Marsh
- Cinematography: Walter J. Harvey (as James Harvey)
- Edited by: Eric Boyd-Perkins
- Music by: Wilfred Burns
- Production company: A Mancunian Butcher Production
- Distributed by: Butcher's Film Service (UK)
- Release date: March 1960 (UK)
- Running time: 65 min.
- Country: United Kingdom
- Language: English

Trouble with Eve is a 1960 British second feature comedy film directed by Francis Searle and starring Hy Hazell, Sally Smith, Robert Urquhart and Garry Marsh. The screenplay was by Brock Williams based on the 1953 play Widows are Dangerous by June Garland. It was shot at Walton Studios. The film was released in the U.S. in 1964 as In Trouble With Eve.

== Premise ==
In the sleepy English village of Warlock, Louise Kingston converts her cottage into "The Willow Tree", a commercial tearoom. However, scandal ensues when the local inspector gets caught with his pants down, and the tea room is rumoured to be a brothel.

== Cast ==
- Hy Hazell as Louise Kingston
- Robert Urquhart as Bryan Maitland
- Sally Smith as Eve Kingston
- Garry Marsh as Roland Axbridge
- Vera Day as Daisy Freeman
- Grace Denbigh Russell as Mrs Mordant
- Brenda Hogan as Angie Kingston Rigby
- Denis Shaw as George Rigby
- Iris Vandeleur as Mrs Biddle
- Frank Atkinson as cabdriver
- David Graham as car driver
- Tony Quinn as Bellchambers
- Bruce Seton as Colonel Digby-Phillpotts
- Kim Shelley as Mrs Digby-Phillpotts
- Bill Shine as artist

== Critical reception ==
Chibnall and McFarlane in The British 'B' Film wrote that the film: "despite its shop-worn late-of-the-West-End look, moves along breezily and the competent actors make the most of their amusing lines."

In British Sound Films: The Studio Years 1928–1959 David Quinlan rated the film as "poor", writing: "Slaptick farce devoid of inspiration."

TV Guide called the film "a barely average British comedy."
