= Sally Smith (actress) =

British actress (born 1942)

Sally Smith (born 19 April 1942) is a British actress born in Godalming, Surrey. Although primarily a star of both dramatic and musical theatre she appeared in several films and dozens of television shows.

== Career ==
She made her film debut as a child in The Magic Box (1951) with Robert Donat, and another early movie was The Story of Esther Costello (1957) with Joan Crawford. In the 1960s she was the female lead in the films Trouble with Eve (1960), She Always Gets Their Man (1962), and Father Came Too! (1964). She is particularly well remembered internationally for her standout role as Jill in the cult Italian giallo The Young, the Evil and the Savage (1968), directed by Antonio Margheriti.

Throughout the 1950s and 60s she appeared in several television spectaculars including two of her own, as well as variety, drama and comedy programmes including The Avengers (1961), No Hiding Place (1961), six guest appearances on Sunday Night at the London Palladium, Richard Whittington, Esquire (1964) opposite Tommy Steele, and the title role in Cinderella for BBC TV. She played the female lead, Jennifer Corder (daughter of Dr. Roger Corder, portrayed by Herbert Lom), in two series of the acclaimed television drama The Human Jungle (1963–64).

In theatre she starred in several long-running West End musicals including the title role in Marigold opposite Jeremy Brett (Savoy Theatre), Lulu in Give a Dog a Bone (Westminster Theatre), Hilaret in Lock Up Your Daughters (Her Majesty's Theatre), Jill in Humpty Dumpty (London Palladium), Sal in Ten Years Hard opposite David Essex (Mayfair Theatre), Hope Langdon in Something's Afoot (Ambassadors Theatre), Follies (Shaftesbury Theatre), The Chanteuse in Aspects of Love (Prince of Wales Theatre), and Madame Giry in Phantom of the Opera (Her Majesty's Theatre).

She created the role of The Kid in the original UK production of the Anthony Newley / Leslie Bricusse musical The Roar of the Greasepaint - The Smell of the Crowd opposite Norman Wisdom, and later recreated the role opposite Anthony Newley in the original Broadway production at the Shubert Theatre. During her almost two-year run on Broadway she made numerous American TV appearances with such artistes as Johnny Carson and Jerry Lewis.

Among her many other London and provincial theatre credits and national tours are Alice (Royal Shakespeare Company), Lysistrata, Sleeping Beauty, Honor Bright, The Ghost Train, Rumour About Romeo opposite Stuart Damon and Stubby Kaye, Just Before Dawn, Having a Ball, Special Occasions, Side By Side By Sondheim, Twice Around The Park and Follies.

She can be heard on the original cast album recordings of Marigold, The Roar of the Greasepaint - The Smell of the Crowd and Aspects of Love.

From 1969 to 1981 she was married to the singer/songwriter Gordon Haskell who composed and sang the 2001 number 2 hit single 'How Wonderful You Are' .

== Partial filmography ==
- The Magic Box (1951), as Little Girl
- The Story of Esther Costello (1957), as Susan North
- Trouble with Eve (1960), as Eve
- She Always Gets Their Man (1962), as Sally
- Father Came Too! (1964), as Juliet Munro
- The Young, the Evil and the Savage (1968), as Jill

=== Television ===
- ITV Play of the Week - Come Read Me a Riddle (1956), as Sally Hutton
- The Little Beggars (1958), as Polly Peachum
- A Life of Bliss (1961), as Vickie Batten
- No Hiding Place (1961), as Pola
- The Avengers, episode "Toy Trap" (1961), as Bunty Seton
- The Cheaters (1962), as Fay
- ITV Play of the Week - Double Yolk (1963), as Jane
- First Night (1963), as Janet
- Humpty Dumpty (1963), as Mary Mary
- The Human Jungle (1963–1964), series lead as Jennifer Corder
- Richard Whittington, Esquire (TV movie, 1964), as Alice
- Cinderella (TV production, 1967), as Cinderella
- The Bill, episode "Saturday Blues" (1989), as Bride's mother
