= True as a Turtle =

1957 British film by Wendy Toye

- Original British quad poster
- Directed by: Wendy Toye
- Written by: John Coates; Jack Davies; Nicholas Phipps
- Based on: novel by John Coates
- Produced by: Peter De Sarigny
- Starring: John Gregson; Cecil Parker; June Thorburn
- Cinematography: Reginald H. Wyer
- Edited by: Manuel del Campo
- Music by: Robert Farnon
- Production company: Rank Organisation Film Productions
- Distributed by: J. Arthur Rank Film Distributors (UK)
- Release date: February 1957
- Running time: 96 minutes
- Country: United Kingdom
- Language: English

True as a Turtle is a 1957 British comedy film directed by Wendy Toye and starring John Gregson, Cecil Parker, June Thorburn and Keith Michell. The screenplay was by John Coates, Jack Davies and Nicholas Phipps, based on the 1955 novel of the same title by Coates.

== Premise ==
Dudley Patridge, an industrialist, owns a small boat called Turtle, that goes in a trip to France. The crew that sails on it includes Dudley's wife Alicia, Tony and June Hudson, who are on honeymoon, and Harry Bell and Ann. Harry turns out to be an assessor sent to investigate the use of phoney chips at a French casino.

== Cast ==
- John Gregson as Tony Hudson
- Cecil Parker as Dudley Partridge
- June Thorburn as Jane Hudson
- Keith Michell as Harry Bell
- Elvi Hale as Ann
- Avice Landone as Valeria Partridge

== Production ==
John Coate's novel was published in 1955. The Daily Telegraph called it "witty".

Filming took place in July 1956 at Pinewood studios and on location. The England maritime location for shooting was mainly the River Hamble; the yacht club shown is the Royal Lymington Yacht Club.

Director Wendy Toye had been under contract to Alex Korda, and this transferred to the Rank Organisation after Korda's death. She disliked working at Rank. Toye said "Earl St John... was a dear man and very nice but you didn't feel he was the least bit involved artistically... in the film you were doing; and John Davis you felt was absolutely against whatever film you were doing. You didn’t feel there was the slightest bit of interest. That he just hated the whole idea. Didn’t like anybody in it, kept on wanting to change everybody who was in it."

Toye said Peter de Serigny asked for her to work on True as a Turtle, admitting "I really don’t know why I was chosen... I always thought I had a certain flair for doing odd ball stuff, which is what I always wanted to do but I don’t think I had great opinion of myself as a film director. And I think I was just very thrilled to do what whatever I was given."

She recalled de Serigny as "very good to work with" but had a fight with John Davis "over one of the artists" in the film "because he wanted to get rid of her after the first week’s shooting. And I said no. And then James Archibald came on the scene and he was a remarkable man.. I was very lucky that he arrived just at that time."

Toye recalled "we used to go out on a fairly big launch to get on to this small boat at about 6.30 in the morning, all having bacon and egg sandwiches, really the nicest times of one life, they were with the crew."

== Reception ==
Variety called it "mild comedy entertainment... The frail yarn depends mainly an atmosphere and on Parker’s bellicose personality. There’s a minimum of suspense and only a modest amount of incident. Yet, despite these obvious weaknesses, the film generates a degree of acceptable charm."

The Monthly Film Bulletin wrote: "With yachts taking the place of veteran cars, this slight comedy is somewhat reminiscent of Genevieve. However, it sadly lacks the wit and pace of the earlier film, being conventionally scripted and slackly handled. The cast work conscientiously through some well-tried farcical situations but can make little lasting impression."

The Evening Standard called it a "damp little comedy which tries to do for old yachts what Genevieve did for old cars... promising comedy situations sink with all hands."

Filmink called it "an attempt to do another Genevieve, with John Gregson on a yacht instead of a car, and June Thorburn as his wife instead of Dinah Sheridan and... Keith Michell instead of Kenneth More and Elvi Hale instead of Kay Kendall… only it didn’t work (it’s not a very good movie)."
