= Godfrey Grayson =

English film director (1913–1998)

Godfrey Ramsey H. Grayson (1913, Birkenhead, Cheshire, England – 1998, Kingston upon Thames, Surrey, England) was an English film director.

== Life and career ==
Grayson was born in Birkenhead, Cheshire. He worked as a film director in the United Kingdom, primarily during the late 1940s and early 1960s.

== Selected filmography ==
- Doctor Morelle (1949)
- Meet Simon Cherry (1949)
- The Adventures of PC 49 (1949)
- Innocent Meeting (1949)
- What the Butler Saw (1950)
- The Lady Craved Excitement (1950)
- Room to Let (1950)
- To Have and to Hold (1951)
- The Fake (1953)
- Black Ice (1957)
- Woman's Temptation (1959)
- An Honourable Murder (1960)
- Escort for Hire (1960)
- The Spider's Web (1960)
- The Pursuers (1961)
- The Durant Affair (1962)
- She Always Gets Their Man (1962)
- The Lamp in Assassin Mews (1962)
- The Battleaxe (1962)
- Design for Loving (1962)
