= Something's Afoot =

1972 satirical musical

- Music: James McDonald; David Vos; Robert Gerlach; Ed Linderman
- Lyrics: James McDonald; David Vos; Robert Gerlach
- Book: James McDonald; David Vos; Robert Gerlach
- Productions: 1972 Atlanta; 1973 Goodspeed Opera House; 1975 San Francisco; 1976 Broadway; 1977 West End; 1982 Showtime Networks; 2012 Goodspeed Opera House; 2019 Studio Recording

Something's Afoot is a musical that spoofs detective stories, mainly the works of Agatha Christie, and especially her 1939 detective novel And Then There Were None. The book, music, and lyrics were written by James McDonald, David Vos, and Robert Gerlach, with additional music by Ed Linderman. The musical involves a group of people who are invited to the lake estate of Lord Dudley Rancour. When the wealthy lord is found dead, it is a race against the clock to find out who is the murderer.

== Production history ==
Something's Afoot premiered at the Alliance Theater in Atlanta in 1972, and then was produced at the Goodspeed Opera House, East Haddam, Connecticut in 1973, at the American Theatre in Washington, D.C., and by the American Conservatory Theater in San Francisco and Los Angeles in 1975. The first two productions starred Mary Jo Catlett as Miss Tweed, and the latter three starred Lu Leonard in that role. After Los Angeles, Pat Carroll starred in a summer stock tour of the show in 1975. According to an article in The New York Times "...Pat Carroll stars in this show...which had an airing at Goodspeed in 1973, will be on the tryout trail all summer long, making stops at, among others, the Lakewood Theater in Skowhegan, Maine..." Something's Afoot received two Joseph Jefferson awards for its Chicago production.

Something's Afoot opened on Broadway at the Lyceum Theatre on May 27, 1976 and closed on July 18 after 61 performances and 13 previews. Directed and choreographed by Tony Tanner, the cast included Tessie O'Shea (Miss Tweed), Gary Beach (Nigel), and Liz Sheridan (Lady Manley-Prowe). It subsequently ran in 1977 in London at the Ambassadors Theatre for 232 performances starring Sally Smith, and was nominated that year for the Olivier Award as Best Musical of the Year.

After London the show was presented in many countries in several languages and has gone on to receive many productions all over the world.

A 1982 stage performance in London, starring Jean Stapleton as Miss Tweed and Andy Gibb as Geoffrey, was taped live with a theatre audience, for broadcast by Showtime Networks.

== Plot ==
=== Act 1 ===
In the country estate of Lord Dudley Rancour in the English lake district in late Spring, 1935, Dudley's servants—Clive, the overworked widower butler, Lettie, the new maid, and Flint, the "gripper" handyman—prepare for the arrival of guests. The guests—flighty Hope Langdon, proper Doctor Grayburn, black sheep nephew Nigel Rancour, supposedly French grande dame Lady Manley-Prowe, retired military Colonel Gillweather, and artist/detective Miss Tweed—express surprise at the presence of other guests, but look forward to their stay. ("A Marvelous Weekend")

Soon after they arrive, Clive announces that a storm has made the estate inaccessible, the power is in danger, Lord Rancour is dead, and that dinner is served. He is immediately killed when the staircase explodes. Miss Tweed appoints herself as leader of the survivors, and they express surprise that "the butler didn't do it". ("Something's Afoot") Doctor Grayburn discovers that Lord Rancour has been shot, and that the revolver is missing. The men leave to confirm that the bridge is flooding, leaving the women alone. Miss Tweed, Hope, and Lettie comfort Lady Manley-Prowe about her fears ("Carry On") and the women patrol the mansion with ornamental spears. Geoffrey, a college student, arrives in the mansion drenched, and is immediately tied and interrogated by the women. When the men return, they examine him and find a pistol, but they find that it is a starting pistol for his college's rowing team. He suggests that they telephone for help, but they find that the wire on every telephone has been cut with Flint's garden shears. Doctor Grayburn is tricked into answering a ringing telephone emerging from the wall, which gasses and kills him.

Geoffrey and Hope are left in a room together, and they find that they have fallen in love. ("I Don't Know Why I Trust You") Nigel confronts Lady Manley-Prowe about a letter he finds from her begging Lord Rancour for money. She reveals that she is the ex-wife of Lord Rancour, and that they divorced after she had an affair with an army lieutenant named Shirley. Nigel enlists her in his search for Rancour's will, in which he expects to be named the legal heir. While trying to distract Colonel Gillweather from Nigel's search, she discovers that he is the same Shirley, and the two reunite. ("The Man With the Ginger Moustache") She tells him that she had had his child, but that Lord Rancour had taken it from her to make it his heir. Nigel discovers the two of them, and they bicker until Miss Tweed interrupts. Geoffrey discovers a gun on Clive's body. Miss Tweed examines the clues, but she herself is under suspicion by the other guests because she "knows too much indeed." ("Suspicious") The power suddenly goes out. The Colonel yells to flip the light switch, and it electrocutes Lady Manley-Prowe when she tries to turn it on, killing her too.

=== Act 2 ===
Gillweather mourns Lady Manley-Prowe. Flint gets the power back on by means of the generator, and as the rest of the survivors go off to examine it, Nigel searches for the will. When he finds it corked in a bottle, he is dismayed to find that he is not his uncle's heir, before having his head bashed in by a mechanical sconce ("The Legal Heir"). Gillweather discovers Nigel's corpse and the will, which he reads before being shot with a dart. He recognizes the poison and diagnoses that he has five minutes to live, but most of his time is taken up by Miss Tweed confiding in him about Flint's "gripper" tendencies and the discovery of Nigel. He is finally able to reveal Rancour's heir to Miss Tweed—Hope Langdon, whom he realizes is his daughter by Lady Manley-Prowe—before succumbing, dignified, to the poison.

Lettie panics at the mounting pile of bodies in the library and the survivors decide to pack up and leave as soon as climatically possible. While the others are doing so, Hope expresses her joy at finding someone like Geoffrey ("You Fell Out of the Sky") and nearly misses being hit by the falling chandelier. Lettie takes this to mean that Hope was supposed to be next, and Hope, Geoffrey, and Miss Tweed go off to pack. Lettie turns the gas on to make tea, but is distracted by Flint, who offers a means of escape by proposing they take his boat off the island. She eagerly accepts his advances this time. ("Problematical Solution [The Dinghy Song]") After he runs to pack, Lettie finds a letter in her pocket, revealing that Lord Rancour stores large sums of money in a large Ming vase. Upon discovering the vase, she cannot resist, and peeks inside, only to be sucked in and ground to bits, the vase spitting out only her shoe.

When the rest of the survivors, Miss Tweed, Geoffrey, Hope, and Flint, discover Lettie's remains, Flint goes to finish the tea. However, as he was smoking and the gas had never been turned off, there is an explosion, killing Flint. Miss Tweed concludes that since Flint's death had been accidental, he had been the murderer, with a motive of insanity. She shows Lord Rancour's will to Hope, revealing her parentage and fortune. Delighted, Geoffrey and Hope ask Miss Tweed how she solves her cases. Miss Tweed replies that all her knowledge comes from reading mystery novels. ("I Owe it All") However, as she thinks over the facts while painting Geoffrey's portrait, she declares that Flint was not the killer. Before she can tell who the true murderer was, she is strangled with her own scarf by a mechanical ornamental spear.

Geoffrey and Hope turn on each other, each suspecting the other of being the killer. However, the portrait of Lord Rancour opens to reveal a victrola, which contains the confession of Lord Rancour. He himself had planned the murders, all in order to let Hope inherit her fortune. He had killed her parents and himself so that she would never have the burden of a guardian, Clive because he had known of the existence of a child, Doctor Grayburn because he had delivered her, and Miss Tweed because she had been Hope's nanny. Rancour assumed that if the truth were revealed, the three of them would stand in her way. Nigel had been killed because he would have contested the will, Lettie because she was blackmailing Rancour, and Flint simply because he was "a gripper." Rancour explains that each murder was planned according to the victim's habits: Clive punctually announced dinner on the stairs at 7:15, for example, when the bomb was to be set off. Grieved, Hope stops listening. She and Geoffrey drink a toast to the new world that awaits them. ("New Day") However, they begin to feel ill as Rancour explains that Flint's death was meant to come from poisoned wine, which they have evidently just drunk (rather than the accidental gas explosion, which Rancour could not have anticipated). Hope and Geoffrey fall dead, thus ending the play.

== Characters ==
The cast is a set of British stock characters typically found in the works of Agatha Christie. They are as follows (in order of appearance):

- Lettie – "The saucy maid"
- Flint – "The caretaker"
- Clive – "The fussy butler"
- Hope Langdon – "The Ingenue"
- Dr. Grayburn – "The family doctor"
- Nigel Rancour – "The black sheep nephew"
- Lady Grace Manley-Prowe – "The Grande Dame"
- Colonel Gillweather – "The old army man"
- Miss Tweed – "The tweedy, elderly amateur detective"
- Geoffrey – "The juvenile; the uninvited guest"

== Principal casts ==
Character	World Premiere (1972)	Goodspeed (1973)	California (1975)	Broadway (1976)	West End (1977)	Showtime Networks (1982)	Goodspeed (2012)	Studio Recording (2019)
Lettie	Patti Perkins	Patti Perkins	Pamela Myers	Neva Small	Ruth Madoc	Charlotte Moore	Liz Pearce	Julie Atherton
Flint	Jim Brochu	Jim Brochu	Darryl Ferreira	S. Marc Jordan	Peter Rutherford	Wayne Robson	Khris Lewin	Daniel Boys
Clive	Mitchell Edmonds	???	Douglas Broyles	Sel Vitella	Michael Bevis	Brian Petchey	Ron Wisniski	Gordon Griffin
Hope Langdon	Susan Corbett	Barbara Heuman	Barbara Heuman	Barbara Heuman	Sally Smith	Lenore Zann	Julia Osborne	Laura Pitt-Pulford
Dr. Grayburn	Claude Horton	???	Jack Schmidt	Jack Schmidt	Robert Dorning	Don McManus	Peter van Wagner	Graham Bickley
Nigel Rancour	Robert G. Denison	David Chaney	Gary Beach	Gary Beach	Dudley Stevens	Blaine Parker	Benjamin Eakeley	Keith Merrill
Lady Grace Manley-Prowe	Evelyn Page	Lu Leonard	Liz Sheridan	Liz Sheridan	Joyce Grant	Pam Hyatt	Lynne Wintersteller	Sally Ann Triplett
Colonel Gillweather	Gary Gage	Gary Gage	Gary Gage	Gary Gage	Peter Bayliss	Tony van Bridge	Ed Dixon	Stuart Pendred
Miss Tweed	Mary Jo Catlett	Mary Jo Catlett	Lu Leonard	Tessie O'Shea	Sheila Bernette	Jean Stapleton	Audrie J. Neenan	Susie Blake
Geoffrey	Kevin Daly	Kurt Peterson	Willard Beckham	Willard Beckham	Martin Smith	Andy Gibb	Hunter Ryan Hurdlicka	Scott Hunter

== Musical numbers ==
It is suggested in the script that the song's participants are not (as is typical) listed with the song titles, thus not giving away the order in which the characters perish.

Act I

- "A Marvelous Weekend" – Clive, Lettie, Hope, & Company
- "Something's Afoot" – Company
- "Carry On" – Miss Tweed, Lady Grace Manley-Prowde, Lettie and Hope Langdon
- "I Don't Know Why I Trust You (But I Do)" – Hope Langdon and Geoffrey
- "The Man With the Ginger Moustache" – Lady Grace Manley-Prowde
- "Suspicious" – Company

Act II

- "The Legal Heir" – Nigel Rancour
- "You Fell Out of the Sky" – Hope Langdon
- "Dinghy" – Flint and Lettie
- "I Owe It All" – Miss Tweed, Hope Langdon and Geoffrey
- "New Day" – Company

== Bibliography ==
- Something's Afoot: A New Murder Mystery Musical, Published by Samuel French, Inc., 1975 ISBN 0-573-68072-8
