= Happily Ever After (1961 TV series) =

British TV sitcom (1961–1964)

- Genre: Sitcom
- Written by: James Kelley; Peter Miller
- Directed by: Philip Jones
- Starring: Dora Bryan; Pete Murray
- Country of origin: United Kingdom
- Original language: English
- No. of series: 2
- No. of episodes: 12

Production
- Running time: 30 minutes
- Production company: ABC Weekend TV

Original release
- Network: ITV
- Release: 12 February 1961 – 31 May 1964

Happily Ever After is a British television sitcom which first aired on ITV in two series between 1961 and 1964.

Actors who made guest appearances on the show include Joan Benham, Derek Benfield and Reginald Marsh.

== Cast ==
- Dora Bryan as Dora Morgan
- Pete Murray as Peter Morgan
- Bryan Coleman as Harry Watkins
- Audrey Noble as Grace Watkins

== Bibliography ==
- Perry, Christopher (2015), The British Television Pilot Episodes Research Guide 1936–2015
