= The Price of Silence (1960 film) =

British film by Montgomery Tully

- Directed by: Montgomery Tully
- Written by: Maurice J. Wilson
- Based on: the novel One Step From Murder by Laurence Meynell
- Produced by: Maurice J. Wilson
- Starring: Gordon Jackson; June Thorburn
- Cinematography: Geoffrey Faithfull
- Edited by: Douglas Myers
- Music by: Don Banks
- Production company: Eternal Films
- Distributed by: Grand National Pictures (U.K.)
- Release date: 1960
- Running time: 73 minutes
- Country: United Kingdom
- Language: English

The Price of Silence is a 1960 British crime film directed by Montgomery Tully and starring Gordon Jackson, June Thorburn, Mary Clare, Maya Koumani, Sam Kydd and Terence Alexander. It was written by Maurice J. Wilson based on the 1958 novel One Step From Murder by Laurence Meynell.

An ex-convict is blackmailed and suspected of murder.

== Plot ==
Richard Fuller is interviewed by the prison governor just prior to his release. He admits guilt to the charge of embezzlement but it was to help a friend, who did not return the cash as promised. Fuller's heart was in the right place.

Seeing a book on a park bench he decides to change his name by deed poll to Roger Fenton in order to make a clean start. He establishes a new career as an estate agent and has a distinct charm and talent. He is given his own office with his name on the door.

In the course of his work he encounters the young Mrs Shipley who takes an instant shine to him in preference to her elderly husband who is a partner in the firm. Although his love interest lies elsewhere with Audrey Truscott, Mrs Shipley says her influence can gain him a partnership.

Roger meets his journalist friend John Braine in a bar and they exchange tips. However, his past catches up with him when his ex-cellmate Slug eavesdrops on the conversation. Slug later turns up to blackmail him and he starts passing him £2 a week in Slug's little confectionery shop. But Slug changes the deal and demands a one-off payment of £600 instead, promising to disappear if this is paid.

Fenton stays late in the office waiting for Slug (planning to murder him) but getting drunk. He chickens out and leaves and meets Mrs Shipley who tries to sober him up. Meanwhile Slug goes to the rendezvous in the office. Mrs West, an elderly client, arrives with £300 as a deposit on a house and Slug kills her and steals the money. Meanwhile Fenton goes to see Miss Truscott and confesses all. They agree to run off together not realising that this will imply guilt in the murder in the office.

Fenton is now up north in Miss Truscott's Yorkshire cottage. He reads about the murder in the newspaper and goes to the police to explain. However, his main alibi for the time of the murder is not supported by Mrs Shipley who denies seeing him. Ironically, Mr Shipley witnessed the liaison and supports Fenton's alibi and he is free to go.

== Cast ==
- Gordon Jackson as Roger Fenton
- June Thorburn as Audrey Truscott
- Maya Koumani as Maria Shipley
- Terence Alexander as John Braine
- Sam Kydd as Slug
- Mary Clare as Mrs West
- Victor Brooks as Superintendent Wilson
- Joan Heal as Ethel
- Olive Sloane as landlady
- Llewellyn Rees as H.G. Shipley
- Annette Kerr as Miss Collins, the office secretary
- Norman Shelley as Councilor Forbes
- Norman Mitchell as landlord

== Critical reception ==
Kine Weekly said "The tale, competently portrayed and adequately directed, contains comedy and romance, but its asides are never permitted to cloud the main issue or rob the climax of punch. Moreover, its staging is realistic, and the dialogue has edge."

Monthly Film Bulletin said "The situation of this mediocre suspense thriller pursues a rambling, rather unconvincing course towards an inevitable conclusion, while the cast strive hard and more or less in vain to give their characters an authoritative ring."

In British Sound Films: The Studio Years 1928–1959 David Quinlan rated the film as "poor", writing: "Quite unconvincing. Moral: don't let your producer write his own screenplay."

The Radio Times Guide to Films gave the film 2/5 stars, writing: "This low-budget programme filler may not have the fiendish twists and turns you'd expect, but it stars the quietly affecting Gordon Jackson as a lag trying to go straight after leaving prison. One of the more maligned quickie stalwarts, Montgomery Tully directs with little urgency but Geoffrey Faithfull brings a craftsman's eye to the visuals."
