= Design for Loving =

1962 British film by Godfrey Grayson

- British quad poster
- Directed by: Godfrey Grayson
- Written by: Mark Grantham
- Produced by: John Ingram
- Starring: June Thorburn; Pete Murray
- Cinematography: Stephen Dade
- Edited by: John Dunsford
- Music by: Bill Le Sage
- Production company: Danziger Productions
- Distributed by: Columbia Pictures Corporation (UK)
- Release date: March 1962 (UK)
- Running time: 68 minutes
- Country: United Kingdom
- Language: English

Design for Loving (also known as Fashion for Loving) is a 1962 British comedy film directed by Godfrey Grayson and starring June Thorburn, Pete Murray and Soraya Rafat. It was written by Mark Grantham.

A beatnik becomes a top fashion model.

== Plot ==
With an eye on the youth market, fashion executive Barbara Winters hires beatnik Stanford as her chief fashion adviser. However, discovering Stanford is in reality Lord Stanford leads to ensuing comic complications.

== Cast ==
- June Thorburn as Barbara Winters
- Pete Murray as Lord Stanford
- Soraya Rafat as Irene
- James Maxwell as Joe
- June Cunningham as Alice
- Prudence Hyman as Lady Bayliss
- Michael Balfour as Bernie
- Edward Palmer as Graves
- John Bay as Freddie
- Marjie Lawrence as Mrs. Samson
- Katharine Page as chaperone
- Patsy Smart as landlady
- Mark Singleton as Karl
- Charles Lamb as Walter
- Humphrey Lestocq as manager
- Mary Malcolm as compere
- Angela Douglas as Bernie's secretary

== Critical reception ==
The Monthly Film Bulletin called the film: "one of those shop-soiled little romantic comedies stuck in the bargain-basement where the situations, backdrops and staging are concerned. The jokes at the expense of beatniks and haute couture tend to become tedious, for all that they are put over with energy by a willing cast."

Kine Weekly wrote: "The picture has a willing cast, but the players are handicapped by sloppy direction, an inept script and bargain basement staging. June Thorburn has cherm as Barbara, an Pete Murray makes the most of his chances as the ill-kempt Lord, put neither they nor the supporting team achieve the impossible and get laughs out of the Cinderella in reverse theme. But to be fair, the film has brevity, if not wit."

TV Guide concluded that the film "...fails to produce much excitement, comic or otherwise."
