= William Fox (actor) =

British actor and writer (1911–2008)

- Born: William Hubert Fox; 26 January 1911; Manila, Philippines
- Died: 20 September 2008 (aged 97); London, England, UK
- Education: Royal Central School of Speech and Drama
- Occupation: Actor
- Years active: 1930–1988
- Spouse(s): Carol Rees (1932–1937/8) (1 daughter) Patricia Hilliard (m. 1938; died 2001) (2 children)
- Children: Alexandra (b. 1940); Nicholas (b. 1942); Amanda Fox
- Military career
- Allegiance: United Kingdom
- Branch: British Army
- Service years: 1939-1945
- Rank: Major
- Unit: London Irish Rifles
- Conflicts: World War II; Battle of France

William Hubert Fox TD (26 January 1911 – 20 September 2008) was a British character actor and writer. He enjoyed early success on the stage playing juvenile roles. After a six-year interruption for military service in the Second World War, his acting career did not reach the heights of his early years.

== Early life ==
Fox was born in Manila in the Philippines, the son of a successful trader who operated across the South China Sea. His parents travelled extensively, and whilst still an infant, he had visited Madrid, Paris and London. In 1916, Fox was sent to preparatory school, then attended Haileybury public school. He was expected to go on to Oxford University and thence into the petroleum industry; this was not to be. Fox read an advertisement in The Times inviting people to audition for the Central School of Speech and Drama, which had been founded by Elsie Fogerty and was at that time based at the Royal Albert Hall, London. He won a scholarship, but since he was from a wealthy family, the scholarship was only given on the condition that the money be passed on to the next person on the list. Fox's father agreed to fund Fox's studies only on the basis that Fox would complete what was normally a two-year course in a single year. He achieved this and was awarded the school's gold medal upon graduating.

== Pre-war career ==
In 1930 Fox left drama school and won a role in London's West End performing in an eight-month run of W. Somerset Maugham's new play The Breadwinner at the Vaudeville Theatre. Following this success, Fox co-founded an acting troupe, based in the West Country, where they converted a former swimming baths in Teignmouth into a theatre. He staged the thriller Rope and, following a glowing review from actor Cyril Maude, the play had an eight-week sold-out run. In 1932, he married Carol Rees, who was seven years his senior and already pregnant with their daughter. The relationship did not survive the divergence of their careers. Rees petitioned for divorce in 1937.

Fox went on to perform in J.B. Priestley's play Dangerous Corner, directed by Tyrone Guthrie; he was billed as "a great discovery". He rejected an offer to join the Broadway cast of the play, opting to join a company led by John Gielgud at the Old Vic Theatre. He played opposite Peggy Ashcroft in As You Like It, and their performance was painted by Walter Sickert. 1934 was Fox's busiest year to date; he performed in five stage plays in the West End. One was Precipice, a play about a ballet, which co-starred dancer Anton Dolin. After a short spell on Broadway, Fox returned to Britain. In the US, he had been offered an audition by Warner Bros., but turned it down since his new love, Patricia Hillard, was acting in Oxford. After being spotted dining together at the Savoy Grill by Priestley, who said he had never seen a couple "so much in love", they had a successful run in Priestley's play I Have Been Here Before which ran from 1937 until 1938.

Fox also acted in and wrote radio dramas. He often wrote under a pseudonym, for he did not wish his fellow actors to know he was the writer and sometimes made casting decisions. His first performance was in 1934 in Ibsen's The Lady from the Sea.

In 1939, Fox and Hillard were living in Dolphin Square, where they became annoyed by their neighbour Unity Mitford's habit of playing loud Nazi marching songs. Inspired by this, and fortified by "lunch at L'Ecu de France", Fox joined the Territorial Army. While he was receiving military training, he also happened to be playing a Nazi officer in a play called Weep for the Spring, about life in Nazi Germany under Adolf Hitler. As a territorial soldier, Fox was amongst the first to be called up in 1939 upon the declaration of war with Germany.

== Military service ==
Fox was an officer in the London Irish Rifles. He was initially trained to join a ski battalion which was to be sent to Finland to aid that country in the Winter War against the Soviet Union. However, an armistice was concluded before he reached the area; he then fought in the Battle of France, and was amongst those evacuated from Dunkirk. Following Staff College, Camberley, he spent the majority of the war stationed in North Africa and the Middle East. One of his roles involved helping to administer the meeting between Churchill, Roosevelt and Stalin in Tehran in 1943. After six years' service, Fox was demobbed with the rank of major (and had had a spell as an acting lieutenant-colonel). He later learned that in 1945, a few days before the liberation of Manila, his parents had been shot by the Japanese. After the war he continued to hold a reserve commission as a captain and honorary major until 1961, when he reached the age limit for service. He was awarded the Territorial Efficiency Decoration (TD) in 1967.

== Post-war career ==
After demobilisation, Fox was considered too old to take on juvenile roles, and given that he had no experience as a lead actor, directors were wary of casting him in these parts. It was whilst in Baghdad that he decided to start the Reunion Theatre; this association was designed to help demobilised actors who had been out of the business for several years. The association did this by performing extracts from well-known plays and inviting agents and producers to watch. One actor who benefited from this was Dirk Bogarde. After several successful productions, Fox handed over the chairmanship of the Reunion Theatre to Laurence Olivier.

During the 1950s and 1960s, Fox's career was mixed; he did a season at Stratford and took on several West End comedies. The 1960s saw him in fewer theatrical roles; he did, however, perform in film, television and radio, for which he also wrote. One acting example being in The Avengers (1967), in the episode "The Winged Avenger". His film credits included roles in The Lavender Hill Mob (1951), The Secret Partner (1961), The Queen's Guards (1961), She Always Gets Their Man (1962), Ransom (1974), Omen III: The Final Conflict (1981) and Mata Hari (1985).

Fox started a wine merchant business and also dealt in antiques and pictures. These activities led to his devoting less time to acting—though he continued to perform, notably in television shows such as The Duchess of Duke Street, When the Boat Comes In and Yes, Prime Minister. The late 1970s saw him return to theatre and the West End in a revival of T. S. Eliot's The Family Reunion. He would also appear in an opera as Haushofmeister in Richard Strauss's Ariadne auf Naxos at Glyndebourne.

== Personal life ==
Fox was married twice; first when aged 21, to the actress Carol Rees, with whom he had a daughter. His second wife was actress Patricia Hilliard, whom he first met in 1938 when they were in a play together. They had a son and a daughter together.

Fox was a member of the Garrick Club, and often spent time there in the company of Kenneth More and Kingsley Amis.
