= Escort for Hire =

1960 British film by Godfrey Grayson

- Directed by: Godfrey Grayson
- Written by: Mark Grantham
- Produced by: Edward J. Danziger; Harry Lee Danziger
- Starring: June Thorburn; Pete Murray; Noel Trevarthen
- Cinematography: James Wilson (as Jimmy Wilson)
- Edited by: Desmond Saunders
- Music by: Tony Crombie (uncredited)
- Production company: Danziger Productions
- Distributed by: Metro-Goldwyn-Mayer (UK)
- Release date: December 1960
- Running time: 66 minutes
- Country: United Kingdom
- Language: English

Escort for Hire is a low budget 'B' 1960 British thriller film directed by Godfrey Grayson and starring June Thorburn, Pete Murray, Noel Trevarthen, Jan Holden and Peter Butterworth. It was written by Mark Grantham and produced by the Danzigers.

== Plot ==
Unemployed actor Steve gets a job with Miss Kennedy's agency as an escort-bodyguard, but ends up being framed for murder after a wealthy client, Miss Elizabeth Quinn, is killed.

== Cast ==
- June Thorburn as Terry
- Pete Murray as Buzz
- Noel Trevarthen as Steve
- Jan Holden as Elizabeth
- Peter Butterworth as Inspector Bruce
- Guy Middleton as Arthur Vickers
- Mary Laura Wood as Barbara
- Derek Blomfield as Jack
- Jill Melford as Nadia
- Patricia Plunkett as Eldon Baker
- Catherine Ellison as receptionist
- Bruce Beeby as Detective Sergeant Moore
- C. Denier Warren as porter
- Viola Keats as Marion
- Totti Truman Taylor as temperance lady

== Critical reception ==
The Monthly Film Bulletin wrote: "The film, dating some way back in the Danziger assembly line, is hardly more than a grab-bag of assorted clichés – from the gag about the short-sighted socialite (played with predatory relish by Jill Melford) to the "surprise" identity of the killer. But it's generally briskly handled and has a Technicolor veneer which, while it may not bear close inspection, still manages to suggest expertise behind the scenes. Pete Murray's crudely comic performance as Buzz is mercilessly irritating, but the rest of the cast go through the motions likeably enough."

Chibnall and McFarlane in The British 'B' Film described the film as: "mildly entertaining, but the plot is full of coincidences and perfunctory causality."

TV Guide wrote, "This routine British crime melodrama is slightly enhanced by Technicolor."
