= June Thorburn =

English actress (1931–1967)

- Born: Patricia June Thorburn; 8 June 1931; Karachi, British India
- Died: 4 November 1967 (aged 36); Blackdown Hill, Sussex, England
- Occupation: Actress
- Years active: 1952–1967
- Spouses: Aldon Bryce-Harvey (m. 1952; div. 1955) Morten Smith Petersen (m. 1959)
- Children: 2

Patricia June Thorburn-Smith (8 June 1931 – 4 November 1967) was a popular English actress whose career was cut short by her death in an air crash.

== Early life ==
Thorburn was born in Karachi, then part of British India. She was the eldest of three children, including her sister Diana and her brother Keith. She spent most of her schooldays in boarding schools in India, since her father was a colonel in the Indian Army and therefore her parents travelled a lot. When he retired from the military, they moved back to Britain.

The 1956 edition of 'Picture Show Who's Who on The Screen', (page 147), made the claim that she was a child "Skiing champion".

June began writing plays from about the age of seven. Her grandfather (Sydney Thubron) who had also spent many years in India as a design engineer, building many important bridges, made early 'movies' and she was the star in several, the first being "Her Second Birthday", when she was only two years old.

== Family ==
June Thorburn had one brother and one sister, the brother being Keith Thorburn, born 1946 and the sister being Diana Thorburn, both still alive today.

When she was 20 she left home and moved to London to pursue her career, where she met and married her first husband, Aldon Richard Bryse-Harvey. During their short and stressful marriage, she bore one daughter in 1953, named Heather-Louise June. The marriage ended in divorce and June moved back to Hampshire, close to her family, for a couple of years until her career started to take off.

In 1957, she moved back to London, where shortly thereafter she met Morten Smith-Petersen, who subsequently became her second husband. She was married to him until her death in 1967. Together with Morten, she had a second daughter named Inger-Sheleen Christabel.

== Career ==
She appeared in her first commercial film in 1952, and quickly worked her way up from supporting roles to second female leads. One of her most notable roles in the mid-1950s was in the comedy-drama Touch and Go (1955), starring Jack Hawkins. Thorburn began to win leading roles, in British comedies such as True as a Turtle (1957) and costume dramas such as Fury at Smugglers' Bay (1961) and The Scarlet Blade (1963). Her most notable film appearance was as the Forest Queen in Tom Thumb (1958). During the early 1960s, she also appeared regularly on British television.

In 1960 she appeared in the television series Danger Man in the episode entitled "The Prisoner" as Sue Carpenter.

== Death ==
She was pregnant with her third child when, returning to London from Spain on Iberia Flight 062, the plane crashed at Blackdown, Sussex, killing all 37 people on board.

== Filmography ==
=== Film ===
Year	Title	Role	Notes
1952	The Pickwick Papers	Arabella Allen	
1953	The Cruel Sea	Doris Ferraby	
1954	Fast and Loose	Barbara Wickham	
1954	Delayed Action	Anne Curlew	
1954	Orders Are Orders	Veronica Bellamy	
1955	Children Galore	Milly Ark	
1955	The Hornet's Nest	Pat	
1955	Touch and Go	Peggy Fletcher	
1957	True as a Turtle	Jane Hudson	
1958	Rooney	Doreen O'Flynn	
1958	Tom Thumb	Forest Queen	
1958	Cinderella	Cinderella	
1959	Broth of a Boy	Silin Lehane	
1960	The Price of Silence	Audrey Truscott	
1960	The 3 Worlds of Gulliver	Elizabeth	
1960	Transatlantic	Judy	
1960	Escort for Hire	Terry	
1961	Fury at Smugglers' Bay	Jenny Trevenyan	
1961	Don't Bother to Knock	Stella	
1962	The Spanish Sword	Eleanor	
1962	Design for Loving	Barbara Winters	
1963	The Scarlet Blade	Claire Judd	
1963	Master Spy	Leila	

=== Television ===
Year	Title	Role	Notes
1951	The Children of Camp Fortuna	Coralie	TV film
1953	Douglas Fairbanks Presents	Mitzi, Kathleen	2 episodes
1954	Sunday Night Theatre	Nellie Sellenger	Episode: "Mrs. Dot"
1957	Shadow Squad	Janet Falconbridge	Episodes: "Boomerang: Parts 1 & 2"
1957	Armchair Theatre	Felicity	Episode: "Now Let Him Go"
1957	ITV Play of the Week	Doris Mead, Gertie Maude, Jane Folland	3 episodes
1958	Shut Out the Night	Ann Middleton	TV film
1958	Cinderella	Cinderella	TV film
1958–1959	ITV Television Playhouse	Lucy/Maggie Massey	2 episodes
1959	Meeting at Night	Connie Triple	TV film
1959–1960	Tales of the Vikings	Jessica, Viola, Jessica	3 episodes
1959–1960	The Four Just Men	Hilary Colson/Vicky	5 episodes
1960	International Detective	Monica	Episode: "The Oakland Case"
1960	Danger Man	Sue Carpenter	Episode: "The Prisoner"
1961	The Cheaters	Ivy	Episode: "The Man with the Ticking Head"
1961	BBC Sunday-Night Play	Lady Sybil Tenterden	Episode: "What Every Woman Knows"
1961	Anna Karenina	Kitty	TV film
1961	The Pursuers	Gwen Adams	Episode: "The Amateur"
1962	Wuthering Heights	Isabella Linton	TV film
1962	No Hiding Place	Barbara Reden	Episode: "Little Girl Stolen"
1963	Richard the Lionheart	Diane	Episode: "The Caveman"
1965	Riviera Police	Sheila Ward	Episode: "A Shot in the Dark... And Two in the Midday Sun/The Target"
1966	Blackmail	Ann Barker	Episode: "The Cream Off the Top"
