= Annette Kerr =

Scottish actress (1920–2013)

- Kerr in Doppelgänger (1969)
- Born: Catherine Annette Kerr Peacock; 2 July 1920; Elderslie, Renfrewshire, Scotland
- Died: 23 September 2013 (aged 93); Denville Hall, London, England
- Resting place: Breakspear Crematorium, Ruislip, London
- Education: Central School of Speech and Drama
- Occupation: Actress
- Years active: 1956–1999

Catherine Annette Kerr Peacock (2 July 1920 – 23 September 2013), known professionally as Annette Kerr, was a Scottish born actress of film, television and stage.

== Life and career ==
During her childhood, Kerr moved with her family from her birthplace in Scotland to Watford, Hertfordshire, where her father worked as a physiotherapist. She made her theatrical debut at the Watford Palace Theatre, and later trained at the Central School of Speech and Drama in London.

Frequent reference to Kerr is made in The Kenneth Williams Diaries (edited by Russell Davies). Kerr and Williams were close friends, and worked together in several stage productions. following their first meeting in 1949. At one point, Williams proposed to her.

Kerr's television appearances included roles in series such as the pilot episode - "Identified" - of Anderson's live-action series UFO (1970), London's Burning (1992) and One Foot in the Grave. She had a recurring role in 2point4 Children (1991-1999, as Dora Grimes).

=== Death ===
Kerr died at the actors' retirement home Denville Hall, where she had been resident, in London on 23 September 2013, aged 93.

== Filmography ==
Year	Title	Role	Notes
1960	The Price of Silence	Miss Collins	
1961	The Third Alibi	Cinema cashier	
1961	So Evil, So Young	Workroom Wardress	
1964	Murder Most Foul	Dorothy	
1968	Prudence and the Pill	Gerald's Secretary	
1969	Doppelgänger	Nurse	Uncredited
1970	The Private Life of Sherlock Holmes	Secretary	Uncredited
