= Pete Murray (DJ) =

British radio and television presenter (born 1925)

Pete Murray OBE
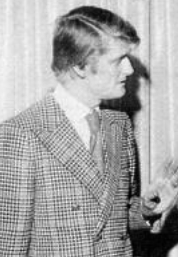
- Murray in 1972
- Born: Peter Murray James; 19 September 1925 (age 101); Hackney, London, England
- Occupations: Radio and television presenter, stage and screen actor
- Years active: 1943–2003, 2008, 2021–present

Peter Murray James (born 19 September 1925), known professionally as Pete Murray, is a British radio and television presenter and actor. He is known for his career with the BBC, including stints on the Light Programme, Radio 1, Radio 2 and Radio 4. In the 1950s, Murray became one of Britain's first pop music television presenters, hosting the rock and roll programme Six-Five Special (1957–1958) and appearing as a regular panellist on Juke Box Jury (1959–1967) and a regular host on Top of the Pops (1964–1969).

Murray was a recurring presence in the BBC's coverage of the Eurovision Song Contest. Murray retired in 2003, before he returned to broadcasting for a Boom Radio special on Boxing Day 2021, over 70 years after his career began. He returned to the station on Boxing Day 2022, presenting a two-hour show alongside his friend David Hamilton. Murray has influenced many other radio personalities. Presenter David Hamilton has credited him as an influence and disc jockey Kenny Everett was also influenced by Murray's "ad-libbing style and warmth".

== Early life ==
Murray was born in Hackney, London on 19 September 1925. He grew up in Chiswick. Murray's mother once sang in the chorus line for Jack Buchanan, and left the music scene to have a family; Murray's father was a World War I veteran who was badly injured in a gas attack in the Battle of the Somme. Murray attended St Paul's School, an experience he did not like. Although a very shy child, he jokingly described himself as a youth as a "bit of a thug" during football matches. Murray decided that the best way to overcome his shyness was through acting, and so when he was fifteen, he auditioned for the Royal Academy of Dramatic Art, and despite having no acting experience, was accepted.

"I was a shy teenager who enjoyed cinema, theatre and anything to do with show business. I set my heart on becoming an actor and it was Colin Chandler at RADA who changed my life when he said that although I was 'dreadful in couple of plays', he believed I had 'something'". (Murray, 2016)

The school's director, Kenneth Barnes, tried kicking him out; however, Murray argued his way back into the school. While at RADA, Murray toured with local repertory theatres, and won a bronze medal for his work. After graduating with a diploma in 1944, he entered the Air force for the last year of the Second World War.

== Career ==
=== Radio ===
In late 1949, Murray's agent approached him with an offer, spending three months in the rebooted English service of Radio Luxembourg, who needed an English speaking disc jockey, for £15 a week. He went to an office in London connected to the station, and was hired on the spot and immediately given a box of half a dozen records. Murray said in a 2015 interview with David Hamilton that the only reason he got the job was because no one else wanted it.

Murray officially joined Radio Luxembourg in September 1950; he was one of its resident announcers in the Grand Duchy, and instead of the expected three months, Murray remained there until 1955. During his time for Radio Luxembourg, he stayed in a hotel in the Grand-Duchy of Luxembourg. One day, Murray was given a box of records from America by a native, who told Murray he had "the hottest thing since show business started"; it was a box of rock and roll records. Murray played one of the records, "Rock Around the Clock" by Bill Haley & His Comets, four times within fifteen minutes, and credits himself as the "first person that ever played Bill Haley" for a European audience.

Murray claims that his "natural charisma" meant that advertisements were always being played on air when he was on (disc jockeys were paid per ad) and states that at one point he was earning more than the chairman of Radio Luxembourg. Murray once swore live on the air, muttering the word "fuck" to himself, as revealed by him on Radio 4's Quiz Wireless Wise. Murray left the radio station and returned to London in 1955, feeling that his stay at the station had long passed its due time, and he wanted to return to the UK again.

Back in London, and now calling himself "Pete" rather than "Peter", he continued to be heard frequently on Radio Luxembourg for many years, introducing recorded sponsored programmes. He also presented popular music on the BBC Light Programme, particularly on the programme Pete Murray's Party from 1958 to 1961. Murray joined pirate radio in 1965 and hosted a show, Call in at Curry's, which was broadcast on Radio Caroline. In September 1968, he stood in for Alan Freeman on Pick of the Pops, while Freeman was in New York. Murray linked up with him for a look at the American pop scene during the two shows that he did.

Murray was one of the original BBC Radio 1 disc-jockeys when the station started in 1967. While at BBC Radio 1, Murray hosted his own television show, Pete's Party, that aired in 1967; its description in an issue of Radio Times was: "with Pete Murray (and a few friends) and records all the way Some old. some new". The programme was produced by Teddy Warrick and aired at 10:31am.

By 1969, he was one of the mainstays of BBC Radio 2, where for over ten years he anchored the two-hour magazine show Open House five days a week, heard by 5.5 million listeners. One April Fools' Day he pretended that the show was being televised. In 1973 and 1976, he was voted BBC Radio Personality of the Year. In 1980, Radio 2 moved Murray from weekday to weekend programming. In 1981, he began a move into more serious, speech-only radio with a stint as presenter of Midweek on BBC Radio 4. At the end of 1983, the BBC cancelled his radio shows, describing his style of broadcasting as too old-fashioned, which led to Murray leaving the BBC altogether, a decision he later admitted to regretting, calling it a "very big mistake".

In 1984, he started afresh as a presenter for LBC, a local talk radio station in London. He later won the Variety Club of Great Britain award for his show. Murray introduced his last programme there on 22 December 2002. In August 2008, he returned as a presenter on an Internet-only station, UK Light Radio. Murray returned to radio to host a special show for Boom Radio on Boxing Day 2021. In 2022, he appeared in the Channel 5 documentary TOTP: Secrets & Scandals. He returned to Boom Radio on Boxing Day 2022 for another show, this time alongside Hamilton. On 2 June 2025, Murray helped Boom Light turn on its DAB+ transmitters at 10:00 a.m. that morning. Murray announced that he would host a slot on Boom Radio on his 100th birthday from 11:00 a.m., playing the biggest songs from his birthday week from the year 1963.

=== Television ===
Murray started his career on television in the late 1950s; he co-hosted one of BBC Television's earliest pop music programmes, the skiffle-based Six-Five Special (1957–1958); other regular presenters were Jo Douglas and Freddie Mills. He was a regular panellist on the same channel's Juke Box Jury (1959–1967), and was a panellist on the show's first and last episodes. Murray hosted the UK heat of the Eurovision Song Contest in 1959, and provided the British commentary for the contest itself on both radio and television from 1959 until 1961; 1968; 1972 to 1973 for radio; and television commentary for the 1975 and 1977 contest. He was an occasional compère of variety shows at the London Palladium.

During the early 1960s, Murray co-hosted the New Musical Express Poll Winners' Concert, annually held at Empire Pool, Wembley, with acts such as the Beatles, Cliff Richard and the Shadows, Joe Brown and the Bruvvers, the Who and many others. These were shown on television. Murray was the "guest DJ" on several editions of ABC-TV's Thank Your Lucky Stars (1961–1966) and he later hosted Come Dancing.

After being offered a spot by Johnnie Stewart, Murray was among the first regular presenters of Top of the Pops when it began in January 1964. Murray originally turned down the role due to him wanting to focus more on his acting career; however, Stewart convinced him to join the show. He was one of the original four presenters on the show (himself, Jimmy Savile, David Jacobs and Alan Freeman) who for the first few years hosted episodes in a rotating line-up. Murray hosted the 16 June 1966 broadcast of Top of the Pops, which was the only time in which The Beatles actually appeared in the Top of the Pops studio to perform. The footage was thought to be lost when the tapes were wiped; however, in 2019 almost the entire performance was discovered when a fan, David Chandler, who had filmed the episode on his silent film camera, revealed his copy.

During the taping of one Top of the Pops episode on 24 August 1967, when the show still required artists to either mime or sing live to a pre-recorded backing track, Murray introduced Jimi Hendrix on, who was supposed to mime to his record "Burning of the Midnight Lamp" but instead the song "The House That Jack Built" by Alan Price began to play. Murray has been the sole surviving member of the original four Top of the Pops hosts since the death of David Jacobs in 2013.

Murray also appeared in pantomime, and guested on many radio and TV panel games. In 1984 and 1985, he was a team captain on the ITV panel game Vintage Quiz. In 2015, he appeared as a guest on a chat show on Big Centre TV hosted by his friend and former radio colleague David Hamilton.

=== Acting ===
After graduating from RADA, Murray found work as a background extra in a few films, including The Life and Death of Colonel Blimp and The Young Mr Pitt, as well as Caravan (1946), Hungry Hill (1947), My Brother Jonathan (1948), Portrait from Life (1948) and No Highway in the Sky (1951). On the London stage, he co-starred with David Hughes and Edward Woodward in the musical Scapa! (1962). During the 1960s, he starred in the British sitcoms Happily Ever After (1961–64), opposite Dora Bryan, and Mum's Boys (1968), with Bernard Bresslaw and Irene Handl.

Murray also appeared on Escort for Hire (1960), A Taste of Money (1960), Design for Loving (1962), The Cool Mikado (1962), and later Simon, Simon (1970) and Cool It Carol! (1970). On television, Murray played Philippe in "My Friend the Inspector", a 1961 episode of BBC TV's Maigret. He appeared as himself in several productions, including the 1962 British musical comedy It's Trad, Dad! alongside fellow BBC disc jockeys Alan Freeman and David Jacobs, and in "The Writer", an episode of ATV's Hancock (1963).

=== Music ===
Murray duetted with Vera Lynn on a 1958 Decca EP of songs from My Fair Lady, performing "The Rain in Spain". In 1960, he released a comedy single "What's It All About?" with disc jockey Brian Matthew. In 1974, Murray was featured on the Emerson, Lake and Palmer live album Welcome Back My Friends to the Show That Never Ends – Ladies and Gentlemen as the master of ceremonies, at the beginning of the album. His introduction to the live show ("Ladies and gentlemen"), mixed with the opening line of the bands' song "Karn Evil 9: First Impression, Part 2" ("Welcome Back My Friends to the Show That Never Ends"), made up the title for the album.

== Personal life ==
Murray was in a relationship with presenter Valerie Singleton from 1967 to 1971 and was engaged to her. He then married Patricia Crabbe, a former barrister. Crabbe died of breast cancer in 2010. He lives in Wimbledon. Murray had one son, Michael Murray James. Michael, who was born to a woman from a previous relationship, was a student at Wycliffe College and like Pete, trained at RADA and worked as an actor. Michael committed suicide at the age of 27 in 1981. When talking about his son's death on live television, Murray became overwhelmed with emotion and afterwards gave talks on coping with family tragedy. In 2016, Murray stated that the loss of Michael is "something I've never got over and it was a terrible experience". Carry On star Kenneth Williams once wrote to Pete to tell him that Michael was "a natural comedian".

In 1983, Murray appeared as a guest newspaper reviewer on the BBC TV's early-morning magazine show Breakfast Time. He advised viewers how to vote at the upcoming election, saying that "a vote for Labour is a vote for communism. May God have mercy on your soul if you don't vote Conservative".

Murray has been a member of the Grand Order of Water Rats since 1969. In 1975, he released his autobiography, One Day I'll Forget My Trousers. He is a supporter of Arsenal F.C. Murray enjoys playing many sports, including golf. In February 2016, Murray fractured his hip after falling over a telephone wire.

Murray turned 100 on 19 September 2025. Ahead of Murray's 100th birthday, a show hosted by the Grand Order of Water Rats honouring his life took place in London on 17 September, during which the Water Rats awarded him a Lifetime Achievement Award, presented to him by Mike Read. The event was covered by BBC News, who mistakenly reported his 100th birthday as happening on the day of the event rather than on the following Friday.

== Filmography ==
=== Film ===
Year	Title	Role	Notes
1943	The Life and Death of Colonel Blimp	Background extra	Uncredited
1944	The Hundred Pound Pillow	Office assistant	Uncredited
1944	Time Flies	Chick	Uncredited
1946	Caravan	Juan	
1946	Jane Eyre	The Reverend Wood	Television movie
1947	Hungry Hill	Lieutenant Fox	
1947	Laburnum Grove	Harold Russ	Television movie
1947	Captain Boycott	Young officer	Uncredited
1948	My Brother Jonathan	Tony Dakers	
1948	Mas' Bit o' Brass	Photographer	Television movie
1949	Portrait from Life	Lieutenant Keith	
1949	A Pair of Spectacles	Dick Goldfinch	Television movie
1950	The Poltergeist	Bobby Ashley	Television movie
1951	No Highway in the Sky	Radio operator	Uncredited
1956	A Touch of the Sun	Honeymooner	Uncredited
1958	Six-Five Special	Himself	
1958	Record Roundabout	Himself	
1960	Alice Through the Looking Box	Red King	Television movie
1960	Escort for Hire	Buzz	
1960	Transatlantic	Robert Stanton	
1961	A Taste of Money	Dave	
1962	Design for Loving	Lloyd Stanford	
1962	Behave Yourself	unknown	
1962	It's Trad, Dad!	Himself	
1963	The Cool Mikado	Man in Boudoir	
1969	Otley	Radio presenter	Voice only
1970	Simon, Simon	Fireman	
1970	Cool It Carol!	Man at party	

=== Television ===
Year	Title	Role	Notes
1956	ITV Play of the Week	Richard Hilary	One episode
1956	Hit the Limit	Himself / host	Six episodes
1956—1962	Spot the Tune	Himself / host	
1957	These Are The Shows	Himself	Television special
1957	Pantomania: Babes in the Wood	Himself	Television special
1957—1958	Six-Five Special	Himself / host	Fifty-seven episodes
1959	Eurovision Song Contest 1959	Himself / host	Commentator
1959—1979	Juke Box Jury	Himself	Seventy-eight episodes
1960	Man from Interpol	Haynes	One episode
1960	Maigret	Philippe	One episode
1960	Dial for Music	Himself / host	Four episodes
1960	This is Bobby Darin	Himself / host	Television special
1960	Saturday Spectacular	Himself	One episode
1960	The Tin Pan Alley Show	Himself / host	One episode
1960	Laugh Line	Himself / host	Nine episodes
1960—1961	Summerhouse	Himself	Two episodes
1961	Boyd Q.C.	David Spencer	One episode
1961	The Men from Room 13	Curly Elphick	Two episodes
1961	Call me Captain	Himself / narrator	
1961—1966	Thank Your Lucky Stars	Himself / host	Thirty-three episodes
1961–1964	Happily Ever After	Peter Morgan	Twelve episodes
1962	Winning Widows	Flint Clarke	Two episodes
1963	Hancock	Compere	One episode
1963	Jezebel ex UK	Larry	One episode
1963	Don't Say a Word	Himself	One episode
1963	The Larkins	Himself	One episode
1963	Music Match	Himself / host	
1964	One Night Stand	Himself / host	
1964	Open House	Himself / host	
1964	Drama 61-67	Himself	One episode
1964	Highlight: The Singing Cinema	Himself	
1964—1988	Top of the Pops	Himself / host	One hundred and two episodes
1965	Val Parnell's Sunday Night at the London Palladium	Himself	One episode
1965	Cribbins	Himself	
1965	Is Your IQ Ok?	Himself	
1965–1967	No Hiding Place	Frank Dorman (1965) Bobby Vowles (1967)	Two episodes
1965—1966	Glamour...	Himself / host	Eleven episodes
1966	SOS: The Record Star Show	Himself / host	
1966	Action	Himself / host	Three episodes
1966	New Musical Express Poll Winner's Concert	Himself / host	Television special
1966	Countdown	Himself	One episode
1966	A Royal Gala	Himself	Television special
1966—1972	Quiz Ball	Himself	
1967	The Record Star Show	Himself / host	
1967	How to Live with a Neurotic Dog	Himself / narrator	
1967	Carnival Time	Himself / host	Thirteen episodes
1968	Mum's Boys	Robin Fosdyke	Seven episodes
1968	The Dickie Henderson Show	Himself	One episode
1969	Come Dancing	Himself	One episode
1969	Miss World 1969	Himself / host	
1970	A Present for Dickie	Himself / host	One episode
1970	Mike and Bernie's Scene	Himself	One episode
1970	Under the Table You Must Go	Himself	One episode
1970	Time Out for Sardinia	Himself / narrator	One episode
1970—1971	The Golden Shot	Himself / host	Seven episodes
1971	The Melodies Linger On	Himself / host	
1972	The Two Ronnies	Host	Television special
1972—1973	The Morecambe & Wise Show	Major Ivor Request (1972) Himself (1973)	Two episodes
1973—1995	This Is Your Life	Himself	Eight episodes
1973—1978	The Generation Game	Himself	Two episodes
1973—1977	Whose Baby?	Himself	Three episodes
1973—1976	Password	Himself	Three episodes
1973—1974	Jokers Wild	Himself	Six episodes
1974	Whodunnit?	Panelist	One episode
1974	Just a Nimmo	Himself	One episode
1974	Danny La Rue: The Ladies I Love	Himself	Television film
1974	Fifty Bighearted Years: The Variety Club of Great Britain's Tribute to Arthur Askey	Himself / host	
1974	Radio Wonderful	Himself	Short
1974—1976	Looks Familiar	Himself	Three episodes
1974–1975	Second Time Around	Disc Jockey	Two episodes
1975	Eurovision Song Contest 1975	Himself	Commentator
1975	Parkinson	Himself	One episode
1975	The Book Programme	Himself	One episode
1975	Look Who's Talking	Himself	Two episodes
1975—1978	Celebrity Squares	Himself	Six episodes
1975—1976	Husband of the Year	Himself	Six episodes
1976	Saturday Night at the Mill	Himself	One episode
1976	Going a Bundle	Himself	One episode
1976	Nobody Does It Like Marti	Himself	One episode
1976	The Val Doonican Show	Himself	One episode
1977	The Mike Reid Show	Himself	One episode
1977	Eurovision Song Contest 1977	Himself	Commentator
1977	Pop at the Mill	Himself / host	Six episodes
1979	Pebble Mill at One	Himself / host	One episode
1979—1985	Blankety Blank	Himself	Six episodes
1980	Night of One Hundred Stars	Himself	Television movie
1980—1982	Give Us a Clue	Himself	Three episodes
1981	It's a Knockout	Himself	One episode
1981	Family Fortunes	Himself	One episode
1981—1983	Punchlines	Himself	Five episodes
1982	Pete Murray Takes You to Nottingham	Himself / narrator	
1982	Tuesday's Documentary	Himself	One episode
1982	The Royal Variety Performance 1982	Himself	Television special
1983	The Time of Your Life	Himself	One episode
1983	Pete Murray Takes You to Coventry	Himself / narrator	
1983	Pete Murray Takes You to Hastings	Himself / narrator	
1984—1992	Fotry Minutes	Himself	Two episodes
1985	Vintage Quiz	Himself	Three episodes
1986	Chasing Rainbows - A Nation and Its Music	Himself	One episode
1987	Wogan	Himself	One episode
1988	A Question of Entertainment	Himself	One episode
1989	Alexei Sayle's Stuff	Himself	One episode
1989	Scene	Himself	One episode, uncredited
1989—1999	Arena	Himself	Three episodes
1990	Dors: The Other Diana	Himself	Television movie
1991	The Happening	Himself	Television movie
1991	The Cook Report	Himself	One episode
1995	Countdown	Himself / dictionary corner	Four episodes
2002	Jukebox Heroes	Himself	
2004	Rove Live	Himself	
2005	Favouritism	Himself	One episode
2006	The Story of Light Entertainment	Himself	Two episodes
2007	Children's Trial on TV	Himself	One episode
2009	Weakest Link	Himself	One episode
2015	The David Hamilton Show	Himself	One episode
2020	The One Show	Himself	One episode
2025	BBC News at Ten	Himself	One episode

== Discography ==
=== Singles ===
Year	Label	A-side	B-side
1960	Decca Records	"What's It All About Eh?"	"Gee Ma I Wanna Go Home"
1978	Columbia Records	"Forever Young"	"I'll Be Alright"

== Publications ==
- (With Jeremy Hornsby) One Day I'll Forget My Trousers (autobiography), London, 1975. ISBN 0-903925-31-1

== See also ==
- List of centenarians (actors, filmmakers and entertainers)

Preceded by David Vine	Eurovision Song Contest UK Commentator; 1975	Succeeded by Michael Aspel
Preceded by Michael Aspel	Eurovision Song Contest UK Commentator; 1977	Succeeded by Terry Wogan
