= Maurice Kinn =

British music publisher and journalist (1924–2000)

Maurice Irving Kinn (2 June 1924 – 3 August 2000) was a British music publisher and journalist. He was proprietor of the New Musical Express (NME) from 1952 to 1963, during which time the publication expanded its circulation and coverage of popular music. During this period, the NME introduced a UK singles chart based on record sales and organised the Poll Winners’ Concerts, which featured prominent popular music acts of the period, including the Beatles and the Rolling Stones.

== Early life and career ==
Kinn was born in Limehouse, London, in 1924. He attended Kent Coast College but left education at the age of 14. He later worked part-time at Dreamland amusement park in Margate, where his parents operated a boarding house. He began his career as a junior reporter at Boxing Times before moving into music promotion. By the late 1940s and early 1950s, he was organising dances and concerts at UK dance halls. In 1951, he established his own agency representing bandleaders including Ambrose, Ivy Benson, Joe Loss, and Cyril Stapleton.

== Acquisition of the New Musical Express ==
In late 1952, Kinn was informed by Les Perrin, news editor of Musical Express, that the publication was likely to close unless a buyer could be found. At the time, circulation was approximately 15,000. Kinn purchased the title for £1,000, renamed it the New Musical Express (NME), and became its owner.

== Development of the NME and UK charts ==
Following the acquisition, the paper was initially unprofitable, and Kinn continued to operate his agency to support it financially. Two months after the purchase, he borrowed £1,000 from his father-in-law to maintain operations.

At the time, the NME’s chart was based on sheet music sales. Under Kinn’s direction, advertising manager Percy Dickins collected weekly sales figures from record shops to compile a chart based on record sales. Editorial focus increasingly shifted toward popular vocal performers, including Johnnie Ray, Frank Sinatra, and Nat King Cole.

Promotional strategies included distributing complimentary copies of the paper outside dance halls and advertising on Radio Luxembourg. In 1953, the NME introduced a readers’ poll, which led to the first Poll Winners’ Concert, held at the Royal Albert Hall. Circulation later rose to approximately 100,000 copies per week.

During the 1950s, the NME promoted visiting American artists including Billie Holiday, Sarah Vaughan, Stan Kenton, and Mel Tormé. Holiday’s appearance was her only UK performance. Kinn was also involved in lifting a long-standing ban on reciprocal exchanges between UK and US musicians, facilitating a six-week UK tour by Stan Kenton followed by a US tour by Ted Heath.

== Journalism and notable coverage ==
Kinn invited entertainers including Frank Sinatra, Fred Astaire, Doris Day, Sammy Davis Jr., and Dean Martin to contribute articles to the NME. He covered one of Elvis Presley's early concerts at Pearl Harbor and secured Presley’s first interview in a British newspaper.

Writing under the pseudonym “Alley Cat”, Kinn authored a weekly gossip and opinion column. Broadcaster David Frost later described the column as “the best of its kind”.

== NME Poll Winners’ Concerts ==
By the mid-1960s, the NME Poll Winners’ Concerts featured acts including the Beatles, the Rolling Stones, the Who, the Small Faces, the Yardbirds, Roy Orbison, Dusty Springfield, and Cliff Richard. The 1968 concert included the Rolling Stones’ first live performance of “Jumpin’ Jack Flash” and marked Brian Jones’ final live appearance with the group.

== Relationship with the Beatles ==
The NME provided exclusive British coverage of the Beatles’ first US tour. Kinn and his wife Berenice developed a personal relationship with the band’s manager, Brian Epstein, and attended the Beatles’ appearance on The Ed Sullivan Show in Miami in 1964.

At the 1966 Poll Winners’ Concert, Kinn disagreed with John Lennon and Epstein regarding the Beatles’ performance order. According to Beatles ’66 by Steve Turner, Lennon told Kinn, “We’ll never ever play for you again”. The group did not subsequently perform another UK concert.

== Sale of the NME and later career ==
In 1963, IPC Media acquired the NME for £500,000, with Kinn remaining as executive director for a further ten years. During this period, circulation increased substantially, and the publication became the UK’s highest-selling weekly music newspaper.

After leaving the NME in 1973, Kinn attempted to acquire Record Retailer and The Stage, though both efforts were unsuccessful. In later years, he ran a florist business, worked as a consultant to record companies, contributed to national newspapers, and promoted concerts by artists including Status Quo, David Essex, and the Electric Light Orchestra.

== Personal life and death ==
Kinn married Berenice in 1951. He had two children and three grandchildren. He was a lifelong supporter of Arsenal F.C. and a member of the Marylebone Cricket Club. He was made a Freeman of the City of London in 1996 and received a BASCA Gold Badge Award for contributions to the British entertainment industry.

He died in London of cancer on 3 August 2000 at the age of 76 and was buried in Edgwarebury Cemetery, London.
