= Rome Express =

1932 film

- Theatrical release poster
- Directed by: Walter Forde
- Written by: Ralph Stock (dialogue); Frank Vosper (dialogue)
- Screenplay by: Sidney Gilliat
- Story by: Clifford Grey
- Produced by: Michael Balcon
- Starring: Esther Ralston; Conrad Veidt; Hugh Williams
- Cinematography: Günther Krampf
- Edited by: Fredrick Y. Smith
- Music by: Leighton Lucas (uncredited)
- Production company: Gaumont British
- Distributed by: Gaumont British (UK); Universal (US)
- Release date: 21 November 1932
- Running time: 94 minutes
- Country: United Kingdom
- Language: English
- Budget: less than $150,000
- Box office: $600,000 (est. for UK)

Rome Express (also known as The Midnight Special) is a 1932 British thriller film directed by Walter Forde and starring Esther Ralston and Conrad Veidt. Based on a story by Clifford Grey, with a screenplay by Sidney Gilliat, the film is a tale about a European express train to Rome carrying diverse characters, including thieves, adulterers, blackmail victims, and an American film star.

It has been called "one of the most ambitious productions that Gaumont had made up to that time" and "is regarded as the high point of director Walter Forde's career."

Rome Express was remade as Halfway to Shanghai (1942) and Sleeping Car to Trieste (1948).

== Plot ==
The film is centred almost entirely on the Compagnie Internationale des Wagons-Lits train the Rome Express, travelling between Paris and Rome. As the train is departing from a station in Paris, Zurta and his colleague Tony manage to board. They have found out that someone they want to see is on board.

Another passenger, McBain, a wealthy businessman travelling with his brow-beaten secretary/valet, Mills, learns that a painting by Van Dyck, which he had previously tried to buy and which had later been stolen, has not been recovered and says he would do anything to obtain it. Also on the train are an adulterous couple, an annoyingly sociable Englishman, a French police inspector, and an American film star who is tiring of her fame, accompanied by her manager/publicist.

It transpires that the stolen painting is in the possession of a man, Poole, who conspicuously keeps his briefcase close to him at all times. When he agrees to join a poker game, he finds that one of the other players is Zurta, and Poole's reaction shows that they know each other. Poole is disconcerted and carelessly sets down his briefcase, which is later innocently taken by Mills, who has a similar briefcase.

After the game ends, Zurta follows Poole to his compartment, forces his way in and confronts Poole, who offers to hand over the painting but finds he has the wrong briefcase. After Zurta threatens to throw him from the train, they struggle and Poole is killed.

Meanwhile, McBain discovers in Mills' briefcase the stolen Van Dyck he had wanted to buy. When Poole's body is discovered by an attendant, the police inspector begins an investigation and interviews all those who have been in contact with Poole. Zurta learns that the briefcases have been switched and tries to recover it from McBain's compartment, but is apprehended by McBain and Mills until the inspector arrives. Then Mills discovers the stolen painting hidden in McBain's compartment and realizes that McBain found it. He tries to use it to blackmail McBain, but McBain outwits him and takes it to the police. As the police inspector begins to suspect him, Zurta leaps from the train in an attempt to escape, but is killed.

== Cast ==
- Esther Ralston as Asta Marvelle
- Conrad Veidt as Zurta
- Harold Huth as George Grant
- Cedric Hardwicke as Alistair McBain
- Joan Barry as Mrs Maxted
- Gordon Harker as Tom Bishop
- Donald Calthrop as Poole
- Hugh Williams as Tony
- Frank Vosper as M. Jolif
- Finlay Currie as Sam the publicist
- Eliot Makeham as Mills
- Muriel Aked as spinster

== Production ==
It was the first film made at Lime Grove Studios in Shepherd's Bush. It was part of a slate of 40 films from Gaumont British worth £750,000.

The film's sets were designed by the art director Andrew Mazzei, with the costume design by Gordon Conway. It was the first British film for Conrad Veidt. Esther Ralston was imported from Hollywood.

Ralston recalled "It was a real joy filming Rome Express and, owing to the magnificent English photography, I never looked better."

Princess Marie Louise of Austria visited the set during filming.

== Release ==
The film was picked up for distribution in the US by Universal Pictures.

== Reception ==
=== Box office ===
According to the BFI the movie "was an enormous commercial hit, and a big critical success too."

The film was popular in America at a time when that was rare for British films. It was one of only three British movies to be shown widely in 1933, the others being Be Mine Tonight (1932) and The Private Life of Henry VIII (1933).

=== Critical ===
"Jolo", a British reviewer for Variety, called it: "One of the best pictures made in this country, and, all things considered, one of the best feature pictures ever made anywhere. The cast is impressive. No Hollywood all-star aggregation could have done better. The technique is Continental... No detail is lacking, and apparently no expense was spared...properly exploited, should be a tremendous success in America. It is a certain hit in England."

"Kauf", an American reviewer for Variety, called it "probably the best British film shown over here to date... It should draw considerable critical attention and a certain amount of word-of-mouth. Won't roll up important grosses, but nicely... Original in conception and execution. Casting is superb and the players all excellent."

The Daily Telegraph called it "the best British picture yet made."

== Accolades ==
The film won the American National Board of Review award for Best Foreign Film.

== Legacy ==
Isidore Ostrer of Gaumont British stated the film changed studio policy on making movies:

For a long time, we thought it was better to make pictures for customers in the provinces rather than from an international point of view or even with direct London box-office appeal.... It seemed unwise... to spend more than an average of $100,000 on a production... We simply weren't willing to gamble more money. Then, quite by accident we made Rome Express. The picture cost more than we had been spending. It had a faster dramatic tempo. It did remarkably well. Subsequently, we imported American electrical equipment... We followed Rome Express with Good Companions and I Was a Spy, pictures almost as successful as Rome Express. These cost from $200,000 to $300,000. Their success told us that extended budgets were wise.

Gaumont subsequently made Channel Crossing which was similar in ways to Rome Express. Screenwriter Sidney Gilliat later wrote a number of other movies set on trains, including Seven Sinners, The Lady Vanishes and Night Train to Munich.

The film was remade as Sleeping Car to Trieste (1948). Like in that movie, details of the 'back story' of the film are few. Zurta appears to be a professional criminal who organised the art theft. McBain has previously attempted to buy the painting.

A novelisation of the film was written by English author Ruth Alexander and published in 1932 by Readers Library Publishing Co..
