= George H. Brown (producer) =

British film producer (1913–2001)

George H. Brown (1913–2001) was a British film producer.

== Early life ==
His father, a pilot in the Royal Flying Corps, was shot down and taken prisoner by the Germans during the First World War. He went to live with relatives in Barcelona. His mother, Nancy Hambley Hughes, was a musical theatre singer with the D'Oyly Carte Company.

Brown worked as a stuntman, bit player, singer and dancer. He worked as third assistant director on The House of the Spaniard (1936), and was assistant director on Erich Pommer's Fire Over England (1936). After Pommer and Charles Laughton formed their independent film production company, Mayflower Pictures, he became their production assistant, working on all three of their films (Vessel of Wrath (1938), St. Martin's Lane (1938), and Jamaica Inn (1939)). In June 1939, he married Maureen O'Hara, who had been under an exclusive contract for a year with Mayflower Pictures and had co-starred in Jamaica Inn; the wedding took place only fifteen hours before she left for Hollywood to film The Hunchback of Notre Dame. Their marriage was annulled in 1941, once it was clear that O'Hara had made Hollywood her permanent home. Brown then went to work on The Proud Valley (1939).

During World War II, he worked in the RAF Film Unit in the North African desert.

His breakthrough film as producer was Hotel Sahara (1951) based on his own story for which he raised finance.

Brown produced two films based on Catherine Cookson novels starring John Gregson, Jacqueline and Rooney.

He remarried in 1948 to Bettina Kohr who predeceased him in 1998. They had a daughter Tina and a son Christopher.

== Select credits ==
- The House of the Spaniard (1936) – 3rd AD
- Fire Over England (1936) – 1st AD
- Vessel of Wrath (1938) – production associate
- St Martin's Lane (1938) – production associate
- Jamaica Inn (1939) – production associate
- The Proud Valley (1940) – production associate
- 49th Parallel (1941) – in charge of production
- Journey Together (1945) – associate producer
- School for Secrets (1946) – co-producer
- Vice Versa (1947) – producer
- Fame is the Spur (1947) – producer
- Sleeping Car to Trieste (1948) – producer
- The Chiltern Hundreds (1949) – producer
- Hotel Sahara (1951) – writer, producer
- Made in Heaven (1952) – producer, story
- Desperate Moment (1953) – producer, writer
- The Seekers (1954) – producer
- Jacqueline (1956) – producer
- Dangerous Exile (1957) – producer
- Rooney (1958)
- Tommy the Toreador (1959) – producer, writer
- The Boy Who Stole a Million (1960) – producer
- Double Bunk (1961) – producer
- Murder She Said (1961) – producer
- Village of Daughters (1962) – producer
- Kill or Cure (1962) – producer
- Murder at the Gallop (1963)
- Ladies Who Do (1963) – producer
- Go Kart Go (1964) – producer
- Guns at Batasi (1964) – producer
- Runaway Railway (1966) – producer
- Finders Keepers (1966) – story, producer
- The Trap (1966) – producer
- A Ghost of a Chance (1967) – producer
- The Waiters (1968) (short) – producer
- Up in the Air (1969) – producer
- Hoverbug (1969) – producer
- Assault (1971) – producer
- Revenge (1971) - producer
- All Coppers Are... (1972) – producer
- Innocent Bystanders (1973) – producer
- Penny Gold (1974) – producer
- Open Season (1974) – producer
