= American Cinema Editors Awards 1965 =

15th ACE Eddie Awards
- Presented by: American Cinema Editors
- Date: March 21, 1965
- Site: Coconut Grove, Los Angeles, California
- Hosted by: Pat Buttram
- Produced by: Lamont Johnson
- Directed by: Lamont Johnson

Highlights
- Best Film: Mary Poppins (editing); My Fair Lady (overall)
- Most awards: Mary Poppins (3)
- Most nominations: Mary Poppins (4)

Television coverage
- Network: KABC-TV

The 15th American Cinema Editors Eddie Awards, which were presented on Sunday, March 14, 1965, at the Coconut Grove, honored the best editors in films and television. This was the first-ever award ceremony that introduced the concept of the "Eddie Awards", complete with the unveiling of the "Eddie" statuette. The four categories that were introduced were Outstanding Picture of the Year, Best Foreign or Documentary Film, Best Performance by an Actor in a Film Debut, and Best Performance by an Actress in a Film Debut. There were a total of six awards, upped from three in the previous year. The award ceremony was hosted by character actor Pat Buttram.

For the first time in the history of the award ceremony, the award was broadcast live on television, airing on the Los Angeles affiliate station KABC-TV. The broadcast was produced and directed by Lamont Johnson with music by bandleader Freddie Martin. After the presentations, singer and actress Barbara McNair hosted the floor show. Former president Harry S. Truman also won the awards' first ever "Most Outstanding Television Personality" award. David M. Noyes, producer of the show and Truman's former advisor, accepted the award on his behalf.

== Nominees ==
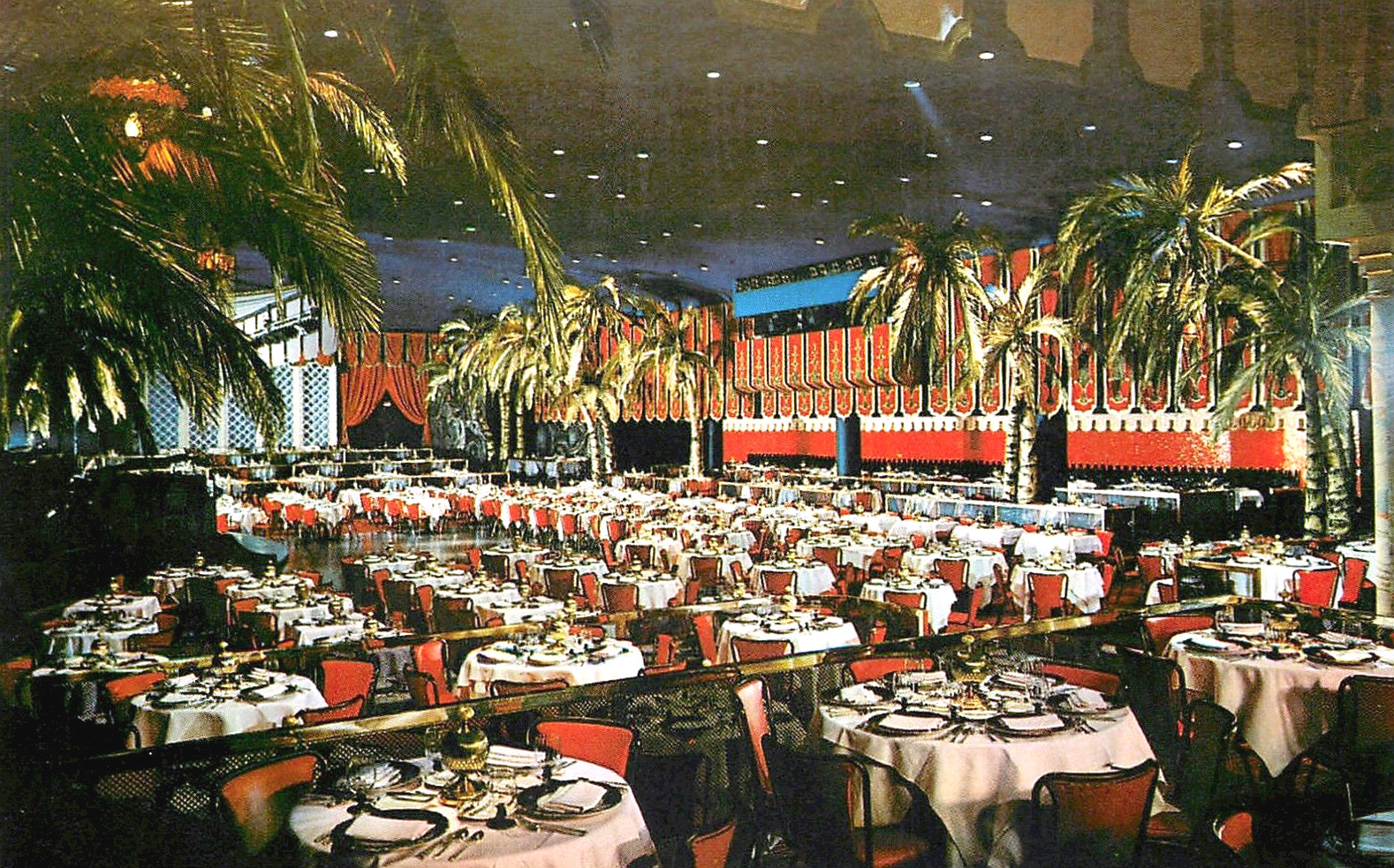
Ambassador Hotel Cocoanut Grove interior in 1965

Best Edited Feature Film	Outstanding Picture of the Year
Mary Poppins – Cotton Warburton; Becket – Anne V. Coates; My Fair Lady – William H. Ziegler; The Unsinkable Molly Brown – Fredric Steinkamp; What a Way to Go! – Marjorie Fowler	My Fair Lady; Mary Poppins; Becket; Topkapi; The Unsinkable Molly Brown
Best Edited Television Program	Best Edited Foreign or Documentary Film
Rawhide: "No Dogs or Drovers" – Gene Fowler Jr.; Bewitched: "I, Darrin, Take This Witch, Samantha" – Michael Luciano and Gerard Wilson; The Man from U.N.C.L.E.: "The Deadly Games Affair" – Joseph Dervin; Slattery's People: "Do the Ignorant Sleep in Pure White Beds?" – Daniel A. Nathan; Wagon Train: "Little Girl Lost" – Gene Palmer	Topkapi; Rhino!; The Organizer; Marriage Italian Style; Zorba the Greek
Best Performance by an Actor in a Film Debut	Best Performance by an Actress in a Film Debut
David Tomlinson – Mary Poppins; Stanley Holloway – My Fair Lady; Harve Presnell – The Unsinkable Molly Brown; Donnelly Rhodes – The Alfred Hitchcock Hour: "Ten Minutes from Now"; John Leyton – Guns at Batasi	Julie Andrews – Mary Poppins; Daniela Bianchi – Dr. Kildare: "Rome Will Never Leave You"; Kim Darby – Mr. Novak: "To Lodge and Dislodge"; Mary Ann Mobley – Get Yourself a College Girl; Tippy Walker – The World of Henry Orient
