= Made in Heaven (1952 film) =

- Original British 3-sheet poster
- Directed by: John Paddy Carstairs
- Screenplay by: George H. Brown; William Douglas-Home
- Produced by: George H. Brown
- Starring: David Tomlinson; Petula Clark; Sonja Ziemann; A. E. Matthews
- Cinematography: Geoffrey Unsworth
- Edited by: John D. Guthridge
- Music by: Philip Martell (musical director); Ronald Hanmer (composer)
- Production company: Fanfare Productions
- Distributed by: General Film Distributors (UK)
- Release date: November 1952; (UK)
- Running time: 90 minutes
- Country: United Kingdom
- Language: English

Made in Heaven is a 1952 British Technicolor comedy film directed by John Paddy Carstairs which stars David Tomlinson, Petula Clark and Sonja Ziemann. The screenplay was by George H. Brown and William Douglas-Home.

== Plot ==
Young married couple Basil and Julie Topham enter the ancient annual Dunmow Flitch Trials (in which a married couple can win a side of bacon if at the end of one year, they have 'not wisht themselves unmarried again'). However, the Tophams' happy household, and then an entire village is thrown into chaos with the arrival of an attractive Hungarian housemaid.

== Cast ==
- David Tomlinson as Basil Topham
- Petula Clark as Julie Topham
- Sonja Ziemann as Marta
- A. E. Matthews as Hillary Topham (Grandpa)
- Charles Victor as Aubrey Topham
- Sophie Stewart as Marjorie Topham
- Philip Stainton as Stanley Grimes
- Richard Wattis as Hayworth Honeycroft, the vicar
- Michael Brennan as Sergeant Marne
- Alfie Bass as Bert Jenkins
- Dora Bryan as Ethel Jenkins
- Ferdy Mayne as István
- Athene Seyler as Miss Rosabelle Honeycroft (the vicar's sister)
- Harold Kasket as the fat man
- George Bishop as the bishop
- Margot Lister as bishop's Wife
- John Warren as Keeper of the Wheel
- Ronnie Stevens as TV announcer
- Gilbert Davis as TV gent
- Stuart Latham as porter
- Vernon Morris as Dick
- Vincent Ball as man at party

== Production ==
The film was based on an original story by producer George Brown and author William Douglas Home, which in turn was based on the real-life Dunmow fitch trial, where a prize is given to a couple who can prove they have not disagreed for a year. Brown had just made the popoular comedy Hotel Sahara (1951) also based on his story.

The film was made through British Film-Makers, a short lived production scheme that operated in Britain in the early 1950s as a co operative venture between the Rank Organisation and the National Film Finance Corporation (NFFC), whereby Rank would provide 70% of finance and the rest came from the NFFC.

David Tomlinson and Petula Clark (who was only 19) were attached as stars early. George Brown interviewed over 200 European actresses to play the lead. "The story demands a foreign actress," said Brown. Sonja Ziemann got the role. A question about her employment over a local actress was raised in Parliament but Equity had no objection.

It was shot at Pinewood Studios outside London in May 1952. The film's sets were designed by the art director Maurice Carter.

== Critical reception ==
Variety wrote, "Humor and situations are forced. Quota ticket, color and local marquee names will be a selling aid at home, but even the novelty of them cannot be of much help overseas... [The writers] appear to have deliberately avoided any thought of achieving conviction and have amassed a collection of broad sequences which are dressed in the most improbable light. Result is a light-hearted mixture which is neither good comedy nor boisterous farce. "

The Evening Standard called it "all very harmless, energetic and oh so familiar." The Guardian called it "a Technicolor British film comedy of a sort which (in spite of the Technicolor) is venerable, gentle, and even at this date likeable." Filmink wrote it "was from the producer/writer of Hotel Sahara, but lacks that film's sense of fun and well cast stars. For instance, Petula Clark, while charming, is far too young to play a bride who needs a maid, and Sonja Ziemann is a dull import."

The Monthly Film Bulletin wrote: "A simple-minded comedy giving a curious view of the English middle classes, who are always dressing up, for the Flitch contest, for square daricing, for amateur theatricals. These antics make the players look foolish but not, unfortunately, funny. Some time-worn jokes – mainly struggles with the English language – a pleasant, bumbling performance from A. E. Matthews, and a general failure to achieve the requisite lightness of touch. "

Picturegoer wrote, ". . .when you get down to analysing the ingredients, it's just cream-puff comedy, really – and the least bit stale cream puff at that. The main thing though is not to analyse but to swallow it whole and enjoy it. It's well-tried and not always especially true British comedy, but the film has a happy air about it. Attractively grown-up Pet Clark turns in a sparkling performance as the doubting young wife. She manages to hold her own against the devastating eyelashes and flashing, wicked smiles of Sonja Ziemann as the hired help. But it's the old hands at this kind of comedy who really carry the fun along: David Tomlinson, Charles Victor and A. E. Matthews, as son, father and grandfather respectively, all stock characters. Yes it's all gay and merry. It has a springtime spirit – and a springtime look, too in its spruce, sunny Technicolour."

The Radio Times concluded, "Vicar Richard Wattis and his stern sister (Athene Seyler) add considerably to the fun, which is steadily directed in an amiably sitcom-like way by John Paddy Carstairs and glossily photographed by Geoffrey Unsworth."
