= Harold Kasket =

English actor (1926–2002)

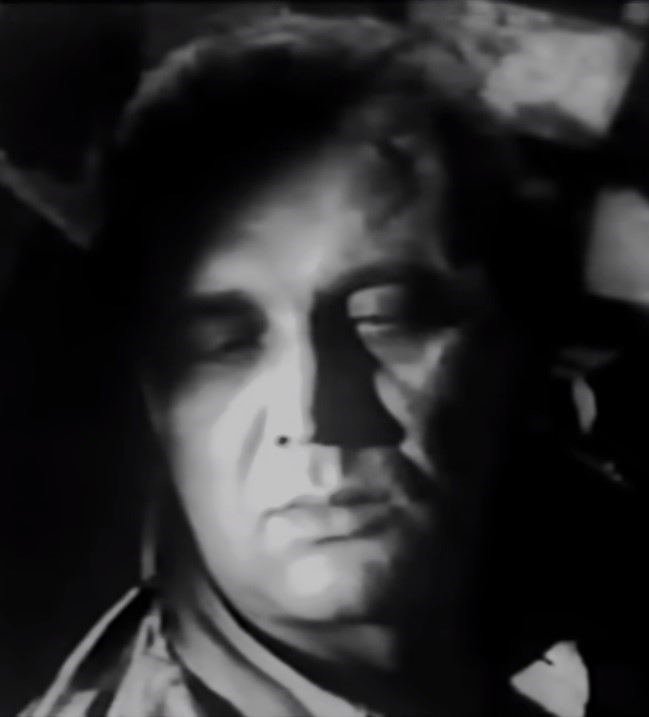
- Kasket in an episode of One Step Beyond (1961)
- Born: 26 July 1926; St Pancras, London, England
- Died: 20 January 2002 (aged 75); Camden, London, England
- Occupation: Actor
- Years active: 1948-1989

Harold Kasket (26 July 1926 – 20 January 2002) was an English actor in theatre, films and later television from the 1940s. Kasket usually played Arabs or mainland European types in many films and TV programmes such as Maigret, The Saint, Danger Man, Z-Cars, The Avengers, Department S as Korlandt in the episode The Perfect Operation, The Tomorrow People.

His theatre work included appearances with Laurence Olivier and Vivien Leigh on Broadway in Caesar and Cleopatra in 1951; and playing Uncle Ben opposite Warren Mitchell at the National Theatre in Death of a Salesman in 1979.

His last role was in the TV mini series War and Remembrance (1988).

He died in his native London.

== Selected filmography ==
- No Orchids for Miss Blandish (1948) - (uncredited)
- Children of Chance (1949) - (uncredited)
- Hotel Sahara (1951) - Oriental Gentleman (uncredited)
- Made in Heaven (1952) - The Fat Man (uncredited)
- Moulin Rouge (1952) - Charles Zidler
- The House of the Arrow (1953) - Boris Wabersky
- Saadia (1953) - Sheikh of Inimert
- Up to His Neck (1954) - Croupier (uncredited)
- Beau Brummell (1954) - Mayor
- One Good Turn (1955) - Ivor Petrovitch
- Out of the Clouds (1955) - Hafadi
- The Dark Avenger (1955) - Arnaud
- A Kid for Two Farthings (1955) - (uncredited)
- Doctor at Sea (1955) - Policeman in Prison (uncredited)
- Man of the Moment (1955) - Enrico
- The Man Who Knew Too Much (1956) - Stavis, Embassy Butler (uncredited)
- Bhowani Junction (1956) - Proprietor of Restaurant (uncredited)
- Interpol (1957) - Kalish
- The Adventures of Robin Hood - The Bandit of Brittany (1957) - Jacques
- The Key Man (1957) - Dimitriadi
- Manuela (1957) - Pereira
- The Naked Earth (1958) - Arab Captain
- A Tale of Two Cities (1958) - Jailer (uncredited)
- Wonderful Things! (1958) - Poppa
- The 7th Voyage of Sinbad (1958) - Sultan
- The Navy Lark (1959) - Gaston Higgins
- The Heart of a Man (1959) - Oskar
- The Lady Is a Square (1959) - Spolenski
- Whirlpool (1959) - Stiebel
- Carlton-Browne of the F.O. (1959) - Minor Role (uncredited)
- The Mouse That Roared (1959) - Pedro
- The Scapegoat (1959) - (uncredited)
- Face of Fire (1959) - Reifsnyder, the barber
- SOS Pacific (1959) - Monk
- Tommy the Toreador (1959) - Jose
- Life Is a Circus (1960) - Hassan
- The Boy Who Stole a Million (1960) - Luis
- Sands of the Desert (1960) - Abdulla
- The Fourth Square (1961) - Philippe
- The Greengage Summer (1961) - Monsieur Prideaux
- A Weekend with Lulu (1961) - Bon Viveur (uncredited)
- The Green Helmet (1961) - Lupi
- The Roman Spring of Mrs. Stone (1961) - Tailor
- Village of Daughters (1962) - Bus driver
- Nine Hours to Rama (1963) - Datta
- The Yellow Rolls-Royce (1964) - Italian Garage Owner (uncredited)
- The Return of Mr. Moto (1965) - Shahrdar of Wadi
- Doctor in Clover (1966) - Husband in French Movie (uncredited)
- Arabesque (1966) - Mohammed Lufti
- Follow That Camel (1967) - Hotel Gentleman (uncredited)
- Where's Jack? (1969) - The King
- Trail of the Pink Panther (1982) - President Sandover Haleesh
- Curse of the Pink Panther (1983) - President Sandover Haleesh
- A.D. (1985) - Caiaphas
