= American Cinema Editors Awards 1966 =

16th ACE Eddie Awards
- Presented by: American Cinema Editors
- Date: March 27, 1966
- Site: Coconut Grove, Los Angeles, California
- Hosted by: George Jessel
- Directed by: Bill Stierwalt

Highlights
- Best Film: The Sound of Music (editing); The Sound of Music (overall)
- Most awards: Sound of Music (4)
- Most nominations: Sound of Music (4)

Television coverage
- Network: KCOP-TV

The 16th American Cinema Editors Eddie Awards, which were presented on Sunday, March 27, 1966, at the Coconut Grove, honored the best editors in films and television. On January 24, 1966, president Gene Fowler announced the nominations. The five categories that were introduced were Best Performance by an Actor, Best Performance by an Actress, Outstanding Television Program of the Year, Best Performance by an Actor in a Television Program, and Best Performance by an Actress in a Television Program. There were a total of ten awards, upped from six in the previous year. The award ceremony was hosted by actor George Jessel.

For a second year in a row, the award was broadcast live on television, moving from the Los Angeles affiliate station KABC-TV to KCOP-TV. It aired as an hour-special starting at 8 pm. The broadcast was directed by Bill Stierwalt and featured music by bandleader Dick Stabile. The opening song for the award ceremony was "The Song of A.C.E.", written by composer Earle Hagen

== Nominees ==
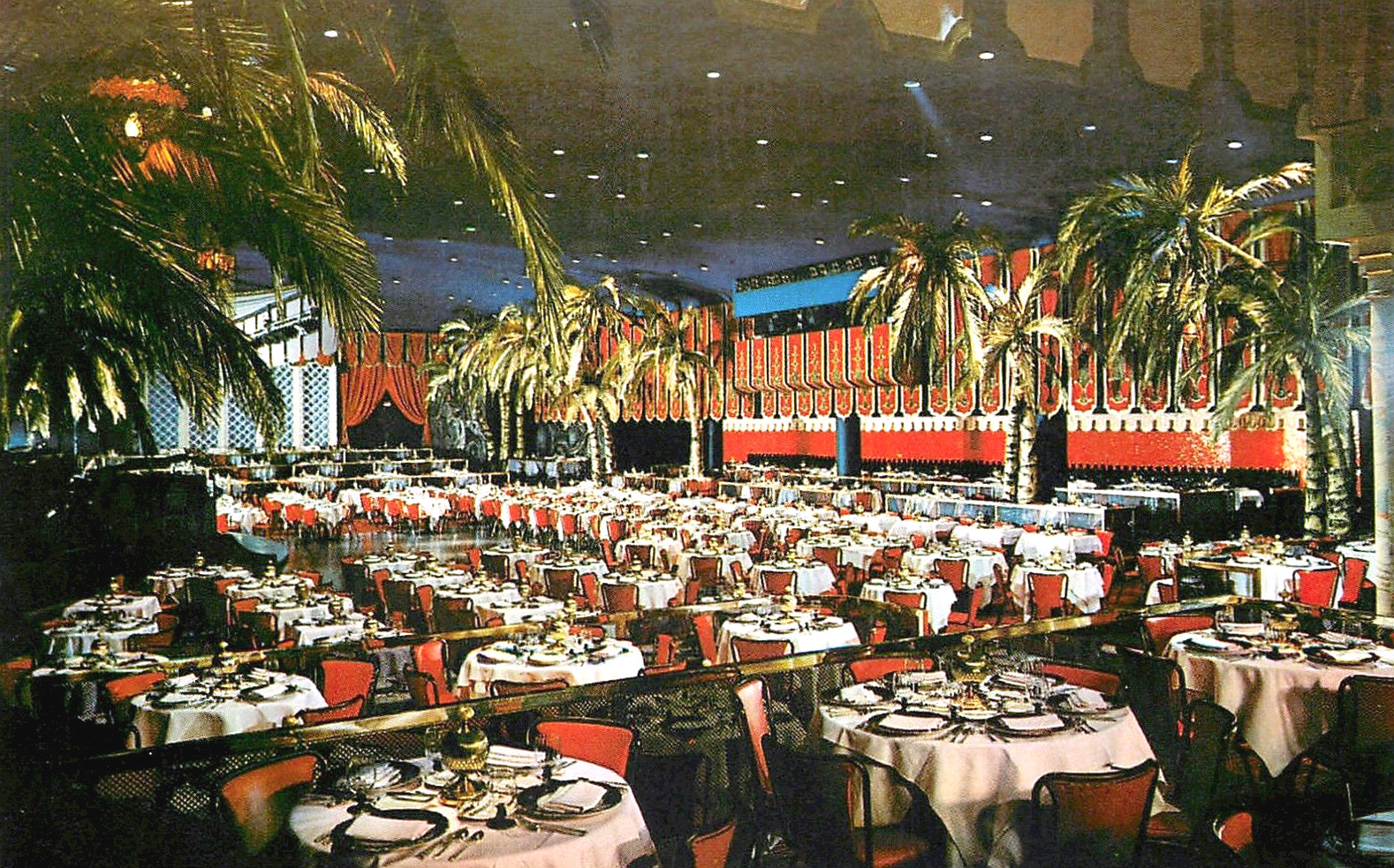
Ambassador Hotel Cocoanut Grove interior in 1965

=== Film ===
Best Edited Feature Film	Outstanding Picture of the Year
The Sound of Music – William Reynolds; Dear Brigitte – Marjorie Fowler; The Flight of the Phoenix – Michael Luciano; A Thousand Clowns – Ralph Rosenblum; Tokyo Olympiad – Yoshio Ebara	The Sound of Music; Doctor Zhivago; Those Magnificent Men in Their Flying Machines; A Thousand Clowns; Tokyo Olympiad
Best Performance by an Actor in a Motion Picture	Best Performance by an Actress in a Motion Picture
Lee Marvin – Cat Ballou; Jack Lemmon – The Great Race; Laurence Olivier – Othello; Omar Sharif – Doctor Zhivago; Oskar Werner – Ship of Fools	Julie Andrews – The Sound of Music; Claire Bloom – The Spy Who Came in From The Cold; Julie Christie – Darling; Simone Signoret – Ship of Fools; Vivien Leigh – Ship of Fools
Best Director in a Motion Picture
Robert Wise – The Sound of Music; Robert Aldrich – The Flight of the Phoenix; David Lean – Doctor Zhivago; Sidney Lumet – The Hill; Mark Robson – Von Ryan's Express

=== Television ===
Best Edited Television Program	Outstanding Television Program of the Year
The Big Valley: "40 Rifles" – Sherman A. Rose; A Slice of Sunday – Harry Coswick; Rawhide: "Encounter at Boot Hill" – Gene Fowler Jr.; I Spy: "The Loser" – Bud Molin; Wagon Train: "Silver Lady" – Gene Palmer	Get Smart; The Big Valley; I Spy; The Man From U.N.C.L.E.; The Wild Wild West
Best Performance by an Actor in a Television Program	Best Performance by an Actress in a Television Program
Bill Cosby – I Spy: "The Loser"; Don Adams – Get Smart: "Aboard the Orient Express"; Peter Breck – The Big Valley: "Night of the Wolf"; Robert Conrad – The Wild Wild West: "The Night of the Howling Light"; Roy Thinnes – The Long, Hot Summer: "A Time of Living"	Barbara Stanwyck – The Big Valley: "Boots With My Father's Name"; Lucille Ball – The Lucy Show: "The Stuntman"; Eartha Kitt – I Spy: "The Loser"; Nancy Malone – The Long, Hot Summer: "Hiding Place"; Inger Stevens – The Farmer's Daughter: "The Have and to Hold"
Best Director of a Television Program
Virgil Vogel – Bonanza: "The Return"; David Alexander – My Favorite Martian: "Goest West Young Man"; Earl Bellamy – Gunsmoke: "Malachi"; Sutton Roley – Rawhide: "Encounter at BootHill"; Roy Thinnes – The Long, Hot Summer: "A Time of Living"
