= American Cinema Editors =

Association of film editors

- Abbreviation: ACE
- Formation: October 26, 1950; 76 years ago
- Founders: Warren Low and Jack Ogilvie
- Type: Professional Organization
- Purpose: Advancing the art and science of film editing.
- Headquarters: Hollywood, California
- Official language: English
- Key people: Kevin Tent - President
- Main organ: Board
- Website: americancinemaeditors.org

Founded in 1950, American Cinema Editors (ACE) is an honorary society of film editors who are voted in based on the qualities of professional achievements, their education of others, and their dedication to editing. Members use the post-nominal letters "ACE". The organization's "Eddie Awards" are routinely covered in trade magazines such as The Hollywood Reporter and Variety. The society is not an industry union, such as the I.A.T.S.E. (specifically the Motion Picture Editors Guild or MPEG), to which an editor might also belong. The current president of ACE is Kevin Tent, who was elected in 2020.

== Membership ==
Eligibility for active membership is based on the following:

- Nomination or win of an ACE Eddie award and/or
- Desire to be a member
- Sponsorship by at least two active members
- Minimum of 72 months' (6 years) editing experience on features and/or television
- Interview by the Membership Committee
- Approval by the Board of Directors
- Acceptance by the general membership

Members use the postnominal "ACE" as part of their signatures, as well as on motion picture credits. Until 2014, the acronym was separated by dots "A.C.E.", but this was dropped in order to conform with the more modern format used by other industry organizations, such as the American Society of Cinematographers. The society publishes its current membership on its website.

== Board of directors ==
As of March 2024, the board of directors consists of:

Officers

- Sabrina Plisco (President)
- Maysie Hoy (Vice president)
- Lillian Benson (Secretary)
- Michael Ornstein (Treasurer)
- Kevin Tent (ex-officio)

Board of directors

- Kate Amend
- Nena Erb
- Stephanie Filo
- Dana E. Glauberman
- Dorian Harris
- Nancy Richardson
- Stephen Rivkin
- Kate Sanford
- Terilyn A. Shropshire
- Scott Vickrey

Associate Board

- Anita Brandt Burgoyne
- Jacques Gravett
- Susan Vaill
- John Venzon

== Eddie Awards ==
American Cinema Editors Eddie Awards
- Current: American Cinema Editors Awards 2026
- Eddies statuette, introduced in 1965
- Awarded for: Excellence in film editing
- Country: United States
- Presented by: American Cinema Editors
- First award: March 14, 1951; 75 years ago
- Website: americancinemaeditors.org/eddie-awards/

Beginning on March 14, 1951, the ACE held an annual dinner to honor the film editing Academy Award nominees - and the award was dubbed the Academy Nominees Awards Dinner for its first eleven years. When the National Academy of Television Arts and Sciences (NATAS) created a film editing category, the ACE invited them to the dinner as well. The first dinner was hosted by filmmaker George Murphy while Frank Capra handed the awards. The first dinner also included over two hundred guests - including film editors, stars, and producers.

Since the 12th American Cinema Editors Awards in 1962, the ACE began giving its own awards and renamed the event to American Cinema Editors Awards Dinner. In addition to handing out awards to film editors, they also began handing awards to television editors. The "Eddies" name and the statuette were introduced at the 15th American Cinema Editors Awards in 1965. The awards and nominations are typically covered in entertainment industry newspapers and journals such as Variety and The Hollywood Reporter.

As of 2024, the ACE presents 16 categories for film and television alongside special ones, these have gone through several name changes to make distinctions between genre, running time and commercial/non-commercial television productions depending on the category. The list below shows the categories under their current names respectively.

=== Current Awards ===
==== Film ====
- Best Edited Animated Feature Film (2009–present)
- Best Edited Feature Film – Comedy or Musical (1999–present)
- Best Edited Feature Film – Dramatic (1961–present)
- Best Edited Documentary – Feature (1972–present)

==== Television ====
- Best Edited Single-Camera Comedy Series (2021–present)
- Best Edited Multi-Camera Comedy Series (2021–present)
- Best Edited Drama Series (1962–2004; 2021–present)
- Best Edited Documentary – (Non-Theatrical) (2012–present)
- Best Edited Miniseries or Motion Picture for Television (1972–present)
- Best Edited Non-Scripted Series (2007–present)
- Best Edited Variety Talk/Sketch Show or Special (2020–present)
- Best Edited Animation (Non-Theatrical) (2020–present)

==== Special awards ====
- The ACE Student Editing Competition winner
- Career Achievement Awards (1988–present)
- The ACE Golden Eddie Filmmaker of the Year Award (1967–present)

=== Former Awards ===
==== Film ====
- Best Edited Special (1962–1964)
- Best Performance by an Actor in a Film Debut (1965)
- Best Performance by an Actress in a Film Debut (1965)
- Outstanding Picture of the Year (1965–1966)
- Best Director in a Motion Picture (1966)
- Best Performance by an Actor in a Motion Picture (1966)
- Best Performance by an Actress in a Motion Picture (1966)

==== Television ====
- Best Director in a Television Program (1966)
- Best Performance by an Actor in a Television Program (1966)
- Best Performance by an Actress in a Television Program (1966)
- Outstanding Television Program of the Year (1966)
- Best Edited Half-Hour Series for Television (1992–2016)
- Best Edited Comedy Series for Commercial Television (2017–2020)
- Best Edited Comedy Series for Non-Commercial Television (2017–2020)
- Best Edited Drama Series for Commercial Television (2005–2020)
- Best Edited Drama Series for Non-Commercial Television (2005–2020)

== Magazine ==
Since 1951, the ACE has published the quarterly magazine CinemaEditor. It began as an in-house publication, but grew to 5,000 subscribers in 1963. In the early 1990s the magazine collapsed into a four-page newsletter. In 1994, Jack Tucker was appointed as editor and transformed the publication into today's magazine. Walter Fernandez Jr. leads the magazine's team, with publications committee chair Edgar Burcksen.

== ACE Student Editing Competition ==
The American Cinema Editors also holds an annual student competition, awarding one student editor for editing a set of video dailies for a dramatic scene. Three finalists are guests at the annual ACE Eddie Awards in February. Applications are accepted through October and cost US$125. The competition is limited to the first 100 students only.

== Editing exercises ==
The ACE Store is the source of the dailies used at most film schools today, primarily for editing exercises. One scene that many film students must edit is from "Buffalo Man," a 1958 episode of the TV series Gunsmoke. The educational film with this footage is called Film Editing: Interpretation and Value, and is available only to instructors of film editing classes, though it can be found online as well. The film includes three different edits of the Gunsmoke scene, as well as the scene's original dailies. Another film, "Basic Principles of Film Editing", was produced by Leon Barsha. Using clips from the movie, Baby Face Nelson, the film demonstrates how the use of various angles would enhance the film's story.
