= Hotel Sahara =

1951 British comedy film

- US film poster
- Directed by: Ken Annakin
- Screenplay by: George Hambley Brown /Patrick Kirwan
- Produced by: George Hambley Brown
- Starring: Yvonne De Carlo; Peter Ustinov; David Tomlinson; Roland Culver; Albert Lieven
- Cinematography: David Harcourt; Jack Hildyard
- Edited by: Alfred Roome
- Music by: Benjamin Frankel
- Production company: Tower Films
- Distributed by: General Film Distributors
- Release date: 9 July 1951
- Running time: 96 minutes
- Country: United Kingdom
- Language: English

Hotel Sahara is a 1951 British war comedy film directed by Ken Annakin and starring Yvonne De Carlo, Peter Ustinov and David Tomlinson. It was produced and co-written by George Hambley Brown.

== Plot ==
The Hotel Sahara, situated in a desert oasis, quickly empties when the patrons learn that the Italian Army has commenced hostilities in the North African campaign. Emad, the hotel's owner, also wants to flee, but is persuaded by his fiancee, Yasmin Pallas, to stay and try to save the hotel, all he owns. The other two members of the staff also stay: Yasmin's mother, Madame Pallas, and Yusef, the major domo.

The Italians take over the hotel, and Capitano Alberto Giuseppi Del Nobile is soon captivated by Yasmin's charms. His orderly is attracted to Madame Pallas. Later, however, the main Italian Army suffers a defeat, and Del Nobile's small detachment is ordered to retreat, destroying any structures that may aid the enemy – which will include the hotel. Emad sabotages their truck to delay them, giving him the chance to disconnect their demolition charges just in time to save the hotel, as Yusef fires into the air to speed the Italians on their way.

Next to arrive are the British. Major Bill Randall and Captain Edgar "Puffin" Cheyne both vie for Yasmin's attention, while Madame Pallas flirts with the enlisted men. Randall's assignment is to recruit the Arabs to work for the British. Emad informs Randall that they prefer goods, rather than money, so he sends Cheyne and Private Binns to requisition supplies. He also orders a dozen nylons, on his own account. When they return, Cheyne lies about not being able to find any, having kept them for himself as a gift for Yasmin. When Randall finds out, he sends Cheyne with Emad who has agreed to attend a conference with the local Arabs, if only to get the British to leave.

While they are gone, Randall swims in the hotel pool with Yasmin. When about a dozen Germans drive up, the outnumbered British have to hastily leave, with Randall still in his swim trunks. Lieutenant Gunther von Heilicke requisitions the hotel, but is (initially) immune to Yasmin's charms. He sets off Randall's booby trap, but emerges unscathed. Emad and Cheyne return to the hotel on camels, accompanied by the Arabs. Cheyne is in Arab dress. Heilicke has the Arabs stay for a feast, then insists on being introduced to the sheiks. Before he gets to Cheyne, Yasmin provides a distraction, dressing up in the departed Fatima's costume and performing a belly dance, as Emad leads Cheyne away to make his escape on a camel.

The Germans in turn depart after they sight a large column approaching. This time, it is the French. The Germans and the British are both still lurking a short distance away in the desert. Then both the German lieutenant and the British major come up with the same idea, to disguise themselves as Arabs (with Cheyne as a veiled woman) and reconnoiter, but by the time they arrive, the French have already moved on. The radio brings the news that the war in North Africa is nearly over, but when the three men discover each other, they start shooting. After running out of bullets, Heilicke flees, chased by the other two. As Emad and Yasmin start to celebrate having the hotel back to themselves, they hear an American voice.

== Cast ==
- Yvonne De Carlo as Yasmin Pallas
- Peter Ustinov as Emad
- David Tomlinson as Captain Edgar "Puffin" Cheyne
- Roland Culver as Major Bill Randall
- Albert Lieven as Leutnant Gunther von Heilicke
- Bill Owen as Private Binns
- Guido Lorraine as Capitano Alberto Giuseppi Del Nobile
- Mireille Perrey as Madame Pallas
- Ferdy Mayne as Yusef
- Sydney Tafler as Corporal Pullar
- Eugene Deckers as French Spahi Officer
- Anton Diffring as a German Soldier
- Olga Lowe as Fatima

== Production ==
=== Development ===
Hotel Sahara was the first film from Tower Films, the new production company of producer George Brown. Ken Annakin called Brown "very active and creative." The film was based on an idea of Brown's. He had a chat in a Fleet Street pub about a hotel in the Western Desert Campaign which kept changing sides, and he arranged for a script to be written. It took him five months to secure a distribution guarantee, sell the idea to the National Film Finance Corporation to get some finance, fix studio space and facilities, raise private finance to complete funding, and to secure the star he wanted, Yvonne De Carlo, from Hollywood.

Brown eventually got De Carlo by writing her and saying that he observed that she had a flair to play comedy. De Carlo was keen for a change of pace. She later wrote that her role "did not entirely break my Hollywood stereotype" but "this time it was satire and that made all the difference." Brown knew Peter Ustinov from their time together in the RAF Film Unit during World War II. After the war, the two co-produced School for Secrets and Vice Versa.

=== Filming ===
De Carlo arrived in London in December 1950 and filming started in January 1951. It was shot at Pinewood Studios with sets designed by the art director Ralph W. Brinton. There was also some location filming in Egypt. She later said "the production couldn't have run more smoothly and Peter was a delight to work with." During filming, Ustinov met Suzanne Cloutier who became his wife.

Ken Annakin said shooting was "a most precarious operation" because the three leads worked in different ways: Ustinov liked to do only a few rehearsals and one or two takes, De Carlo required "at least seven full rehearsals", while David Tomlinson "had the worst habits of London theatre actors. He loved to upstage and upset other actors' performances." However Annakin said "I revelled in it."

De Carlo sang the songs, "I Love a Man" and "Say Goodbye". It was the first time she had sung on film. The scene of Yasmin Pallas (De Carlo) dancing had to be censored for the US cut of the film.

== Reception ==
The film was popular in England. According to Annakin the film "was a big success, especially in Germany, because it was the first time since the war that German soldiers had been portrayed as normal human beings."

De Carlo wanted to make more films with Brown and Ustinov, including one about a matador, but it did not happen.

== Soundtrack ==
- "I Love a Man", music by Benjamin Frankel (as Ben Bernard), lyrics by Harold Purcell, sung by Yvonne De Carlo
- "Say Goodbye, Soldier Boy", music by Benjamin Frankel (as Ben Bernard), lyrics by Harold Purcell, sung by Yvonne De Carlo
- "Early One Morning", traditional, sung by Yvonne De Carlo
- The Neapolitan art song "Funiculì, Funiculà" provides the leitmotif for the Italians, "Liliburlero" for the English detachment, and Richard Wagner's "Ride of the Valkyries" for the Germans.
