= American Cinema Editors Awards 1962 =

12th ACE Awards
- Presented by: American Cinema Editors
- Date: February 21, 1962
- Site: The Beverly Hills Hotel, Beverly Hills, California
- Hosted by: Louis Nye

Highlights
- Best Film: The Parent Trap

The 12th American Cinema Editors Awards, which were presented on Wednesday, February 21, 1962, at The Beverly Hills Hotel, honored the best editors in films and television. The layout of the awards were announced on September 18, 1961. The ACE Second Decade Anniversary Book writes "Henceforth A.C.E. sponsored its own editing awards." This was the first ceremony that handed out unique awards; the previous ceremonies celebrated the editors who were nominated Academy Awards. The award was hosted by comedian Louis Nye.

== Nominees ==
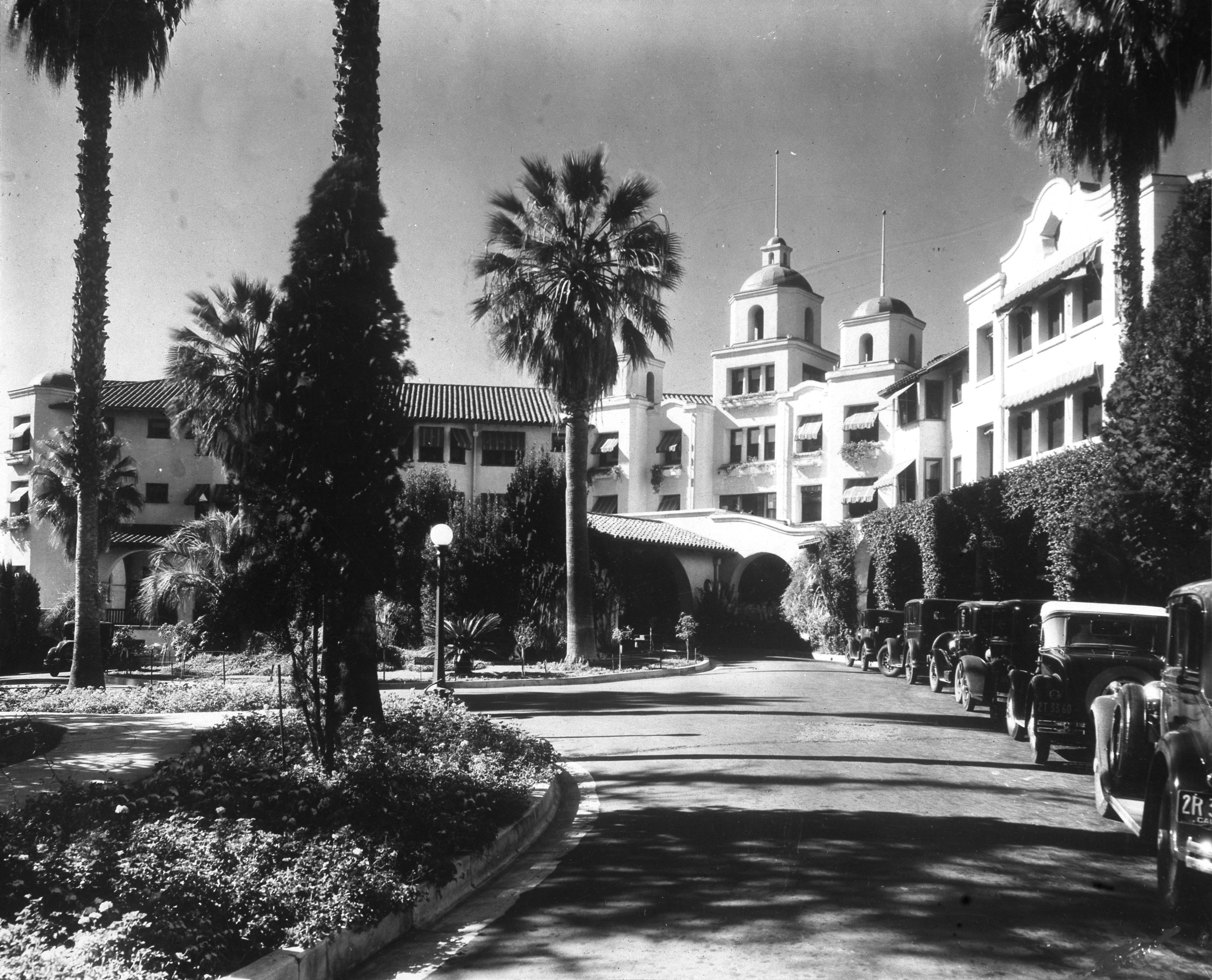
The Beverly Hills Hotel in 1925, the site of the award ceremony.

Best Edited Feature Film	Best Edited Television Program
The Parent Trap – Philip W. Anderson; Fanny – William H. Reynolds; The Hustler – Dede Allen; Judgment at Nuremberg – Frederic Knudtson; Pocketful of Miracles – Frank P. Keller	The Dick Powell Show: "Ricochet" – Desmond Marquette; Bus Stop: "A Lion Walks Among Us" – Richard L. Van Enger; The Gertrude Berg Show: "Lonely Sunday" – Chandler House; Thriller: "A Third for Pinochle" – Danny B. Landres; The Twilight Zone: "Once Upon a Time" – Jason H. Bernie
Best Edited Special (Documentary)
Nikki: Wild Dog of the North – Grant K. Smith; Walt Disney's Wonderful World of Color: "Chico, the Misunderstood Coyote" – Lloyd L. Richardson; Walt Disney's Wonderful World of Color: "A Fire Called Jeremiah" – Norman R. Palmer
