= Sleeping Car to Trieste =

- Directed by: John Paddy Carstairs
- Written by: Allan MacKinnon
- Story by: Clifford Grey
- Produced by: George H. Brown
- Starring: Jean Kent; Albert Lieven; Derrick De Marney; Paul Dupuis; Rona Anderson; David Tomlinson
- Cinematography: Jack Hildyard
- Edited by: Sidney Stone
- Music by: Benjamin Frankel
- Production company: Two Cities Films
- Distributed by: General Film Distributors; Eagle-Lion Films (US)
- Release date: 6 October 1948
- Running time: 95 minutes
- Country: United Kingdom
- Language: English

Sleeping Car to Trieste is a 1948 British comedy thriller film directed by John Paddy Carstairs and starring Jean Kent, Albert Lieven, Derrick De Marney and Rona Anderson. It was written by Allan MacKinnon and is a remake of the 1932 film Rome Express.

== Plot ==
Zurta and Valya are at ease in sophisticated society. Zurta steals a diary from the safe of an embassy in Paris while they are guests at a reception there, killing a servant who walks in on the theft. Poole, an accomplice, is passed the diary, but double-crosses them and attempts to flee with it on the Orient Express traveling between Paris and Trieste. Just in time, Valya and Zurta board the train, on which compartments are scarce, leading to unintended consequences.

They start looking for Poole, who seeks to conceal himself and the diary, which is said to be capable of kindling a new conflict in the aftermath of World War II. Other travelers on the train, some of whom become involved incidentally in the intrigue, include a US Army sergeant with an eye for the ladies, an adulterous couple, a pestering stockbroker, an arrogant and wealthy writer, his brow-beaten secretary, an ornithologist, and a famed French police inspector. Staff and other passengers provide light-hearted scenes. The diary passes through the hands of several people before the police investigate Poole’s mysterious death. Just when it is successfully completed, Zurta takes it at gunpoint and leaps from the train…not safely onto the tracks but unknowingly immediately in front of a passing express.

== Cast ==
- Jean Kent as Valya
- Albert Lieven as Zurta
- Derrick De Marney as George Grant
- Paul Dupuis as Inspector Jolif
- Rona Anderson as Joan Maxted
- David Tomlinson as Tom Bishop
- Bonar Colleano as Sergeant West
- Finlay Currie as Alastair MacBain
- Grégoire Aslan as Poirier, the chef (as Coco Aslan)
- Alan Wheatley as Karl/Charles Poole
- Hugh Burden as Mills
- David Hutcheson as Denning
- Claude Larue as Andrée
- Zena Marshall as Suzanne
- Leslie Weston as Randall
- Michael Ward as Elvin
- Eugene Deckers as Jules
- Dino Galvani as Pierre
- George De Warfaz as Chef du Train
- Gerard Heinz as Ambassador

== Production ==
In October 1947 it was announced Two Cities would film a remake of Rome Express.

The film was originally known as Sleeping Car to Vienna. It was shot at Denham Studios outside London with sets were designed by the art director Ralph Brinton.

Rona Anderson made her film debut. "I did enjoy doing it", said Anderson. "It was a film full of nice little cameo performances ... Paddy Carstairs had a good way of relaxing you and I think he had a very good way with actors generally."

It was the one movie Albert Lieven made while under contract to Rank for five years.

Jean Kent later stated she "didn't like" the film "and didn't get on very well" with Carstairs. "You never knew where you were with him ... I don't remember enjoying it. I had silly clothes. I wanted to be very French in plain black and a little beret but I had to wear these silly New Look clothes. I was playing a superspy of some kind. But who was I spying for?"

== Release ==
The film proved more popular in the US than most British films, enjoying a long run in New York.

== Reception ==
The Monthly Film Bulletin wrote: "'This is a film which has put to use and made the most of a holding story, although many scenes and characters are irrelevant. The difficult characters call for some competent acting which is generally fulfilled. David Tomlinson is an excellent bore, and Alan Wheatley plays the part of the terrified man on the run well. The humour is adequate, the suspense and climax are good. This is good entertainment, but perhaps not for those who have previously seen Rome Express."

In The Radio Times Guide to Films David Parkinson gave the film 2/5 stars, writing: "While 1932's Rome Express was a sleek, fast-moving turbo of a crime drama, this unnecessary remake is something of a branch-line diesel that director John Paddy Carstairs insists on stopping at every country halt. ... Comparisons are inevitable, if slightly unfair, but none of the cast improves on the original characterisations."

The New York Times wrote, "not without its trying moments, but on the whole it is a mighty interesting ride ...The director John Paddy Carstairs shrewdly maneuvers the pursuers and the hunted about the train in a natural and credible manner so that the possibility of an imminent meeting creates a good deal of tension...None of the principals is too familiar to audiences here, and at times dialogue is lost in some of the players' throats, but the performances are generally satisfying."
