= Edgar Burcksen =

Dutch film editor (1947–2024)

- Born: 13 May 1947; Apeldoorn, Netherlands
- Died: 7 April 2024 (aged 76); Los Angeles, California, U.S.
- Occupation: Film editor

Edgar Burcksen (13 May 1947 – 7 April 2024) was a Dutch film editor, who moved to the United States in 1985 after editing over 15 films in the Netherlands. He was a member of the American Cinema Editors and was fluent in English, German, French and Dutch.

== History ==
After a successful career as a film editor in the Netherlands, he settled in California, where he became the supervising editor for 52 episodes of Seabert, a French cartoon that later became televised by HBO. Afterwards, Burcksen was hired by Colossal Pictures where he collaborated editorially on many commercials, including those for Disney, Budweiser, and Levi's.

Burcksen was hired by Industrial Light & Magic in 1989 to become the visual effects editor on The Hunt for Red October. Based on his success, he was later assigned to post-production on Die Hard 2. Afterwards, Burcksen oversaw editing on The Young Indiana Jones Chronicles. His work with George Lucas on the series earned him an Emmy for best editing in 1992.

After the series, he became the editor and post-production supervisor on 500 Nations and Star Command. In 1996, he was signed up to edit Colors Straight Up, which was later nominated for best feature-length documentary at the Oscars the following year. His collaboration with director Jeroen Krabbé on the feature Left Luggage received four prestigious awards at the Berlin Film Festival in 1998.

Burcksen was elected as a member of the American Cinema Editors, and was a member of its board of directors. From 2001 to 2010, Edgar Burcksen was editor-in-chief of CinemaEditor—the official magazine of the ACE.

In February 2011, the American Cinema Editors honored Burcksen with the Robert Wise Award for his tireless efforts to highlight the post-production process of film and television projects in his role as editor-in-chief of CINEMAEDITOR.

== Personal life and death ==
Burcksen was an accomplished ultramarathon cyclist, having completed 25 double centuries. He died from complications of a heart attack on 7 April 2024, at the age of 76.
