= David Tomlinson =

English actor (1917–2000)

- Born: David Cecil MacAlister Tomlinson; 7 May 1917; Henley-on-Thames, Oxfordshire, England
- Died: 24 June 2000 (aged 83); Westminster, London, England
- Occupations: Actor; singer; comedian
- Years active: 1940–1980
- Spouses: Mary Lindsay Hiddingh (m. 1943; died 1943) Audrey Freeman (m. 1953)
- Children: 4
- Military career
- Allegiance: United Kingdom
- Branch: Royal Air Force
- Service years: 1940–1945
- Rank: Flight Lieutenant
- Units: Film Unit
- Conflicts: Second World War

David Cecil MacAlister Tomlinson (7 May 1917 – 24 June 2000) was an English stage, film and television actor, singer and comedian. Having been described as both a leading actor and a character actor, he is primarily remembered for his roles with The Walt Disney Company as the patriarch father George Banks in Mary Poppins (1964), hapless antagonist Peter Thorndyke in The Love Bug (1968) and the friendly con man Professor Emelius Browne in Bedknobs and Broomsticks (1971). Tomlinson was posthumously inducted as a Disney Legend in 2002.

== Early life ==
David Cecil MacAlister Tomlinson was born on 7 May 1917 in Henley-on-Thames, Oxfordshire, the son of Clarence Samuel Tomlinson (1883–1978), a well-respected London solicitor, and Florence Elizabeth, née Sinclair-Thomson (1890–1986). He attended Tonbridge School and left to join the Grenadier Guards for 16 months. His father then secured him a job as a clerk at Shell Mex House.

His stage career grew from amateur stage productions to his 1940 film debut in Quiet Wedding. His career was interrupted when he entered Second World War service as a Flight Lieutenant in the RAF. During the war, he learned to fly in Canada and was assigned as a flying instructor in the UK, while also appearing in three more films. He continued flying after the war. On one occasion, a Tiger Moth plane he was piloting crashed into woodland near his back garden after he lost consciousness while performing aerobatics.

== Film career ==
Tomlinson played Philip Rowe, one of the three British airmen escaping from a German POW camp, in the 1950 British film The Wooden Horse.

Tomlinson played the role of George Banks, head of the Banks family, in the Disney film Mary Poppins (1964). Tomlinson continued work with Disney, appearing in The Love Bug (1968) and Bedknobs and Broomsticks (1971). Throughout the rest of Tomlinson's film career, he never steered far from comedies. His final acting appearance was in The Fiendish Plot of Dr. Fu Manchu (1980), which was also the final film of Peter Sellers. Tomlinson retired from acting at age 63 to spend more time with his family. However, in 1992, at the age of 75, he appeared on the Wogan talk show along with Tommy Cockles.

== Accolades ==
- 7th Grammy Awards - Winner - Best Recording for Children ( Julie Andrews, Dick Van Dyke with David Tomlinson, Glynis Johns, Ed Wynn - Mary Poppins)
- 15th Eddie Awards - Winner - Best Performance by an Actor in a Film Debut
- Disney Legends Award - 2002

== Personal life and death ==
Tomlinson was first married to Mary Lindsay Hiddingh, daughter of L. Seton Lindsay, the vice president of the New York Life Insurance Company. She had been widowed in 1941 when her husband, Major Armand Guy Hiddingh, was killed in action, leaving her to care for their two young sons. Tomlinson married Mary in New York in September 1943, but on 2 December 1943, she killed herself and her two sons in a murder–suicide by jumping from a hotel in New York City, after learning that she could not take her two sons with her to join Tomlinson in England until WWII ended.

Tomlinson's second wife was actress Audrey Freeman (born 12 November 1931), whom he married on 17 May 1953, and the couple remained together for 47 years until his death. They had four sons.

Owing to the autism diagnosis of his third son, Willie, Tomlinson campaigned for early awareness of autism in the UK, using his connections to gain the help of friends in showbusiness, and raising a record amount of money from a television appeal, in the 1970s. He and his wife Audrey, among others, helped to found Somerset Court, the first residential home in Europe dedicated to adults with autism.

Tomlinson died peacefully in his sleep at King Edward VII's Hospital, Westminster, at 4 a.m. on 24 June 2000, after suffering a stroke. He was 83 years old. He was interred at his estate grounds in Mursley, Buckinghamshire. Tomlinson had joked that he wanted "actor of genius, irresistible to women" as an epitaph.

== Filmography ==
Film performances
Year	Title	Role	Notes
1940	Garrison Follies		Uncredited
1941	Quiet Wedding	John Royd	
1941	My Wife's Family	Willie Bagshott	
1941	"Pimpernel" Smith	Steve	
1945	The Way to the Stars	Prune' Parsons	
1945	Journey Together	Smith	
1946	I See a Dark Stranger	Intelligence Officer	
1946	School for Secrets	Mr. Watlington	
1947	Fame Is the Spur	Lord Liskeard	
1947	Master of Bankdam	Lancelot Handel Crowther	
1948	Easy Money	Martin Latham	
1948	Miranda	Charles	
1948	Broken Journey	Jimmy Marshall	
1948	My Brother's Keeper	Ronnie Waring	
1948	Sleeping Car to Trieste	Tom Bishop	
1948	Love in Waiting	Robert Clitheroe	
1948	Here Come the Huggetts	Harold Hinchley	
1949	Warning to Wantons	Count Max Kardak	
1949	Vote for Huggett	Harold Hinchley	
1949	Marry Me!	David Haig	
1949	Helter Skelter	Nick Martin	
1949	The Chiltern Hundreds	Lord Tony Pym	
1949	Landfall	Binks	
1950	So Long at the Fair	Johnny Barton	
1950	The Wooden Horse	Philip Rowe	
1951	Calling Bulldog Drummond	Algernon 'Algy' Longworth	
1951	Hotel Sahara	Captain Puffin Cheyne	
1951	The Magic Box	Assistant in Laboratory	
1952	Castle in the Air	Earl of Locharne	
1952	Made in Heaven	Basil Topham	
1953	Is Your Honeymoon Really Necessary?	Frank Betteron	
1955	All for Mary	Humphrey 'Humpy' Miller	
1956	Three Men in a Boat	Jerome	
1957	Carry On Admiral	Tom Baker	
1958	Up the Creek	Lt. Humphrey Fairweather	
1958	Further Up the Creek	Lt. Humphrey Fairweather	
1960	Follow That Horse!	Dick Lanchester	
1960	Sink the Bismarck!	Uncredited	
1963	Tom Jones	Lord Fellamar	
1964	Mary Poppins	George Banks	
1964	The Truth About Spring	Charles Skelton	
1965	City Under the Sea	Harold Tufnell-Jones	
1965	The Liquidator	Quadrant	
1968	The Love Bug	Peter Thorndyke	
1971	Bedknobs and Broomsticks	Professor Emelius Browne	
1975	From Hong Kong with Love	Sir John MacGregor	
1977	Wombling Free	Roland Frogmorton	
1978	The Water Babies	Sir John / Polar Bear	Voice role
1979	Dominique	Lawyer	
1980	The Fiendish Plot of Dr. Fu Manchu	Sir Roger Avery	

Television performances
Year	Title	Role	Notes
1954	The Birdcage Room	Lord Tempest	Television film
1954	All for Mary	Clive Norton	Outside Broadcast of the theatre production
1955	Theatre Royal	Tom Pettigo	Episode: "The No Man"
1957	Theatre Night	David Warren	Episode: "Dear Delinquent"
1960	ITV Play of the Week	Tom Swinley	Episode: "The Happy Man"
1967	Comedy Playhouse	Charles Pinfold	Episode: "Loitering With Intent"
1976	Hawaii Five-O	Blake	Episode: "Nine Dragons"

== See also ==
- The Life I Lead, a 2019 one-man comedy play by James Kettle which explores Tomlinson's life, starring Miles Jupp.
