= American Cinema Editors Awards 1964 =

14th ACE Awards
- Presented by: American Cinema Editors
- Date: March 21, 1964
- Site: Beverly Wilshire Hotel, Beverly Hills, California
- Hosted by: Irene Ryan

Highlights
- Best Film: The Longest Day

The 14th American Cinema Editors Awards, which were presented on Saturday, March 21, 1964, at the Beverly Wilshire Hotel, honored the best editors in films and television. The award was hosted by actress and comedian Irene Ryan while the principal speaker was NBC president Pat Weaver.

== Nominees ==
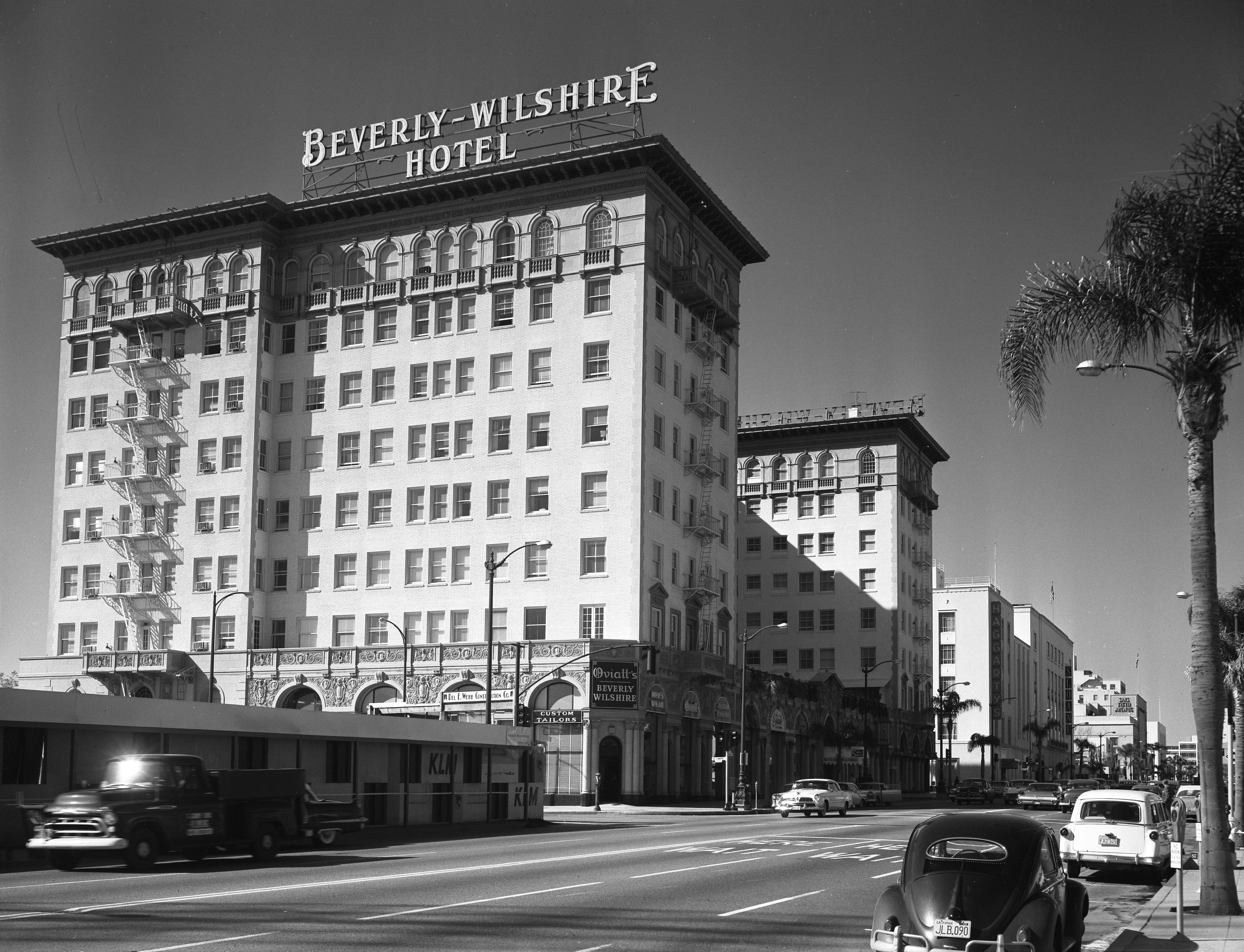
The Beverly Wilshire Hotel in 1959

Best Edited Feature Film	Best Edited Television Program
How the West Was Won – Harold F. Kress; Cleopatra – Dorothy Spencer; Hud – Frank Bracht; It's a Mad, Mad, Mad, Mad World – Frederic Knudtson, Robert C. Jones, and Gene Fowler Jr.; Tom Jones – Antony Gibbs	Dr. Kildare: "Four Feet in the Morning – Part 1" – Harry V. Knapp; The Eleventh Hour: "Four Feet in the Morning – Part 2" – Joseph Dervin; Bonanza: "Hoss and the Leprechauns" – Marvin Coil; Breaking Point: "And James Was a Very Small Snail" – William Mace; The Richard Boone Show: "The Wall to Wall War" – Jason H. Bernie
Best Edited Special
The Making of the President 1960 – William Cartwright; Yellowstone Cubs – George Gale
