= Tea for Two (TV series) =

- Genre: Music television
- Presented by: Jocelyn Terry; Guido Lorraine
- Country of origin: Australia
- Original language: English

Production
- Running time: 15 minutes

Original release
- Network: HSV-7
- Release: 1 March – 2 August 1960

Tea for Two was a short-lived Australian television series, which aired on Melbourne television station HSV-7 on Tuesdays from 1 March to 2 August 1960. The series was a music programme with Jocelyn Terry and singer Guido Lorraine. Each episode was aired in a 15-minute daytime time-slot.

Following the end of this series, Jocelyn Terry (who had previously worked at ABV-2) began work on another HSV-7 series on Tuesdays called On Your Behalf, an informational series with Brian Naylor. It is not known if any kinescopes or video-tapes remain of either series today, given the wiping of the era.
