= CinemaEditor =

American magazine

- 2024 first-quarter issue about the Eddie Awards
- Editor: Edgar Burcksen
- Frequency: Quarterly
- Publisher: American Cinema Editors, Inc.
- Founded: November 28, 1950
- Country: US
- Based in: Universal City, California
- Website: editfestglobal.com/cinemaeditor-magazine-3rd-qrtr-2024/
- ISSN: 0044-7625
- OCLC: 801242314

CinemaEditor Magazine is a quarterly magazine published by American Cinema Editors (ACE) established on November 28, 1950. It began in 1951 as an in-house publication titled The Cinemeditor. It grew to 5,000 subscribers in 1963. In Fall 1971, the title changed to American Cinemeditor. After a two-year suspension, in 1993 it became a monthly newsletter titled Cinemeditor. The publication returned to a magazine format in 1995. In Winter 2001 the title became CinemaEditor.

Edgar Burcksen lead the magazine's team with Associate Editor Vincent LoBrutto until his death in 2024.
