= Guido Lorraine =

Australian actor and musician (1912–2009)

- Born: Gwidon Alfred Gottlieb; 2 September 1912; Kraków, Galicia, Austrian Poland
- Died: 31 December 2009 (aged 97); Melbourne, Victoria, Australia
- Other names: Gwidon Borucki; Guy Borucki
- Occupations: Actor, singer, musician

Guido Lorraine (2 September 1912 – 31 December 2009) was a Polish-born actor, musician and singer, known primarily for his roles in war films. He was also sometimes known by the stage name Guy Borucki. Lorraine appeared in twenty-eight films during his career, as well as many theatre productions.

Lorraine was born Gwidon Alfred Gottlieb in present-day Kraków, Poland in 1912. He studied at the School of Foreign Trade in Lwów (Lviv), where he sang in restaurants to earn money. He learned to play the accordion and piano as a child.

Lorraine founded a military theatre group during World War II. He is credited as the first singer to perform the song, "Red Poppy Flowers of Monte Cassino", in public.

He adopted the pseudonym Guy Borucki after World War II and moved to London. He appeared on BBC radio, television and film. His film credits during the era included Hotel Sahara in 1951, 1955's The Colditz Story and Blue Murder at St Trinian's in 1957. He also starred in a number of musical comedies and other British productions during the 1950s.

He arrived in Australia in 1959 with the performance of a musical operetta Grab Me a Gondola in which he had the main role, and made his home in Melbourne to pursue his acting career. Much of his career centred on entertainment for the Polish community living in Australia, including a series of theatre performances, revues and cabarets. He also starred in his own television show in 1960 called Tea for Two, a musical programme on Melbourne station HSV-7.

Guido Lorraine died in Melbourne, Australia, on 31 December 2009, at the age of 97.

== Filmography ==
Year	Title	Role	Notes
1949	The Passionate Friends	Hotel Manager	
1950	State Secret	Lieutenant Prachi	
1950	Tony Draws a Horse	Accordion Player	Uncredited
1951	Hotel Sahara	Captain Giuseppi	
1951	Encore	Russian Prince	(segment "Gigolo and Gigolette")
1952	Top Secret	1st M.V.D.	
1953	The Village	Mr. Karginski	
1953	Sailor of the King	German Officer	Uncredited
1953	The Red Beret	German Officer	
1954	Father Brown	Cafe Patron	
1955	The Colditz Story	Polish Officer #1	
1955	Break in the Circle	Franz	
1955	Above Us the Waves	Officer Interpreter	
1955	Value for Money	Head Waiter	Uncredited
1955	They Can't Hang Me	Pietr Revski	
1955	Gentlemen Marry Brunettes	M. Marcel	
1955	Alias John Preston	Headwaiter	
1956	Port Afrique	Abdul	
1956	Loser Takes All	Room Waiter	Uncredited
1957	Ill Met by Moonlight	German Officer	Uncredited
1957	That Woman Opposite	Goron	
1957	Blue Murder at St Trinian's	Prince Bruno	
1959	The Great Van Robbery	Leprave	(final film role)
