= David Hutcheson =

British actor (1905–1976)

- in The Abominable Dr. Phibes (1971)
- Born: 14 June 1905; Craigmore, Bute, Scotland
- Died: 18 February 1976 (aged 70); Berkshire, England
- Occupation: Actor
- Years active: 1930–1973
- Spouse: Countess of Warwick

David Hutcheson (14 June 1905 – 18 February 1976) was a British character actor. He made his film debut in Fast and Loose in 1930 and played his only lead role in 1934's Romance in Rhythm. He went on to specialise in hooray henrys, silly asses and military types most prominently in Michael Powell and Emeric Pressburger's The Life and Death of Colonel Blimp (1943) and Peter Ustinov's School for Secrets (1946) and Vice Versa (1948). He continued in film and television until the 1970s. During the 1960s he often played the role of Colonel Pickering in stage productions of My Fair Lady.

On 25 March 1949 he married Mary, Countess of Warwick, (née Mary Kathleen Hopkinson), the former wife of Charles Greville, 7th Earl of Warwick. This was shortly after the Earl of Warwick divorced his wife because of her adultery with Hutcheson.

== Selected filmography ==
- Fast and Loose (1930) - Lord Rockingham
- Romance in Rhythm (1934) - Bob Mervyn
- The Love Test (1935) - Thompson
- Wedding Group (1936) - George Harkness
- This'll Make You Whistle (1936) - Archie Codrington
- The Sky's the Limit (1938) - Teddy Carson
- A Gentleman's Gentleman (1939) - Bassy
- Lucky to Me (1939) - Peter Malden
- She Couldn't Say No (1940) - Peter Thurston
- The Middle Watch (1940) - Cmdr. Baddeley
- Convoy (1940) - Captain Sandeman
- Bulldog Sees It Through (1940) - Freddie Caryll
- The Next of Kin (1942) - Intelligence officer
- Sabotage at Sea (1942) - Capt. Richard Tracey
- The Life and Death of Colonel Blimp (1943) - Hoppy
- Theatre Royal (1943) - Harry (uncredited)
- The Hundred Pound Window (1944) - Steve Halligan
- The Way Ahead (1944) - Garage Customer in Car (uncredited)
- The Trojan Brothers (1946) - Cyril Todd
- School for Secrets (1946) - Squadron Leader Sowerby
- Vice Versa (1948) - Marmaduke Paradine
- Sleeping Car to Trieste (1948) - Denning
- Woman Hater (1948) - Robert
- The Small Back Room (1949) - Norval
- Madness of the Heart (1949) - Max Ffoliott
- My Daughter Joy (1950) - Annix
- The Fighting Pimpernel (1950) - Lord Anthony Dewhurst
- Circle of Danger (1951) - Tony Wrexham
- No Highway in the Sky (1951) - Penworthy, Test Pilot (uncredited)
- Encore (1951) - Sandy Wescott (segment "Gigolo and Gigolette")
- Something Money Can't Buy (1952) - Buster
- The Big Money (1956) - Tipster at Racecourse (uncredited)
- The Birthday Present (1957) - Ex. R.A.F. Type
- Law and Disorder (1958) - Freddie Cooper
- The Evil of Frankenstein (1964) - Burgomaster
- The Amorous Adventures of Moll Flanders (1965) - Doctor
- Triple Cross (1966) - Ministry Official
- The Magic Christian (1969) - Lord Barry
- Every Home Should Have One (1970) - Stockbroker
- The Abominable Dr. Phibes (1971) - Dr. Hedgepath
- Public Eye (1971, TV Series) - Sir Roger L'Ettrell
- Follow Me! (1972) - Dinner Guest (uncredited)
- The National Health (1973) - Mackie
