= Rooney (film) =

- Directed by: George Pollock
- Screenplay by: Patrick Kirwan
- Based on: novel Rooney by Catherine Cookson
- Produced by: George H. Brown
- Starring: John Gregson; Muriel Pavlow; Barry Fitzgerald
- Cinematography: Christopher Challis
- Edited by: Peter Bezencenet
- Music by: Philip Green
- Production company: George H. Brown Productions
- Distributed by: Rank Organisation
- Release dates: 24 March 1958 (London, England)
- Running time: 88 minutes
- Country: United Kingdom
- Language: English

Rooney is a 1958 British comedy film directed by George Pollock and starring John Gregson, Muriel Pavlow and Barry Fitzgerald. The screenplay was by Patrick Kirwan based on the 1957 novel of the same name by Catherine Cookson. The film depicts the life of James Ignatius Rooney, a Gaelic sportsman at the weekends, and a Dublin rubbish collector during the week.

== Plot ==
James Rooney, a Dublin dustman and champion hurling player, leaves his digs to avoid the advances of his landlady. He finds a room with a widow, Mrs. O'Flynn, forced to take in lodgers. She allows Rooney to keep his dog, Rags, although not impressed he is a dustman. O'Flynn's daughter Doreen also dislikes Rooney but Maire, Mrs. O'Flynn's niece, is more welcoming, as is Grandpa, who owns the house.

Mr. Doolan, a rich man, picks Rooney to play in the All-Ireland Hurley Final and Rooney becomes famous, causing Doreen to be interested in him. Granpa dies and leaves his possessions to Maire.

Maire is wrongly charged with stealing a necklace Rooney had given her. Rooney decides to marry Maire.

== Cast ==
- John Gregson as James Ignatius Rooney
- Muriel Pavlow as Maire Hogan
- Barry Fitzgerald as Grandfather
- June Thorburn as Doreen O'Flynn
- Noel Purcell as Tim Hennessy
- Marie Kean as Mrs. O'Flynn
- Liam Redmond as Mr. Doolan
- Jack MacGowran as Joe O'Connor
- Eddie Byrne as Mickey Hart
- Philip O'Flynn as Paddy Ryan
- Harold Goldblatt as Police Inspector
- Pauline Delaney as Mrs. Wall
- Godfrey Quigley as Tom Reilly
- Irene Browne as Mrs. Manning ffrench
- Joan Phillips as Sheila O'Flynn
- Maureen Toal as Kathleen O'Flynn

== Production ==
=== Development ===
The film is based on a novel by Catherine Cookson that was published in 1957. Screen rights were bought by producer George H. Brown of the Rank Organisation who had just made a film based on another Cookson novel, Jacqueline. The screen adaptation changed several things about the novel including relocating it from Tyneside to Ireland, which had also been done for Jacqueline (that was set in Northern Ireland while Rooney was set in Dublin). T"They said that audiences couldn't understand the Geordie accent but were used to the Irish brogue," said Cookson.

The film was announced in February 1957, with John Gregson, who had been in Jacqueline, attached to star in Rooney. "I think he's a very good actor and a charming person," said Cookson.

Clive Donner claimed he was offered the job of directing the film after having made his feature debut with The Secret Place (1957) but he turned it down. George Pollock was hired to direct after impressing producer George Brown as an assistant director on Dangerous Exile.

"You have to cast your directors as carefully as you cast your actors," said Brown. "And Pollock was the obvious choice. He has great qualities. Warmth, humanity, keen observation."

"It is unlikely to be a critic's picture," said Pollock of Rooney. "But it will be entertainmet. People today want to be moved, not sit through something they don't understand."

=== Shooting ===
Filming took nine weeks starting September 1957, first on location at Dublin and then at Pinewood Studios. Brown said he wanted to make something like Marty (1955). During (or just prior to) filming Barry Fitzgerald expressed interest in playing the grandfather. The actor who had been cast was replaced and Cookson rewrote the script for Fitzgerald. She was not paid or credited for this work.

Muriel Pavlow called the film "a sweet Cinderella story really" and said Gregson "was very easygoing and relaxed" and Fitzgerald "was an old darling. We were all very protective of him, because he really was very old at that stage. We worried that we might be tiring him or whatever, but he was fine."

== Critical reception ==
Variety write "Without any blarney, this happy go-lucky little Irish comedy is one of the most pleasing British candidates for the entertainment stakes yet entered this season. It will rate no Oscars, but its downto-earth appeal cannot fail to please audiences in every family house in Britain and the U.S. Having passed, with honors, the Dublin boxoffice test, "Rooney" can face the Irish in N.Y. with equal confidence."

The Monthly Film Bulletin wrote: "Rooney begins quite promisingly: a jaunty theme-song is heard over the credits, the Dublin locations are well presented and the central situation has a gentle charm. With the entrance of the hero into the snobbish O'Flynn household, however, the film takes on an undesirably mawkish tone. A lively quartet of comic Irish dustmen (Eddie Byrne, Philip O'Flynn, Jack MacGowan, Noel Purcell) plus Barry Fitzgerald's crusty ancient provide the story's firmest assets."

Picturegoer wrote: "Raise your hat to your dustman, he's a man in a million. This gentle, kindly comedy, as homely as stout and Irish stew, sets out to prove that where there's muck – there's a lot of laughs."

Bosley Crowther in The New York Times gave the film a mixed review though he added that, "we must say, John Gregson goes at the title role of the happy young bachelor dustman with a lively good nature and comic will."

Filmink called it "an odd duck – a gentle comedy-drama... A very light film, not well remembered today, it was actually quite popular in Ireland and Britain – in part, one assumes, due to the affability of star John Gregson, who we think was a very under-rated star of this period."

In British Sound Films: The Studio Years 1928–1959 David Quinlan rated the film as "good", writing: "Irish fable has realistic backgrounds, some charm."

Tony Sloman in the Radio Times gave the piece three out of five stars, calling it "really quite charming."

Allmovie found the film "Stronger on characterisation than plot," noting that "The film is at its best when the camera roams around the misty streets of Dublin, and at its worst when it pauses for sentiment."

Cookson later said the film "was very disappointing. It was not my story... The way they treated me was scandalous. I vowed then that I would never deal with J. Arthur Rank again and I never have. I would not let them film one of my books even if I was starving."

== Box office ==
Kinematograph Weekly listed it as being "in the money" at the British box office in 1958.

The movie was a box office success in Ireland.

However Cookson's biographer called the film a financial disaster.

== Notes ==
- Goodwin, Cliff (1999). The Catherine Cookson companion.
