= The Good Companions (1933 film) =

1933 British comedy film

- U.S. film poster
- Directed by: Victor Saville
- Written by: Ian Dalrymple; Edward Knoblock; W. P. Lipscomb; Angus MacPhail
- Based on: The Good Companions by J.B. Priestley
- Produced by: Michael Balcon; Louis Levy; George Pearson; Thomas Welsh
- Starring: Jessie Matthews; John Gielgud; Edmund Gwenn
- Cinematography: Bernard Knowles
- Edited by: Frederick Y. Smith
- Music by: George Posford lyrics: Douglas Furber
- Production company: Gaumont British Picture Corporation
- Distributed by: Ideal
- Release dates: 28 February 1933 (London, England)
- Running time: 113 minutes
- Country: England
- Language: English
- Budget: $200,000-$300,000

The Good Companions (also known as J.B. Priestley's the Good Companions) is a 1933 British comedy film directed by Victor Saville starring Jessie Matthews, John Gielgud and Edmund Gwenn. It was written by Ian Dalrymple, Edward Knoblock, W. P. Lipscomb and Angus MacPhail based on the 1929 novel of the same name by J.B. Priestley.

== Plot ==
A group of widely divergent characters meet up with a broken-down touring concert-party, throw in their lot with them, and eventually triumph after temporary setbacks. This British musical-comedy follows an unlikely trio as they try to revive the fortunes of the floundering theatrical troupe. School teacher Inigo Jolifant with his talent for songwriting, and recently unemployed Jess Oakroyd with his theatrical ambitions, together persuade Miss Trant, an older single woman looking for adventure, to fund them as they attempt to bring "The Dinky Doos" back into the spotlight. Susie Dean s a chorus girl who dreams of stardom, and when she's made the new leader of the show, it looks as if her dreams may finally come true.

== Cast ==
- Jessie Matthews as Susie Dean
- Edmund Gwenn as Jess Oakroyd
- John Gielgud as Inigo Jollifant
- Mary Glynne as Miss Elizabeth Trant
- Percy Parsons as Morton Mitcham
- Alec Fraser as Doctor Hugh MacFarlane
- Max Miller as Millbrau
- A. W. Baskcomb as Jimmy
- Florence Gregson as Mrs. Oakroyd
- Frank Pettingell as Sam Oglethorpe
- Laurence Hanray as Mr. Tarvin
- Annie Esmond as Mrs. Tarvin
- George Zucco as Fauntley
- Frederick Piper as Ted Oglethorpe
- Cyril Smith as Leonard Oakroyd
- Tom Shale as Gatford hotel landlord
- Dennis Hoey as Joe Brundit
- Richard Dolman as Jerry Jerningham
- Mignon O'Doherty as Mrs. Tipstead
- Finlay Currie as Monte Mortimer
- Jack Hawkins as Albert
- Ivor Barnard as Eric Tipstead
- Olive Sloane as Effie
- Wally Patch as Fred, driver's mate
- Barbara Gott as Big Annie
- Mae Bacon as Gatford barmaid
- Ben Williams as man cleaning windows at hotel reception
- Henry Ainley as narrator

== Production ==
Gielgud had appeared in the 1931 theatrical version of the novel, written by Priestley, which had run for more than three hundred performances in the West End. Adele Dixon who had played Susie Dean on stage was replaced by Jessie Matthews.

It was shot at the Lime Grove Studios in Shepherd's Bush. The film's sets were designed by the art director Alfred Junge while the costumes were by Gordon Conway. Henry Ainley was originally cast in the film but his drinking meant he was unable to finish the film; he was replaced by Edmund Gwenn and his scenes were reshot.

== Critical reception ==
In comparing the film to the book, The New York Times critic Mordaunt Hall wrote, "It is, indeed, a better production than was to be expected, for, while there are omissions and a certain hastening of parts of the narrative, the cheery personalities are present and in good form," and concluded, "Miss Matthews sings pleasingly and dances gracefully, while Mr. Gielgud's portrayal is extraordinarily real. It is one of those stories which is all the more worth while for having been made in England, for, aside from the naturalness of the players, there are the scenes of country houses and hedged roads, which add to the general effect of the picture."

Time Out wrote, "Saville's direction is adequate rather than inspired, but he elicits marvellous performances from his disparate cast. Matthews' portrayal of a bubblingly neurotic soubrette is wonderful, and not surprisingly shot her to stardom. The film does feed on rather than explore the twee camaraderie of the provincial touring company, but an English backstage musical as witty and well-handled as this is something to be thankful for indeed".

Leonard Maltin called it "a delightful film. Matthews is given full rein to display her considerable musical and comedic charms; Gielgud is equally humorous and surprising. He even sings!"
