= Vice Versa (1948 film) =

- Petula Clark and Anthony Newley
- Directed by: Peter Ustinov
- Written by: Peter Ustinov
- Based on: Vice Versa; 1882 novel by F. Anstey
- Produced by: George H. Brown; Peter Ustinov
- Starring: Roger Livesey; Anthony Newley; Petula Clark; Kay Walsh
- Cinematography: Jack Hildyard
- Edited by: John D. Guthridge
- Music by: Antony Hopkins
- Production company: Two Cities Films
- Distributed by: General Film Distributors
- Release date: January 1948
- Running time: 111 minutes
- Country: United Kingdom
- Language: English

Vice Versa is a 1948 British comedy film written and directed by Peter Ustinov and starring Roger Livesey, Anthony Newley, Petula Clark, and Kay Walsh. It is the third screen adaptation of the 1882 novel Vice Versa by F. Anstey. The film was produced by Two Cities Films and distributed by General Film Distributors.

== Plot ==
The film begins with an elderly Paul Bultitude seeing his son, Dick, and new daughter-in-law Dulcie off after their wedding. He then directly addresses the audience, implied to be reporters, about a story he has been embarrassed to discuss for years about how he and his son have had such a strong relationship.

During the British Raj, unscrupulous Marmaduke Paradine steals the Garuda Stone, the magical eye of an Indian idol, which grants one wish to each possessor. He had been warned that the thief of the stone would have bad luck; convinced by the time he returns to England, he gives it to the recently widowed Paul, his former brother-in-law.

Paul, a wealthy stockbroker, cannot understand why his eldest son Dick is reluctant to return to boarding school after a holiday. Paul recalls the carefree days of his youth and casually wishes he could take Dick's place while holding the stone. As a result, he finds himself looking just like his son. When Dick realizes what has happened, the neglected boy uses his wish to take on his father's appearance, eager to enjoy the perks of being an adult.

Dick cheerfully sends his protesting father off to school, while he throws parties, flirts with Alice, the maid, and even carries on with his father's girlfriend Fanny Verlayne. He also enters into a partnership in a new horseless carriage business, becoming even wealthier. Meanwhile, Paul's pompous behavior soon antagonizes his classmates and the disciplinarian headmaster, Dr. Grimstone. He also puzzles Grimstone's daughter Dulcie, who cannot understand why her once-attentive beau seems to be smitten with a much-older Fanny.

Paul escapes the bullying at school and returns home, only to overhear Paradine tell Fanny how he plans to trick Dick into signing away control of his horseless carriage company. He pleads with his son to restore them back to their proper bodies, but Dick cannot remember where he left the stone. Paul finally finds it in the hands of his younger son Rollie and gets him to wish things back. Chastened by his experience, Paul becomes more understanding of Dick's situation and has Dr. Grimstone, who had followed him home, removed from the premises.

Back in the present, Paul explains that Fanny left him and that two years prior, Dr. Grimstone died of a heart attack while beating a boy. He is forever remembered for being humiliated by the Bultitudes. The Garuda Stone was stolen by an eager thief who accidentally wished himself away from the police to the North Pole. Paul warns the audience that if they were to find a green-grey stone with a handle on it to not make any wishes. Being lonely, he ended up marrying Alice the maid who gives him an earful for wasting his time telling the story.

== Cast ==
- Roger Livesey as Paul Bultitude / Dick Bultitude
- Anthony Newley as Dick Bultitude / Paul Bultitude
- Petula Clark as Dulcie Grimstone
- Kay Walsh as Fanny Verlayne
- Hugh Dempster as Colonel Ambrose
- David Hutcheson as Marmaduke Paradine
- James Robertson Justice as Dr. Grimstone
- Robert Eddison as Mr. Blinkhorn
- Patricia Raine as Alice
- Joan Young as Mrs. Grimstone
- Ernest Jay as Bowler

== Reception ==
At the time of its release, the critic for the Daily Mirror wrote: "Peter Ustinov has deliberately exaggerated in the film. This may bring him into conflict with lovers of the original story. But the fact remains that this spectacular burlesque has many novel touches and gets the laughs. Personally, I enjoyed myself, and I think you will."

The Monthly Film Bulletin wrote: "It is funny in patches, but goes on far too long; and the director, who also wrote the screenplay, would have been wiser to cut some of his own additions. Anthony Newley... is excellent in a long and exacting part, and Petula Clark is attractive as the headmaster's daughter, but it is sad to see as good an actor as Roger Livesey with nothing to do but make an ass of himself."

The Daily Film Renter wrote: "It is acted with polish and precision by a number of talented players; there are plenty of humorous situations, and it is commendable for its novelty. A sophisticated type of comedy, with fruity burlesque as its big drawing card. ... The leading roles of father and son are taken by Roger Livesey and Anthony Newley, both of whom put plenty of hard work into the difficult job of spanning the generations ... Each of the supporting players gives a highly individual performance, but it is the bearded Jehovah of a schoolmaster, played by James Robertson Justice, who gets the most laughs and, in fact, steals the picture."

Picture Show wrote: "F. Anstey was a well-known Victorian humorous writer but whether his humour stands the test of time and translation to the screen is questionable. There is a faithful Victorian background to this schoolboy-prankish story of a pompous father and rebellious son who change bodies, but retain their own tastes and habits. Both find it tedious in the end. So did we – despite the excellence of the cast."

Leonard Maltin observed that "parts of it are silly, but much of it is inspired and hilarious."
