= The Boy Who Stole a Million =

1960 British film by Charles Crichton

- Directed by: Charles Crichton
- Written by: Charles Crichton; Niels West-Larsen
- Produced by: George H. Brown
- Starring: Maurice Reyna; Virgílio Teixeira
- Cinematography: Douglas Slocombe
- Edited by: Peter Bezencenet
- Music by: Tristram Cary
- Production companies: Fanfare Films Ltd. George H. Brown Productions
- Distributed by: Bryanston Films
- Release dates: 22 December 1960 (USA); 2 July 1961 (UK)
- Running time: 84 minutes
- Country: United Kingdom
- Language: English
- Budget: £115,802
- Box office: £7,525 (UK)

The Boy Who Stole a Million is a 1960 British comedy thriller film directed by Charles Crichton and starring Maurice Reyna and Virgílio Teixeira.

== Plot ==
When he learns that his father needs to find 10,000 pesetas (approximately £60) to finance repairs to his taxi, or face losing his business and livelihood, naïve young Paco decides to "borrow" a million pesetas from the bank where he has a small part-time job after school.

He is forced to hide around the city when he starts to be pursued not only by the police, but also seemingly by all the criminal low-life of the city, all eager to get their hands on the cash. Paco finds himself on the run all through Valencia, from the most elegant quarters with their wide streets and squares in the midst of fiesta time, to the city's most squalid and dangerous slums.

Paco has no concept of money in the adult sense. When he is hungry he tells a street vendor that he "has no money" and has to beg for the food.

Hiding beside a blind beggar the man leads him to an abandoned basement and attacks him, as he too has heard of the child and missing money but the boy escapes.

The package of money gets thrown in a garbage truck and Paco ends up scraping through piles of rubbish with local street urchins who do this to survive. He finds it and spends some time with the group. Meanwhile his father drives around the city with two friends, also searching for him.

When his father eventually finds him Paco explains that he heard his father say he would disown him if he ever stole. After one final fight with the pursuing thugs they take the cash back to the bank. The bank manager is very understanding and merely charges Paco 168 pesetas interest for the 24 hours he had the money. They agree the bank will take this interest charge out of Paco's wages at the rate of 2 pesetas per week.

== Cast ==
- Maurice Reyna as Paco
- Virgílio Teixeira as Miguel
- Marianne Benet as Maria
- Harold Kasket as Luis
- George Coulouris as bank manager
- Warren Mitchell as Pedro
- Tutte Lemkow as Mateo
- Edwin Richfield as commissionaire
- Bill Nagy as Police Chief
- Barta Barri as gang leader
- Paul Whitsun-Jones as Desk Sergeant
- Robert Rietti as Detective
- Cyril Shaps as bank clerk
- Xan Das Bolas as knife grinder

== Production ==
The film was originally budgeted at £100,000 – £49,500 coming from Lloyds Bank/Barclays, £49,500 coming from Paramount and £1,000 deferred from Paramount. The film went over budget and the rest was made up by the guarantor, Film Finances.

The film was shot on location in the Spanish city of Valencia.

Crichton called the film "pretty simple."

== Reception ==
=== Box Office ===
The film recorded a loss to Bryanston of £52,330.

=== Critical ===
The Monthly Film Bulletin wrote: "A perfunctory attempt at a British Bicycle Thieves [1948], packed with clichés both in script and in Charles Crichton's direction. The boy, the dog and the father have charm, but the story never comes alive, and the supporting roles – apart from one or two sinister Spanish bit-players – are flatly portrayed."

Kine Weekly wrote: "The picture is soon off he mark and gathers widely varied, yet apposite characters as its actionful, if artless, tale develops. ... The fiesta scenes provide local colour, while the fight between the crooks and Paco, Miguel and Maria, which takes place on a sea wall, puts a real kick into the climax. ... Star values are negligible."

Leslie Halliwell said: "Half-hearted attempt at a British Bicycle Thieves, oddly set in Spain and never quite managing to convince or interest us."

The Radio Times Guide to Films gave the film 1/5 stars, writing: "Not even the drab photography or the rundown locations can increase the authenticity of the protracted pursuit by some sniffy bank officials and a gang of sneaky criminals. A cloying and unconvincing disappointment."
