= Gordon Conway (costume designer) =

American fashion designer (1894–1956)

- Born: 18 December 1894; Cleburne, Texas, USA
- Died: 9 June 1956 (aged 61); Virginia, USA
- Occupations: Costume designer and illustrator
- Spouse: Blake Ozias (married 1920–1927)

Gordon Conway (18 December 1894 – 9 June 1956) was an illustrator and costume designer who designed for British films in the 1920s and 1930s. She established the first specialist costume department in Britain's film studios in the early 1930s. She worked closely with leading film producer Michael Balcon, and her notable films included High Treason (1929), Sunshine Susie (1931) and The Good Companions (1933).

Conway's biographer, Raye Virginia Allen, credits her with helping to "shape the way early-twentieth century women looked and aspired to look... in an atmosphere of sweeping change on both sides of the Atlantic". She was, according to Allen, "the quintessential jazz age flapper".

Gordon's distinctive masculine first name had been chosen by her father before her birth and, according to the designer, had been "useful" in her career, as many theatre managers would not agree to see female designers.

== Early life ==
Conway was born in Cleburne, Texas, to Jack and Tommie Conway. Jack Conway was a wealthy businessman with a chain of lumberyards. Tommie Conway, Gordon's mother, was a widely travelled social leader "with business acumen". Gordon attended the National Cathedral School in Washington, D.C. before travelling to Europe for finishing school in Switzerland and Rome.

== Career ==
In London in 1915, she was introduced to Heyworth Campbell, the art editor for Condé Nast magazines, and was commissioned to produce fashion illustrations for Vogue and Vanity Fair. She also produced hundreds of advertising posters for products from hats to motorcars, and illustrated children's books and novels. Her drawings from 1919–20 display the New Woman style of a long narrow silhouette, cropped hair and witty panache—which commentators also noted was reflected in the appearance of the artist herself.

By the late 1910s, Conway had started designing theatre posters and soon moved into set and costume designs for cabarets and plays. For The Charm School (1920), directed by Robert Milton, Conway created a total design concept encompassing set design, costume and marketing materials.

After her marriage to Blake Ozias in 1920, Conway, her husband and mother moved to Europe, where she continued to illustrate for fashion magazines, becoming a public personality. Conway and Ozias's marriage last until 1927, when they divorced in Paris. In 1928, Conway settled into a home studio and residence in London, where she stayed until 1936.

In the mid-1920s, Conway began designing costumes for London stage revues, cabarets and musicals, including From Dover Street to Dixie (1923), Patricia (1925) and Peggy Ann (1927). This was a golden era for revue in London, a genre that embraced modernity and humour. Conway's commissions often involved designing the whole production, and she brought in costumiers and couturier to produce the costumes.

By the end of the decade, she had progressed to designing for film. Between 1927 and 1929, the early sound period of British cinema, Conway designed costumes for high-profile films including Confetti (1927) and High Treason (1929). At the same time, Conway published accounts of her work that explained the technical and creative demands of costuming film: the use of fabrics, lighting, and the importance of personality.

Between 1929 and 1935, Conway designed costumes for more than thirty films, frequently appeared in the promotional materials as the "famous designer", and was acclaimed in film fan magazines. The actor Jessie Matthews, who worked with Conway on The Good Companions (1933), credited the designer with "the ability to express a person's essential character and personality through their clothes". Film historian Melanie Bell has also documented Conway's skills as a negotiator, able to persuade producers and financiers not to "scrimp on costs", and her ability to manoeuvre through the business side of film production and costume management.

In 1933, Conway was appointed chief costume designer for Gaumont-British Studios. She stated at the time that she employed thirty women, but hoped to grow to fifty, and "it will be run entirely by women". The following year, however, she retired from film costume design, due to ill health.

Conway kept a daily diary of her appointments, work activities, and film-watching habits. These diaries, and many of Conway's designs and work notes, are held in the Harry Ransom Center at the University of Texas at Austin.

== Career ==
Gordon Conway died on 9 June 1956 at her family's home in Virginia, United States.
