= Cocoanut Grove (Ambassador Hotel) =

Former nightclub in Los Angeles, California, US

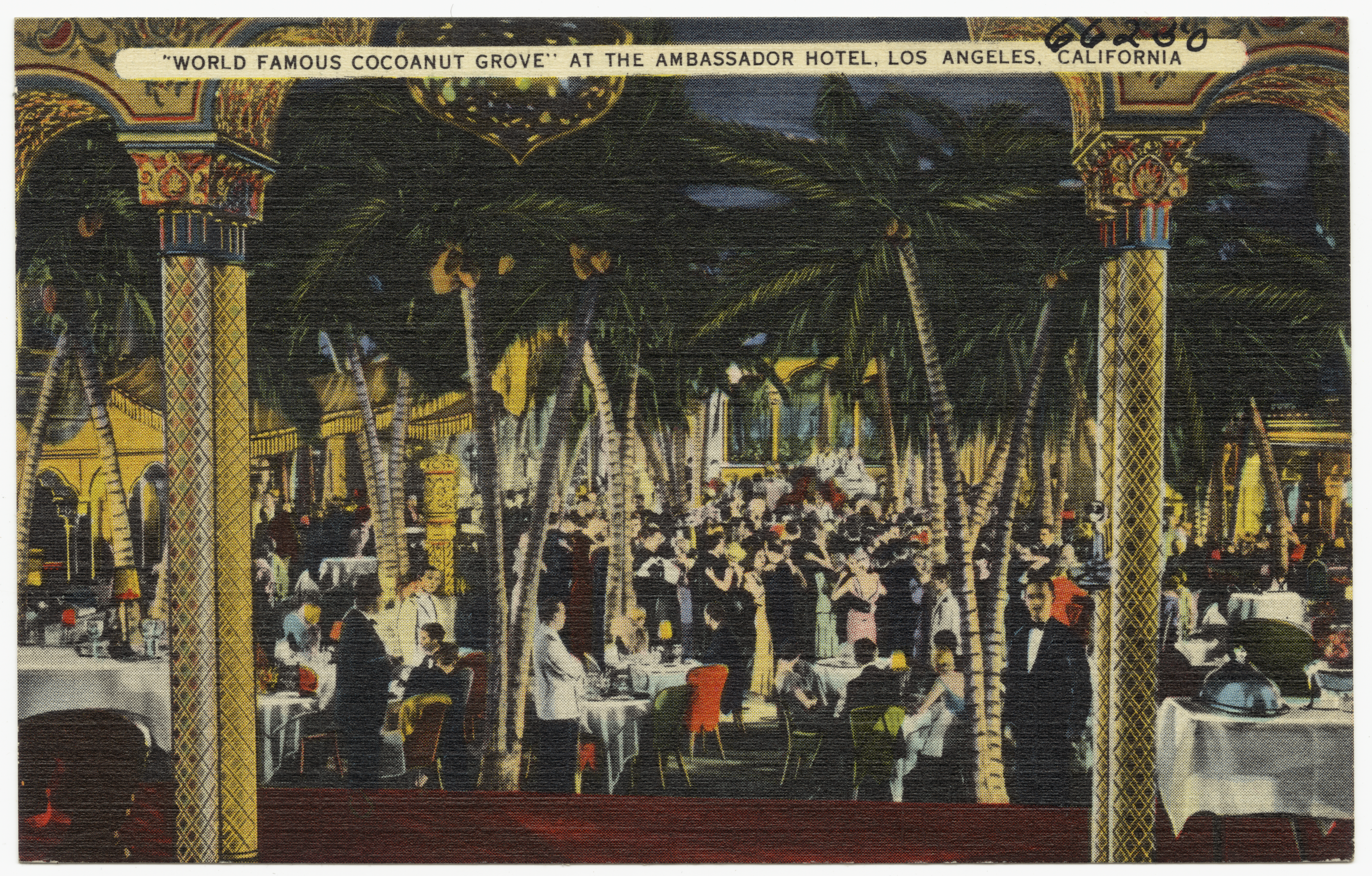
"World famous cocoanut grove" at the Ambassador Hotel, Los Angeles, California in the 1930s (Tichnor Bros. postcard)

The Cocoanut Grove was a nightclub inside the Ambassador Hotel on Wilshire Boulevard in Los Angeles. It featured lavish exotic décor and was open from 1921 until 1989. The club continued as a filming location until the hotel was demolished in 2006. The Cocoanut Grove was "probably the most beloved public room of all time", society columnist Christy Fox wrote in the Los Angeles Times.

== Opening ==
The Ambassador Hotel opened on January 1, 1921. The lavish resort sprawled over 24 acres on Wilshire Boulevard and became a magnet for high-profile guests including many Hollywood celebrities. The hotel's original nightclub was called the Zinnia Grill and featured murals painted on black satin walls. Dancers could take a break on the "Parrot Porch", an outdoor aviary filled with plants, canaries and parrots.

With high demand for evening entertainment, hotel management converted the main ballroom into a new venue called The Cocoanut Grove, which opened on April 21, 1921. The room seated 1000 in tiered seating, with boxes reserved on an annual basis.

== Decor and atmosphere ==
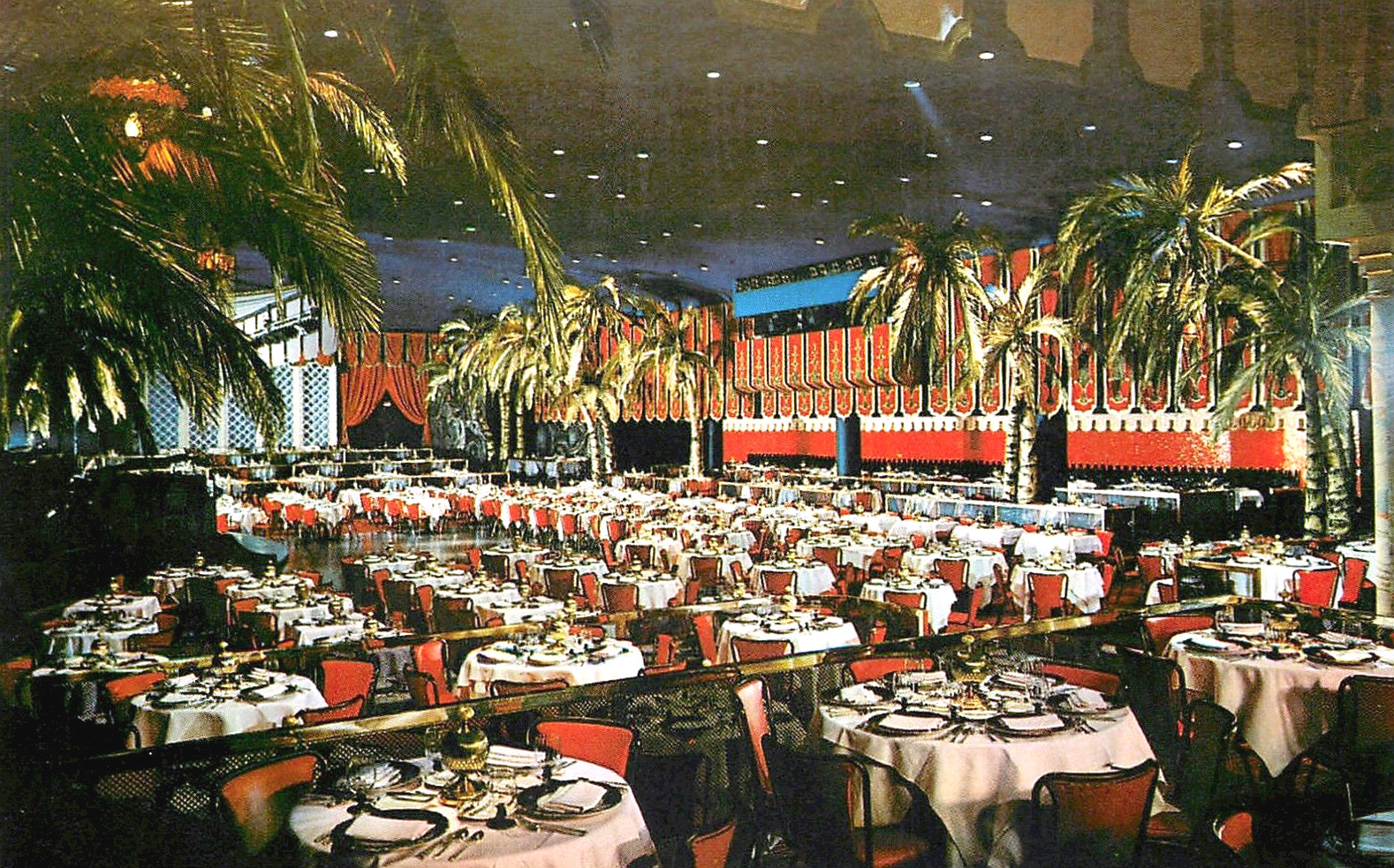
Ambassador Hotel Cocoanut Grove interior in 1965

The design was an amalgam of "exotic" styles from around the world. The entrance doors were gold leafed and etched with palm trees, the room featured Moorish arches, a tropical mural with an illuminated moon and running waterfall, and Chinese lanterns strung between papier-mâché coconut palm trees salvaged from the set of the Rudolph Valentino film The Sheik. The ceiling featured illuminated stars in the style of atmospheric theaters that were popular in the 1920s. Life-sized, mechanical monkey figures with glowing amber eyes were placed in the trees. Actor John Barrymore is said to have brought his pet monkey to drinks with W. C. Fields at the hotel in 1932 when the animal climbed a tree to inspect the monkey dolls. A monkey in a top hat became the club's logo.

== Events and guests ==
The hotel was close to Hancock Park, and provided a place for its moneyed residents to entertain, dine, and partake in debutante balls. As the film industry grew in prestige, the Cocoanut Grove was "responsible for bringing together the worlds of society and show business" according to the hotel's PR director Margaret Tante Burk. The hotel's bungalows attracted New York actors visiting Los Angeles to work on films.

A "great night frolic" in 1922 was produced by Florenz Ziegfeld Jr. and featured dancing girls and the Abe Lyman orchestra. Big bands played for New Year's Eve parties, TK and dance contests, in which Joan Crawford and Gloria Swanson famously faced off against each other. Hollywood studio heads Charles Chaplin, Jesse Lasky and Louis B. Mayer were frequent judges of the contests.

Celebrities were safe from photographers at the club, which had a policy forbidding unwanted cameras, and let loose with lavish soirees. The club was Hollywood's "first playground of the stars" according to historian Jim Heimann. Marion Davies famously rode a white horse through the hotel lobby en route to a costume party at the Cocoanut Grove. The Academy Awards were held at the nightclub five times, beginning in 1930. Famous bandleaders were heard on live radio broadcasts originating from the club. "It was always desirable (to play the Cocoanut Grove)," said bandleader Guy Lombardo. "Because it was practically a guarantee that we could do film work during the day then have the great exposure of the coast-to-coast broadcast in the evening." Singer Bing Crosby was discovered singing with his band The Rhythm Boys. The club was parodied in the 1936 Merrie Melodies cartoon The CooCoo Nut Grove. Scenes from the 1937 and 1954 versions of A Star is Born were filmed at the Cocoanut Grove.

The dinner menu, prepared by chef Henri, would often include citrus fruit and fresh California produce with traditional Continental dishes prepared in a California style. During the 1930s, the club saw banquets celebrating the second birthday of Mickey Mouse and feting the athletes of the 1932 Olympics. The big bands of Harry James, Horace Heidt and Carmen Cavallero played through World War II when the venue became a favorite of visiting servicemen looking for something glamorous to write home about.

== Remodels ==
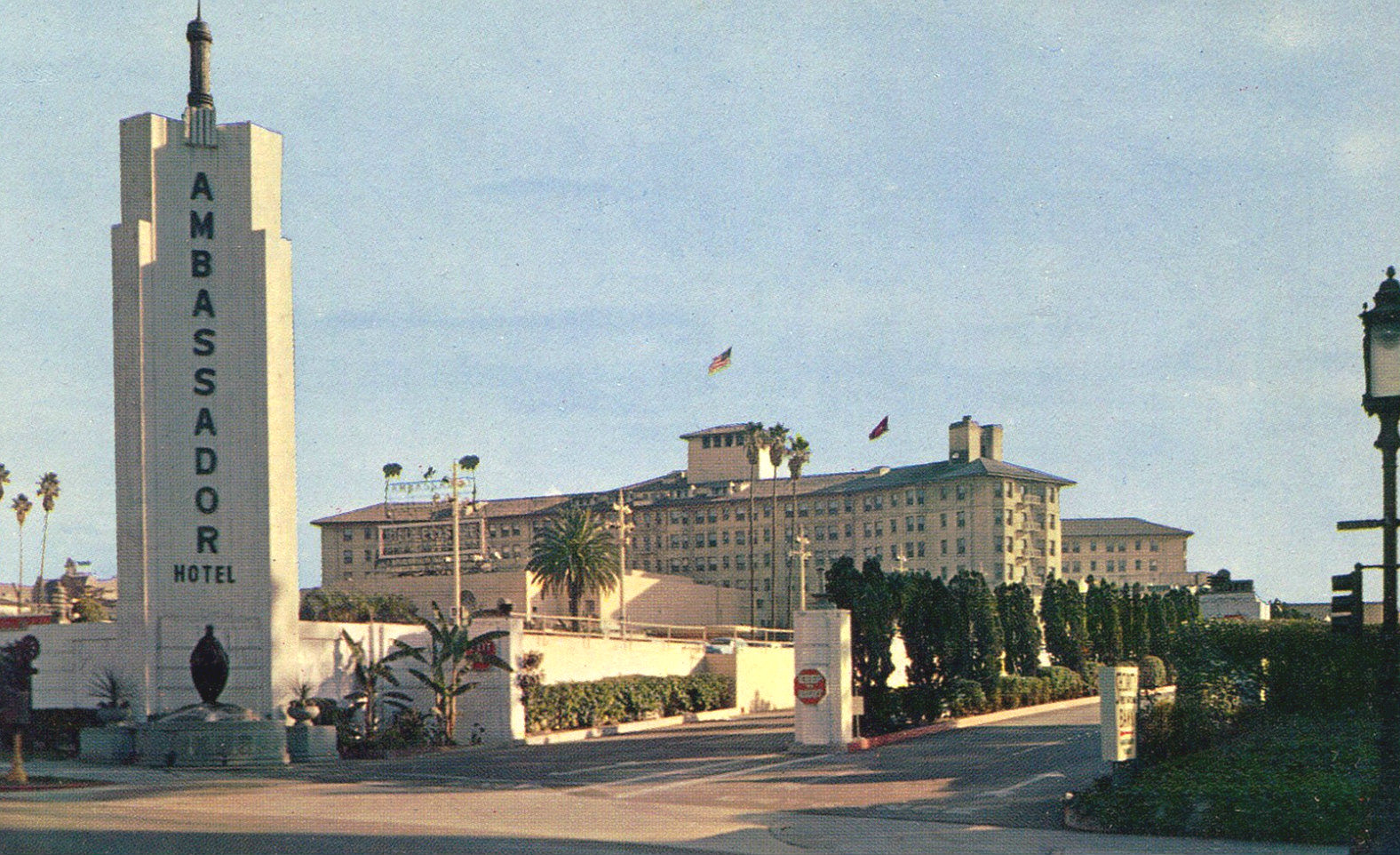
Ambassador Hotel entrance gate in 1959

The club was remodeled in 1939 and in 1957, but stayed a popular location for live music, with concerts by Frank Sinatra, Lena Horne, Johnny Mathis, Bobby Darin, Peggy Lee and Nat "King" Cole. The Cocoanut Grove was the first major club to hire Harry Belafonte, and Dean Martin got his first movie deal after an appearance there. In 1958, Judy Garland recorded a live album, Garland at the Grove, in one take. Barbra Streisand was cast in Funny Girl shortly after her three-week stint at the club.

During the 1960s, the club continued hosting dance bands, but mixed in contemporary acts including Ray Charles, Paul Anka, Don Ho, Robert Goulet, Buddy Greco, Shirley Bassey, Petula Clark, Al Martino, Dionne Warwick, Liza Minnelli and Diana Ross & the Supremes. Business was falling off at nightclubs and, by 1970, a decision was made to completely rebuild the club to create a Las Vegas style showroom.

Sammy Davis Jr. was hired to advise on the décor, sound, and lighting for the new room, to be called "The Now Grove". Davis hosted a wrecking party on February 24, 1970, where patrons were encouraged to destroy the room in advance of the major remodel. The new club was designed by Phyllis Mann and Harry Fox and decorated in shades of black, silver, purple, orange and pink with a new main entrance. The biggest stars of the Las Vegas strip were recruited, including Tony Bennett, Nancy Sinatra, Sonny & Cher, Aretha Franklin and Phyllis Diller. Audiences flocked to the shows, but production expenses exceeded revenue and "The Now Grove" closed in 1972.

A new management team renamed the room "The Cocoanut Grove" and it reopened on October 31, 1972, with acts including The Four Tops, Jerry Van Dyke and Kaye Ballard, who worked for less than the bigger name stars.

== Closure ==
As tastes changed, and the neighborhood around the hotel suffered gang and drug problems, the venue fell dark throughout much of the 1970s and 80s, with the exception of private parties, conventions and filming. The hotel still threw occasional parties in the Grove until it closed in 1989. The Cocoanut Grove remained a popular filming location until the hotel was demolished in 2006.
