= School for Secrets =

1946 British war drama film

- British quad poster
- Directed by: Peter Ustinov
- Screenplay by: Peter Ustinov
- Produced by: George H. Brown; Peter Ustinov
- Starring: Ralph Richardson; Raymond Huntley; Richard Attenborough; John Laurie; David Tomlinson; Ernest Jay
- Cinematography: Jack Hildyard
- Edited by: Russell Lloyd
- Music by: Alan Rawsthorne
- Production company: Two Cities Films
- Distributed by: General Film Distributors
- Release date: 7 November 1946
- Running time: 108 minutes
- Country: United Kingdom
- Language: English

School for Secrets (also known as The Secret Flight) is a 1946 British black-and-white drama film written and directed by Peter Ustinov and starring Ralph Richardson. In leading supporting roles are Raymond Huntley, John Laurie, David Tomlinson, Ernest Jay and Richard Attenborough. Based on a 1942 RAF training film for would-be 'boffins' and developed with the full co-operation of the Air Ministry, the film celebrates the discovery of radar, its discoverers and the enabling culture. Produced by Two Cities Films, it was shot at Denham Studios with sets designed by the art director Carmen Dillon.

== Plot ==
School for Secrets tells the story of the "boffins" – research scientists – who discovered and developed radar and helped prevent the German invasion of Britain in 1940. Five scientists, led by Professor Heatherville, are brought together to work in secrecy and under pressure to develop the device. Their dedication disrupts their family lives as they are forced to sacrifice everything to make a breakthrough. Their success is illustrated by the effect radar has on the fighting abilities of the RAF over the skies of Britain in the summer and autumn months of 1940. However, Germany is also planning its own radar capability and British commandos are dispatched to strike a German installation. The raid re-enacted the actual Bruneval Raid on the German Freya radar station on the French coast, where Flt Sgt Cox of the Royal Air Force won the Military Medal. Cox was the radar technician responsible for identifying and removing the relevant German equipment. Army Private Peter Newman, alias Nagle, the German Jewish volunteer, helped identify the correct German technicians who were brought back for crucial questioning on how the parts worked. Thus the scientists complete their work just in time for D-Day.

== Cast ==
- Ralph Richardson as Professor Heatherville
- Raymond Huntley as Professor Laxton-Jones
- John Laurie as Dr. McVitie
- Ernest Jay as Dr. Dainty
- David Tomlinson as Mr. Watlington
- Finlay Currie as Sir Duncan Wills
- Norman Webb as Dr. Wainwright
- Michael Hordern as Lieutenant Commander Lowther
- Pamela Matthews as Mrs. Watlington
- Joan Haythorne as Mrs. Laxton-Jones
- Joan Young as Mrs. McVitie
- Ann Wilton as Mrs. Dainty
- Richard Attenborough as Jack Arnold
- Marjorie Rhodes as Mrs. Arnold
- David Hutcheson as Squadron Leader Sowerby
- Patrick Waddington as Group Captain Aspinall
- Cyril Smith as Flight Sergeant Cox
- James Hayter as R.A.F. Technical Officer
- Robert Wyndham as Commando Major
- Andrew Blackett as Commando Captain
- Bill Owen as Commando NCO
- Robin Bailey as Wives' Escort Officer
- Hugh Dempster as Sqdn. Ldr. Slatter
- Kenneth Milne-Buckley as Sqdn. Ldr. Buckley
- Paul Carpenter as Flt. Lt. Argylle
- Anthony Dawson as Flt. Lt. Norton
- Murray Matheson as Wing Cdr. Allen
- Peggy Evans as Daphne Adams
- Ingrid Forrest as Penelope Birkenshaw
- Geraldine Keyes as Phyllis Hammond
- Vida Hope as WAAF Flight Sergeant
- Edward Lexy as Sir Desmond Prosser
- Hugh Pryse as Sir Nicholas Hathaway
- O. B. Clarence as old retainer
- Aubrey Mallalieu as 1st club member
- Desmond Roberts as 2nd club member
- Guy Belmore as 3rd club member
- Joseph Almas as Dr. Klemmerhahn
- Arthur Rieck as Lt. Hense
- Ernest Urbank as 1st sentry
- Karl Morel as 2nd sentry
- Kenneth More as bomb aimer

== Critical reception ==
The Monthly Film Bulletin wrote: "The film is well constructed, the story is exciting, full of poignancy and humour. Each part – there are no minor parts among the men – is played with directness and restraint."

Kine Weekly wrote: "Laboured and untidy wartime comedy drama, loosely woven from the private lives and professional activities of the Radar backroom boys ... The film is neither instructive, particularly amusing nor flattering to England's incomparable man of science. ... The story of Radar is definitely one that should be told, but not as it is here in a Blimpish comedy vein."

The Radio Times Guide to Films gave the film 3/5 stars, writing: "After the war the RAF and the Ministry of Defence wanted to boast about their invention of radar and the job of producing, directing and writing the account went to the 25-year-old Peter Ustinov. Ralph Richardson plays the boffin and there are some halfhearted action scenes and mini-melodramas to flesh out the reams of technospeak. Ustinov's refusal to make a blatant back-slapper suffuses the film with both a distorted attitude to heroism and a cartoonish wit."

Leslie Halliwell wrote "An unsatisfactory entertainment which, with the best intentions, shuffles between arch comedy, character drama, war action and documentary, doing less than justice to any of these aspects."

TV Guide wrote "as would be expected from young writer-director Ustinov (he was 25 years old at the time), a nice sense of humour is integrated into the proceedings, a refreshing change from the deadly serious propaganda films that dominated the screen at the time. Unfortunately, portions of School for Secrets are too talky and tend to drag on past the point of interest, but the action scenes are excitingly handled and manage to keep the narrative aloft."

Britmovie called the film a "sprightly melodrama. With its starry cast of character actor and witty dialogue, Ustinov focuses more on the diverse characters than scientific advances."
