= The Huggetts (film series) =

British film series

The Huggetts are a fictional family who appear in a series of British films which were released in the late 1940s by Gainsborough Pictures. The films centre on the character of Joe Huggett, played by Jack Warner, the head of a working class London family. Along with the Gainsborough melodramas, the Huggett films proved popular and lucrative for the studio. All four films were directed by Ken Annakin and produced by Betty E. Box.

== Overview and characters ==
The family first appear in the film Holiday Camp (1947), in which the family consists of Joe, his wife Ethel (Kathleen Harrison), their daughter Joan (Hazel Court) and her baby, and their son Harry (Peter Hammond). Jimmy Hanley played Jimmy Gardner, who becomes romantically involved with Joan. Actors Susan Shaw and John Blythe also appear, and return (playing different characters) in the three Huggetts films that followed.

Holiday Camp proved popular enough with post-war British audiences for the family to be spun off for a series of films of their own. In the first, Here Come the Huggetts (1948), characters Joan and Harry were replaced by three daughters: Jane (Jane Hylton), Susan (Susan Shaw) and Pet (Petula Clark). Peter Hammond was recast as Susan's on-off boyfriend Peter Hawtrey, while Jimmy Hanley returned as Jimmy Gardner who is now engaged to Jane. Other regular characters in the series include Ethel's niece, Diana (Diana Dors), Harold Hinchley (David Tomlinson), garage owner Gowan (John Blythe) and Grandma Huggett (Amy Veness). Blythe and Veness were the only actors, besides the main cast, to repeat their roles in all three films. The characters of Jane and Jimmy are missing from the second film but return for the final film, in which Jane is played by Dinah Sheridan.

The first film revolves around the upheaval Diana's arrival at the Huggett home causes, as well as the impending wedding of Jane and Jimmy. The follow-up films were Vote for Huggett (1949), in which Joe stands for election, and The Huggetts Abroad (1949), in which the family emigrate to South Africa and get involved in smuggled diamonds.

== Creative personnel ==
All four films in which the Huggetts appear were directed by Ken Annakin (making his feature film debut with Holiday Camp) and produced by Betty E. Box, while Mabel Constanduros and her nephew Denis Constanduros contributed to all four scripts. Muriel Box, Sydney Box and Peter Rogers were writers on Holiday Camp and Here Come the Huggetts, and Ted Willis worked on the script for Holiday Camp and co-wrote The Huggetts Abroad with Gerard Bryant. Allan MacKinnon co-wrote Vote for Huggett with the Constanduroses.

The Huggetts' theme which appears in all three films was composed by Antony Hopkins.

== List of Huggett film appearances ==
- Holiday Camp (1947)
- Here Come the Huggetts (1948)
- Vote for Huggett (1949)
- The Huggetts Abroad (1949)

== Other appearances ==
Another film, Christmas with the Huggetts, was planned but never made. A BBC radio series, Meet the Huggetts, ran from 1953 to 1962. Both Warner and Harrison reprised the roles of Joe and Ethel, but here their family consists of daughter Jane (Marion Collins) and son Bobby (George Howell), rather than the three sisters of the film series.

== Legacy and influences ==
Warner and Harrison were later reunited in the film Home and Away, about a family in similar circumstances to the Huggetts who win the football pools. The 1952 film The Happy Family, starring Harrison, was also influenced by the Huggetts.

In the fourth wall-breaking pre-credits sequence of the 1949 film It's Not Cricket, stars Basil Radford and Naunton Wayne mention the Huggett films in a contemptuous manner. This film was also produced by Betty E. Box.

== Media releases ==
The Huggetts boxset, including all three films and Holiday Camp, was released on Region Two DVD in May 2007 by ITV Studios Home Entertainment.

== Novelisations ==
In addition to co-authoring the screenplays, Mabel and Denis Constanduros collaborated on novelisations of Here Come the Huggetts, Vote for Huggett and The Huggetts Abroad, all three 1949, published in hardcover by Sampson Low, Marston & Co., Ltd. Each features additional material (some that seems to have been in the original screenplays but subsequently cut) and expanded scenes. There was also a separate novelisation of Here Come the Huggetts released in 1948 as part of editor Eric Warman's magazine-paperback Book of the Film series, written by one of his staff novelisers under one of the mandated house pseudonyms, Warwick Mannon; this earlier, shorter novelization coincided with the initial release of the film and follows it very closely. Finally, Book of the Film also published a novelisation of Holiday Camp by a different writer using another house name, Kit Pedlar, also coincident with the film's release; it contains a long afterword about writing and making the film by Godfrey Winn, author of the original screenstory.
