= Vote for Huggett =

1949 British film

- British 1-sheet poster
- Directed by: Ken Annakin
- Written by: Mabel Constanduros; Denis Constanduros; Allan MacKinnon
- Produced by: Betty E. Box
- Starring: Jack Warner; Kathleen Harrison; Susan Shaw; Petula Clark; David Tomlinson; Diana Dors; Peter Hammond; Amy Veness
- Cinematography: Reginald H. Wyer
- Edited by: Gordon Hales
- Music by: Antony Hopkins
- Production company: Gainsborough Pictures
- Distributed by: General Film Distributors (UK)
- Release date: February 1949
- Running time: 84 minutes
- Country: United Kingdom
- Language: English
- Box office: £143,000 (by 1953)

Vote for Huggett is a 1949 British comedy film directed by Ken Annakin and starring Jack Warner, Kathleen Harrison, Susan Shaw and Petula Clark. It was written by Mabel Constanduros, Denis Constanduros and Allan MacKinnon. In this, the third in the series of films about the Huggetts after Holiday Camp (1947) and Here Come the Huggetts (1948), Warner reprises his role as Joe Huggett, the head of a London family in the post-war years who decides to run as a candidate in the municipal election. It was followed by The Huggetts Abroad (1949).

== Plot ==
After writing a letter to the local newspaper, calling for the construction of a pleasure garden for a new war memorial, Joe Huggett is overwhelmed by the response from the public. However, his call is awkward for a corrupt local councillor Mr. Hall who has plans of his own for the space from which his business can profit. Other people see opportunities of their own in supporting Huggett's plan and he is persuaded to stand for election as a local councillor. In her efforts to help his campaign, his daughter Pet gets rather too enthusiastic. Meanwhile, another daughter Susan's love life gets complicated when her boyfriend Peter Hawtrey proposes marriage and then finds he has competition.

== Cast ==
- Jack Warner as Joe Huggett
- Kathleen Harrison as Ethel Huggett
- Susan Shaw as Susan Huggett
- Petula Clark as Pet Huggett
- David Tomlinson as Harold Hinchley
- Diana Dors as Diana Gowan
- Peter Hammond as Peter Hawtrey
- Amy Veness as Grandma Huggett
- Hubert Gregg as Maurice Lever
- John Blythe as Gowan
- Anthony Newley as Dudley
- Charles Victor as Mr Hall
- Adrianne Allen as Mrs Hall
- Frederick Piper as Bentley
- Eliot Makeham as Christie
- Clive Morton as Campbell
- Norman Shelley as Wilson
- Lyn Evans as Police Sergeant Pike
- Hal Osmond as fishmonger
- Elizabeth Hunt as Mrs Lever
- Ferdy Mayne as Waiter
- Nellie Bowman as eccentric old lady
- Empsie Bowman as eccentric old lady
- Isa Bowman as eccentric old lady

== Production ==
Ken Annakin was reluctant to make The Huggett films, wanting to work on more ambitious material, but did it as a favour to Sydney Box, head of Gainsborough. However, he enjoyed working with the cast.

== Critical reception ==
The Monthly Film Bulletin wrote, "the film is well up to the standard set by the first in the series, and relies for its appeal on its homely humour and fine characterisations by Jack Warner and Kathleen Harrison as Joe and Ethel Huggett, Susan Shaw and Petula Clark as their daughters and Diana Dors as niece Diana. Strong support is rendered by the remainder of the cast."

TV Guide described Vote for Huggett as "one of three films in the rather dismal Huggett Family series".

The Radio Times praised Jack Warner and Kathleen Harrison, "wonderful as mum and dad and yes, that's a young Diana Dors as the troublesome niece".

In British Sound Films: The Studio Years 1928–1959 David Quinlan rated the film as "average", writing: "Standard Huggett shenanigans, quite entertaining."
