= Those People Next Door =

1953 British film by John Harlow

- Australian daybill poster
- Directed by: John Harlow
- Based on: the play Wearing the Pants by Zelda Davees
- Produced by: Tom Blakeley
- Starring: Jack Warner; Charles Victor; Marjorie Rhodes
- Cinematography: Roy Fogwell
- Edited by: Dorothy Stimson
- Music by: Billy Butler (musical director)
- Production company: Mancunian Film Corporation
- Distributed by: Eros Films (UK)
- Release date: February 1953 (UK)
- Running time: 78 minutes
- Country: United Kingdom
- Language: English

Those People Next Door is a 1953 British comedy film directed by John Harlow and starring Jack Warner, Charles Victor and Marjorie Rhodes. It was based on the play Wearing the Pants by Zelda Davees.

== Plot ==
In Second World War era Britain, working-class Sam Twigg and his wife Mary are raising their family in the shadow of the Blitz. Their next door neighbours Joe and Emma practically live in the Twiggs' house, borrowing cups of sugar or using their Anderson shelter. Controversy arises when Sam's pretty daughter Anne becomes romantically involved with RAF officer Victor Stevens. There is disapproval from Victor's wealthy parents, Sir Andrew and Lady Stevens, who object to the match on grounds of class. Lady Stevens even offers money to the Twigg family to call off the relationship, which enrages father Sam. However, when RAF man Victor is reportedly shot down in action, parental attitudes soften.

== Cast ==
- Jack Warner as Sam Twigg
- Charles Victor as Joe Higgins
- Marjorie Rhodes as Mary Twigg
- Gladys Henson as Emma Higgins
- Patricia Cutts as Anne Twigg
- Garry Marsh as Sir Andrew Stevens
- Jimmy James as drunk
- Anthony Newley as Bob Twigg
- Grace Arnold as Lady Stevens
- Norah Gorsen as Margaret Twigg
- Geoffrey Sumner as Flight Lieutenant Claude Kimberley
- Peter Forbes-Robertson as Victor Stevens
- Eli Woods as Eli

== Critical reception ==
Monthly Film Bulletin said "Interspersed with ancient music hall jokes, this film is also often in bad taste. Extremely poor."

Kine Weekly said "Down-to-earth, disarmingly ingenuous British low-life comedy drama ... The picture is a trifle class-conscious during its penultimate '"posh" sequences, but its domestic touches and recreation of conditions during the worst of the bombing periods are very true to life and produce both laughs and tears. Jack Warner typifies all that is best in the British breadwinner as Sam, and Charles Victor is effective."

According to Sky Movies, which gives the film three out of five stars, "The Rank Organisation had unexpectedly boosted its bank balance with comedies about the cockney Hugget family (starring Jack Warner and Kathleen Harrison) in post-war years, but decided to end the series after four films. Unconvinced that this vein of comedy had been mined out, producer Tom Blakeley's Manchester-based film unit, which had made Frank Randle comedies in the war years, took an old play set in 1941, hired Jack Warner and a good cast, and let rip. Unfortunately, the characters were too unsympathetic and the piece still ran like a play, but the same distributors had better luck a couple of years later when they reunited Warner with Kathleen Harrison in Home and Away [1956]."

In British Sound Films: The Studio Years 1928–1959 David Quinlan rated the film as "poor", writing: "The Huggett comedy vein mined out; poor and stagey, with dislikeable characters."
