= Here Come the Huggetts =

- Directed by: Ken Annakin
- Written by: Mabel Constanduros; Denis Constanduros; Peter Rogers
- Produced by: Betty E. Box
- Starring: Jack Warner; Kathleen Harrison; Jane Hylton; Susan Shaw; Petula Clark; Jimmy Hanley; David Tomlinson; Diana Dors; Peter Hammond; John Blythe; Amy Veness
- Cinematography: Reginald H. Wyer
- Edited by: Gordon Hales
- Music by: Antony Hopkins
- Production company: Gainsborough Pictures
- Distributed by: General Film Distributors
- Release date: 24 November 1948
- Running time: 93 minutes
- Country: United Kingdom
- Language: English
- Budget: £100,000
- Box office: £127,000

Here Come the Huggetts is a 1948 British comedy film directed by Ken Annakin and starring Jack Warner, Kathleen Harrison, Petula Clark, Jane Hylton, Susan Shaw and Amy Veness, with Diana Dors in an early role. It was written by Mabel Constanduros, Denis Constanduros and Peter Rogers and released by Gainsborough Pictures.

The lead characters of Joe and Ethel had been introduced a year earlier in Holiday Camp (Annakin, 1947) and there were two 1949 sequels: Vote for Huggett and The Huggetts Abroad, also directed by Annakin.

== Plot ==
Factory worker Joe Huggett has a first-time telephone installed at home, for work purposes, but his daughters quickly find a lot more use for it. Diana Hopkins, a flighty cousin of his wife Ethel, arrives for a not-very-welcome visit and causes problems at home and at Joe's workplace when Ethel persuades Joe to get her a job there. Eldest daughter Jane must choose between Jimmy Gardner, her fiancé who has been away in the forces and a new local admirer Harold Hinchley. Meanwhile, the family is planning to go to London to see the royal wedding, and Grandma Huggett joins them in camping out overnight near Buckingham Palace.

== Cast ==
- Jack Warner as Joe Huggett
- Kathleen Harrison as Ethel Huggett
- Jane Hylton as Jane Huggett
- Susan Shaw as Susan Huggett
- Petula Clark as Pet Huggett
- Jimmy Hanley as Jimmy Gardner
- David Tomlinson as Harold Hinchley
- Diana Dors as Diana Hopkins
- Peter Hammond as Peter Hawtrey
- John Blythe as Gowan
- Amy Veness as Grandma Huggett
- Clive Morton as Mr. Campbell
- Maurice Denham as 1st engineer
- Doris Hare as Mrs. Fisher
- Esma Cannon as youth leader
- Alison Leggatt as Miss Perks
- Dandy Nichols as Aunt Edie Hopkins
- Hal Osmond as 2nd engineer
- Peter Scott as office boy
- Keith Shepherd as vicar
- Edmundo Ros as himself

== Production ==
Ken Annakin had directed three films for Sydney Box, then head of Gainsborough Pictures. He was ambitious to do other work but Box offered him Here Come the Huggetts. Annakin wrote in his autobiography:

I had to delay my dreams and ideas for ‘great films’, and churn out The Huggetts series, because Sydney needed them. ... I owed him a debt and had to earn cash as quickly as possible to pay off the mortgage. ...The Huggett years were not really such a bind. Jack Warner and Kathleen Harrison were a joy to work with. Jack would always come in with a new joke, and amuse us with his Maurice Chevalier imitations. Kathleen seemed to adore me and performed, marvellously and amusingly, everything I asked of her. Dinah Sheridan, Jane Hylton, Susan Shaw, Petula Clark and Diana Dors were a great team and fun to work with as well. However, the challenge was no longer there.

Filming took place in June 1948. The working title was Wedding Bells.

Annakin said he had "a little affair with Susan Shaw" while making the films, although he did not specify which ones.

== Reception ==
The Monthly Film Bulletin wrote: "Though the story is negligible, most of the characters are so natural and human that we seem actually to be sharing the lives and emotions of a real, typically English family. Kathleen Harrison and Jack Warner repeat their Holiday Camp success as the mother and father, and are ably supported by the rest of the cast, though Jimmy Hanley is ill-served with a part which amounts to little more than a few lines at the end of the film."

The Daily Film Renter wrote: "The first of the Huggett series starts promisingly enough as an unpretentious popular feature, and should go over very well with the admirers of the Warner-Harrison type of endearing humour. But it is possible to have too much of a good thing, an hour would be long enough. There are too many bits and pieces here which seem to have found their way in for no better reason than to swell the footage – the Royal Wedding for instance – and the earnest burblings of an amateur, psychologist (David Tomlinson) advocating Freud and free love, which is definitely out of place in a family series dedicated to the suburbs."

Variety wrote: "First of a new family series from the Gainsborough Studios, Here Come the Huggetts! is in ineffective production which will achieve little in the home market and less abroad. Entire story about the various Huggett family members, is built around a series of trivial adventures which fail to click. Scripting is bad, both in plot and dialog. Kathleen Harrison and Jack Warner, both of whom are first rate artists, don't have a chance here. The three daughters played by Jane Hylton, Susan Shaw and Petula Clark have already proved they can do much better. Other members of the cast struggle with the inadequate material."

Film reviewer Stephen Vagg described the film as a breakthrough role for Diana Dors.

== Bibliography ==
- Annakin, Ken (2001). So you wanna be a director?. Tomahawk Press. ISBN 978-0953192656.
