= Train of Events =

1949 British film by Sidney Cole et al

- Original British quad poster
- Directed by: Sidney Cole; Charles Crichton; Basil Dearden
- Written by: T.E.B. Clarke; Basil Dearden; Angus MacPhail; Ronald Millar
- Produced by: Michael Balcon; Michael Relph
- Starring: Jack Warner; Peter Finch; Valerie Hobson
- Cinematography: Lionel Banes; Gordon Dines
- Edited by: Bernard Gribble
- Music by: Leslie Bridgewater
- Production company: Ealing Studios
- Distributed by: GFD (UK)
- Release date: 18 August 1949 (UK)
- Running time: 90 minutes
- Country: United Kingdom
- Language: English
- Budget: £144,978

Train of Events is a 1949 British portmanteau film made by Ealing Studios, directed by Sidney Cole, Charles Crichton and Basil Dearden and starring Jack Warner, Peter Finch and Valerie Hobson. The film premiered on 18 August 1949 at the Gaumont Haymarket in London. In the film, as a train is heading for a crash into a stalled petrol tanker at a level crossing, four different stories are told in flashback.

== Plot ==
A Liverpool-bound train departs from Euston station in London in the period immediately after World War II. After dark, the train is travelling north at speed when a lantern being waved by the trackside is seen by the driver. He applies the brakes but a road tanker stalled across a level crossing is looming up just ahead. Plainly, there is not enough room to stop but, just as the collision is about to occur, there is a fade-out succeeded by a view of the locomotive sheds at Euston three days earlier. Personal stories of passengers are then told in flashbacks which make up the "train of events" of the title.

The first story, "The Actor", is about Philip who has a dark secret. He has been visited by his estranged wife and we learn that she has been unfaithful while he was in the Army. She jeers at him and he is roused to revenge, strangling her while a gramophone plays These Foolish Things. The theatre party to which he belongs is on the train, en route to Canada. Also on board is a costume hamper containing the body of his wife. He is hoping to get rid of it on the transatlantic crossing but detectives have been tracking him and are on the train.

The second story, "The Prisoner-of-War", is about Richard and Ella. He is a prisoner of war on the run who does not wish to return to Germany. They have hitherto endured a miserable secret life in assorted seedy lodgings and Ella is hoping they can start again abroad. However, she has stolen money from her landlady to pay her fare and there is only enough for one of them to emigrate. Selflessly, she intends it be him.

The third story, "The Composer", is about composer Raymond Hillary who is travelling to a performance with his star pianist, the temperamental Irina, and other musicians. Although married he has had a string of dalliances, Irina being the latest.

The fourth story, "The Engine Driver", is centred on engine driver Jim Hardcastle. He is facing his own crisis: he is a candidate for a management job at the locomotive sheds. Getting the job would take him off the footplate and allow him to work office hours, the heartfelt wish of his wife Emily. However, to cover for his daughter's future husband who was accidentally knocked out when Jim and his mate were trying to stop him resigning, then put into a fish wagon to come round which was hitched to a loco that ends up in Macclesfield, Jim covers for him by working his shift and, if this were to come to light, it could cost him the promotion.

The film returns to the train, roaring through the night. Again we see the light by the track and the tanker just ahead, but this time also the collision. The derailed and damaged train lies in ruins. Jim Hardcastle groggily recovers consciousness in a pile of coal from the overturned tender, as shocked passengers wander about. One of them is Richard, but his Ella is badly injured and on a stretcher; she dies before she can be taken away and Richard runs from the scene and the attending police, unaware of the steamship ticket in Ella's handbag, which blows away. Philip seems unhurt and makes a dash for freedom, but as he tries to evade the detectives he runs dangerously close to the wreckage and an unstable coach collapses upon him. Irina and Raymond are only bruised and their music company is able to continue, albeit in bandages. There is a happy ending for driver Jim. The final scene shows him waving goodbye to his wife as he prepares to cycle across to the locomotive sheds on the first day of his new job.

== Cast ==
"The Engine Driver" (directed by Sidney Cole)

- Jack Warner as Jim Hardcastle
- Gladys Henson as Mrs. Hardcastle
- Susan Shaw as Doris Hardcastle
- Patric Doonan as Ron Stacey
- Philip Dale as Hardcastle's fireman
- Miles Malleson as Johnson, the timekeeper
- Leslie Phillips as Stacey's fireman
- Percy Walsh as District Superintendent
- Will Ambro as Lancashire railwayman

"The Prisoner-of-War" (directed by Basil Dearden)

- Joan Dowling as Ella
- Laurence Payne as Richard
- Olga Lindo as Mrs. Bailey
- Denis Webb as clerk at shipping office

"The Composer" (directed by Charles Crichton)

- Valerie Hobson as Stella
- John Clements as Raymond Hillary
- Irina Baronova as Irina Norozova
- John Gregson as Malcolm Murray-Bruce
- Gwen Cherrell as Charmian
- Jacqueline Byrne as television announcer
- Neil Arden as the compere
- Thelma Grigg as the harpist

"The Actor" (directed by Basil Dearden)

- Peter Finch as Philip Mason
- Mary Morris as Louise
- Laurence Naismith as Joe Hunt
- Doris Yorke as Mrs. Hunt
- Michael Hordern as first plain clothes man
- Charles Morgan as second plain clothes man
- Mark Dignam as Bolingbroke
- Guy Verney as the producer
- Philip Ashley as actor
- Bryan Coleman as actor
- Henry Hewitt as actor
- Lyndon Brook as actor

== Production ==
Jack Warner was permanently injured while making this film. He had insisted on learning how a steam engine is driven to get his posture right, but slipped on a patch of oil and fell into a locomotive turntable pit and injured his back. As a result, he had a slight limp which remained with him ever afterwards and became noticeably worse as he aged.

A quirk of the film is that one of the digits on the smokebox number plate of a locomotive featured in one of the early scenes is painted out (presumably to avoid worrying passengers who might fear that it really would be involved in an accident), but is still clearly readable because the numbers themselves were made from raised metal.

The locomotives used in the film included two LMS Class 3F "Jinty" 0-6-0Ts Nos. 47327 and 47675, and LMS Royal Scot Class No. 46126 Royal Army Service Corps, though at the time this film was being made, it was in its rebuilt condition from 1943. One of these engines 47327 survives and is based on the Midland Railway in Butterley.

== Critical reception ==
The Monthly Film Bulletin wrote: "This new 'portmanteau' film from Ealing Studios – stories of three separate groups of people travelling on an express from Euston to Liverpool – is far less successful than their earlier Dead of Night [1945]. The episodes are loosely held together by a fourth story, which presents scenes in the life of an engine driver (Jack Warner), his wife and family, cut-to-pattern semi-Huggett cockneys. Moods are dutifully varied – melodrama of a hysterical young actor who strangles his unfaithful wife, ritzy comedy of a philandering composer-conductor unable to choose between his wife and a concert pianist, tragedy of an orphaned girl in love with an escaped German P.o.W. – but the dialogue and characterisation lack feeling, wit and authenticity. While the comedy sequence is merely a facetious attempt at the sophisticated manner, the other two are novelettes, stagily conceived and handled. Once all the characters are aboard the train, a crash provides the inevitable climax and arbitrary solutions. There are three directors, stiff, bloodless, highly conscientious, their styles indistinguishable except for Dearden's pronounced use of melodramatic angles. One performance, that of Mary Morris as the actor's wife, gives a momentary breath of life to a disappointingly artificial film."

Kine Weekly wrote: "Composite melodrama, hinging on a railway crash. It's made up of four complete stories and each, extremely well acted, staged and directed, subtly heightens the other without becoming detached from the main thread. Amusing, moving, heart-warming and thrilling, the veritable library of popular fiction carries wide appeal. ... The magazine type of film is seldom a commercial success, but one of the few exceptions was Ealing's Dead of Night. This, from the same stable, shapes like another. By skilfully intertwining its four stories it enables comedy, drama and tragedy to travel hand in hand without loss of continuity. Each episode is good of its kind and all, whether serious or satirical, have the popular touch. The direction, like the acting, is uniformly good, but if we had to single out a director for special mention it would be Sidney Cole for his showmanlike handling of the train crash sequences. Of the more intimate scenes, the death of Ella is a little gem. Smart and natural dialogue is another of the film's many conspicuous attributes."

The Times said: "The contrivance at best is clumsy, and there are not any inherent virtues in Train of Events to compensate for the inevitable distraction and division of attention."

The Radio Times Guide to Films gave the film 3/5 stars, writing: "As the night express from Euston to Liverpool is about to career off the rails, the movie also lurches into flashback, showing why various passengers were making the fated journey. There's the engine driver; a philandering orchestra conductor; an actor who's killed his wife; and a girl in love with an escaped German PoW. This portmanteau effort is inevitably uneven, though the cast of stalwarts is worth watching."

In British Sound Films: The Studio Years 1928–1959 David Quinlan rated the film as "average", writing: "Not one of the better British portmanteau films."

Leslie Halliwell said: "A rather mechanical entertainment, proficiently made."
