= Esma Cannon =

Australian actress (1905–1972)

- In The Spy in Black (1939)
- Born: Esma Ellen Charlotte Cannon; 27 December 1905; Randwick, New South Wales, Australia
- Died: 18 October 1972 (aged 66); Saint-Benoît-la-Forêt, Indre-et-Loire, France.
- Occupations: Actress and comedienne
- Years active: 1937–1964
- Spouse(s): Ernst Littmann (1945–1972, 27 years); one child

Esma Ellen Charlotte Littmann (née Cannon; 27 December 1905 – 18 October 1972), credited as Esme or Esma Cannon, was an Australian-born character actress who moved to Britain in the early 1930s. Although she frequently appeared on television in her later years, Cannon is best remembered as a film actress, with a lengthy career in British productions from the 1930s to the 1960s.

== Career ==
After early experience at Minnie Everett's School of Dancing in Sydney, Cannon began acting on the stage at the age of four in Madama Butterfly. She appeared in productions for both the J. C. Williamson and Tait companies – including the early prominent role of Ruth Le Page in Sealed Orders at the Theatre Royal in 1914, and played "Baby" in an adaptation of Seven Little Australians the same year.

She was noticeably short in stature at 4 feet 9 inches (145 cm), and was given children's parts well into adulthood. In an interview with the Australian Women's Weekly published in 1963, she claimed it was the theatrical impresario Percy Hutchinson who told her if she visited London he would give her work.

She went to London with her mother in about 1929, and worked in several of Hutchinson's productions. Her first London role was in the play Misadventure. She made her West End debut in 1935 in All Rights Reserved. She worked not only as an actress but also in stage management and production.

Her film début was an uncredited part in The Man Behind the Mask (1936). She was first credited, as Polly Shepherd, in The Last Adventurers (1937), and appeared in 64 films over the next 26 years, usually in roles as a maid or waitress. She had small parts in three early Powell and Pressburger films: The Spy in Black (1939), Contraband (1940) and A Canterbury Tale (1944). Apart from her usual comedic roles, she gave two dramatic performances, the first in Holiday Camp (1947), playing a pathetic spinster who is lured to her death as a murder victim, and the other as a girl struck dumb by terror, alongside Margaret Lockwood in Jassy (also 1947).

According to film historian Robert Ross, "whenever British film-makers needed a fussy, bewildered or dithering little old maid, the call would inevitably go out to Esma Cannon. She specialised in female companions, telephone exchange operators, shop assistants and landladies, usually cockney, who could pop in for a scene or two, lift the spirit of the audiences, and hastily vanish again. She was one of the smallest funny-bones practitioners in the business...".

Towards the end of her career, she appeared in Inn for Trouble (1960), Doctor in Love (1960), Raising the Wind (1961), What a Carve Up! (1961), Over the Odds (1961), We Joined the Navy (1962), On the Beat (1962), Nurse on Wheels (1963) and Hide and Seek (1964). She was cast as Edie Hornett opposite Peggy Mount in the comedy Sailor Beware! (1956). She played "Brother" Lil in the British television comedy series The Rag Trade (1961–62), and also appeared in four Carry On films: Carry On Constable (1960), Carry On Regardless (1961), Carry On Cruising (1962) and Carry On Cabby (1963).

She disliked the attention brought to her by successful television roles and retired from public life in the mid-1960s, living in her home in France.

== Personal life ==
Cannon married Ernst Littmann (1904–1983) in London in 1945 and had a son, Michael Anthony, born in 1946. They remained married until her death in 1972. Cannon, whose first name sometimes appears incorrectly as "Esme", retired in 1964 after Hide and Seek. She died in 1972 at the age of 66 and is buried at Saint-Benoît-la-Forêt in France. Her elusiveness was such that her former colleagues and friends discovered she had died only after a "Where are They Now?" feature appeared in Films and Filming a number of years after her death.

She was played by the actress Marcia Warren in the 2011 TV play Hattie, a drama based on the career of Hattie Jacques. The play featured a number of scenes with the two actresses on the set of Carry On Cabby (her penultimate role) with Cannon characterised as being disenchanted with acting and proposing leaving show business.

== Selected filmography ==
- The Man Behind the Mask (1936) – Waitress (uncredited)
- The Five Pound Man (1937) – Lucy
- Cotton Queen (1937) – Telephonist (uncredited)
- The Last Adventurers (1937) – Polly Shepherd
- I See Ice (1938) – Bride (uncredited)
- It's in the Air (1938) – Sir Philip's Maid (uncredited)
- Trouble Brewing (1939) – Maid (uncredited)
- The Nursemaid Who Disappeared (1939) – Mary – Nursemaid (uncredited)
- I Met a Murderer (1939) – Blonde Camper
- The Spy in Black (1939) – Maggie (uncredited)
- Poison Pen (1939) – Mrs Warren
- Contraband (1940) – Erik Skold's Niece (uncredited)
- The Briggs Family (1940) – Myrtle
- Quiet Wedding (1941) – (uncredited)
- Asking for Trouble (1942) – Ada
- The Young Mr. Pitt (1942) – Servant at Lord Auckland's (uncredited)
- It's in the Bag (1944) – Commandant W.T.C. (uncredited)
- Fanny by Gaslight (1944) – Maid (uncredited)
- A Canterbury Tale (1944) – Agnes
- The Way Ahead (1944) – Mrs. Brewer
- English Without Tears (1944) – Queenie
- Don't Take It to Heart (1944) – Maid
- The Years Between (1946) – Effie
- Holiday Camp (1947) – Elsie Dawson
- Jassy (1947) – Lindy Wicks
- Here Come the Huggetts (1948) – Youth Leader
- Vote for Huggett (1949) – Bit Role (uncredited)
- The Huggetts Abroad (1949) – Miss Hawker, Brown Owl
- Fools Rush In (1949) – Mrs. Atkins
- Marry Me! (1949) – Pleasant Little Woman (uncredited)
- Helter Skelter (1949) – Autograph Huntress (uncredited)
- Guilt Is My Shadow (1950) – Peggy
- Double Confession (1950) – Madam Cleo
- Last Holiday (1950) – Miss Fox
- Crow Hollow (1952) – Aunt Judith
- Noose for a Lady (1953) – Miss Ginch
- The Steel Key (1953) – Patient in Doctor's Waiting Room
- Trouble in Store (1953) – Lady Customer In Park Cafe (uncredited)
- The Sleeping Tiger (1954) – Cleaner with ladder
- Out of the Clouds (1955) – Her Companion
- Simon and Laura (1955) – Laura from Newcastle
- Sailor Beware! (1956) – Edie Hornett
- Three Men in a Boat (1956) – Meek Woman (Maze)
- A Touch of the Sun (1956) Miss Tickle
- Further Up the Creek (1958) – Maudie Lovelace
- Jack the Ripper (1959) – Nelly the Woman at Police Station
- I'm All Right Jack (1959) – Spencer
- Expresso Bongo (1959) – Night Club Cleaner (uncredited)
- Inn for Trouble (1960) – Dolly
- The Flesh and the Fiends (1960) – Aggie
- Carry On Constable (1960) – Deaf Old Lady
- Doctor in Love (1960) – Rafia Woman (uncredited)
- No Kidding (1960) – District Nurse
- Carry On Regardless (1961) – Miss Cooling
- Raising the Wind (1961) – Mrs. Deevens
- What a Carve Up! (1961) – Aunt Emily
- Over the Odds (1961) – Alice
- Carry On Cruising (1962) – Bridget Madderley
- In the Doghouse (1962) – Mrs. Raikes
- We Joined the Navy (1962) – Consul's Wife
- The Fast Lady (1962) – Lady on Zebra Crossing
- On the Beat (1962) – Mrs. Timms
- Nurse on Wheels (1963) – Mrs. Jones
- Carry On Cabby (1963) – Flo Sims
- Hide and Seek (1964) – Tea Lady (final film role)
