= Our Mutual Friend (1976 serial) =

- Opening title
- Genre: Historical drama
- Based on: Our Mutual Friend by Charles Dickens
- Written by: Julia Jones; Donald Churchill
- Directed by: Peter Hammond
- Starring: Jane Seymour; Leo McKern; Jack Wild
- Composer: Carl Davis
- Country of origin: United Kingdom
- Original language: English
- No. of series: 1
- No. of episodes: 7

Production
- Producer: Martin Lisemore
- Running time: 50 min.
- Production company: BBC

Original release
- Network: BBC Two
- Release: 1 March – 12 April 1976

Our Mutual Friend is a 1976 British television serial adapted from Charles Dickens' 1865 novel Our Mutual Friend. The series was made by the BBC and ran during 1976 for a total of seven episodes. It was directed by Peter Hammond.

The adaptation was by Julia Jones and Donald Churchill, who had written the ITV sitcom Moody and Pegg (1974–75). Their version excludes some minor characters in order to convey the action within the limitations of a seven-episode structure, but was praised by British reviewers for faithfully reproducing the mood and atmosphere of the original novel.

== Cast and characters ==
Actor/Actress	Role
John McEnery	John Rokesmith
Jane Seymour	Miss Bella Wilfer
Nicholas Jones	Eugene Wrayburn
John Collin	'Rogue' Riderhood
Leo McKern	Nicodemus Boffin
Lesley Dunlop	Lizzie Hexam
Andrew Ray	Mortimer Lightwood
Kathleen Harrison	Mrs Henrietta Boffin
Ray Mort	Reginald Wilfer
Polly James	Jenny Wren
Warren Clarke	Bradley Headstone
David Troughton	Sloppy
Patricia Lawrence	Mrs Wilfer
Edmond Bennett	Mr Dolls
Richard Stilgoe	Mr Boots
John Savident	Mr Podsnap
Jack Wild	Charley Hexam
Alfie Bass	Silas Wegg
Ronald Lacey	Mr Venus

== Theme music ==
The theme music was composed by Carl Davis.

== Critical reception ==
The stage-style filming of the serial was criticised, but a number of performances were singled out for praise, including those of Polly James as Jenny Wren and Jack Wild as Charley Hexam.
