= The Huggetts Abroad =

1949 British film

- Directed by: Ken Annakin
- Written by: Gerard Bryant; Ted Willis
- Story by: Keith Campbell
- Produced by: Betty E. Box
- Starring: Jack Warner; Kathleen Harrison; Susan Shaw; Petula Clark; Dinah Sheridan; Hugh McDermott; Jimmy Hanley; Peter Hammond
- Cinematography: Reginald H. Wyer
- Edited by: Gordon Hales
- Music by: Antony Hopkins
- Production company: Gainsborough Pictures
- Distributed by: General Film Distributors
- Release date: May 1949
- Running time: 89 mins
- Country: United Kingdom
- Language: English
- Box office: £113,000 (by 1953)

The Huggetts Abroad is a 1949 British comedy drama film directed by Ken Annakin and starring Jack Warner, Kathleen Harrison, Petula Clark and Susan Shaw. It was written by Gerard Bryant and Ted Willis from a story by Keith Campbell. It was the fourth and final film in The Huggetts series.

== Plot ==
After Joe Huggett loses his job, the family decide to emigrate to South Africa, travelling via a land route that takes them across Africa. On their journey they become entangled with a diamond smuggler. Their truck breaks down in the desert and Joe and his son-in-law Jimmy Gardner have to trek across the sand to find help for the family.

== Cast ==
- Jack Warner as Joe Huggett
- Kathleen Harrison as Ethel Huggett
- Susan Shaw as Susan Huggett
- Petula Clark as Pet Huggett
- Dinah Sheridan as Jane Huggett
- Hugh McDermott as Bob McCoy
- Jimmy Hanley as Jimmy Gardner
- Peter Hammond as Peter Hawtrey
- John Blythe as Gowan
- Amy Veness as Grandma Huggett
- Peter Illing as Algerian Detective
- Frith Banbury as French Doctor
- Olaf Pooley as Straker
- Esma Cannon as Brown Owl
- Sheila Raynor as Woman with Straker

== Production ==
In his autobiography Ken Annakin says he was reluctant to make The Huggett films, wanting to work on more ambitious material, but did it as a favour to Sydney Box, head of Gainsborough Pictures, and that he enjoyed working with the cast.

Because Jane Hylton was ill her part, Jane Huggett, was played by Dinah Sheridan, who was then married to Jimmy Hanley.

The following statement appears after the opening credits:

The Huggett Family, which made its screen debut in Holiday Camp, appears again in this film. Since the name of the family was chosen it has been brought to our notice that a Mr and Mrs Huggett and their family made a trek across Africa, subsequently returning to England. This film does not relate to Mr and Mrs Vane Huggett and their family and is not in any way based on their experiences. On the contrary, all characters and events are fictitious. Any similarity to actual events, or persons living or dead, is purely coincidental.

== Critical response ==
In a contemporary review, Kine Weekly wrote: "Domestic comedy drama, the latest addition and easily the most colourful of the deservedly popular Huggett series. ... The laughs are consistent, but the artfulness of the film lies in its friendly and extravagant fooling."

In British Sound Films: The Studio Years 1928–1959 David Quinlan rated the film as “average” and wrote: “Just a few smiles in this meandering Huggett film.''

The Radio Times Guide to Films gave the film 1/5 stars, writing: "Having first encountered the Huggetts in Holiday Camp (1947), it's somewhat apt that we should bid them farewell at the end of another sojourn. However, it's with relief not regret that we part company with Jack Warner, Kathleen Harrison et al, as this brief series that began in 1948 with Here Come the Huggetts had clearly run out of steam. Warner chucks his job and hauls the family off to South Africa. Unfunny and very dull."
