= Gladys Henson =

Irish actress (1897–1982)

Gladys Henson

Gladys Hilda Barbara Kate Henson (née Gunn; 27 September 1897 – 21 December 1982) was an Irish actress whose career lasted from 1932 to 1976 and included roles on stage, radio, films and television series. Among her most notable films were The History of Mr Polly (1949) and The Blue Lamp (1950).

== Life and career ==
Henson was born at 4 St Stephen's Green, Dublin, Ireland, the daughter of John Gunn, the director of the Gaiety Theatre, and Hilda Killock.

She married English actor Leslie Henson in 1926. In 1932, she appeared in the premiere of Noël Coward's Design for Living on Broadway, appearing in several other London and Broadway shows, including Coward's Set to Music (1939). After her divorce from Henson, she appeared in numerous well-known post-war films, often alongside Jack Warner, whose wife she played in Train of Events, The Captive Heart and The Blue Lamp; the scene in the latter in which her character learns of her husband's death has been described as "a masterpiece of understated emotion, moving without falling into sentimentality."

She died in London on 21 December 1982 aged 85.

== Partial filmography ==
Notable films and television programmes in which Henson appeared:

- The Demi-Paradise (1943) - Mrs. Frost (uncredited)
- The Captive Heart (1946) - Flo Horsfall
- Temptation Harbour (1947) - Mrs Titmuss
- Frieda (1947) - Edith
- It Always Rains on Sunday (1947) - Mrs Neesley
- Counterblast (1948) - Mrs. Plum - Forester's Housekeeper
- London Belongs to Me (1948) - Mrs Boon
- The Weaker Sex (1948) - Woman in Fish Queue (uncredited)
- The History of Mr. Polly (1949) - Aunt Larkins
- Train of Events (1949) - Mrs. Hardcastle (segment "The Engine Driver")
- The Cure for Love (1949) - Mrs. Jenkins
- The Blue Lamp (1950) - Mrs Dixon
- The Happiest Days of Your Life (1950) - Mrs Hampstead
- Dance Hall (1950) - Mrs Wilson
- Cage of Gold (1950) - Waddy
- The Magnet (1950) - Nanny
- Highly Dangerous (1950) - Snack Bar Attendant
- Happy Go Lovely (1951) - Mrs. Urquhart
- Lady Godiva Rides Again (1951) - Mrs. Clark
- I Believe in You (1952) - Mrs Stevens
- Derby Day (1952) - Gladys Jenkins
- Those People Next Door (1953) - Emma Higgins
- Meet Mr. Lucifer (1953) - Lady in Bus
- The Cockleshell Heroes (1955) - Barmaid
- Stars in Your Eyes (1956) - (uncredited)
- Doctor at Large (1957) - Mrs. Wilkins
- The Prince and the Showgirl (1957) - Dresser
- Night Must Fall (1957, TV Series) - Mrs. Terence
- Davy (1958) - Beatrice, Tea Lady
- A Night to Remember (1958) - Hysterical woman (uncredited)
- The Trials of Oscar Wilde (1960) - Mrs. Burgess
- Clue of the Twisted Candle (1960) - Landlady
- Edgar Wallace Mysteries (1960-1962, TV Series) - Housekeeper / Landlady
- No Love for Johnnie (1961) - Mrs. Sarah Arscott - Constituent at Party Meeting
- Double Bunk (1961) - Madame de Sola
- Dangerous Afternoon (1961) - Miss Cassell
- Stork Talk (1962) - Matron
- Death Trap (1962) - Housekeeper
- The Leather Boys (1964) - Gran
- Go Kart Go (1964) - Housewife
- First Men in the Moon (1964) - Nursing Home Matron
- The Newcomers (1965-1969, TV Series) - Gran Hamilton
- The Legend of Young Dick Turpin (1966, TV Series) - Blind Annie
- Follow Me! (1972) - Old woman weighing dog (uncredited)
- The Bawdy Adventures of Tom Jones (1976) - Mrs. Wilkins (final film role)
