= Patric Doonan =

English actor (1926–1958)

- Born: George William Doonan; 18 April 1926; Derby, Derbyshire, England
- Died: 10 March 1958 (aged 31); London, England
- Cause of death: Suicide
- Occupation: Actor
- Years active: 1944

George William Doonan (18 April 1926 – 10 March 1958) was an English stage and screen actor. He was the son of comedian George Vincent Doonan and Doris Mary (Nee Endsor), and the elder brother of fellow actor, Tony Doonan.

He featured in films of the time such as The Blue Lamp, Train of Events, and The Cockleshell Heroes but rarely played the leads. An exception was Wheel of Fate (1953), in which he did have the leading role and top billing. 1953 was probably Doonan's peak year in films, as in that same year he also had good supporting roles in The Net (1953) and The Red Beret (1953).

He played Detective Sergeant Trotter in The Mousetrap at the Ambassadors Theatre in London for three and a half years.

He committed suicide at the age of 31 by coal gas poisoning (carbon monoxide poisoning) in 1958 at his home in Margaretta Terrace, Chelsea. At the time he was engaged to marry actress Ann Firbank, despite the fact that he was already married to actress Aud Johansen.

In 1994 the singer Morrissey referred to Doonan in the song 'Now My Heart Is Full'.

== Filmography ==
Year	Title	Role	Notes
1944	Henry V	Minor Role	Uncredited
1944	Dreaming (1944 British film)	Minor Role	Uncredited
1948	Once a Jolly Swagman	Dick	
1949	All Over the Town	Burton	
1949	Train of Events	Ron Stacey	(segment "The Engine Driver")
1949	A Run for Your Money	Conductor	Uncredited
1950	The Blue Lamp	Spud	
1950	Blackout	Chalky	
1950	Highly Dangerous	Customs officer	
1951	Captain Horatio Hornblower	Seaman	Uncredited
1951	The Lavender Hill Mob	Craggs	Uncredited
1951	Calling Bulldog Drummond	Alec	
1951	The Man in the White Suit	Frank	
1951	Appointment with Venus	Sgt. Forbes	
1951	High Treason	George Ellis	
1952	I'm a Stranger	George Westcott	
1952	Gift Horse	Petty Officer Martin	
1952	The Gentle Gunman	Sentry	Uncredited
1953	The Net	Brian Jackson	
1953	Wheel of Fate	Johnny Burrows	
1953	The Red Beret	Flash	
1954	What Every Woman Wants	Mark	
1954	Crest of the Wave	Petty Officer Herbert	
1955	John and Julie	Jim Webber	
1955	The Cockleshell Heroes	Claridge - Sailor in Pub	
