= Henrietta Lister =

British watercolourist, dancer, and race driver

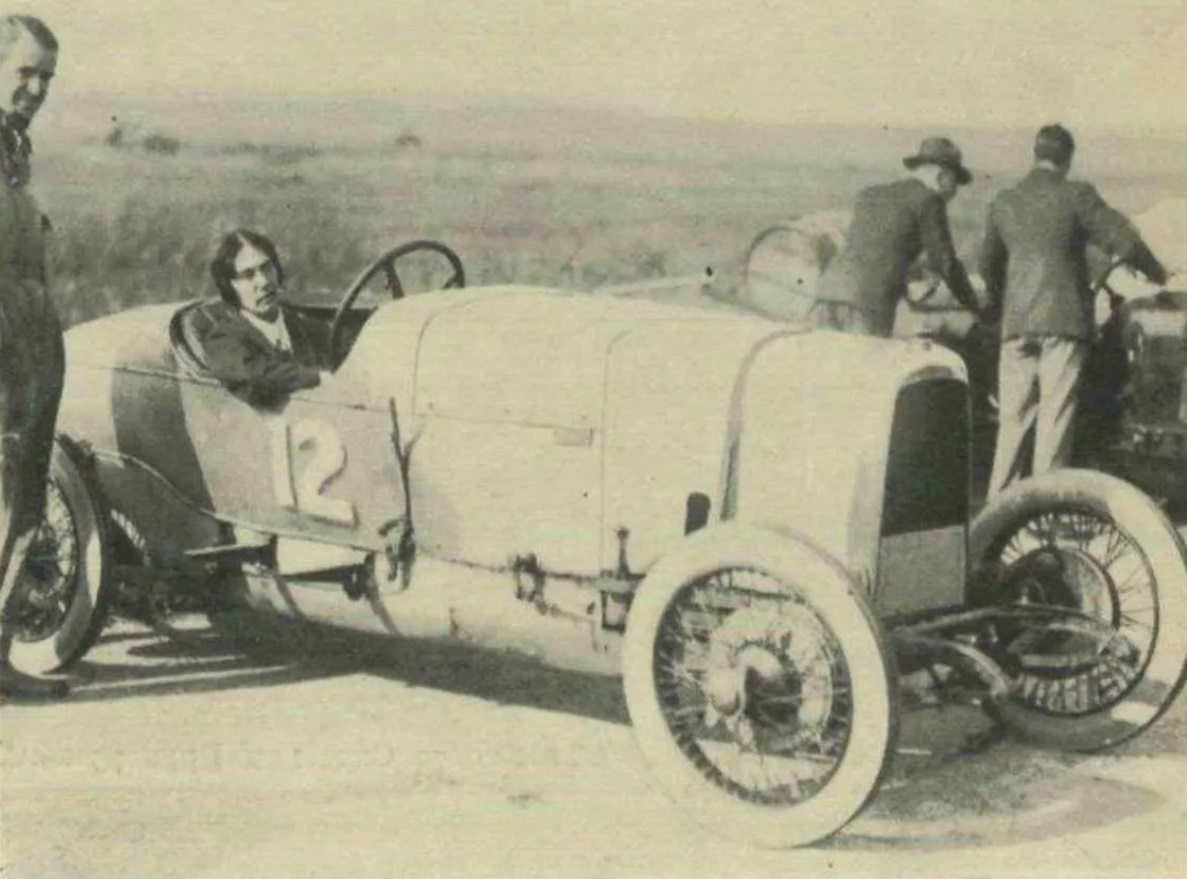
- Lister in her Aston Martin c. 1925
- Born: 1895
- Died: 1959 (aged 64)
- Other names: Laretta Listakova; Henrietta Listakova; H. M. Burrill-Robinson
- Occupations: Artist, dancer, driver

Henrietta Mabel Lister (also known as Laretta Listakova, Henrietta Listakova and H. M. Burrill-Robinson; 1895–1959) was a British watercolourist, dancer, and race driver.

== Early life ==
Lister was born in 1895 and her parents were Charles Lister (a doctor) and his wife. She attended the Slade School of Fine Art at University College London.

In 1914, Lister, using the stage name Laretta Listakova, was part of a dance company that was touring Bulgaria and Serbia when World War I began. Lister joined Elsie Inglis's Salonika-based Scottish Women's Hospitals unit as a driver, under the auspices of the French Red Cross. For her contributions, she was awarded a British War Medal and Victory Medal, and a Serbian Medal for Zeal.

== Motor racing ==
Between 1924 and 1928, Lister raced a Bamford-type Aston Martin at the Brooklands racetrack in Surrey. She is recorded as having participated in twelve meetings, competing in 22 different races or events. Jack Waters (who went on to star in films and television as Jack Warner) acted as her mechanic and sometimes drove her car.

Some sources report that she sometimes called herself "Henrietta Listakova", whom newspapers reported as being a "Russian ballet dancer" who raced cars in Britain and America. In 1923, Listakova performed in a charity ballet organized by a Mabel Lister in London.

== Later life ==
In 1935, Lister married William Robinson Burrill-Robinson of Elm House, Redmire, North Yorkshire. Lister appears to have given up her adventurous hobbies and turned to watercolours, exhibiting as part of the Castle Bolton Group.

Lister died in 1959 at the age of 64.
