= Over the Odds =

1961 British film by Michael Forlong

- Directed by: Michael Forlong
- Written by: Ernest Player; Rex Arundel
- Produced by: Alec Snowden
- Starring: Frances Cuka; Marjorie Rhodes; Glenn Melvyn; Cyril Smith; Esma Cannon
- Cinematography: Norman Warwick
- Edited by: Reginald Beck
- Production company: Jermyn Films
- Distributed by: Rank Film Distributors
- Release date: November 1961
- Running time: 65 minutes
- Country: United Kingdom
- Language: English

Over the Odds is a 1961 British comedy film directed by Michael Forlong and starring Marjorie Rhodes, Glenn Melvyn, Cyril Smith, Esma Cannon, Thora Hird and Wilfrid Lawson. The screenplay was by Ernest Player and Rex Arundel, based on a play by Arundel. A bookmaker struggles to cope with his two mothers-in-law.

== Cast ==
- Marjorie Rhodes as Bridget Stone
- Glenn Melvyn as George Summers
- Cyril Smith as Sam
- Esma Cannon as Alice
- Thora Hird as Mrs Carter
- Wilfrid Lawson as Willie Summers
- Frances Cuka as Hilda Summers
- Gwen Lewis as Mrs Small
- Rex Deering as butcher
- Patsy Rowlands as Marilyn
- Fred Griffiths as fruit vendor
- Leslie Crowther as fishmonger

== Reception ==
The Monthly Film Bulletin wrote: "A noisy, feeble farce which exploits the old mother-in-law theme twofold, with Marjorie Rhodes as number one, solid and belligerent, and Thora Hird as number two, violently vocal. Glenn Melvyn and Cyril Smith battle with ingenuous, obvious material, but Wilfrid Lawson comes off the best in a characteristic performance as the drunken father."

Kine Weekly wrote: "The picture opens promisingly, but before it gets very far all the old clichés are trotted out and practically every laugh is signalled. Marjorie Rhodes and Thora Hird never let up as the violently vocal Bridget and Mrs. Carter, and Glenn Melvyn occasionally amuses as George. Frances Cuka, Cyril Smith, Wilfrid Lawson and Esma Cannon also seize their opportunities. A few gags are indestructible and these, plus commendable economy of footage give the farce, to use racing parlance, an outside chance. Incidentally, the biggest joke is the A certificate. Whatever for?"

Variety wrote: "Over the Odds is an unpretentious, slapstick comedy which aims to be nothing more than a nice stooge to a top film. And within its modest limits, this fills that bill. It shows signs of the script having been frimmed down remorselessly so that many scenes and characters have not been developed to full yock-potential, but it contains a plentiful quota of unsophisticated laughs. ... Michael Forlong has directed with straightforward aim. The camera-work is okay and the editing, though occasionally jerky, keeps the film moving within the confined limits of ifs small framework."

Filmink called it "a cheap independent comedy that made little noise."
