= Hobson's Choice (1931 film) =

1931 film directed by Thomas Bentley

- Directed by: Thomas Bentley
- Written by: Frank Launder
- Based on: Hobson's Choice; 1915 play by Harold Brighouse
- Produced by: John Maxwell
- Starring: James Harcourt; Viola Lyel; Frank Pettingell
- Cinematography: Walter J. Harvey
- Production company: British International Pictures
- Distributed by: Wardour Films
- Release date: 2 October 1931
- Running time: 65 minutes
- Country: United Kingdom
- Language: English

Hobson's Choice is a 1931 lost British comedy drama film directed by Thomas Bentley and starring James Harcourt, Viola Lyel, Frank Pettingell and Herbert Lomas. Written by Frank Launder based on the 1915 play Hobson's Choice by Harold Brighouse, it follows the tale of a coarse bootshop owner who becomes outraged when his eldest daughter decides to marry a meek cobbler. It was produced by British International Pictures at their studios in Elstree.

An earlier silent film version of the play had been released in 1920. A sound version dates from 1956.

== Preservation status ==
The British Film Institute has classed Hobson's Choice as a lost film, included in its "75 Most Wanted" list. Its National Archive holds a collection of stills but no film or video materials.

== Plot ==
In Salford, tyrannical widower Hobson runs a thriving boot shop with the help of his three daughters. Trouble starts when the eldest, Maggie, defies her father’s authority by selecting Will Mossop, his most talented craftsman, as her husband.

When Will and Maggie leave to start their own shop, Maggie’s independent spirit soon spreads to her two younger sisters, who launch their own rebellions, driving a defeated Hobson to drink.

Determined to resolve the family crisis, Maggie hatches a plan. She convinces a doctor to exaggerate the severity of her father's health, leading Hobson to believe he is at death's door and requiriring Maggie's constant care. He surrenders to her demands, which include bringing Will into the shop as an equal partner.

== Cast ==
- James Harcourt as Hobson
- Viola Lyel as Maggie Hobson
- Frank Pettingell as Will Mossop
- Belle Chrystall as Vicky Hobson
- Jay Laurier as Tubby Wadlow
- Joan Maude as Alice Hobson
- Amy Veness as Mrs. Hepworth
- Reginald Bach as Albert Prosser
- Basil Moss as Freddy Beenstock
- Herbert Lomas as Jim Heeler
- Kathleen Harrison as Ada Figgins

== Reception ==
Film Weekly wrote: "Lancashire in the Victorian Era, with its cobbled streets, its quaint ehops, its corner 'pubs,' and its shrewd natives are in on the screen with a pleasing realism and a keen sense of humour in this effective British picture. ... This homely domestic strife is worked out with many a touch of amusing comedy that will win most audiences in a very few moments. Add to this really capable acting from Viola Lyel as Maggie, James Harcourt as Hobson, and Frank Pettingell as the timid lover but efficient cobbler, and vou have a charming comedy as English as you may wish for, and entertaining into the bargain."

The Daily Film Renter wrote: "Period comedy of Lancashire life, semi-dialect, but understandable in any district. Good atmosphere and plenty of humorous situations; excellent direction, characterisation and acting; dialogue, from the play, excellent. Good comedy booking anywhere."

Kine Weekly wrote: "Harold Brighouse's comedy of Lancashire life makes very good popular entertainment in its screen form; moreover, it is excellently acted by the principal artistes. There is human sentiment under the broad humour and characterisations which one feels have their living counterparts. The early Victorian atmosphere – that is the period in which the action takes place – is well maintained and presented."

Variety wrote: "Alleged comedy in the Victorian manner, much play being made on 1890 lingerie and things. Drab and barren in its lower class settings. Limited to smaller theatres. Play on which it is based was a big success in its day, but the only thing in its favor now is its short footage, a pleasure after the eight and nine-reel British efforts usually released."

Picturegoer wrote: "Not only is the Victorian atmosphere well suggested, but the characters are excellently drawn and well interpreted by a strong cast. Only in the opening has Thomas Bentley rather overdone his efforts to get the atmosphere of the Lancashire mill town of the period; he tends here to artificiality. Later the settings are wholly convincing ... Its time-honoured marital humour is tiresome. As a whole, the picture is excellent entertainment, original, and most satisfyingly British in conception."
