= Gordon Hales =

British film maker (1916–1994)

- Born: 1916; Ipswich, Suffolk, England, UK
- Died: 1994 (aged 77–78); London, England, UK
- Occupations: Film editor Film director
- Years active: 1938–1971

Gordon Hales (1916–1994) was a British film editor who worked on more than thirty films, including several documentaries. Early in his career Hales was employed by the GPO Film Unit, which was then taken over by the Ministry of Information during the Second World War. During the late 1940s he worked at Gainsborough Pictures. In 1963 he directed the film noir Return to Sender.

== Selected filmography ==
- The Seventh Veil (1945)
- The Years Between (1946)
- When the Bough Breaks (1947)
- Dear Murderer (1947)
- Miranda (1948)
- Vote for Huggett (1948)
- Daybreak (1948)
- The Blind Goddess (1948)
- Here Come the Huggetts (1948)
- The Huggetts Abroad (1949)
- The Lost People (1949)
- So Long at the Fair (1950)
- The Clouded Yellow (1950)
- The Lady from Boston (1951)
- Another Man's Poison (1951)
- The Long Memory (1953)
- Father Brown (1954)
- The Doctor's Dilemma (1958)

== Bibliography ==
- Drazin, Charles. The Finest Years: British Cinema of the 1940s. I.B.Tauris, 2007.
- Spicer, Andrew. Historical Dictionary of Film Noir. Scarecrow Press, 2010.
