= There's Always a Thursday =

1957 British film by Charles Saunders

- British quad poster
- Directed by: Charles Saunders
- Written by: Brandon Fleming
- Produced by: Guido Coen
- Starring: Charles Victor; Jill Ireland
- Cinematography: Brendan J. Stafford
- Edited by: Tom Simpson
- Music by: Reg Owen; Anthony Spurgin
- Distributed by: Associated Sound Film Industries
- Release date: 1957
- Running time: 60 min
- Country: United Kingdom
- Language: English

There's Always a Thursday (also known as There's Always Thursday) is a 1957 British comedy crime film directed by Charles Saunders and starring Charles Victor, Jill Ireland, Lloyd Lamble and Robert Raglan. It was written by Brandon Fleming.

== Plot ==
A down-trodden clerk finds newfound fame as the director of a racy lingerie firm, after an innocent encounter with a fast woman is misreported and earns him the reputation of a suburban Romeo.

== Cast ==
- Charles Victor as George Potter
- Frances Day as Vera Clandon
- Marjorie Rhodes as Marjorie Potter
- Bruce Seton as James Pelly
- Robert Raglan as Crosby
- Jill Ireland as Jennifer Potter
- Richard Thorp as Dennis Potter
- Lloyd Lamble as Detective Sergeant Bolton
- Patrick Holt as Middleton
- Ewen Solon as Inspector Bradley
- Alex Macintosh as TV Interviewer
- Reginald Hearne as Bannister
- Deidre Mayne as Miss Morton
- Glen Alyn as Mrs. Middleton
- Alexander Field as tramp
- Martin Boddey as sergeant

== Production ==
Much of the film was shot at Southall Studios.

== Critical reception ==
The Monthly Film Bulletin wrote: "A light-hearted, heavy-handed domestic comedy, with the satirical point that the way to success is to acquire an undeserved reputation as a philanderer. Charles Victor and Marjorie Rhodes give amusing 'character' performances, but the rest of the cast, including Frances Day, exhibit no striking aptitude."

TV Guide wrote that a "good performance by Victor and an intelligent script lift this one above the ranks."

The film historians Steve Chibnall and Brian McFarlane wrote: "The film is quite neatly structured but, without the coherence which Victor's sympathetic understanding of the central character gives, it would seem much thinner than it does. Its comedy centres on the drabness of an oppressive domestic situation and, in the flowering of George Potter, what may be lost in unthinking conformity to a routine."
