= The Blue Lamp =

1950 British film by Basil Dearden

- Original UK quad poster by James Boswell
- Directed by: Basil Dearden
- Screenplay by: T.E.B. Clarke
- Based on: Original treatment by Jan Read and Ted Willis
- Produced by: Michael Balcon
- Starring: Jack Warner; Jimmy Hanley; Dirk Bogarde; Robert Flemyng
- Cinematography: Gordon Dines
- Edited by: Peter Tanner
- Music by: Ernest Irving; Jack Parnell (uncredited)
- Production company: Ealing Studios
- Distributed by: General Film Distributors
- Release dates: January 20, 1950 (UK); January 8, 1951 (New York)
- Running time: 85 minutes
- Country: United Kingdom
- Language: English
- Budget: £142,304
- Box office: £246,000

The Blue Lamp is a 1950 British police procedural film directed by Basil Dearden and starring Jack Warner as PC Dixon, Jimmy Hanley as newcomer PC Mitchell and Dirk Bogarde as criminal Tom Riley.

The title refers to the blue lamps that traditionally hang outside British police stations. The film became the inspiration for the 1955–1976 TV series Dixon of Dock Green, in which Warner continued to play PC Dixon until he was 80 years old (even though Dixon is murdered in the original film).

The screenplay was written by Ealing regular T. E. B. Clarke, who had been a war reserve constable. The film is an early example of the social realism films that emerged later in the 1950s and 1960s, sometimes using a partial documentary-style approach. There are also cinematic influences of the film noir genre, particularly in underworld scenes featuring Bogarde, such as the pool rooms and in and around the theatre, making deliberate use of genre trademarks such as slow-moving low camera angles and stark lighting.

== Plot ==
In the Paddington area of west London in July 1949, PC George Dixon, a long-serving traditional policeman who is due to retire shortly, supervises new recruit Andy Mitchell, introducing him to the night beat. Dixon is unprepared when he is called to the scene of a robbery at a local cinema, where he comes face-to-face with Tom Riley, a desperate youth armed with a revolver. Dixon tries to convince Riley to surrender the weapon, but Riley panics and fires. Dixon dies in hospital some hours later.

On his beat, Mitchell finds a little girl playing with the discarded revolver. The child is eventually persuaded to lead police to the spot where she had found it. Police painstakingly drag a canal and find a raincoat that is traced to Diana Lewis's father, who remembers lending it to Riley.

In his arrogance, Riley goes to police headquarters to provide a false alibi for himself. All this accomplishes is to convince the police to place him under 24-hour watch. Riley is caught with the help of professional criminals and dog-track bookmakers, who identify him as he tries to hide in the crowd at White City greyhound track in West London. Credit for arresting Riley falls to young Mitchell.

== Cast ==
- Jack Warner as PC George Dixon
- Jimmy Hanley as PC Andy Mitchell
- Dirk Bogarde as Tom Riley
- Robert Flemyng as Det. Sgt. Roberts
- Bernard Lee as Det. Insp. Cherry
- Peggy Evans as Diana Lewis
- Patric Doonan as Spud
- Bruce Seton as PC Campbell
- Meredith Edwards as PC Hughes
- Clive Morton as Sgt. Brooks
- William Mervyn as Chief Inspector Hammond
- Frederick Piper as Alf Lewis
- Dora Bryan as Maisie
- Gladys Henson as Mrs. Dixon
- Tessie O'Shea as herself
- Sam Kydd as Bookmakers Assistant White City (uncredited)
- Anthony Steel as Police Constable (uncredited)

The ensemble cast also included uncredited actors who later became better known in film, television and radio, including Alma Cogan, Glyn Houston, Jennifer Jayne, Glen Michael, Arthur Mullard, Norman Shelley, Rosemary Nicols (in her film debut as a street urchin) and Campbell Singer.

== Production ==
The character of "Diana" was initially envisioned with Diana Dors in mind, to the extent that the character's name was derived from her own. Nevertheless, the producers harboured reservations about Dors's suitability for the role, citing concerns regarding her emotional maturity. Consequently, a decision was made by the director to pivot away from Dors and opt for a "waif type" persona, leading to the casting of Peggy Evans for the character.

The production had the full co-operation of the Metropolitan Police, and the crew was thus able to use the actual Paddington Green Police Station at 64 Harrow Road, London W9 and New Scotland Yard for location work. Most of the outdoor scenes were filmed in inner west London, mainly the Harrow Road precincts between Paddington and Westbourne Park. George Dixon is named after producer Michael Balcon's former school in Birmingham.

== Locations ==
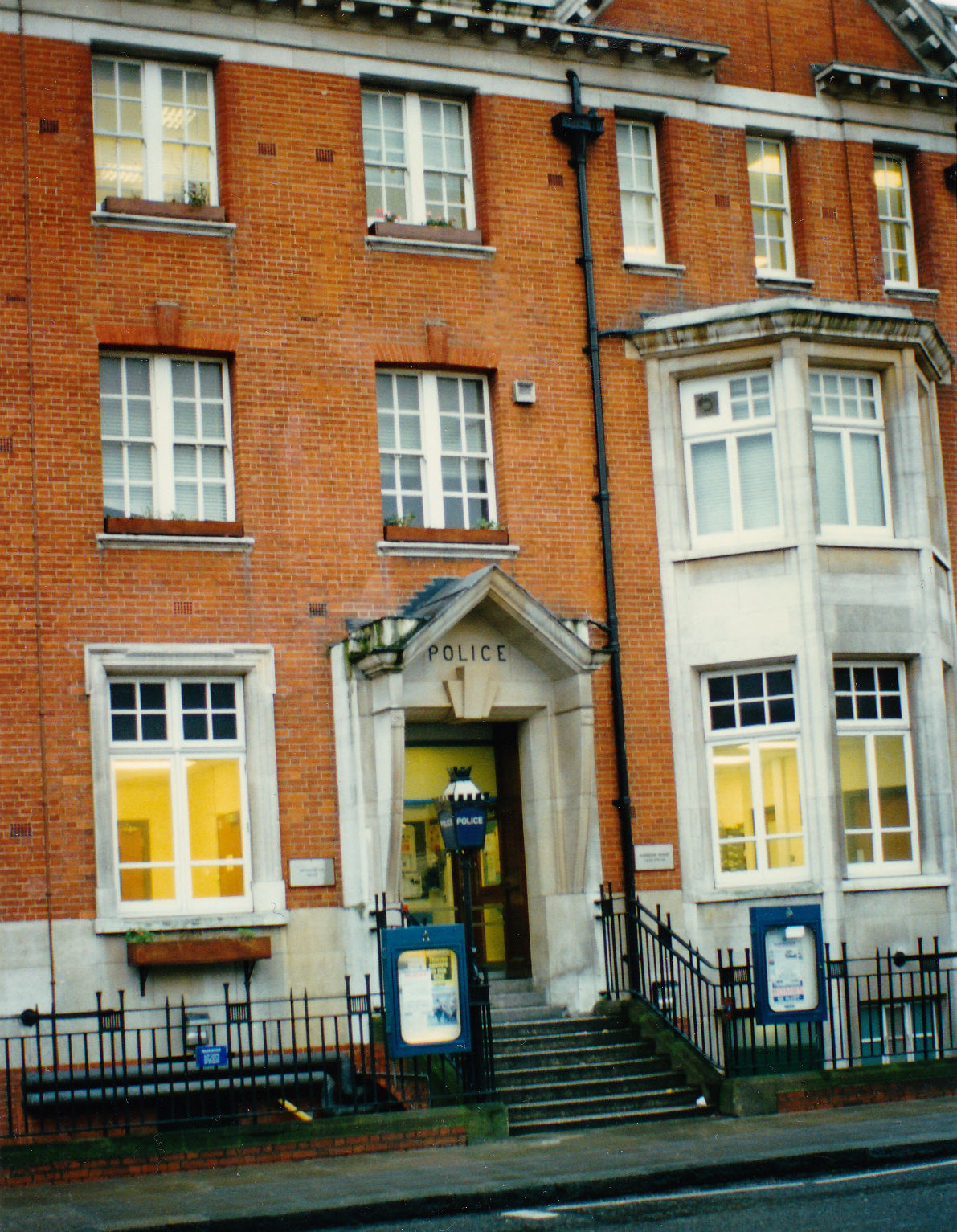
The Harrow Road Police Station, with reproduction blue lamp

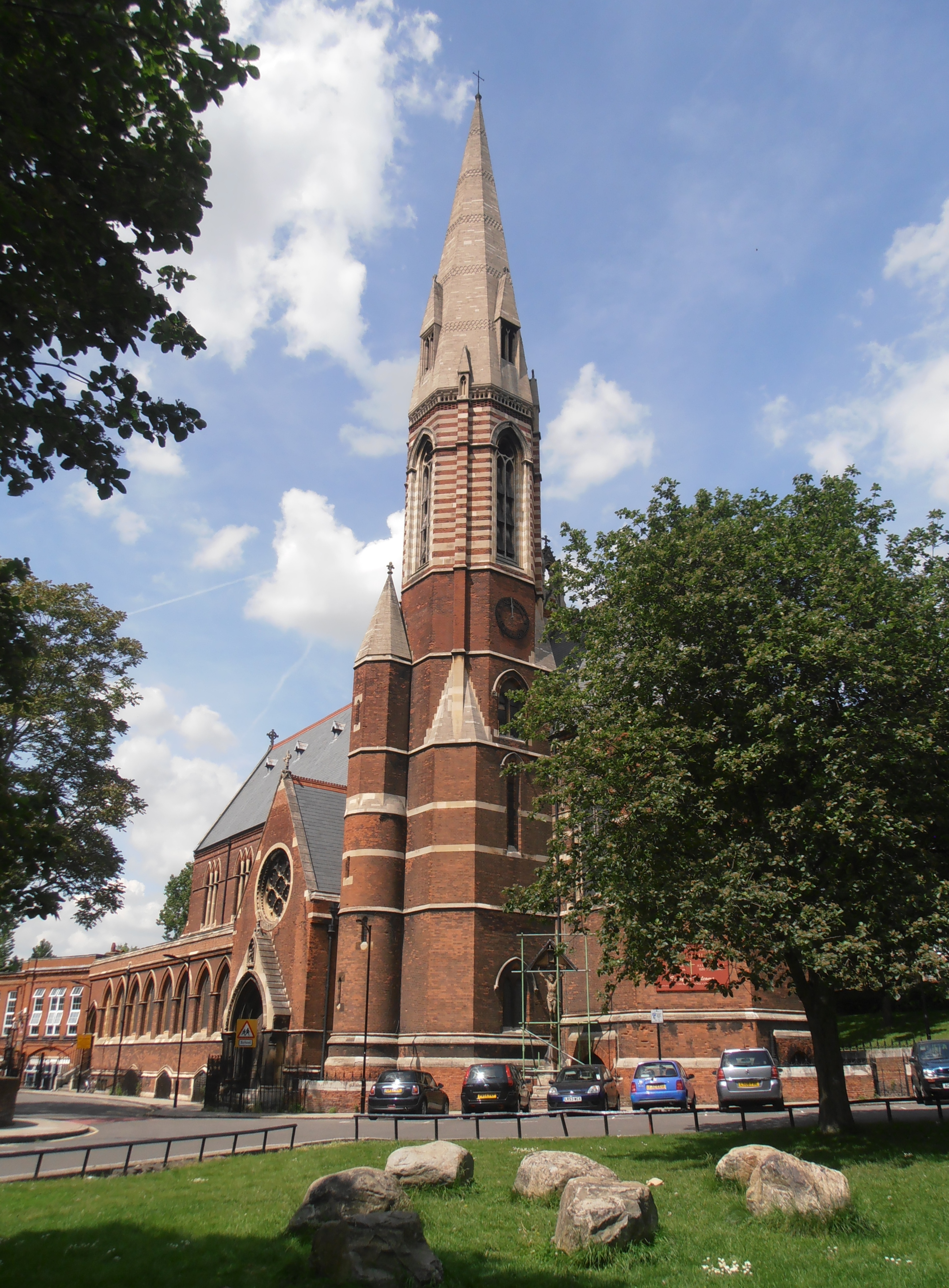
St. Mary Magdalene

The original blue lamp was transferred to the new Paddington Green Police Station. It is still outside the front of the station and was restored in the early 21st century. Most of the locations around the police station are unrecognisable now because of the Marylebone flyover. The police station at 325 Harrow Road, not far from the site of the Coliseum Cinema (324–326 Harrow Road), which is also shown in the film, has a reproduction blue lamp at its entrance.

The Metropolitan Theatre of Varieties, featured prominently at the start of the film, was demolished because it was thought likely that the Marylebone flyover would need the site, although that turned out not to be the case. It is now the site of Paddington Green Police Station. The scene involving a robbery on a jeweller's shop was filmed at the nearby branch of national chain, F. Hinds (then at 290 Edgware Road). This was also razed when the flyover was built.

The scenes of the cinema robbery were filmed at the Coliseum Cinema on Harrow Road, next to the Grand Union Canal bridge. The cinema was probably built in 1922, was closed in 1956 and later demolished. The site is now occupied by an office of Paddington Churches Housing Association.

Some of the streets used or seen in the film include: Harrow Road W2 and W9, Bishop's Bridge Road W2, Westbourne Terrace Bridge Road W9, Delamere Terrace, Blomfield Road, Formosa Street, Lord Hill's Road, Kinnaird Street and Senior Street W2, Ladbroke Grove W10, Portobello Road W11, Latimer Road, Sterne Street W12 and Hythe Road NW10. The church which features prominently towards the end is St Mary Magdalene, Senior Street W2. Most of the streets around the church were demolished in the 1960s to make way for the new Warwick Estate in Little Venice.

Tom Riley's home was in the run-down street of Amberley Mews, north of the canal, and is now the site of Ellwood Court, part of the Amberley Estate. It is from this mews that Riley walks into Formosa Street, then crosses the Halfpenny Bridge. He then goes into Diana Lewis's flat on the corner of Delamere Terrace and Lord Hill's Road where he attacks her and is chased out by the following detective. Then follows one of the first extended car chases in British film. The route of the chase is as follows: Senior Street W2, Clarendon Crescent W2, Harrow Road W9, Ladbroke Grove W10, Portobello Road W11, Ladbroke Grove W10, Royal Crescent W10, Portland Road W10, Penzance Place W10, Freston Road W10, Hythe Road NW10, Sterne Street W12 – then a chase on foot into Wood Lane and then to White City Stadium. Most of the chase is a logical following of Riley's car apart from when the car goes from Hythe Road NW10 into Sterne Street – Hythe Road in 1949 was a dead end.

== Reception ==
=== Critical ===
The Blue Lamp premiered on 20 January 1950 at the Odeon Leicester Square in London, and the reviewer for The Times found the depiction of the police work very plausible and realistic and praised the performances of Dirk Bogarde and Peggy Evans, but found Jack Warner's and Jimmy Hanley's characterisation of the two policemen to have been portrayed in an exceedingly traditional manner: "There is an indefinable feel of the theatrical backcloth behind their words and actions ... The sense that the policemen they are acting are not policemen as they really are, but policemen as an indulgent tradition has chosen to think they are, will not be banished."

In the context of a campaign against perceived "middle-class complacency" in British filmmaking, Sight and Sound editor Gavin Lambert (writing under a pseudonym) attacked the film's "specious brand of mediocrity" and suggested the film was "boring and parochial", views that caused outrage.

Upon the film's American release in early 1951, critic Bosley Crowther of The New York Times wrote: "A warm and affectionate tribute to the London metropolitan police in the daily performance of their duties is cleverly interlaced with a good running crime melodrama of a conspicuously realistic sort ... Full of fresh human interest touches, as well as honest admiration for the police, this film combines lively entertainment with a solid chunk of social argument."

=== Box-office ===
The film had the highest audiences in Britain for a British film that year. According to Kinematograph Weekly the "biggest winners" at the box office in 1950 Britain were The Blue Lamp, The Happiest Days of Your Life, Annie Get Your Gun, The Wooden Horse, Treasure Island and Odette.

=== Awards ===
The film won the 1951 BAFTA Award for Best British Film and was nominated for the Golden Lion at the 1950 Venice Film Festival.

== Legacy ==
In 1951, a stage play of the same name was written by Willis and Read. It ran for 32 performances at the Hippodrome in London. It also played at the Hippodrome in Bristol. In 1952, the play ran for 192 performances in a summer season at the Grand Theatre, Blackpool, Lancashire. Gordon Harker took the role of George Dixon, while Jack Warner played Chief Inspector Cherry.

Several of the characters and actors were carried over into the TV series Dixon of Dock Green, including the resurrected Dixon, still played by Warner. The series ran on BBC Television (BBC1) for twenty-one years from 1955 to 1976, with Warner being over eighty by the time of its conclusion.

In 1988, Arthur Ellis's satirical BBC Two play The Black and Blue Lamp had the film characters of Riley (Sean Chapman) and PC "Taffy" Hughes (Karl Johnson) transported forward in time into an episode of The Filth, a gritty contemporary police television series, replacing their modern-day counterparts.

In 2010, the BBC Television drama Ashes to Ashes concluded with a short clip of George Dixon, referring to the similarity to Dixon's death in The Blue Lamp and subsequent resurrection for the television series and the underlying plot of the show.
