= Betty Box =

British film producer (1915–1999)

Betty Box OBE
- Box in 1959
- Born: Betty Evelyn Box; 25 September 1915; Beckenham, Kent, England
- Died: 15 January 1999 (aged 83); Chiltern, Buckinghamshire, England
- Occupation: Film producer
- Spouse(s): Peter Rogers (m. 1948–1999; her death)

Betty Evelyn Box (25 September 1915 – 15 January 1999) was a British film producer, usually credited as Betty E. Box.

== Early life and career ==
Born in Beckenham, Kent, England, Betty Box initially planned to be a commercial artist or journalist. She entered the motion picture industry in 1942, joining her brother Sydney and his wife, director Muriel Box at Verity Films, where she helped produce more than 200 wartime propaganda shorts. She said:

Sitting around was no good for me, my brother said, and he asked me to work for him. He was running an organisation that made training and recruitment films. I went along as a general dogsbody, and as more men were called up, there were more opportunities for me. We worked from 7 a.m. until 10 or 11 at night. I learnt more in those two years than I would in ten years in peacetime.

Following World War II, she made an easy transition to feature films, beginning with The Years Between (1946).

When her brother assumed control of Gainsborough Pictures that year, he named her Head of Production at the Poole Street, Hoxton studio, where she produced ten films during the next two years. While tight budgets and shooting schedules compromised the quality of some of them, others – such as When the Bough Breaks (1947) – proved to be among the most politically interesting films of the period. "Every story I have at the moment has a murder in it", she said in 1947. "It's no wonder I'm being called 'Bloodthirsty Box'." She was also known for the trio of popular Huggetts films, starting with Here Come the Huggetts (1948) and followed by Vote for Huggett and The Huggetts Abroad (1949).

== The Rank Organisation ==
When the Gainsborough studios were closed by Rank in 1949, Box moved to Pinewood Studios, where she collaborated with director Ralph Thomas on some 30-odd films. They began by making thrillers such as Venetian Bird (1952) but then concentrated on comedy.

The biggest success of their career commercially was the seven-film Doctor series, beginning with Doctor in the House (1954) and ending with Doctor in Trouble (1970). The comedies contained a wacky irreverence which clearly struck a chord with contemporary audiences and helped to make stars of the young Dirk Bogarde and Donald Sinden.

Towards the end of her career, Box said the genre she preferred was comedy:

You can assess laughter. I get pleasure out of making a movie, but to listen to people laughing at what we have made – this is great. I'm a natural pessimist. Comedies are difficult. You can make a good adventure story if you have the money, good actors, and a good story (more often than not a best-selling book), and you'll know the film will please. Comedy is more of an instinctive thing.

== Personal life ==
Betty Box was married to Peter Rogers, producer of the Carry On film series, from 24 December 1948 until her death. It was her second marriage; her first, to a pilot during the war, ended in divorce.

Box and Rogers did not have any children; "We made the choice not to have children", said Box in 1973. "I don't think I would have made a very good mother. You know making a movie is like having a baby – it takes eight weeks to film and nine months to produce." She was godmother to Donald Sinden's youngest son Marc Sinden.

Box was appointed OBE in 1958.

She died in Chiltern, Buckinghamshire, aged 83 from cancer in 1999.

A posthumous autobiography Lifting the Lid: The Autobiography of Film Producer Betty Box was published in 2000.

== Selected filmography ==
=== Gainsborough ===
- 29 Acacia Avenue (1945) (associate producer)
- The Seventh Veil (1946) (associate producer)
- A Girl in a Million (1946) (associate producer)
- The Years Between (1946) (associate producer – uncredited)
- Dear Murderer (1947)
- The Upturned Glass (1947) (associate producer)
- When the Bough Breaks (1947)
- Here Come the Huggetts (1948)
- Daybreak (1948) (associate producer)
- The Blind Goddess (1948) (executive producer)
- Miranda (1948)
- Vote for Huggett (1949)
- Marry Me! (1949) aka I Want to Get Married
- Christopher Columbus (1949)
- It's Not Cricket (1949)
- The Huggetts Abroad (1949)

=== Rank ===
- Don't Ever Leave Me (1949)
- So Long at the Fair (1950)
- The Clouded Yellow (1950)
- Appointment with Venus (1951)
- Venetian Bird (1952) aka The Assassin
- A Day To Remember (1953)
- Mad About Men (1954)
- Doctor in the House (1954)
- Doctor at Sea (1955)
- The Iron Petticoat (1956)
- Checkpoint (1956)
- Doctor at Large (1957)
- Campbell's Kingdom (1957)
- True as a Turtle (1957) (uncredited)
- The Wind Cannot Read (1958)
- A Tale of Two Cities (1958)
- The 39 Steps (1959)
- Upstairs and Downstairs (1959)
- Conspiracy of Hearts (1960)
- Doctor in Love (1960)
- No My Darling Daughter (1961)
- No Love for Johnnie (1961)
- A Pair of Briefs (1961)
- The Wild and the Willing (1962)
- Doctor in Distress (1963)
- Hot Enough for June (1964)
- The High Bright Sun (1965)
- Doctor in Clover (1966)
- Deadlier Than the Male (1967)
- Nobody Runs Forever (1968)
- Some Girls Do (1969)

=== Welbeck Films ===
- Doctor in Trouble (1970)
- Percy (1971)
- Anyone for Sex? (1973) (aka The Love Ban)
- Percy's Progress (1974)

=== Other ===
- The Olive Tree (1975) (TV movie)

=== Unmade films ===
- Requiem for a Wren (1959) – story about World War two from a woman's point of view based on script by R. C. Sherriff

== Bibliography ==
- Lifting the Lid by Betty Box, published posthumously in 2000, ISBN 978-1-85776-489-5
