= The Final Test =

1953 film by Anthony Asquith

- Directed by: Anthony Asquith
- Written by: Terence Rattigan
- Starring: Jack Warner; Robert Morley; Ray Jackson
- Cinematography: William McLeod
- Edited by: Helga Cranston
- Music by: Benjamin Frankel
- Production company: ACT Films Ltd
- Distributed by: General Film Distributors (UK)
- Release date: 14 August 1953
- Running time: 90 minutes
- Country: United Kingdom
- Language: English

The Final Test is a 1953 British sports film written by Terence Rattigan, directed by Anthony Asquith, and starring Jack Warner, Robert Morley, George Relph and Ray Jackson. A number of leading cricketers also appear including Denis Compton, Len Hutton and Cyril Washbrook. The film was produced by R.J. Minney for Act Films Ltd. It was that company's second film.

== Plot ==
The film is a light drama, set around elderly leading cricketer Sam Palmer's last appearance for England. Action jumps between various elements: an Englishman explaining to an American the rules and terminologies of the game from the audience; Sam's home life; the pub listening to cricket on the radio; Sam's interactions with players and family; and Reggie's attempts to meet his theatrical hero Alexander Whitehead. This is interspersed with documentary footage of real cricket games.

Sam desperately wants his son Reggie to be there at The Oval to witness his last match, but Reggie has a developing passion for poetry and instead of attending the game has a ‘once in a lifetime’ chance of meeting a leading poet, Alexander Whitehead. But when Reggie meets Whitehead, it turns out he is a huge fan of cricket. Whitehead takes Reggie along to the match, in time to see Sam's innings, and persuades Reggie that there is more to cricket than he had previously thought.

In Sam's final appearance he is dismissed leg before wicket. As he walks back to the pavilion the other players line his route and the spectators give him a standing ovation.

== Cast ==
- Jack Warner as Sam Palmer
- Robert Morley as Alexander Whitehead
- George Relph as Syd Thompson
- Adrianne Allen as Aunt Ethel
- Ray Jackson as Reggie Palmer
- Brenda Bruce as Cora the barmaid
- Richard Bebb as Frank Weller
- Stanley Maxted as Senator
- Joan Swinstead as Miss Fanshawe
- John Glyn-Jones as Mr. Willis
- Richard Wattis as the spectator explaining cricket to the American

The England cricketers Len Hutton, Denis Compton, Alec Bedser, Godfrey Evans, Jim Laker and Cyril Washbrook appear as themselves with John Arlott providing the match commentary.

== Genesis ==
The writer Terence Rattigan was an excellent cricketer in his school days. He was opening batsman for the Harrow Eleven, often in partnership with Victor Rothschild, and in 1929 he represented Harrow at Lord's in the annual match against Eton College. He originally wrote The Final Test - his first play for television - in 1951, partly as a tribute to Sir Donald Bradman, who was out for a duck in his final test in 1948. That production was directed by Royston Morley and starred Patrick Barr as Sam Palmer.

As with almost all of Rattigan's plays, the theme of the relationship between father and son, and the tension between parental expectations and the son's driving force leading him in different directions, is explored.

The play was filmed in 1953, directed by Anthony Asquith.

== Critical reception ==
In The Spectator, Virginia Graham wrote, "Often witty, always undeviatingly amiable, this is a delightful film, a simple friendly film full of national jokes which, as no other country could possibly share them, give one the comfortable relaxed feeling of being at home and liking it there"; Sky Cinema wrote, "It's difficult to imagine that this little film packed London's huge Odeon, Leicester Square, in its day, but it did"; Leonard Maltin called it a "Droll, minor comedy"; The New York Times wrote, "Perhaps the cognoscenti will not call "The Final Test" cricket, but it definitely adds up to fun"; and more recently, The Guardian called it "Britain's only significant cricket picture."

The film ran for six months in New York and became one of Harold Wilson's favorite movies.

== Media releases ==
The film was released on Region 2 DVD on 6 August 2007.
