= Charles Victor =

British actor (1896–1965)

- Victor in 1963
- Born: Charles Victor Harvey; 10 February 1896; Southport, Lancashire, England
- Died: 23 December 1965 (aged 69); Putney, London, England
- Occupation: Actor
- Years active: 1938–1965

Charles Victor (10 February 1896 – 23 December 1965) was a British actor who appeared in many film and television roles between 1931 and 1965. He was born Charles Victor Harvey.

== Early life ==
Born in Southport, Lancashire, England, Victor was a fourth-generation English music hall entertainer. He left school when he was 15 to team with his father in a song-and-dance act for five years. After leaving that act, he briefly worked with his brother in an automobile agency before going into English musical comedy. In 1929, he joined the Birmingham Repertory Theatre, which was headed by Barry Jackson, and stayed with it for 10 years.

== Career ==
Victor appeared in just over 100 films between 1938 and 1966. The size and importance of his roles varied greatly. For example, in 1957 he played the lead role, with top billing, in the comedy There's Always a Thursday, whilst in the same year he had a bit part in the biopic After the Ball.

Late in life, Victor toured internationally in the role of Alfred Doolittle in My Fair Lady, performing the role on The Ed Sullivan Show on 19 March 1961 during a tribute to Alan Jay Lerner and Frederick Loewe.

== Selected filmography ==
- The Return of the Frog (1938) as Customer in Night Club (uncredited)
- Hell's Cargo (1939) as Mr. Martin
- Where's That Fire? (1939) as Garage Owner (uncredited)
- Laugh It Off (1940) as Colonel
- Contraband (1940) as Hendrick
- Dr. O'Dowd (1940) as Dooley
- Old Mother Riley in Society (1940) as Sir John Morgan
- You Will Remember (1941) as Pat Barrett
- Major Barbara (1941) as Bilton
- Old Mother Riley in Business (1941)
- East of Piccadilly (1941) as Editor
- This England (1941)
- Atlantic Ferry (1941) as Tim Grogan
- He Found a Star (1941) as Ben Marsh
- 49th Parallel (1941) as Andreas
- Ships with Wings (1941) as MacDermott
- Rush Hour (1941, Short) as Bus Inspector (uncredited)
- The Missing Million (1942) as Nobby Knowles
- Partners in Crime (1941) (uncredited)
- Breach of Promise (1942) as Sir William
- The Next of Kin (1942) as Joe, Irish seaman
- The Foreman Went to France (1942) as Aircraft Spotter on Works Roof
- They Flew Alone (1942) as Postmaster
- Let the People Sing (1942) as Bit Role (uncredited)
- Lady from Lisbon (1942) as Porter
- Seven Days' Leave (1942) as Mr. Charles Victor
- Those Kids from Town (1942) as Vicar
- The Peterville Diamond (1943) as Dan
- Squadron Leader X (1943) as Marks
- The Silver Fleet (1943) as Bastiaan Peters
- When We Are Married (1943) as Mr. Northrup
- The Bells Go Down (1943) as Bill, Dunkirk Survivor (uncredited)
- Undercover (1943) as Sergeant
- The Saint Meets the Tiger (1943) as Bittle
- Rhythm Serenade (1943) as Mr. Martin
- Escape to Danger (1943) as Petty Officer Flanagan
- My Learned Friend (1943) as 'Safety' Wilson
- They Met in the Dark (1943) as Pub Owner
- San Demetrio London (1943) as Deckhand
- It Happened One Sunday (1944) as Frisco Kid
- The Man from Morocco (1945) as Bourdille
- I Live in Grosvenor Square (1945) as Taxi Driver
- The Way to the Stars (1945) as Corporal Fitter
- The Rake's Progress (1945) as Old Sweat
- Caesar and Cleopatra (1945) as 1st. Porter
- Gaiety George (1946) as Danny Collier
- This Man Is Mine (1946) as Hijacker
- The Magic Bow (1946) as Peasant Driver
- While the Sun Shines (1947) as Tube Train Conductor
- Woman to Woman (1947) as Stage Manager
- Meet Me at Dawn (1947) as 1st Client
- Temptation Harbour (1947) as Gowshall
- Green Fingers (1947) as Joe Mansel
- While I Live (1947) as Sgt. Pearne
- The Calendar (1948) as John Dory
- Broken Journey (1948) as Harry Gunn
- Vote for Huggett (1949) as Mr. Hall
- Fools Rush In (1949) as Mr. Atkins
- Landfall (1949) as Mona's Father
- The Cure for Love (1949) as Henry Lancaster
- Waterfront (1950) as Bill
- The Woman in Question (1950) as Albert Pollard
- The Elusive Pimpernel (1950) as Colonel Winterbotham
- The Galloping Major (1951) as Sam Fisher
- Calling Bulldog Drummond (1951) as Insp. McIver
- The Magic Box (1951) as Industry Man
- Encore (1951) as Mr. Bateman (segment "The Ant and the Grasshopper")
- The Frightened Man (1952) as Rosselli
- Something Money Can't Buy (1952) as Borough Treasurer
- The Ringer (1952) as Inspector Wembury
- Made in Heaven (1952) as Aubrey Topham
- Appointment in London (1952) as Dobbie
- Those People Next Door (1953) as Joe Higgins
- Street Corner (1953) as Muller
- Murder Without Tears (1953)
- The Saint's Return (1953) as Chief Insp. Claud Teal
- Meet Mr Lucifer (1953) as Mr. Elder
- The Girl on the Pier (1953) as Inspector Chubb
- The Love Lottery (1954) as Jennings
- Fast and Loose (1954) as Lumper
- The Rainbow Jacket (1954) as Voss
- The Embezzler (1954) as Henry Paulson
- For Better, for Worse (1954) as Fred
- Police Dog (1955) as Sergeant
- Value for Money (1955) as Lumm
- An Alligator Named Daisy (1955) as Police Sergeant (uncredited)
- Dial 999 (1955) as Tom Smithers (U.S., ' The Way Out ')
- Now and Forever (1956) as Farmer Gilbert
- Charley Moon (1956) as Miller Moon
- The Extra Day (1956) as Bert
- Eyewitness (1956) as Police Desk Sergeant
- Home and Away (1956) as Ted Groves
- Tiger in the Smoke (1956) as Will
- There's Always a Thursday (1957) as George Potter
- The Prince and the Showgirl (1957) as Theatre Manager
- After the Ball (1957) as Stagehand
- Band of Angels (1957) as Officer (uncredited)
- Passion Holiday (1963) (uncredited)
- Made in Paris (1966) as Livingston (uncredited)
