= Amy Veness =

British actress (1876–1960)

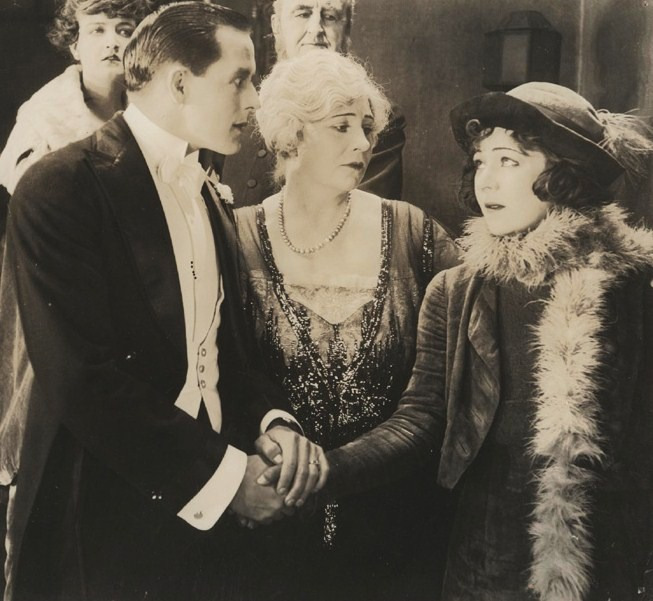
- Charles Bryant, Amy Veness, and Alla Nazimova in The Brat (1919)
- Born: Amy Clarice Beart; 26 February 1876; Aldeburgh, Suffolk, England
- Died: 22 September 1960 (aged 84); Saltdean, Sussex, England
- Other name: Amy Van Ness
- Years active: 1917–1955

Amy Veness (26 February 1876 – 22 September 1960) was an English film actress. She played the role of Grandma Huggett in The Huggetts Trilogy and was sometimes credited as Amy Van Ness.

Veness was born Amy Clarice Beart in Aldeburgh, Suffolk. She was married to Basil Springett. On 22 September 1960 she died in Saltdean, Sussex, England at age 84.

== Selected filmography ==
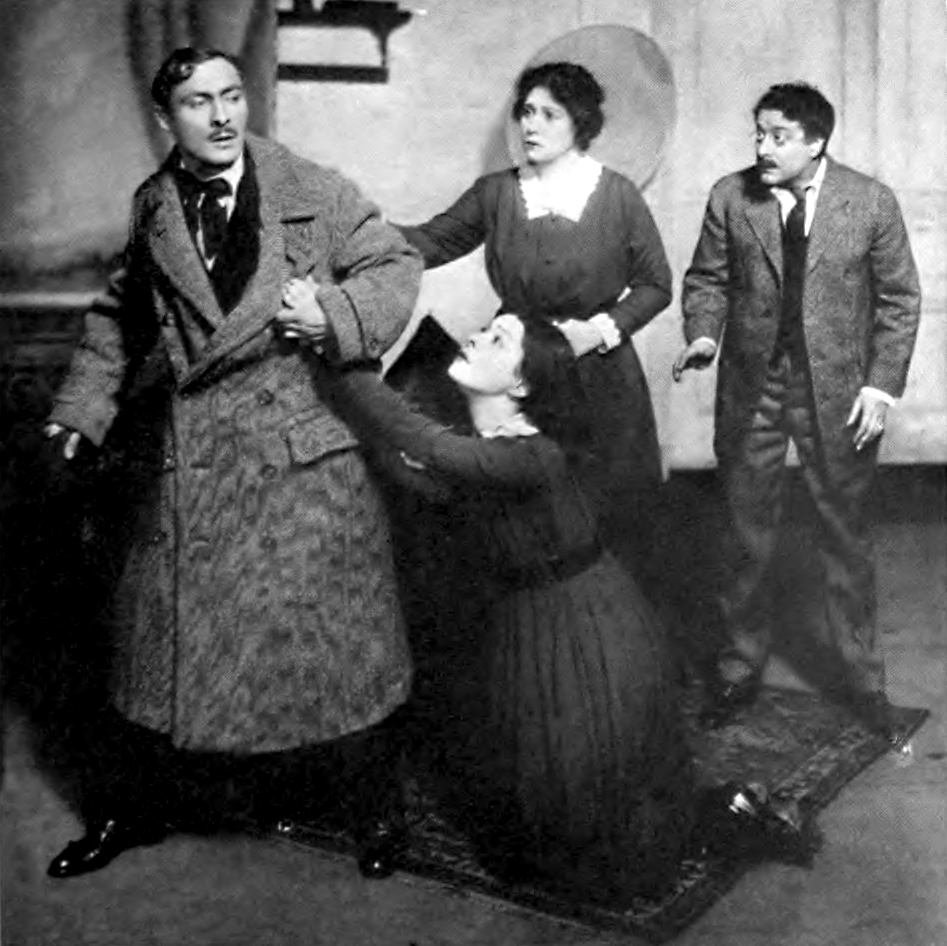
Lionel Atwill, Alla Nazimova, Amy Veness and Harry Mestayer in the 1918 Broadway production of Ibsen's The Wild Duck

- Please Help Emily (1917) - Mrs. Lethbridge
- My Wife (1918) - Mrs. Hammond
- The Brat (1919) - Mrs. Forrester
- The Wife's Family (1931) - Arabella Nagg
- Hobson's Choice (1931) - Mrs. Hepworth
- Tonight's the Night (1932) - Emily Smithers
- Murder on the Second Floor (1932) - (uncredited)
- Money for Nothing (1932) - Emma Bolt
- Self Made Lady (1932) - Old Sookey
- The Marriage Bond (1932) - Mrs. Crust
- Pyjamas Preferred (1932) - Mme. Gautier
- Let Me Explain, Dear (1932) - Aunt Fanny
- Red Wagon (1933) - Petal Schultze
- The Love Nest (1933) - Ma
- Their Night Out (1933) - Gertrude Bunting
- Hawleys of High Street (1933) - Mrs. Hawley
- A Southern Maid (1934) - Donna Rosa
- The Old Curiosity Shop (1934) - Mrs. Jarley
- Lorna Doone (1934) - Betty Muxworthy
- Brewster's Millions (1935) - Mrs. Barry
- Drake of England (1935) - Mother Moore
- Joy Ride (1935) - Lady Clara Mutch-Twistleton
- Play Up the Band (1935) - Lady Heckdyke
- Royal Cavalcade (1935)
- The Beloved Vagabond (1936) - Cafe Owner
- Crime Over London (1936)
- Windbag the Sailor (1936) - Emma Harbottle
- The Mill on the Floss (1936) - Mrs. Deane
- Skylarks (1936) - Stacy Hirano
- King of Hearts (1936) - Mrs. Ponsonby
- Black Roses (1936) - Annushka
- Aren't Men Beasts! (1937) - Mrs. Flower
- The Show Goes On (1937) - Mrs. Scowcroft, Sally's Mother
- The Angelus (1937) - Mrs. Grimes
- Thistledown (1938) - Mary Glenloch
- Yellow Sands (1938) - Mary Varwell
- Flying Fifty-Five (1939) - Aunt Eliza
- Just William (1940) - Mrs. Bott
- This England (1941) - Jenny
- The Saint Meets the Tiger (1941) - Mrs. Donald Jones
- The Man in Grey (1943) - Mrs. Armstrong (uncredited)
- Millions Like Us (1943) - Mrs. Blythe
- Fanny by Gaslight (1944) - Mrs. Heaviside
- This Happy Breed (1944) - Mrs. Flint
- Don't Take It to Heart (1944) - Cook
- Madonna of the Seven Moons (1945) - Tessa
- The World Owes Me a Living (1945) - Mrs. Waterman (uncredited)
- They Were Sisters (1945) - Mrs. Purley
- Don Chicago (1945) - Bowie Knife Bella
- Carnival (1946) - Aunt Fanny
- The Turners of Prospect Road (1947) - Grandma
- Master of Bankdam (1947) - Mrs. Pilling
- Blanche Fury (1948) - Mrs. Winterbourne
- Good-Time Girl (1948) - Mrs. Chalk
- Oliver Twist (1948) - Mrs. Bedwin
- Bond Street (1948) - Seamstress
- My Brother's Keeper (1948) - Mrs. Gully
- Here Come the Huggetts (1948) - Grandma Huggett
- Vote for Huggett (1949) - Grandma Huggett
- A Boy, a Girl and a Bike (1949) - Grannie
- The Huggetts Abroad (1949) - Grandma
- The Astonished Heart (1950) - Alice Smith
- Madeleine (1950) - Miss Aiken (uncredited)
- Chance of a Lifetime (1950) - Lady Davis
- The Woman with No Name (1950) - Sophie
- Portrait of Clare (1950) - Lady in the Train
- Captain Horatio Hornblower (1951) - Mrs. McPhee (Hornblower's Housekeeper)
- The Magic Box (1951) - Grandmother in Wedding Group
- Tom Brown's Schooldays (1951) - Mrs. Wixie
- Angels One Five (1952) - Aunt Tabitha
- Doctor in the House (1954) - Grandma Cooper (uncredited)
- The Woman for Joe (1955) - Landlady (uncredited) (final film role)
