= Home and Away (film) =

1956 British film by Vernon Sewell

- Original British Quad poster
- Directed by: Vernon Sewell
- Written by: Vernon Sewell (play adaptation); R. F. Delderfield (additional dialogue)
- Based on: the play Treble Trouble by Heather McIntyre
- Produced by: George Maynard
- Starring: Jack Warner; Kathleen Harrison; Charles Victor; Thora Hird; Leslie Henson
- Cinematography: Basil Emmott
- Edited by: Peter Rolfe Johnson
- Music by: Robert Sharples
- Production company: George Maynard Productions
- Distributed by: Eros Films (UK)
- Release date: 5 September 1956 (UK)
- Running time: 80 minutes
- Country: United Kingdom
- Language: English

Home and Away is a 1956 British drama film directed by Vernon Sewell and starring Jack Warner and Kathleen Harrison. It depicts the life of an ordinary working-class man after he wins the football pools. The film reunited Warner and Harrison who had previously appeared together in the Huggetts series of films.

== Plot ==
After years of doing the football pools every week George Knowles is stunned to find that all his score draws have come up and he's won the "Treble Chance" jackpot. As George and his family celebrate with an impromptu party, his son Johnnie arrives home and drops a bombshell: the coupon belongs, not to George, but to Johnnie and his workmate Syd Jarvis. But when Syd's gold-digging and wanton mother finds out about the windfall she decides to lock her son up in order to keep him away from his share of the fortune.

== Cast ==
- Jack Warner as George Knowles
- Kathleen Harrison as Elsie
- Lana Morris as Mary
- Charles Victor as Ted Groves
- Thora Hird as Margie
- Valerie White as Mrs. Jarvis
- Harry Fowler as Syd
- Kate O'Mara as Annie Knowles (billed as Merrie Carroll)
- Bernard Fox as Johnnie Knowles
- Margaret St Barbe West as Aunt Jean
- Ross Pendleton as Al, Mary's boyfriend
- Leslie Henson as Uncle Tom
- Sam Kydd as Albert West

== Production ==
The Hyams also produced the play in the West End which Vernon Sewell said was a disaster.

== Critical reception ==
Monthly Film Bulletin said "An innocuous British comedy which makes little attempt to hide its stage origins (most of the action is confined to the family’s living-room) and includes a liberal helping of the genial vulgarity usually associated with such material. An experienced cast works its way through some predictable situations, with Charles Victor contributing an amusing cameo as the next door neighbour whose ambition is to perfect a gas-driven television set."

In British Sound Films: The Studio Years 1928–1959 David Quinlan rated the film as "average", writing: "The Huggets live again in this comedy from the archives; some fun though."

The Radio Times Guide to Films gave the film 1/5 stars, writing: "This is a non-Huggett reunion for Jack Warner and Kathleen Harrison. Written and directed by Vernon Sewell, this contrived tale of a widow trying to cheat a fortune out of the pools is meant to be whimsical and slightly wicked. However, it ends up merely frantic and unfunny, with the Warner-Harrison partnership having one of its few off-days."
