= Sydney Box =

British film producer and screenwriter (1907–1983)

- Born: Frank Sydney Box; 29 April 1907; Beckenham, Kent, England, UK
- Died: 25 May 1983 (aged 76); Perth, Western Australia, Australia
- Occupations: Film producer; writer; screenwriter; film company co-founder
- Years active: 1935–1967
- Spouses: Muriel Box (1935–1969), Sylvia Knowles
- Children: 1 daughter, Leonora

Frank Sydney Box (29 April 1907 – 25 May 1983) was a British film producer and screenwriter, brother of British film producer Betty Box and husband of script writer and director, Muriel Box.

Sydney and Muriel married in 1935, had a daughter Leonora the following year, and divorced in 1969.

== Early Career ==
Formerly a journalist, Sydney became a theatrical producer and playwright in the 1930s and, with his wife Muriel Box, produced and in some cases, wrote, more than 100 one-act plays. He published some of these and also edited anthologies of one-act plays, often intended for use by amateur theatrical groups, including:

'Ladies Only' Six one-act plays for all-women casts. By Muriel(nee Baker) and Sydney Box 1934, published by George G. Harrap & Co. Ltd

'One-Act Plays for Players' Edited by Sydney Box 1935, published by George G. Harrap & Co. Ltd

'Monologues and Duologues of To-Day' Edited by Sydney Box 1935 published by George G. Harrap & Co. Ltd

In 1940, he founded the documentary film company Verity Films with Jay Lewis.

He produced and co-wrote the screenplay, with his then wife director Muriel Box, for The Seventh Veil (1945), which received the 1946 Oscar for best original screenplay.

== Gainsborough Studios ==
The couple were hired after the war (1945) by the Rank Organisation to run Gainsborough Studios. They disapproved of the Gainsborough melodramas which had been the studio's major successes for several years, and switched production to a broader range of more "realistic" films with mixed results. Box made 36 films at Gainsborough, which was merged into the Rank Organization in 1949. It has been argued Box's overexpansion "killed" Gainsborough.

In 1951 Box founded his own production company London Independent Producers with William MacQuitty.

Box was part of a consortium that launched the ITV franchise, Tyne Tees Television in 1959.

== The Rank Organisation ==
In the late 1950s Box signed a deal to make numermous low budget films for the Rank Organisation.

In September 1959 Box announced he was quitting filmmaking due to medical advice.

In December 1959 Rank announced Sydney Box Associates would make a series of films for the company including Love Birds starring Brian Rix, Not in the Book produced by Norman Williams and scripted by Peter Blackmore from Arthur Watkyn’s play, No Concern of Mine from Jeremy Kingston's play, Milk and Honey from Philip King’s play: Watch It, Sailor! also based on a Philip King play, See No Evil an original by Jimmy Sangster, and Time to Kill another original by Leigh Vance. Some of these films would be made by other companies. It has been argued he was allowed to make "far too many movies" for Rank.

According to Sue Harper and Vincent Porter:

Box was a skilled entrepreneur who was able to raise regular loans from the NFFC and to encourage others' talents. According to his assistant David Deutsch, he provided, more effectively than anyone he had ever known, 'the right environment for creative people to work, welcoming, encouraging and subtly influencing'. Box’s position as an outsider—a socialist of sorts, a realist by instinct, and a feminist by default—meant that he became increasingly excluded from the meritocracy. He lacked a strong visual sense, but this was supplied by Muriel Box, whose lively inventiveness was accompanied by an uncompromising sexual radicalism, which pleased her but not the distributors or the audiences.

== Selected filmography ==
=== Screenwriter and producer ===
- Alibi Inn (1935)
- For Dealers Only (Ford Motor Company short) (1937)
- 29 Acacia Avenue (1945)
- The Seventh Veil (1945)
- The Years Between (1946)
- A Girl in a Million (1946)

=== London Independent Producers ===
- The Happy Family (1952)
- Street Corner (1953)
- The Beachcomber (1954)
- Forbidden Cargo (1954)
- Above Us the Waves (1955)
- The Prisoner (1955)
- Too Young to Love (1959)
- Accident (1967)
- The Man Outside (1967)
- Theatre of Death (1967)
- The Long Duel (1967)
- The Limbo Line (1968)
- Amsterdam Affair (1968)
- Taste of Excitement (1968)

=== Producer ===
- Country Town (1943)
- Don't Take It to Heart (1944)
- The Brothers (1947)

=== Rank Organisation Film Productions ===
- Eyewitness (1956)
- Floods of Fear (1958)

=== Orbit Films ===
- Subway in the Sky (1959)

=== Beaconsfield ===
- The Passionate Stranger (1957)
- The Truth About Women (1957)
- Heart of a Child (1958)

=== Sydney Box Associates ===
- Blind Date (1959)
- SOS Pacific (1959)
- Piccadilly Third Stop (1960)

=== Alliance Film Distributors ===
- Strictly Confidential (1959)
- Too Hot to Handle (1960) - Wigmore - quit during production due to illness
- Shakedown (1960)
- Your Money or Your Wife (1960)
- And Women Shall Weep (1960)
- Witness in the Dark (1960)
- Operation Cupid (1960)

=== Welbeck Film Distributors ===
- To Dorothy a Son (1954)
- Too Young to Love (1959)
- The Night We Dropped a Clanger (1959)
- Desert Mice (1960)
- Faces in the Dark (1960)
- Beyond the Curtain (1960)

=== Films as Head of Gainsborough ===
- The Man Within (1947)
- The Brothers (1947)
- Dear Murderer (1947)
- The Upturned Glass (1947)
- Holiday Camp (1947)
- Jassy (1947)
- When the Bough Breaks (1947)
- Easy Money (1948)
- Snowbound (1948)
- Miranda (1948)
- Broken Journey (1948)
- Good-Time Girl (1948)
- The Calendar (1948)
- My Brother's Keeper (1948)
- The Blind Goddess (1948)
- Quartet (1948)
- Here Come the Huggetts (1948)
- Portrait from Life (1948)
- Vote for Huggett (1949)
- The Bad Lord Byron (1949)
- It's Not Cricket (1949)
- A Boy, a Girl and a Bike (1949)
- The Huggetts Abroad (1949)
- Marry Me! (1949)
- Christopher Columbus (1949)
- Helter Skelter (1949)
- Don't Ever Leave Me (1949)
- The Lost People (1949)
- Diamond City (1949)
- Boys in Brown (1949)
- Traveller's Joy (1949)
- The Astonished Heart (1950)
- So Long at the Fair (1950)
- Trio (1950)

== Selected plays ==
- The Seventh Veil (1951)
