= John Blythe (actor) =

English actor (1921–1993)

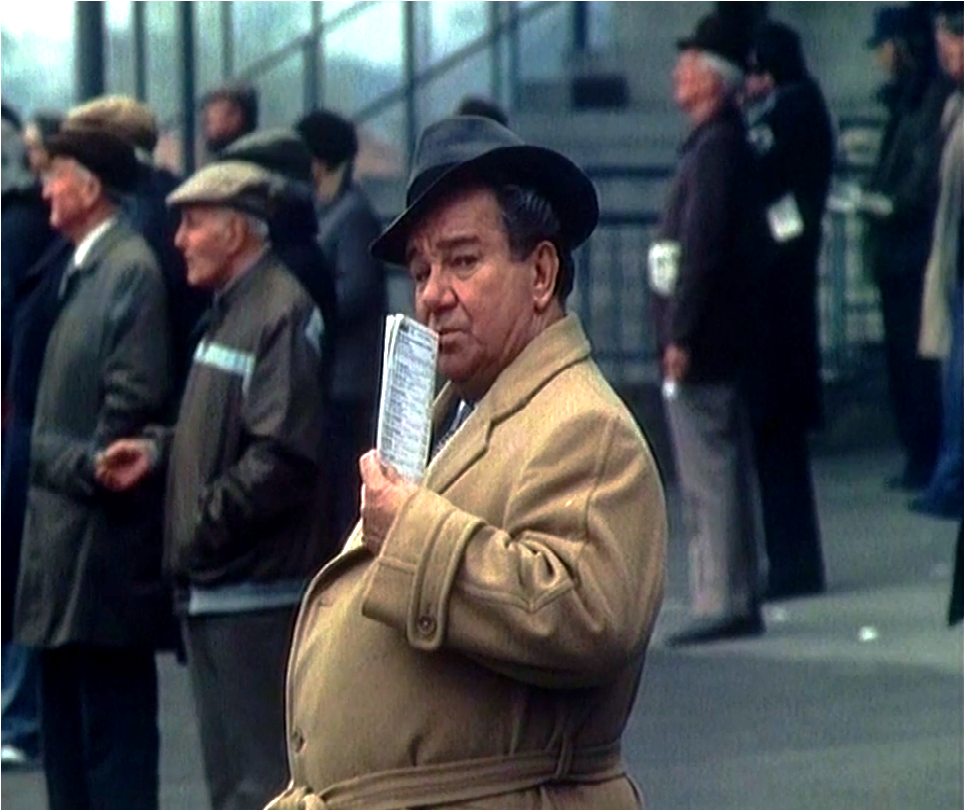
- Blythe in The Optimist, 1984
- Born: 31 October 1921; London, England
- Died: 24 November 1993 (aged 72); London, England
- Occupation: Actor
- Years active: 1939–1989 (film & TV)
- Spouse: Nan Blythe (?-1993) (his death)

John Blythe (31 October 1921 – 24 November 1993) was an English character actor.

== Career ==
He entered films as a stage hand aged sixteen and made his film debut with Goodbye Mr. Chips in 1939 as one of the schoolboys (uncredited).

His second film role was the much more substantial role of Reg Gibbons, son of Robert Newton's and Celia Johnson's Frank and Ethel, in Noël Coward's and David Lean's This Happy Breed (1944). He had a brief part, too, as Jane Hylton's boyfriend in Dear Murderer in 1947. He went on to specialise in playing spivs and fast talking wide boys, particularly during the late 'forties and early 'fifties when he enjoyed memorable roles in films such as Holiday Camp (1947), A Boy, a Girl and a Bike, Diamond City, Boys in Brown (all 1949) and Lilli Marlene (1950). He was also the garage owner Gowan in the three Huggett films, Here Come the Huggetts (1948), Vote for Huggett and The Huggetts Abroad (both 1949).

He also featured in River Patrol (1948), The Wedding of Lilli Marlene, (1953), Meet Mr. Malcolm (1954); The Cockleshell Heroes (1955); They Never Learn (1956); No Love for Johnnie (1961); The VIPs (1963), as well as many television series, including Hancock's Half Hour, No Hiding Place, Dixon of Dock Green; two editions of Crown Court, ('Triangle', and 'The Death of Dracula', episodes, 1973/74), Poldark and in 1974 as a crooked second hand car dealer in the popular comedy series Sykes, the episode entitled Two Birthdays.

He continued acting into the 1980s and died in London on 24 November 1993.
