= Gordon Dines =

British cinematographer

- Born: 4 June 1911; London, England; United Kingdom
- Died: 1982 (aged 70–71); Ealing, England; United Kingdom
- Occupation: Cinematographer
- Years active: 1932–1971

Gordon Dines (1911–1982) was a British cinematographer. Dines worked for many years at Ealing Studios, photographing films such as The Blue Lamp (1950).

== Selected filmography ==
- Feather Your Nest (1937)
- Keep Fit (1937)
- Penny Paradise (1938)
- The Gaunt Stranger (1938)
- It's in the Air (1938)
- Let's Be Famous (1939)
- Turned Out Nice Again (1941)
- Nicholas Nickleby (1947)
- Frieda (1947)
- The Blue Lamp (1950)
- Pool of London (1951)
- Secret People (1952)
- The Gentle Gunman (1952)
- The Cruel Sea (1953)
- The Square Ring (1953)
- The Crowded Day (1954)
- The Colditz Story (1955)
- The Long Arm (1956)
- The Lady Is a Square (1959)
- A Circle of Deception (1960)

== Bibliography ==
- Spicer, Andrew. Typical Men: The Representation of Masculinity in Popular British Cinema. I.B.Tauris, 2003.
