= Peter Hammond (actor) =

English actor and director (1923–2011)

- Born: Peter Charles Hammond Hill; 15 November 1923; London, England
- Died: 12 October 2011 (aged 87); London, England
- Years active: 1961–1994

Peter Charles Hammond Hill (15 November 1923 – 12 October 2011) was an English actor and television director.

Peter Charles Hammond Hill was born in Victoria, Central London. His father, Charles, was an art restorer and his mother, Ada, a nurse. After attending Harrow School of Art, he started work as a scenic artist at Sheffield Repertory Theatre. Following this, he turned to acting to "earn some cash", where he adopted the stage name of Peter Hammond. He first appeared in a West End production at the age of 17.

Hammond made his film début in Waterloo Road (1945) and carved a career playing handsome boy-next-door types throughout the late 1940s and early 1950s, especially in the role of Peter Hawtrey in The Huggetts Trilogy – Here Come the Huggetts (1948), Vote for Huggett and The Huggetts Abroad (both 1949). Hammond's other films include Holiday Camp (1947), Helter Skelter (1949), Morning Departure (1950), The Adventurers (1951) and X the Unknown (1956).

In 1950, Hammond was reunited with his Huggetts co-star Petula Clark and played her leading man in Ealing's Dance Hall. In this film he gave Clark her first screen kiss.

Hammond’s television roles include Hofmanstahl in The Adventures of William Tell and Lt. Edward Beamish in The Buccaneers.

In the 1960s, he turned to directing television programmes, including episodes of The Avengers, Armchair Theatre, Out of the Unknown, and the BBC serial The Three Musketeers (1966). His work on The Avengers gave Hammond a free hand to explore many stylistic opportunities. The producer Leonard White and series creator Sydney Newman both congratulated him on giving the early episodes their distinctive visual style, and Patrick Macnee credited him as a major influence in the shaping of the character of John Steed. It was through Hammond's work on The Avengers and Armchair Theatre (also produced by Leonard White) that he would be awarded a Director's Bafta Award in 1965. Hammond's work on The Avengers was entirely on the videotape seasons (1961–64). Although Brian Clemens, producer of the filmed episodes of the show (1965–69), approached him a few times about directing further episodes, Hammond wasn't interested: "I told them to get lost – there was nothing I could love about the Avengers being made on film".

Hammond’s one foray into cinema film as a director saw him directing James Mason in Spring and Port Wine (1970), based on the play of the same name by Bill Naughton and set in the Lancashire town of Bolton.

Hammond continued to direct many television series of the 1970s, 1980s, and 1990s, including King of the Castle, a production of Wuthering Heights for BBC Television in 1978, The Dark Angel for BBC2, Rumpole of the Bailey, Follyfoot, The Wednesday Play, Cold Comfort Farm in 1968, Tales of the Unexpected, The Little World of Don Camillo, The Return of Sherlock Holmes, Inspector Morse, and many more.

Peter Neill, a colleague who worked with Hammond on various productions of the time, remembers him as "very efficient, yet creative, with a friendly manner and sense of humour". He is said also to have had a good rapport with actors, perhaps due to his own background in that area.

He retired from directing in the mid-1990s due to illness and to look after his wife, Maureen Glynne, whom he married in 1948, until her death in 2005. They had three sons and two daughters, including the actress Juliet Hammond-Hill.

== Selected filmography ==
- They Knew Mr. Knight (1946)
- Fly Away Peter (1948)
- The Huggetts Abroad (1949)
- Helter Skelter (1949)
- The Reluctant Widow (1950)
- Dance Hall (1950)
- Morning Departure (1950)
- Father's Doing Fine (1952)
- Come Back Peter (1952)
- Flannelfoot (1953)
- Alf's Baby (1953)
- Confession (1955)
- It's Never Too Late (1956)
- Soho Incident (aka Spin a Dark Web) (1956)
- X the Unknown (1956)
- Model for Murder (1959)
