= Kathleen Harrison =

English actress (1892–1995)

- Born: 23 February 1892; Blackburn, Lancashire, England
- Died: 7 December 1995 (aged 103); Merton, London, England
- Occupation: Actress
- Years active: 1915–79
- Spouse: John Henry Back (1916–61, his death)
- Children: 3

Kathleen Harrison (23 February 1892 – 7 December 1995) was a prolific English character actress best remembered for her role as Mrs. Huggett (opposite Jack Warner and Petula Clark) in a trio of British post-war comedies about a working-class family's misadventures, The Huggetts. She later played the charwoman Mrs. Dilber opposite Alastair Sim in the 1951 film Scrooge (US: A Christmas Carol, 1951) and a Cockney charwoman who inherits a fortune in the television series Mrs Thursday (1966–67).

== Life and career ==
Born in Blackburn, Lancashire, Harrison was brought up in London, her father having become borough engineer for Southwark. She was educated at Clapham High School before training at the Royal Academy of Dramatic Art (1914–15). She spent some years living in Argentina and Madeira before making her professional acting debut in the UK in the 1920s.

Harrison made her stage debut as Mrs. Judd in The Constant Flirt at the Pier Theatre, Eastbourne in 1926. The following year she appeared in London's West End for the first time as Winnie in The Cage at the Savoy Theatre. Her subsequent West End plays included A Damsel in Distress, Happy Families, The Merchant and Venus, Lovers' Meeting, Line Engaged, Night Must Fall—also acting in the 1937 film version—Flare Path, Ducks and Drakes, The Winslow Boy and Watch It Sailor!.

She had already made her film debut with a minor role in Our Boys (1915), when she appeared in the film Hobson's Choice (1931). Another 50 films followed, including Gaslight (1940), In Which We Serve (1942) and Caesar and Cleopatra (1945), before making her name in later films.

Before and during World War II, she played small parts in numerous British films, including The Ghost Train (1941), Temptation Harbour (1947), and Oliver Twist (1948), and had a small but scene-stealing role as Mrs. Dilber in Scrooge (US: A Christmas Carol, 1951).

Harrison also played Kaney in The Ghoul (1933) and the matriarch in Mrs. Gibbons' Boys (1962), as well as two BBC productions of Charles Dickens's novels, Martin Chuzzlewit (1964) and Our Mutual Friend (1976). She later commented that Dickens was her favourite author. As her cinema appearances became more infrequent, Harrison turned to television. She starred on television as Mrs Thursday (1966–67), a charwoman who inherits £10 million and the controlling interest in a major company.

=== The Huggett family ===
The Huggett family made their first appearance in Holiday Camp (1947). Harrison played the London East End charwoman Mrs Huggett. The actress continued with the role, alongside Jack Warner as her screen husband, in Here Come the Huggetts (1948), Vote for Huggett and The Huggetts Abroad (both 1949), as well as a radio series, Meet the Huggetts, which ran from 1953 to 1961. Although disliked by critics, almost immediately it became one of the most popular programmes of its day. Harrison turned down the title role in writer Jeremy Sandford's Play for Today Edna, the Inebriate Woman (1971).

Harrison also starred with Warner in the film Home and Away (1956), about a working-class family that wins the football pools.

== Personal life ==
Harrison married John Henry Back in 1916; the couple had three children, two sons, and a daughter. She always pretended to be six years younger than her age, but in 1992 she owned up to reaching 100 and received her telegram from the Queen. Harrison died in 1995 at the age of 103. She was predeceased by her husband, John, and a son.

== Filmography ==
Motion pictures
Year	Title	Role	Notes
1931	Hobson's Choice	Ada Figgins	
1932	Detective Lloyd	Minor role	Uncredited
1932	Aren't We All?	Unspecified	Uncredited
1932	A Blonde Dream	Unspecified	Uncredited
1933	The Man from Toronto	Martha	
1933	The Ghoul	Kaney	
1934	The Great Defender	Agnes Carter – Locke's maid	
1934	What Happened Then?	Mrs. Munday	Uncredited
1935	Inside the Room	Nurse	Uncredited
1935	Dandy Dick	Jane (the maid)	Uncredited
1935	Line Engaged	Maid	
1936	Jury's Evidence		
1936	Broken Blossoms	Mrs. Lossy	
1936	The Tenth Man	Confused voter	
1936	Everybody Dance	Lucy	
1937	Aren't Men Beasts!	Annie	
1937	Wanted!	Belinda	
1937	Night Must Fall	Mrs. Terence	
1938	Bank Holiday	May	
1938	Jane Steps Out	Bit role	Uncredited
1938	Convict 99	Mabel	
1938	Almost a Gentleman	Mrs. Barker	
1938	The Terror	Parlor maid	Uncredited
1938	I've Got a Horse	Mabel	
1938	The Outsider	Mrs. Coates	
1939	A Girl Must Live	Penelope	
1939	Home from Home	Mabel	
1939	Who Is Guilty	Polly	
1939	Discoveries	Kitchen maid	
1940	Mad Men of Europe	Bit role	
1940	They Came by Night	Mrs. Lightbody	
1940	Gaslight	Bit role	Uncredited
1940	Tilly of Bloomsbury	Mrs. Welwyn	
1940	The Girl in the News	Cook	
1940	The Flying Squad	Mrs. Schiffan	
1940	Salvage with a Smile	The Housekeeper	Short
1940	A Call for Arms	Mrs. James	Short
1941	The Ghost Train	Miss Bourne	
1941	Major Barbara	Mrs. Price	
1941	The Remarkable Mr. Kipps	Customer	Uncredited
1941	Once a Crook	Auntie	
1941	I Thank You	Cook	
1941	A Letter from Home	The Maid	Short
1942	The Big Blockade	Bit Role	Uncredited
1942	In Which We Serve	Mrs. Blake	
1942	Much Too Shy	Amelia Peabody	
1943	Dear Octopus	Mrs. Glossop	
1943	The New Lot	Keith's Mother	Short – Uncredited
1944	It Happened One Sunday	Mrs. Purkiss	
1945	Waterloo Road	Bit role	Uncredited
1945	Meet Sexton Blake!	Mrs. Bardell	
1945	Great Day	Pub customer	
1945	Caesar and Cleopatra	Egyptian woman	Uncredited
1946	Wanted for Murder	Florrie	
1946	I See a Dark Stranger	Waitress	Uncredited
1946	Carnival	Bit role	Uncredited
1947	Temptation Harbour	Mrs. Slater	
1947	Code of Scotland Yard	Mrs. Catt	
1947	Holiday Camp	Mrs. Huggett	
1948	Oliver Twist	Mrs. Sowerberry	
1948	Bond Street	Ethel Brawn	
1948	The Winslow Boy	Violet – the maid	
1948	Here Come the Huggetts	Ethel Huggett	
1948	The Day Begins Early	Mrs. Huggett	Short
1948	Vote for Huggett	Ethel Huggett	
1949	Now Barabbas	Mrs. Brown	
1949	The Huggetts Abroad	Ethel Huggett	
1949	Landfall	Mona's mother	
1949	The Gay Adventure	Isobel	
1950	Double Confession	Kate	
1950	Waterfront	Mrs. McCabe	
1950	Trio	Emma Brown Foreman	
1951	The Magic Box	Mother in Family Group	
1951	Scrooge	Mrs. Dilber	
1952	The Happy Family	Lillian Lord	
1952	The Pickwick Papers	Rachel Wardle	
1953	Turn the Key Softly	Granny Quilliam	
1953	The Dog and the Diamonds	Mrs. Fossett	
1954	Let's Make Up	Kate	
1955	Where There's a Will	Annie Yeo	
1955	Cast a Dark Shadow	Emmie	
1955	All for Mary	Nannie Cartwright	Harrison repeats her stage performance
1956	It's a Wonderful World	Miss Gilly	
1956	Home and Away	Elsie	
1956	The Big Money	Mrs. Frith	
1957	Seven Thunders	Mme. Abou	
1958	A Cry from the Streets	Mrs. Farrer	
1958	Alive and Kicking	Rosie	
1961	On the Fiddle	Mrs. Cooksley	
1962	Mrs. Gibbons' Boys	Mrs. Gibbons	
1962	The Fast Lady	Mrs. Staggers	
1963	West 11	Mrs. Beckett	
1969	Lock Up Your Daughters!	Lady Clumsey	
1979	The Omega Connection	Elderly lady	

Television
Year	Title	Role	Notes
1954	All for Mary	Nannie Cartwright	TV movie
1956	Rheingold Theatre	Mrs. Mintern	Episode: Treasure in Store
1956	Nude with Violin	Cherry May Waterton	TV movie
1959	BBC Sunday Night Theatre	Mrs. Ashworth	Episode: Waters of the Moon
1959–1960	Theatre Night	Emma Hornett/Gladys Pudney	Episodes: Watch It, Sailor!/How Say You?
1963	Comedy Playhouse	Woman	Episode: Shamrot
1964	Martin Chuzzlewit	Mrs. Prig	TV series
1964	Laughter from the Whitehall	Nannie Cartwright	Episode: All for Mary
1966–1967	Mrs Thursday	Alice Thursday	TV series
1968	Dixon of Dock Green	Kitty Putnam	TV series
1968	BBC Play of the Month	Mrs. Ashworth	Episode: Waters of the Moon
1969	NBC Experiment in Television	Voice	Episode: Pinter People
1973	ITV Sunday Night Theatre	Rose	Episode: The Coffee Lace
1973	Spring & Autumn	Daisy/Ice Cream Vendor	
1973	Stars on Sundays	Mrs. Wardle	Episode: Glories of Christmas
1974	Charles Dickens' World of Christmas		TV movie
1976	Shades of Greene	Mrs. Salmon	Episode: The Case for the Defence
1976	Our Mutual Friend	Henrietty Boffin	TV mini-series
1979	Danger UXB	Mrs. Dollery	Episode: The Quiet Weekend
