= Holiday Camp (film) =

- Theatrical release poster
- Directed by: Ken Annakin
- Written by: Peter Rogers; Muriel Box; Sydney Box
- Story by: Godfrey Winn
- Produced by: Sydney Box
- Starring: Flora Robson; Jack Warner; Dennis Price; Hazel Court; Emrys Jones; Kathleen Harrison; Yvonne Owen; Esmond Knight; Jimmy Hanley; Peter Hammond; Dennis Harkin
- Cinematography: Jack Cox
- Edited by: Alfred Roome
- Music by: Bob Busby
- Production company: Gainsborough Pictures
- Distributed by: General Film Distributors
- Release date: 5 August 1947
- Running time: 97 minutes
- Country: United Kingdom
- Language: English
- Budget: £150,400
- Box office: £184,300 or £166,400

Holiday Camp is a 1947 British comedy drama film directed by Ken Annakin, starring Flora Robson, Jack Warner, Dennis Price, and Hazel Court, and also features Kathleen Harrison and Jimmy Hanley. It is set at one of the then-popular holiday camps. It was the first film to feature the Huggett family, who went on to star in The Huggetts film series.

== Synopsis ==
Set in a Butlin's-style holiday camp on the English coast in contemporary post-war Britain, working class London family the Huggetts have their first visit to a summer holiday camp. The film is a kaleidoscope of events involving the Huggetts and others, including pregnant young girl Valerie Thompson and her boyfriend Michael Halliday, Jimmy Gardner, a sailor whose girlfriend has jilted him, Angela Kirby, a girl looking for a husband, spinster Esther Harman, Steve and Charlie, a pair of dishonest card sharps, and Jeffrey Baker, a murderer on the run. It captures the round of organised leisure activities at the crowded camp and the ever present camp announcements.

Esther, who is holidaying alone and sharing a room with a stranger, Elsie Dawson, recognises the voice of the camp announcer as a former boyfriend. When she eventually finds him, she discovers the correct person, but he was blinded in the First World War. He explains he lost his sight and memory in 1918.

Joan Huggett wins the beauty contest and is immediately targeted by Binky Hardwick, who appears to be one of the more upper-class campers. He then claims to be an investigator looking for the "Mannequin Murderer" but ultimately proves to be the actual killer.

Harry Huggett loses a lot of money playing cards against the swindlers Steve and Charlie, ending up owing them more money than he has. However, his dad Joe wins all the money back a few days later.

== Cast ==
- Flora Robson as Esther Harman
- Dennis Price as Binky Hardwick/Jeffrey Baker
- Jack Warner as Joe Huggett
- Hazel Court as Joan Huggett Martin
- Emrys Jones as Michael Halliday
- Kathleen Harrison as Ethel Huggett
- Jimmy Hanley as Jimmy Gardner
- Yvonne Owen as Angela Kirby
- Esmond Knight as Camp Announcer
- Esma Cannon as Elsie Dawson
- John Blythe as Steve
- Dennis Harkin as Charlie
- Beatrice Varley as Valerie's aunt
- Jeannette Tregarthen as Valerie Thompson
- Peter Hammond as Harry Huggett
- Susan Shaw as Patsy Crawford
- Maurice Denham as camp doctor
- Jane Hylton as receptionist
- Pamela Bramah as beauty queen
- Jack Raine as detective
- Reginald Purdell as redcoat
- Alfie Bass as redcoat
- Patricia Roc as herself
- Charlie Chester as himself
- Gerry Wilmot as himself
- Diana Dors as dancer
- M. E. Clifton James as guest

== Development ==
The film was directed by Ken Annakin, who had made a number of documentaries for producer Sydney Box, including one that involved him directing actors. When Box took over Gainsborough Pictures he hired Annakin to make Holiday Camp as part of a ten-picture contract with the director. It was part of Box's initial slate of pictures for the company, others including Jassy and Good Time Girl.

The idea was to make a film about a week in a holiday camp consisting of six separate stories. The original story was by magazine writer Godfrey Winn. He went to a Butlin's holiday camp at Filey with Annakin to research. Annakin remembers Winn "put together a very good story" but Sydney and Muriel Box "decided we should add extra elements". He says Muriel Box worked on the Dennis Price character Binky Hardwick, inspired by the Heath Murders, then they held a round table conference with Ted Willis, Peter Rogers and Mabel Constanduros. "Godfrey wasn't terribly happy about it because he thought he was going to have a single screen credit", says Annakin.

Peter Rogers had worked as Muriel Box's assistant. He says he wrote "the screenplay and most of the stories... but Mabel Constanduros and one or two other people had little ideas. Sydney [Box] was always on the side of writers and always gave writers credit, even if they just had two lines in the script." Rogers claims it was his idea to introduce the Dennis Price character and "the only bit that Mabel Constanduros contributed was the scene between Jack Warner and Kathleen Harrison on the cliffs."

== Production ==
Camp exteriors were shot at Butlin's, Filey. The opening scenes of a train arriving at a seaside cliff-top station and of the passengers boarding buses outside the station were filmed at Sandsend railway station.

Sydney Box used the film to introduce several new actresses, including Susan Shaw and Hazel Court. It was Diana Dors' second film appearance. She was only fifteen years old and Annakin says "she had terrific joi de vivre and radiated sex... she was bursting with love for everyone and every living thing."

Some brief moments of Warner and Harrison exercising from the film, and Michael Shepley playing golf, were re-used at the beginning of Into the Blue (1950).

Annakin says the release of the film was threatened by Billy Butlin, who was unhappy with the plot about a murderer frequenting the camp, and said he would cause legal trouble. However, Annakin discovered that people often drowned in the pools at Butlin’s Camps and threatened to leak this information to the press. Butlin then backed off.

== Reception ==
=== Box office ===
The film was the sixth most popular movie at the British box office in 1947.

According to one account, the producer's receipts from the UK were £141,900 while those from overseas were £24,500. Annakin said the film went into profit within three months of its release.

Annakin attributed the film's success in part "perhaps because I had come from documentary and British cinema at that time was very artificial. The Huggetts absolutely caught the spirit and feeling that existed after the war... People didn't want more fairy stories; they wanted something in which they could recognise themselves. Being of lower-middle-class origins myself, I felt at home with these people who were having a fine holiday in a very cheap place which provided wonderful entertainment. I think I caught the spirit of the holiday camps and we had a very warm, natural cast."

Peter Rogers thought the film was a hit "the same way that the Carry Ons caught on – you've got ordinary people doing amusing things." According to Rank's own records the film had made a profit of £16,000 for the company by December 1949.

=== Critical ===
The Monthly Film Bulletin wrote: "This is a film built around the authentic atmosphere of a holiday camp with its regimented gaiety and heartaches. It has humour, sentiment and suspense, with no pretence of offering anything to linger in the memory. Dennis Price is convincing as the murderer posing as a Squadron-Leader and Hazel Court appealing as the heroine. The rest are just types which one sees everyday and that simple statement is probably a tribute to the unobtrusive skill of the director."

Time Out wrote, "Time has mellowed the documentary quality of the film, and location shooting and authentic detail now seem less important than the presence of the whole range of British acting talent, from Dame Flora Robson to Cheerful Charlie Chester, among the cast of thousands."

"I'm not embarrassed about Holiday Camp", said Annakin years later, "although the later Huggett films don't hold up well." Annakin later said he was approached to make a similar sort of film set in Las Vegas but it was never made.

== Citations ==
- Annakin, Ken (2001). So you wanna be a director?. Tomahawk Press.
- Brian McFarlane, An Autobiography of British Cinema, Methuem Film, 1997
