= Jack Warner (actor) =

British actor (1895–1981)

Jack Warner OBE MSM
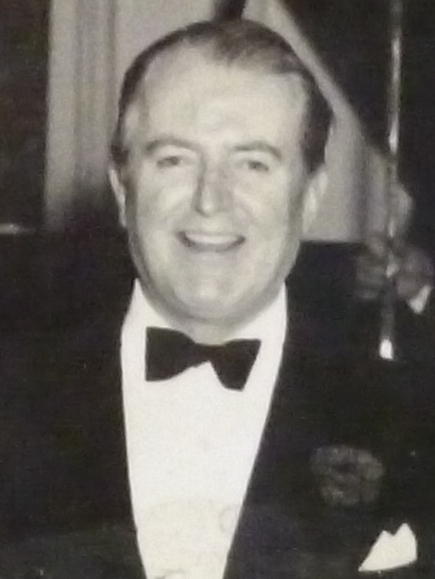
- Warner in 1953
- Born: Horace John Waters; 24 October 1895; Bromley-by-Bow, London, England
- Died: 24 May 1981 (aged 85); London, England
- Resting place: East London Cemetery, London, England
- Occupation: Actor
- Years active: 1943–1978
- Known for: Dixon of Dock Green
- Spouse: Muriel Peters (m. 1933)

Jack Warner (born Horace John Waters; 24 October 1895 – 24 May 1981) was a British actor. He is closely associated with the role of PC George Dixon, which he played in the 1950 film The Blue Lamp and later in the television series Dixon of Dock Green from 1955 until 1976, but he was also, for some years, one of Britain's most popular film stars. He also periodically made novelty records—comic songs or collections related to his Dixon role—such as his 1958 recording of "An Ordinary Copper" which was released by Oriole Records and reissued twice afterwards.

== Early life ==
Warner was born Horace John Waters in Bromley-by-Bow, Poplar, London, the third child of Edward William Waters, master fulling maker and undertaker's warehouseman, and Maud Mary Best. His sisters, Elsie and Doris Waters, were comediennes who usually performed as "Gert and Daisy".

Warner attended the Coopers' Company's Grammar School for Boys in Mile End, while his sisters both attended the nearby sister school, Coborn School for Girls in Bow. The three children were choristers at St Leonard's Church in Bromley-by-Bow, and for a time, Warner was the choir's soloist.

After leaving school, he studied automobile engineering at the Northampton Institute (now part of City St George's, University of London) but, being more practical than academic, he left after a year to work at the repair facilities of F.W. Berwick and Company in Balham, where he started by sweeping the floors for 2d per hour. Frederick William Berwick became a partner in the Anglo-French automobile manufacturing company Sizaire-Berwick and, in August 1913, Warner was sent to work as a mechanic in Paris. He drove completed chassis to the coast from where they were shipped to England, road-testing them en route. He acquired a working knowledge of French which stood him in good stead throughout his life; an imitation of Maurice Chevalier became a part of his repertoire.

During the First World War, he served in France as a driver in the Royal Flying Corps and was awarded the Meritorious Service Medal in 1918. He returned to England and the motor trade in 1919, graduating from hearses to occasional car racing at Brooklands, where he maintained and sometimes raced Henrietta Lister's Aston Martin. He was over thirty before he became a professional entertainer.

== Career ==
Warner first became known to the general public in music hall and radio. By the early years of the Second World War, he was nationally known and starred in a BBC radio comedy show, Garrison Theatre, invariably opening with "A Monologue Entitled...".

== Film ==
Warner's first film was The Dummy Talks (1943), in which he had the lead role. He had a support role in The Captive Heart (1946), a successful film. Also successful were Hue and Cry and Dear Murderer (both 1947). Warner was the patriarch of the Huggett family in Holiday Camp (1947) which was a big hit. He played a policeman in It Always Rains on Sunday (1947), and was another family man in the comedy Easy Money (1948).

He was in a war film, Against the Wind (1948), and starred in a thriller, My Brother's Keeper (1948). The Huggett family had been so well received in Holiday Camp that production company Gainsborough Pictures decided to give them their own series, so Warner was seen in Here Come the Huggetts (1948), Vote for Huggett (1949) and The Huggetts Abroad (1949). He was one of several names in Train of Events and played the governor of a borstal institution in Boys in Brown (both 1949).

Warner was by now established as one of the most popular British actors in the country. His stock rose further when he played PC George Dixon pursuing young hoodlum Dirk Bogarde in The Blue Lamp (1950), the most successful film at the box office that year. One observer predicted, "This film will make Jack the most famous policeman in Britain."

Warner performed in a comedy Talk of a Million (1951) and a thriller Valley of Eagles (1951). He had a small part in Scrooge (1951) then played a policeman again in Emergency Call (1952). He was one of several stars in Meet Me Tonight (1952) and returned to comedy for Those People Next Door (1953). He was top-billed in The Square Ring and The Final Test (both 1953). In the POW film Albert R.N. (1953) he was billed beneath Anthony Steel.

Additional thrillers followed: Bang! You're Dead (1954) and Forbidden Cargo (1954). He co-starred in the Hammer film version of The Quatermass Xperiment (1955) and had a cameo-like supporting role as the police superintendent in the 1955 Ealing Studios black comedy The Ladykillers.

Even with his success that followed in television, Warner performed in the occasional film such as Now and Forever (1956), Home and Away (1956), Carve Her Name with Pride (1958) and Jigsaw (1962). His last film appearance was in Dominique (1979).

== Television ==
Warner was interviewed by Christopher Chataway for Panorama in September 1957, on which he was appearing as President of The Sunday Freedom Association, to advocate for the revision of UK law known as The Sunday Observance Act.

Although the police constable he played in The Blue Lamp was shot dead in the film, the character was revived in 1955 for the BBC television series Dixon of Dock Green, which ran until 1976. However, in the series' later years, Warner's character became ridiculed, and the series no longer supported by the police, since Warner at 80 was so obviously well past compulsory retirement age, although supposedly confined to a less active desk sergeant role. The series had a prime-time slot on Saturday evenings, and always opened with Dixon giving a brief soliloquy to the camera, beginning with the words "Good evening, all". At the conclusion of the episode, Dixon would once again address the camera, this time reflecting on the previous events or describing what occurred afterwards. According to Warner's autobiography, Jack of All Trades, Queen Elizabeth II once visited the television studio where the series was made, and told Warner "that she thought Dixon of Dock Green had become part of the British way of life".

== Personal life ==
In 1933, Warner married company secretary Muriel Winifred ("Mollie"), daughter of independently wealthy Roberts Peters. The couple had no children.

Warner was appointed an Officer of the Order of the British Empire (OBE) in 1965. In 1973, he was made a Freeman of the City of London. Warner commented in his autobiography that the honour "entitles me to a set of 18th century rules for the conduct of life urging me to be sober and temperate". Warner added, "Not too difficult with Dixon to keep an eye on me!"

He died, aged 85, of pneumonia in the Royal Masonic Hospital, Ravenscourt Park, Hammersmith, London, in 1981. The characterisation by Warner of Dixon was held in such high regard that officers from Paddington Green Police Station bore the coffin at his funeral.

== Filmography ==
Year	Title	Role	Notes
1943	The Dummy Talks	Jack	
1946	The Captive Heart	Cpl. Horsfall	
1947	Hue and Cry	Nightingale	
1947	Dear Murderer	Insp. Penbury	
1947	Holiday Camp	Joe Huggett	
1947	It Always Rains on Sunday	Detective Sergeant Fothergill	
1948	Easy Money	Philip Stafford	
1948	Against the Wind	Max Cronk	
1948	My Brother's Keeper	George Martin	
1948	Here Come the Huggetts	Joe Huggett	
1949	Vote for Huggett	Joe Huggett	
1949	The Huggetts Abroad	Joe Huggett	
1949	Train of Events	Jim Hardcastle	(segment: "The Engine Driver")
1949	Boys in Brown	Governor	
1950	The Services Show		TV series
1950	The Blue Lamp	PC George Dixon	
1951	Talk of a Million	Bartley Murnahan	
1951	Valley of Eagles	Inspector Peterson	
1951	Scrooge	Mr. Jorkin	
1952	The Monster of Killoon	Bill Anderson	TV movie
1952	Emergency Call	Inspector Lane	
1952	Meet Me Tonight	Murdoch: Ways and Means	
1953	Those People Next Door	Sam Twigg	
1953	The Square Ring	Danny Felton	
1953	The Final Test	Sam Palmer	
1953	Albert R.N.	Capt. Maddox	
1954	Bang! You're Dead	Bonsell	
1954	Forbidden Cargo	Maj. Alec White	
1955	The Quatermass Xperiment	Insp. Lomax	
1955	The Ladykillers	The Superintendent	
1955	Dixon of Dock Green	P.C. (later Sgt) George Dixon	TV series (432 episodes: 1955–1976)
1956	Now and Forever	Mr. J. Pritchard	
1956	Home and Away	George Knowles	
1957	The Big Gamble (from BBC series 'Eye to Eye')	Commentary	One 1/2 hour narration within the short series.
1958	Carve Her Name with Pride	Mr. Bushell	
1960	Upgreen – And at 'Em		
1962	Jigsaw	Det. Insp. Fred Fellows	
1979	Dominique	George	(final film role)

=== Box-office ranking ===
For a number of years, British film exhibitors voted him among the top ten British stars at the box office via an annual poll in the Motion Picture Herald.

- 1948 – 7th-most popular British star
- 1949 – 10th-most popular British star
- 1950 – 3rd (5th-most popular overall)
- 1952 – 8th-most popular British star
- 1953 – 7th-most popular British star
