= Antony Hopkins =

English composer, pianist and conductor (1921–2014)

Antony Hopkins CBE (born Ernest William Antony Reynolds; 21 March 1921 – 6 May 2014) was a composer, pianist, and conductor, as well as a writer and radio broadcaster. He was widely known for his books of musical analysis and for his radio programmes Talking About Music, broadcast by the BBC from 1954 to 1992, first on the Third Programme, later Radio 3, and then on Radio 4.

== Life and career ==
Hopkins was born Ernest William Antony Reynolds in London. Following the death of Antony's father in 1925, the headmaster at Berkhamsted School, Major Thomas Hopkins, and his wife volunteered to take the five-year-old Antony under a joint guardianship agreement; seven years later they officially adopted him, and his surname was changed to Hopkins. In 1937 he went to a summer school for pianists in Schwaz on the Innthal in Austria, where, hearing a performance of Schubert's Op. 90 Impromptus, D. 899, he was inspired with the desire to become a musician.

Hopkins entered the Royal College of Music (RCM) in 1939, where he studied harmony with Harold Darke and composition with Gordon Jacob. After an unsatisfactory start in his piano studies, he left his teacher to study under Cyril Smith. He also studied organ (though he described himself as "the world's worst organist"). He won several scholarships as well as the Chappell Gold Medal for piano and the Cobbett Competition for chamber music composition. While still studying at the RCM, he became involved with the choir at Morley College, conducted by Michael Tippett who also gave Hopkins informal lessons in composition. In 1944 Tippett passed to Hopkins the job of composing incidental music for a production of Doctor Faustus at the Liverpool Playhouse; following its success, Louis MacNeice asked Hopkins to write incidental music for a radio play. For the next 15 years, Hopkins earned his living mostly from composing.

Hopkins's first opera, Lady Rohesia (1947), based on the Ingoldsby Legends supposedly of sixteenth-century England, was staged at Sadler's Wells Theatre in 1948. His other operas include The Man from Tuscany, Three's Company (1953), and Hands Across the Sky. Other works include the ballet Café des Sports; and Scena for soprano and strings (which was later arranged for three solo voices and full orchestra). Hopkins also wrote extensively for films, including Here Come the Huggetts (1948), The Pickwick Papers (1952), Johnny on the Run (1953), The Angel Who Pawned Her Harp (1954), Child's Play (1954), Cast a Dark Shadow (1955), The Blue Peter (1955), Seven Thunders (1957), and Billy Budd (1962).

In November 1953, Hopkins gave a BBC radio talk in which he explained, using musical examples, the intricacies of a Bach fugue. Martin Armstrong in The Listener magazine described Hopkins's programme as "a pyrotechnic display, by which I mean not flashy but brilliant – it did not seem to promise amusing entertainment, yet this was what Mr Hopkins's half-hour analysis was". A producer of the BBC Third Programme, Roger Fiske, subsequently offered Hopkins carte blanche to do whatever he wanted on the radio: Hopkins suggested a half-hour programme on talking about works to be broadcast in the coming week. The resulting series, Talking About Music, ran from 1954 to 1992, and was syndicated to 44 countries.

In 1960, he composed the music for the BBC TV play The Adventures of Alice based on the books Alice's Adventures in Wonderland and Through the Looking-Glass by Lewis Carroll.

In the 1970s, he revived the long forgotten oratorio Ruth (infamous as "the Worst Oratorio in the World") by the English composer George Tolhurst; this was heard again in 2009 on the BBC Radio 3 programme The Choir. From 1952 he was artistic director of the Intimate Opera Company, being replaced by Stephen Manton in 1963 though remaining a director and as music adviser of the company. From 1959 until his death he was President of Luton Music Club, and also from 1994 President of Radlett Music Club.

== Personal life ==
Hopkins was appointed a CBE in 1976 for his services to music. He died on 6 May 2014, in Ashridge, Hertfordshire in England. He was survived by his second wife, Beatrix née Taylor. His first wife, Alison Purves, whom he married in 1947, died in 1991.

== Books ==
- Beating Time – autobiography (1982)
- Downbeat Music Guide
- Music all Around Me
- Musicamusings
- Music Face to Face (with André Previn)
- Pathway to Music
- Sounds of the Orchestra: A Study of Orchestral Texture
- Talking About Concertos
- Talking About Sonatas
- Talking About Symphonies
- The Dent Concertgoer's Companion
- The Nine Symphonies of Beethoven
- The Seven Concertos of Beethoven
- Understanding Music
- The Concertgoer's Companion Volume 1 Bach To Haydn
- The Concertgoer's Companion Volume 2 Holst To Webern

== Articles ==
- 'Talking About Hopkins': Antony Hopkins, CBE, in conversation with Mark Doran, Musical Opinion, March 2011, pp. 14–17.

== Recordings ==
- Talking about Symphonies EMI 12" vinyl LP: CFP 40058
- Talking about Rachmaninoff Jupiter 7" vinyl: jep OC13
- Talking about Bach Jupiter 7" vinyl: jep OC18
- Talking about Beethoven Jupiter 7" vinyl: jep OC23
