= Mabel Constanduros =

English actress and screenwriter (1880–1957)

- Ardath tobacco card, 1935
- Born: Mabel Tilling; 29 March 1880; London, England
- Died: 8 February 1957 (aged 76); Chichester, Sussex, England
- Occupations: Actress, screenwriter
- Spouse: Athanasius Constanduros (d. 1937)
- Children: Three children (only Michael surviving to adulthood)

Mabel Constanduros (née Tilling; 29 March 1880 – 8 February 1957) was an English actress, screenwriter and BBC Radio personality. She gained public notice playing Mrs.Buggins on the radio programme The Buggins Family, which ran from 1928 to 1948. As well as writing the series, she started off playing the whole family as well.

Born in London, Mabel was one of the seven children of Richard Tilling, managing director of the Thomas Tilling bus company and Sophie (née Thorn). She trained under Elsie Fogerty at the Central School of Speech Training, then based at the Royal Albert Hall, London, making her stage debut at the London Coliseum in 1929. She subsequently played a variety of roles in London and on tour, including Mrs. Bones in the light opera Derby Day at the Lyric Theatre, Hammersmith in 1932, and Anne of Cleves in The Rose Without a Thorn at the Duke of York's Theatre in 1933.

Constanduros became a radio celebrity after broadcasting her own sketches in 1925. She also wrote novels, short stories, and co-wrote 29 Acacia Avenue with her nephew Denis Constanduros. After World War II, she played Earthy Mangold in the popular Worzel Gummidge radio serial on the BBC Children's Hour. She also starred in a pre-Archers serial, At the Luscombes, set in Cornwall, written by her nephew Dennis, and broadcast on the West Region of the BBC Home Service from 1948 until 1964.

She appeared on the radio programme Desert Island Discs on 20 March 1944.

Barry Took wrote: "although today her reputation has faded, she was a popular cultural figure between the wars, helping to establish the style and flavour of British radio comedy." She is the subject of a biography, Mother of the BBC (Bloomsbury, 2021) by the academic Jennifer Purcell.

== Selected filmography ==
- Radio Parade (1933)
- Where's George? (1935)
- Stars on Parade (1936)
- Rose of Tralee (1942)
- Variety Jubilee (1943)
- I'll Walk Beside You (1943)
- This Man Is Mine (1946)
- The White Unicorn (1947)
