= Jean Barker (film editor) =

British film editor (1919–2013)

- Born: 20 August 1919; Manchester, Lancashire, England
- Died: 7 June 2013 (aged 93)
- Occupation: Film editor

Jean Barker (20 August 1919 – 7 June 2013) was a British film editor active from the 1940s through the 1960s. She frequently cut director Muriel Box's films.

Barker later resided in Ivybridge, Devon, and died on 7 June 2013, at the age of 93.

== Selected filmography ==
- The Piper's Tune (1962)
- Too Young to Love (1959)
- Subway in the Sky (1959)
- A Novel Affair (1957)
- Loser Takes All (1956)
- Eyewitness (1956)
- Simon and Laura (1955)
- The Beachcomber (1954)
- Both Sides of the Law (1953)
- Tread Softly (1952)
- Mr. Lord Says No (1952)
- Traveller's Joy (1950)
- Once Upon a Dream (1949)
- Quartet (1949)
- The Calendar (1948)
- The Upturned Glass (1947)
