= Noble Savage (disambiguation) =

The noble savage is a literary stock character who embodies the myth of the indigene, outsider, wild human, or "savage other" who has not been "corrupted by civilization and therefore symbolizes humanity's innate goodness.

Noble Savage may also refer to:

- Noble Savage (album), a 1985 album by American heavy metal band Virgin Steele, or its title track
- Noble Savage (film), 2018 Israeli drama film
- The Noble Savage (magazine), American literary magazine, 1960–1962
- The Noble Savage: Allegory of Freedom, 1990 book by Stelio Cro
- The Noble Savage: Jean-Jacques Rousseau, 1754–1762, 1991 biography by Maurice Cranston, second volume of three
- Noble Savages: My Life Among Two Dangerous Tribes: the Yanomamo and the Anthropologists, 2013 book by Napoleon Chagnon
- "Noble Savage", a song by Clutch from the 2015 album Psychic Warfare
