= The Brothers (1947 film) =

1947 British film by David MacDonald

- Original British 1-sheet poster
- Directed by: David MacDonald
- Written by: Muriel Box; Sydney Box adaptation Paul Vincent Carroll; David MacDonald; LAG Strong
- Based on: novel by LAG Strong
- Produced by: Sydney Box
- Starring: Patricia Roc; Will Fyffe; Maxwell Reed; Finlay Currie; John Laurie
- Cinematography: Stephen Dade
- Edited by: Vladimir Sagovsky
- Music by: Cedric Thorpe Davie
- Production company: Triton
- Distributed by: General Film Distributors (UK); Universal Pictures (USA)
- Release dates: May 12, 1947 (Premiere); July 7, 1947
- Running time: 98 minutes
- Country: United Kingdom
- Language: English
- Budget: £162,900
- Box office: £110,000 (by July 1953) or £107,200

The Brothers is a 1947 British film melodrama directed by David MacDonald and starring Patricia Roc, Will Fyffe and Maxwell Reed. It was adapted from the novel of the same title by L. A. G. Strong.

== Plot ==
In the Western Isles of Scotland, a long and murderous grudge exists between two clans, the Macraes and McFarishes. The arrival of a serving girl to work for the Macraes reinflames the conflict and causes an internal power-struggle between two brothers in the Macrae clan.

== Cast ==
- Patricia Roc as Mary
- Will Fyffe as Aeneas McGrath
- Maxwell Reed as Fergus Macrae
- Finlay Currie as Hector Macrae
- John Laurie as Dugald McLeod and Alistair MacDonald
- Andrew Crawford as Willie McFarish
- Duncan Macrae as John Macrae
- Morland Graham as Angus McFarish
- Megs Jenkins as Angustina McFarish
- James Woodburn as Priest
- David McAlister as George McFarish
- Patrick Boxill as The Informer
- David Keir as Postman

== Production ==
=== Development ===
L.A.G. Strong's novel was published in 1932. Strong was a friend of David MacDonald and in 1936 they agreed to make a film of the novel together. Plans were delayed until after the war, during which time MacDonald established himself as a leading documentarian. MacDonald took the project to Sydney Box who was enthusiastic about making it.

Box wanted Ann Todd, star of The Seventh Veil, to play the lead, as the second part of the two-picture million dollar contract she signed in the wake of the success of The Seventh Veil. Daybreak was to be the first and in March 1946 Box said he hoped to star Todd in The Brothers after that film.

Box wanted Emlyn Williams to play John and Michael Redgrave to play Fergus. Emlyn Williams dropped out and was replaced by Eric Portman. Portman refused to make a film with Todd and was replaced by Duncan Macrae. Redgrave dropped out to make Fame is the Spur and was replaced by Maxwell Reed. Todd did not want to work with Reed as she had not enjoyed working with him on Daybreak Patricia Roc played the role instead. Roc was reluctant to take a role refused by Todd but eventually agreed. Her fee was £5,000. (Roc had reportedly been kicked off Diggers Republic – which became Diamond City – because of her involvement in a divorce scandal. She made the film after shooting Canyon Passage in Hollywood.)

MacDonald knew the film would be troublesome censorwise because of the material. "We hope to get by in the French way", said MacDonald. "Rape, murder and nature, that's about all."

=== Filming ===
The unit moved to the Isle of Skye in July 1947. Roc ended up enjoying working on the film and said the role was her favourite, in part because of an eight-week location shoot on the Isle of Skye. Studio work took place at Shepherds Bush in September 1946.

== Release ==
The film premiered at the Gaumont Theatre on Haymarket, London on 12 May 1947.

The film encountered censorship challenges for its release in the US, in part because of its depiction of illicit whisky manufacturing. However Sydney Box managed to get the film passed by the US censors by adding some shots where detectives arrived on the island to break the operation, and filming an ending where the hero and heroine – the "good" characters – survived instead of being murdered.

There were three main changes:

- removal of a seduction scene on a beach
- changing the original tragic ending (Patricia Roc is killed by her lover) to a happier one (she survives)
- addition of a scene where John Laurie admits the collective guilt of the fisherman in the death of a man
- Duncan Macrae is no longer executed by fishermen - it is implied he will be punished legally

== Critical reception ==
Variety described The Brothers as: "Starkly uncompromising... No attempt has been made to win favor of those who cannot stomach a grim story, and even the contemplated happy ending (not in the book) has been discarded in favor of one more logical, It will not be everybody's entertainment, and will do best with discriminating au-diences here and in the U. S. Drawing cards are a fine cast, good story, grand direction and splendid camera work and music score. Patricia Roc contributes her best performance to date, and newcomer Maxwell Reed, establishes himself in a part that would have been a natural for James Mason."

The New York Times wrote, "Patricia Roc is lovely in form and grace, but her hair-dos, her dresses and her expressions smack more of Elstree than of the Hebrides".

=== Box-office ===
According to Rank's own records the film had made a loss of £55,700 for the company by December 1949.

The producer's receipts were £73,500 in the UK and £33,700 overseas.

=== Modern reputation ===
The film's reputation has risen in recent years. An article in The Scotsman praised the film saying:

There is sex, there is violence, there is nudity and there is one of the most shocking killings ever portrayed in a mainstream movie. An informer, who has reported illicit whisky trafficking, is bound hand and foot, with cork floats under his armpits and a fish tied to his cap. He is then sent bobbing out to sea, to await a passing seabird that will spot the fish and dive hundreds of feet to pierce fish, cap and skull in a single fatal movement....The Brothers is... the skeleton in the cupboard no-one talks about. It bears more resemblance to a Quentin Tarantino film than one by Powell and Pressburger.

Producer Christopher Young said "It's slightly bizarre, some very good performances, fantastic cinematography, but quite a strange script, really quite dark."

David Parkinson, a reviewer for the Radio Times, wrote: "while Stephen Dade's images of Skye are highly evocative, precious little passion is generated by orphaned Patricia Roc and Andrew Crawford, even though she's the housekeeper of his deadliest rival (Finlay Currie). Part of the problem is the straightlaced nature of postwar British cinema, which kept emotions firmly in check.;TV Guide called the film a "fair effort with technical talent outweighing the performers"; but Eye for Film found the film "startlingly bold and suggestive for its time...surprisingly gripping."
