= Dora (1933 film) =

1933 British film by St. Jon Legh Clowes

- Directed by: St. John Legh Clowes
- Written by: St. John Legh Clowes
- Cinematography: Sidney Eaton; Roy Fogwell
- Edited by: St. John Legh Clowes
- Production companies: H & S Film Services
- Distributed by: H & S Film Services
- Release date: June 1933
- Running time: 40 minutes
- Country: United Kingdom
- Language: English

Dora is a 1933 British short second feature ('B') comedy film directed and written by St. John Legh Clowes and starring Sydney Fairbrother and Moore Marriott.

The film humorously highlights some of the bizarre regulations of the Defence of the Realm Act 1914 (known as DORA), drawn up during the First World War, but still enforced.

== Plot ==
In a series of dramatised incidents the apparently farcical restrictions of DORA, including early-closing of shops and inconsistencies in food sales and pub licencing hours, are witnessed by a bemused American tourist.

== Cast ==
- Sydney Fairbrother as mother
- Moore Marriott as Thomas Henry Jones
- Dodo Watts as Jean
- Kenneth Kove as chemist
- St. John Legh Clowes
- A. Bromley Davenport as Judge
- Wally Patch as PC William Petty
- Minnie Rayner as customer
- Frank Stanmore as Jupiter
- Hal Walters as newsagent

== Reception ==
Kine Weekly wrote: "The situations in this story of the vagaries of Dora do mot provide fresh material, but the producer has presented some of the more flagrant absurdities in a humorous light. Crisper dialogue would have made the picture more entertaining."

The Daily Film Renter wrote: "Artless medley of nonsense revolving round ridiculous legal anomalies arising out of the Defence of the Realm Act. Featuring variety of familiar players, it contains no story, but seeks to exploit number of absurd situations arising out of adherence by traders to the law. Based on a novel idea, but fails to use that idea to the best advantage. Should raise its quota of laughs in minor halls with very uncritical patrons."
