= Sandra Dorne =

British actress (1924–1992)

- with Maxwell Reed in Marilyn
- Born: Joan Smith; 19 June 1924; Keighley, West Riding of Yorkshire, England
- Died: 25 December 1992 (aged 68); Westminster, London, England
- Other name: Sandra Holt
- Occupation: Actress
- Years active: 1947–1987
- Spouse: Patrick Holt (m. 1954–1992)

Sandra Dorne (born Joan Smith; 19 June 1924 – 25 December 1992) was a British actress.

== Career ==
Also known as Sandra Holt, platinum blonde Dorne trained at the Rank Organisation's "charm school", and was a regular female lead in British B-films in the late 1940s and 1950s. In later years she worked mainly in British television, appearing in such series as Z-Cars, The Avengers and The Third Man. She also starred in Five Go Mad in Dorset, the first episode of the Comic Strip Presents... series broadcast on the opening night of Channel 4 in 1982.

== Personal life ==
Married to the actor Patrick Holt from 1954 until her death, Dorne died on 25 December 1992 at Paddington Community Hospital, Westminster, London. The cause of death was kidney cancer.

== Partial filmography ==
- Eyes That Kill (1947) – Joan
- Saraband for Dead Lovers (1948) – (uncredited)
- A Piece of Cake (1948) – Minor Role (uncredited)
- Once a Jolly Swagman (1949) – Kay Fox
- All Over the Town (1949) – Marlene
- Marry Me! (1949) – Giggly Girl (uncredited)
- Don't Ever Leave Me (1949) – Ruby Baines
- Helter Skelter (1949) – Receptionist
- Golden Arrow (1949) – 2nd Nightclub hostess
- The Miniver Story (1950) – Girl in Tartan, VE Day pub (uncredited)
- The Clouded Yellow (1950) – Kyra
- Traveller's Joy (1950) – Flower Shop Assistant
- Don't Say Die (1950) – Sandra
- Happy Go Lovely (1951) – Betty
- 13 East Street (1952) – Judy
- Hindle Wakes (1952) – Mary Hollins
- The Yellow Balloon (1953) – Iris
- Alf's Baby (1953) – Enid
- The Beggar's Opera (1953) – Sukey Tawdrey
- Wheel of Fate (1953) – Lucky Price
- Marilyn (1953) – Marilyn Saunders
- The Weak and the Wicked (1954) – Stella
- The Good Die Young (1954) – Pretty Girl
- Police Dog (1955) – Blonde
- Alias John Preston (1955) – Sylvia – In Dream / Maria
- The Gelignite Gang (1956) – Sally Morton
- The Iron Petticoat (1956) – Tityana
- Colonel March of Scotland Yard (1956, TV series - The Deadly Gift) - Rosie
- Operation Murder (1957) – Pat Wayne
- Three Sundays to Live (1957) – Ruth Chapman
- Orders to Kill (1958) – Blonde with German Officer
- The Bank Raiders (1958) – Della Byrne
- Not a Hope in Hell (1960) – Diana Melton
- The House in Marsh Road (1960) – Valerie Stockley
- The Amorous Prawn (1962) – Busty Babs
- The Secret Door (1964) – Sonia
- Devil Doll (1964) – Magda
- All Coppers Are... (1972) – Sue's mother
- Joseph Andrews (1977) – Whore in Traffic Jam
- The Playbirds (1978) – Dougan's Secretary
- Five Go Mad in Dorset (1982, TV Series) – Aunt Fanny
- Eat the Rich (1987) – Sandra (final film role)
