= Dear Murderer =

1947 British film by Arthur Crabtree

- Theatrical release poster
- Directed by: Arthur Crabtree
- Written by: Muriel Box; Sydney Box; Peter Rogers
- Based on: play by St. John Legh Clowes
- Produced by: Betty Box executive Sydney Box
- Starring: Eric Portman; Greta Gynt
- Cinematography: Stephen Dade
- Edited by: Gordon Hales
- Music by: Benjamin Frankel
- Production company: Gainsborough Pictures
- Distributed by: General Film Distributors (UK); Universal (US)
- Release date: 29 May 1947
- Running time: 90 minutes
- Country: United Kingdom
- Language: English
- Budget: £125,000
- Box office: £139,000 (by July 1953)

Dear Murderer is a 1947 British film noir crime, drama, thriller, directed by Arthur Crabtree for Gainsborough Pictures, and starring Eric Portman and Greta Gynt. It was written by Muriel Box, Sydney Box and Peter Rogers based on the play by St. John Legh Clowes.

The film has come to be regarded as one of the best movies made under the supervision of Sydney Box at Gainsborough.

== Plot ==
Lee and Vivien Warren are trapped in a nightmare marriage. Vivien is despising, devious and habitually unfaithful while Lee is pathologically jealous. On his return from a lengthy business trip to New York, suspicious after his wife failed to write to him or call, Lee finds several cards addressed to Vivien signed "Love Always" and determines to kill her latest lover, Richard Fenton. He confronts Fenton, who admits to his affair with Vivien, and persuades him to end the relationship by writing her a farewell letter. He then kills Fenton, and stages the scene to look like a suicide, believing he has committed the perfect crime as the letter which Fenton had just written at his dictation has all the appearance of a suicide note.

His scheme goes awry when he discovers immediately after the fact that Vivien and Fenton had in fact broken up some time before, and Fenton had been humouring him by writing the note. He is guilt-stricken at having killed Fenton needlessly, and realises that any suggestion of suicide on Fenton's part in despair over Vivien will now seem absurd to the police. When he discovers that Vivien now has a new beau, Jimmy Martin, he takes the opportunity to frame Martin for the crime, reasoning that this will serve the dual purpose of shifting suspicion away from himself while at the same time getting Vivien's current lover out of the way. While he arranges matters so that all the evidence points to Martin, the policeman in charge of the case, Inspector Pembury, has his doubts about the case but is unable to catch Lee out.

Vivien begs her husband to intercede on Martin's behalf, promising to remain faithful in the future if he can devise a way to save Martin from the gallows without incriminating himself. Lee changes his testimony to the police to say that Fenton had died of suicide but that he had later manipulated the crime scene to look like he was murdered by Martin. Vivien convinces Lee to write a letter, which, unbeknownst to him, is intended to act as a suicide note. She gives him a drink containing an overdose of his regular medications. While Lee is dying, Vivien confesses to lying to him and that she only loved Martin. She attempts to reunite with Martin, held in prison, who wants nothing to do with her. He has reunited with his supportive ex-girlfriend, Fenton's sister, Avis. Vivien returns dejectedly back to her apartment and, despite initially feigning distress at her husband's death, is arrested by Pembury for Lee's murder. Her lover Jimmy Martin's ring is given back to her stating 'til death do us part'. The film ends with her laughing cruelly, symbolising her downfall into madness.

== Cast ==
- Eric Portman as Lee Warren
- Greta Gynt as Vivien Warren
- Dennis Price as Richard Fenton
- Maxwell Reed as Jimmy Martin
- Jack Warner as Insp. Pembury
- Hazel Court as Avis Fenton
- Jane Hylton as Rita
- Andrew Crawford as Sgt. Fox
- John Blythe as Ernie

== Production ==
It was one of the first films made at Gainsborough Pictures after Sydney Box took over as head of production. The adaptation was very faithful to the script. Filming took place in late 1946 at Islington Studios. It was produced by Sydney's sister Betty.

The cast included two young actors whom Box was trying to build into stars, Maxwell Reed and Hazel Court. Both were from his acting company, The Company of Youth.

== Reception ==
The movie was given a Royal Command Performance in Oslo, Norway.

The Monthly Film Bulletin wrote: "The plot of the film is ambitious, but the whole thing compares unfavourably with Take My Life, in which Greta Gynt scored a success recently. It lacks humour and there is not one pleasant character among the protagonists, who are unconvincing, wooden and often inconsistent. However, the film is quite absorbing, and its deficiencies are more apparent in retrospect."

The Glasgow Herald wrote: The film was well received for its tautness and ingenuity, with one reviewer noting: "Dear Murderer is a shrewd, semi-psychological thriller with Eric Portman, a well-known menace...being sinister to the height of his bent. The plot is good and chilling."

The Baltimore Afro-American wrote: "Another masterful picture from overseas, a carefully plotted dramatic thriller which revolves very neatly about the commission of the perfect crime."

== Attempted murder trial ==
The movie featured in a 1949 trial. Arthur Colyer was arrested for attempted murder of his wife. His wife was accused of passing off the plot for Dear Murderer as evidence, although she denied it.
