= Sam Kydd =

British actor (1915–1982)

- Born: Samuel John Kydd; 15 February 1915; Belfast, Ireland
- Died: 26 March 1982 (aged 67); London, England
- Occupation: Actor
- Years active: 1945–1982
- Spouse: Pinkie Barnes (m. 1952)
- Children: Jonathan Kydd

Samuel John Kydd (15 February 1915 – 26 March 1982) was a British actor. He appeared in more than 290 films, more than any other British actor, including 119 between 1946 and 1952.

His best-known roles were in two major British television series of the 1960s, as the smuggler Orlando O'Connor in Crane and its sequel Orlando. He also played a recurring character in Coronation Street. Kydd's first film was The Captive Heart (1946), in which he played a POW.

== Early life and career ==
An army officer's son, Kydd was born on 15 February 1915 in Belfast, Ireland. He moved to London as a child. He was educated at Dunstable School in Dunstable, Bedfordshire. During the mid-1930s Kydd entered various talent contests and was spotted by Oscar Rabin who made him an MC for the Oscar Rabin Band and one of his "Hot Shots".

Early in the Second World War, he went to France with the British Expeditionary Force but was quickly captured, spending the rest of the war in Stalag XX-A, a camp in Toruń in German-occupied Poland. Kydd later wrote of his experiences as a POW in his autobiographical book For You the War Is Over. While held in a forced labour subcamp in Wyrzysk, he learned various Polish phrases through contact with the local Polish population and bartered with them illegally, on one occasion spending a month in solitary confinement on bread and water. He caught tuberculosis.

During his internment in the German prisoner-of-war camp, where he remained for the next five years, he played a prominent part in the camp's theatrical activities, acting in, devising and staging plays. He felt so strongly about his work there that, when he was offered repatriation after three years, he turned it down to continue with his theatrical work. In recognition of his valuable services during these years, he was awarded a pair of drama masks, made by the Red Cross from barbed wire.

== Career ==
Returning to Britain after the war, Kydd auditioned for the film The Captive Heart (1946), which was about life in a prison camp, and as this was an area where he had much experience, he got a part as an advisor cum actor. He went on to appear in more than 290 films and over 1,000 TV plays and series, including films The Blue Lamp (1950), Father Brown (1954), The 39 Steps (1959) and I'm All Right Jack (1959).

He was versatile and often played the part of a strong and resilient cockney, though he made many appearances portraying Irishmen as well, in both comedy and drama. He appeared as a character actor in films such as Chance of a Lifetime (1950), The Cruel Sea (1953), Reach for the Sky (1956), The Yangtse Incident (1957), The Hound of the Baskervilles (1959), Too Many Crooks (1959), Sink the Bismarck! (1960), Smokescreen (1964), Island of Terror (1966), Too Late the Hero (1970), Steptoe and Son Ride Again (1973) and Eye of the Needle (1981). He also appeared in the big-screen versions of Dad's Army and Till Death Us Do Part.

In 1963, Kydd appeared as the lovable smuggler Orlando O'Connor in Crane starring Patrick Allen as a Briton who moved to Morocco to run a cafe and had an aversion to smuggling. The programme ran for 39 episodes and was watched each week by over 16 million viewers. Kydd's character was so popular that when Crane finished he was given his own programme, Orlando, a children's adventure series which ran for 76 episodes 1965–1968.

He also appeared on TV in The Adventures of Robin Hood, The Pickwick Papers, Mess Mates, The Arthur Askey Show, The Benny Hill Show, The Charlie Drake Show, The Harry Worth Show, The Expert, 11 different characters in Dixon of Dock Green, Fossett Saga, Curry and Chips, The Tony Hancock Show, Hancock's Half Hour , Minder, Crossroads, Coronation Street (playing the part of Mike Baldwin's father, Frankie), The Eric Sykes Show and Follyfoot.

He was the subject of This Is Your Life in January 1974, when he was surprised by Eamonn Andrews. The reserve recorded version, was abruptly broadcast in place of the live feed of the intended subject that night, author Richard Gordon, who declined to take any part in the show's format and the tribute to Richard, was quickly abandoned several minutes into airng, leaving Kydd's tribute, shorter than was oroginally intended.

== Personal life ==
Kydd married Pinkie Barnes, at Kensington Register Office she was an ex-international table tennis champion (she was World Doubles Finalist in 1948) and became one of Britain's first women advertising copywriters. Their only child, is son, Jonathan Kydd, who became an actor.

Kydd was an avid Chelsea F.C. supporter from his time living in Shepherd's Bush, and had a trial for Queens Park Rangers F.C. and played at Lord's cricket ground for charity.

Kydd died at Queen Mary's Hospital, Roehampton in London on 26 March 1982, aged 67. Jonathan, recalled in his tribute, 'Remember Sam Kydd' that his father was an "extremely heavy smoker, perhaps up to 80 a day", and gave the cause of death as smoking related emphysema.

== Memoirs ==
Jonathan Kydd has edited four volumes of his father's memoirs, Sam Kydd: The Unpublished Memoirs, the first of which to be published was Volume 1: Be a Good Boy Sam, 1945–1952 in 2021. He has also created a website for him.

== Selected filmography ==
- The Captive Heart (1946) as POW in Top Bunk (uncredited)
- They Made Me a Fugitive (1947) as Eddie (uncredited)
- Fortune Lane (1947) (uncredited)
- A Song for Tomorrow (1948) as Sergeant
- Trouble in the Air (1948) (uncredited)
- Colonel Bogey (1948) Bit Role (uncredited)
- To the Public Danger (1948) as Police Driver
- Love in Waiting (1948) Bit Part (uncredited)
- It's Hard to Be Good (1948) as Husband (uncredited)
- Scott of the Antarctic (1948) as Leading Stoker E. McKenzie R.N.
- A Piece of Cake (1948) (uncredited)
- The Last Load (1948) as a policeman
- Once a Jolly Swagman (1949) as Johnny Briggs (uncredited)
- Portrait from Life (1949) as Army Truck Driver
- The Small Back Room (1949) as Crowhurst, door sentry
- Badger's Green (1949) (uncredited)
- Forbidden (1949) as Joe
- Floodtide (1949) as Barman (uncredited)
- Passport to Pimlico (1949) as Sapper
- Stop Press Girl (1949) as Railway Ticket Clerk (uncredited)
- Poet's Pub (1949) as George (uncredited)
- Vengeance Is Mine (1949) as Stacey
- Obsession (1949) as Club steward
- Trottie True (1949) as 'Bedford' Stage Manager (uncredited)
- Saints and Sinners (1949) as Man in Bar (uncredited)
- Madness of the Heart (1949) as Soldier at airport
- The Hasty Heart (1949) as Driver (uncredited)
- The Cure for Love (1949) as Charlie Fox
- The Blue Lamp (1950) as Bookmakers Assistant White City (uncredited)
- Chance of a Lifetime (1950) as Worker
- The Body Said No! (1950) as Sam (uncredited)
- Treasure Island (1950) as Cady
- The Miniver Story (1950) as Removal Man (uncredited)
- No Trace (1950) as Mechanic
- Seven Days to Noon (1950) as Soldier in House Search (uncredited)
- Cage of Gold (1950) as Waiter (uncredited)
- Blackout (1950) (uncredited)
- The Magnet (1950) as Postman
- The Clouded Yellow (1950) as Police Radio Operator (uncredited)
- Highly Dangerous (1950) as Customs Man (uncredited)
- The Second Mate (1950) as Wheeler (uncredited)
- The Dark Man (1951) as Sergeant Major
- Mr Drake's Duck (1951) (uncredited)
- Pool of London (1951) as 2nd Engineer (uncredited)
- Captain Horatio Hornblower (1951) as Seaman Garvin (uncredited)
- Penny Points to Paradise (1951) as Porter / Taxi Driver
- Assassin for Hire (1951) as Bert
- The Galloping Major (1951) as Newspaper Vendor (uncredited)
- Hell Is Sold Out (1951) (uncredited)
- Cheer the Brave (1951)
- High Treason (1951) as Sam - Printer (uncredited)
- Mr. Denning Drives North (1951) Minor Role (uncredited)
- Secret People (1952) as Irish Police Sergeant
- Judgment Deferred (1952) as Ambulance Man (uncredited)
- Sing Along with Me (1952)
- Hunted (1952) as Potman
- Angels One Five (1952) as Mess Waiter
- Curtain Up (1952) as Ambulanceman (uncredited)
- Brandy for the Parson (1952) as Lorry Driver
- Derby Day (1952) as Harry Bunn
- The Brave Don't Cry (1952) as Porter
- The Lost Hours (1952) as Fred - mechanic at Bristow & Brown
- The Hour of 13 (1952) as Reporter (uncredited)
- Trent's Last Case (1952) as Inspector Murch
- The Voice of Merrill (1952) as Sgt. Baker
- Hot Ice (1952) as Adams
- Time Bomb (1953) as Train Ticket Clerk (uncredited)
- Appointment in London (1953) as Ackroyd
- The Titfield Thunderbolt (1953) as Policeman (uncredited)
- The Cruel Sea (1953) as Carslake
- Death Goes to School (1953) as Sergeant Harvey (uncredited)
- The Steel Key (1953) as Chauffeur
- Single-Handed (1953) as Naval Rating (uncredited)
- Malta Story (1953) as Soldier (uncredited)
- The Master of Ballantrae (1953) (uncredited)
- The Saint's Return (1953) as Barkley (Joe Podd)
- Love in Pawn (1953) (uncredited)
- They Who Dare (1954) as Marine Boyd
- The Runaway Bus (1954) as Security Officer
- Devil on Horseback (1954) as Darky
- The Rainbow Jacket (1954) as Bruce
- Father Brown (1954) as Scotland Yard Sergeant
- The Embezzler (1954) as Railway Inspector (uncredited)
- The Young Lovers (1954) as Driver, Embassy car JAK711 (uncredited)
- Radio Cab Murder (1954) as George Spencer
- Final Appointment (1954) as Vickery
- Lilacs in the Spring (1954) as Actor in Beaumont Film (uncredited)
- The End of the Road (1954) as First Postal Clerk
- Impulse (1954) as Ticket Inspector (uncredited)
- The Glass Cage (1955) as George
- Raising a Riot (1955) as Messenger (credited as 'Sam Kidd')
- As Long as They're Happy (1955) as Milkman (uncredited)
- Where There's a Will (1955) as Jeep driver
- The Dark Avenger (1955) Minor Role (uncredited)
- The Constant Husband (1955) as Adelphi Barman (uncredited)
- Passage Home (1955) as Sheltia
- A Kid for Two Farthings (1955) (uncredited)
- The Quatermass Xperiment (1955) as Police sergeant questioning Rosie
- One Way Out (1955) as Gang Member (uncredited)
- Josephine and Men (1955) as Desk Sergeant
- The Cockleshell Heroes (1955) as fish lorry driver (uncredited)
- The Ladykillers (1955) as Second Cab Driver (uncredited)
- Portrait of Alison (1955) as Bill, the Telephone Engineer (uncredited)
- Storm Over the Nile (1955) as Joe (uncredited)
- A Town Like Alice (1956) as Australian Driver (uncredited)
- Soho Incident (aka Spin a Dark Web) (1956) as Sam
- It's Never Too Late (1956) (uncredited)
- Ramsbottom Rides Again (1956) (uncredited)
- Jacqueline (1956) as Foreman
- The Long Arm (1956) as Police Constable in Information Room
- Reach for the Sky (1956) as Warrant Officer Blake
- The Baby and the Battleship (1956) as Chief Steward (uncredited)
- It's a Wonderful World (1956) as Attendant
- Home and Away (1956) as Albert West
- Tiger in the Smoke (1956) as Tom Gripper
- Yangtse Incident: The Story of H.M.S. Amethyst (1957) as AB Walker RN
- Carry On Admiral (1957) as Attendant
- You Can't Escape (1957) as Ted the Poacher (uncredited)
- The Long Haul (1957) as Taxi Driver (uncredited)
- The Scamp (1957) as Shopkeeper
- Just My Luck (1957) as Craftsman
- Barnacle Bill (1957) as Frogman
- Dangerous Exile (1957) (uncredited)
- A Tale of Two Cities (1958) as Joe—Coach Guard (uncredited)
- Happy Is the Bride (1958) as Foreman
- The Safecracker (1958) as McCullers
- Orders to Kill (1958)
- Up the Creek (1958) as Bates
- Law and Disorder (1958) as Shorty
- A Question of Adultery (1958) as Court Reporter
- I Was Monty's Double (1958) as Go-Between
- Further Up the Creek (1958) as Bates
- The Captain's Table (1959) as Sailor Opening Water Valve (uncredited)
- Too Many Crooks (1959) as Tramp (uncredited)
- Make Mine a Million (1959) as Mail Van Robber (uncredited)
- Carlton-Browne of the F.O. (1959) as Signaller
- The 39 Steps (1959) as Train Steward (uncredited)
- The Hound of the Baskervilles (1959) as Perkins
- I'm All Right Jack (1959) as Shop Steward
- Upstairs and Downstairs (1959) as Driver (uncredited)
- Libel (1959) as Newspaper Vendor (uncredited)
- Sink the Bismarck! (1960) as Civilian Worker on 'Prince of Wales' (uncredited)
- Life Is a Circus (1960) as Removal man
- Dead Lucky (1960) as Harry Winston
- Follow That Horse! (1960) as Farrell
- The Price of Silence (1960) as Slug
- There Was a Crooked Man (1960) as Foreman
- Suspect (1960) as Slater. (Released in the United States as 'The Risk')
- The House in Marsh Road (1960) as Morris Lumley
- The Treasure of Monte Cristo (1961) as Albert
- Clue of the Silver Key (Edgar Wallace Mysteries) (1961) as Tickler
- The Iron Maiden (1962) as Fred Carter
- Smokescreen (1964) as Hotel Waiter
- The Knack ...and How to Get It (1965) as uncredited voiceover
- The Projected Man (1966) as Harry Slinger
- Island of Terror (1966) as Constable John Harris
- Smashing Time (1967) as Workman
- Till Death Us Do Part (1968) as Fred
- The Killing of Sister George (1968) as Taxi Driver (uncredited)
- Moon Zero Two (1969) as Barman
- The Last Grenade (1970) (uncredited)
- Too Late the Hero (1970) as Colour-Sergeant
- 10 Rillington Place (1971) as Furniture Dealer
- Dad's Army (1971) as Nazi Orderly
- Quest for Love (1971) as Taximan
- Up the Chastity Belt (1971) as Locksmith
- The Magnificent Six and 1/2 (1971)
- The Alf Garnett Saga (1972) (uncredited)
- My Name is Harry Worth (1972) T.V. show ( Man with the Flu in Bed )
- Steptoe and Son Ride Again (1973) as Claude
- Confessions of a Window Cleaner (1974) as 1st Removal Man
- Great Expectations (1974) as Arthur Compeyson (scarred convict)
- The Amorous Milkman (1975) as Wilf
- Confessions of a Driving Instructor (1976) as Mr.Gibson (scenes deleted)
- Yesterday's Hero (1979) as Sam Turner
- Coronation Street (1980–1982) as Frank Baldwin, 12 episodes
- Danger on Dartmoor (1980)
- The Shillingbury Blowers (1980) as Reggie
- The Mirror Crack'd (1980) as Film Technician (uncredited)
- Eye of the Needle (1981) as Lock Keeper

=== Television ===
| Year | Title | Role | Notes |
|---|---|---|---|
| 1960-1962 | Mess Mates | 'Croaker' Jones | All 40 Episodes |
| 1963-1965 | Crane | Orlando O’Connor | All 39 Episodes |
| 1965 | Orlando | Orlando O'Connor/Moosh | All 76 Episodes |
| 1969 | Curry and Chips | Smellie | 4 Episodes |
| 1973 | Freewheelers | Phil | Series 8, 8 Episodes |
| 1979 | Sally Ann | Pike | All 8 Episodes |
