= The Master Plan (1954 film) =

British film by Cy Endfield

- Directed by: Cy Endfield
- Screenplay by: Cy Endfield
- Based on: Operation North Star by Harald Bratt
- Produced by: Charles Leeds; Steven Pallos
- Starring: Wayne Morris; Tilda Thamar; Norman Wooland
- Cinematography: Jonah Jones
- Edited by: Jim Connock
- Production company: Gibraltar Films
- Distributed by: Grand National Pictures
- Release date: 15 August 1954
- Running time: 78 minutes
- Country: United Kingdom
- Language: English

The Master Plan is a 1954 British second feature espionage thriller film directed by Cy Endfield and starring Wayne Morris, Tilda Thamar and Norman Wooland. It was written by Enfield based on the teleplay Operation North Star by Harald Bratt.

== Plot ==
Following the Second World War, an American army officer stationed in West Germany is assigned with keeping classified information away from the Communists. Unfortunately, enemy agents know that he suffers from sudden black-outs and use this to hypnotise him, and make it appear that he is a traitor.

== Cast ==
- Norman Wooland as Colonel Mark Cleaver
- Tilda Thamar as Helen Quaid
- Wayne Morris as Major Thomas Brent
- Mary Mackenzie as Miss Gray
- Arnold Bell as General Harry Goulding
- Marjorie Stewart as Yvonne Goulding
- Laurie Main as Johnny Orwell
- Frederick Schrecker as Doctor Morganstern
- Richard Marner as man
- Alan Tilvern as Otto Szimek
- Lucienne Hill as Kathleen Steffanson
- John Gabriel as Dr. Horn

== Production ==
The film was made at Southall Studios with sets designed by the art director Scott MacGregor.

== Critical reception ==
The Monthly Film Bulletin wrote: "Unpretentious East-West espionage story in a continental setting. The locale and atmosphere are fairly convincing and the plot is adequately sustained, but credibility is ignored towards the end, when a prowler is loose in the well-guarded grounds and, although armed with a rifle with telescopic sights, fails to kill at twenty yards range."

Kine Weekly wrote: "The picture, which, incidentally, far from flatters Military Intelligence, is little but talk for the first hour. Wayne Morris, sound as the roughly handled Tom, Norman Wooland, all agog as Cleaver, and Tilda Thamar, Mary Mackenzie and Marjorie Stewart, suitably contrasted as the women, try to keep the conversation clear and crisp, but it is only during the last 20 minutes that sparks fly. The denouement is, however, first rate theatre and gets the headline hokum over."

TV Guide wrote, "the intriguing story suffers from inefficient production techniques."
