= Mess Mates =

British TV comedy series (1960–1962)

- Genre: Sitcom
- Written by: Talbot Rothwell; Lew Schwarz
- Directed by: Graeme MacDonald; Eric Fawcett; Kenneth Carter
- Starring: Archie Duncan; Sam Kydd; Ronald Hines
- Country of origin: United Kingdom
- Original language: English
- No. of series: 2
- No. of episodes: 40

Production
- Producer: Eric Fawcett
- Running time: 30 minutes
- Production company: Granada Television

Original release
- Network: ITV
- Release: 28 June 1960 – 13 March 1962

Mess Mates is a British comedy television series which originally aired on ITV between 1960 and 1962. It is set on the coastal vessel SS Guernsey where Captain Briskett has to keep a watchful eye on his rowdy and conniving sailors. A number of the scripts were written by Talbot Rothwell shortly before he became the established writer of the Carry On film series.

== Cast ==
=== Main ===
- Archie Duncan as Captain Biskett
- Sam Kydd as 'Croaker' Jones
- Ronald Hines as 'Dapper' Drake
- Dermot Kelly as Blarney Finnigan
- Fulton Mackay as Willie McGuinniss
- Victor Maddern as 'Tug' Nelson
- Frank Atkinson as 'Fry-Up' Dodds
- Michael Balfour as 'Twinkle' Martin

== Bibliography ==
- Wagg, Stephen. Because I Tell a Joke or Two: Comedy, Politics and Social Difference. Routledge, 2004.
