= Nelly Arno =

British actress (1892–1966)

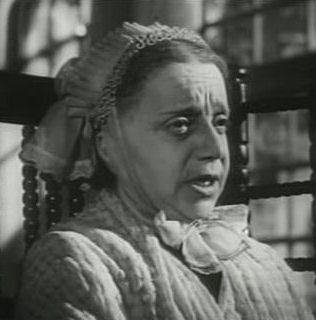
- Nelly Arno in Take My Life (1947)
- Born: Nelli Aronowsky; 15 July 1892; Karlsruhe, Baden-Württemberg, German Empire
- Died: September 1966 (aged 74); Queens, New York City, U.S.
- Citizenship: United Kingdom
- Occupation: Actress

Nelly Aronowsky (15 July 1892 – September 1966), known professionally as Nelly Arno, was a German-born British theatre, film and radio actress.

Aronowsky was born in Karlsruhe to Abraham Aronowsky and Fanny (née Maysel). She had a younger brother, Alexander, born in 1896.

In 1920, she was living in Bernburg and already using the stage name Arno. She was appearing on the English stage and radio productions following the Second World War. It's not apparent when she emigrated, but she became a British citizen in 1948.

She died in Queens, New York in September 1966.

== Selected filmography ==
- Take My Life (1947) – Mrs Rusman
- Portrait from Life (1948) – Anna Skutetsky
- The Lost People (1949) – old woman in box
- The Third Man (1949) – Kurtz's mother (uncredited)
- So Long at the Fair (1950) – Madame Verni
- State Secret (1950) – barber shop manager
- The Last Page (1952) – Miss Rosetti (uncredited)
- Tread Softly (1952)
- Street Corner (1953) – customer at jewelry store (uncredited)
- The Love Lottery (1954) – the Russian woman
- A Prize of Gold (1955) – German landlady
- Three Empty Rooms (BBC TV play, 1955) – Mrs. Elihu
