= Marilyn (1953 film) =

1953 British film by Wolf Rilla

- Theatrical release poster
- Directed by: Wolf Rilla
- Written by: Wolf Rilla
- Story by: Peter Jones (play Marion)
- Produced by: Ernest G. Roy
- Starring: Sandra Dorne; Maxwell Reed
- Cinematography: Geoffrey Faithfull
- Edited by: Peter Seabourne
- Music by: Wilfred Burns
- Production company: Nettlefold Studios
- Distributed by: Butcher's Film Service (UK); Astor Pictures (US)
- Release dates: 1953 (UK); August 1955 (US)
- Running time: 70 minutes
- Country: United Kingdom
- Language: English

Marilyn (U.S. title: Roadhouse Girl) is a 1953 British second feature ('B') film noir directed by Wolf Rilla starring Sandra Dorne and Maxwell Reed. It was written by Rilla based on the play Marion by Peter Jones.

== Plot ==
Drifter mechanic Tom Price lusts after seductive Marilyn, the young wife of ill-tempered garage owner George Saunders. Assuming (correctly) that Marilyn is fooling around with his employee, Saunders angrily confronts him. Defending himself, Tom accidentally kills his boss. Marilyn helps him to cover up the crime – the inquest verdict is "accidental death" – and Marilyn begins a new life, while also keeping Tom at a distance.

Several months later she is running a just-getting-by "American bar". Wealthy businessman Nicky Everton agrees to lend her some money, believing that Marilyn will offer her affections as repayment. Everton later changes his mind as he feels they won't be happy in the longer term; and Price also walks out, frustrated by her erratic behaviour and in particular her lack of lasting commitment to him.

Throughout all this, Rosie, Marilyn's maid, has kept the dark secret of Saunders' death to herself, until she is taken for granted once too often by her self-centred boss. Marilyn is left alone with her hopes and fears. Marilyn approaches Tom, who pushes her aside just as two policemen approach the house.

== Cast ==
- Sandra Dorne as Marilyn Saunders
- Maxwell Reed as Tom Price
- Leslie Dwyer as George Saunders
- Vida Hope as Rosie
- Ferdy Mayne as Nicky Everton
- Hugh Pryse as Coroner
- Kenneth Connor as customer in roadhouse
- Ben Williams as Jury Foreman

== Critical reception ==
The Monthly Film Bulletin wrote: "This well-worn story does not seem to have worn very well. The direction and playing here are unusually heavy-handed and the film – which comes to a remarkably abrupt end – adds up to very little."

In British Sound Films: The Studio Years 1928–1959 David Quinlan rated the film as "mediocre", writing: "Briefly released as Marilyn, this cut-price The Postman Always Rings Twice is not very good under either title."

The Radio Times Guide to Films gave the film 2/5 stars, writing: "Having already been unofficially adapted by Luchino Visconti as Ossessione (1942), James M. Cain's hard-boiled novel The Postman Always Rings Twice was apparently plundered again for this bleak British B-movie. It's a solid enough study in lust, despair and avarice, with Sandra Dorne oozing cynical sensuality as the unhappy wife whose liaison with mechanic Maxwell Reed leads to the death of her grouchy, garage-owning husband Leslie Dwyer."

Marilyn was selected by film historians Steve Chibnall and Brian McFarlane as one of the 15 most meritorious British B films made between World War II and 1970. The authors note that it is "symptomatic of a transatlantic turn in the British 'B'" and praise its depiction of a "pervasive sense of dissatisfaction with things as they are".
