= Don't Panic Chaps! =

- Original British quad poster
- Directed by: George Pollock
- Written by: Jack Davies; Based on the play by Ronald Holroyd, Michael Corston
- Produced by: Teddy Baird; Ralph Bond
- Starring: Dennis Price; George Cole; Thorley Walters
- Cinematography: Arthur Graham; Eric Besche
- Edited by: Harry Aldous
- Music by: Philip Green
- Production companies: Act Films Ltd; Hammer Film Productions
- Distributed by: Columbia Pictures Corporation (UK)
- Release date: 21 December 1959 (UK)
- Running time: 85 minutes
- Country: UK
- Language: English

Don't Panic Chaps! is a 1959 British military comedy film from Hammer Films, directed by George Pollock and starring Dennis Price, George Cole, Thorley Walters and Terence Alexander. The film was written by Jack Davies, based on the play by Michael Corston and Ronald Holroyd, and produced by Teddy Baird for ACT Films. Originally called Carry On Chaps, the title was changed following the success of the Carry On series. Scott McGregor and Tom Goswell were the Art Directors, Peter Aremsten did Makeup and Douglas Hermes was assistant director.

== Plot ==
Just after the Battle of El Alamein somewhere in North Africa, British troops train in enemy plane and ship recognition. They train to operate an inflatable dinghy and are then taken by submarine to an Adriatic island. After setting up camp they discover that the island is the base for a small German unit when one of the British soldiers bumps into a German soldier while both are skinny dipping in the sea.

The British soldiers hunt for the Germans and find a former monastery where they are surprised by a German officer. He explains that his group were guarding stores for re-supplying German submarines but have been forgotten by their superiors and offers to share his supplies and accommodation if the British will agree to a truce. The British soldiers return to their camp to consider the offer and eventually agree to accept when they realise that their food and water are about to run out. They join the Germans at the monastery but both the British NCO Bolter and the German NCO Meister disagree.

The two sides live harmoniously and even find mutual interests, with Finch befriending a German archaeologist and helping on an archaeological dig. One day, while sunbathing, the British officer Brown sees a woman, Elsa, in the sea clinging to some wreckage. He is unable to swim and calls to his men to help him but they ignore his calls. Eventually he jumps in the sea but has to be rescued by the woman. The soldiers talk to her and discover that she is Slavic, and does not understand English, French or German. Finally Finch tries Italian and is able to communicate with her. All the soldiers vie for her attention.

The two NCOs are mutually hostile and eventually leave the monastery for a fist fight. When they are too exhausted to continue, they realise that they agree that their duty as soldiers is to return to their own army so that they can continue fighting. They agree to take the inflatable dinghy and return to the war. However, they are unable to overcome the current and return to the island.

When a submarine finally appears, it is British, and so, as agreed, the British troops go aboard along with Elsa, while the Germans go into hiding. They reflect that had it been a German submarine, they would probably have been sent to the Eastern Front. But no sooner has the British submarine disappeared than a U-boat surfaces. Preferring a life of idleness in the Adriatic to the Eastern Front, they quickly walk away back to the interior of the island.

== Cast ==
- Dennis Price as Krisling
- George Cole as Finch
- Thorley Walters as Brown
- Nadja Regin as Elsa
- Harry Fowler as Ackroyd
- Percy Herbert as Bolter
- George Murcell as Meister
- Nicholas Phipps as Mortimer
- Terence Alexander as Babbington
- Gertan Klauber as Schmidt
- Thomas Foulkes as Voss

== Production ==
It was based on the eponymous BBC radio play and was made for £75,000. It was shot at Walton Studios. The film's sets were designed by the art director Scott MacGregor.

== Reception ==
The Monthly Film Bulletin wrote: "Continuing the spate of British Service farces, this is a poor specimen with a dearth of good gags and situations. The cast can do little to help. Miss Regin speaks not a word of English throughout, while Mr. Cole is reduced at one point to appearing in the nude."

In British Sound Films: The Studio Years 1928–1959 David Quinlan rated the film as "mediocre", writing: "Opportunities for satirical comedy are largely missed in this damp farce."

Leslie Halliwell said: "An ingenious idea is ill-served by a poorly-written script and a rather bored cast."
