= Traveller's Joy =

- Original trade ad by Eric Pulford
- Directed by: Ralph Thomas
- Screenplay by: Allan McKinnon; Bernard Quayle
- Based on: Traveller's Joy by Arthur Macrae
- Produced by: Antony Darnborough associate Alfred Roome
- Starring: Googie Withers; John McCallum; Maurice Denham
- Cinematography: Jack Cox; Len Harris
- Edited by: Jean Barker
- Music by: Arthur Wilkinson
- Production company: Gainsborough Pictures
- Distributed by: General Film Distributors
- Release dates: 26 December 1950 (Sweden); 28 March 1951 (UK)
- Running time: 78 minutes
- Country: United Kingdom
- Language: English
- Budget: £120,000
- Box office: £68,000 (by 1953)

Traveller's Joy is a 1949 British comedy film directed by Ralph Thomas and starring Googie Withers, John McCallum and Maurice Denham. Based on a West End play of the same name by Arthur Macrae, it was the last film released by the original Gainsborough Pictures.

== Premise ==
With extensive restrictions on how much foreign exchange British travellers can take outside the realm (then £5), a variety of English men and women are trapped in Stockholm in the very expensive country of Sweden. These include Bumble and her estranged husband Reggie.

As each struggle with their hotel bills they try to trick others into paying, but as the hardship is widespread the group begins to grow with no-one having the cash to resolve the issue.

The ladies try to trick various men into helping and vice versa.

The problem is ultimately resolved by a Swedish citizen offering accommodation in return for a reciprocal arrangement when he visits Britain. Meanwhile, the various couples regroup.

== Cast ==
- Eric Pohlmann as Gustafsen
- Philo Hauser as Pawnbroker
- Googie Withers as Bumble Pelham
- John McCallum as Reggie Pelham
- Yolande Donlan as Lil Fowler
- Maurice Denham as Fowler
- Colin Gordon as Tom Wright
- Gerard Heinz as Helstrom
- Geoffrey Sumner as Lord Tilbrook
- Peter Illing as Tilsen
- Dora Bryan as Eva the Swedish maid
- Grey Blake as Hotel Receptionist
- Gerik Schjelderup as Bergman
- Gerald Andersen as Carlsen
- Clive Morton as Svensen
- Anthony Forwood as Nick Rafferty
- Antony Holles as Head Waiter
- Sandra Dorne as Flower Shop Assistant

== Production ==
The film was based on a West End play by Andrew Macrae about Englishmen travelling in Europe and the problems experienced by them due to post-war currency restrictions. It premiered at the Criterion on 2 June 1948 starring Yvonne Arnaud and produced by Hugh Beaumont; it was a smash hit, running for two years. Clement Attlee saw the play while he was Prime Minister.

Sydney Box bought the film rights while head of Gainsborough Pictures. The film starred John McCallum and Googie Withers, who had recently married. "We think, it Is an excellent idea to work together," said John. It was the first of a three-picture contract Withers signed with Sydney Box. The job of directing was given to Ralph Thomas, who had just made two comedies for Box, Once Upon a Dream and Helter Skelter.

John McCallum came down with jaundice during filming and had to take a week off. This caused filming to be suspended for a week, costing the production £12,000. However the film was completed half a day under schedule.

== Release ==
Under the terms of the film right contracts, the movie of Traveller's Joy was not allowed to be released until the play finished running. This held up release for over two years. By the time it came out, the topicality of the subject matter had passed and the film was a box office disappointment.

== Critical reception ==
Allmovie wrote, "one suspects that the stage play upon which Travellers Joy was based was slightly more subtle than the film version. Whatever the case, door-slamming farce was really not the forte of either McCallum or Withers, and before long they returned to the heavy drama they did best."
