= Daybreak (1948 film) =

- Theatrical release poster
- Directed by: Compton Bennett
- Written by: Sydney Box; Muriel Box; Monckton Hoffe (adaptation)
- Based on: Grim Fairy Tale by Monckton Hoffe
- Produced by: Sydney Box
- Starring: Eric Portman; Ann Todd; Maxwell Reed
- Cinematography: Reginald Wyer
- Edited by: Peter Price; Helga Cranston; Gordon Hales
- Music by: Benjamin Frankel
- Production company: Sydney Box Productions
- Distributed by: General Film Distributors (UK); Universal (USA)
- Release dates: 18 May 1948 (UK); June 1949 (USA)
- Running time: 75 minutes
- Country: United Kingdom
- Language: English
- Budget: £150,000
- Box office: £130,000

Daybreak is a 1948 British drama film directed by Compton Bennett and starring Eric Portman, Ann Todd and Maxwell Reed. It was written by Muriel and Sydney Box based on the 1946 play Grim Fairy Tale by Monckton Hoffe.

== Plot ==
The story begins with a hangman breaking down when faced with carrying out his last execution of a condemned man before retiring. The hangman begins to tell his story to the governor and the majority of the plot is then played out in the form of an extended flashback – although many scenes take place in which the supposed narrator is not actually present.

Eddie Mendover owns a barber's shop in Gravesend and leads an apparently normal life. However, he has a second role, known to no one but his assistant, Ron – he is, in fact, England's official public hangmen, called on periodically to travel to prisons around the country to perform executions.

He changes his life by making a claim against the estate of Mr Tribe, a barge owner on the Thames. He claims to be his son but has no papers whatsoever to back this claim. One of his father's barge friends is happy to identify Eddie for the price of a few drinks. The solicitor seems happy with this and he inherits 15 barges and a deal of money.

One evening, Eddie goes into his local public house for a drink and a bite to eat and is kind to a stranger who comes in to shelter from the heavy rain. This is the bedraggled Frances who likes to be called Frankie, who is waiting for a bus to take her to a new job at a nightclub. Although Frankie never says a word about her past, there are implications that she has some kind of shady history, and may even have been a prostitute. The pair fall in love and only then does she ask his surname. He is obliged to say Tribe as it is the name on the barge. They are soon married, and he hands over the barber's shop to Ron and assumes control of the business, setting up home with Frankie on one of the barges, at her request.

Eddie hires a Danish seaman, Olaf, to work for him, and the arrogant Olaf loses no time in openly flirting with Frankie. Although somewhat attracted to him, she tries her best to deny these feelings and be the loving and dutiful wife. This, however, is made more difficult by the fact that Eddie is forced to travel to other towns from time to time for two or three days at a time to fulfil his prison-service obligations and as he does not wish to come clean about these he tells Frankie that he must attend important business meetings, leaving her to increasingly struggle to rebuff Olaf's advances.

When Eddie is next called away, Frankie begs him to either not go or take her with him, but as neither is an option for Eddie, she is left alone and pleads with elderly bargeman, Bill Shackle, to stay with her that evening. Shackle is unable to grant her request due to other commitments and Olaf is quick to make himself at home in the cabin and begin drinking.

As a condemned man has been given a reprieve, Eddie returns unexpectedly and discovers Frankie and Olaf in this compromising situation. A fight ensues between the two men, during which Eddie is knocked overboard and fails to resurface. The police arrive and Olaf is arrested for murder, as it is presumed that Eddie's body has been carried away by the tide. In despair, Frankie commits suicide by shooting herself. However, Eddie manages to crawl ashore the next morning and goes to his barber shop to clean himself up. It is unclear how he spent the whole night in the Thames.

Ron is unaware of Eddie's alter ego as Tribe (or his marriage). A customer brings a newspaper in and somehow the story of "Eddie's murder" and Frankie's suicide is already in the paper.

Olaf is convicted of murder and sentenced to hang. Eddie is summoned to carry out the execution, and at first sees it as an opportunity to avenge Frankie's death. When the time comes, however, he is unable to go through with it and confesses his identity to the prison staff. He returns to the barber's shop. When Ron comes to work the next morning, he finds Eddie's dangling body and dials 999.

== Cast ==
- Eric Portman as Eddie Mendover/Tribe
- Ann Todd as Frances ("Frankie")
- Maxwell Reed as Olaf
- Bill Owen as Ron
- Edward Rigby as Bill Shackle
- Jane Hylton as Doris
- Eliot Makeham as Mr. Bigley
- Margaret Withers as Mrs. Bigley
- John Turnbull as Superintendent
- Maurice Denham as Inspector
- Milton Rosmer as Governor

== Production ==
In July 1945 Box bought the screen rights to a story by Monckton Hoffe called Grim Fairy Tale, intending to make it a vehicle for Todd. Box was impressed by the style and themes of psychological cinema made before the war in French cinema, and wanted to do a British film along these lines.

It was the first film of a new 14-picture quarter-million pound contract between Todd and J. Arthur Rank (she was to make six films with Box and eight with Rank). Crawford's casting was announced in January 1946. It was known at one stage as Streets Paved with Water.

=== Shooting ===
Filming started in March 1946 and went for ten weeks. It was the first notable role of Maxwell Reed who had been in The Company of Youth (he later made The Brothers for Box).

Sidney Box's sister Betty worked on the movie. Shooting was difficult with none of the three leads getting along. In April 1946 it was reported that Brock Williams was directing.

=== Post production ===
Box saw a rough cut in July 1946 and was unhappy with the result, particularly Bennett's direction and Todd's performance. Over the next six months, Box reworked the script, particularly the beginning and ending. Alan Osbiston was hired to reshoot scenes and re-edit the movie. In January 1947 Muriel Box was still dissatisfied.

Post production was also difficult because of censor objections. Among the scenes altered were a rape scene, gory details of a fight, and a death cell scene.

Due to difficulties with the censors the film was not seen until almost two years after completion, and only after several cuts were made. Another reason given for the delay was that the producers wanted to wait until Todd's first Hollywood movie, The Paradine Case, had been released.

== Reception ==
=== Box office ===
The film was moderately successful at the British box office but failed to recoup its relatively high cost.

=== Critical ===
The Monthly Film Bulletin wrote: "This is the first film starring Ann Todd to be directed by Compton Bennett since his memorable The Seventh Veil, by comparison with which this offering would seem to be a very old and distant relation. Daybreak is endowed with a monotonous script, which seems to go out of its way to promote an atmosphere of unrelieved gloom and despondency. Ann Todd is worthy of better material than this, although Eric Portman and the rest of the cast seem to be thoroughly at home from start to finish."

Kine Weekly wrote: "The central idea is novel, but an uneven cast and muddled direction prevent it from being effectively exploited. Unbelievable and dishevelled, it will leave the majority of audiences cold. ... The story starts and ends in the death cell, but flashback presentation fails to aid a loose and extravagant script. Much is left unexplained and neither the acting nor the direction is good enqugh to fire an audience's imagination."
