= Tread Softly (1952 film) =

- Directed by: David MacDonald
- Written by: Gerald Verner; Donald Ginsberg; Vivian Cox
- Based on: BBC radio serial & novel The Show Must Go On by Gerald Verner
- Produced by: Vivian Cox; Donald Ginsberg
- Starring: Frances Day; Patricia Dainton; John Bentley
- Cinematography: Reginald H. Wyer
- Edited by: Jean Barker
- Music by: Ivor Slaney
- Production company: Albany Films
- Distributed by: Apex Film Distributors (UK)
- Release date: December 1952 (UK)
- Running time: 70 minutes
- Country: United Kingdom
- Language: English

Tread Softly is a 1952 British second feature ('B') crime film with musical overtones, directed by David MacDonald and starring Frances Day, Patricia Dainton and John Bentley. It was written by Gerald Verner based on his novel The Show Must Go On. A chorus girl investigates a series of mysterious happenings at a derelict theatre.

== Plot ==
Set in a theatre the film combines light musical numbers with a murder crime story. It includes several elaborate dance routines.

== Cast ==
- Frances Day as Madeleine Peters
- Patricia Dainton as Tangye Ward
- John Bentley as Keith Gilbert
- John Laurie as Angus McDonald
- Olaf Olsen as Philip Defoe
- Nora Nicholson as Isobel Mayne
- Harry Locke as Nutty Potts
- Betty Baskcomb as Olivia Winter
- Robert Urquhart as Clifford Brett
- Ronald Leigh-Hunt as Inspector Hinton
- Michael Ward as Alexander Mayne
- Nelly Arno
- Hamilton Keene
- Betty Hare
- Colin Croft as dancer
- Kenneth MacMillan as dancer
- Keith Sawbridge as pianist
- Anthony Verner

== Production ==
It was made at Marylebone Studios and at the Granville Theatre in Fulham. While made as a second feature it also had aspirations to top the bill in some cinemas.

== Reception ==
The Monthly Film Bulletin wrote: "Very indifferent musical thriller."

Kine Weekly wrote: "The crime theme is untidy, but the song and dance asides, although equally unprofessional, account for a few bright and engaging moments. ...The picture, a sort of poor man's Murder at the Windmill, has a promising central idea, but uneven acting ... and indifferent direction soon take the edge off it. Attempts to create essential macabre atmosphere are offset by bizarre dance ensembles, featuring some appalling 'cissies', and more damage is done by shoddy camera work. Its poor comparison with its slick American counterpart may not, however, prevent it from registering with the hoi polloi."

The Radio Times Guide to Films gave the film 1/5 stars, writing: "This is an awesomely bad musical comedy thriller, offering only the melancholy spectacle of a once great star on her uppers. American Frances Day, a bubbly singer/comedian in Britain from the 1920s, was fading fast by the time she made this senseless feature about a company of actors trying to stage a revue in a haunted theatre."

In British Sound Films: The Studio Years 1928–1959 David Quinlan rated the film as "mediocre", writing: "Lifeless musical thriller."
