= Sea Devils (1953 film) =

1953 film by Raoul Walsh

- Theatrical release poster
- Directed by: Raoul Walsh
- Screenplay by: Borden Chase
- Story by: Borden Chase
- Based on: Toilers of the Sea by Victor Hugo
- Produced by: David Rose
- Starring: Rock Hudson; Yvonne De Carlo; Maxwell Reed
- Cinematography: Wilkie Cooper
- Edited by: John Seabourne Sr.
- Music by: Richard Addinsell
- Production company: Coronado Productions
- Distributed by: RKO Radio Pictures
- Release dates: April 25, 1953 (United Kingdom); May 23, 1953 (United States)
- Running time: 91 minutes
- Countries: United Kingdom; United States
- Language: English

Sea Devils is a 1953 historical adventure film directed by Raoul Walsh and starring Rock Hudson, Yvonne De Carlo, and Maxwell Reed. The story is based on Victor Hugo's novel Toilers of the Sea, which was the working title of the film. The scenes at sea were shot around the Channel Islands, and much of the rest of the film was shot on location in those islands as well.

== Plot ==
The year is 1800, and Britain and France have been at war since 1798. Gilliatt, a fisherman-turned-smuggler on Guernsey, agrees to transport a beautiful woman, Droucette, to the French coast on his ship the Sea Devil. Droucette tells him that she intends to organise the rescue of her brother from a French prison. Gilliatt finds himself falling in love with her, and so feels betrayed when he later learns that Droucette is a countess helping Napoleon plan an invasion of Great Britain. However, in reality she is a British agent working to thwart the invasion.

Not knowing this, and believing her a French spy, Gilliatt kidnaps Droucette and takes her back to Guernsey. He takes her to Lethiery and accuses her of being a French spy. However, Lethiery had organised the scheme, so instead of imprisoning Droucette, he returns her to France. Gilliat spots Rantain escorting her to his boat at night, and believing she is being taken to be hanged, swims out to Raintain's boat and knocks out his partner, Blasquito. However, Gilliatt is overpowered and tied up below deck. Droucette stops short of telling him the truth, but kisses him and says she loves him just before she disembarks in France. Anchored slightly off the coast, Droucette swims the final 100m and goes back to the bed she was kidnapped from.

Rantain takes Gilliatt back to Guernsey, but both end in prison. Pretending nothing happened in the night, Droucette meets Fouché. Fouché discovers that all the staff at the chateau were replaced just before Droucette arrived, becomes suspicious and invites the elderly Baron to Boudrec to the chateau to confirm her identity.

Napoleon visits the chateau and explains his invasion plan to his generals. Droucette listens in through a communication trumpet, but the Baron arrives and tricks her with a question about his long-dead son. Fouché locks her in the dungeon of the chateau. A carrier pigeon takes news to Lethierry in Guernsey, who releases Gilliatt on condition that he rescues Droucette. However, Gilliatt has to take Rantain as an aide.

A coded message is sent to Droucette but is intercepted. Foche contrives to let her escape but be secretly followed. She heads to the cafe where Gilliatt does his brandy collections. Back on the ship, Rantain overpowers his guard Willie, goes to the cafe and gets the owner to tie up Gilliatt. He is about to kill Gilliatt when Willie enters and kills him instead. Droucette appears, but the cafe is surrounded by French soldiers, who pursue them to the coast. Gilliatt leads the soldiers off while Droucette swims to the boat. After shaking off his pursuers, Gilliatt swims to join her.

== Cast ==
- Rock Hudson as Gilliatt ("Gil")
- Yvonne De Carlo as Droucette
- Maxwell Reed as Rantaine
- Denis O'Dea as Lethierry
- Michael Goodliffe as Ragan
- Bryan Forbes as Willie
- Jacques B. Brunius as Fouche
- Ivor Barnard as Benson
- Arthur Wontner as Baron de Baudrec
- Gérard Oury as Napoleon
- Larry Taylor as Blasquito
- Keith Pyott as General Latour
- Reed De Rouen as Customs man
- Michael Mulcaster as Coastguard skipper
- Rene Poirier as Duprez

== Production ==
The film was originally titled Toilers of the Sea, from the novel by Victor Hugo which formed the basis of Borden Chase's screenplay. The novel was changed substantially and Hugo is not credited; Borden Chase is given a credit for story and screenplay.

The film was made by a British independent company, Coronado Productions, belonging to producer David Rose.

The female lead was originally offered to Joan Fontaine who turned it down. She was replaced by Yvonne De Carlo, whose casting meant she had to postpone a film she was going to make for Edward Small, Savage Frontier. Her co-star was Rock Hudson, on loan from Universal; Hudson and De Carlo had previously made Scarlet Angel together.

Rose arranged for the film to be distributed through RKO. The director was Raoul Walsh who had just made Blackbeard the Pirate (1952) for RKO.

Filming started August 1952 on location on the Channel Islands. There was also shooting in Saint-Malo, France. Walsh fell into the sea during shooting one scene and had to take two days off to recover.

De Carlo was having an affair with Aly Khan during filming.

Bryan Forbes plays Rock Hudson's sidekick. The role was meant to be played by Barry Fitzgerald but Forbes had befriended Walsh during the making of The World in His Arms (1952) which Walsh directed and Forbes appeared in. Walsh insisted Forbes play the role, and that Forbes help rewrite the part for a younger actor. Forbes later wrote: "The finished film now...reminds me both of happy times and, less agreeably, my ludicrous performance in a fairly ludicrous film."

Richard Addinsell wrote the music.

The film was completed and copyrighted in 1952 but released early in 1953.

== Trivia ==
Victor Hugo lived on Guernsey, hence its being the setting of the story. Lethierry's house in the film appears to be Hugo's house (or a copy).

Although not critical to the plot the script includes some geographical inaccuracies: when Gilliat leaves Guernsey with Droucette he tells his partner Willie to steer South by South West instead of South East, with the intention of going to an island instead of France. However Guernsey is so close to France that both these directions hit the French coast.

The script also refers to the "Emperor Napoleon": Napoleon did not become Emperor until 1804.
