= Helga Cranston =

German film editor

- Born: Helga May; 6 May 1921; Darmstadt, Germany
- Died: 1 March 2013 (aged 91); Tel Aviv, Israel
- Occupation: Film editor
- Years active: 1940s–1960s
- Spouse(s): Maurice Cranston; Mel Keller

Helga Cranston (born Helga May, 6 May 1921 – 1 March 2013) was a German film editor who worked in the British and Israeli film industries from the 1940s through the 1960s.

== Biography ==
Helga was born in Germany to Jewish parents; she and her family emigrated to England to escape the Nazis when she was 18. Still in her teens, she married the philosopher Maurice Cranston. She edited films for directors like Laurence Olivier and Otto Preminger, then moved to Israel in the 1950s, where she continued her career as an editor and also worked in academia.

== Selected filmography ==
- Sands of Beersheba (1964)
- The Simhon Family (1964)
- Joseph the Dreamer (1962)
- They Were Ten (1961)
- Model for Murder (1959)
- Bonjour Tristesse (1958)
- Saint Joan (1957)
- Richard III (1955)
- The Diamond Wizard (1954)
- The Final Test (1953)
- Honeymoon Deferred (1951)
- Madness of the Heart (1949)
- It's Hard to Be Good (1948)
- Daybreak (1948)
- Hamlet (1948)
