= Flame of Araby =

1951 film by Charles Lamont

- Film poster by Reynold Brown
- Directed by: Charles Lamont
- Written by: Gerald Drayson Adams
- Produced by: Leonard Goldstein
- Starring: Maureen O'Hara; Jeff Chandler
- Cinematography: Russell Metty
- Edited by: Ted Kent
- Production company: Universal Pictures
- Distributed by: Universal Pictures
- Release date: December 19, 1951 (New York)
- Running time: 77 minutes
- Country: United States
- Language: English
- Box office: $1.5 million (US rentals)

Flame of Araby (also known as Flame of the Desert) is a 1951 American Technicolor adventure film directed by Charles Lamont starring Maureen O'Hara, Jeff Chandler and British star Maxwell Reed in his American film debut. Location shooting took place at Vasquez Rocks, Bronson Canyon, and the Alabama Hills in Lone Pine, California.

== Plot ==
Bedouin chief Tamerlaine is engaged in the hunt for the legendary black stallion Shahzada. Tunisian Princess Tanya desires to capture the horse to race in competition against hated brothers Borka and Hakim so that she will not be forced to marry one of them. After a prolonged and deadly rivalry, Tamerlaine joins forces with Tanya to trap the stallion, and they fall in love.

== Cast ==
- Maureen O'Hara as Princess Tanya
- Jeff Chandler as Tamerlane
- Maxwell Reed as Prince Medina
- Lon Chaney Jr. as Borka Barbarossa
- Buddy Baer as Hakim Barbarossa
- Richard Egan as Captain Fezil
- Dewey Martin as Yak
- Royal Dano as Basra
- Susan Cabot as Clio
- Judith Braun as Calu
- Henry Brandon as Mallik

== Production ==
The film was originally known as Flame of the Desert. Maureen O'Hara reportedly requested Chandler as her leading man.

== Reception ==
In a contemporary review for The New York Times, critic Howard Thompson called the film "multi-colored corn hash" and wrote: "'Flame of'Araby' ... is full of horses, sand, rocks, pulchritude, flowing veils and burnooses. It has about everything, in fact, except the kitchen sink, which is where it belongs."

== See also ==
- Raiders of the Seven Seas (1953), with the pirate Barbarossa as a hero
