= Steven Pallos =

British film producer

Steven Pallos (born 1902 in Budapest) was an Austro-Hungarian-born British film producer. Partnered from 1954–1957 with producer Charles Leeds, the pair operated the British film production company Gibraltar Films (not to be confused with Rock Hudson's American film production company Gibraltar Productions).

== Partial filmography ==
- Call of the Blood (1949)
- Hotel Sahara (1951)
- The Fake (1953)
- The Diamond (1954)
- The Master Plan (1955)
- Before I Wake (1955)
- The Man in the Road (1956)
- Guilty? (1956)
- No Road Back (1957)
- Sail Into Danger (1957)
- The Surgeon's Knife (1957)
- Face in the Night (1957)
- Jet Storm (1959)
- Foxhole in Cairo (1960)
- The Hands of Orlac (1960)
- Where the Spies Are (1965)
- Naked Evil (1966)
- Captain Nemo and the Underwater City (1969)
- The Three Musketeers (1974)
