= Grand Prix (1934 film) =

- Directed by: St. John Legh Clowes
- Written by: St. John Legh Clowes
- Produced by: St. John Legh Clowes; L.S. Stock
- Starring: John Stuart; Jillian Sand; Milton Rosmer
- Color process: Black & White
- Production companies: Clowes & Stock
- Distributed by: Columbia Pictures Corporation
- Release date: March 1934 (UK)
- Running time: 71 minutes
- Country: United Kingdom
- Language: English

Grand Prix is a 1934 British sports drama film directed and written by St. John Legh Clowes and starring John Stuart, Gillian Sande, Milton Rosmer and Peter Gawthorne.

== Preservation status ==
The British Film Institute National Archive holds a collection of stills but no film or video materials.

== Plot ==
Car mechanics John Halford and John Macintyre run a motor manufacturing company. Halford's son Jack and Macintyre's daughter Jean are in love, but are separated when Jean is sent away to finishing school. She returns with airs and graces and favours a new Society boyfriend over Jack. When Jack accidentally kills Macintyre, things deteriorate further between him and Jean, who inherits her father's partnership and sacks Jack from the company. After going abroad to make his name as a racing driver, Jack returns and enters a motor race against Jean. He proves his love for her by deliberately crashing his car, allowing her to win the race.

== Cast ==
- John Stuart as Jack Halford
- Gillian Sande as Jean McIntyre
- Peter Gawthorne as John McIntyre

== Reception ==
Kine Weekly wrote: "This British motor-racing drama has quite a sound theme, much of the detail is authentic, and the track thrills, borrowed from topicals, carry punch. One fundamental thing, however, is lacking, and that is experienced, imaginative direction. The presentation of the story is so amateurish that its virtues are lost and good entertainment passes it by."

The Daily Film Renter wrote: "Motor racing drama. Mechanically constructed, but supplying fair interest in peeps behind scenes of big car factory and actual shots of races at Brooklands and continental courses. Effective acting by principals and production values adequate. Second feature for average popular audiences. ... Direction is straightforward, but has produced a film that moves in a somewhat leisurely fashion."
