= The Dark Man (film) =

1951 British film by Jeffrey Dell

- Directed by: Jeffrey Dell
- Written by: Jeffrey Dell
- Produced by: Julian Wintle
- Starring: Edward Underdown; Maxwell Reed; Natasha Parry; William Hartnell; Barbara Murray
- Cinematography: Eric Cross
- Edited by: Geoffrey Muller
- Music by: Hubert Clifford
- Production company: Independent Artists
- Distributed by: General Film Distributors
- Release date: 22 January 1951
- Running time: 91 minutes
- Country: United Kingdom
- Language: English
- Budget: £58,200
- Box office: £90,000

The Dark Man (also known as Man Detained) is a 1951 British black and white film-noir thriller film written and directed by Jeffrey Dell and starring Edward Underdown, Maxwell Reed and Natasha Parry. It was produced by Julian WIntle for Rank Studios.

== Plot ==
At a farmhouse in a lonely wood, "The Dark Man" kills a petty criminal. He then shoots the taxi driver who drove him there, knowing he would be able to identify him. However, The Dark Man is spotted at the scene of the second murder by a young actress, Molly, who is passing by on her bicycle, although she doesn't realise what has happened at the time. This is reported in the newspaper, and, although she only saw him from a distance, The Dark Man will take no chances, and decides to kill Molly. When the police investigate the killings, Inspector Viner is assigned to the case and soon develops romantic feelings for Molly. Meanwhile, The Dark Man stalks his prey, and after being foiled in an attempt to kill Molly at her home continues to pursue her. The climax comes with a desperate chase across a desolate landscape.

== Cast ==
- Edward Underdown as Detective Inspector Jack Viner
- Maxwell Reed as The Dark Man
- Natasha Parry as Molly Lester
- William Hartnell as Superintendent of Police
- Barbara Murray as Carol Burns
- Cyril Smith as Samuel Denny
- Leonard White as Detective Evans
- Johnny Singer as the Adjutant
- Geoffrey Sumner as Major
- Sam Kydd as Sergeant Major
- Geoffrey Bond as Walsham Police Sergeant
- Gerald Andersen as Walsham Police Inspector
- Betty Cooper as Carol's mother
- Robert Long as Charles Burns
- Grace Denbeigh-Russell as hotel proprietress
- Norman Claridge as doctor
- John Hewer as taxi driver

== Critical reception ==
The Monthly Film Bulletin wrote: "This attempt at a low-budget thriller, shot mainly on location, is undermined by the staggering improbabilities of the script. Molly's reactions to the threats of the Dark Man and her hesitancy in seeking help from the police, are unbelievably stupid: with equal stupidity she allows herself to be kidnapped by an old and obvious trick. The contrivances of the script are not helped, either, by stilted dialogue. The Dark Man has some excellent exterior camerawork, and both Natasha Parry and Edward Underdown show, in unrewarding parts, talent and personality."

The New York Times wrote: "this Julian Wintle production often stirs up a fair amount of suspense and absorption, chiefly because of the efficient direction of Jeffrey Dell, an excellent performance by Edward Underdown, as a detective, and a painless round-up of typical British "types" in minor roles. But the scenario is a meandering affair overbalanced with too many sneering close-ups of its culprits, and ... anything but suggestive of the banner of the distributors, Fine Arts Films, Inc."

Picturegoer wrote: "Competently made and acted murder story. There is no mystery about who is responsible for the killing, but there is plenty of suspense. Excellent camera work adds to the good overall tightness. ... Edward Underdown is excellent as the detective, and Natasha Parry copes well with the role of the heroine. Maxwell Reed has little to do but look sinister. But he shows up well as the villain. William Hartnell turns in a very neat characterization of a police superintendent."

Picture Show wrote: "Well acted but somewhat slow moving crime drama, with Maxwell Reed as the silent murderer who is hunted from the beginning to the end, but never seems to think of changing his dark suit and hat. Its seaside setting is really refreshing, and beautifully photographed, while the climax on a windy coastal artillery range where the Dark Man seeks refuge, is really thrilling. Maxwell Reed, Edward Underdown, William Hartnell and Natasha Parry head the excellent cast."

AllMovie noted: "the plot is nothing new, though the settings – a provincial repertory theatre, a military rifle range – are rather novel."

Britmovie said, "Edward Underdown is clearly too old to be the young policeman and love interest, but brooding Maxwell Reed is very effective as the shadowy ‘Dark Man’."

In British Sound Films: The Studio Years 1928–1959 David Quinlan rated the film as "good", writing: "Good camerawork and direction of chase scenes paper over some of the weaknesses in the script."
