= Once Upon a Dream (1949 film) =

- Directed by: Ralph Thomas
- Screenplay by: Patrick Kirwan; Victor Katona
- Story by: Val Guest
- Produced by: Antony Darnborough; Sydney Box
- Starring: Googie Withers; Griffith Jones; Guy Middleton
- Cinematography: Jack E. Cox
- Edited by: Jean Barker
- Music by: Arthur Wilkinson
- Production company: Sydney Box Productions
- Distributed by: General Film Distributors (UK)
- Release date: February 1949 (UK)
- Running time: 87 minutes
- Country: United Kingdom
- Language: English

Once Upon a Dream is a 1949 British comedy romance film directed by Ralph Thomas in his debut and starring Googie Withers, Griffith Jones, and Guy Middleton. It was a J. Arthur Rank presentation and a Sydney Box production, and was released through General Film Distributors Ltd. The film was made at the Lime Grove Studios with sets designed by the art director Cedric Dawe.

== Plot ==
Just after World War II, former army officer Major Gilbert returns home, shortly after his service batman, Jackson, whom he has taken on as his butler. The major's wife, Carol, is offended that her husband pays her little attention before going off to bed, saying he is exhausted after his journey. That night, she has a romantic dream about Jackson and as a result of a coincidence of events as she wakes up, she believes it actually happened and becomes indignant when Jackson does not act accordingly. Meanwhile, Carol's shop is in financial difficulties, and she needs help from the major's rich aunt with whom she cannot get along.

== Cast ==
- Googie Withers as Carol Gilbert
- Griffith Jones as Jackson
- Guy Middleton as Major Gilbert
- Betty Lynne as Mlle Louise
- David Horne as Registrar
- Geoffrey Morris as Registrar's Clerk
- Raymond Lovell as Mr. Trout
- Noel Howlett as Solicitor
- Agnes Lauchlan as Aunt Agnes
- Mirren Wood as Conductress
- Hubert Gregg as Captain Williams
- Maurice Denham as Vicar
- Mona Washbourne as Vicar's Wife
- Nora Nicholson as 1st W.V.S.
- Dora Bryan as Barmaid
- Hal Osmond as Bailiff
- Arthur Denton as Janitor
- Eric Messiter as Pontefact
- Gibb McLaughlin as Pontefact
- Cecil Bevan as Wright
- Wilfred Caithness as Pontefact

== Production ==
Margaret Lockwood refused to do the film and was put on suspension by Rank. She said when she read the script - then called Roses for Her Pillow - "as I reached the last page I hurled the manuscript across the room. I had never been so angry." She complained to her agent "how dare they offer me a part like that... It's no more than that of a stooge." Her agent tried to see if they could improve it but Lockwood said "I would not listen. This time no one was going to make me change my mind. I did not care what anyone said. I was sick of getting mediocre parts and poor scripts."

The film was cancelled in October 1947 while head of studio Sydney Box tried to figure out how to reconfigure the movie.

Ralph Thomas was head of the trailer department for the Rank Film Organisation. He had made a number of trailers for producer Sydney Box, including one for the film Miranda (1948) which Box liked. "He was particularly taken with it," said Thomas. When the original director for Once Upon a Dream fell ill, Box offered Thomas the chance to direct. It was on this film that Thomas met Box's sister Betty, who would go on to make over 20 films with Thomas.

== Reception ==
By 1953 the film earned a net revenue of £79,000.

Allmovie noted, "More silly than funny, Once Upon a Dream is kept alive by the enthusiastic performances of its leading players."
