= The Last Page =

1952 British film by Terence Fisher

- Theatrical release poster
- Directed by: Terence Fisher
- Written by: Frederick Knott
- Based on: the play "The Last Page" by James Hadley Chase
- Produced by: Anthony Hinds
- Starring: George Brent; Marguerite Chapman; Diana Dors
- Cinematography: Walter J. Harvey
- Edited by: Maurice Rootes
- Music by: Frank Spencer
- Production company: Hammer Film Productions (as "Exclusive")
- Distributed by: Lippert Pictures (USA); Exclusive Films (UK)
- Release dates: February 1952 (U.S.); 19 May 1952 (UK)
- Running time: 84 minutes (UK); 78 minutes (US)
- Country: United Kingdom
- Language: English

The Last Page, released in the United States as Man Bait, is a 1952 British film noir directed by Terence Fisher, starring George Brent, Marguerite Chapman and Diana Dors. The film is notable for being the first Hammer film directed by Fisher, who later played a critical role in the company's immensely successful horror film cycle. Jimmy Sangster was assistant director, Michael Carreras was casting director and Phil Leakey handled Makeup. The film was released first in the US in February 1952, retitled Man Bait and shortened by 6 minutes. It was later trade shown in the UK as The Last Page on April 23, 1952, and released on May 19, 1952.

== Plot ==
Ruby Bruce, an attractive young bookshop clerk, catches ex-con Jeff Hart trying to steal a rare book. Instead of turning him in, she accepts a date with him. Working late next day, Ruby initiates a kiss with the shop manager Harman, who responds for a moment, then stops, horrified at his behaviour. She tells Hart, who persuades Ruby to blackmail Harman, hitting her to bruise her arm, saying she can pretend that Harman did it.

When Harman refuses to pay, Hart tells Ruby to write a letter to Harman's invalid wife, who dies from a heart attack when she gets out of bed to burn the letter. Harman tells Ruby that he knows the letter was from her, and that she is responsible for his wife's death. A distraught Ruby tells Hart what has happened, and that she feels guilty about Mrs Harman's death, but Hart threatens her to demand the money from Harman anyway.

Frightened and desperate, Ruby asks Harman again for money, and he angrily gives her the £300 he and his wife had been on the point of using for treatment for her abroad. Having broken into the shop basement, Hart catches Ruby hiding part of the money and accidentally kills her as they hide from Harman, and he hides her body in a packing case. Harman discovers Ruby's body and, thinking he will be accused, flees in panic. With the help of his secretary Stella he hunts for clues to the killer. Stella tracks down Hart, but he starts a fire to kill her, just as the police and Harman arrive after a tip-off. Harman saves Stella and the police arrest Hart.

== Cast ==
- George Brent as John Harman
- Marguerite Chapman as Stella Tracy
- Diana Dors as Ruby Bruce
- Peter Reynolds as Jeffrey (Jeff) Hart
- Meredith Edwards as Inspector Dale
- Harry Fowler as Joe, clerk
- Raymond Huntley as Clive Oliver
- Eleanor Summerfield as Vi
- Isabel Dean as May Harman
- Nelly Arno as Miss Rossetti

== Production ==
The Last Page was the first of 17 films made under a four-year production and distribution contract between Hammer and the US film distribution company Lippert Pictures. As in all of these films, the lead role was played by a well-known Hollywood actor supplied by Lippert to ensure familiarity with American audiences. Lippert was on the set visiting Hammer the day production on this film began on July 7, 1951. Lippert provided George Brent to Hammer, and James Carreras later reciprocated by persuading Diana Dors to star in several American movies for Lippert.

== Critical reception ==
Variety said: "First half of the footage is marked by a leisurely British tempo as director Terence Fisher rather methodically establishes the characters. However, latter half is better paced as plot becomes more melodramatic and general feeling gotten across is on the plus side. London locale also is on the favorable side."

In British Sound Films: The Studio Years 1928–1959 David Quinlan wrote: ''Efficient crime yarn could have been even better without fading Hollywood stars.''

Chibnall and McFarlane in The British 'B' Film call the film "an efficient melodrama of blackmail and murder."

Leslie Halliwell called the film a "curious English mystery with American stars."

Filmink said "the best thing about it is Dors’ performance: lonely, put-about, hungry for love, insecure. The movie is never as good once her character disappears, but is still definitely worth seeking out if you like your low-budget British noirs."
