= Helen of Troy (film) =

1956 film by Robert Wise

- Original film poster
- Directed by: Robert Wise
- Written by: Hugh Gray; N. Richard Nash; John Twist
- Based on: Iliad; 8th century B.C. poem by Homer
- Starring: Rossana Podestà; Jacques Sernas; Sir Cedric Hardwicke; Stanley Baker; Niall MacGinnis
- Narrated by: Jack Sernas
- Cinematography: Harry Stradling
- Edited by: Thomas Reilly
- Music by: Max Steiner
- Distributed by: Warner Bros. Pictures
- Release date: 26 January 1956 (United States)
- Running time: 118 minutes (US version)
- Countries: United States; Italy; France
- Language: English
- Budget: $6 million
- Box office: $3.2 million (US rentals)

Helen of Troy is a 1956 American-Italian-French epic historical drama film, based on Homer's Iliad and Odyssey. It was directed by Robert Wise, from a screenplay by Hugh Gray and John Twist, adapted by Hugh Gray and N. Richard Nash. The music score was composed by Max Steiner and the cinematography by Harry Stradling Sr, who shot the film in CinemaScope. The movie has been called "a forgotten Robert Wise epic".

The film stars Rossana Podestà, Stanley Baker, Sir Cedric Hardwicke and Jacques Sernas, with Niall MacGinnis, Maxwell Reed, Nora Swinburne, Robert Douglas, Torin Thatcher, Harry Andrews, Janette Scott, Ronald Lewis, Eduardo Ciannelli, Esmond Knight and Brigitte Bardot as Andraste, Helen's handmaiden, her first film production shot outside France.

== Plot ==
The film retells the story of the Trojan War in 1100 B.C., albeit with some major changes from the Iliad's storyline; Paris of Troy sails to Sparta to secure a peace treaty between the two powerful city-states. His ship is forced to return to Troy in a storm after he has been swept overboard on the shore of Sparta. Paris is found by Helen, queen of Sparta with whom he falls in love. He goes to the palace where he finds Helen's husband, King Menelaus, Agamemnon, Odysseus, Achilles and many other Greek kings debating whether to go to war with Troy. Menelaus, who is denied by Helen, sees that his wife and Paris are in love and, pretending friendship, plots Paris' death.

Warned by Helen, Paris flees and, after they are both nearly caught by the Spartans, takes Helen with him to Troy. Under the pretense of helping Menelaus regain his honor, the Greeks unite, and the siege of Troy begins. Much blood is shed in the long ordeal, with the Trojans blaming their plight on Paris and Helen until it turns out that the Greeks are solely after Troy's riches, not Helen. The siege culminates in Greek victory through the ruse of the legendary Trojan Horse. While trying to flee, Helen and Paris are cornered by Menelaus. Paris faces the Spartan king in single combat, but just as he wins the upper hand he is stabbed from behind, denying him a fair trial by arms. Helen is forced to return with Menelaus, but she is serene in the knowledge that in death she will be reunited with Paris in Elysium.

== Cast ==
- Rossana Podestà as Helen of Troy
- Jacques Sernas as Paris
- Sir Cedric Hardwicke as Priam
- Stanley Baker as Achilles
- Niall MacGinnis as Menelaus
- Robert Douglas as Agamemnon
- Nora Swinburne as Hecuba
- Torin Thatcher as Ulysses
- Harry Andrews as Hector
- Ronald Lewis as Aeneas
- Brigitte Bardot as Andraste
- Marc Lawrence as Diomedes, ruler of Aetolia
- Maxwell Reed as Ajax, Prince of Salamis
- Robert Brown as Polydorus
- Barbara Cavan as Cora
- Patricia Marmont as Andromache
- Guido Notari as Nestor
- Tonio Selwart as Alephous
- George Zoritch as Singer
- Esmond Knight as High Priest
- Terence Longdon as Patroclus
- Janette Scott as Cassandra
- Eduardo Ciannelli as Andros

== Production ==
The film was originally planned to be made in 3-D but Warner Bros. Pictures later announced that it was to be made in WarnerSuperScope instead using Warner's new All-Media camera with no mention of 3-D. It was eventually released in CinemaScope.

The movie was one of several Hollywood films shot in Europe in the 1950s that used Stanley Baker as a villain.

The film was made in Rome's Cinecittà Studios and in Punta Ala, Grosseto. A filmmakers' professional journal noted that by December 1954 cinematographer Harry Stradling had returned from his work Italy, and that "more than 200 persons were injured and 3 reportedly killed during the shooting."

The scene of the Greeks' initial assault on the walls of Troy features a series of shots that are directly copied from a sequence in the Persian attack on Babylon in D. W. Griffiths' silent film classic Intolerance. Some shots from this sequence would in turn be reused in the introductionary scenes of the 1963 film Jason and the Argonauts.

This project makes several departures from the original story, including showing Paris as a hero and great leader, and most of the Greek lords as treacherous and opportunistic pirates who are using Helen's flight as an excuse to win the treasures of Troy. The 2003 miniseries sharing its name with this film would later partially re-employ this plot device.

== Reception ==
Bosley Crowther of The New York Times wrote that some parts were "well done", including the Greek descent from the Trojan horse which "has the air of great adventure that one expects from this tale", but "the human drama in the legend ... is completely lost or never realized in the utter banalities of the script, in the clumsiness of the English dialogue and in the inexcusable acting cliches."

Hy Hollinger of Variety wrote: "The word 'spectacular' achieves its true meaning when applied to Warner Bros.' 'Helen of Troy.' The retelling of the Homeric legend, filmed in its entirety in Italy, makes lavish use of the Cinemascope screen ... Action sequences alone should stir word-of-mouth."

Edwin Schallert of the Los Angeles Times wrote, "'Helen of Troy' qualifies as a mighty film impression of history and legend ... The Warner film satisfies the demands for beauty, and also attains triumphant effects, which give real life to ancient battles with spear, bow and arrow, fire, sword and javelin. In their magnitude attacks on the walled city of Troy are awe-inspiring."

Richard L. Coe of The Washington Post reported, "The popcorn set and I had a glorious time at this epic ... I don't suppose the genteel set will go much for this one, but, boy, those crowd scenes, warriors falling to destruction, flames flaming, javelins nipping into a chest here and there." Harrison's Reports declared, "The massiveness and opulence of the settings, the size of the huge cast, and the magnitude of the battle between the Greeks and the Trojans are indeed eye-filling ... Unfortunately, the breathtaking quality of the production values is not matched by the stilted story, which takes considerable dramatic license with the Homer version of the events leading up to the Trojan war, and which are at best only moderately interesting." The Monthly Film Bulletin found the film "uninterestingly dialogued and characterised ... The battle scenes, however, are vigorously and sometimes excitingly staged." John McCarten of The New Yorker wrote that the film "hasn't enough life to hold your interest consistently. That's too bad, for toward the end there are those battle scenes and a fine impersonation of that wooden horse."

== Comic book adaptation ==
- Dell Four Color #684 (March 1956).

== See also ==
- List of American films of 1956
- List of historical drama films
- Greek mythology in popular culture
- Troy (film)
