= Subway in the Sky =

- British quad poster
- Directed by: Muriel Box
- Written by: Jack Andrews
- Based on: stage play by Ian Main
- Produced by: Sydney Box; Patrick Filmer-Sankey; John Temple-Smith
- Starring: Van Johnson; Hildegard Knef
- Cinematography: Wilkie Cooper
- Edited by: Jean Barker
- Music by: Mario Nascimbene
- Production company: Orbit Films
- Distributed by: British Lion Films
- Release date: 22 February 1959
- Running time: 87 minutes
- Country: United Kingdom
- Language: English

Subway in the Sky is a 1959 British crime film directed by Muriel Box and starring Van Johnson, Hildegard Knef and Albert Lieven. It was written by Jack Andrews based on the 1957 play of the same title by Ian Main. Knef, who changed career in the 1960s to become a cabaret singer and songwriter, sings one song in the film, "It Isn't Love" (Jeff Davis/Geoffrey Parsons).

== Plot ==
Baxter Grant, an American soldier in West Berlin, deserts and goes on the run when faced with false drug trafficking and murder charges. He takes shelter with cabaret singer Lilli Hoffman, whom he manages to persuade to help prove his innocence.

== Cast ==
- Van Johnson as Major Baxter Grant
- Hildegard Knef as Lilli Hoffman
- Albert Lieven as Carl
- Cec Linder as Carson
- Katherine Kath as Anna Grant
- Vivian Matalon as Stefan Grant
- Carl Jaffe as German Detective
- Michael Bell as GI
- James Maxwell as officer
- Tom Watson as corporal
- Edward Judd as Molloy
- Brian Wilde as military policeman

== Production ==
The film was shot at Shepperton Studios near London. The film's sets were designed by the art director George Provis.

== Critical reception ==
The Monthly Film Bulletin wrote: "Although the cast, especially Cec Linder, perform with admirable seriousness, it remains extremely difficult to accept the highly unlikely characters and events of this smooth slice of romantic melodrama, served rather better by its sets and photography than the subject merits."

Leslie Halliwell said: "Tedious photographed play with precious few points of dramatic interest."

Leonard Maltin gave the film one and a half out of four stars, calling it a "flabby caper," regarding it a "terrible waste of (Hildegard) Neff's talents".

Tony Sloman gave it three out of five stars in the Radio Times, calling it, "a film that wasn't highly regarded on its release, but thanks to its cast, subject matter and director bears re-evaluation today. (It) features two particularly watchable stars, both of whom have done better work than this. Ageing bobby-sox idol Van Johnson is a better actor than is generally acknowledged; he had a propensity for worried, introverted heroes... The director is Muriel Box, one of the few English women directors to have had a successful screen career, though here she struggles to keep the stage origins of the material hidden. Wilkie Cooper's stark black-and-white photography is excellent."

In British Sound Films: The Studio Years 1928–1959 David Quinlan rated the film as "average", writing: "successful play makes mild, stagey movie."
