= The Brain Machine (film) =

1956 British thriller by Ken Hughes

- Theatrical release poster
- Directed by: Ken Hughes
- Written by: Ken Hughes
- Produced by: Alec C. Snowden
- Starring: Maxwell Reed; Elizabeth Allan; Patrick Barr; Russell Napier
- Cinematography: Josef Ambor
- Edited by: Geoffrey Muller
- Music by: Richard Taylor
- Production company: Merton Park Studios
- Distributed by: Anglo-Amalgamated
- Release date: February 1956 (US)
- Running time: 84 minutes
- Country: United Kingdom
- Language: English

The Brain Machine is a 1956 British thriller film directed and written by Ken Hughes and starring Maxwell Reed, Elizabeth Allan and Patrick Barr.

== Plot ==
A husband and wife team of doctors attempt to stop a dangerously unbalanced man from committing a series of crimes.

== Cast ==
- Maxwell Reed as Frank Smith
- Elizabeth Allan as Doctor Phillipa Roberts
- Patrick Barr as Doctor Geoffrey Allen
- Russell Napier as Inspector Durham
- Gibb McLaughlin as Spencer Simon
- Neil Hallett as Detective Superintendent John Harris
- Mark Bellamy as Louie, the gangster
- Bill Nagy as Charlie, gym owner
- Edwin Richfield as Henry Arthur Ryan
- Clifford Buckton as Edward Jarritt
- John Horsley as Doctor Richards
- Gwen Bacon as nurse-matron
- Donald Bisset as Major Gifford
- Thomas Gallagher as Bates, plant foreman
- Vanda Godsell as Mabel Smith
- Cyril Smith as prison warder
- Anthony Valentine as Tony
- Joan Tyrrell as woman in hallway
- Henry Webb as apartment janitor
- Dan Wilson as personnel manager
- Hilda Barry as Mrs. Wright
- Marianne Stone as hospital echnician

== Production ==
The film was made at Merton Park Studios in South London by Anglo-Amalgamated. It was released as a co-feature, as part of a double bill. Berkshire Pictures Corp. later sued RKO claiming the latter did a poor job distributing.

== Critical reception ==
The Monthly Film Bulletin wrote: "The opening scenes lead one to anticipate a science fiction story, but the film soon develops into a conventional crime thriller. Within its terms of reference, though, it is a good one, lacking in neither pace nor incident. Although the plot is largely formula, Ken Hughes' script is lively and his direction often shows imagination, particularly in the use of sound. Of the cast, Maxwell Reed is competent as Smith and Elizabeth Allan convincing as the psychiatrist; the acting otherwise is variable."

The Radio Times Guide to Films gave the film 2/5 stars, writing: "This British B-movie begins, promisingly, in sci-fi mode but soon lapses into routine thrillerdom. ...Despite its cheap production values and leaden acting, the picture has a trashy energy that can be enjoyed if you disengage your own brain."

Filmink called it " a decent little thriller that feels like it wants to be sci-fi but isn't."
