= Before I Wake (1955 film) =

1955 British film by Albert S. Rogell

- US theatrical release poster
- Directed by: Albert S. Rogell
- Written by: Robert Westerby
- Based on: novel Before I Wake by Hal Debrett
- Produced by: Charles Leeds; Steven Pallos
- Starring: Mona Freeman; Jean Kent; Maxwell Reed; Hugh Miller
- Cinematography: Jack Asher
- Edited by: Jim Connock
- Music by: Leonard Salzedo
- Production companies: Gibraltar Films; Roxbury Productions
- Distributed by: Grand National Films (UK); United Artists (US)
- Release date: 10 February 1955
- Running time: 76 minutes
- Country: United Kingdom
- Language: English

Before I Wake (U.S. title: Shadow of Fear; also known as Decoy be Damned) is a 1955 British mystery film directed by Albert S. Rogell and starring Mona Freeman, Jean Kent and Maxwell Reed. It was written by Robert Wasterby based on the 1949 novel Before I Wake by Hal Debrett.

== Plot ==
Returning home to England from the United States following news of her father's sudden death in a boating accident, April Haddon meets her stepmother Florence for the first time. The former nurse of her mother, she had married April's father after her death. April finds that in the few years she has been away her stepmother has completely changed the house, the old furnishings replaced with modernist art and the old family housekeepers replaced by a maid with loyalty to her new mistress. When her father's will is read, it becomes clear that the redrawn will Florence had been expecting had never been completed and the old will still stands, leaving most of his inheritance to April when she turns twenty one, which is in three weeks time. Convinced that Florence intends to murder her first, April turns to an old friend the local doctor to help her, but finds that the whole village is in awe of Florence, who has been very careful always to behave impeccably, publicly, in front of all, including the local gossips.

== Cast ==
- Mona Freeman as April Haddon
- Jean Kent as Florence Haddon
- Maxwell Reed as Michael Elder
- Hugh Miller as Mr. Driscoll
- Gretchen Franklin as Elsie
- Frederick Leister as Dr. Elder
- Alexander Gauge as police sergeant
- Josephine Middleton as Mrs. Harrison
- Frank Forsyth as Jack Storey
- Stanley Van Beers as Harry
- Frank Atkinson as taxi driver
- Philip Ray as station master
- Robert Sansom as parson
- Phyllis Cornell as Dr. Elder's receptionist

== Production ==
It was shot at Walton Studios in Surrey, with sets designed by the art director Scott MacGregor. This was director Rogell's final film.

== Critical reception ==
The Monthly Film Bulletin wrote: "Wholehearted melodrama, complete with wicked stepmother, glass of poisoned milk, sinister side-glance and hypodermic syringe. As the malevolent Florence, Jean Kent gives a somewhat over-obvious performance, relying for effect on a limited range of meaningful grimaces. The editing is untidy and the pace generally slow, and although there are some moments of suspense they are scarcely enough to carry the film."

TV Guide gave the film 2/4 stars for a "Decent suspense mystery," concluding that "The strong point of the film is the credibility Kent gives the story."
