= Femina (UK) =

Feminist publishing company

Femina was the first feminist British publishing company, co-founded in 1965 by screenwriter Muriel Box.

The original board included Vera Brittain, the British writer, feminist and pacifist. The first book published by Femina was The Trial of Marie Stopes written/edited by Muriel Box.
