= Maurice Cranston =

British philosopher

- Maurice Cranston whilst chair of political science at London School of Economics
- Born: Maurice William Cranston; 8 May 1920; Harringay, Middlesex, England, UK
- Died: 5 November 1993 (aged 73); Camden, London, England, UK
- Occupations: Philosopher, professor, and author
- Known for: Biography of Jean-Jacques Rousseau

Maurice William Cranston (8 May 1920 – 5 November 1993) was a British philosopher, professor and author. He served for many years as Professor of Political Science at the London School of Economics, and was also known for his popular publications. In the late 1970s and early 1980s he was Professor of Political Theory at the European University Institute in Florence (Italy).

He was born at 53 Harringay Road, Harringay and educated at South Harringay School, the University of London and St Catherine's College, Oxford. As a young man, Cranston was a friend of the painter Denton Welch, and was immortalised as "Markham" in Welch's short story, "Touchett's Party". During the Second World War, Cranston was a conscientious objector, active in the Peace Pledge Union, and a "frequent contributor" to its newspaper Peace News.

Cranston's major works include biographies of John Locke, for which he received the 1957 James Tait Black Memorial Prize, and Rousseau, Jean-Paul Sartre and others addressing the history of liberty. He contributed to many publications in both Britain and the United States and wrote scripts for the BBC. In 1946 two of his detective novels were published by John Westhouse: Tomorrow We'll Be Sober and Philosopher's Hemlock. Under the name Michael Stone, he also wrote a children's school story The Master of Magic, published by Peter Lunn in 1947.

Cranston's intellectual interests were varied. His first academic book, Freedom: A New Analysis (1954), covered history (the history of liberalism), politics (a precursive discussion of what Sir Isaiah Berlin would later analyse as negative and positive liberty) and a philosophical attempt to resolve or at least elucidate freedom of the will. The philosophical section was the least successful; and Cranston never again attempted pure philosophy. His main academic strengths were as a biographer and as an intellectual historian. In a controversial paper, Cranston argued that the scarcity of welfare goods and services meant that supposed welfare rights are not really rights at all.

In his later years, Cranston moved to the political right, and expressed admiration for Margaret Thatcher. Cranston also contributed to The American Spectator magazine.

Cranston had a keen aesthetic sensibility. This was shown not only in his clothes but also in his elegant literary style. Elegance extended also to his conversation. At a party for politics students at the London School of Economics in 1965, sherry was much in demand. Professor Kingsley Smellie pointed to a bottle and said to Cranston: "I hope you've ordered buckets of that stuff". "I have", Cranston replied without malice, "not quite in those terms".

Maurice Cranston was married twice; his first wife was the film editor Helga May his second wife was Baroness Maximiliana von und zu Fraunberg ("Iliana"), with whom he had two children. He died on 5 November 1993 of a heart attack while taping a television production in London for the BBC. He was 73. He had completed work on the third and final volume of his acclaimed Rousseau biography, which was published posthumously in 1997.

== Publications ==
=== Fiction ===
- Tomorrow We'll be Sober, London: John Westhouse, 1946 (detective novel).
- Philosopher's Hemlock, London: John Westhouse, 1946 (detective novel).
- The Master of Magic, London: Peter Lunn, 1947 (children's book, under the name Michael Stone).

=== Non-Fiction ===
- Freedom: A New Analysis. London: Longmans, Green. 1953 – via Internet Archive.
- John Locke : A Biography, London: Longmans, Green, 1957.
- John Stuart Mill, London: Longmans, Green, 1958.
- Human Rights Today, London: Ampersand, 1962.
- Jean-Jacques Rousseau: The Social Contract, tr. with intro., Harmondsworth : Penguin, 1968.
- The New Left, London: Bodley Head, 1970.
- Politics and Ethics, Inaugural Lecture, London School of Economics, 1971, London: Weidenfeld and Nicolson, 1972.
- The Mask of Politics, and Other Essays, London: Allen Lane, 1973.
- What Are Human Rights?, London: Bodley Head, 1973.
- Jean-Jacques: The Early Life and Work, London: Allen Lane; New York: Norton, 1982. [Vol. 1 of Rousseau biography]
- Imaga Dialogo Marks/Bakunin [in Esperanto], Laroque Timbaut (France): Sennacieca Asocio Tutmonda, 1982.
- Jean-Jacques Rousseau : A Discourse on Inequality, tr. with intro., Harmondsworth: Penguin, 1984.
- 'Rousseau on Equality', Social Philosophy and Policy, 2(01), 1984.
- Philosophers and Pamphleteers: Political Theorists of the Enlightenment. Oxford University Press, 1986.
- The Noble Savage, London: Allen Lane; Chicago: University of Chicago Press, 1991.[Vol. 2 of Rousseau biography]
- The Romantic Movement, Blackwell Publishing Limited, 1994.
- The Solitary Self, London: Allen Lane; Chicago: University of Chicago Press, 1997.[Vol. 3 of Rousseau biography]

== See also ==
- A Critique of Pure Tolerance
