= Madness of the Heart =

1950 British film by Charles Bennett

- Original British quad poster
- Directed by: Charles Bennett
- Screenplay by: Charles Bennett
- Based on: Madness of the Heart by Flora Sandström
- Produced by: Richard Wainwright executive J. Arthur Rank
- Starring: Margaret Lockwood; Maxwell Reed; Kathleen Byron; Paul Dupuis
- Cinematography: Desmond Dickinson
- Edited by: Helga Cranston
- Music by: Allan Gray
- Production company: Two Cities Films
- Distributed by: Universal Pictures (USA)
- Release dates: 23 August 1949; October 1950 (USA)
- Running time: 75 min.
- Country: United Kingdom
- Language: English
- Budget: $800,000

Madness of the Heart is a 1949 British drama film directed by Charles Bennett, produced by Richard Wainwright for Two Cities Films and starring Margaret Lockwood, Maxwell Reed, Kathleen Byron and Paul Dupuis. The screenplay was written by Charles Bennett, adapted from the novel of the same name by Flora Sandström.

== Plot summary ==
Lydia Garth meets Paul de Vandiere, a French nobleman, but their romance is plagued by Lydia's complaint of recurring spells of blurred vision. Paul leaves for France, promising to return and marry Lydia, but she loses her sight while he is gone. Given no hope of recovery, she enters a convent and quickly finds that she has no vocation for life in a nunnery. She finally marries Paul, but encounters strong opposition from Verite Faimont, a neighbour who is very fond of Paul. The latter constantly plots against Lydia and is successful in temporarily breaking up the marriage, but can a miracle of restored vision be seen?

== Cast ==
- Margaret Lockwood as Lydia Garth
- Maxwell Reed as Joseph Rondolet
- Kathleen Byron as Verite Faimont
- Paul Dupuis as Paul de Vandiere
- Thora Hird as Rosa
- Raymond Lovell as Comte de Vandiere
- Maurice Denham as Doctor Simon Blake
- David Hutcheson as Max Ffoliott
- Cathleen Nesbitt as Mother Superior
- Peter Illing as Doctor Matthieu
- Jack McNaughton as Attendant
- Pamela Stirling as Felicite
- Marie Burke as Comtesse de Vandiere
- Marie Ault as Nun
- Sam Kydd as Soldier at Airport
- Joy Harrington as Sister Agnes

== Production ==
The film was based on a novel by Flora Sandström published in 1941.

Charles Bennett was meant to make his directorial debut with a story about the alleged murderer Madeleine Smith, Madeleine (1950); however he was replaced on that project by David Lean and given Madness of the Heart instead. Lockwood's casting was announced in August 1948.

Bennett claimed he "didn't even read" the script "until I was on my way back across the Atlantic to direct it, and then I wanted to throw up. But I had to make it. Margaret Lockwood was my star – a very good actress. And I had a fifty-five day shooting schedule. Everything was right about it except the story which was awful."

The film was shot over 12 weeks in early 1949 from January in April. Filming took place at Denham Studios in Buckinghamshire and on location in the south of France in Aix-en-Provence at a castle belonging to the de Sabran family. Location filming was completed without the role of Lockwood's male lead being cast. Eventually French-Canadian actor Paul Dupuis was given the role.

Lockwood reportedly wore 28 different gowns created especially for the film. She also wore a borrowed diamond necklace worth £6,000.

Kathleen Byron was cast on the strength of her performance in Black Narcissus. She later recalled enjoying the filming but said it was hard work:

We did a lot of swimming around in a tank in the studio at Denham. I didn't actually do the riding sequences in the south of France; they had a young boy with a wig on them doing them. Margaret Lockwood wasn't very easy to work with. I know from other people she can be very charming and sweet but I'm afraid our relationship was never very cordial. Desmond Dickson was the cameraman.... and he said to me one say, 'You're only allowed close ups in profile or if your face is distorted in anger – but we're getting around it!' Margaret had a great deal of power then and she certainly influenced which takes or prints could be used.

According to Variety filming took place on schedule and under budget.

== Release ==
The film was not given a West End premiere. This was seen as a bad sign as to the film's quality because it meant critics did not review the movie. It was decided to premiere the film in Blackpool where Lockwood had a strong following.

Nonetheless, the film was received better critically than was originally thought. Trade papers called it a "notable box office attraction" in British cinemas in 1949. Lockwood still managed to be voted the fifth most popular British star at the local box office for 1949.

Lockwood did not make another film for 18 months.

The film was not released in the US until October 1950.

=== Critical reception ===
Variety felt it would be "tough sledding for discriminating audiences... it should satisfy local picturegoers because of Margaret Lockwood, but its appeal to the more sophisticated is likely to be limited. ""

In the Radio Times, David Parkinson called the film an "unpersuasive melodrama", and wrote, "this hackneyed hokum is worth sticking with for the risible showdown...kudos to the supporting cast for keeping straight faces throughout."

Matthew Coniam wrote in the BFI Screenonline, "despite low critical standing (Margaret Lockwood's biographer Hilton Tims calls it "a throwback to the worst excesses of Gainsborough's pulp-fiction days") this is among the star's more interesting post-Gainsborough work...However ripe the plot, writer-director Charles Bennett is subtler in his effects and devices than most critics allow...a remarkable degree of suspense is achieved in the scene in which Veritée attempts to drown Lydia, with its undercurrent of subdued eroticism...Bennett had co-written many of Hitchcock's finest movies, and this film is highly reminiscent of Rebecca (US, 1940) in its settings (an imposing house near a raging coastline), and plot motifs (a commoner's marriage to a wealthy landowner is deliberately strained by a hate-filled third party)."
