= Maxwell Reed =

British actor (1919–1974)

- Autographed publicity still
- Born: 2 April 1919; Larne, County Antrim, Ireland
- Died: 31 October 1974 (aged 55); London, England
- Occupation: Actor
- Years active: 1946–1968
- Spouse: Joan Collins (m. 1952; div. 1956)

Maxwell Reed (2 April 1919 – 31 October 1974) was an Irish actor who became a matinée idol in British films during the 1940s and 1950s.

== Biography ==
=== Early years ===
Reed was born in Larne. He left school aged fifteen to work on ships, including as a blockade runner. He wanted to act and ended up studying at RADA for a year. During World War II he served in the RAF and then the Merchant Navy. After demobilisation he worked as an extra and in repertory. He did a screen test for Riverside Studios at Rank and joined The Company of Youth at the age of 27.

Reed made his film debut in The Years Between (1946) and then appeared in Gaiety George (1946), both in uncredited roles.

=== Leading man ===
Producer Sydney Box thought Reed had star potential and promoted him to leading man status for Daybreak, a film noir which Box produced and co-wrote with his wife Muriel; Reed played an employee of Eric Portman's character Eddie who lusts after Eddie's wife, played by Ann Todd. The film was made in 1946, but not released until 1948 because of censorship issues.

Box then cast Reed opposite Patricia Roc as one of the leads in a film made immediately after but released before Daybreak: The Brothers (1947).

Reed followed it with a rare sympathetic character in Dear Murderer (1947), from a script by Box, which again starred Portman. He then made two films opposite Anne Crawford, Night Beat (1947) and Daughter of Darkness (1948), where he was back to playing his usual scoundrels. He had the lead in a film called Streets Paved with Water but this was abandoned during filming.

Reed had more of a support role in The Lost People (1949), co-directed by Muriel Box, and Madness of the Heart (1949), starring Margaret Lockwood. After his initial late 1940s success he then starred in his first B movie, Blackout (1950). This was followed by a supporting role in The Clouded Yellow (1950) with Jean Simmons and Trevor Howard, then the lead in some more B pictures, The Dark Man (1950) and There Is Another Sun (1951). Reed said in June 1950 that "they tried to make me a star too soon."

Reed moved to the U.S. to make Flame of Araby (1952), starring Maureen O'Hara and Jeff Chandler. He returned to Britain to play the villain opposite Yvonne de Carlo and Rock Hudson in the Anglo-American production Sea Devils (1953); he was also part of the ensemble cast of Ealing Studios' The Square Ring (1953).

After making Captain Phantom (1953) in Italy, Reed starred in more British B movies, Marilyn (1953), Before I Wake (1955) and The Brain Machine (1956). He had a small role in Helen of Troy (1956).

=== Hollywood ===
Reed moved to Hollywood permanently in the late 1950s and guest starred on TV shows like Celebrity Playhouse and The Betty Hutton Show. He landed the title role in the 1950s television series Captain David Grief, based on short stories by Jack London. It ran for two series in syndication, and was the first television series made on location in Hawaii; the first nine episodes were shot on Maui before production moved to southern California.

Reed had support roles in films like The Notorious Landlady (1962) and appeared as a guest star in television series such as Bonanza, Kraft Mystery Theater, The Beachcomber, The Lloyd Bridges Show, The Great Adventure, Perry Mason and Daniel Boone.

His last feature film was Picture Mommy Dead (1966).

His last acting role was back in Britain, the BBC's Sherlock Holmes episode The Dancing Men in 1968.

== Personal life ==
Reed was the first husband of actress Joan Collins, whom he married on 24 May 1952. He is alleged to have raped her when dating and she married him out of shame. They were separated in 1954 and the marriage ended in divorce in 1956, after which Reed sued her for alimony, claiming that he had earned only $1,000 over the previous 12 months. He later withdrew this claim.

He died from cancer in 1974, aged 55, in London.

== Filmography ==
Year	Title	Role	Notes
1946	The Years Between	American	UK, uncredited
1946	Gaiety George	Prince (on stage)	UK, uncredited
1947	Dear Murderer	Jimmy Martin	UK
1947	The Brothers	Fergus Macrae	UK
1947	Night Beat	Felix Fenton	UK
1948	Daughter of Darkness	Dan	UK
1948	Daybreak	Olaf	UK
1949	The Lost People	Peter	UK
1949	Madness of the Heart	Joseph Rondolet	UK
1950	Blackout	Chris Pelley	UK
1950	The Clouded Yellow	Hick	UK
1951	The Dark Man	The Dark Man	UK
1951	There Is Another Sun	Racer	UK
1951	Flame of Araby	Prince Medina	US
1953	Sea Devils	Rantaine	US / UK
1953	The Square Ring	Rick Martell	UK
1953	Captain Phantom	Don Inigo da Costa	Italy
1953	Marilyn	Tom Price	UK
1955	The Brain Machine	Frank Smith	UK
1955	Before I Wake (U.S., 'Shadow of Fear')	Michael Elder	UK
1956	Helen of Troy	Ajax	US / Italy
1961	Pirates of Tortuga	Fielding	US, uncredited
1962	The Notorious Landlady	Miles Hardwicke	US
1966	Picture Mommy Dead	Anthony Flagmore	US
