= The Truth About Women =

1957 British film by Muriel Box

- British 1-sheet poster
- Directed by: Muriel Box
- Written by: Muriel Box; Sydney Box
- Produced by: Herbert Smith; Sydney Box
- Starring: Laurence Harvey; Julie Harris; Diane Cilento; Mai Zetterling; Eva Gabor
- Cinematography: Otto Heller
- Edited by: Anne V. Coates
- Music by: Bruce Montgomery
- Production company: Beaconsfield Productions (as Beaconsfield Films Ltd.)
- Distributed by: British Lion
- Release date: October 1957 (UK)
- Running time: 107 minutes
- Country: United Kingdom
- Language: English
- Budget: under £200,000

The Truth About Women is a 1957 British comedy film directed by Muriel Box and starring Laurence Harvey, Julie Harris, Mai Zetterling and Diane Cilento.

The film was not a commercial success.

== Plot ==
When his son-in-law comes to him with a woeful tale of an unhappy relationship and a belief that all women are impossible to love, elderly Sir Humphrey Tavistock calmly puts him straight. Tavistock regales him with decades-old anecdotes of found lovers and lost love.

== Cast ==
- Laurence Harvey as Sir Humphrey Tavistock
- Julie Harris as Helen Cooper
- Diane Cilento as Ambrosine Viney
- Mai Zetterling as Julie
- Eva Gabor as Louise
- Michael Denison as Rollo
- Derek Farr as Anthony
- Elina Labourdette as Comtesse
- Roland Culver as Charles Tavistock
- Wilfrid Hyde-White as Sir George Tavistock
- Marius Goring as Otto Kerstein
- Robert Rietti as the Sultan
- Catherine Boyle (Katie Boyle) as Diana
- Ambrosine Phillpotts as Lady Tavistock
- Jocelyn Lane as Saida (billed as Jackie Lane)
- Lisa Gastoni as Mary Maguire
- Hal Osmond as Baker

== Critical reception ==
The Monthly Film Bulletin wrote: "Lacking real wit or polish, this is an extravagantly upholstered charade, falling short of the sophisticated comedy of manners it sets out to be. Apart from Laurence Harvey's heavy and charmless Humphrey, the performances are good; on all their efforts are sacrificed to a dull script and uninspired direction."

Howard Thompson of The New York Times wrote:

An erratic but basically good-natured color pacing written, directed and produced by Muriel and Sydney Box. With Laurence Harvey heading a large, impressive cast ... Visually, the picture is luscious. The five episodes that carry the well-born hero from young manhood to the fireside spread out over beautifully tinted, lavish period and modern settings. The small army of ladies engulfing the poor bloke have been dressed to kill by an expert, Cecil Beaton. Smoothly, deviously and knowingly the picture slides along as if a good joke were tucked up one of the Beaton sleeves ... As an uncomplicated young painter who marries him and eventually dies in childbirth, our own American Miss Harris is splendid, far and away the best and least glittering thing in the picture. Her meeting with Mr. Harvey, in a stranded elevator, is a gem of a scene. The last section, as Mr. Harvey almost attains happiness with a wise, unselfish nurse, movingly played by Miss Zetterling, slides appropriately into a bittersweet but lighthearted fade-out. Of the large cast, such people as Michael Denison, Derek Farr, Marius Goring, Roland Culver and Wilfred Hyde-White bolster the opulent tapestry with effective bits. As for why it should take an intelligent, red-blooded Englishman more than fifty years to discover the "truth," as Mr. Harvey finally states it, we thought they learned that at Eton.

The Radio Times Guide to Films gave the film 2/5 stars, writing: "In a bizarre charade, Laurence Harvey plays a sort of Don Juan character, recalling his amorous, exotic adventures in Arabia, Paris, London, New York, the First World War and beyond. The moral is that one's first love is the only love that matters – aaah! – but the problem here is that Harvey is also something of a cold fish, not overly furnished with charm. The women make the most of their extended cameos, and pose in their Cecil Beaton costumes."

Leslie Halliwell said: "Tedious charade with neither wit nor grace."

TV Guide: "the direction is simply too serious for what should have been a much lighter comedy, so the film falls far short of its intentions".
