= The Clouded Yellow =

1950 British film directed by Ralph Thomas

- Directed by: Ralph Thomas
- Written by: Janet Green
- Based on: story by Janet Green
- Produced by: Betty E. Box
- Starring: Jean Simmons; Trevor Howard; Sonia Dresdel; Maxwell Reed
- Cinematography: Geoffrey Unsworth
- Edited by: Gordon Hales
- Music by: Benjamin Frankel
- Production company: Carillon Films
- Distributed by: General Film Distributors
- Release dates: 21 November 1950 (London); 25 November 1950 (UK)
- Running time: 95 minutes
- Country: United Kingdom
- Language: English
- Budget: £152,800
- Box office: £158,000 or £170,000

The Clouded Yellow is a 1950 British mystery film directed by Ralph Thomas, written by Janet Green, produced by Betty E. Box and starring Jean Simmons and Trevor Howard.

== Plot ==
David Somers, a former army officer who became a successful member of the British Secret Intelligence Service during World War II, is dismissed following the failure of a mission. The only work that he can find is cataloguing butterflies at the country house of Nicholas and Jess Fenton. Somers finds a mutual attraction with Sophie Malraux, Jess's niece. After the murder of Hick, a local gamekeeper and Jess's lover, suspicion wrongly falls on Sophie. She is considered mentally fragile because of the apparent suicide of her parents when she was six years old, although she has suppressed any memory of it.

Somers helps Sophie to evade arrest, and they flee together, with Somers using his secret service skills and contacts to stay one step ahead of the police and Willy Shepley, an SIS agent. After a cross-country chase, the pair arrive at Liverpool, planning to leave the country by ship. The true identity of the murderer of Hick is revealed to be Sophie's uncle Nicholas, who also killed Sophie's parents, because her father was another of Jess's lovers. Nicholas chases Sophie onto a warehouse roof, where he slips and falls into the path of a passing train and is killed.

== Cast ==
- Jean Simmons as Sophie Malraux
- Trevor Howard as David Somers
- Sonia Dresdel as Jess Fenton
- Maxwell Reed as Hick
- Barry Jones as Nicholas Fenton
- Kenneth More as Willy Shepley
- Geoffrey Keen as Police Inspector
- André Morell as Secret Service Chief
- Michael Brennan as Police Superintendent
- Gerard Heinz as Dr. Karl Cesare
- Lily Kann as Minna Cesare
- Eric Pohlmann as taxidermist
- Richard Wattis as employment agent
- Sandra Dorne as Kyra

== Production ==
=== Development ===
Ralph Thomas and Betty Box had both worked for her brother, Sydney Box, first collaborating when Thomas did the trailer for Miranda (1948). They found they had a rapport, so when Shepherd's Bush Studio shut down, and Thomas left Sydney Box to go under contract to the Rank Organisation, Betty Box came with him. Their first film together was The Clouded Yellow. It was made for Betty Box's company, Carillon Films.

The Clouded Yellow was based on an original script by Janet Green. It was developed by Sydney Box but he had decided to take a year long absence and gave the project to Box and Thomas. Green was paid £1,000. They wanted further work done on the script but Janet Green was unavailable and Eric Ambler was hired to do work on it.

Jean Simmons, who had made So Long at the Fair with Box, agreed to play the lead. Trevor Howard was borrowed from Herbert Wilcox, who had him under contract, to play the male lead. Kenneth More was cast in a minor role; it was the first of several films he would make for Box and Thomas.

Production coincided with a crisis in the British film industry – Betty Box says it was the only film being made in England in the first half of 1950. She managed to secure a distribution contract with Rank, which enabled her to borrow enough money to finance 70% of the budget. Box managed to raise the rest from Rank and the National Film Finance Corporation, each putting up fifty per cent. However, after Betty Box had signed all 48 of the contracts required by the bank, James Laurie of the NFFC decided he did not like the contract and withdrew his company's finance until changes were made. Rank refused to provide Box with finance to tide her over, so the producer borrowed the money against her own home. "I obviously wasn't happy about the situation, particularly as it was through no fault of my own", Box later wrote. Finance did not come through until five weeks into the film. "It was a brave thing for her to do and she didn't tell me until the picture was finished", said Thomas.

=== Shooting ===
Shooting took place in Newcastle, Liverpool and the Lake District. A significant proportion of the action was shot on location in Newcastle upon Tyne, featuring scenes on the quayside, around the Castle Keep and the Central Station, and the suburb of Jesmond. Some scenes were filmed in Liverpool's Chinatown, Toxteth, Liverpool Docks and on the Liverpool Overhead Railway, closed in 1956 and later dismantled.

Thomas said he enjoyed making the film. Maxwell Reed said his role was "not a big part but it's the best I've ever had." The supporting cast features a young Kenneth More. He made it while appearing in a play in London.

== Reception ==
The Monthly Film Bulletin wrote: "This melodrama is not excitingly enough made to compensate for improbabilities and clichés in the plot."

Kine Weekly wrote: "The picture certainly gets around – the Lake District, London and key Northern towns are visited – and its shrewdly varied settings cunningly amplify its big emotional and physical highlights. At the same time, polished acting and smooth dialogue subtly gloss over initial improbabilities. Hair-raising man-hunt and excellent frightened lady stuff in one, it is bound to register with both sexes and all classes."

Variety wrote: "Although the plot breaks little new ground, the film grips consistently because first-class direction keeps the suspense going full tilt right down to the final scene. Jean Simmons, in is one of the best roles she has had for years, and Trevor Howard make a strong marquee team."

The Observer called the film "a very foolish picture".

The New York Times called the film a "first-rate job of fast film-making in a crisp, naturalistic style, up and down the actual face of England, has been accomplished by all hands."

The film benefited from publicity arising from Jean Simmons' engagement and marriage to Stewart Granger. It was also helped by the fact that Trevor Howard and Simmons were among the most popular stars at the British box office.

Box later wrote that "the film finally opened to very good press notices and even better business, and the teething problems were forgotten as the tills started ringing sweet music. I found I'd done a better deal for myself than I realised–every time I'd had to put up another unit of finance I was due for an extra percentage of profit – and I felt that at last justice was being done. The profits were useful for keeping my head above water as Ralph and I prepared our next production and I looked out for good film stories to buy."

"I'm rather proud of that film", said Thomas, "Jean Simmons was lovely in it, so was Trevor Howard; it was a very good movie. And Sonia Dresdel was very good value for money; they don't make them like her any more – wonderful bravura."
