= St. John Legh Clowes =

South African writer and director (1907–1951)

- Born: 1907
- Died: 1951 (aged 43–44)
- Citizenship: South African citizenship
- Occupations: Writer and director
- Notable work: Grand Prix

St. John Legh Clowes (1907–1951) was a South African writer and film director.

== Biography ==
Clowes was born in East London, Cape Colony (now South Africa). His parents, Captain Philip Cecil Clowes and Daphne Scholz, were married in Cape Town in 1903. (Daphne's sister Avice married actor/writer Roland Pertwee in 1911.) His grandfather, and namesake, was married to Elizabeth Caroline Bingham, the daughter of Denis Arthur Bingham, 3rd Baron Clanmorris.

His paternal aunt was the writer Elinor Mordaunt. He died in London in 1951.

== Select credits ==
- Frozen Fate (1929) – writer
- Grand Prix (1934) – writer, director
- Soldier, Sailor (1944) – writer
- Battle for Music (1945) – writer
- Dear Murderer (1947) – original play
- Things Happen at Night (1948) – producer, writer
- No Orchids for Miss Blandish (1948) – writer, director
