= Cranston biography of Jean-Jacques Rousseau =

Book series (three volumes, 1983–1998)

Jean-Jacques Rousseau
- Author: Maurice Cranston
- Discipline: Biography
- Published: 1983–1998
- No. of books: 3

Maurice Cranston wrote a three-volume biography of the philosopher Jean-Jacques Rousseau, published between 1983 and 1998.

== Bibliography ==
Jean-Jacques: The Early Life and Work of Jean-Jacques Rousseau, 1712–1754

- Coleman, Patrick (1985). "Review of Jean-Jacques: The Early Life and Work of Jean-Jacques Rousseau, 1712-1754". The French Review. 58 (5): 730–731. ISSN 0016-111X. JSTOR 393110.
- Jack, Malcolm (1984). "Review of Jean Jacques: The Early Life and Work of Jean-Jacques Rousseau 1712-1754; Rousseau and Romantic Autobiography". Eighteenth-Century Studies. 18 (2): 267–270. doi:10.2307/2738549. ISSN 0013-2586. JSTOR 2738549.
- Kelly, Christopher (1992). "Review of Jean-Jacques; The Noble Savage". Ethics. 103 (1): 167–170. doi:10.1086/293483. ISSN 0014-1704. JSTOR 2381508.
- Kennedy, Emmet (1994). "Review of Jean-Jacques: The Early Life and Work of Jean-Jacques Rousseau, 1712-1754; The Noble Savage: Jean-Jacques Rousseau, 1754-1762, Maurice Cranston". The Journal of Modern History. 66 (1): 152–155. doi:10.1086/244799. ISSN 0022-2801. JSTOR 2124413.
- Mudrick, Marvin (1984). Cranston, Maurice (ed.). "The Man of Sentiment". The Hudson Review. 37 (1): 105–114. doi:10.2307/3851299. ISSN 0018-702X. JSTOR 3851299.
- Rosenberg, Aubrey (1993). "Review of Jean-Jacques: The Early Life and Work of 1712-1754; The Noble Savage: Jean-Jacques Rousseau 1754-1762, Maurice Cranston". The French Review. 67 (2): 357–358. ISSN 0016-111X. JSTOR 397388.

The Noble Savage: Jean-Jacques Rousseau, 1754–1762

- Braybrooke, David (1992). "Review of The Noble Savage: Jean-Jacques Rousseau, 1754-1762". The American Political Science Review. 86 (3): 778–779. doi:10.2307/1964143. ISSN 0003-0554. JSTOR 1964143. S2CID 146990521.
- Dent, N. J. H. (1992). "Review of The Noble Savage: Jean-Jacques Rousseau 1754-1762". Political Theory. 20 (2): 352–355. doi:10.1177/0090591792020002013. ISSN 0090-5917. JSTOR 192013. S2CID 220902106.
- Goodman, Dena (1992). "Review of The Noble Savage: Jean-Jacques Rousseau, 1754-1762". The American Historical Review. 97 (3): 839–840. doi:10.2307/2164810. ISSN 0002-8762. JSTOR 2164810.
- Jack, Malcolm (1991). "Review of The Noble Savage: Jean-Jacques Rousseau, 1754-1762". Eighteenth-Century Studies. 25 (2): 235–237. doi:10.2307/2738823. ISSN 0013-2586. JSTOR 2738823.
- Kelly 1992
- Kelly, Christopher (1998). "Review of The Solitary Self: Jean-Jacques Rousseau in Exile and Adversity". The Review of Metaphysics. 51 (4): 920–921. ISSN 0034-6632. JSTOR 20130308.
- Kennedy 1994
- Macdonald, H. Malcolm (1992). "Review of The Noble Savage: Jean Jacques Rousseau, 1754-1762; Rationalism in Politics and Other Essays". Social Science Quarterly. 73 (2): 475–476. ISSN 0038-4941. JSTOR 42863066.
- Mason, Haydn (1992). "Review of The Noble Savage: Jean-Jacques Rousseau, 1754–1762". History. 77 (250): 328–329. ISSN 0018-2648. JSTOR 24420841.
- Racevskis, Karlis (1992). "Review of The Noble Savage: Jean-Jacques Rousseau 1754–1762". Biography. 15 (4): 416–418. ISSN 0162-4962. JSTOR 23539696.
- Rosenberg 1993
- Trousson, R. (1994). "Review of The Noble Savage. Jean-Jacques Rousseau 1754-1762". Revue d'Histoire littéraire de la France. 94 (2): 318–319. ISSN 0035-2411. JSTOR 40531760.

The Solitary Self: Jean-Jacques Rousseau in Exile and Adversity

- Kelly, Christopher (1998). "Review of The Solitary Self: Jean-Jacques Rousseau in Exile and Adversity". The Review of Metaphysics. 51 (4): 920–921. ISSN 0034-6632. JSTOR 20130308.
- Kennedy, Emmet (1998). "Rev. of The Solitary Self". The Journal of Modern History. 70 (3): 701–703. doi:10.1086/235138. ISSN 0022-2801. JSTOR 10.1086/235138. S2CID 151903694.
- Simon, Julia (1998). "Review of The Solitary Self: Jean-Jacques Rousseau in Exile and Adversity". The American Historical Review. 103 (3): 850. doi:10.2307/2650579. ISSN 0002-8762. JSTOR 2650579.
