= Scott MacGregor (art director) =

British art director (1914–1971)

- Born: 22 October 1914; Edinburgh, Scotland, United Kingdom
- Died: 1971 (aged 56–57)
- Occupation: Art director
- Years active: 1946-1971 (film)

Scott MacGregor (1914–1971) was a British art director. He was originally a designer on theatrical productions before moving into film. In 1969 he was appointed head of production design at Hammer Films, replacing Bernard Robinson.

== Selected filmography ==
- Before I Wake (1955)
- Fire Maidens from Outer Space (1956)
- Jet Storm (1959)
- Don't Panic Chaps (1959)
- The Day They Robbed the Bank of England (1960)
- Oscar Wilde (1960)
- Doctor Blood's Coffin (1961)
- The Man Who Finally Died (1963)
- I've Gotta Horse (1965)
- The Frozen Dead (1966)
- Five Golden Dragons (1967)
- The Limbo Line (1968)
- Baby Love (1968)
- Taste the Blood of Dracula (1970)
- The Vampire Lovers (1970)
- Scars of Dracula (1970)
- The Horror of Frankenstein (1970)
- Burke & Hare (1971)
- Blood from the Mummy's Tomb (1971)
- On the Buses (1971)
- Mutiny on the Buses (1972)
- Vampire Circus (1972)

== Bibliography ==
- David Huckvale. Hammer Films' Psychological Thrillers, 1950-1972. McFarland, 2014.
