= The Passionate Stranger =

1957 British film by Muriel Box

- UK 1-sheet poster
- Directed by: Muriel Box
- Written by: Muriel Box; Sydney Box
- Produced by: Peter Rogers; Gerald Thomas
- Starring: Margaret Leighton; Ralph Richardson
- Cinematography: Otto Heller
- Music by: Humphrey Searle
- Distributed by: British Lion Films
- Release date: 26 February 1957
- Running time: 97 minutes
- Country: United Kingdom
- Language: English
- Budget: £140,000

The Passionate Stranger (U.S. title A Novel Affair) is a 1957 British drama film directed by Muriel Box and starring Margaret Leighton and Ralph Richardson. It was written by Box and Sydney Box. It uses the film within a film device, with the "real" part of the plot shot in black-and-white and the "fictional" element in colour.

== Plot ==
Carlo, an Italian man, is taken on as a chauffeur at an English country mansion, the home of Roger and Judith Wynter. She is a novelist who pens torrid escapist romantic fiction for the popular women's market, although in real life she is a respectable, unassuming woman, happily married to husband Roger who has been stricken with polio that leaves him immobile. She uses people she knows and situations she encounters as the raw material for her fictional flights of fancy. Judith is working on her latest novel titled The Passionate Stranger, a lurid tale of a bored and unsatisfied woman, with a pompous, disabled husband she despises, who embarks on a wild affair with her Italian chauffeur.

When Carlo later drives Judith to London to see her publisher, she goes to lunch leaving a copy of the manuscript in the car. Carlo finds and reads it. As he reads, the black-and-white film fades into a colour film of her novel:

The chauffeur, Mario, is driving the mistress back from London when a tyre bursts, and they are obliged to rent rooms in a small village pub. When she phones her husband Lord Hathaway, he is very cold and is only concerned about his need for the car the next morning. Lady Hathaway joins the chauffeur at a local fete where they dance together, and at the end of the evening Mario seduces her. Later, Lord Hathaway is shocked when, after a faint, the doctor informs Lord Hathaway that his wife is pregnant. When she confesses it is Mario's, he wants to dismiss him and raise the child as their own. Learning that Lady Hathaway is pregnant, Mario asks her to leave her husband and go away with him, but she says she will be loyal to her husband. So Mario plots to kill him, sabotaging his wheelchair, and tricking him into heading to the summerhouse which involves a slope. Lady Hathaway later finds him floating in the lake.

The film returns to black-and-white, and Carlo jumps to the conclusion that Judith harbours a repressed passion for him. Before their journey home, he puts sugar in the petrol tank and the car duly breaks down, but Judith refuses to leave the car. She accepts a lift from a passing motorist to take her to the nearest village, leaving Carlo with the car. He eventually reaches the pub where Judith has taken them rooms for the night, but she refuses his invitation to leave and attend a local dance, and so he goes alone. When they arrive home next day, Judith tells her husband that the pub landlord spotted Carlo wandering around the garden in the dark, and wants him to dismiss him, but Roger insists there must have been an innocent explanation.

Undaunted, Carlo continues to try to romance Judith, and to her bewilderment and alarm, he attempts to recreate situations and conversations from her novel. When she again brushes off his attentions, he becomes confused and angry. Eventually, Carlo proclaims his love and stresses her husband's inability to have children, but she tells him she loves her husband and they have two boys away at boarding school who will be returning the next day.

When she finds Roger's wheelchair in the lake, Judith at first thinks Carlo has again enacted the plot of her novel, but in fact her son accidentally ran it into the lake and Carlo has rescued him. Judith is most grateful, and Carlo expresses his undying love for her, but again she rejects him, and he decides he must leave. He boards a bus and finds himself sitting next to the Wynters' maid. Looks pass between them, and Carlo smiles.

== Cast ==
- Ralph Richardson as Roger Wynter / Sir Clement Hathaway
- Margaret Leighton as Judith Wynter / Leonie Hathaway
- Patricia Dainton as Emily / Betty
- Carlo Giustini as Carlo / Mario (dubbed by Robert Rietti, uncredited)
- Ada Reeve as old woman
- Andrée Melly as Marla
- Frederick Piper as Mr. Poldy
- Michael Shepley as Miles Easter
- Thorley Walters as Jimmy
- George Woodbridge as landlord
- Allan Cuthbertson as Dr. Stevenson
- John Arnatt as Maurice Lamport / Martin
- Barbara Archer as Doris the barmaid
- Marjorie Rhodes as Mrs. Poldy
- Megs Jenkins as Millie
- Michael Trubshawe as 2nd landlord
- Alexander Gauge as MC at dance

== Production ==
Leighton's casting was announced in May, 1956. The interior scenes were shot at Shepperton Studios, with location filming taking place at Chilworth, Surrey.

Box stated that the film was intended "to debunk the sentimental novel...a mild satire on romance as opposed to reality, and the unhappy consequences of confusing the two".

== Critical reception ==
The Monthly Film Bulletin wrote: "The middle section of this somewhat retrogressive film is a lengthy dramatisation, shot in colour, of Judith's book; and it soon appears that the sympathies of Muriel and Sydney Box lie securely in the contrived and overdressed melodramatics of this novel, which emerges as a kind of "Lady Chatterley's Chauffeur". When a black-and-white attempt at satire finally comes, it is both too late and too feeble. Ralph Richardson defends himself against the script with an attitude of preoccupied disdain. Margaret Leighton remains beautifully wrapped in Turgenev and Norman Hartnell; but Carlo Justini's chauffeur, despite the encouragement of his costumier, remains downright dull."

New York Times film critic Bosley Crowther wrote: "A thin and even tedious bit of kidding is being done in A Novel Affair ... It is neither novel nor much of an affair. All it is, precisely, is a story-within-a-story sort of thing – a little comedy to show that lady authors are not always the way they appear in what they write. ... Thanks to adroit performances by Miss Leighton and Sir Ralph, first as the simple, homely couple and then as the tinted lady and the peer, this little bit of nonsense from Muriel and Sydney Box is not quite as flimsy and pretentious as it may at first sound ... But the interior story is so ponderous, and it so completely outweighs the little black-and-white whimsey that surrounds it that it drags down the whole idea."

Allmovie described the film as "something of a comic precursor to The French Lieutenant's Woman".

Sky Movies commented that "Ralph Richardson delivers more than the script can reasonably expect."
