= The Company of Youth =

Acting school for young contract players for the Rank Organisation

The Company of Youth was a British acting school for young contract players for the Rank Organisation who were being groomed for stardom. It was commonly known as the Rank Charm School.

== History ==
The Company of Youth was a conscious attempt by J. Arthur Rank to manufacture stars similar to the Hollywood studio system. He was inspired by the success Gainsborough Pictures had in creating British stars like Stewart Granger, James Mason, Patricia Roc, Margaret Lockwood, and Phyllis Calvert.

Producer Sydney Box originally set up a Company of Youth at Riverside Studios in December 1945. Box put half a dozen young actors under contract and placed them in part-time roles while they learned their craft. Box transferred the company to Gainsborough in 1946, when he was recruited by the Rank Organisation.

The school was based at the church hall next to Rank's "B picture" studio at Highbury in London. Students were given an allowance of around £10 a week and trained in breathing, deportment, movement and mime, fencing, accent correction, play reading, script study, rehearsing of excerpts, remedial exercises, and diction. One writer described it as "a sort of cross between Lee Strasberg's Actors Studio and a London finishing school for young ladies."

The school's main acting teacher was Molly Terraine, with Olive Dodds as the administrator. Many of the students were called on to do publicity appearances for Rank at garden parties, cinema openings, and similar events. Producers who worked for the Rank Organisation seemed reluctant to use the students in many roles, and eventually, the school shut down in 1951.

Diana Dors said: "it was a good idea, basically, but it wasn't carried out very well." She said, "I loathed the Charm School and practically left show business because of the depressing effect it had on me."

According to Filmink "The Charm School was much mocked at the time, and it’s hard to discuss today without laughing, but students included names like Petula Clark, Claire Bloom, and Christopher Lee, as well as [Diana] Dors, so somebody associated with it knew what they were doing."

Most good-looking British actors of the 1950s who were under contract to the Rank Organisation were considered to be graduates of the school, even when they were not, such as Maureen Swanson.

Rank later briefly ran a "charm school" for cinema managers.

The company was the subject of a 1982 documentary, The Rank Charm School and a 1998 radio documentary, The Rank School of Charmers.

== Notable alumni ==
- Claire Bloom
- Beverly Brooks
- Petula Clark
- Carletta Coburn
- Joan Collins
- Hazel Court
- Patricia Dainton
- Diana Dors
- Sandra Dorne
- Patsy Drake
- Shirley Eaton
- Peggy Evans
- Elspet Gray
- Sonia Holm
- Sally Ann Howes
- Patrick Holt
- Jane Hylton
- Jill Ireland
- Kay Kendall
- Christopher Lee
- Carol Marsh
- Sandra Martin
- Patrick McGoohan
- Pete Murray
- Peggy Owens
- Maxwell Reed
- Joan Rice
- Susan Shaw
- Donald Sinden
- Anthony Steel
- Barbara Steele
- Josephine Stuart
- Margaret Thorburn
