= Muriel Box =

British film director and writer (1905–1991)

The Right Honourable The Lady Gardiner
- Born: Violette Muriel Baker; 22 September 1905; New Malden, Surrey, England, UK
- Died: 18 May 1991 (aged 85); Hendon, London, England, UK
- Occupations: Director, writer, screenwriter
- Spouses: Sydney Box (1935–1969; divorced); Gerald Gardiner, Baron Gardiner (1970–1990; his death)
- Children: 1 daughter

Violette Muriel Box, Baroness Gardiner, (22 September 1905 – 18 May 1991) was an English screenwriter and director, Britain's most prolific female director, having directed 12 feature films and one featurette. Her screenplay for The Seventh Veil (co-written with husband Sydney Box) won an Academy Award for Best Original Screenplay.

== Early life ==
Violette Muriel Baker was born in Simla, Poplar Grove, New Malden, Surrey, on 22 September 1905. She was the third child of Caroline Beatrice (née Doney) (1872–1961) and Charles Stephen Baker (d. 1945). Her mother had been a pupil teacher, a maid, and an assistant in a magic lantern shop. Her father worked as a clerk for the South Western Railway at Waterloo. Her family called young Muriel "Tiggy". She attended St Matthew's School, Tolworth, for her primary school years moving up to Holy Cross Convent in Wimbledon in 1915, but was expelled, mostly as she had not been baptised. She then transferred to Surbiton High School. Here she took ballet lessons and studied drama with Sir Ben Greet. In the 1920s, she met Joseph Grossman of Stoll Pictures which led to work as an extra in The Wandering Jew and in the thriller series The Old Man in the Corner.

In 1929, Baker left a typing job at Barcley Corsets in Welwyn Garden City, for the scenario department of British Instructional Pictures. As talkies were introduced, Barker was given the task of reading unsolicited manuscripts which led to her developing story writing and dialogue skills. She landed a job as continuity clerk on Anthony Asquith's Tell England (1931). She moved to British International Pictures at Elstree, where she worked on Alfred Hitchcock's Number Seventeen (1932).

== Career ==
In 1935, she met and married journalist Sydney Box, with whom she collaborated on nearly forty plays with mainly female roles for amateur theatre groups. Their production company, Verity Films, first released short wartime propaganda films, including The English Inn (1941), her first directing effort, after which it branched into fiction. The couple achieved their greatest joint success with The Seventh Veil (1945) for which they gained the Academy Award for Best Writing, Original Screenplay in the following year.

After the war, the Rank Organisation hired her husband to head Gainsborough Pictures, where she was in charge of the scenario department, writing scripts for a number of light comedies, including two for child star Petula Clark, Easy Money and Here Come the Huggetts (both 1948). Muriel Box occasionally assisted as a dialogue director, or re-shot scenes during post-production. Her extensive work on The Lost People (1949) gained her a credit as co-director, her first for a full-length feature. In 1951, her husband created London Independent Producers, allowing Box more opportunities to direct. Many of her early films were adaptations of plays, and as such felt stage-bound. They were noteworthy more for their strong performances than they were for a distinctive directorial style. She favoured scripts with topical and frequently controversial themes, including Irish politics, teenage sex, abortion, illegitimacy and syphilis — consequently, several of her films were banned by local authorities.

She pursued her favourite subject – the female experience – in a number of films, including Street Corner (1953) about women police officers, Somerset Maugham's The Beachcomber (1954), with Donald Sinden and Glynis Johns as a resourceful missionary, again working with Donald Sinden on Eyewitness (1956) and a series of comedies about the battle of the sexes, including The Passionate Stranger (1957), The Truth About Women (1958) and her final film, Rattle of a Simple Man (1964).

Box often experienced prejudice in a male-dominated industry, especially hurtful when perpetrated by another woman. Jean Simmons had her replaced on So Long at the Fair (1950), and Kay Kendall unsuccessfully attempted to do the same with Simon and Laura (1955). Many producers questioned her competence to direct large-scale feature films, and while the press was quick to note her position as one of very few women directors in the British film industry, their tone tended to be condescending rather than filled with praise.

== Later years ==
Muriel Box left film-making to write novels and created a successful publishing house, Femina, which proved to be a rewarding outlet for her feminism. She published her memoirs, Odd Woman Out, in 1974, and published Rebel Advocate, a biography of her second husband, Gerald Gardiner, in 1983.

== Personal life ==
She married Sydney Box in 1935 and gave birth to a daughter, Leonora the following year. They divorced in 1969. Her sister-in-law Betty Box was Head of Production at the Gainsborough Pictures studio in Poole Street, Hoxton, and her brother-in-law through Betty was Peter Rogers, producer of the Carry On series of British comedy films. In 1970, she married Gerald Austin Gardiner, who had been Lord Chancellor, who died in 1990. She died in Mote End, Nan Clark's Lane, Mill Hill, Hendon, Barnet, London on 18 May 1991, aged 85.

=== Daughter ===
Leonora went on to study at the Royal Academy from 30 September 1957 until December 1960, exhibiting at both the 1959 and 1960 Royal Academy of Arts Exhibitions, while living at Pond Cottage, Nan-Clark's Lane, Mill Hill NW7.

== Filmography ==
=== Screenwriting credits ===
- Too Young to Love (1960)
- The Truth About Women (1957)
- The Passionate Stranger (1957)
- Street Corner (1953)
- The Happy Family (1952)
- Christopher Columbus (1949)
- Here Come the Huggetts (1948)
- The Blind Goddess (1948)
- Daybreak (1948)
- Good-Time Girl (1948)
- Easy Money (1948)
- Portrait from Life (1948)
- When the Bough Breaks (1947)
- Holiday Camp (1947)
- Dear Murderer (1947)
- The Brothers (1947)
- The Man Within (1947)
- A Girl in a Million (1946)
- The Years Between (1946)
- The Seventh Veil (1945)
- 29 Acacia Avenue (1945)
- Alibi Inn (1935)

=== Directing credits ===
- Rattle of a Simple Man (1964)
- The Piper's Tune (1962, featurette for Children's Film Foundation
- Too Young to Love (1960)
- Subway in the Sky (1959)
- This Other Eden (1959)
- The Truth About Women (1957)
- The Passionate Stranger (1957)
- Eyewitness (1956)
- Simon and Laura (1955)
- To Dorothy a Son (1954)
- The Beachcomber (1954)
- A Prince for Cynthia (1953, short)
- Street Corner (1953)
- The Happy Family (1952)
- The Lost People (1949)
- The English Inn (1941, documentary short [credited as Muriel Baker])

== Sources ==
- Odd Woman Out by Muriel Box, published by Leslie Frewin, London, 1974
- Gainsborough Melodrama, edited by Sue Aspinall and Robert Murphy, published by the British Film Institute, London, 1983
