= Night Without Pity =

1961 British film by Theodore Zichy

Night without Pity
- Directed by: Theodore Zichy
- Screenplay by: Aubrey Cash
- Produced by: Jack Parsons
- Starring: Sarah Lawson; Neil McCallum; Alan Edwards
- Cinematography: Ken Hodges
- Edited by: Peter Pitt
- Production company: Parroch Films
- Release date: 1962
- Running time: 57 minutes
- Country: United Kingdom
- Language: English

Night Without Pity is a 1961 British crime film directed by Theodore Zichy and starring Sarah Lawson, Neil McCallum, Alan Edwards and Michael Browning.

== Plot summary ==
Crooks O'Brien and Randall break into Diana Martin's home to steal her husband's factory keys. Diana is alone with her small son, who, frightened by the intruders, falls from his bedroom window and is concussed. Diana agrees to hand over the keys if she can phone a doctor. O'Brien stays while Randall goes to rob the factory. When the doctor arrives he tries to overpower O'Brien, but he is knocked unconscious.

Meanwhile, Randall has got the loot and decided to doublecross O'Brien and flee. O'Brien forces Diana to drive after him. When Randall stops at a garage he and O'Brien fight, but when O'Brien has defeated him Diana threatens O'Brien with his own gun until the police arrive.

== Cast ==
- Sarah Lawson as Diana Martin
- Neil McCallum as O'Brien
- Alan Edwards as Randall
- Dorinda Stevens as girlfriend
- Michael Browning as Philip
- Patrick Newell as doctor
- Beatrice Varley as mother
- John Moulder-Brown as Geoffrey Martin
- Brian Weske as Arthur
- Vanda Godsell as tart

== Critical reception ==
The Monthly Film Bulletin wrote: " A weak script – which strains credulity even on the level of melodrama – crudely realised in cramped settings melodrama"

Kine Weekly wrote: "The story is close to events that have happened and the small-time crooks are typically base and inefficient, but neither the scriptwriter nor the director have paid enough attention to probability and the plot is badly frayed with loose ends. Some tension is created when the housewife is threatened by the crooks, but it is dissipated by interpolated shots of the husband playing gin rummy with his old mum, and of subsidiary and largely non-essential characters in a sleazy, all-night café. The acting is a cut above the story. "
