= Fiddlers Three =

The fiddlers three are characters featured in the English nursery rhyme "Old King Cole".

Fiddlers Three may also refer to:

- Fiddlers Three (operetta), a 1918 Broadway production that ran for 87 performances
- Fiddlers Three (1944 film), a British comedy
- Fiddlers Three (1948 film), a Three Stooges short
- Fiddlers Three (play), a 1972 work by Agatha Christie
- Fiddlers Three, a 1991 ITV situation comedy series
