= Cressida Granger =

British entrepreneur

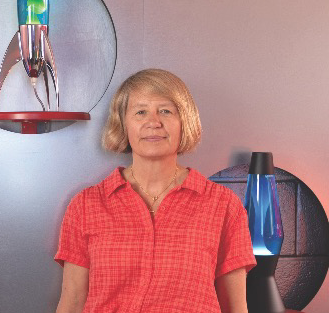
- Cressida Granger (2023)
- Education: University of Manchester
- Occupation: Entrepreneur
- Known for: Mathmos

Cressida Granger is a British entrepreneur. She is the owner and managing director of Mathmos, the lighting company founded by Edward Craven Walker, the inventor of the lava lamp.

== Career ==
Granger graduated in History of Art from the University of Manchester. She then became a vintage design dealer, specialising in furniture and lighting from the 1960s and early 1970s. During this period, she started buying lava lamps from the original factory in Poole and selling them at Camden Market.

Inventor and owner Edward Craven Walker and his wife, Christine, offered her the opportunity to take over the original lava lamp business. Alongside business partner David Mulley, Granger spent the next ten years repositioning and growing the Mathmos company. They bought out the Craven Walkers over several years, with Edward Craven Walker remaining a consultant until his death in 2000; Christine remains close to Mathmos.

Mathmos grew strongly during the 1990s, with British-made lava lamps finding a worldwide audience. Mathmos won a host of Business and Marketing Awards, including a Queen's Award for Export in 1997 and 2000.

In 1998, David Mulley left Mathmos, and Granger became Mathmos's sole owner and managing director. The following year, she was on the shortlist of four for the Veuve Clicquot Business Woman of the Year Award. Granger spent the next decade diversifying the business into different ambient lighting products with a team of internal and external designers; this won Mathmos new customers and several prestigious design awards.

Mathmos retained its British manufacture of the original lava lamp range, gently expanding it to include new models. Around 2010, Granger decided to narrow Mathmos's focus to its quality lava lamp range and to focus on direct-to-consumer sales. Mathmos now directly supplies customers all over Europe with its much-enlarged range, from small candle-powered lava lamps to giant floor-standing versions.

In 2023, Mathmos celebrated its 60th anniversary by opening a factory shop in its original home in Poole, Dorset. Granger and the Mathmos team also worked with five creatives, including Duran Duran, Rankin, and Sabine Marcelis, to produce limited-edition customised versions of its classic 1963 design, Astro.

== Creative industry activities ==
Granger was part of the Government Innovation Review Committee with James Dyson and Terence Conran in 2003. She has sat on selection and judging panels for various design bodies including 100% Light, D&AD Awards, and Design Nation Awards. Granger lectures occasionally at Ravensbourne Design College on entrepreneurship in design businesses. Granger is a director of the Made in Britain (campaign), a campaign seeking to establish a marque to identify British-made goods.

== Business and marketing awards ==
- Queen's Awards for Export 2000 and 1997
- Veuve Clicquot Woman of the Year Finalist 1999
- Fast Track 100 (3rd fastest growing manufacturer 1999)
- Yell Award best commercial website 1997
- Design Week Best Consumer website 1998

== Design awards ==
Queen's Awards for Export (1997 and 2000) Red Dot Awards: 2006 (Grito), 2002 (Tumbler), 2001 (Bubble)

Gift Magazine Design Homewares winner 2005 (Airswitch tc)
Design Week commendations: 2004 (Airswitch Az), 2003 (Aduki), 2002 (Tumbler), 2001 (Fluidium)
House and Garden best consumer product 2004. (Airswitch Az)
Form 2001 Award (Tumbler)
Industrial Design Excellence Award (IDEA) 2001 (Bubble)
D&AD commendation 2001 (Bubble)
Light Magazine Decorative Lighting Award 2001 (Bubble)
FX Magazine finalist best lighting product 2000 (Fluidium)
