= Rose Alba =

Egyptian-born British film actress (1918–2005)

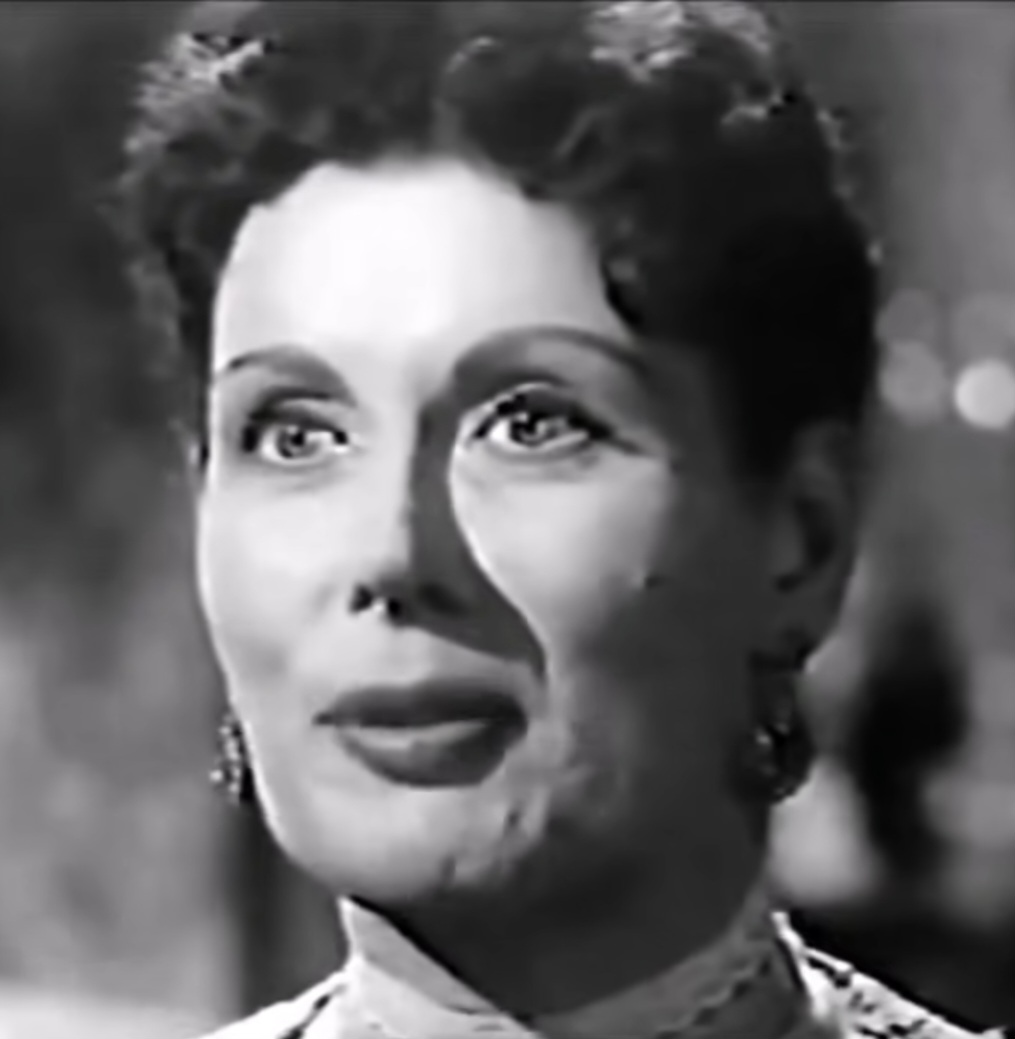
- Alba in an episode of One Step Beyond (1961)
- Born: 5 February 1918; Cairo, Egypt
- Died: 2 December 2005 (aged 87); London, England
- Occupation: Film actress
- Years active: 1956–1982

Rose Alba (born Felicity Mary Devereux; 5 February 1918 – 2 December 2005) was an Egyptian-born British film actress.

She also acted in TV series, such as The Persuaders!, in the episode "Angie, Angie" (1971), as Madame La Gata.

She died in December 2005 in London, England at the age of 87.

== Filmography ==
Year	Title	Role	Notes
1955	Il Fallco d'oro	Gertrude Montefalco	
1956	Shadow of a Man	Cabaret Singer	
1961	Mary Had a Little...	Duchess of Addlecombe	
1963	Eves on Skis	Elizabeth (voice)	directed by Edward Craven Walker
1965	Thunderball	Madame Bouvard	
1969	School for Sex	Countess of Burwash	
1971	"Angie... Angie", 10th episode of The Persuaders!	Madama La Gata	Rose Alba at IMDb
1972	Fourmose	Landlady	
1979	The Passage	Madame Alba	
1980	City of Women		Uncredited
1983	Funny Money	Mrs. de Salle	(final film role)
