= Crane (TV series) =

British TV drama series (1963–1965)

- Crane featured in the TV Times
- Created by: Patrick Alexander; Jordan Lawrence
- Starring: Patrick Allen; Sam Kydd; Gerald Flood; Laya Raki; Bruce Montague
- Country of origin: United Kingdom
- No. of series: 3
- No. of episodes: 39 (37 missing)

Production
- Producer: Jordan Lawrence
- Running time: 60 min.
- Production company: Associated-Rediffusion

Original release
- Network: ITV
- Release: 2 April 1963 – 25 January 1965

Related
- Orlando (TV series)

Crane is a British black and white adventure series that aired on ITV from 1963 to 1965. It was shown on Monday nights at 8 PM.

== Plot ==
The series was based around Richard Crane (Patrick Allen) who was a successful city businessman who was tired of the big city rat race. He took his money and retired to the sun-drenched shores of Morocco, near Casablanca, investing his money in a beachside café and boat.

Having let it be known that his services were available for import and export assignments, he soon found himself involved in minor smuggling activities (tobacco and alcohol, but no drugs, although the series never explained how he made a profit smuggling in a country where cigarettes over the counter are already a minimal fraction of the usual price elsewhere and Casablanca is over 300 km from the nearest border by sea). However, this brought him to the attention of the local chief of police, Colonel Mahmoud (Gerald Flood). The pair developed a healthy respect for each other and there were times when they would join forces against a common enemy. Colonel Mahmoud was assisted by Inspector Larbi played by Bruce Montague.

Crane's only real friend was an ex-Foreign Legionnaire named Orlando O'Connor (Sam Kydd), who became his trusted confidant. The glamour in the show was Halima (Laya Raki), a young Arab girl Crane employed to run the bar in his café.

== Particularities ==
The location filming was shot in Morocco mainly by Christopher Hodson, whilst the interior filming was studio-bound and filmed in the studios at Wembley in London with various directors.

The series was originally planned as a 'midsummer filler programme', only to last one season of 13 episodes, but it proved so popular that it returned for a second season of 13 episodes and even a third one of 13 episodes.

It spawned another series, this one aimed at children and called Orlando, based on one of its characters and starring Sam Kydd. This ran for 76 episodes of 30 minutes, running from 1965 to 1968 (one show ended January 1965, the other started April 1965).

== Episodes ==
=== Series 1 (1963) ===
Episode	Title	First aired
1	"A Death of No Importance"	2 April 1963
When a friend of Crane's is killed, he hunts the man through the streets of Casablanca.
Guest stars: Michael Robbins as Jennings, Jennifer Browne as Margot, Guy Deghy as Primo, Gábor Baraker as Dupuis, James Bree as McEligot.
2	"Bad Company"	9 April 1963
Crane and Orlando pick up a young hitch-hiker and find themselves in trouble.
Guest stars: Katherine Blake as Sonia, Charles Tingwell as Albert Ringwood, Desmond Jordan as Inspector Slimene, David Nettheim as Chavez.
3	"The Cannabis Syndicate"	16 April 1963
Crane and Mahmoud work together to stop a murder for sale syndicate which wants them both dead.
Guest stars: Peter Reynolds as Austin Crispin, Derek Benfield as Osman, David Graham as Sharif Mohammed, John Herrington as the doctor, Nicholas Evans as the servant.
4	"My Deadly Friend."	23 April 1963
Someone is trying to get Crane arrested on false charges.
Guest stars: Bruce Montague as Inspector Larki, Anthony Steele as Gil, Thalia Kouri as Rosamaria, Richard Davies as Willie Jones, Geoffrey Colville as Aubrey Feltham, Arnold Yarrow as Louis Barreto, Henry Lincoln as Arab guide.
5	"The Executioners"	30 April 1963
Crane and Orlando are put in danger after helping a wounded man, being hunted in Casablanca.
Guest stars: Alexander Davion as David, Warren Mitchell as Dorfmann, Bryan Woolfe as Malachi, Cyril Shaps as Rabbi, Sydney Arnold as Tailor, Barbara Bermel as Maid, Gordon Rollings as Doctor, Eileen Way as Hannah.
6	"Yesterday's Woman"	7 May 1963
Someone is trying to kill Madeleine and blame an innocent man for the crime.
Guest stars: Madi Hedd as Madeleine, Donald Morley as Latour, Rex Garner as Sergeant Fazil, Terry Bale as 1st Policeman, Louis Raynes as 2nd Policeman.
7	"The Price of Friendship"	14 May 1963
Crane and Mahmoud are looking for a gang of thieves in Casablanca, one of whom may be a dangerous killer.
Guest stars: Dermot Walsh as Haufmann, Sally Nesbitt as Jacqueline, Desmond Newling as Roberts, Edmund Bailey as Fatim.
8	"Three Days To Die"	21 May 1963
Crane believes a murder convict is innocent but only has three days before he is executed.
Guest stars: Peter Bowles as Nikkolai, Reginald Barratt as Inspector Misrai, Margot Van der Burgh as Maitre Zem, Brian Cant as Kramm, Charles Carson as Jean Collard, Gertan Klauber as Habbas, Edward Cast as Guard.
9	"My Brother's Keeper"	28 May 1963
Mahmoud is trying to find a callous murderer in Casablanca, but the Foreign Legion will reveal nothing, so he seeks Crane's help.
Guest stars: Barry Keegan as Szabo, Alec Mango as Dr. Ahbib, Richard Marner as Alexis, Maitland Moss as a Priest.
10	"The Unwanted"	4 June 1963
An orphan taken in by Crane puts him and his friends' lives in danger.
Guest stars: Peter Newton as Abba, Steve Plytas as Krasses, John Hollis as Hamid.
11	"Return Of A Hero"	11 June 1963
Crane rescues a pursued man and comes up with a mystery involving a yellow rabbit.
Guest stars: Edgar Wreford as Matthews, John Rumney as Mickey the Crook, Arthur Hewlett as the Colonel.
12	"The Golden Attraction"	18 June 1963
A corpse is discovered in a newly dug grave and Crane is dragged into the matter against his will.
Guest stars: Alan Tilvern as Paul Harrington, Peter Arne as Michael Harrington, Nicholas Evans as Boy.
13	"A Case Of Dolls"	25 June 1963
Crane and Orlando find a crate floating in the sea, which brings them to the attention of some very nasty men.
Guest stars: John Bennett as Smith, George Coulouris as Dr. Jackson, Alec Mango as Chatterji, Dallas Cavell as Customs official, Michael Mellinger as Hotel receptionist.

=== Series 2 (1964) ===
Episode	Title	First aired
1	"The Death Of Mary Vetier"	13 January 1964
A beautiful woman brings murder and treachery into Crane's life.
Guest stars: Patricia Haines as Marie, Peter Vaughan as Goddard, Gertan Klauber as Darius, Michael Hawkins as Martin.
2	"Epitaph For A Fat Woman"	20 January 1964
A friend's son fails to arrive home from school so Crane follows the trail to death and heartbreak for his friends.
Guest stars: Ingrid Hafner as Selina, William Marlowe as Pasquale, Emrys James as Gantz, David Nettheim as Gamal, James Culliford as Aldo, David Graham as Halif.
3	"Dead Reckoning"	27 January 1964
Crane reluctantly agrees to help get a man out of prison only to nearly get killed in the attempt.
Guest stars: Richard Vernon as Wolsey, Colin Gordon as Lung, Jan Waters as Liz, Richard Davies as Willie Jones, Sheila Keith as Mrs. Ambrose, Bartlett Mullins as Governor, Brian Cant as Man.
4	"Picture Of My Brother"	3 February 1964
Mahmoud seeks Crane's help in bringing the murderous Venza gang to justice.
Guest stars: Louis Rayner as Abdul, Bill Nagy as Venza, Jennifer White as Jasmina.
5	"Two Rings For Danger"	10 February 1964
Crane is suspected by the brother and Mahmoud when it turns out he was the last person to see a murdered man alive.
Guest stars: Dudley Foster as Charles, Annette Andre as Petra, Job Stewart as Alphonse, Sydney Bromley as Slotz, Julian Sherrier as Dr. Sul.
6	"Death Is A Black Camel"	17 February 1964
Mahmoud must solve a baffling case, while Crane has to keep a rendezvous from which he may not return.
Guest stars: Philip Latham as Salbierre, Ric Hutton as Vanel, Lee Richardson as Corto, Patrick Godfrey as Dr. Launay, Reg Lye as Stanley, Gábor Baraker as Fat policeman.
7	"The Secret Assassin"	24 February 1964
Crane is invited to Ahmed's Palace as an honoured guest but gets a reception which makes him doubt Ahmed.
Guest stars: Cyril Luckham as Mouley Ahmed, Isobel Black as Zuida, Donald Bisset as Muller.
8	"A Mouthful Of Ashes"	2 March 1964
Crane gives Orlando a ticket to the theatre, with no idea that he is sending him into danger, in which he too will become involved.
Guest stars: Anthony Newlands as Stark, Maxine Audley as Freda, Arthur White as Pirelli.
9	"Recoil"	9 March 1964
Crane and Orlando accept a Contessa's invitation to go to her villa, not knowing that Crane's murder is planned.
Guest stars: Patricia Kneale as Contessa d'Avezzano, Paul Eddington as Dr. Stampini, Richard Hurndall as Fausto.
10	"Gypsy's Warning"	16 March 1964
Philipe plans revenge on a police informer and the cards of a gypsy lead Crane into violence and murder.
Guest stars: John Woodvine as Philipe, Howard Goorney as a Gypsy, Harold Innocent as Jacko.
11	"Knife In The Dark"	23 March 1964
Orlando is found on the beach with blood on his hands and is suspected of murder after a quarrel the night before.
Guest stars: Derek Sydney as Arif, Michael Mellinger as Abdoul, Zooey Zephyr as Mokahl, Stephanie Bidmead as Annette Brillon, John G. Heller as Bartender.
12	"Murder Is Waiting"	30 March 1964
Crane is after a killer hidden in Casablanca and receives an invitation which leads him into danger.
Guest stars: Keith Anderson as Sweeper, Basil Dignam as Raswani, David Andrews as Marcel, Harry Landis as Ben Zeda, Roger Delgado as Barman, Irene Prador as Mrs. Kirschbaum.
13	"Man Without A Past"	15 June 1964
A gang of thieves try to murder Crane to stop him clearing an innocent man.
Guest stars: Patrick Troughton as Hugo Krantz, Alan Wheatley as Michaud, Anthony Baird as Sergeant Miraz, Royston Tickner as Sgt. Khatib, Joby Blanshard as Rahman, Hal Dyer as Hostess, Michael Allaby as Doctor.

=== Series 3 (1964-5) ===
Episode	Title	First aired
1	"Death Is A Closed Door"	26 October 1964
Crane has to turn down a friend who is trying to save a threatened man.
Guest stars: Sandor Elès as Shafik, Valarie Sarruf as Zena, Camilla Hasse as Raya, Russell Waters as Doctor, Eric Francis as Undertaker, Jeffrey Isaac as Policeman.
2	"T.N.T."	2 November 1964
Men unskilled in the use of explosives put Crane's life in danger.
Guest stars: Edwin Richfield as Steve Hanna, Delphi Lawrence as Lisa Martes, Barry Linehan as Harvey Troop, Henry Lincoln as Mogista.
3	"The Third Bullet"	9 November 1964
A telephone call from an unknown woman puts Crane's life in danger from an assassin.
Guest stars: Leonard Trolley as Shaab, Felix Felton as Major Culcao, Laurence Hardy as Dr. Salas, Brian Badcoe as Raoul, Peter Halliday as Eladio, Peter Birrel as 1st Guard, Bruce Wightman as 2nd Guard, Margaret Whiting as Tina Mondrego.
4	"A Danger To Others"	23 November 1964
When Julie Lamont disappears, Crane and Orlando are asked to find her. They expect to find her dead but there are surprises in store.
Guest stars: Sally Home as Julie Lamont, Eric Pohlmann as Dr. Knunsden, Diana Lambert as Francine, John Bryans as Dr. Mustapha, Michael Godfrey as Perez.
5	"Death Walks Beside Me"	30 November 1964
Johnnie, an old friend asks for Crane's help but the request may be impossible for Crane.
Guest stars: John Bonney as Johnnie, Christopher Carlos as Jericho, John Cazabon as Perrichon, Gábor Baraker as Cairo, Reginald Barratt as Public prosecutor, Conrad Monk as Guard.
6	"The Man With The Big Feet"	7 December 1964
A local mystic prophesies that Orlando will die. Crane investigates.
Guest stars: Bruno Barnabe as The Master, Campbell Singer as Lewis, Vanda Godsell as Mrs Lewis, Peter Laird as Halima's cousin.
7	"In Trust Find Treason"	14 December 1964
Mahmoud's reputation comes into question so Crane springs to his defence.
Guest stars: Ivor Dean as Aldo Romitu, Yolande Turner as Allegria, Robert Cartland as Gadulla.
8	"The Painted Lady"	21 December 1964
Crane chance meeting Louisa reveals a very dangerous lady.
Guest stars: Moira Redmond as Louisa, Richard Carpenter as Barjou, Harvey Hall as Otto, George Pravda as Carl Hassler.
9	"Moving Target"	28 December 1964
An old enemy, a military man, seeks Mahmoud's life.
Guest stars: Scott Forbes as Major Seaford, John Carson as Hennessey-Bodley, Ursula Howells as Stella.
10	"A Cargo Of Cornflower"	4 January 1965
Offered a job of transporting cornflour, Crane is suspicious when they won't let him inspect the cargo. Then Orlando goes missing.
Guest stars: Peter Bowles as Vincent Moro, Edina Ronay as Carmena, Mark Kingston as Flavio, John Hollis as Djiba, David Nettheim as Aziz.
11	"A Violent Animal"	11 January 1965
Crane's smuggling activities has caused a man from the mainland to come to kill him.
Guest stars: Peter Dyneley as Peter Garvey, Michael Mellinger as Achmet, Arthur White as Pirelli, Keith Barron as Rene Leclerc, John Cater as Afiz, Arthur Blake as Sgt. Zahaz, Jolyon Booth as Gibbah, Michael Allaby as Policeman.
12	"The Death Of Karaloff"	18 January 1965
Mahmoud has been ordered to keep Karaloff, a known criminal and sworn enemy alive.
Guest stars: Denys Graham as Karaloff, Tony Steedman as Brigadier Harris, Robert Gillespie as Ames, Philip Stone as Boris, Aubrey Morris as Mustafa, John Garvin as Doctor.
13	"The Man In The Gold Waistcoat"	25 January 1965
The waistcoat caused Crane to be involved in the death of a man found in the desert and now he's running for his life from a band of men intent on killing him.
Guest stars: Steve Plytas as Franz Bauer, Alan Wheatley as Dr. Hilfe, William Devlin as Sheik Gamal, Alan MacNaughtan as The Major, Nicolas Chagrin as Selim.
