= Allaby =

Allaby is a surname. Notable people with the surname include:

- Eric Allaby (born 1943), Canadian politician
- Michael Allaby (1933–2025), British author and actor
