= Stanley Morgan (author) =

British actor (1929–2018)

- Born: 10 November 1929; Liverpool, Lancashire, England
- Died: 24 August 2018 (aged 88)
- Occupations: Author; actor
- Spouse: Linda (m. 1973)
- Children: 4

Stanley Morgan (10 November 1929 – 24 August 2018) was an English writer and actor. He wrote fiction, in the comedy and thriller genres and had more than 40 books published between 1968 and 2006.

== Biography ==
Originally an actor, Morgan had many jobs as a young man, including sewing machine salesman, debt collector and bank clerk. In 1951, Morgan emigrated to Canada where he spent some time working in the Bank of Nova Scotia. In 1955, he emigrated again, this time to Southern Rhodesia. He resumed his acting career there and was sponsored to return to London after winning a Best Actor award. Upon returning to London, Morgan featured mostly in voice-overs ("Mullardability" the documentary he voiced for Mullard was nominated for the Special Film BAFTA in 1970), although he did have a small role in the James Bond film Dr. No playing the Concierge in the casino who first introduces Sean Connery as James Bond. Most of his acting credits were in second-feature crime shorts filmed at Merton Park Studios.

Whilst between acting jobs in the late 1960s, Morgan began to write seriously and his first novel The Sewing Machine Man was published in 1968. Allegedly autobiographical, the novel revolved around the character Russ Tobin and Morgan went on to write a further 18 novels in the series. The latest of the Russ Tobin novels was published in 2005 after Morgan came out of retirement, mainly due to renewed interest in his work via the internet.

Along with George Harrison and Paul McCartney, Morgan was an alumnus of the Liverpool Institute High School for Boys, which he attended between 1945 and 1946.

In August 2018, Morgan's webmaster announced his death on his website. Morgan died on 24 August 2018.

As of 2024, his estate have begun to publish his work as eBooks via Amazon.

== Bibliography ==
=== Russ Tobin series ===
The Russ Tobin series tells the story of a happy-go-lucky 20-something Liverpool lad who travels the world investigating life. Starting in Liverpool, he goes on to have adventures in London, Portugal, Majorca, Nairobi, Nassau, Miami, New York, Toronto, Las Vegas, Tahiti, Sydney, Co. Kildare, Ireland, Los Angeles and finally returning to Brighton for his last hurrah.

- The Sewing Machine Man (1968) The Harcourt Press (hardback) Mayflower (paperback)
- The Debt Collector (1970) Mayflower (paperback)
- The Courier (1971) Mayflower (paperback)
- Come Again Courier (1972) Mayflower (paperback)
- Tobin Takes Off (1973) Mayflower (paperback)
- Tobin On Safari (1973) Mayflower (paperback)
- Tobin In Paradise (1974) Mayflower (paperback)
- Tobin In Trouble (1974) Mayflower (paperback)
- Tobin For Hire (1975) Mayflower (paperback)
- Tobin in Las Vegas (1975) Mayflower (paperback)
- Tobin In Tahiti (1975) Futura Books (paperback)
- Tobin Down Under (1976) Futura Books (paperback)
- Russ Tobin's Bedside Guide to Smoother Seduction (1976) Star Books (paperback)
- Here Comes Tobin (1977) Futura Books (paperback)
- Russ Tobin : Hard Up (1977) Star Books (paperback)
- Russ Tobin : Up Tight (1977) WH Allen (hardback) Star Books (paperback)
- Russ Tobin In Hollywood (1978) WH Allen (hardback) Star Books (paperback)
- Tobin Among The Stars (1979) Star Books (paperback)
- Tobin Goes Cuckoo (2005) Twenty-First Century Publishing (paperback)

=== Fly Boys series ===
The Fly Boys series spanned three books of high farce, documenting the adventures of Glamour Airlines, a new venture set up by a millionaire who wins a fleet of aircraft in a poker game.

- The Fly Boys (1974) Hart-Davis, MacGibbon (hardback) Mayflower (paperback)
- The Fly Boys In London (1975) Hart-Davis, MacGibbon (hardback) Mayflower (paperback)
- Skyjacked (1976) WH Allen (hardback) Star Books (paperback)

=== Michael Morgan Adventure series ===
The Michael Morgan books feature a rugged British secret agent on missions to Africa with his partner. Octopus Hill was actually written before the first Russ Tobin book, but rejected as too similar to James Bond. It was only published after the Tobin books began to find success.

- Octopus Hill (1970) Mayflower (paperback)
- Mission To Katuma (1973) Mayflower (paperback)

=== Randy Comfort series ===
The Randy Comfort books are comedies, similar in the style to the Tobin books and feature Randy Comfort, a hunky unemployed layabout who lands himself a dream job as handyman to the rich and beautiful in a luxury apartment complex in London.

- The Rise Of Randy Comfort (1976) Futura Books (paperback)
- Randy Comfort Rise Again (1977) Star Books (paperback)

=== Gabriel Horn series ===
Gabriel Horn is the spoilt son of a successful business man who is forced to earn his way onto the board of his Father's company, by being sent around the world on a tiny budget. Originally planned as a series in the style of the Tobin books, but only one book was published.

- A Blow For Gabriel Horn (1977) W.H. Allen (hardback) Star Books (paperback)

=== Albert Shifty series ===
Another attempted new character intended for further serialisation - Albert Shifty is an odd-job man on a new estate who does loft conversions.

- Inside Albert Shifty (1977) Star Books (paperback)

=== Other novels (non-comedy) ===
All of Stanley Morgan's action thriller novels below were loosely themed around power and revenge, although none were related to each other.

- Too Rich To Live (1979) USA Fawcett Gold Medal (paperback)
- Too Rich To Live (1980) UK Hamlyn (hardback)
- Too Rich To Live (1981) UK Hamlyn (paperback)
- The Dark Side Of Destiny (1982) Fawcett Gold Medal
- Laura Fitzgerald (1983) Fawcett Gold Medal (paperback)
- Raven (1989) Lynx Books (paperback)
- Trance (2006) Twenty-First Century (paperback)

== TV and filmography ==
=== Films ===
- The Sleepwalkers 1959 (unreleased)
- Gorgo (1960) – Sub-Lieutenant in Submarine Control (uncredited)
- Clue of the Twisted Candle (1960, Merton Park Studios) – Sgt. Anson
- The Clue Of The Silver Key (1961, Merton Park Studios) – Sgt. Anson
- The Silent Weapon (1961, Merton Park Studios) – Sergeant Dobbs
- Konga (1961, Merton Park Studios) – Insp. Lawson
- Partners In Crime (1961, Merton Park Studios) – Sergeant Rutledge
- The Square Mile Murder (1961 Merton Park Studios) – Detective Sergeant
- The Share Out (1962, Merton Park Studios) – Detective Sgt. Anson
- Hair of the Dog (1962) – Jim Lester
- Dr No (1962) – Concierge in Casino (uncredited)
- The L-Shaped Room (1962) – Waiter in Club
- On the Beat (1962) – Policeman (uncredited)
- Doomsday at Eleven (1963) – Wylie
- Séance on a Wet Afternoon (1964) – Man in Trilby
- Night Train To Paris (1964) – Plainclothesman
- Troubled Waters (1964) – Rvd. Wilcox
- The Return of Mr. Moto (1965) – Inspector Jim Halliday

=== TV ===
- Never Back Losers (1962, Merton Park Studios) – Sgt. Anson / Detective Sgt. Anson / Sergeant Rutledge
- Sir Francis Drake (1962) – Lieutenant
- Crane (1963)
- The Invisible Asset (1963, Merton Park Studios) – Airline Clerk
- Gideon's Way (1964–1966) – Det. Insp. Wallace / Policeman at Hospital (uncredited) (final appearance)

=== Voice-overs ===
- Someone Special (1966) – Women's British Royal Naval Service Recruitment film
- Sugar As Energy (1967) – British Sugar Bureau educational film for Schools
- Vinyl Plastics in Building Design (1967) – Imperial Chemical Industries documentary about the use of vinyl plastics in building
- Men For Tomorrow (1968) – British Army Recruitment film
- Looking At Paperwork (1968) – British Productivity Council film regarding the importance of O & M in business administration
- Drawing In Metric (1969) – Central Office of Information film for architects changing over to metric units within the construction industry.
- Mullardability (1969) – A Mullard film showing their wide range of products in the field of electronics

== Interviews ==
- A Comprehensive list of interviews is maintained at the Official website
- James Bond interview at From Sweden with Love
