= Edana Romney =

South African actress (1919–2002)

- Edana Romney, 1948, London
- Born: 15 March 1919; Johannesburg, Union of South Africa
- Died: 17 December 2002 (aged 83); Santa Maria, California, U.S.
- Other name: Edna Rubenstein
- Occupations: Actress, Writer
- Spouse: John Woolf (m. 1946; div. 1955)

Edana Romney (15 March 1919 – 17 December 2002) was a South African actress, writer, and television presenter, based in London and later in Southern California.

== Early life ==
Born Edna Rubenstein in Johannesburg, Romney was of Jewish ancestry, her paternal grandfather being an Irish Jew who had emigrated to South Africa.

Romney trained as a dancer from an early age and made her performing debut in Johannesburg in 1930, the year she turned eleven. Relocating to London, Romney, then 14, successfully auditioned for the Royal Academy of Dramatic Arts (RADA), claiming to be the eligibility age of 16, and won a scholarship to study at RADA in 1935 and 1936.

== Career ==
=== Early career ===
After leaving RADA, Romney acted mostly in UK regional theatre productions, including the Prince's Theatre, Bristol production of the Matheson Lang play The Matador in 1936. She appeared in the West End production of James Bridie's Tobias and the Angel at St Martin's Theatre in 1938. In the same year she performed in the Regent's Park Open Air productions of Tobias and the Angel and as Titania in A Midsummer Night's Dream.

The first of Romney's occasional screen acting roles was a reprise of her theatrical role in a 1939 BBC Television version of Tobias and the Angel. She made her feature film debut in East of Piccadilly (1941), playing the small but pivotal role of the victim murdered in the film's opening sequence.

=== Corridor of Mirrors ===
Although her second film role, in Alibi (1942), was only incidental, Romney formed a production company with the film's screenwriter Rudolph Cartier. The partnership acquired the rights to the 1941 Chris Massie novel Corridor of Mirrors for which Cartier and Romney co-wrote a screenplay which they sought to have filmed with Romney as lead actress - a project which would take almost seven years to come to fruition. According to Romney, several film studios wished to purchase the screenplay but were not interested in Romney as star. It was also the intention of Cartier and Romney that Cartier would direct the film.

Publicity still for Corridor of Mirrors (1948)

Corridor of Mirrors was eventually shot in 1947 after Cartier and Romney financed a showreel of Romney in scenes planned for the film, which lured top matinee idol Eric Portman onboard the production to act as Romney's leading man. Corridor of Mirrors saw the directorial debut of Terence Young - Cartier being disqualified as director due to trade union objections - and the film was released in 1948 to reasonable critical and commercial success.

=== Later career ===
In November 1949, it was announced that Romney would again star in a film for which she wrote the screenplay, Romney being set to play French tragedienne Rachel in a biopic entitled The Magnificent Upstart to be directed by William Dieterle who had helmed the box office hit Love Letters (1945) adapted from the Chris Massie novel Pity My Simplicity. However, the Rachel biopic was never made, and Romney's acting career after Corridor of Mirrors comprised only four television roles in the 1950s. Two of these were Sunday Night Theatre episodes for the BBC directed by Rudolph Cartier, with Romney playing the leads in the series' versions of That Lady in 1954 and Dark Victory in 1956.

Romney appeared regularly as a television personality: she presented Is This Your Problem? (1955-1957), a BBC panel discussion programme about "delicate" women's issues, such as unexpected pregnancy and unhappiness as housewives. She also wrote a weekly newspaper advice column as a tie-in to the television show. She also hosted a radio show, "Edana Romney's World" and gave talks at women's groups based on her role as a "lovelorn counselor".

== Personal life ==
In 1946, Romney became the second wife of the film producer John Woolf; the couple divorced in 1955. By the 1960s, Romney had relocated to California and was established as a high-profile Beverly Hills hostess living at John Barrymore's one-time mansion "The Hacienda", where her "Twelfth Night" parties were of special note.

Romney died in 2002, aged 83, in Santa Maria, California. There is a collection of her papers archived at the University of Southern California.

== In popular culture ==
In 2022, Romney was portrayed by Sian Clifford in the British-American film See How They Run.

== Selected filmography ==
- East of Piccadilly (1941)
- Alibi (1942)
- Corridor of Mirrors (1948)
