= Eves on Skis =

1963 naturist film by Edward Craven Walker

Evens on Skis
- Theatrical release poster
- Directed by: Edward Craven Walker (as "Michael Keatering")
- Cinematography: Edward Craven Walker
- Music by: Tony Rocco
- Production company: Michael Keatering Productions
- Distributed by: Gala
- Release date: September 1963
- Running time: 63 mins
- Country: United Kingdom
- Language: English

Eves on Skis is a 1963 British naturist documentary film directed by Edward Craven Walker (as Michael Keatering). The commentary was written by Walker and Viktors Ritelis. It featured songs by Tony Rocco.

== Plot ==
A teenage London girl has a naturist holiday, learning to ski and enjoying the sunshine.

== Cast ==
- Rose Alba as Elizabeth (voice)
- Caren as Karen
- Hugo De Vernier as Karl (voice)
- Pat Roberts as Jill (voice)
- Edward Craven Walker as narrator

== Reception ==
It was not a success at the box office.

The Monthly Film Bulletin wrote: "The protracted opening is merely an excuse to introduce a few pop numbers before getting down to the business in hand, which is a variation on the familiar nudist-camp visit. The main difference, apart from the Austrian Alps locale, is that only a small party of naturists is concerned, so that the whole thing appears more private and exclusive than the large camps usually seen on these occasions. Otherwise enthusiasts of the anticipated parade of busts and bottoms will find the film proceeding on familiar lines, granted a novel touch in the spectacle of nude skiers; sports activities are this time confined mainly to snowballing and building an igloo. The film concludes with a threat that next year a new locale may be found for a follow-up."
