= Corridor of Mirrors (film) =

1948 British film by Terence Young

- Original British trade ad
- Directed by: Terence Young
- Written by: Rudolph Cartier; Edana Romney
- Based on: Corridor of Mirrors by Chris Massie
- Produced by: Rudolph Cartier
- Starring: Eric Portman; Barbara Mullen; Hugh Sinclair; Edana Romney
- Cinematography: André Thomas
- Edited by: Douglas Myers
- Music by: Georges Auric
- Production company: Apollo Film
- Distributed by: General Film Distributors
- Release date: 12 April 1948
- Running time: 105 minutes
- Country: United Kingdom
- Language: English

Corridor of Mirrors is a 1948 British Gothic mystery drama horror film directed by Terence Young and starring Eric Portman, Edana Romney and Barbara Mullen. It was written by Rudolph Cartier and Edana Romney based on a novel of the same title by Chris Massie and marked the film debut of both Young and Christopher Lee. An independent production by Apollo Film, it was released by Rank's General Film Distributors.

== Synopsis ==
In London, the wealthy and reclusive artist Paul Mangin is fixated on the past and lives in a luxurious house entirely devoted to evoking the atmosphere of earlier centuries. One night in a nightclub he encounters the beautiful Mifanwy Conway. He becomes transfixed by her, convinced that they had once been lovers in Renaissance Italy, before she betrayed him. She is attracted to his cultivated lifestyle, but becomes alarmed by his obsessive manner and by the ominous warnings of his mysterious housekeeper, Veronica. Mangin cautions her that Veronica is insane, but Mifanwy is unconvinced. She tries to break free from his control by visiting the Welsh countryside with the recently returned explorer Owen Rhys, who wants to marry her.

Mifanwy's escape is cut short when she receives an invitation to a costume ball organised in her honour by Mangin, who has opened his house to the curious London society. That night, dressed as Cesare Borgia, Mangin is arrested for strangling his discarded former lover Caroline Hart. Convicted at trial, he is hanged for murder.

Several years later, Mifanwy receives a series of threatening letters and a telegram asking for a meeting at Madame Tussauds, where she sees the waxwork of the now infamous Mangin, surrounded by other notorious murderers. She is met by Mangin's former butler Mortimer, who sent the telegram. He informs her that Veronica is behind the letters and that her insanity has worsened over time; he plans to put her in an asylum. Veronica enters the wax museum and speaks to Mangin's waxwork, revealing that she killed Caroline out of jealousy, having mistaken her for Mifanwy in the darkness. She then senses that Mifanwy is in the museum and begins threatening her. Mifanwy retorts that Veronica has turned Mangin, the man she supposedly loved, into "an effigy of horror and wax." Dazed, Veronica runs into the street and is hit by a lorry. Mifanwy returns to Wales and the happy young family she has with Owen. He tells her that Veronica confessed to Caroline's murder before her death, and Mangin has been vindicated.

== Cast ==
- Eric Portman as Paul Mangin
- Edana Romney as Mifanwy Conway
- Barbara Mullen as Veronica
- Hugh Sinclair as Owen Rhys
- Bruce Belfrage as Sir David Conway
- Alan Wheatley as Edgar Orsen
- Joan Maude as Caroline Hart
- Leslie Weston as Mortimer
- Christopher Lee as Charles
- Hugh Latimer as Bing
- John Penrose as Brandy
- Lois Maxwell as Lois
- Mavis Villiers as Babs
- Thora Hird as lady in Madame Tussauds
- Valentine Dyall as Counsel for Defence
- Susanne Gibbs as Gwendoline
- Noel Howlett as psychiatrist
- Gordon McLeod as Public Prosecutor

== Production ==
The film was shot at the Studios Radio Cinema in Paris. The film's sets were designed by the art directors Terence Verity and Serge Piménoff.

== Reception ==
The Monthly Film Bulletin wrote: "At times the effects are good, but they are admired for their technical merit alone and not for their part in the story as a whole. The camera is briefly brilliant, but it is cold, detached brilliance. The sets are almost ludicrous in their over-exaggeration. ... Some members of the cast wander in and out of the scenes as if they are not quite sure what has happened to them. Their confusion is not beyond comprehension."

Picturegoer wrote: "Eric Portman must do better than this if he is going to keep his stellar ranking. The picture is said to be inspired by the novel of Chris Massie. I failed to see any inspiration."

Variety wrote: "As the day-dreaming narcissist in love with his so-called renaissance incarnation, Portman moves around like a pan-faced actor in search of a part."

In his 4/5 star review in the Radio Times, David Parkinson wrote: "the more eccentric the action gets (and the more manic Georges Auric's score seems), the more compelling it becomes. In her sole starring venture, Romney (who also co-scripted) isn't quite up to the task. But Portman is magnificently unhinged and Terence Verity's art direction is outstanding."
