= Dorinda Stevens =

British actress (1932–2012)

- Dorinda Stevens in Danger Man in 1964
- Born: Doreen May Stevens; 16 August 1932; Southampton, Hampshire, England
- Died: 25 October 2012 (aged 80); Winchester, Hampshire, England
- Occupation: Actress
- Years active: 1952 – 1965
- Spouse: Peter Wyngarde (m. 1951; div. 1956)

Dorinda Stevens (16 August 1932 – 25 October 2012) was a British television and film actress of the 1950s and 1960s.

== Biography ==
Stevens was born Doreen May Stevens in Southampton, the daughter of Henry C. Stevens and Winifred (née Lucas). During World War II, at age 10, she was evacuated to Houghton in Hampshire where she appeared in amateur dramatics to entertain the troops. She studied elocution, and she taught this subject by age 13. She joined the Southampton Repertory Company, where she was spotted for her good looks, and she was booked to appear in London aged 17.

Stevens was briefly married to the actor Peter Wyngarde in the early 1950s and later married Canadian cinematographer William Michael Boultbee (1933–2005) in Nairobi in 1957 while filming for African Patrol.

Stevens retired from acting in 1965. Reviewing her final theatrical film Night Train to Paris (1964), New York Times critic Howard Thompson wrote that "the most attractive thing about the whole picture is a nifty blonde named Dorinda Stevens. The woman can act, too, which is more than can be said for most of the others."

Stevens died aged 80 in 2012 in Winchester in Hampshire as a result of complications of a stroke, and she was cremated at Bournemouth Crematorium.

== Filmography ==
Year	Title	Role	Notes
1952	Lady in the Fog	Girl at film studio	uncredited
1952	It Started in Paradise	Flo, 1st barmaid	uncredited
1954	The Golden Link	Norma Sheridan	
1955	Confession	Blonde	U.S. title: The Deadliest Sin
1955	Handcuffs, London (Note: Handcuffs, London was a feature-length compilation of episodes from TV's Fabian of the Yard (televised in the U.S. as Patrol Car), including "The King's Hat".)	Lady Edith Garven	
1957	A King in New York	(Unconfirmed role)	uncredited
1957	Not Wanted on Voyage	Pat	
1958	Man with a Gun	Club Receptionist	
1959	Jack the Ripper	Margaret	
1959	Operation Bullshine	A.T.S. Girl	
1959	Horrors of the Black Museum	Pat Dunlap	
1959	The Shakedown	Grace	
1960	Carry On Constable	Young woman	
1960	The Gentle Trap	Mary	
1960	Make Mine Mink	Jean	uncredited
1961	His and Hers	Dora	
1961	Raising the Wind	Doris	
1961	Night Without Pity	Girlfriend	
1962	Hair of the Dog	Ann Tickle	
1963	Carry on Jack	Girl at Dirty Dick's	uncredited
1963	The Undesirable Neighbour	Mary Bennet	part of The Scales of Justice series of featurettes
1964	The Verdict (Note: The Verdict was released theatrically in the UK as a second feature, and it later was televised in the U.S. as an episode of The Edgar Wallace Mystery Theater.)	Molly	
1964	Night Train to Paris	Olive Davies	

== Selected television appearances ==
Year	Programme	Episode	Role
1953	Sunday Night Theatre	"Once in a Lifetime"	Coat-check girl
1955	Fabian of the Yard	"The King's Hat"	Lady Edith Garven
1955	Confidentially		Receptionist
1956	Sixpenny Corner		Miss Golightly
1959	Dial 999 (TV series)	"50,000 Hands" "Old Soldiers Sometimes Die"	Madge Bingham Helen
1958–59	African Patrol	"Man and Beast" "Missing Doctor" "The Baboon Laughed"	Lila Ruth; Helen Gibson
1959	Crime Sheet	"The Superintendent Hedges a Bet"	Carol Betterton
1960	International Detective	"The Barnaby Case"	Glory
1959–60	Interpol Calling	"In the Swim" "Air Switch"	Millicent Helen
1961	The Pursuers	"Inside Job"	Belle
1962	The Cheaters	"The Safe Way"	Girl
1959–1962	No Hiding Place	"Thirty Seconds From Now" "Process of Elimination" "Murder with Witnesses"	Carol Betty; Lola la Salle
1962	The Saint	"The Careful Terrorist"	Verna
1963	The Scales of Justice	"The Undesirable Neighbour"	Mary Bennet
1964	The Edgar Wallace Mystery Theatre	"The Verdict"	Molly
1964	The Avengers	"Concerto"	Darleen
1964	Hugh and I	"Emergency Ward"	
1965	Danger Man	"Such Men Are Dangerous"	Miss Jackson
