= Sally Nesbitt =

English actress (born 1938)

- Born: Sally Hunt; October 1, 1938 (age 87); Darjeeling, British India
- Occupation: Actress
- Spouse(s): Robert Nisbet (m. 1958); Peter Crouch; Richard Nigel Spink (m. 2000)

Sally Nesbitt (born 1 October 1938) is an English actress.

== Life ==
Nesbitt was born in Darjeeling, British India in 1938. She is the daughter of John Hunt, Baron Hunt, British Army officer who is best known as the leader of the successful 1953 British expedition to Mount Everest. She studied at Nottingham University.

Nesbitt has worked with the Royal Shakespeare Company for some time, and appeared in several films and television productions.

== Selected filmography ==
=== Film ===
Year	Title	Role	Notes
1964	The Gorgon	Nurse	uncredited
1969	The Sicilian Clan	Mrs. Evans	
1978	The Class of Miss MacMichael	Mrs. Brady	
1980	Hopscotch	Telephone Operator	
1991	King Ralph	Onlooker	

=== Television ===
Year	Title	Role	Notes
1963	Crane	Jacqueline	Episode: "The Price of Friendship"
1963	Emergency Ward 10	Brenda Millett	Episode #604
1965	The Scales of Justice	Pat Turner	Episode: "The Material Witness"
1967	The Avengers	Ola Monsey Chamberlain	Episode: "The Joker"
1967	The White Rabbit	Suni Sandoe	2 Episodes
1968	The Expert	Jane Carter	6 Episodes
1969	The Avengers	Helen	Episode: "Bizarre"
1971	The Misfit	Casualty nurse	Episode: "On the National Health"
1972	New Scotland Yard	Doctor Somers	Episode: "Prove It"
1973	Justice	Connie Oliphant	Episode: "Divorce"
1973	Armchair 30	Joan Fenton	Episode: "Simon Fenton's Story"
1975	Rooms	Claire	2 Episodes
1995	Crown Prosecutor	Magistrate	6 Episodes
1996	EastEnders	Chief Magistrate	Episode #1324
