= Travelling Light (1959 film) =

1960 naturist film by Edward Craven Walker

- Theatrical release poster
- Directed by: Edward Craven Walker (as "Michael Keatering")
- Written by: Victor Hewitt
- Cinematography: Edward Craven Walker
- Production company: E.C. Walker Productions
- Distributed by: Gala
- Release date: March 1960
- Running time: 52 mins
- Country: United Kingdom
- Language: English

Travelling Light (also known as Ondines sans voiles) is a 1959 British naturist pseudo-documentary directed by Edward Craven Walker (as Michael Keatering). It was written by Victor Hewitt.

It premiered in London's West End.

The film stars Elizabeth Walker, who was routinely described as Naturism's Ambassador in 1950s Britain.

== Plot ==
Elizabeth, while sunbathing at Studland Bay gets invited to join some naturists on a trip to the famous nudist colony at Villata in Corsica. There, they meet Yannick, who performs a unique “underwater ballet” to Rimsky-Korsakov's Song of India. At the end of her holiday, Elizabeth returns home refreshed and with a newfound enthusiasm for naturism.

== Cast ==
- Elizabeth Walker
- Yannick Philouze as underwater swimmer

== Reception ==
The Monthly Film Bulletin wrote: "Travelling Light covers exactly the same ground as its many predecessors and equals, if not surpasses, them in the insipidity of its presentation and the self-conscious coyness of its commentary. Despite the fact that volleyball, swimming and sunbathing are all pleasurable activities, they tend to become excruciatingly boring when dealt with at this length. The most attractive sequence is the underwater ballet featuring Yannick, "the fabulous sub-aqua star", whose nubile contortions bring with them a whiff of eroticism which is elsewhere studiously avoided. The natural scenery is also very colourful."
