= Hair of the Dog (film) =

1962 British film by Terry Bishop

- Directed by: Terry Bishop
- Written by: Tony Hawes; John O'Gorman
- Produced by: Jack Parsons
- Starring: Reginald Beckwith; Dorinda Stevens; John Le Mesurier
- Cinematography: Ken Hodges
- Edited by: Peter Bezencenet
- Music by: David Lee
- Production company: Parroch Films
- Distributed by: J. Arthur Rank Film Distributors (U.K.)
- Release date: January 1962 (U.K.)
- Running time: 66 minutes
- Country: United Kingdom
- Language: English

Hair of the Dog is a 1962 British second feature comedy film directed by Terry Bishop and starring Reginald Beckwith, Dorinda Stevens and John Le Mesurier. It was written by Tony Hawes and John O'Gorman.

== Preservation status ==
The British Film Institute National Archive holds a collection of stills but no film or video materials.

== Plot ==
Fred Tickle is commissionaire at a razor blade factory, and grows a beard after developing a shaving rash, but his new appearance doesn't go down well with management.

== Cast ==
- Reginald Beckwith as Fred Tickle
- Dorinda Stevens as Ann Tickle
- John Le Mesurier as Sir Mortimer Gallant
- Brian Oulton as Gregory Willett
- Alison Bayley as Violet Tickle
- Harold Goodwin as Percy
- Barbara Windsor as Elsie Grumble
- Stanley Morgan as Jim Lester
- Stanley Unwin as vicar
- Keith Smith as interviewer
- Tony Hawes as Mr Rembrandt
- Edward Malin as Sidney
- Raymond Rollett as Arthur
- Cardew Robinson as doctor

== Critical reception ==
Monthly Film Bulletin said "The appealing comedy idea suggests an Ealing ancestry. But the script and direction make heavy and obvious fun of it; while the resources of the slender theme are tediously strained by the bumping up of Fred's beard into an international issue. The less bizarre but more fruitful vein of humour, as the little man expands in stature through the impressive effect of his face fungus, is too carelessly treated to register. The acting, though serviceable, is as predictable as the treatment, except for John Le Mesurier's excellent portrayal of the business tycoon, Sir Mortimer. Stars are expendable, but what price British comedies if Le Mesurier should ever desert from the ranks?"

Kine Weekly wrote: "The picture seizes on a really bright theme and exploits its humour slickly. Reginald Beckwith contributes a skilfully graduated portrayal as Fred, Alison Bayley is the typical domineering stage wife as Violet, and Dorinda Stevens and Stanley Morgan make the most of a conventional heart interest as Ann and Jim. The semi-detached villa, factory and local pub settings thoroughly convince, while the dialogue fits the widely assorted characters perfectly. "
