= John Penrose (actor) =

British actor (1914–1983)

- 1939 Spotlight photo by Frank Buckingham
- Born: 5 April 1914; Southsea, Portsmouth, Hampshire, England
- Died: 22 May 1983 (aged 69); London, England
- Occupation: Actor

Derek John Penrose (5 May 1914 – 22 May 1983) was a British actor. After graduating from RADA in 1936, he made his London stage debut the following year in Old Music at the St. James' Theatre.

His best-known role was in the 1949 film Kind Hearts and Coronets, where he played Lionel, Sibella's dull husband whom Louis was accused of murdering.

== Filmography ==
Year	Title	Role	Notes
1939	The Spy in Black	Newlywed at Kiel Hotel	Uncredited
1939	The Lion Has Wings	Minor Role	
1941	Freedom Radio	Otto	
1943	The Adventures of Tartu	Lt. Krantz at the Skoda Factory	
1947	They Made Me a Fugitive	Shawney	
1948	Corridor of Mirrors	Brandy	
1948	The Idol of Paris	George Cremer Jr.	
1949	Kind Hearts and Coronets	Lionel	
1949	The Adventures of PC 49	Barney	
1950	Traveller's Joy	1st Swedish Reporter	Uncredited
1951	Hell Is Sold Out	Repatriation Official	
1952	Secret People	Bill	
1952	Hot Ice	Freddie Usher	
1953	Mantrap	Du Vancet	
1953	Street of Shadows	Gerald Gale	
1953	Counterspy	Paulson	
1954	The Million Pound Note	Stockbroker	Uncredited
1955	Murder Anonymous	Langster	Short, (final film role)
