= Bridget Armstrong =

New Zealand actress (born 1937)

Bridget Armstrong (born 1937, Dunedin) is a New Zealand actress. She was educated at St Patrick's Dominican College, Teschemakers, Oamaru. She appeared on stage, film and TV several times, including The Lost Tribe (The Goodies); as Nurse Rosemary Layton, in the Edgar Wallace Mysteries ' episode, We Shall See; and, as Anna Bosworth, and Janet Davis, respectively, in The Scales of Justice episodes, 'The Undesirable Neighbour' and 'Infamous Conduct'. She also played Dian De Momerie in the BBC adaptation of Murder Must Advertise, by Dorothy L. Sayers.

She was married to New Zealand writer Maurice Shadbolt from 1978 until his death in 2004. Supporting role in 1976 film The Incredible Sarah, a biography of stage actress Sarah Bernhardt directed by Richard Fleischer, shot by Christopher Challis, and starring Glenda Jackson and Daniel Massey.
