= School for Sex =

1969 British film by Pete Walker

- Theatrical release poster
- Directed by: Pete Walker
- Written by: Pete Walker
- Produced by: Pete Walker
- Starring: Derek Aylward; Rose Alba; Hugh Latimer; Nosher Powell; Françoise Pascal
- Cinematography: Reg Phillips
- Edited by: John Black
- Music by: Harry South
- Production company: Pete Walker-Border
- Distributed by: Miracle
- Release date: 8 April 1969
- Running time: 80 minutes
- Country: United Kingdom
- Language: English
- Box office: £2.5 million (in US)

School for Sex is a 1969 British sex comedy film directed, produced and written by Pete Walker. It has been described as the first British sexploitation film.

== Cast ==
- Derek Aylward as Giles Wingate
- Rose Alba as Duchess of Burwash
- Bob Andrews as Sgt. Braithwaite
- Vic Wise as Horace Clapp
- Hugh Latimer as Berridge
- Nosher Powell as Hector
- Amber Dean Smith as Beth Villiers
- Françoise Pascal as Sally Reagan
- Cathy Howard as Sue Randall
- Sylvia Barlow as Judy Arkwright
- Sandra Gleeson as Jenny
- Maria Frost as Polly
- Cindy Neal as Marianne
- Gilly Grant as striptease artist
- Jackie Berdet as Ingeborg
- Nicole Austen as Tania
- Edgar K. Bruce as Fred
- Robert Dorning as Civil Sergeant
- Julie May as Ethel
- Alec Bregonzi as Harry
- Wilfred Babbage as Judge
- Dennis Castle as Colonel Roberts

== Plot ==
Lord Wingate, on probation after being acquitted on fraud charges, needs money, so he starts a school to train young women in the arts of gold-digging in exchange for a cut of the take. The alcoholic widow the Duchess of Burwash is a teacher, and an aged Cockney is the fitness instructor. The first group of pupils are on probation from Holloway Prison, but rich parents soon begin to enroll their daughters under the impression the school is a finishing school. Eventually, Lord Wingate is found guilty on new charges, but the judge decides to try the business idea himself.

== Production ==
The film was shot on location in Kent, Sussex and London, England.

The original film includes topless scenes and glimpses of full nudity. Alternative nude versions of some scenes were shot for release in Japan.

== Reception ==
=== Box office ===
In France School for Sex had 72,000 admissions in its opening week. In the United States, it ran on Broadway for two years.

=== Critical reception ===
Monthly Film Bulletin said "As its title indicates, Peter Walker's latest piece of titillatory entertainment is largely a peg on which to hang an assortment of bikinis and diminutive undergarments. But after a relatively lively start, this nonsensical and determinedly risqué farce plods humourlessly on its way with leaden dialogue, wooden acting and rough sound recording."

Walker himself regretted saving money by writing the script himself and called it his worst film, referring to it in 2005 as a "terrible film".
