= The Scales of Justice =

British short drama film series (1962–1967)

- Genre: Drama
- Presented by: Edgar Lustgarten
- Composer: Johnny Douglas
- Country of origin: United Kingdom
- Original language: English
- No. of episodes: 13

Production
- Producer: Jack Greenwood
- Running time: 30 Minutes
- Production company: Merton Park Studios

Original release
- Release: 1962 – 1967

The Scales of Justice was a series of 13 British cinema featurettes produced from 1962 to 1967 for Anglo-Amalgamated at Merton Park Studios in London. The first nine episodes were made in black and white, and the last four in colour. The final episode, Payment in Kind, was Merton Park's final production.

Episodes were based on criminal cases, and each film was introduced by crime writer Edgar Lustgarten. The series derives its title from the symbolic scales held by the statue of Justice, situated above the dome of London's Central Criminal Court, The Old Bailey. In the opening narration, she is described as having "in her right hand, the Sword of Power and Retribution, and in her left – The Scales of Justice". The opening scenes of the initial six episodes were narrated by Michael Hordern.

The end version of the theme music for the series (by Johnny Douglas) was performed by The Tornados. It was re-recorded and released as the B side of their single "The Ice Cream Man".

The Scales of Justice became widely known in the UK when it was broadcast as a TV series in various ITV regions during the 1970s. In July 2017, the series aired on the television channel Talking Pictures TV.

In October 2012, Network released the complete series as a two-disc DVD set.

== Episode guide ==
| Title | Date | Cast | Director | Format | Story |
|---|---|---|---|---|---|
| 1. "The Guilty Party" | 1962 | Zena Marshall, Jack Gwillim, Derek Francis, Wensley Pithey, Anthony Jacobs, Jean Lodge, Basil Henson, Carleton Hobbs, Kenneth Thornett | Lionel Harris | B&W | Edward Sinclair and his wife Thelma live surrounded by wealth and luxury, but Sinclair is heavily in debt. |
| 2. "A Woman's Privilege" | 1962 | Bernard Archard, Ann Lynn, Patrick Wymark, Ernest Clark, Noel Hood, Gerald Cross, Pamela Greer, | Anthony Bushell | B&W | On a cruise to cheer herself up after a broken romance, Shirley Fawsett meets Joe Ashton. The result is a court case where he sues her for breach of promise. |
| 3. "Moment of Decision" | 1962 | Ray Barrett, Pat Healy, Viola Keats, Tim Hudson, Marjie Lawrence, Norman Claridge, Lisa Madron, Mike Sarne, Michael Aspel | John Knight | B&W | A nursemaid loses the baby in her charge. |
| 4. "Position of Trust" | 1963 | Derrick Sherwin, Imogen Hassall, Edward Atienza, Peter Barkworth, Geoffrey Chater, Cyril Luckham, Robert Lankesheer | Lionel Harris | B&W | The extroverted son of a powerful industrialist meets a pretty French girl named Yvonne at a Bohemian night spot, becoming infatuated, gradually growing their relationship resulting in an illicit weekend away from his fiancée. The weekend begins promisingly, but after their first night together, a man barges into their Brighton hotel bedroom, claiming to be a private detective acting for Yvonne's husband. |
| 5. "The Undesirable Neighbour" | 1963 | Vanda Godsell, Bridget Armstrong, Anthony Newlands, Ronald Hatton, Garfield Morgan, Dorinda Stevens | Gordon Hales | B&W | When a young married couple move into a new home, the wife is popular with the local men, which starts gossip. |
| 6. "The Invisible Asset" | 1963 | Kenneth J. Warren, Ronald Leigh-Hunt, Annette Carell, Philip Latham, Gabriella Licudi, John Wentworth, Desmond Roberts, Kenneth Benda, Peter Bathurst, Stanley Morgan | Norman Harrison | B&W | In a city restaurant, the owner blackmails influential customers by using a hidden microphone on a special table. |
| 7. "Personal and Confidential" | 1965 | Robert Cartland, Harry Littlewood, Howard Lang, Geoffrey Toone, Jeffrey Segal, Windsor Davies, Patrick Carter, Don McKillop | Geoffrey Nethercott | B&W | Found in the briefcase of the man in Room 755, who fell, or was pushed, from a seventh storey window is a red file, marked "Top Secret". |
| 8. "The Hidden Face" | 1965 | Christine Finn, Richard Butler, Alex Macintosh, Robert James, Gretchen Franklin, Vernon Dobtcheff, Peter Stephens, David Garth | Patrick Dromgoole | B&W | Jane Penshurst writes a book attacking Ronald Milson MP. When Milsom shoots himself, his son William seeks revenge. |
| 9. "The Material Witness" | 1965 | Noel Trevarthen, Reginald Marsh, Sally Nesbitt, Harry Locke, Hector Ross, Sheila Manahan, John Horsley | Geoffrey Nethercott | B&W | A young man is the personal assistant to a company executive who has little time for him. |
| 10. "Company of Fools" | 1966 | Barrie Ingham, Jacqueline Jones, Maurice Kaufmann, Garfield Morgan | Peter Duffell | Colour | Five strangers from varied walks of life investigate the life of a man who has caused them all serious financial losses, and they seek to exact their own private revenge. |
| 11. "The Haunted Man" | 1966 | Keith Barron, James Ellis, Alexandra Bastedo, Isobel Black, Tenniel Evans, Dallas Cavell | Stanley Willis | Colour | Actor Bill Kenton, injured trying to prevent a raid on a shop, returns to his career, to find that he cannot remember his lines. Forced to leave the theatre, he becomes a man obsessed with finding the thieves. |
| 12. "Infamous Conduct" | 1966 | Dermot Walsh, Bridget Armstrong, Ewen Solon, Richard Warner, Terry Wale | Richard Martin | Colour | Struck off the medical register, surgeon Anthony Searle meets Dixon, a bank robber on the run, and Dixon wants a "face job". |
| 13. "Payment in Kind" | 1967 | Justine Lord, Maxine Audley, Brian Haines, Derrick Sherwin, Gwen Cherrell, Henry McGee, Peter Bathurst | Peter Duffell | Colour | The dedicated wife of a struggling businessman falls behind on the hire purchase payments, and the debt collector suggests "payment in kind". |
