= Playboy lifestyle =

Wealthy man's life of pleasure

A playboy lifestyle is the lifestyle of a wealthy man with ample time for leisure, who enjoys the luxuries and physical pleasures of the world, especially the sexual company of women. Near-synonymous terms include a bon vivant or man about town. The term "playboy" was popular in the early to mid-20th century and is sometimes used to describe a conspicuous womanizer.

== Development ==
"The Original Playboys relied upon a perfect storm of pleasurable circumstances: The world was at peace; airplanes began flying internationally; their parents were members of the 1920s café society and raised progressive, well-mannered, fashion-forward children; they possessed unparalleled wealth, there was no Internet – as a result, they will forever remain an inimitable breed of elite, professional pleasure seekers, the likes of which the world will never see again."

Initially the term was used in the eighteenth century for boys who performed in the theatre, and later it appears in the 1888 Oxford Dictionary to characterize a person with money who is out to enjoy himself. By the end of the nineteenth century it also implied the connotations of "gambler" and "musician". By 1907, in J. M. Synge's comedy The Playboy of the Western World, the term had acquired the notion of a womanizer. According to Shawn Levy, the term reached its full meaning in the interwar years and early post WWII years. Postwar intercontinental travel allowed playboys to meet at international nightclubs and famous "playgrounds" such as the Riviera or Palm Beach where they were trailed by paparazzi who supplied the tabloids with material to be fed to an eager audience. Their sexual conquests were rich, beautiful, and famous. In 1953, Hugh Hefner caught the wave and created Playboy magazine.

== Famous playboys ==
Porfirio Rubirosa, who died in a car crash in 1965, is an example of someone who embodied the playboy lifestyle. The diplomat claimed to have no time to work, being busy spending time with women, getting married briefly and in sequence to the two richest women in the world, drinking and gambling with his friends, playing polo, racing cars, and flying his airplane from party to party. He was linked to other famous playboys of the time, including Aly Khan; Jorge Guinle; Francisco "Baby" Pignatari; and Gunther Sachs, his acolyte, who termed himself a homo ludens.

Other people who adopted the playboy lifestyle included Alfonso de Portago, Barry Sheene, Hugh Hefner, Derek Jeter, Dan Bilzerian, Julio Iglesias, George Best, Adam Clayton, Imran Khan, Michael Douglas, James Hunt, Howard Hughes, Averell Harriman, Errol Flynn, Gianni Agnelli, Silvio Berlusconi, John F. Kennedy, Alessandro "Dado" Ruspoli, Carlos de Beistegui, Count Theodore Zichy, David Frost, Bernard Cornfeld, Wilt Chamberlain, George Clooney, Maurizio Zanfanti, Mario Conde, Fabrizio Corona, and Richard Harris.

Fictional playboys include James Bond from the James Bond franchise, Patrick Melrose from Patrick Melrose, Bruce Wayne from the DC Comics Batman franchise, Tony Stark from Marvel Entertainment, Jack Donaghy from 30 Rock, and Charlie Harper from Two and a Half Men.

== See also ==
- Café society
- Casanova
- Don Juanism
- Hedonism
- Jet set
- Libertine
- Luxury
- Rake
- Socialite
