= Doomsday at Eleven =

1962 British film by Theodore Zichy

- Theatrical release poster
- Directed by: Theodore Zichy
- Screenplay by: Paul Tabori
- Produced by: Jack Parsons
- Starring: Carl Jaffe; Alan Haywood; Stanley Morgan
- Cinematography: Ken Hodges
- Edited by: Robert Winter
- Production company: Parroch Films
- Release date: 24 April 1962
- Running time: 59 minutes
- Country: United Kingdom
- Language: English

Doomsday at Eleven (also known as Doomsday at 11) is a 1962 British film directed by Theodore Zichy and starring Carl Jaffe, Alan Haywood and Stanley Morgan. The screenplay was by Paul Tabori. The film was produced by Jack Parsons.

== Plot ==
WIlson, jailed for 10 years for betraying official secrets, wants revenge against the judge who put him away. He sends a package containing a time-bomb to the maternity hospital where the judge's wife, Angela, is expecting a baby. The bomb is discovered and the hospital evacuated, but due to their condition Angela and another patient cannot be moved. A bomb disposal team is called but are involved in an accident on the way. Wylie, the commanding officer, although injured, manages to reach the hospital and enlists the help of Peter Godwin, a policeman visiting his wife, and Stefan, a porter. They disarm the bomb, but its highly dangerous bottle of nitroglycerin remains, with its stopper jammed. Peter and Stefan take the bottle through a tunnel for its urgent disposal at sea, and on the way meet a tramp, Jeremiah, who suggests they cut through the glass with Stefan's diamond ring, which they successfully do.

== Cast ==
- Carl Jaffe as Stefan
- Alan Haywood as Peter Godwin
- Stanley Morgan as Wylie
- Derrick De Marney as Alderbrook
- Jennifer Wright as Angela
- Delia Corrie as Eve
- Alan Edwards as Wilson
- Geoffrey Dunn as Jeremiah
- Eric Elliott as Dr. Hooper
- John Harvey as assistant commissioner
- Donald Tandy as Sgt. Hawkes
- Douglas Robinson as warder
- Joe Ritchie as lorry driver
- Grenville Eves as 1st Inspector
- Basil Beale as 2nd Inspector
- Robin Ford as attendant
- Frank Thornton as BBC announcer

== Production ==
The film was partially funded by the National Film Finance Corporation. It was shot at Shepperton Studios.

== Critical reception ==
The Monthly Film Bulletin wrote: "Grotesque melodrama, whose high-spot is the climactic crosscutting (possibly symbolic) between Angela having a caesarean operation, and the three men carefully opening the explosive bottle with a diamond ring. One or two scenes are mildly effective – notably the attack from the rooftops and the eerie descent into the tube tunnel – but the whole thing is swamped by the grossly exaggerated heroics and incredibly foolish dialogue."
