= Hugh Latimer (actor) =

English actor (1913–2006)

- 1949 still
- Born: 12 May 1913; Haslemere, England
- Died: 12 June 2006 (aged 93); London, England
- Occupations: Actor & Toy maker

Hugh Alexander Forbes Latimer (12 May 1913 – 12 June 2006) was an English actor and toy maker.

He was educated at Oundle and Caius College, Cambridge, where he joined Footlights. He briefly attended the Central School of Speech and Drama, before appearing in White Cargo at the Brixton Theatre in 1936. Noted for his skill in light comedy, Latimer made his West End debut in Pride and Prejudice in 1937.

After being called up in 1940, he was commissioned to the 34th Light AA Regiment and saw active service in the Middle East and India between 1941 and 1945.

He was married to Sheila Gairns. The couple had two daughters.

== Filmography ==
Year	Title	Role	Notes
1948	Corridor of Mirrors	Bing	
1949	The Adventures of PC 49	P.C. Archibald Berkeley-Willoughby	
1950	Someone at the Door	Bill Reid	
1952	Ghost Ship	Peter	
1953	Counterspy	Inspector Barlow	
1954	Stryker of the Yard		
1954	The Million Pound Note	Bumbles Hotel Receptionist	Uncredited
1955	Tim Driscoll's Donkey	Mr. Marshall	
1955	Strange Experiences	Man	2 episodes
1956	The Narrowing Circle	Charles Pears	
1956	The Last Man to Hang?	The Story: Mark	
1957	Rogue's Yarn	Sergeant Adams	
1958	The Strange World of Planet X	Jimmy Murray	
1958	Up the Creek	Lt Commander	
1958	Sink the Bismarck!	Commander - War Room	Uncredited
1960	The Gentle Trap	Vic Carter	
1963	Girl in the Headlines	Man in Club	
1964	Night Train to Paris	Jules Lemoine	
1966	Ambush at Devil's Gap	Laker	
1969	School for Sex	Berridge	
1970	Jane Eyre	Colonel Dent	
1973	John Keats: His Life and Death	Second Critic	
