= Baron (photographer) =

English photographer (1906–1956)

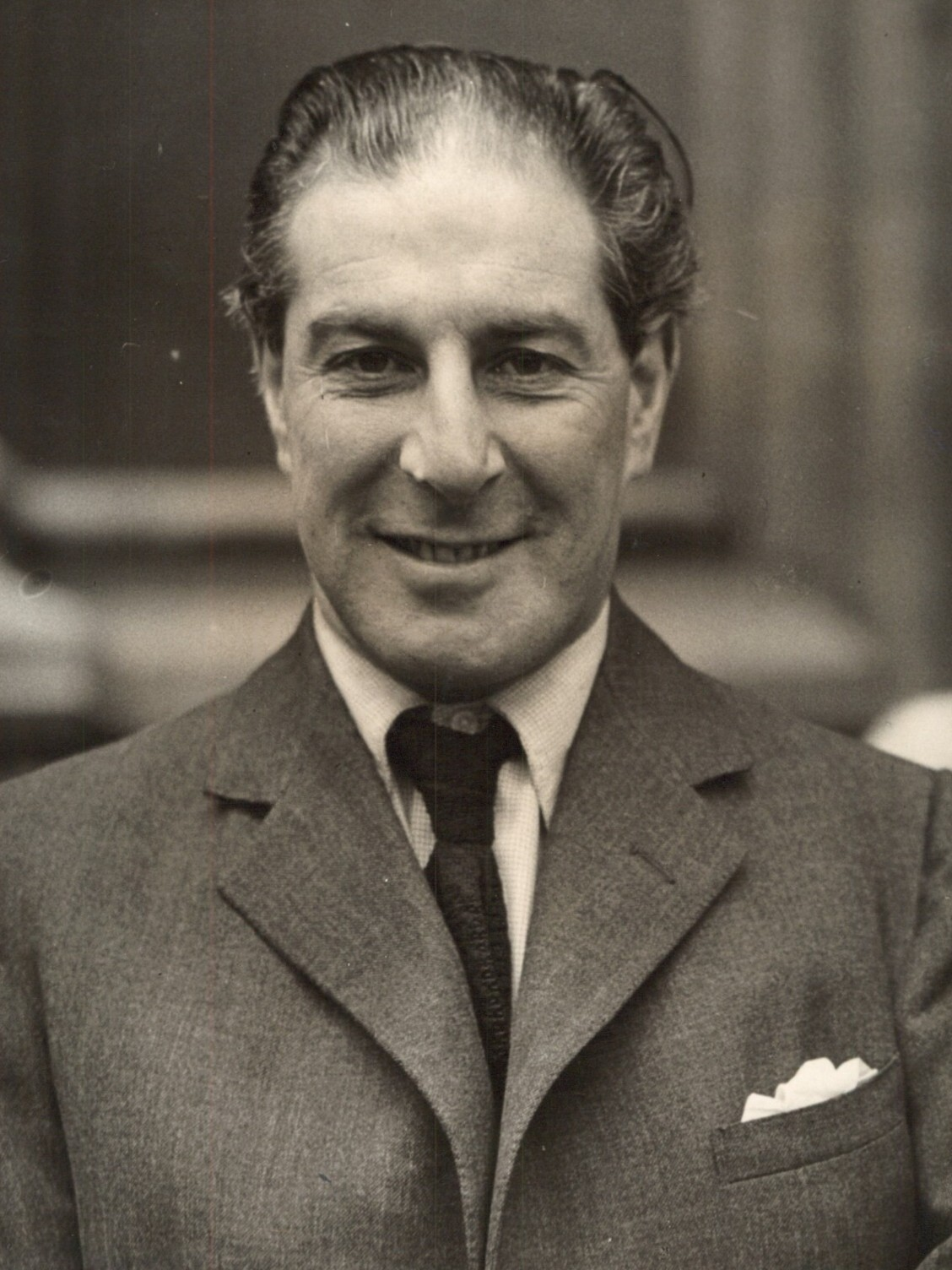
- Nahum in 1953
- Born: Baron Stirling Henry di Victor Nahum; 29 November 1906; Prestwich, Greater Manchester, England
- Died: 5 September 1956 (aged 49)
- Occupation: Photographer

Baron Stirling Henry di Victor Nahum (Note: Also spelled Baron Stirling Henry Di Victor Nahum) (29 November 1906 – 5 September 1956), known professionally as Baron, was a society and court photographer in the United Kingdom.

He was born in Prestwich, Greater Manchester, England, of Italian Jewish heritage. He was the twin brother of Jack Nahum, who later became a Queen's Counsel. Having embarked on a career as a photographer, in his thirties he began to find prominence for his pictures of the ballet, and was often found at the Sadler's Wells ballet company. After the war he concentrated on society and celebrity portraits.

A friend of Prince Philip, he was appointed a Court Photographer to the British Royal Family, and took the official photographs for many occasions such as the wedding of Philip to Princess Elizabeth in 1947, the christenings of their children Charles and Anne and other occasions. Prince Philip put forward his name in 1953 to take the official photographs of the Coronation of Queen Elizabeth II, but the Queen Mother preferred Cecil Beaton.

The following year, he founded Baron Studios on Park Lane in Mayfair, taking commissioned portraits by photographers including Theodore Zichy and Rex Coleman, mainly of leading businessmen. One notable sitter was Marilyn Monroe, whom Nahum photographed in 1954, in an outdoor shoot in California. During the first year in his studio, Antony Armstrong-Jones, was one of his assistants.

Two years after founding his new venture, Nahum died at the age of 49. Baron Studios continued in business until 1974. The Studio's photograph collection was donated to the National Portrait Gallery in 1999.

Nahum appears as a character in the Netflix production The Crown in Season 1, Episode 6, played by Julius D'Silva.
