= The Adventures of PC 49 =

1949 British film by Godfrey Grayson

- Directed by: Godfrey Grayson
- Written by: Vernon Harris (radio series); Alan Stranks
- Produced by: Anthony Hinds
- Starring: Hugh Latimer; John Penrose; Annette D. Simmonds
- Cinematography: Cedric Williams
- Edited by: Clifford Turner
- Music by: Frank Spencer
- Production company: Hammer Films
- Distributed by: Exclusive Films
- Release date: 23 July 1949
- Running time: 67 minutes
- Country: United Kingdom
- Language: English

The Adventures of PC 49 (also known as The Case of the Guardian Angel) is a 1949 British second feature ('B') crime film directed by Godfrey Grayson, starring Hugh Latimer, John Penrose and Annette D. Simmonds. It was written by Vernon Harris and Alan Stranks based on the popular BBC radio series by Stranks. It was followed by a sequel, A Case for PC 49, in 1951.

There were six children's annuals containing stories of PC 49 published in England, as well as an annual reprinting of his strips in the Eagle comic.

== Plot ==
P.C. 49 – Police Constable Archibald Berkeley-Willoughby – infiltrates a gang specializing in stealing loads of whisky from lorries. He adopts the alias Vince Kelly, but one of the gang members (Skinny Ellis) recognizes him as a cop. With his girlfriend Joan's help, he brings the ringleader Ma Brady and her henchmen to justice.

== Cast ==
- Hugh Latimer as P.C. Archibald Berkeley-Willoughby
- John Penrose as Barney
- Annette D. Simmonds as Carrots
- Pat Nye as Ma Brady
- Patricia Cutts as Joan Carr
- Michael Ripper as Fingers
- Martin Benson as Skinny Ellis
- Arthur Lovegrove as Bill
- Arthur Brander as Inspector Wilson
- Eric Phillips as Sergeant Wright
- Billy Thatcher as Ted Burton
- Jim O'Brady as lorry driver

== Reception ==
Kine Weekly wrote: "Its sense of humour is keen and its romantic asides lively. There is no danger of it being taken too seriously. Jolly and exciting crime fiction, it is particularly well-equipped to meet general second-feature needs. But we're blowed if we know why the Censor has given it an 'A' certificate."

Picturegoer wrote: "His first excursion into films, though a little too conventional in treatment, follows a much-enjoyed, much-traced pattern."

Picture Show wrote: "Based on the B.B.C. series, this is a hearty, fast-moving melodrama in which the University graduate policeman rounds up a gang of warehouse robbers. Lively direction, vigorous acting."

In British Sound Films: The Studio Years 1928–1959 David Quinlan rated the film as "average", writing: "Unconventional radio character somewhat straitjacketed in conventional plot."
