= Maurizio Zanfanti =

Italian media personality (1955–2018)

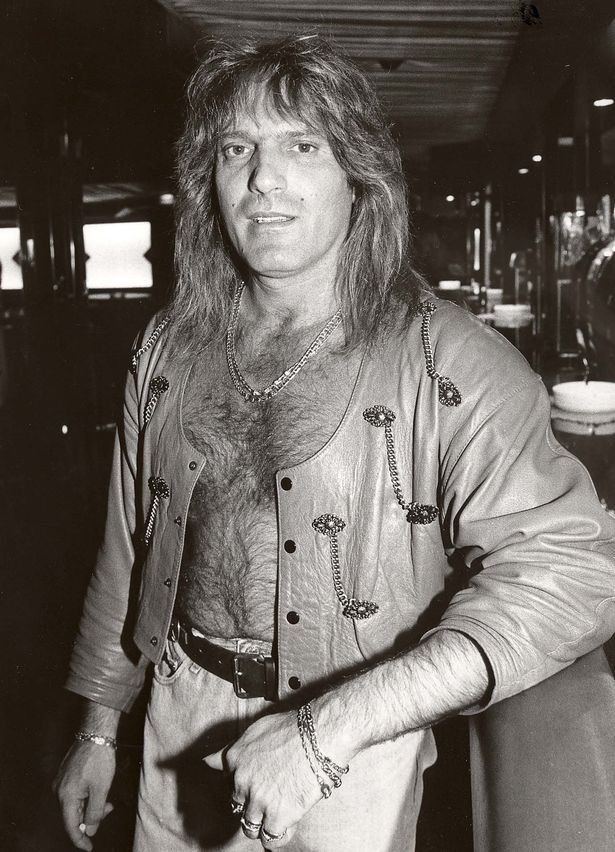
Maurizio Zanfanti in 1975

Maurizio "Zanza" Zanfanti (Rimini, 20 October 1955 – Rimini, 26 September 2018) was an Italian entrepreneur, considered a playboy and media personality of European fame.

== Life ==
Zanfanti operated mainly in Rimini and became internationally known for his conquests on the Romagna Riviera: he said he had more than 6,000 women and had done more for the Italian Riviera than "100 tourist agencies". He was defined as "the last playboy" or "the king of playboys" by the main newspapers of European nations. He died of a myocardial infarction aged 62, during sexual intercourse with a woman 40 years his junior in the back of a car.

The notoriety of Maurizio Zanfanti, who spoke English and Swedish and was born in a poor peasant family, began at the age of 17, after he started working, first as tout bringing in German and Scandinavian tourists and then "artistic director" in a well-known nightclub in Rimini called the Blow Up. His looks allowed him to easily bond with tourists in Romagna. Zanfanti ended up on the pages of the German newspaper Bild, which described him as the "Romeo of Rimini" and defined his qualities as a tireless lover. He was nicknamed "Zanza", short for mosquito, because as soon as the deal was concluded, he would disappear in search of another woman. He is considered the most famous seducer of the Adriatic Sea and boasts of having had sex with more than 6000 women. In 1986, the periodical L'Espresso defined him as the lover most famous in Italy.

He first retired in 1995, aged 39 but the retirement did not last long. In his last interview with Bild in 2014, he announced his retirement, declaring that: "At 59, I'm too old for that." In 2016 he stated: "I think I have done more tourism promotion for Rimini than a hundred agencies". During the winter months he moved to the mountain tourist resort of Breuil-Cervinia where he ran a nightclub, which over the years changed its name from Blow Up (like the club in Rimini) to Princesse and finally Garage. He also worked for tourist agencies in Scandinavia and had a wax statue of him erected in a Swedish city. Articles claim that he and the staff at Blow Up recorded an unspecified "pop song" that once reached number 2 in the Swedish charts.

Zanfanti personally managed the Chic nightclub in Rimini for many years, then sold the business when he was almost fifty years of age.

It is thought that Zanfanti fathered a total of 9 children in Germany and Scandinavia.

Zanfanti was known for drinking milk instead of alcoholic beverages.

== Death ==
The 62 year old Zanfanti was in his car, a Mitsubishi Pajero, with a 25-year-old Romanian woman when he suffered a sudden illness around 2 in the morning. Once there, the rescuers could not do anything and declared his death. According to reconstructions, his heart stopped during or immediately after sexual intercourse in Rimini. His lover asked for help and the parish priest refused to make the church available for her funeral, they were celebrated in the Rimini cemetery.
