= Gábor Baraker =

Hungarian actor (1926–1983)

- Born: 10 June 1926; Budapest, Hungary
- Died: 30 April 1983 (aged 56); Algiers, Algeria
- Occupations: Actor, director
- Years active: 195?–1974

Gábor Baraker (10 June 1926 – 30 April 1983) was a Hungarian actor who performed in his home country, Australia and the United Kingdom.

== Early life ==
Before Baraker could complete his schooling, he and his Jewish family came under threat from the persecution of Jews during the latter years of the Second World War. As a result, his family's shops were confiscated, his parents and sister were sent to a concentration camp and he was sent to work in a Nazi Labour Camp. There, Baraker built railroad tracks, which he helped blow up again when Russian advances neared. With 32 others, he escaped and hid until the Russians passed by, following them into Budapest.

== Career ==
Having survived the Holocaust, Baraker was able to attend the Budapest Academy of Dramatic Art, passing a four-year course within three years. Becoming a member of the Budapest National Theatre, he won distinction in his home country, playing leading roles in the great classics, meeting the standard repertoire of the National Theatre.

Coming to Australia in July 1950 and not being able to speak English, Baraker used what little money he had to buy a bicycle. While cycling to work on his first journey, he was knocked off his bike and spent the next two months in hospital. During this time, he learnt English from the nurses looking after him.

After recovering, the Hungarian joined the Perth Repertory Theatre. Another technique he used to improve his English was saying lines in early roles without knowing what they meant. Soon, he found himself playing important roles in Arsenic and Old Lace and A Streetcar Named Desire. During his time, the actor also became fluent in German.

Moving to Melbourne to join his parents and sister, Baraker appeared for the University of Melbourne's Union Theatre and Princess Theatre in many productions like Thieves' Carnival, Bus Stop, Death of a Salesman, The Diary of Anne Frank and Bells Are Ringing, finding success as both an actor and director.

Arriving in England in 1962, Baraker made appearances in episodes of cult TV shows including Man of the World, Compact, Crane, Doctor Who (serials: Marco Polo and The Crusade), Redcap, No Hiding Place, Dixon of Dock Green, The Champions and The Saint as well as films including uncredited roles in the James Bond movie Thunderball (1965, as SPECTRE #13) and in the Pink Panther entry Inspector Clouseau (1968, as Swiss Banker). His theatre credits include Fiddler on the Roof at Her Majesty's Theatre in the West End, Fiddlers Three at Theatre Royal, Bath (1972-1973) and Bernard Pomerance's Someone Else is Still Someone at the Bush Theatre (1974).

== Filmography ==
Year	Title	Role	Notes
1965	Thunderball	SPECTRE #13	Uncredited
1966	Where the Spies Are	2nd Agent	
1966	Kaleidoscope	Caleidoscópio	Uncredited
1966	Drop Dead Darling	Gypsy Baron	
1967	Smashing Time	Night Club Owner	
1968	Inspector Clouseau	Swiss Banker	Uncredited
1969	Vendetta for the Saint	Barman	
