= Lava lamp =

Decorative lamp

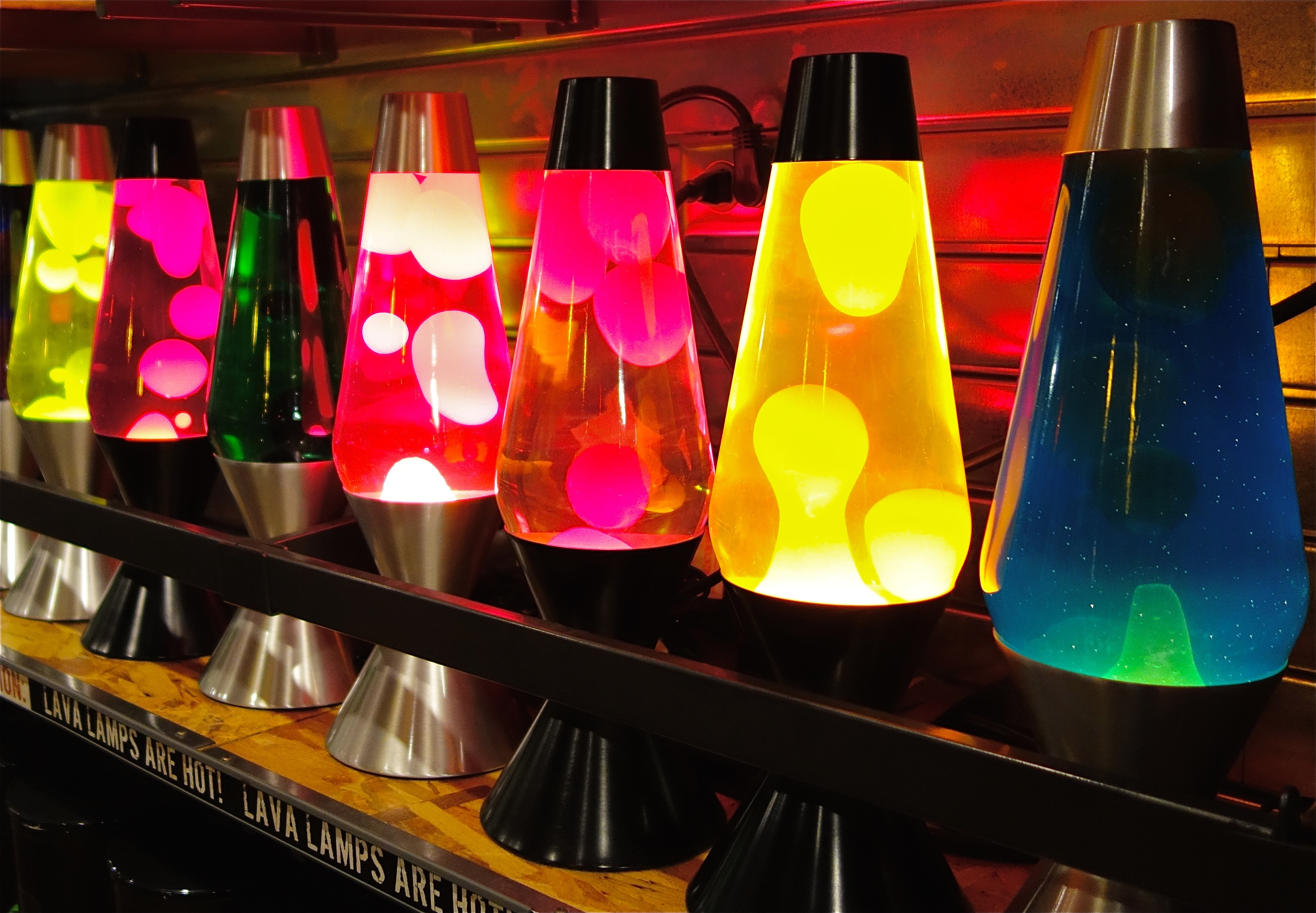
Lava lamps

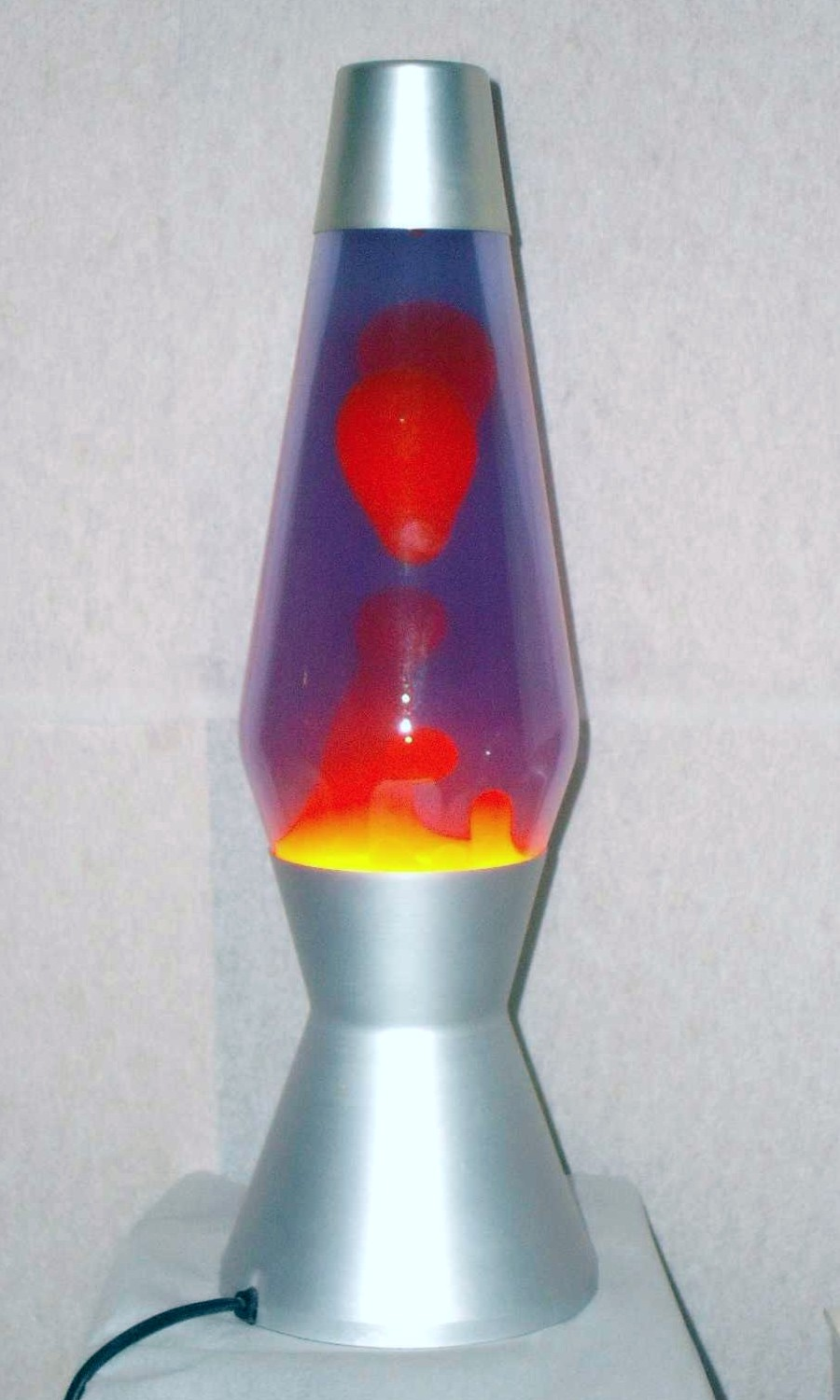
An original Mathmos Astro lava lamp

A lava lamp is a decorative lamp that was invented in 1963 by British entrepreneur Edward Craven Walker, the founder of the lighting company Mathmos.

Lava lamps consist of a bolus of wax and a clear or translucent liquid inside a glass vessel. The vessel is placed on a lamp base with an incandescent light bulb. The heat causes temporary reductions in the wax's density and the liquid's surface tension. As the warmed wax rises through the liquid, it cools, loses its buoyancy, and falls back to the bottom of the vessel in a cycle that is visually suggestive of pāhoehoe lava. The lamps are designed in a variety of styles and colours.

Lava lamps are commonly associated with hippie, psychedelia, and cannabis cultures.

== Operation ==
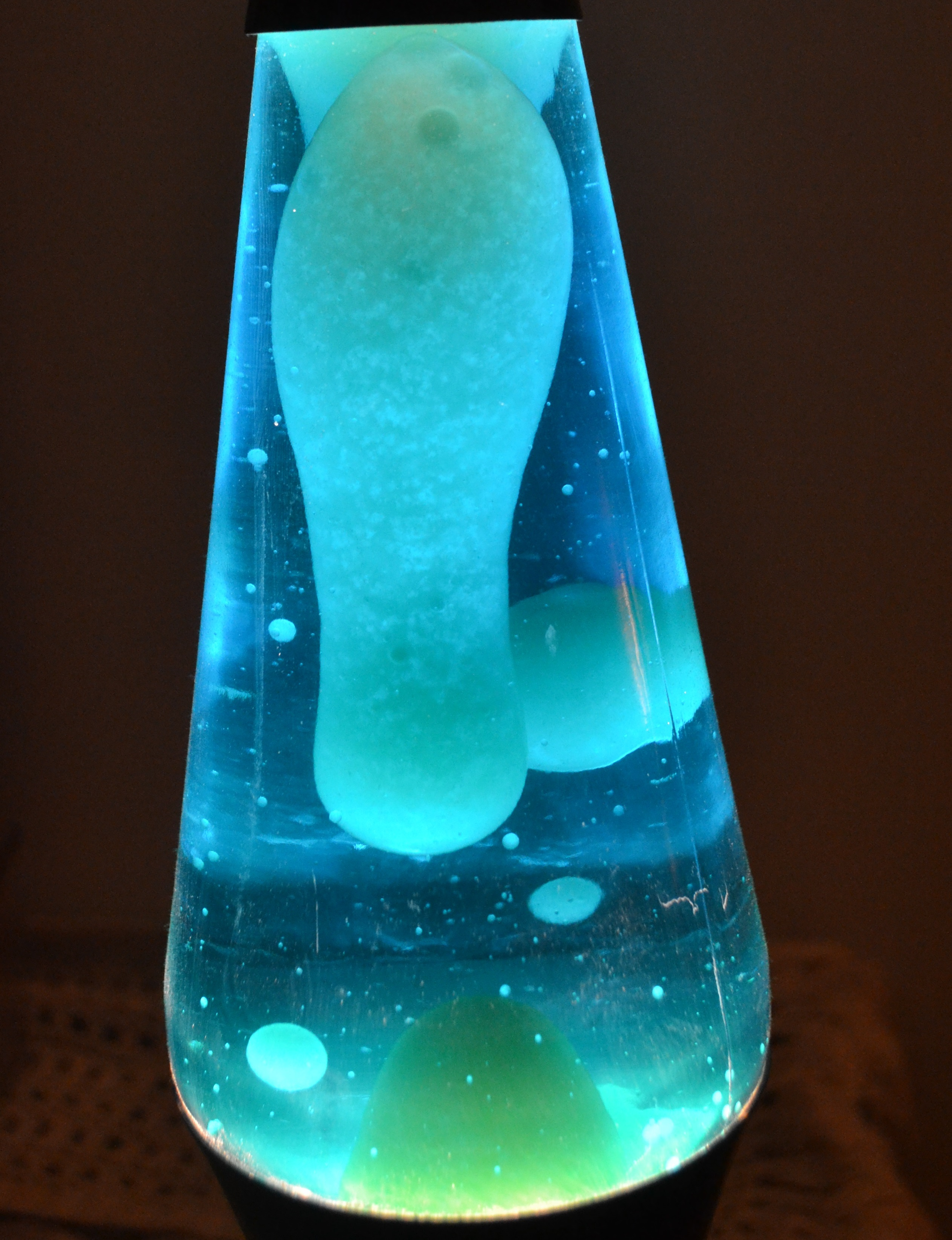
A cyan lava lamp

A classic lava lamp contains a standard incandescent or halogen lamp which heats a tall (often tapered) glass bottle. A formula from a 1968 US patent consisted of water and a transparent, translucent, or opaque mix of mineral oil, paraffin wax, and carbon tetrachloride. The clear water or mineral oil can optionally be coloured with translucent dyes.

Common wax has a density much lower than water and floats at any temperature. Carbon tetrachloride is about 60% denser than water (also nonflammable and miscible with wax) and can be added to increase the wax density at room temperature. When heated, the wax expands, becomes less dense, and rises. The wax also becomes fluid, causing blobs to ascend to the top of the lamp. As it cools, its density increases and it sinks. A metallic wire coil in the bottle's base breaks the cooled blobs' surface tension, allowing them to merge and repeat the cycle.

Video of an orange lava lamp in operation

Since 1970, lava lamps made for the US market have not used carbon tetrachloride, the use of which was banned in the country that year due to toxicity. Haggerty, their current manufacturer, has stated that their current formulation is a trade secret.

The underlying fluid mechanics phenomenon in lava lamps is a form of Rayleigh–Taylor instability.

Agitating the lamp once the wax has melted causes the two fluids to emulsify, resulting in a cloudy appearance. Some emulsification occurs during the lamp cycle; however, the wax reforms into a single mass upon cooling. Severe cases can require many heating-cooling cycles to clear.

In 2015, a new design was introduced that uses ferrofluid in place of wax.

== History ==
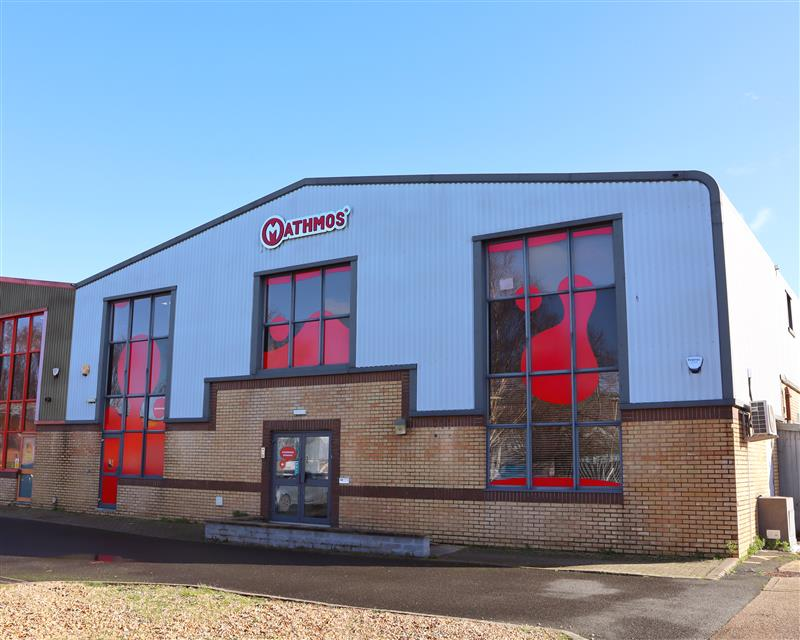
The Mathmos Lava Lamp Factory in Poole, Dorset where they were first commercially produced.

British entrepreneur Edward Craven Walker conceived the lava lamp after observing a homemade egg timer made from a cocktail shaker bubbling on a pub stove. This precursor was designed and patented GB patent 703924 by Donald Dunnet. Crestworth later launched the first 'Astro' lava lamp in 1963. After the lamp's commercial launch, Craven Walker worked with British inventor David George Smith, who is listed as the inventor on U.S. Patent 3,387,396 for a 'Display Device,' filed in 1965, issued in 1968, and assigned to Craven Walker's company, Crestworth Ltd, based in Poole, Dorset.

In 1965, Adolph Wertheimer and Hy Spector were intrigued by Walker's product when they saw it at a German trade show. They bought the American rights and began the Lava Manufacturing Corporation in Chicago to sell what they called the Lava Lite Lamp. In the late 1970s, US rights were sold to Larry Haggerty, who created a subsidiary of his company, Haggerty Enterprises, called Lava World International, which produced American lava lamps for over 30 years.

In 2003, American lava lamp maker Lava World International (formerly Lava-Simplex-Scribe Internationale) moved its production to China. In 2008, it was acquired by Talon Merchant Capital and its name was changed to Lava Lite LLC. As of 2016, lava lamps were being sold under Lifespan brands in North America. In 2018, the "Lava Lamp" brand was acquired by toy and gift maker Schylling Inc. of North Andover, MA. who continue to hold the US trademark rights to both the shape and name of LAVA lamp.

When the American rights were sold, Craven Walker retained the rights for the rest of the world and took on two business partners in the late 1980s, Cressida Granger and David Mulley. They eventually took over the company and changed its name to Mathmos in 1992. Edward Craven Walker remained a consultant to them until his death in 2000. Mathmos continues to make Lava Lamps and related products. They have won two Queens Awards for Export, and the Best Multi-Media prize at the Design Week awards. Astro lava lamp was launched in 1963 and celebrated its 50th anniversary in 2013. Mathmos lava lamps have been made in Poole, Dorset, since 1963.

== See also ==
- Bubble light – Bubbling decorative light
- Lavarand – Random number generator
- Liquid light show – Psychedelic art form
- Plasma globe – Decorative electrical device
