= Fiddlers Three (play) =

1972 play written by Agatha Christie

- Written by: Agatha Christie
- Original language: English

Premiere
- Date premiered: 1 August 1972
- Place premiered: United Kingdom

Fiddlers Three is a play written by Agatha Christie in 1972.

It was first written as Fiddlers Five, under which title it toured successfully in 1971, after opening at Southsea on 7 June. The following year, the revised version toured briefly after its premiere at the Yvonne Arnaud Theatre in Guildford on 1 August, with Doris Hare and Raymond Francis heading the cast. This production was directed by Allan Davis, with sets designed by Anthony Holland and lighting by Michael Saddington.

Christie had pushed for the play to be performed, much against the wishes of her daughter, Rosalind Hicks, who was protective of her mother's reputation and felt that this piece would damage it. The revised version incorporated several suggestions from Davis, who had seen the previous 1971 version.

Despite touring more extensively in 1973, this time directed by Jan Butlin, with Peggy Mount starring opposite Raymond Francis, the play never transferred to the West End.

== Cast ==
- Julia Knight as Gina Jones
- Doris Hare as Sally Blunt
- Raymond Francis as Sam Fletcher
- Gábor Baraker as Felix Bogusian
- Mark Wing-Davey as Henry Panhacker
- John Boswall as Jonathan Panhacker
- Suzanne Barrett as An Air Hostess
- Daphne Newton as Dr Nolan
- Bruce Montague as A Waiter
- Arthur Howard as Mr Trustcott
- George Lacy as Mr Moss
