= Ken Hodges (cinematographer) =

British cinematographer

- Born: 25 October 1922; Blackheath, London, United Kingdom
- Died: 2005 (aged 82–83)
- Other name: Kenneth Hodges
- Occupation: Cinematographer
- Years active: 1947–1991 (film & TV)

Ken Hodges (1922–2005) was a British cinematographer of film and television. He began as an assistant cameraman just after the Second World War.

== Selected filmography ==
=== Cinema ===
- Behemoth the Sea Monster (1959)
- Desert Mice (1959)
- Danger Tomorrow (1960)
- The Gentle Trap (1960)
- Faces in the Dark (1960)
- Sword of Sherwood Forest (1960)
- A Weekend with Lulu (1961)
- Ticket to Paradise (1961)
- Freedom to Die (1961)
- Night Without Pity (1961)
- Emergency (1962)
- Doomsday at Eleven (1962)
- Two Letter Alibi (1962)
- Dead Man's Evidence (1962)
- Gaolbreak (1962)
- Hair of the Dog (1962)
- It's All Happening (1963)
- The Comedy Man (1964)
- The Great St. Trinian's Train Robbery (1966)
- The Jokers (1967)
- The Shuttered Room (1967)
- Assignment K (1968)
- Inadmissible Evidence (1968)
- Last of the Long-haired Boys (1968)
- Negatives (1968)
- The File of the Golden Goose (1969)
- Every Home Should Have One (1970)
- Assault (1971)
- Revenge (1971)
- The Ruling Class (1972)
- Never Mind the Quality Feel the Width (1973)
- Penny Gold (1973)
- No Sex Please, We're British (1973)
- Feelings (1974)
- The Spiral Staircase (1975)
- Confessions of a Driving Instructor (1976)
- Stand Up, Virgin Soldiers (1977)
- Confessions from a Holiday Camp (1977)
- The Odd Job (1978)

=== Television ===
- The Buccaneers (1956)
- The Adventures of Sir Lancelot (1956)
- The Adventures of Robin Hood (1956-1960)
- Sword of Freedom (1957-1959)
- The Four Just Men (1959–60)
- Espionage (1963-1964)
- The Third Man (1964)
- Danger Man (1964)
- Court Martial (1965–66)
- Star Maidens (1976)

== Bibliography ==
- Howard Maxford. Hammer Complete: The Films, the Personnel, the Company. McFarland, 2018.
