= Night Train to Paris =

1964 film by Robert Douglas

Night Train To Paris
- DVD cover
- Directed by: Robert Douglas
- Written by: Harry Spalding as Henry Cross
- Produced by: Robert L. Lippert; Jack Parsons
- Starring: Leslie Nielsen; Aliza Gur; Dorinda Stevens; Eric Pohlmann
- Cinematography: Arthur Lavis
- Edited by: Robert Winter
- Music by: Kenny Graham
- Production company: Lippert Pictures
- Distributed by: 20th Century Fox
- Release date: 23 September 1964
- Running time: 65 minutes
- Countries: United States; United Kingdom
- Language: English

Night Train to Paris is a 1964 British-American spy film directed by Robert Douglas and starring Leslie Nielsen, Aliza Gur and Dorinda Stevens. It was written by Harry Spalding (as Henry Cross).

== Plot ==
In London, secret agents are pursuing a reel of tape with defence information on it. Meanwhile, former OSS officer Alan Holiday is busy fending off requests for tickets on a boat train to Paris. There is no space because it is New Year's Eve.

Holiday is visited by Catherine Carrel. She is a friend of Jules Lemoine, a former OSS officer who served with Holiday during the Korean War. She convinces Holiday to help Lemoine deliver the tape to Paris. The plan is to secrete the tape aboard the night train while they travel as assistants and models for the photographer Louis Vernay. Lemoine will remain in London with a decoy reel.

Before they can leave, Lemoine is killed and the fake tape stolen. Holiday rushes to the train with the genuine tape. He poses as Vernay's assistant. On board, they meet Olive Davies who quickly deduces Holiday's identity is false.

A raucous New Year's party provides cover for Holiday as he eludes Lemoine's assassin. At Dunkirk, Catherine incapacitates Olive and pursues Holiday for the tape. After a brief firefight, Catherine is captured by reinforcements Olive has summoned in her capacity as a spy. Holiday is relieved to hand the tape to Olive and be rid of it.

== Cast ==
- Leslie Nielsen as Alan Holiday
- Aliza Gur as Catherine Carrel
- Dorinda Stevens as Olive Davies
- Eric Pohlmann as Krogh
- Edina Ronay as Julie
- André Maranne as Louis Vernay
- Cyril Raymond as Insp. Fleming
- Hugh Latimer as Jules Lemoine
- Jack Melford as PC inspector
- Simon Oates as Saunders
- Trevor Reid as policeman on train
- Stanley Morgan as plainclothesman
- Jenny White as Vernay's model

== Reception ==
The Monthly Film Bulletin wrote: "Weak invention, mundane playing and nondescript direction make this a very flat-footed espionage melodrama. The opening scenes in London, and the cat-and-mouse finale, sandwich a lengthy middle section aboard the train, where the setting is not well exploited and the raucous party revelry is allowed to become too repetitive in order to spin out a meagre plot. The more lively climax, with its moderately unexpected twist, is insufficient compensation for the film's prevailing mediocrity."

The Film Daily wrote: "Night Train to Paris is a neat, little suspense film that will be a fine addition to any double bill. Its length probably automatically relegates it to second feature".

In The New York Times, Howard Thompson wrote: "Night Train to Paris — there's an intriguing title. But, believe us, this thumpingly mediocre little suspense melodrama that drifted into neighborhood theaters yesterday can go back to where it came from. There have been worse plots but few more familiar...starchy dialogue is neatly matched by Robert Douglas's flat-footed direction...The most attractive thing about the whole picture is a nifty blonde named Dorinda Stevens. The woman can act, too, which is more than can be said for most of the others."
