= Mathmos =

British lighting products company

Mathmos Limited
- Formerly: Primedyke Imports & Exports Limited (July–September 1990); Crestworth Trading Limited (1990–1997)
- Industry: Lighting
- Founded: 1963
- Founder: Edward Craven Walker
- Headquarters: Poole, Dorset, United Kingdom
- Key people: Cressida Granger; (CEO)
- Products: Lava lamps, other lighting products
- Website: mathmos.com

Mathmos Limited is a British company that sells lighting products, most famously the lava lamp invented by its founder Edward Craven Walker. It is headquartered in its factory in Poole, Dorset.

== Company history ==
The Astro lamp, or lava lamp, was invented around 1963 by Edward Craven Walker. It was adapted from a design for an egg timer spotted in a pub in Dorset, England. Edward and Christine Craven-Walker licensed the product to a number of overseas markets whilst continuing to manufacture for the European market themselves under the original name of the company, Crestworth. The rights to produce and sell the lamp on the American market for the duration of the patent were sold to Lava Simplex International, in 1966. The American company has now closed the American factory and has the lava lamps made in China.

In Europe Craven-Walker’s original lava lamp designs have been in continuous production since the early 1960s and are still made today by Mathmos in Poole, Dorset, UK. The Mathmos lava lamp formula developed initially by Craven-Walker in the 1960s and then improved with his help in the 1990s is still used.

Lava lamp sales by Mathmos have been through a number of ups and downs. After selling millions of lamps worldwide in the 1960s and 70s, they did not revive until the 1990s. In 1989, Cressida Granger and David Mulley took over the running of Walker's original company, Crestworth, situated in Poole, Dorset, and changed the name to Mathmos in 1992.

The name Mathmos comes from the seething lake of energy resembling lava beneath city Sogo in the 1962 comic Barbarella.

The 1990s re-launch of the original lava lamps saw sales grow strongly for Mathmos again from 10,000 lamps a year in 1989 to 800,000 lamps a year in 1999. Mathmos won two Queens Awards for Export and a number of other business awards. Edward Craven-Walker remained a consultant and company director at Mathmos until his death in 2000.

== Modern Mathmos ==
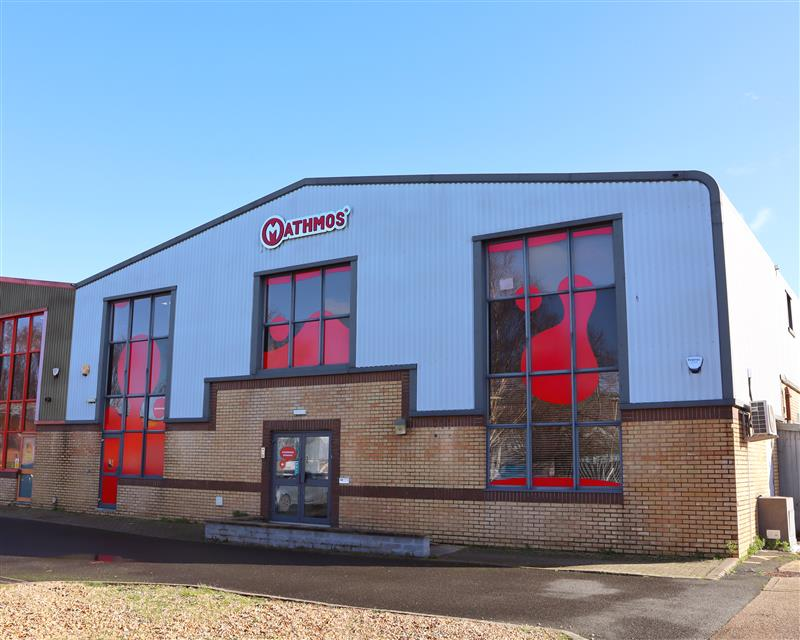
The Mathmos Lava Lamp Factory in Poole, Dorset.

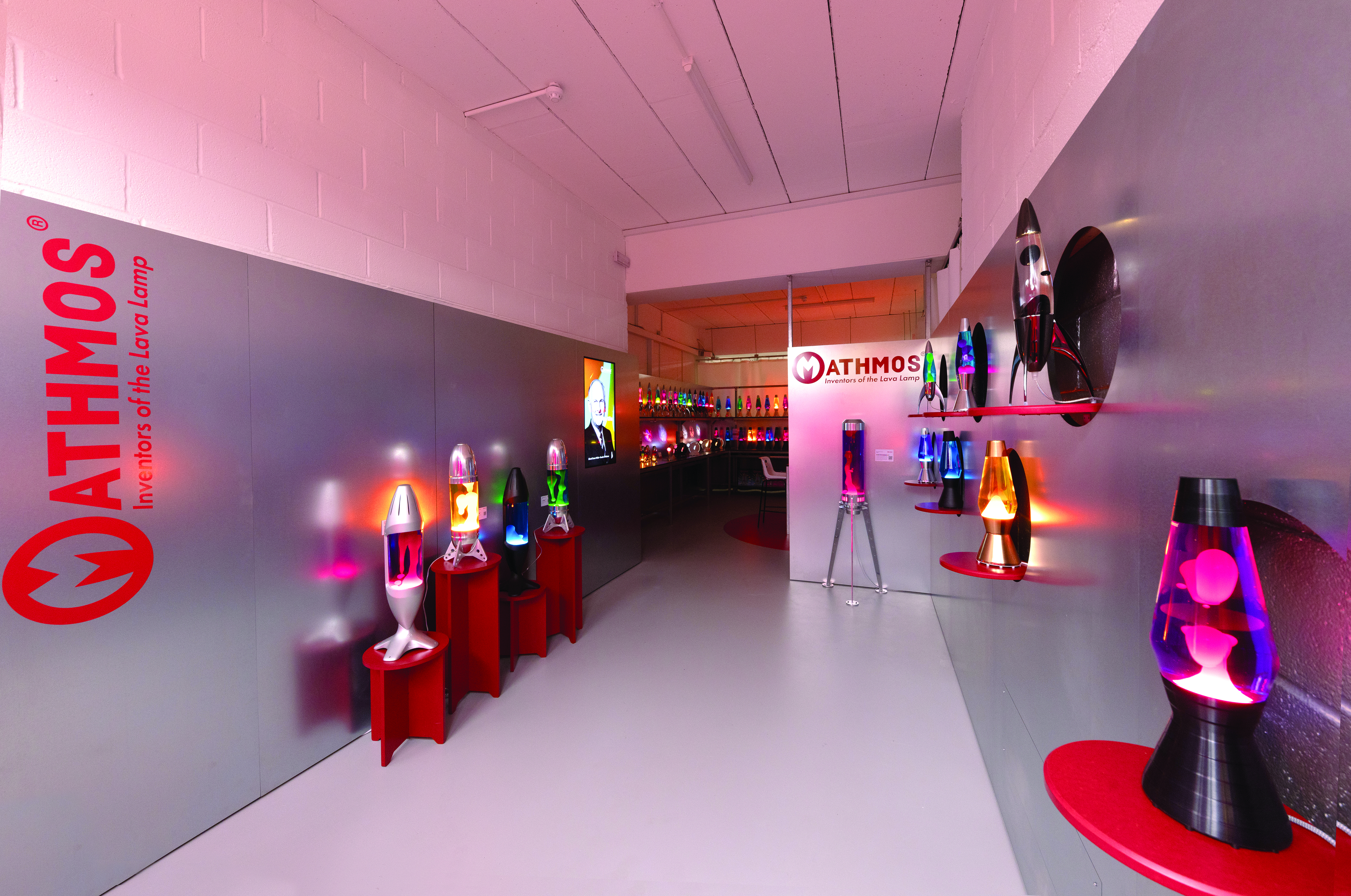
Mathmos lava lamp showroom at the company headquarters in Poole, Dorset, United Kingdom.

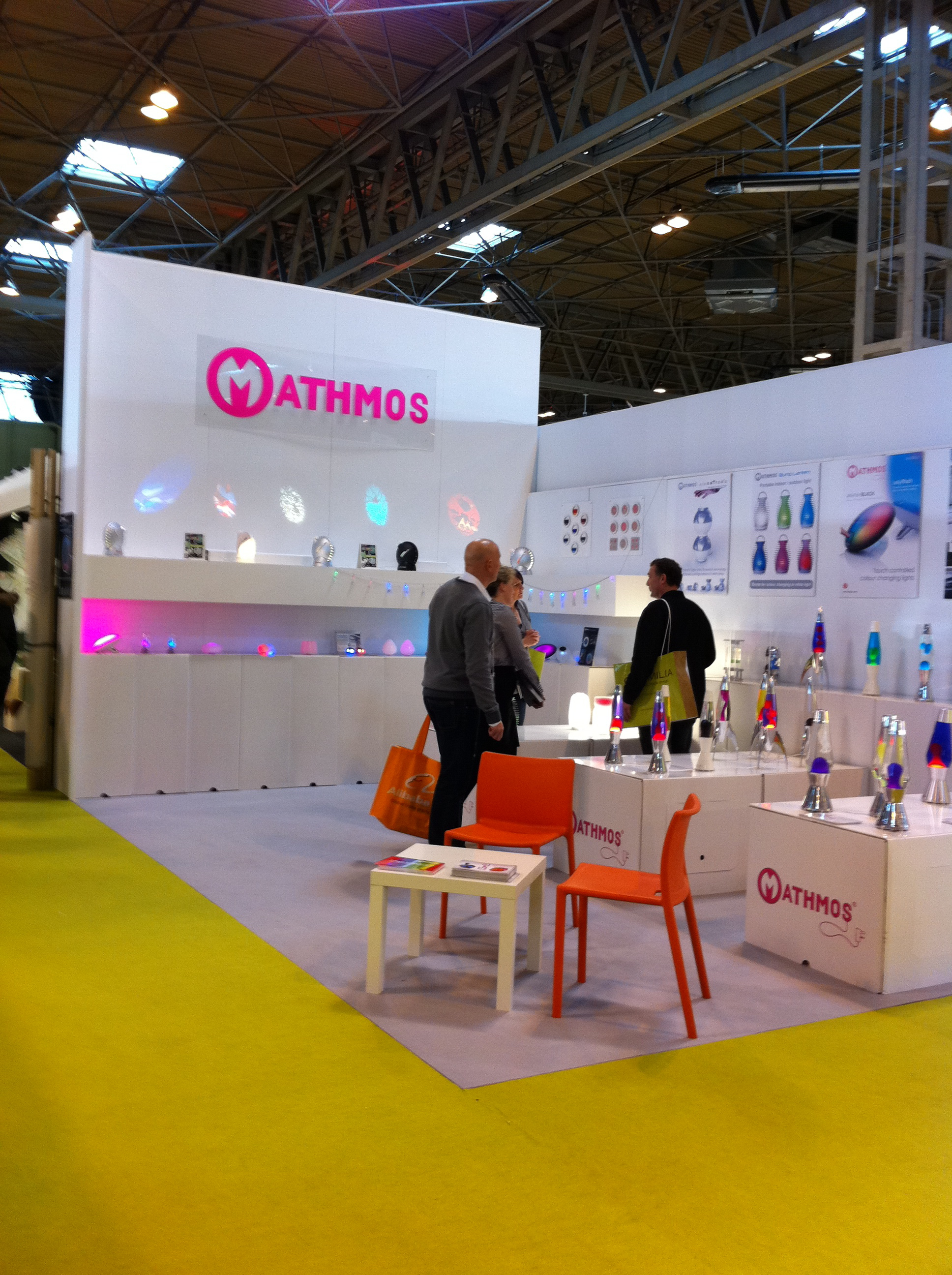
Mathmos, trade show in Birmingham, England, September 2011

Since 1999, and under the sole ownership of Cressida Granger, Mathmos widened its product range whilst maintaining and building on the classic Mathmos lava lamp range. Mathmos developed new products both in house with the Mathmos Design Studio and with a number of external designers such as Ross Lovegrove, El Ultimo Grito, Studio Job, and Sabine Marcelis.

New lines include a range of colour changing and rechargeable lights, several of which have won design awards. Mathmos has recently turned its attention back to its classic British made lava lamp range In 2013, it celebrated its 50th anniversary with a limited edition of the classic Astro by Christine Craven Walker, wife and business partner of the inventor. They also showed the biggest lava lamp in the world in London’s Southbank Centre.

In 2016, Mathmos launched Neo, the first lava lamp tested for children and adults, and opened a “Special Projects” division offering giant bespoke lava lamps. The first one is in Selfridges, London as part the new accessories department designed by David Chipperfield.

In 2017 Mathmos launched Neo wall the only wall mounted lava lamp. Mathmos also launched their first limited edition collaboration with Liam Gallagher's fashion brand Pretty Green during London Design Week with a window in London’s Carnaby Street.

Mathmos celebrated the centenary of the birth of its founder and the inventor of the lava lamp Edward Craven Walker in 2018. Mathmos lava lamps appeared in a number of exhibitions including Pop & Protest and the Festival of Lights in Berlin that year. Mathmos also launched its second sell-out collaboration with Pretty Green and had a dedicated programme on its British production process as part of ITV's Made in Britain series.

A new giant lava lamp iO was launched in 2019 the FIRST100 numbered edition selling out within hours. New candle powered lava lamps Pod and Pod + were also launched. The new lamps were photographed at Second Home co-working space in London Fields and in the iconic Barbican in London.

In 2020 Mathmos teamed with Poole Museum as part of the Light Up Poole event. Showcasing its lava lamps in the windows and throughout the museum. Mathmos moved into a new larger factory in Poole just before lockdown and has stayed open through the Covid-19 pandemic working safely throughout.

== Business and marketing awards ==
- Queens Awards for Export 2000 and 1997
- Fast Track 100 (3rd fastest growing manufacturer 1999)
- Yell Award best commercial website 1997
- Design Week Best Consumer website 1998

== Product design awards ==
- "Grito" lamp shade: Red Dot Award 2006
- "Airswitch tc" light: Gift Magazine Design Homewares winner 2005.
- "Aduki" Design Week commendation 2003
- "Tumbler" light: Form 2001 award, Red Dot Award 2002, Design Week commendation 2002
- "Fluidium": Design Week finalist best consumer product 2001, FX Magazine finalist best lighting product 2000
- "Bubble" Light: Industrial Design Excellence Award (IDEA) 2001, D&AD commendation 2001, Red Dot Award 2001, Light Magazine Decorative Lighting Award 2001

== Exhibitions and design yearbooks ==
- Mathmos Vintage Lava Lamp Exhibition 2009 at London Design Festival
- "Astro" Design Icons Exhibition Harrods & Design Museum 2008
- "Telstar" Space Age, Museum of Childhood 2007
- "bubble, Airswitch tc, aduki ni, grito" all in the V&A permanent collection from 2006
- "Airswitch tc" V&A "Touch Me" exhibition spring 2005
- "Fluidium" "Blobjects and Beyond" San Jose Museum of Art 2005
- ‘bubble" Great Expectations Exhibition Design Council 2003
- "Aduki" light: International Design Year Book 2003
- "Tumbler" International Design Year Book 2002.
- "Bubble" "Skin" exhibition at Cooper Hewitt Museum New York 2001
- "bubble" Design Council exhibition New York 2002, International Design Year Book 2001
- 50th Birthday Exhibition at The Royal Festival Hall London September 2013
- Launch of 50th Birthday limited edition Astro at Aria, Islington, London; September 2013
- Astro displayed at The Geffrye Museum London as part of The London Design Festival
- Mathmos Lava Lamps Poole Museum as part of Light Up Poole 2020 >
- “Astro Lava Lamp” at Pop & Protest Exhibition at Museum für Kunst und Gewerbe Hamburg 2019
