= Sunswept =

1962 naturist film by Edward Craven Walker

- Theatrical release poster
- Directed by: Edward Craven Walker (as "Michael Keatering")
- Written by: Anthony Craven
- Produced by: Edward Craven Walker
- Starring: Liza Raine; Yannick Philouze
- Cinematography: Edward Craven Walker
- Production company: Michael Keatering Productions
- Distributed by: Gala
- Release date: January 1962
- Country: United Kingdom
- Language: English

Sunswept is a 1962 British naturist film directed by Edward Craven Walker (as Michael Keatering) and starring Liza Raine and Yannick Philouze.

== Plot ==
A group of naturists visit nudist camps in Corsica, the Isle of Levant, and Yugoslavia.

== Cast ==
- Liza Raine as narrator
- Yannick Philouze as underwater swimmer (billed as "Yannick")
- Ingrid as piano player
- Karen as water skier
- Elizabeth Walker
- Lita Soria

== Reception ==
The Monthly Film Bulletin wrote: "Stunning Eastman Colour photography; unselfconscious nudists sunning themselves, swimming underwater and giving midnight pianoforte recitals; Tchaikowsky and a flowery commentary on the soundtrack. Approved by the Federation of British Sun Clubs, the film is genuinely wholesome and rather charming in an artless kind of way."

Kine Weekly wrote: " 'Fig-Leaf' opus, brilliantly photographed in Eastman Color. ... Producer-director Michael Keatering's lensing, particularly of the marine sequences, is superb, while Liza Raine's commentary strengthens continuity. The film's not only a boost for 'nature in the raw,' firmly endorsed by the Federation of British Sun Clubs, but also delightful and bracing entertainment. Persuasive and innocuous, it's enough to make prim Aunt Agatha cast her clouts!"
