= Theodore Zichy =

British actor, photographer, film director, producer and playboy (1908–1987)

Theodore Zichy in The Life and Death of Colonel Blimp (1943)

Count Theodore Béla Rudolf Zichy de Zich et Vásonkeő (Hungarian: Zichi és Vásonkeői gróf Zichy Tivadar Béla Rudolf; 13 June 1908 – 30 December 1987) was a British actor, photographer, film director, producer and playboy of Hungarian descent.

== Early life ==
Born in Eastbourne in Sussex in 1908, the son of Count Béla Mária Rudolf Zichy de Zich et Vásonkeő (1868–1944), a Hungarian aristocrat, and an American mother, Mabel Elizabeth Wright (1865–1926, formerly Mrs. Fernando Yznaga), his brother was Edward George Béla Mária Zichy de Zich et Vásonkeő (1898–1958). A great-nephew of Mihály Zichy, Theodore Zichy held British and Hungarian citizenship.

== Career ==
In 1928, he started racing Bugattis, which he continued on and off until 1932.

He learned to fly at Brooklands in the late 1930s, owned a de Havilland Puss Moth registered G-AAXY and kept this at Brooklands from 1938 to 1939 and served in the Air Transport Auxiliary as a First Officer from 1940 to 1941. Some forty years later, he recalled his experiences as a ferry pilot in various articles published in Aeroplane Monthly magazine.

As a photographer he mainly took pictures of women's legs, feet and shoes. His 1948 photograph portfolio Chiaroscuros (from the Italian "chiaroscuro") contained images of foot and shoe fetishism. In the mid-1950s he worked as a photographer for Baron Studios in London. His autobiography That Was No Gentleman, That Was Zichy was published in 1974.

=== Film career ===
As an actor Zichy appeared as 2nd in Command in Gasbags (1941), Colonel Borg in The Life and Death of Colonel Blimp (1943), as the Duel Referee in the TV movie Liebelei (1954), and as a German Agent in Private's Progress (1956).

Later, he directed and produced the shorts Death Was a Passenger (1958), Portrait of a Matador (1958) and Mingaloo (1958), also writing the latter, as well as directing and producing the films Night Without Pity (1961) and Doomsday at Eleven (1963). He produced the film Bomb in the High Street (1961).

== Personal life ==
On 20 February 1928, he married Xenia V. Howard Johnston (1904–1931) in Paris, France; the couple divorced in 1930. In 1964 he married Daphne Barker (previously of the Jack and Daphne Barker Cabaret duo) in London and stayed married to her until her death in 1987.

Count Theodore Zichy died by suicide at home, 8 Sandwich Street, Bloomsbury, London WC1 on 30 December 1987. His death certificate was issued in 1988.
