= East of Piccadilly =

1941 British film by Harold Huth

- Original movie poster
- Directed by: Harold Huth
- Screenplay by: J. Lee Thompson; Lesley Storm
- Based on: story East of Piccadilly by Gordon Beckles
- Produced by: Walter C. Mycroft
- Starring: Judy Campbell; Sebastian Shaw; Niall MacGinnis
- Cinematography: Claude Friese-Greene
- Music by: Marr Mackie
- Distributed by: Associated British Picture Corporation; Producers Releasing Corporation (US)
- Release date: 5 July 1941
- Running time: 75 minutes
- Country: United Kingdom
- Language: English

East of Piccadilly (U.S. title: The Strangler) is a 1941 British mystery film directed by Harold Huth and starring Judy Campbell, Sebastian Shaw, Niall MacGinnis, Henry Edwards, Martita Hunt, Charles Victor and Frederick Piper. The screenplay was by J. Lee Thompson and Lesley Storm based on the story of the same title by Gordon Beckles.

== Plot ==
A series of murders in the West End of London baffle the officers of Scotland Yard and draw the interest of crime reporter Pennie Sutton and pulp writer Tamsie Green.

== Cast ==
- Judy Campbell as Penny Sutton
- Sebastian Shaw as Tamsie Green
- Niall MacGinnis as Joe
- Henry Edwards as Inspector
- George Pughe as Oscar Kuloff
- Martita Hunt as Ma
- George Hayes as Mark Struberg
- Cameron Hall as George
- Edana Romney as Sadie Jones
- Bunty Payne as Tania
- Charles Victor as editor
- Frederick Piper as Ginger Harris
- Bill Fraser as Maxie

== Critical reception ==
The Monthly Film Bulletin wrote: "The film captures the authentic squalid atmosphere of the demi-monde of Soho and the night clubs and the queer humanity that live in the crowded tenement houses, and there is sufficient humour both in the dialogue and the situations to lift it out of the common rut of such films. Judy Campbell makes a not-so-hard-boiled crime reporter, Niall McGinnis gives a good study of a Cockney peanut-seller, dragged by accident into the atmosphere of crime, and Martita Hunt as the proprietress of a café puts a lot of real acting into a small part."

Kine Weekly wrote: "The plot, based on a story by Gordon Beckles, is not lacking in ingenuity, but its thrills and psychological implications are, at times, clouded by unnecessary atmospheric trimmings. Digs at dramatic critics, a drawn-out court scene, and humour at the expense of an eccentric Shakespearian actor hamper rather than amplify the plot."

The Daily Film Renter wrote: "Every known ingredient of the chiller finds a place in this turgid story of Soho side street."

Picturegoer wrote: "This murder mystery melodrama is rather overwhelmed by detail and it does not ring particularly true. It is quite ingenious in design, but not so successful in development. ... There are a number of thrills and some of the characterisation is good. Judy Campbell does well as a crime reporter who, with the assistance of Tamsie Green, a novelist, played adequately by Sebastian Shaw, tracks down the killer. That old timer, Henry Edwards is good as a detective and sound perormances come from George Pughe and Niall McGinnis."

TV Guide called it an "outdated mystery yarn".
