= The Gentle Trap =

1960 British film by Charles Saunders

- Directed by: Charles Saunders
- Screenplay by: Brock Williams
- Produced by: Jack Parsons
- Starring: Spencer Teakle; Felicity Young; Martin Benson
- Cinematography: Ken Hodges
- Edited by: Peter Pitt
- Production company: Butcher's Film Service
- Release date: 1960
- Running time: 61 minutes
- Country: United Kingdom
- Language: English

The Gentle Trap is a 1960 British second feature ('B') black and white film directed by Charles Saunders and starring Spencer Teakle, Felicity Young and Martin Benson. It was written by Brock Williams and produced by Jack Parsons for Butcher's Film Service.

== Plot ==
When a diamond robbery goes wrong, young locksmith turned first-time thief Johnny Ryan is on the run from the police and from crooked club owner Ricky Barnes. Ryan seeks refuge in a seedy nightclub and meets Mary, a tough blonde who lets him hide in her flat, which she shares with her sister Jean. When Mary betrays Ryan to Barnes, Jean helps Ryan escape to her uncle's farm. The police arrive, and Jean and Ryan realise that they have fallen in love.

== Cast ==
- Spencer Teakle as Johnny Ryan
- Felicity Young as Jean
- Martin Benson as Ricky Barnes
- Dorinda Stevens as Mary
- Dawn Brooks as Sylvia
- Alan Edwards as Al Jenkins
- Hugh Latimer as Vic Carter
- Larry Burns as Ted
- Colin Reid as Inspector Stevenson
- Arthur Hewlett as Sam
- Keith Marsh as Pete
- James Mcloughlin as Sergeant
- John Dunbar as uncle

== Reception ==
The Monthly Film Bulletin wrote: "A cut to pattern, rough-and-ready crime thriller, energetically performed but too transparent to maintain the necessary tension."

The Radio Times Guide to Films gave the film 1/5 stars, writing: "This utterly threadbare British B-movie is about an apprentice locksmith who goes on the run from the police and local gangsters. It was made by the low-budget production company Butcher's, and everyone involved made a hash of it. Only devoted fans of its leading actor Spencer Teakle and actress Felicity Young, who plays a rather feeble femme fatale, will bother to watch."

In The British 'B' Film, Chibnall and McFarlane call the film "shoddy".
