= Edward Craven Walker =

English inventor and film director (1918–2000)

- Born: 4 July 1918; Singapore
- Died: 15 August 2000 (aged 82); Ringwood, Hampshire, England
- Occupations: Inventor; Founder of Mathmos
- Spouses: Marjorie Bevan Jones; Elizabeth Elcoate Gilbert; Christine Baehr

Edward Craven Walker (4 July 1918 – 15 August 2000) was a British inventor, who invented the psychedelic Astro lamp, also known as the lava lamp.

== War record ==
Craven was a pilot in World War II, flying a photo reconnaissance DeHavilland Mosquito over Germany to take photographs. He met his first wife, Marjorie Bevan Jones, at an air base where she was with the WAAF.

== The Astro lamp ==
=== Genesis ===
After the war, Craven developed an idea he saw in a country pub in Dorset. The pub had a contraption made by a regular, Donald Dunnett, a one-off device which used two immiscible fluids as an egg timer. While it was rudimentary, Craven saw potential and set about perfecting it and turning it into a lamp. In his shed he mixed ingredients in bottles of different shapes and sizes. He discovered one of the best containers was a Tree Top orange squash bottle, and its shape subsequently defined the Astro Baby Lamp or Astro Mini as it was then called.

=== Industry ===
Craven with his wife Christine set up a company, Crestworth and then Mathmos, to produce the lamps, operating from small buildings on an industrial estate in Poole, Dorset. Walker said of his lamp, "I think it will always be popular. It is like the cycle of life. It grows, breaks up, falls down and then starts all over again.

In the late 1970s, the popularity of the hippie style abated somewhat, and lava lamps fell out of fashion. The Walkers kept their company going throughout the 1980s but scaled back operations.

Original Mathmos lamps are still made by the same company in the UK, including updated versions of their classic designs.

=== Later years ===
In the early 1990s, a young couple began manufacturing and selling them successfully. Cressida Granger and David Mulley approached Craven and took over running the company and renamed it Mathmos in 1992. Initially they were in partnership with Edward and Christine Craven Walker and the company was called Crestworth Trading Ltd. Over a period of years, they bought out the Walkers bit by bit.

They had the rights to produce Astro Lamps and continued to manufacture in the same location, using almost the same staff, machinery and even some of the 1960s components. Craven Walker remained a consultant at Mathmos until his death in 2000, helping particularly to improve the formula of the lamps.

Astro lamp has been in continuous production for 60 years and has been handmade in Britain since 1963, and is still made today by Mathmos in Poole. The Mathmos lava lamp formula developed initially by Craven Walker in the 1960s and then improved with his help in the 1990s is still used. Mathmos celebrated its 50th anniversary in 2013.

== Naturism ==
Walker was a member of Spielplatz naturist camp in the 1950s. It was routinely described as Naturism's Ambassador. He set up his own naturist resort at Matchams, near Ringwood, known as the Bournemouth and District Outdoor Club (BDOC). The camp closed in 2000 after Craven's death.

== Film work ==
Craven combined film with naturism. In the 1950s/60s, nudity in film was taboo, but he evaded censors by not showing pubic hair. As a result, he became a pioneer in this genre. Under the pseudonym Michael Keatering, Craven directed the naturist film Travelling Light (1959). This was the first naturist film to receive public release in the UK. Described as an underwater ballet, it was shot off Corsica and released in 1960. He later produced Sunswept (1961) and Eves on Skis (1963). He lost a lot of his film archive when a tree fell on the garage in which it was stored while he was away at his apartment in Costa Natura, a naturist resort in Estepona, Spain.

== Death ==
Toward the end of the 1990s, Craven suffered from cancer. He died in Hampshire in 2000, aged 82, and was buried in a small cemetery in the New Forest.
