= Made in Britain (campaign) =

Non-profit organization

Made in Britain is a not-for-profit organisation that supports British manufacturers with a registered collective trade mark system, as a country of origin identifier to help identify and verify the geographic provenance of the goods they make in the UK. The mark also aims to represent a standard of unity for British manufacturing sectors and aims to promote them together, with social and other media visibility in the UK and around the world. The organisation works collaboratively with other UK trade bodies, government departments and other groups that support skilled jobs, responsible business and sustainable manufacturing growth. It campaigns strategically all year round to promote British manufacturing.

== History ==
Made in Britain's genesis was as a commercial marketing & PR campaign in 2011 to design a logo for manufacturers. The winner was Cynthia Lee, a student designer from the University of Nottingham. On 11 July 2011, a design was unveiled and British businesses were invited to apply to use the logo for the first time. After receiving support from the Labour Party and with over 600 members on board, a new Made in Britain mark was finalised in June 2013 and Made in Britain was officially launched as an independent, non-profit organisation in December 2013.

== Organisation ==
To join the organisation, businesses must become licence holding members of Made in Britain. To prove their eligibility, companies must be transparent in their claims and display supporting information about their manufacturing process and policies. Members are organised into tiers depending on the annual turnover of the organisation that will be using the trademark. Made in Britain aims to unite, support, promote and represent British manufacturing sectors and achieve more visibility for the mark. The website serves the general public as a look-up directory for British-made goods. Members also post their own news stories under strict regulations and the compulsory Made in Britain Code of Conduct.
