= Peter Pitt =

British film editor (1927–2020)

Peter Desmond Pitt (22 July 1927 – 2020) was a British film editor. He was born in Hendon, England. Pitt later lived in Dumfries, Scotland, where he died in 2020, at the age of 92.

== Selected filmography ==
- The Hostage (1956)
- Port of Escape (1956)
- Face in the Night (1957)
- Naked Fury (1959)
- Make Mine a Million (1959)
- The Gentle Trap (1960)
- Operation Cupid (1960)
- Three Spare Wives (1962)
- The Spanish Sword (1962)
- The Haunted House of Horror (1969)
- A Warm December (1970)
- Secrets of a Superstud (1976)
