= Michael Allaby =

English writer and actor (1933–2025)

- Born: John Michael Allaby; 18 September 1933; Belper, Derbyshire, England
- Died: 4 May 2025 (aged 91); Dunoon, Argyll and Bute, Scotland
- Occupation(s): Writer, actor

John Michael Allaby (18 September 1933 – 4 May 2025) was a British author and actor. He was the Aventis Junior prize-winner.

== Life and career ==
Allaby was born in Belper, Derbyshire, England on 18 September 1933.

He was a police cadet from 1949 to 1951. After that he served in the RAF from 1951 to 1954, becoming a pilot. After leaving the RAF, he worked as an actor from 1954 to 1964, including the Doctor Who serial The Keys of Marinus in which he appeared as an Ice soldier and Larn. He married Marthe McGregor on 3 January 1957.

From 1964 to 1972, Allaby worked as an editor for the Soil Association in Suffolk, England, editing Span magazine from 1967 to 1972. He was a member of the board of directors for Ecosystems Ltd. in Wadebridge, Cornwall, England and was an associate editor of Ecologist from 1970 to 1972. He became a managing editor in 1972. In 1973, he became a freelance writer.

He wrote widely about science, particularly about ecology and weather. He edited and wrote dictionaries and encyclopaedias for Macmillan Publishers and Oxford University Press. He co-authored two books with James Lovelock: The Greening of Mars (1984, Warner Books, ISBN 0-446-32967-3) and Great Extinction (1983, Doubleday, ISBN 0-385-18011-X). His book, The Food Chain (André Deutsch, ISBN 0-233-97681-7) was runner-up for the Times Educational Supplement Information Book Award in 1984. The New York Public Library chose Dangerous Weather: Hurricanes as one of its books for the Teen Age in 1998. He won the Aventis Junior Prize for Science Books in 2001 for How the Weather Works. He was a member of the Society for the History of Natural History, the Planetary Society, the Society of Authors, the New York Academy of Sciences, and the Association of British Science Writers.

Allaby died on 4 May 2025, at the age of 91.

== Sources ==
- Contemporary Authors Online, Gale, 2008. Reproduced in Biography Resource Center. Farmington Hills, Mich.: Gale, 2008. Document Number: H1000001310. Online 29 July 2008.
