= Bruce Montague =

British actor (1939–2022)

- Born: Bruce Alexander Montague; 24 March 1939; Deal, Kent, England
- Died: 16 August 2022 (aged 83)
- Occupation: Actor
- Years active: 1963–2019
- Spouse: Barbara Latham (m. 1962; died 2022)
- Children: 3
- Website: brucemontague.com

Bruce Alexander Montague (24 March 1939 – 16 August 2022) was a British actor, best known for his role as Leonard Dunn in the television sitcom Butterflies. He also acted in over 300 television productions – one of his earliest being in the 1965 sci-fi drama Undermind. In 2000, he guest-starred in the Doctor Who audio adventure The Genocide Machine and, in the following year, he starred alongside Paul McGann in the Doctor Who story Sword of Orion. In 2015, he appeared as a guest role in Hollyoaks as Derek Clough.

== Life and career ==
Montague played Mr. Brownlow in Oliver! directed by Sam Mendes at the London Palladium for 3 years. He played in Phantom of the Opera directed by Hal Prince at Her Majesty's Theatre for 2 years. He starred as Abner Dillon in a UK tour of 42nd Street. He would later reprise his role in the 2017 West End revival. He guest-starred in "Wild Justice", a 2013 episode of New Tricks. In that episode was Nicholas Lyndhurst, one of his fellow cast members from Butterflies.

In 2015, he starred in Casa Valentina by Harvey Fierstein. In October 2019, he appeared in an episode of Doctors alongside former Butterflies co-star Wendy Craig.

== Personal life ==
Montague lived in Hove with his wife, actress and novelist, Barbara Latham. They were married from 1962 until her death in April 2022, and had three children.

Between 1969 and 1971, he and his wife spent time in New Zealand and Australia, where he costarred in a couple of short-lived local productions and did voice acting for animated children's films of classic tales.

Montague died from cancer on 16 August 2022, at the age of 83.

== Filmography ==
Year	Title	Role	Notes
1963	80,000 Suspects	Brooks	Uncredited
1976	Sextet	Jonathan	
1980	George and Mildred	Spanish Businessman	
1988	Olympus Force: The Key	Captain of the Yacht	
1995	Keeping Up Appearances, S5E6	Lord of the Stately House	
