= Ghost Squad (TV series) =

British TV crime drama series (1961–1964)

- Also known as: GS5
- Created by: John Gosling; Anthony Kearey
- Starring: Michael Quinn; Donald Wolfit; Angela Browne; Anthony Marlowe; Neil Hallett; Claire Nielson; Ray Austin
- Composer: Philip Green
- Country of origin: United Kingdom
- No. of series: 3
- No. of episodes: 52 (13 missing)

Production
- Running time: 50 minutes
- Production company: ITC Entertainment for ATV

Original release
- Network: ITV
- Release: 9 September 1961 – 6 June 1964

Ghost Squad, known as GS5 for its third series, is a British crime drama series that ran between 1961 and 1964, about an elite division of Scotland Yard. In each episode the Ghost Squad would investigate cases that fell outside the scope of normal police work. Despite the show and characters being fictional, an actual division did exist within the Metropolitan Police at the time.

Inspiration for the series was taken from a book of the same title written by John Gosling, a retired police officer and former member of the real-life squad it is based on. This squad operated only in London, but the members of the fictional team travel all over Europe, sometimes to fictitious countries. As was common practice at the time, most of the foreign settings are depicted by combining stock footage with scenes shot on sets, in this case at Independent Artists Studios at Beaconsfield and Associated British Elstree Studios. The music for the show was by Philip Green.

The show was produced by ITC Entertainment with Rank Organisation TV and ATV. It was the first ITC show filmed to fit the one-hour time-slot (with two advertisement breaks), setting the trend for the majority of ITC's output. Another common ITC trait was to feature an American actor, in this case Michael Quinn, in a leading role, in the hope of increasing the chances of international sales. In the second series Neil Hallett sometimes replaced Quinn and in the third series Quinn was entirely replaced by the Australian actor Ray Barrett. Ray Austin, stunt director for the entire series, played Billy Clay in the third series (he went on to become a TV director in Hollywood and the UK).

== Cast ==
- Michael Quinn as Nick Craig, Canadian squad operator (Series 1, 2)
- Neil Hallett as Tony Miller, squad operator (Series 2, 3)
- Donald Wolfit as Sir Andrew Wilson, squad chief (Series 1)
- Angela Browne as Helen Winters, Wilson's secretary/executive assistant (Series 1)
- Anthony Marlowe as Geoffrey Stock, squad chief in most episodes of Series 2 and 3
- Claire Nielson as Jean (Porridge) Carter, Stock's Scottish secretary (Series 2, 3)
- Patricia Mort as Sally Lomax, squad operator (Series 2, 3)
- Ray Barrett as Peter Clarke (Series 3)
- Ray Austin as Billy Clay (Series 3) – Austin was also Stunt Director on all series

== Episodes ==
The show was produced for three consecutive series. The Rank Organisation co-produced the first series, which was shot on 35 mm film. Subsequent series were made on videotape in a multi-camera television studio with filmed location inserts, with telerecordings being made for overseas sales. Series two survives complete in this form, but no complete episode survives from series three when the show had been renamed as GS5.

In most ITV regions the first ten episodes of the first series (actually episodes 1 to 9 plus episode 13, in random order) were shown from 9 September to 11 November 1961, the remaining three episodes (11, 10 and 12) being shown at the start of the second series, from 30 September to 14 October 1962, followed by the second series proper from 21 October 1962 to 27 April 1963 (though no episodes were shown on 4 November or 30 December). Other ITV regions, including TWW and Tyne Tees, showed the different seasons as 13, 26 and 13 episodes.

Series	Premiere	Finale	Episodes
Series One	9 September 1961	11 November 1961	10
Series Two	30 September 1962	27 April 1963	29
Series Three	22 February 1964	6 June 1964	13

== Series one ==
1. Hong Kong Story: A man is murdered so Craig gets a job as air crew to get inside a ring of smugglers, smuggling gold from Hong Kong to Karachi. Also features Bill Kerr, George Pastell and Leonard Sachs.

2. Bullet with my Name on it: An American lawyer in Rome is the next target of Murder, Inc. Craig takes his place as the assassin's next victim. Also features Alfred Burke, Philip Ray and Richard Shaw.

3. Ticket for Blackmail: An exclusive tour of France run by two brothers is a front for a con game, blackmail and murder. When Craig is in trouble with the French police, his boss denies knowledge of him. Also features Ronald Leigh-Hunt, Alex Scott, Donald Morley and Edwin Richfield.

4. Broken Doll: Five blonde girls are murdered in Marseilles. Julie Peters (Julia Arnall) is sent to investigate as she fits the profile of the victims. She gets a job as singer with the creepy Sergie Federoff (Simon Lack) who makes dolls of his favourites. Odd that the Marseilles police did not recognise Craig from his adventure there in the previous episode. Also features Richard Leech and Harry Locke.

5. High Wire: A wave of bank robberies across Western Europe and a circus playing nearby each time leads Craig to get a job with them after saving the boss's (William Hartnell) life. Rice, the boss worked with Wilson in Special Ops in WWII. Hartnell with no stand-in got very wet doing underwater escapes in this show. Also features John Cairney, Tom Adams and André Maranne.

6. Eyes of the Bat: Jerome (William Lucas) and his gang steal secrets and then blackmail companies and even countries who want them back. Craig joins the organisation as The Bat, a well-known safecracker. Also features Lionel Murton, Edward Judd and Dudley Foster.

7. Still Waters: The jewels from a series of robberies around the world are known to be sent to Amsterdam to be recut before being sold on. Craig joins the organisation as a diamond cutter. Also features John Carson and Stratford Johns.

8. Assassin: The Prime Minister of a small Eastern European country is murdered and an American man is framed for his death in a plot to get the Communists to win power there. Also features Jill Ireland, Joseph Fürst, George Coulouris, Paul Maxwell and Norman Bird.

9. Million Dollar Ransom: Dr Cookson, who is working on a new anti-missile system is kidnapped in Stockholm for a large ransom with the threat of handing him over to the Russians if the money is not paid. The 1961 Monte Carlo Rally (actual footage shown) is used to smuggle Cookson to Switzerland. Also features Bruce Beeby, Peter Dyneley, Jennifer Jayne, Olaf Pooley, Keith Pyott and Jenny Laird.

10. Catspaw: In the small South American country of Sebasiana, the men under the President plot to frame him for theft of the country's funds followed by his death. Craig has worked for Ghost Squad for eight years. Also features Paul Stassino, Michael Goodliffe, Alec Mango, George Pastell and Brian Blessed.

11. The Green Shoes: A small bar of radioactive material which can help make a neutron bomb is stolen and smuggled to Warsaw inside a ballet shoe. One man has already died from the radioactivity and Craig rushes to Warsaw to stop a ballerina who is to wear the shoe, from suffering the same fate. Also features Ewen Solon, Glyn Houston, Neil McCarthy and Martin Miller.

12. Princess: Assassins are trying to kill a Middle-Eastern princess to stop a marriage that will help the West keep its supply of oil. Things don't go well for Craig or for the assassins. Also features Barbara Evans, Honor Blackman, Robert Rietti and Warren Mitchell.

13. Death from a Distance: Craig is given 2 weeks' vacation and leaves. Stephen Brett (William Sylvester), a Scotland Yard man with international experience handles this case. Hazel Court as Jackie is his GS contact. Balkans ruler Volgu (John Le Mesurier) is coming to London for a conference. 4 men who would like him dead are lured by GS to a small island but 2 escape to plot Volgu's death. Also features Roger Delgado, Douglas Wilmer and Anton Diffring.

== Series two ==
14. Interrupted Requiem: Sir Andrew has left for the Foreign Office and Geoffrey Stock is now in charge. A defector vital to rocket research is blackmailed into sabotaging it by threats against his daughter in a small Eastern European country (Ordania). Craig goes there as a toy salesman to try and rescue her. Also features Leonard Sachs, Frederick Peisley, Derek Nimmo and John Barrett.

15. East of Mandalay: After being unable to get holidays in the earlier episodes, Craig is off on another 2-week holiday, allowing Tony Miller (Neil Hallett) to take the case. In the Far East country of Sylon, the British Eastern company is suspected of helping the rebels who want to overthrow the government and Miller must get evidence of this. Also features Ian Fleming and Wolfe Morris.

16. Sentences of Death: Craig is drugged and forced to reveal important information. The people want £40,000 or they will sell the information on. Also features Ronald Leigh-Hunt, Ann Lynn, Bernard Spear, Reg Lye and John Boyd-Brent.

17. The Golden Silence: No mention of Craig and Mike Ferrers (Gordon Jackson) is boss. A GS operative is killed chasing gold smugglers so Tony Miller (who lives at 17, Hawthorne Mews, S.W.3.) tries to join their organisation but is almost immediately suspected. Bad guy Max Leach (David Lodge) continually calls every man "darling" and "love". Also features David Garth.

18. The Retirement of the Gentle Dove: Gentle Dove was the code name of a double agent working for the Allies in 1943 but he switched sides and many spies for the Allies were executed. The then head of British Intelligence set about finding him and eventually tracked him down to a retirement home, where he was murdered. A disguised Geoffrey Stock (Boss of GS) goes there undercover with Craig outside, to find Gentle Dove. Also features Ballard Berkeley and Philip Ray.

19. The Missing People: A violent gang of people smugglers have killed a GS operative. Miller infiltrates the gang who charge Polish people £1,000 a time, then drop them into the sea. Also features Nigel Green, Willoughby Goddard, Pamela Ann Davy, Hana Maria Pravda, Rio Fanning, Peter Fraser and Glyn Dearman.

20. Lost in Transit: A murderous band of fanatics under Van Tempel (Anthony Jacobs) want to take over the world. GS has a man inside their organisation but they spot him. Tony Miller has to stop them from letting off a large bomb at the Opera. Also features John Woodvine, André Maranne, Jeremy Young, Arnold Diamond, Walter Randall, John Scott Martin, Anthony Jacobs, Brian Vaughan and Wilfred Carter.

21. The Man with the Delicate Hands: A man is burned to death in an apparent car accident but his sister knows it is not the man claimed because the body does not have delicate hands. Her brother is being tortured nearby to get information that can be used on Insider trading to make money on planned currency devaluations. Boss Henry Dickinson (Basil Dignam) sends Miller on the case. Also features Derek Francis, Erik Chitty and Keith Marsh.

22. Hot Money: An obviously counterfeit pound note leads Craig on the trail of a quarter of a million pounds of stolen money, thanks to Geoffrey Stock. Also features Lloyd Lamble, Samantha Eggar and Michael Coles.

23. The Grand Duchess: The name of a Goya painting on loan to a London museum. Miller joins a gang intent on stealing it to find the gang's mastermind. When they steal it, they find someone else has beaten them to it and all they have is a fake. Also features John Barron, Garfield Morgan, Colin Douglas, William Gaunt, Michael Robbins, John Ringham, Clifford Cox and Roger Avon.

24. A First Class Way to Die: Craig is on a cruise to Dubrovnik to protect an important scientist on holiday. It is not long before the first murder occurs then a second, both of which are tied up with The Condor, a criminal. Tony Miller turns up at the end and meets Craig. Also features Peter Dyneley, Peter Halliday, Jennifer Daniel, Keith Anderson and Charles Morgan.

25. Quarantine at Kavar: Valuable thorium is believed to have been found in a small desert kingdom. Craig, helped by Jean Carter is thwarted at every step by the Emir who wants to keep his kingdom isolated to protect his power. Also features Maurice Kaufmann, Roger Delgado, Martin Wyldeck, Elvi Hale, Patrick Carter, Dallas Cavell and Julian Sherrier.

26. The Desperate Diplomat: Craig and Geoffrey Stock investigate with the help of a safecracker (Tom Bowman) when the wife of a diplomat is not just a user but is also smuggling heroin into the country. Also features Ferdy Mayne, Richard Caldicot, Barbara Shelley, Ivor Salter and Tom Bowman.

27. The Big Time: A tramp (Paul Farrell) steals a purse containing £70,000 in uncut diamonds, spoiling the work of Craig and others who were waiting for it to be handed over so they could arrest the smugglers. Craig has to track him down before the gang gets to him. Also features Vincent Ball, Geoffrey Chater, George Murcell, Derek Waring, Henry McGee and Dennis Edwards.

28. The Last Jump: Miller and Stock join a parachute regiment where someone is killing paras and using its West Germany jumps to pass equipment to East Germany. Miller calls Carter: "Porridge" 3 times. Also features Jack Watling.

29. Escape Route: A rich swindler in London turns up as a dead tramp in Sydney. Not the first rich swindler to have vanished just ahead of the police so Craig poses as one and is taken on the escape route, being systematically swindled along the way. Also features Hugh Burden, Terence Alexander, John Junkin, Alan White and Steven Scott.

30. Mr Five Per Cent: Smuggled guns are causing tension between Russia and America. Miller has to work with someone (Guy Deghy) who has spent his life making shady deals and living on the suffering of others to crack this case. Also features Edwin Richfield and William Marlowe.

31. The Heir Apparent: A playboy prince from a Middle Eastern country comes to an English college. Craig not very successfully keeps his eye on him as a games master, as his uncle (Roger Delgado) tries to kill him. Also features Frank Middlemass, Arnold Diamond, David Blake Kelly and Julian Sherrier.

32. Death of a Sportsman: Miller who is working with a female operative (Patricia Mort) in Cairo, trying to stop a diamond smuggling operation believes a man he had thought dead (John Longden) may be part of it. Miller is recognised as a policeman who won a judo competition ten years ago. Also features Martin Benson, Warren Mitchell, Noel Howlett, Peter Diamond and Arnold Yarrow.

33. P. G. 7: A pacifist working for the government makes Paralyzing Gas 7. It makes test mice fall asleep for a few hours then wake up without any ill effects so he wants every country to have it to stop wars. He agrees to sell it to some unscrupulous people not knowing that if it is used on (monkeys or) humans it will kill them painfully after they revive. Also features George Pastell, Alister Williamson, Frank Gatliff and Derek Sydney.

34. Polsky: A political group pull robberies across France to fund their anarchy then move to the UK, using and discarding people as they go. Miller pretends to be a Polish locksmith in trouble with the law, so is picked up by them (they nickname him Polsky). To get at the headman, Miller causes trouble, which puts him in deadly danger. Craig puts in an appearance at the office. Also features Ray Barrett, Gerald Cross, Frederick Schiller, Fernanda Marlowe, Tom Bowman and Alec Ross.

35. The Magic Bullet: The car brake pipes of a scientist working on nuclear weapon research are cut, resulting in his death. Craig becomes a scientist and with help from Jean Carter tries to find the person responsible. Also features David Markham, Mary Morris and Norman Claridge.

36. The Menacing Mazurka: Miller is a publicity agent to keep an eye on the (Moscow) Bassrai State Dancers visit to London. A dancer wants to defect but Miller is suspicious of her. The visit is being used to try and return a Colonel (George Pravda) who defected to Britain years earlier. Also features Jacqueline Ellis, Olaf Pooley, Harry Towb and Rex Robinson.

37. Gertrude: Craig struggles in a comedy of errors to take a female spy and her plans of a Middle East anti-British uprising to England. However, Gertrude (Mary MacKenzie) is self-centred, untrustworthy and nothing but trouble to all around her as Atarah agents and the police close in. End titles have bagpipe music. Also features Archie Duncan, Douglas Wilmer, Richard Caldicot, Henry Lincoln, Raf De La Torre and Steve Plytas.

38. The Thirteenth Girl: Neither Craig nor Miller appeared in this. Sally Lomax (Patricia Mort) is sent undercover to find what has happened to 12 au pairs, who have vanished, one having recently turned up dead. Also features John Carson, Simon Oates, Molly Weir, Margaret John and Peter Diamond.

39. Sabotage: Miller takes the place of a Dutch saboteur out to blow up a port installation in the Fillemore Islands, which are about to gain independence from Britain. Also features Eric Pohlmann, John Paul, Jill Melford and Maurice Colbourne.

== Series three ==
40. An Eye for an Eye: Also features Ken Parry, Fredric Abbott and William Marlowe.

41. A Cast of Thousands: Also features Steven Berkoff, Richard Easton, Edwin Richfield and George Pravda.

42. Death of a Cop: Also features Roger Delgado, Robert Brown, Arnold Diamond, Barry Wilsher and Sydney Arnold.

43. Party for Murder: Also features Lois Maxwell, Barry Letts, Michael Mellinger and Lary Taylor.

44. Dead Men Don't Drive: Also features Zena Marshall, Geoffrey Chater, Colin Douglas, Ronald Leigh-Hunt and Kenneth Watson.

45. Pay Up or Else: Also features Harry Towb, Felix Felton, Toni Palmer, Alan Browning and John Barrard.

46. Dr. Ayre: Also features Garfield Morgan, Freddie Earlle and Dennis Edwards.

47. Scorpion Rock: Also features Paul Whitsun-Jones, Walter Randall, Michael Robbins and Arthur Hewlett.

48. The Goldfish Bowl: Also features Gerald Sim, Talfryn Thomas and Don McKillop.

49. Seven Sisters of Wong: Also features Reed De Rouen, Donald Morley, Shane Rimmer and Leonard Sachs.

50. Rich Ruby Wine: Also features Geoffrey Bayldon, Harold Goldblatt and Tutte Lemkow.

51. Hideout: Also features Emrys Jones, Edward Burnham, John Boyd-Brent and David Blake Kelly.

52. It Won't Be a Stylish Marriage: Also features George A. Cooper, Carl Duering and David Garth.

== Availability ==
The series has not been broadcast since the 1960s. The 39 surviving episodes are available in a 10-disc DVD set from Network.
