= House of Mystery (1961 film) =

British supernatural mystery by Vernon Sewell

- Directed by: Vernon Sewell
- Screenplay by: Vernon Sewell
- Based on: play L'Angoisse by Celia de Vilyars and Pierre Mills
- Produced by: Leslie Parkyn; Julian Wintle
- Starring: Jane Hylton; Peter Dyneley; Nanette Newman; Maurice Kaufmann; Colin Gordon
- Cinematography: Ernest Steward
- Edited by: John Trumper
- Music by: Stanley Black
- Production company: Independent Artists
- Distributed by: Anglo-Amalgamated Film Distributors (UK)
- Release date: April 1961 (UK)
- Running time: 56 minutes
- Country: UK
- Language: English

House of Mystery (also known as Das Landhaus des Dr. Lemming) is a 1961 British supernatural mystery film directed by Vernon Sewell and starring Jane Hylton, Peter Dyneley and Nanette Newman. It was based on the play The Medium which Sewell had filmed three times before. It aired in the U.S. as an episode of the TV series Kraft Mystery Theatre.

== Plot ==
A pair of newlyweds visit an old cottage for sale in the country, and hear the housekeeper's account of its macabre history. The previous owners had been disturbed by paranormal activity, and on calling in a medium, the ghost was identified as an eccentric and vengeful scientist, once resident in the cottage. The scientist was obsessed with electricity, and when his unfaithful wife and her lover attempted to murder him, he responded by electrifying the living room floor and fixtures, and challenging the couple to escape.

== Cast ==
- Jane Hylton as Stella Lemming
- Peter Dyneley as Mark Lemming
- Nanette Newman as Joan Trevor
- Maurice Kaufmann as Henry Trevor
- Colin Gordon as Burdon
- John Merivale as Clive
- Ronald Hines as young husband
- Colette Wilde as young wife
- Molly Urquhart as Mrs Bucknall
- George Selway as constable
- John Abineri as shop assistant

== Critical reception ==
The Monthly Film Bulletin wrote: "Though far less stylish in presentation than another of Vernon Sewell's grand guignol exercises, Latin Quarter, this is nonetheless a gripping little film, with a fairly unusual plot and some good touches – mainly in the séance, nicely underplayed by Colin Gordon and Molly Urquhart, and in its revelation, made visual, of the murders. Not all the pitfalls of the flashback device have been avoided, so that there are occasional longueurs, and one or two of the supporting performances are weak. But in the main the narrative is ingeniously worked out, giving full credit to the supernatural, and is full of satisfying yet unsensational surprises."

The Radio Times gave the film three out of five stars, saying, "this is a neat little spine-tingler from writer/director Vernon Sewell" with "plenty of uneasy moments". Britmovie called the film an "effectively macabre little b-movie narrated in several multi-layered flashbacks."
