= Jean Redon =

French screenwriter

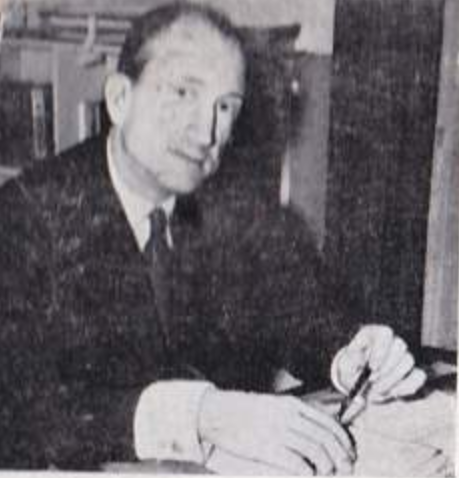
- Died: December 26, 1984
- Citizenship: French Republic
- Occupations: Writer, screenwriter
- Writing career
- Years active: 1952–1962
- Notable work: Les Yeux sans Visage

Jean Redon was a French writer, screenwriter, and press agent for the French office of Warner Bros. He is best known for his 1959 novel Les Yeux sans Visage, which was adapted as a film in 1960 by French filmmaker Georges Franju.

== Personal life ==
Jean Redon kept his family and personal life very private. Not much is known about him other than his transition from journalism to working in French cinema. He died on December 26, 1984.

== Works ==
This filmography represents Redon's verified screen credits and may not be complete.

In Film
| Year | Title | Credit | Notes |
|---|---|---|---|
| 1952 | A Dog in the Blues | Screenplay, Dialogue | Short film directed by Marcel Aboulker |
| 1956 | Fernand Cow-boy | Writer | |
| 1957 | Immediate Action | Dialogue | |
| 1957 | Like a Hair in the Soup | Scenario, Adaptation, Dialogue | |
| 1958 | Back to the Wall | Adaptation | |
| 1959 | The Beast is Unleashed | Writer | |
| 1959 | The Tiger Attacks | Scenario, Dialogue | |
| 1960 | Eyes Without a Face | Novel, Adaptation | Based on his 1959 novel of the same name. |
| 1962 | Conduite à gauche | Screenplay | |

In Literature
| Title | Year | Version | Notes |
|---|---|---|---|
| Les Yeux sans Visage (Français) / Eyes Without a Face (English) | 1959 | 1st Edition (Flueve Noir Angoisse) | Comics Pocket published a comic adaptation in December 1979, and later a paperback edition was published by Fleuve Noir on April 1, 1989, but no translations or further reprints have been made. |
| Les Yeux sans Visage (Français) / Eyes Without a Face (English) | December 1979 | Comic Adaptation (Comics Pocket) | Comics Pocket published a comic adaptation in December 1979, and later a paperback edition was published by Fleuve Noir on April 1, 1989, but no translations or further reprints have been made. |
| Les Yeux sans Visage (Français) / Eyes Without a Face (English) | April 1, 1989 | 2nd Edition (Flueve Noir Polar 50) | Comics Pocket published a comic adaptation in December 1979, and later a paperback edition was published by Fleuve Noir on April 1, 1989, but no translations or further reprints have been made. |

== Eyes Without a Face ==
Jean Redon's most notable work is his 1959 novel, Les Yeux sans Visage (Eyes Without a Face), which was the source material for the landmark 1960 French horror film of the same name directed by Georges Franju. The plot follows a plastic surgeon, Dr. Génessier, who kidnaps and murders young girls for their face, which he attempts to surgically transplant onto his daughter's disfigured face after a car crash. Redon's novel was first published in 1959 by Fleuve Noir as part of their "Angoisse" collection, which specialized in fantasy and horror. The novel was Pulp fiction, meaning it was cheaply printed and wasn't meant to stay in print for long. The novel received the publication of a comic strip adaptation, Hallucinations No. 54, in the "Comics Pocket" collection in 1975. A paperback edition was reissued in April 1989 by Flueve Noir, in the Polar 50 Collection under No. 18, featuring a front cover illustrated by Michel Gourdon. No translations or further reprints have been made, making the different versions a rare find available only through private collections or sales.

=== Possible pen name ===
The back cover of Redon's novel features a highly laudatory blurb by the prolific French author Frédéric Dard, which reads:

It's not unusual for a young man who has held such varied and colorful jobs to one day become a journalist. It's less common for a journalist who has dabbled in every section (including the one about dead dogs) to dedicate himself to advertising for a major American company...It's exceptional for an advertising executive to become a fashionable screenwriter and produce, with astonishing eclecticism...But it's even more extraordinary to see a screenwriter take up the novel and, on his first attempt, write a thriller of this caliber. This young man is too enamored with the extreme to begin a writing career with a noir novel. He has therefore gone straight to the literature of tomorrow: the crime novel.

— Frédéric Dard

This created speculation about whether or not Dard had ghost-written or wrote it under Redon's name, which he had done before, congratulating himself on previous works like En même défense, published under the pseudonym André Berthomieu, and again for 4:30 chez Belzébuth, published under the name Marcel-G. Prêtre.

=== Content Changes ===
Georges Franju reportedly found the original novel "too dumb for words," describing it as a pulpy narrative where the doctor was a drunkard, and his assistant a necrophiliac who raped corpses. To elevate the story, the film's producers brought in the renowned writing team Boileau-Narcejac to rewrite the script, making drastic changes, adding psychological depth, and removing the more "controversial" elements present in the original.

The film's US Release on March 28, 1962 was edited and dubbed into English, and retitled The Horror Chamber of Dr. Faustus, despite not having any character of that name. The edit was marketed as an exploitation film as part of a double bill alongside the monster flick The Manster, removing scenes showing Doctor Génessier in a more sympathetic light, as well as parts of violent scenes.

=== Legacy ===
The film adaptation of Redon's novel influenced modern horror and gothic cinema, as well as inspiring John Carpenter for his 1978 horror film Halloween; a 1984 single by Billy Idol, who described in his memoir that he had been fascinated with old black and white horror films, one being Eyes Without a Face, in which he saw some parallel between the film and the moral decay he had experienced living in New York City in the 1980s; and Pedro Almodóvar’s The Skin I Live In (2011), which follows a similar plot of a plastic surgeon and a woman he performs operations on.

== Sources ==
- Ashby, Justine; Higson, Andrew (2000). British Cinema: Past and Present. Routledge. ISBN 978-0-415-22061-3
- Ince, Kate (2005). Georges Franju. Manchester University Press. ISBN 978-0-7190-6828-7
- Idol, Billy (2014). Dancing with Myself. New York: Touchstone. ISBN 978-1-4516-2850-0.
