= Peter Dyneley =

British-Canadian actor (1921–1977)

- Dyneley in 1975
- Born: 13 April 1921; Hastings, Sussex, England
- Died: 19 August 1977 (aged 56); London, England
- Education: Radley College; McGill University; Guildhall School of Music and Drama
- Occupations: Actor, singer
- Years active: 1954–1977
- Television: Thunderbirds (1965–66)
- Spouse(s): Christine May (divorced) Jane Hylton (m. 1956)
- Children: 2
- Military career
- Allegiance: Canada
- Branch: Royal Canadian Navy
- Conflicts: World War II

Peter Dyneley (13 April 1921 – 19 August 1977) was an English and Canadian actor and bass. Although he appeared in many minor and supporting parts in both film and television, he is best remembered for supplying the voice of Jeff Tracy for the 1960s "Supermarionation" television series Thunderbirds and its two film spinoffs, Thunderbirds Are Go (1966) and Thunderbird 6 (1968), all produced by Gerry Anderson. Dyneley also provided the voice of the countdown that introduces the Thunderbirds title sequence.

== Early life and education ==
Born in Hastings, Sussex on 13 April 1921, Dyneley spent his early years in Canada but was educated at Radley College in Oxfordshire, UK. He enrolled in McGill University, but his studies were interrupted by the outbreak of the Second World War, and Dyneley enlisted in the Royal Canadian Navy. After the war, he attended the Guildhall School of Music and Drama in London, where he studied opera and developed his bass voice.

== Career ==
Thanks to his Canadian upbringing, Dyneley frequently performed with a North American accent. He acted primarily in stage productions prior to 1954, including a Broadway revival of George Bernard Shaw's The Millionairess, when he turned his attention to film.

On stage and in film, he regularly appeared opposite his second wife, the actress Jane Hylton. He also appeared as a guest star in many television series.

=== Thunderbirds voice-over ===
English actor Brian Cobby claimed he had provided the voice-over for the opening sequence countdown of Thunderbirds in 1964. This was refuted by Thunderbirds producer Gerry Anderson, who confirmed the countdown was indeed recorded by Dyneley.

Dyneley's countdown was reused in the first trailer for the series' 2015 reboot Thunderbirds Are Go!, as well as its opening sequence, and also for the launch countdown for the various Thunderbirds in the episodes, and also for the track "Thunderbirds 2.0" on Busted's Greatest Hits 2.0 album with or without their longtime friends McFly.

== Personal life ==
Dyneley married his Guildhall classmate Christine May, with whom he had two children, Richard and Amanda. They later divorced, and Dyneley remarried to actress Jane Hylton, Laughing in the Sunshine, in 1956. They also co-starred together in The Manster in 1959.

He spoke fluent French, German and Spanish.

=== Death ===
Dyneley died of cancer in London on 19 August 1977, at age 56. His wife Jane died of a heart attack 18 months later, on 28 February 1979.

== Filmography ==
=== Film ===
- Hell Below Zero (1954) as Miller
- You Know What Sailors Are (1954) as Lieutenant Andrews
- The Young Lovers (1954) as Regan (uncredited)
- Beau Brummell (1954) as Midger
- Third Party Risk (1954) as Tony Roscoe
- The Stolen Airliner (1955) as Uncle George
- Laughing in the Sunshine (1956) as Greg Preston
- The Battle of the River Plate (1956) as Captain, Newton Beach, Prisoner on Graf Spee (uncredited)
- The Golden Disc (1958) as Mr Washington
- The Strange Awakening (1958) as Dr Rene Normand
- The Whole Truth (1958) as Willy Reichel
- Deadly Record (1959) as Dr. Morrow
- The Manster (1959) as Larry Stanford
- Sink the Bismarck! (1960) as Commander Jenkins (uncredited)
- October Moth (1960) as Tom
- House of Mystery (1961) as Mark Lemming
- The Roman Spring of Mrs. Stone (1961) as Lloyd Greener
- The Day of the Triffids (1962) Narrator, Parisian Radio Operator (voice, uncredited)
- Call Me Bwana (1963) as Williams
- Thunderbirds Are Go (1966) as Jeff Tracy (voice)
- Thunderbird 6 (1968) as Jeff Tracy (voice)
- The Executioner (1970) as Balkov
- Chato's Land (1972) as Ezra Meade
- Royal Sovereign Light (1972) Documentary Narrator
- Death of a Snowman (1976) as Captain

=== Television ===
- Fabian of the Yard (1954, 1 episode) as Captain Pool
- Colonel March of Scotland Yard (1954) (1 episode) as Red
- The Vise (1955, 1 episode)
- Portrait of Alison (1955, 5 episodes) as Henry Carmichael
- Douglas Fairbanks, Jr., Presents (1955, 2 episodes) as Bill Stevens/Mitch
- London Playhouse (1955, 1 episode) as John Bell
- The Adventures of Aggie (1956,1 episode) as Mike
- Sailor of Fortune (1956, 1 episode) as Darren
- The New Adventures of Charlie Chan (1957, 2 episodes) as Dr Paul Liggat/John Robey
- The Adventures of a Jungle Boy (1957, 1 episode) as Harold Gayland
- Assignment Foreign Legion (1957, 1 episode) as Richard Harding
- ITV Playhouse (1957, 1 episode) as Arthur Hayes
- Ivanhoe (1958, 1 episode) as Baron Mauray
- African Patrol (1958–1959, 3 episodes) as Landray/Robert Gibson
- Armchair Theatre (1958–1959, 4 episodes) as Lew Myrick
- The Flying Doctor (1959, 1 episode) as Jeff Ferguson
- Dial 999 (1959, 1 episode) as Harry Killian
- The Four Just Men (1959–1960, 2 episodes) as Dougan/Police Chief
- Interpol Calling (1960, 1 episode) as LeRoy
- Golden Girl (1960) as Joe Francis
- Alcoa Presents: One Step Beyond (1961, 1 episode) as Hadley
- International Detective (1961, 1 episode) as Len Rickman
- Drama 61-67 (1961–1964, 1 episode) as Frank Ellinger
- Ghost Squad (1961–1963, 2 episodes) as Arnell/Phil Slade
- ITV Play of the Week (1961–1964, 3 episodes) as Major Ritter/Pyotr Kirpichov/Sir Basil Fleming
- Out of This World (1962, 1 episode) as Inspector Slinn
- Man of the World (1962, 1 episode) as Tony Gardner
- Z-Cars (1962, 1 episode) as Jackey Simmons
- No Hiding Place (1962–1965, 2 episodes) as Cliff Davidson/Mr Brome
- The Saint (1962–1967, 3 episodes) as Nat Grindel/Paul Verrier/Richard Eade
- Sunday-Night Play (1963, 1 episode) as Mr Wright
- Maigret (1963, 1 episode) as Clark
- Espionage (1963, 1 episode) as Parrott
- Sergeant Cork (1964, 1 episode) as Field Marshal
- Catch Hand (1964, 1 episode) as Mr Niel
- Crane (1965, 1 episode) as Peter Garvey
- Thunderbirds (1965–1966, 32 episodes) as Jeff Tracy (voice)
- Kraft Mystery Theatre (2 episodes) as Dr Morrow/Mark Lemming
- Theatre 625 (1 episode) as Grantley Lewis
- Hereward the Wake (1965)
- The Mask of Janus (1965, 1 episode) as Commander Charles Hastings
- The Spies (1966, 1 episode) as Charles Hastings
- Graf Yoster (1970, 1 episode) as Lord Alistair Abdington
- Thriller (1974, 1 episode) as David Garrick
- The Goodies (1974, 1 episode – Clown Virus) as General
- Fall Of Eagles (1974, episode 7 – Dearest Nicky) as Von Bülow
- The Sweeney (1977, 1 episode) as Tarley
