= Light Up the Sky! (film) =

1960 British film by Lewis Gilbert

- British quad poster by Stevens
- Directed by: Lewis Gilbert
- Written by: Vernon Harris
- Based on: Play:Touch It Light by Robert Storey
- Produced by: Lewis Gilbert
- Starring: Ian Carmichael; Tommy Steele; Benny Hill
- Cinematography: John Wilcox
- Edited by: Peter Tanner
- Music by: Douglas Gamley
- Distributed by: Bryanston Films (UK); Continental Distributing (USA)
- Release date: 5 July 1960
- Running time: 90 mins.
- Country: United Kingdom
- Language: English
- Budget: £126,318

Light Up the Sky! (also known as Touch it Light; U.S. title: Skywatch) is a 1960 British comedy drama film directed by Lewis Gilbert and starring Ian Carmichael, Tommy Steele and Benny Hill. The film also features Dick Emery in a minor role.

Light Up the Sky! was based on Robert Storey's 1957 West End play Touch It Light.

== Plot ==
In 1942 during the Second World War, Lieutenant Ogleby is in command of a searchlight and anti-aircraft unit somewhere in England. Ogleby visits only occasionally to check up on the unit. In his absence Lance Bombardier Tomlinson is in charge, but he struggles to maintain some kind of order and he frequently turns a blind eye to the lack of discipline and even their local thieving.

Camp comic Syd McGaffey tries to keep up with the romantic antics of his younger brother Eric, who comes back from a short leave and announces that he has got married. He soon takes up with a local girl and gets her pregnant, falling foul of her father. Ted Green is a widower with a son serving overseas, and he eagerly maintains a correspondence with him. Leslie Smith is lovesick and unhappy over a misunderstanding with his girlfriend and eventually goes AWOL to get to see her. Roland Kenyon is the unit's cook and a father of six children. He has ambitions to get a posting to a catering unit.

One night, they illuminate a German airplane. The plane is hit and dives toward their searchlight. It overshoots and crashes, but Smith is killed while shooting at it.

== Cast ==
- Ian Carmichael as Lieutenant Ogleby
- Tommy Steele as Eric McGaffey
- Benny Hill as Syd McGaffey
- Sydney Tafler as Ted Green
- Victor Maddern as Lance Bombardier Tomlinson
- Harry Locke as Roland Kenyon
- Johnny Briggs as Leslie Smith
- Cyril Smith as 'Spinner' Rice
- Dick Emery as Harry
- Cardew Robinson as compere
- Susan Burnet as Jean
- Sheila Hancock as theatre act
- Fred Griffiths as Mr. Jennings

== Production ==
Light Up the Sky! was based on the play Touch It Light, which premiered in 1957. Producer and director Lewis Gilbert liked it and arranged for it to be filmed. "There have been countless films featuring heroic officers and I feel it is time the ordinary private is given his due," said Gilbert. (Note: Victor Maddern, Johnny Briggs and Harry Locke reprised their roles in the play.)

The film was developed by Eros Films but then that company decided not to make it after being taken over by Albert Broccoli and Irwin Allen. Gilbert instead arranged finance through Bryanston.

Light Up the Sky! was Tommy Steele's first dramatic role. Lionel Bart who wrote songs for Steele's first three films, wrote a song for this film called, "Touch It Light" which Steele performs with Hill.

Criterion Film Productions provided £22,500 of the budget and Tommy Steele deferred £7,500 of his fee.

== Reception ==
=== Box office ===
Light Up the Sky! earned Bryanston a small profit of £4,466. Kine Weekly called it a "money maker" at the British box office in 1960.

=== Critical ===
The Monthly Film Bulletin wrote: "No doubt Army life on a home station is a mixture of grim "humour, farce and sentiment, but Lewis Gilbert should have taken the title of the original play Touch It Light more literally. His direction of good comic talent is heavy. The cast, in any case, seem to be fighting a script which moves from one comic situation to the next without any sense of narrative development or cohesion. Benny Hill and Sydney Tafler emerge as sympathetic characters, but the camaraderie which the film purports to show is too often lost in patronising officer-and-men relationships, sketchy characterisation and sheer, crude mawkishness."

The Guardian in 1960 described Light Up the Sky! as a "small, sensible and somehow touching film with a whiff of authenticity about it".

The Radio Times called it a "hackneyed theatrical hand-me-down".

Eleanor Mannikka at Allmovie called it an "unexceptional comedy".

TV Guide called it "pointless", but observed Benny Hill "exhibits the form that would later make him a popular television star in both the UK and US" and admitted to finding the film "occasionally amusing".

Film Threat called it "A great little wartime drama" and asked "Why isn't this gem better known?"

Film reviewer Peter Burnett noted that "for British nostalgia fans and cineastes in general, it will be a fabulous treat".
