= Mickey Dunn =

Mickey Dunn may refer to:

- Mickey Dunn, a character played by Roger Daltrey in one episode of the American TV series CSI: Crime Scene Investigation
- Mickey Dunne, 1967 British TV series starring Dinsdale Landen
