= L'Angoisse =

French play

- Written by: Pierre Mills; Celia de Vilyars
- Original language: French
- Genre: thriller

L'Angoisse is a French play by Pierre Mills and Celia de Vilyars. The film rights to it were bought by Vernon Sewell who filmed it four times: The Medium (1934), Latin Quarter (1945), Ghost Ship (1952) and House of Mystery (1961).
