= Violent Moment =

1959 film by Sidney Hayers

- Directed by: Sidney Hayers
- Written by: Peter Barnes
- Based on: story A Toy for Jiffy (Ellery Queen's Mystery Magazine, 1956) by Roy Vickers
- Produced by: Bernard Coote
- Starring: Lyndon Brook; Jane Hylton; Jill Browne; Rupert Davies
- Cinematography: Phil Grindrod
- Edited by: Sidney Hayers
- Music by: Stanley Black
- Production company: Independent Artists
- Distributed by: Anglo-Amalgamated Film Distributors
- Release date: March 1959
- Running time: 61 minutes
- Country: United Kingdom
- Language: English

Violent Moment (U.S. title: Rebound) is a 1959 British second feature ('B') drama film directed by Sidney Hayers and starring Lyndon Brook, Jane Hylton and Jill Browne. It was film editor Hayers' first film as director. It also marked the debut of Moira Redmond. It was written by Peter Barnes based on the 1956 story "A Toy for Juffy" by Roy Vickers, from his "Department of Dead Ends" series, originally published from 1934. These stories were ‘inverted’ mysteries: the reader knows the identity of the criminal, but the interest lies in how the detective solves the case and featured detectives dusting off cold cases. As with many of the criminals in Vickers’ stories, the protagonist is sympathetically depicted.

The film was released in the cinema with its own credits; later, it was released in the Edgar Wallace Mysteries series, with that show's credits.

== Premise ==
A deserter from the British Army kills his girlfriend during a fight. Although he becomes a successful businessman, his past eventually catches up with him.

== Cast ==
- Lyndon Brook as Douglas Baines
- Jane Hylton as Daisy Hacker
- Jill Browne as Janet Greenway
- John Paul as Sgt. Ranson
- Rupert Davies as Bert Glennon
- Moira Redmond as Kate Glennon
- Bruce Seton as Inspector Davis
- Martin Miller as Hendricks
- Gerald Naderson as Police Superintendent
- Martin Boddey as nightwatchman
- John Boxer as Det. Sgt. Jarman
- Frederick Piper as Jenkins

== Critical reception ==
The Monthly Film Bulletin wrote: "This confected melodrama relies far too much on coincidence to carry any real conviction. The actors have little success in disguising the loopholes in the plot, though Lyndon Brook endows the obsessed murderer with some degree of sympathy."

Picturegoer wrote: "It's a modest, off-the-peg story, short on action, but told with urgency and style. Brook gives a wet-palmed portrayal of a killer and there's good support from Jane Hylton as his flashy mistress and Jill Browne as his secretary."

Picture Show wrote: "Neatly made crime melodrama ... The theme of frustrated paternal love runs throughout this unusual story that is well acted, especially by Lyndon Brook as the murderer."

In British Sound Films: The Studio Years 1928–1959 David Quinlan rated the film as "mediocre", writing: "contrived, shabbily acted (apart from Brook) drama."

Noirish wrote, "although the cheapness of the production is very evident and the aspirations are modest, this is by no means a negligible movie."

== Bibliography ==
- Michael, Robert & Cotter, Bob. The Women of Hammer Horror: A Biographical Dictionary and Filmography. McFarland, 2013.
- Murphy, Robert. British Cinema and the Second World War. Bloomsbury Publishing, 2005.
