= Laughing in the Sunshine =

1956 British-Swedish film by Daniel Birt

- Swedish poster
- Directed by: Daniel Birt
- Written by: Daniel Birt; Tim Carew
- Produced by: John Martin
- Starring: Jane Hylton; Bengt Logardt; Adolf Jahr
- Cinematography: Sven Nykvist
- Music by: Jules Sylvain
- Production companies: Logardt-Film; Sandrews; Swint Film
- Distributed by: United Artists
- Release date: 2 January 1956
- Running time: 80 minutes
- Countries: Sweden; United Kingdom
- Language: English

Laughing in the Sunshine (Swedish: Ett kungligt äventyr) is a 1956 British-Swedish second feature ('B') romance film directed by Daniel Birt and starring Jane Hylton, Bengt Logardt and Adolf Jahr. It was written by Birt and Tim Carew and was Birt's final film. It is sometimes alternatively described as a British-Danish co-production.

== Synopsis ==
Princess Caroline arrives in Stockholm wishing to travel incognito and encounters Prince Birger who is also in disguise. They fall in love.

== Cast ==
- Jane Hylton as Princess Caroline
- Bengt Logardt as Prince Birger
- Adolf Jahr as Sniska
- Jean Anderson as Diana Masefield
- Peter Dyneley as Greg Preston
- Marjorie Fielding as Lady Preston
- Nils Kihlberg as aide
- Arne Källerud as waiter
- Torsten Lilliecrona as policeman
- Stanley Maxted as J.G. Parker
- Ragnar Arvedson as footman
- Gösta Prüzelius as man
- Georg Skarstedtas man

== Production ==
The fim was shot at the Centrumateljéerna Studios in Stockholm and on location around the city. The film's sets were designed by the art director Nils Nilsson.

== Reception ==
The Monthly Film Bulletin wrote: "An uninventive script, flat direction and a nauseating theme-song scarcely help to sustain interest in this modern fairy-story, while the acting generally (the Princess is alternately proud and coy, the Prince all smiles and accent) is lacking in the necessary charm and finesse. The only positive assets are some attractive views of Stockholm and an amusingly ludicrous cameo by Adolf Jahr as a knowing Finnish smuggler."

Kine Weekly wrote: "Friendly disarmingly naive Eastman Color Ruritanian comedy, smoothly portrayed by an international cast. Staged in Sweden, it tells of romance between a prince and a princess, both of whom are travelling incognito, and, true to tradition, has a and-they-lived-happily-ever-after fade-out. Its tale is neither emotionally compelling nor particularly witty, but nevertheless makes an appropriate peg for delightful views of Stockholm and Scandinavian outer-reaches. It'll please the ladies."

The Daily Film Renter wrote: "Pleasant royal romance in delightful Swedish backgrounds; for sentimentalists."
