= The Mask of Janus =

1965 British TV spy series

- Created by: John Gould
- Starring: Peter Dyneley; Dinsdale Landen; Simon Oates
- Country of origin: United Kingdom
- No. of series: 1
- No. of episodes: 11 (7 missing)

Production
- Producer: Terence Dudley
- Running time: 50 minutes

Original release
- Network: BBC1
- Release: 8 October – 27 December 1965

The Mask of Janus is a British eleven-part television series produced by the BBC in 1965, starring Dinsdale Landen as counter espionage agent Richard Cadell.

The series is set in the fictional European country of Amalia and dealt with the political interests of the British, American and Communist espionage communities within. Eschewing the action formula of its ITV contemporaries (e.g. Danger Man and the early seasons of The Avengers), the series dealt with more politically oriented plots such as defections to the west, awakening "sleeper" agents and the leaking of official secrets. As of 2009, seven of the original episodes of this programme are still missing from BBC archives.

A spin-off series called The Spies, also starring Landen, followed in 1966.
