= Andrew Ray =

English actor (1939–2003)

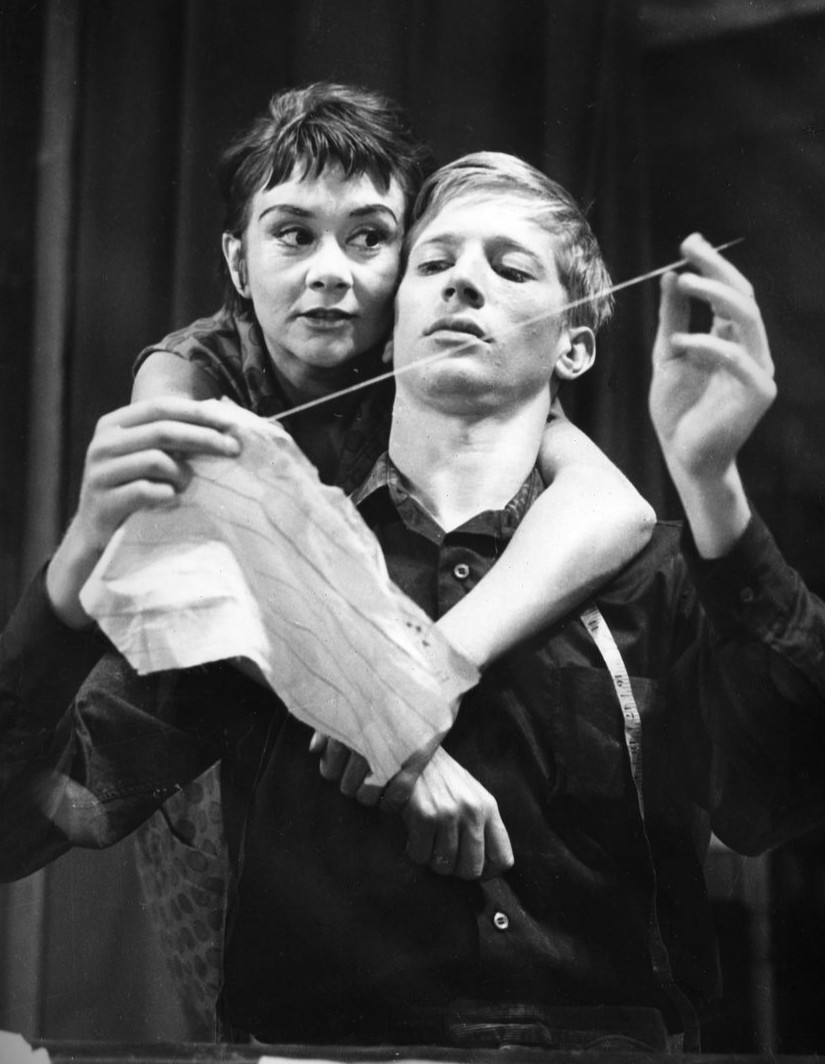
- Ray with Joan Plowright in "A Taste of Honey" on Broadway in 1960
- Born: Andrew Olden; 31 May 1939; Southgate, London, England, United Kingdom
- Died: 20 August 2003 (aged 64)
- Occupation: Actor
- Years active: 1950−
- Spouse: Susan Burnet
- Parent: Ted Ray (father)
- Family: Robin Ray (brother)

Andrew Ray (31 May 1939 – 20 August 2003) was an English actor who was best known as a child star.

== Biography ==
He was born Andrew Olden (Ray was his father's stage name) in Southgate, Middlesex, the son of the radio comic Ted Ray and his wife, showgirl Dorothy Sybil (née Stevens). Ray's life was transformed at the age of 10 when he was cast in the title part of The Mudlark, a 20th Century Fox film starring Alec Guinness and Irene Dunne. He played a street urchin who ends up meeting Queen Victoria. The film was chosen as the Royal Command Performance in 1950.

He was featured in numerous films during the next few years, including The Yellow Balloon (1953), Escapade (1955), Woman in a Dressing Gown (1957), The Young and the Guilty (1958), Serious Charge (1959) with Cliff Richard, Twice Round the Daffodils (1962), and The System (1964). He also portrayed Herbert Pocket in the ITC remake of Charles Dickens's Great Expectations (1974) opposite Michael York. His later films included Rough Cut (1980), The Bunker (1981), Pope John Paul II (1984) and Paris by Night (1988).

Theatre roles included Flowering Cherry (with Sir Ralph Richardson and Celia Johnson), and A Taste of Honey on Broadway (with Angela Lansbury and Joan Plowright).

At the age of 19, he married the Rhodesian actress Susan Burnet and they later had two children.

Ray appeared in numerous film, theatre and television roles over the years, including as nuclear scientist Klaus Fuchs for Anglia Television and as King George VI in Crown Matrimonial on stage and television. So successful was his depiction on stage of the stammering George VI that he was cast in the same role (though then Prince Albert, Duke of York) in the television series Edward & Mrs. Simpson (1978).

He starred in six episodes of television series Tales of the Unexpected, "The Wrong 'Un", "Royal Jelly", "Poison", "The Way To Do It", "The Best Chess Player in the World" and "Accidental Death". He also appeared in Upstairs, Downstairs, Inspector Morse, and Peak Practice.

In later years, Ray was a committed member of Equity and served as a Councillor of the actors' union.

Ray died at the age of 64 in 2003 from a heart attack. His brother Robin Ray was a well-known television and radio personality who died in 1998, also at the age of 64.

== Filmography ==
=== Film ===
- The Mudlark (1950) - Wheeler - the Mudlark
- The Yellow Balloon (1953) - Frankie
- Escape by Night (1953) - Joey Weston
- A Prize of Gold (1955) - Conrad
- Escapade (1955) - Max Hampden
- Woman in a Dressing Gown (1957) - Brian Preston
- Gideon's Day (1958) - P.C. Farnaby Green
- The Young and the Guilty (1958) - Eddie Marshall
- Serious Charge (1959) - Larry Thompson
- Twice Round the Daffodils (1962) - Chris Walker
- Der Schwur des Soldaten Pooley (1963) - Ginger
- The System (1964) - Willy
- Rough Cut (1980) - Pilbrow
- Paris by Night (direct-to-video, 1988) - Michael Swanton

=== Television ===
- Upstairs Downstairs (1974) - Lt. Jack Dyson RFC
- Death of an Expert Witness (1983) - Clifford Bradley
- Inspector Morse (1992) - Alfred Rydale
- Edward and Mrs .Simpson (1978) - Duke of York
