= The Mudlark =

1950 film by Jean Negulesco

- Original film poster
- Directed by: Jean Negulesco
- Screenplay by: Hilda Grenier; Nunnally Johnson
- Based on: The Mudlark; 1949 novel by Theodore Bonnet
- Produced by: Nunnally Johnson
- Starring: Irene Dunne; Alec Guinness; Andrew Ray; Beatrice Campbell; Finlay Currie; Anthony Steel; Raymond Lovell; Marjorie Fielding; Constance Smith
- Cinematography: Georges Périnal
- Edited by: Thelma Connell
- Music by: William Alwyn
- Distributed by: 20th Century Fox
- Release dates: October 30, 1950 (UK); December 23, 1950 (New York); January 30, 1950 (Los Angeles)
- Running time: 99 minutes
- Countries: United Kingdom; United States
- Language: English
- Box office: $1 million (US rentals)

The Mudlark is a 1950 film starring Irene Dunne, Alec Guinness and Andrew Ray. Filmed in Great Britain by Twentieth Century-Fox, it is a fictional account of how Queen Victoria emerged from a period of mourning for her dead husband, Prince Albert. The film was directed by Jean Negulesco, written and produced by Nunnally Johnson and based on the 1949 novel of the same name by American artillery sergeant, San Francisco newspaperman, Los Angeles Times reporter and film-studio publicist Theodore Bonnet.

The film's title refers to mudlarks, street children who survived by scavenging and selling what they could find on the banks of the River Thames. The film was a hit in Britain and made an overnight star of Andrew Ray, who played the title character.

== Plot ==
A young street urchin named Wheeler, half-starved, homeless and an orphan, finds a cameo containing the likeness of Queen Victoria. Not recognising the queen, he is told that she is the "mother of all England". Taking the remark literally, he journeys to Windsor Castle to see her.

Wheeler sneaks into the castle and is first spotted by a sympathetic maid, Kate Noonan, but before she can safely see him out, he is forced to hide in the dining room when the queen enters. He falls asleep and is discovered by his snoring during the meal. Wheeler is questioned by John Brown, the queen's friend and confidant, who soon sees that Wheeler is not part of any plot against the queen. Brown takes Wheeler on a tour of the castle, even drunkenly encouraging him to sit on the throne. The authorities find Wheeler and take him into custody for interrogation, and he spends Christmas in the Tower of London. Wild rumours circulate among the general public.

Prime minister Benjamin Disraeli has been unsuccessful in persuading the widowed Victoria to end her seclusion following the death of her husband 15 years earlier. Disraeli sees an opportunity to change her mind and pleads for Wheeler and those like him in Parliament, delivering a speech that indirectly criticizes the queen for withdrawing from public life. The queen is infuriated by his action and confronts him with her anger. She refuses to become more accessible to her subjects, despite Brown's urging, but when Wheeler appears once again, she is genuinely moved upon meeting him for the first time and once again enters public life.

Lady Emily Prior and lieutenant Charles McHatten are in love, but the queen is opposed to the relationship because of McHattan's social position. They try to elope twice, but each time McHatten is summoned on business related to Wheeler. The queen eventually relents and the third attempt at elopement succeeds.

== Cast ==
- Irene Dunne as Queen Victoria
- Alec Guinness as Benjamin Disraeli
- Andrew Ray as Wheeler
- Beatrice Campbell as Lady Emily Prior
- Finlay Currie as John Brown, Queen Victoria's servant
- Anthony Steel as Lieutenant Charles McHatten
- Raymond Lovell as Sergeant Footman Naseby
- Marjorie Fielding as Lady Margaret Prior
- Constance Smith as Kate Noonan
- Edward Rigby as The Watchman
- Ernest Clark as Hammond
- Wilfrid Hyde-White as Tucker

== Background ==
In Theodore Bonnet's semi-historical novel upon which the film was based, the story of the young mudlark Wheeler (age ten in the film, but seven in the book) sneaking into Windsor Castle in 1875 to see Queen Victoria was inspired by a 14 December 1838 incident involving Edward Jones (called "the boy Jones" by newspapers), who was discovered in Buckingham Palace. At first mistaken for a chimney sweep, the boy gave his name as Edward Cotton and said that he had been born in the palace. He later claimed to have been living there for only a year after having come from Hertfordshire. In fact, he was the 14-year-old son of a tailor who lived in Bell Yard, 300 yards from the palace.

== Production ==
This production was British-made for Fox, shot at Denham Studios, featuring a "heavily made-up" Irene Dunne as Queen Victoria with Alec Guinness, "all fuss and business", as Prime Minister Benjamin Disraeli and the "scamp" boy, played by Andrew Ray, the 11-year-old son of comedian Ted Ray.

== Release ==
The film's London Royal Command Performance release occurred October 31, 1950. The film's Hollywood premiere was held at Grauman's Chinese Theatre on January 30, 1951 as a benefit for St. John's Hospital, for whom the film's star Irene Dunne served as guild chairman. The benefit's master of ceremonies was George Jessel and Dunne was presented with a medal by the head of the hospital. The event raised approximately $135,000.

== Reception ==
In a contemporary review for The New York Times, critic Bosley Crowther called The Mudlark "a warm and rewarding show" and wrote:

Since Christmas is a time for telling stories about children and brotherly love, about the humbleness of the mighty and the nobility of the poor, it's altogether fitting and attractive that Twentieth Century-Fox should bring along its handsome screen version of "The Mudlark" to brighten the holidays. ... As a piece of sentimental fiction "The Mudlark" is quite a tale, and Nunnally Johnson has produced it in the richest sort of port-and-mutton style. ... Properly, the honors for performance unqualifiedly go to little Andrew Ray, the English youngster, who plays the title role. In his wee face, he touchingly expresses the amazement and confusion of a humble guttersnipe caught in the stiff and ponderous meshes of an unsuspected trap. In his small voice, he chirps the shocking candor and independence of a Cockney toff. And in his slight frame, he demonstrates the vigor and agility of all the world's young boys. "The Mudlark" comes forth a cheering picture largely because of Master Ray."

Variety stated, "Let there be no illusions about The Mudlark. It is not a great picture. But it is a good one."

Critic Edwin Schallert of the Los Angeles Times wrote:

'The Mudlark' will probably take its place as memorable in the year's film output. Quality especially marks the performances. ... Taste and style are amply evidenced in the treatment of nearly all episodes. And while 'The Mudlark' never moves too swiftly or easily on its course, it has both class and appeal and should be enjoyed by a large audience which desires a picture out of the ordinary.

== Award nominations ==
Edward Stevenson and Margaret Furse were nominated for the Academy Award for Best Costume Design in a black-and-white film.
