= Jane Hylton =

British actress (1927–1979)

- Born: Gwen Clark; 16 July 1927; London, England
- Died: 28 February 1979 (aged 51); Glasgow, Scotland
- Occupation: Actress
- Years active: 1946–1979
- Spouse(s): Euan Lloyd (divorced) Peter Dyneley (m. 1956; died 1977)
- Children: Rosalind Lloyd

Jane Hylton (born Gwen Clark; 16 July 1927 – 28 February 1979) was an English actress who accumulated 30 film credits, mostly in the 1940s and 1950s, before moving into television work in the latter half of her career in the 1960s and 1970s.

== Early life and education ==
Jane Hylton was born as Gwen Clark on 16 July 1927 in Deptford, London.

== Career ==
Talent-spotted in her teens, Hylton was a product of the Rank Organisation's Company of Youth (more commonly referred to as the Rank Charm School), which took promising young actors and groomed them for careers in film. The programme turned out some genuine stars, such as Christopher Lee and Diana Dors, but most alumni only had modest film careers. Hylton, however, featured in substantial acting roles and received prominent billing.

Hylton's first screen appearance came in the 1946 film A Girl in a Million. She quickly moved on to minor roles in films produced by Gainsborough Studios (Jassy, When the Bough Breaks) and Ealing Studios (Holiday Camp, It Always Rains on Sunday), then in 1948 landed her largest role to that time, as an escaped convict's mistress in Gainsborough's My Brother's Keeper. She was cast as one of the Huggett daughters in the successful comedy Here Come the Huggetts, then in 1949 as Molly Reed in the Ealing Comedy Passport to Pimlico.

In the early 1950s, Hylton was cast in major roles in several films with a predominantly female cast and targeted at female audiences - Dance Hall (1950), It Started in Paradise (1952 – set in the world of haute couture) and the 1954 women's prison drama The Weak and the Wicked. The quality of film roles offered to her then began to fall and she found herself for the rest of the decade toiling mainly in quickly shot B-films, an exception being a prominent role in the 1960 horror film Circus of Horrors.

Hylton's first television appearance was in the starring role of Queen Guinevere in the 1956 series The Adventures of Sir Lancelot, then from the early 1960s she spent her career entirely in television, where she featured in a number of one-off productions for BBC and ITV drama strands as well as series such as Dixon of Dock Green, Journey to the Unknown, The Troubleshooters and Take Three Girls. Her most identifiable TV role was Beryl Fisher, the mother of Betty Spencer (Michele Dotrice) in the BBC comedy series Some Mothers Do 'Ave 'Em.

== Critical assessment ==
The film historians Steve Chibnall and Brian McFarlane praise her "quite unusual intensity and a real capacity for depicting working-class lives", and note her extensive B movie career in the 1950s: "Virtually everything she did is worth watching, for her if sometimes for little else." They add that each film she was in "benefits from the instinctive humanity, the sense of her characters having a past and a place in the world, which she brings to them".

== Personal life ==
Hylton's first marriage to film producer Euan Lloyd ended in divorce, although the couple remained on good terms. The marriage produced a daughter, Rosalind Lloyd, who also became an actress; Hylton and her daughter both appeared in Lloyd's big budget 1978 mercenary drama The Wild Geese, which was Hylton's first film role for 17 years and was her last.

Hylton's second marriage to actor Peter Dyneley, whom she met on the set of Ett kunglit aventyr (Laughing in the Sunshine), made in 1956, lasted until Dyneley's death from cancer in 1977.

== Death ==
Hylton, who had been diagnosed with a congenital heart defect in her late 30s, died of a heart attack in Glasgow on 28 February 1979, aged 51.

== Partial filmography ==
- The Years Between (1946) – Minor role (uncredited)
- A Girl in a Million (1946) – Nurse
- Dear Murderer (1947) – Rita
- The Upturned Glass (1947) – Miss Marsh
- Holiday Camp (1947) – Receptionist
- Jassy (1947) – Amelia (uncredited)
- When the Bough Breaks (1947) – Maid
- It Always Rains on Sunday (1947) – Bessie, his sister
- Daybreak (1948) – Doris
- Streets Paved with Water (1947) (abandoned during filming)
- Good-Time Girl (1948) – Doris
- My Sister and I (1948) – Elsie
- My Brother's Keeper (1948) – Nora Lawrence
- Here Come the Huggetts (1948) – Jane Huggett
- Passport to Pimlico (1949) – Molly
- Dance Hall (1950) – Mary
- Out of True (1951, Short) – Molly Slade
- The Quiet Woman (1951) – Jane
- The Tall Headlines (1952) – Frankie Rackham
- It Started in Paradise (1952) – Martha Watkins
- The Weak and the Wicked (1954) – Babs Peters, inmate
- Burnt Evidence (1954) – Diana Taylor
- Secret Venture (1955) – Joan Butler
- Laughing in the Sunshine (1956) – Princess Caroline
- You Pay Your Money (1957) – Mrs. Delgado
- Dial 999 (TV series) (1958) - Ruth Harrison
- Violent Moment (1959) – Daisy Hacker
- Deadly Record (1959) – Ann Garfield
- The Manster (1959) – Linda Stanford
- Devil's Bait (1959) – Ellen Frisby
- Night Train for Inverness (1960) – Marion
- Circus of Horrors (1960) – Angela
- House of Mystery (1961) – Stella Lemming
- Bitter Harvest (1963) – Carole (uncredited)
- The Wild Geese (1978) – Mrs. Marjorie Young
