= Ghost Ship (1952 film) =

1952 British film by Vernon Sewell

- U.S. poster
- Directed by: Vernon Sewell
- Written by: Vernon Sewell; Philip Thornton (additional dialogue)
- Based on: play L'Angoisse by Celia de Vilyars and Pierre Mills
- Produced by: Henry Geddes (associate producer)
- Starring: Dermot Walsh; Hazel Court; Hugh Latimer; Hugh Burden; John Robinson
- Cinematography: Stanley Grant
- Edited by: Francis Beiber
- Music by: Eric Spear
- Color process: Black and white
- Production company: Vernon Sewell Productions
- Distributed by: Anglo-Amalgamated Film Distributors
- Release date: October 1952
- Running time: 75 minutes
- Country: United Kingdom
- Language: English

Ghost Ship is a 1952 British second feature horror film directed by Vernon Sewell and starring Dermot Walsh and Hazel Court. It was written by Sewell and Philip Thornton. This was one of four attempts by Sewell to adapt and film the Pierre Mills and Celia de Vilyars Grand Guignol stage play L'Angoisse.

== Plot ==
Guy and Margaret, a newlywed couple, meet a broker to purchase the steam yacht Cyclops, intending to renovate it as their home. Before the sale, the Yard Manager recounts the ship's history. After the war, it was bought by Professor Martineau, an atomic scientist, who installed gadgets like automatic gyro steering. Martineau, his wife, and their engineer Peter sailed for Deauville but never arrived. After the Cyclops lost contact, it was assumed they struck a mine. A month later, fishermen found the yacht abandoned. An inquiry revealed it had been deserted for three days with the equipment in perfect condition, no distress signals sent, and one lifebuoy missing. A body was found onshore, but Martineau's housekeeper said it was not him due to the lack of a burn scar on the arm. The inquiry concluded two must have drowned trying to save the third.

The Yard Manager informs Guy and Margaret that the Cyclops has had many owners since, never staying with one long-term. He hints the yacht might be haunted, having smelled cigar smoke onboard. Guy suspects the manager is reluctant to sell due to smuggling operations. The couple purchases the Cyclops and begins an overhaul. Unable to find a local deckhand, Guy hires Mansel, who dismisses the haunting rumors and had poorly maintained the yacht for years. At their housewarming party aboard the Cyclops, a guest mentions smelling a cigar. That night, the engineer quits, claiming his wife is ill, though the Yard Manager later casts doubt, suggesting a ghost sighting caused his departure.

Guy hires a new engineer, but Margaret complains about cigar smoke in their quarters. When Guy confronts the engineer, he quits, claiming to have seen a ghost as well. Later, Margaret receives a phone call from the bridge with only breathing on the line, but Guy and Mansel are both unavailable. Investigating, the couple finds the bridge empty, though Margaret faints after again smelling cigar smoke. She begins to believe in a supernatural presence, but Guy remains skeptical, thinking someone is trying to scare them off the Cyclops. While working in the engine room, Guy briefly sees a man smoking a cigar who vanishes when challenged. Debating whether to sell the yacht, Margaret contacts the Institute for Investigation of Psychic Phenomena and hires Dr. Fawcett, a paranormal investigator.

Dr. Fawcett senses a strong psychic presence aboard, also noticing the smell of cigar smoke, though Guy remains doubtful. He invites a medium, Mrs. Manley, to hold a séance. During the séance, they uncover that Martineau's wife and Peter were having an affair and plotted to kill Martineau and throw him overboard. Martineau, overhearing the plan after breaking the bridge phone, confronted and shot them both, hiding their bodies in a disused water tank beneath the floor. Martineau then took money, altered the yacht's course, and jumped overboard with a lifebuoy. Guy and Dr. Fawcett locate the water tank and confirm the story, but before they can notify the police, Mansel commits suicide on deck. Realizing Mansel had a burn scar on his arm, Guy concludes Mansel was actually Professor Martineau. Dr. Fawcett reassures Guy that now Martineau is dead, the haunting should cease. Relieved, Guy and Margaret set sail on the Cyclops.

== Cast ==
- Dermot Walsh as Guy Thornton
- Hazel Court as Margaret Thornton
- Hugh Burden as Dr. Fawcett
- John Robinson as Mansel / Prof. Martineau
- Hugh Latimer as Peter
- Joan Carol as Mrs. Martineau
- Joss Ambler as yard manager
- Mignon O'Doherty as Mrs. Manley
- Laidman Browne as coroner
- Meadows White as Mr. Leech, yard surveyor
- Pat McGrath as Bert, 1st fisherman
- Joss Ackland as Ron, 2nd fisherman
- John King-Kelly as Sid, 3rd fisherman (as John King Kelly)
- Colin Douglas as 1st engineer
- Jack Stewart as 2nd engineer
- Anthony Marlowe as Thomas Selter (Lloyd's surveyor)
- Geoffrey Dunn as strange passenger
- Ian Carmichael as Bernard
- Anthony Hayes as pianist
- Barry Phelps as steward
- Robert Moore as Police Inspector
- Ewen Solon as plain clothes man
- Jock Finlay as policeman
- Madoline Thomas as Mrs. Morgan, housekeeper
- Graham Stuart as 1st guest
- Gordon Bell as 2nd guest
- Patricia Owens as Joyce, party girl
- Melissa Stribling as Vera, party girl

== Production ==
The film received partial funding from Anglo-Amalgamated. It starred the real life husband and wife team of Dermot Walsh and Hazel Court. Most filming took place in Merton Park Studios with exteriors shot on the director's own yacht, Gelert, in the English Channel.

There are some limited shots of Shoreham Harbour canal, Southwick Town Hall, and Lady Bee Marina.

== Critical reception ==
Variety wrote: "Plot basis is promising, but there's a lot of talk and waste motion before it goes into the suspense aspects. ... Playing generally is good, the unfamiliar faces of the cast helping to keep the characters from appearing as types. Outside of dawdling too much over the first half of the footage, Vernon Sewell's production, direction and writing serve their respective purposes adequately."

TV Guide called the film a "talky but fairly atmospheric effort ... hampered by its low budget."

Writing in British Sound Films, David Quinlan described the film as an "eerie dose of maritime mystery"

Leslie Halliwell called it a "mildly unusual second feature"

The Radio Times Guide to Films gave the film 1/5 stars, writing: "Buying a vessel that's haunted, even at a bargain price, is asking for trouble, as the young couple played by Dermot Walsh and Hazel Court find out in this waterlogged British B-feature. After they discover that the previous owner killed his spouse and her lover on board, they're on their way to laying the ship's ghost. Vernon Sewell, who was able to combine film-making with a love of the sea, probably had more fun than the audience."

== See also ==
- List of British films of 1952
