= Fernanda Marlowe =

British actress (born 1942)

- Born: Fernanda Merelina Perredita; 7 September 1942 (age 83); Chelsea, London, England
- Occupations: Actress, artist
- Spouse: George Oscar Herford (m. 1972; died 2023)

Fernanda Marlowe (born 7 September 1942) is a British actress, best known for her role as Corporal Bell in the Doctor Who stories The Mind of Evil and The Claws of Axos (both 1971).

== Early life ==
Born into an acting family of Spanish descent (her grandfather being Fernando Perredita), her parents were the actors Anthony Marlowe (real name Thomas Fernando Perredita) and (Pamela) Merelina Watts.

Marlowe's other acting credits include episodes of Ghost Squad (in which her father played a regular character), Drama 61-67 and Dixon of Dock Green.

== Lloyds Names Scandal ==
After marrying an accountant, Marlowe gave up acting to bring up her children. She became a victim of the Lloyds Names Scandal by backing policies underwritten by the Gooda Walker agencies, owing up to £750,000 in debt and as a result, went on to support others affected by this ordeal. During this time, she became secretary of the Gooda Walker Direct Names Association to represent other heavy losers, turned her home into a bed and breakfast establishment to reclaim costs and tried to return to acting, playing a victim in a reconstruction on Crimewatch.

== Art ==
After bringing up her children, Marlowe retrained as a painter at Heatherley School of Art. Her working style consists mainly in oil, with subjects including landscapes, urban and still life artwork, exhibiting the pieces in London and Aldeburgh. From 1990 to 2013, she was Founder Member and Vice Chairman of Young Art and helped to organise the first YA exhibition.
