= Simon Oates =

English actor (1932–2009)

- Born: Arthur Charles Oates; 6 January 1932; London, England
- Died: 20 May 2009 (aged 77); Eastbourne, East Sussex, England
- Occupation: Actor
- Spouse: Jaki Eastoe (? - 2009)
- Children: 1

Simon Oates (6 January 1932 – 20 May 2009) was an English actor best known for his roles on television.

== Early life ==
Arthur Charles Simon Oates was born on 6 January 1932 in Canning Town, east London. Moving to Finchley in his teens, Oates trained as a heating engineer for his father's firm before becoming an actor. He was in the British Army's Intelligence Corps during his national service.

== Career ==
Working in theatrical rep during the 1950s, he was leading man at York Theatre Royal for some years before being cast as Dr. John Ridge in the science fiction television series Doomwatch, co-starring John Paul as Dr. Spencer Quist and Robert Powell as Toby Wren. He appeared regularly as Anthony Kelly in the 1960s espionage series The Mask of Janus and its spin-off series The Spies.

Oates's many guest appearances included The Avengers, Man in a Suitcase, Jason King, The New Avengers, The Professionals, Bergerac, and The 10 Percenters. He was memorable as the suave, tuxedoed, hard man in the heist episode The Trojan Tanker in the classic spy-fi series Department S (1968). It was his attire and performance in this fine episode that may have suggested the role of James Bond to producers. His film appearances were few but included Night Train to Paris (1964), the British sci-fi film The Terrornauts (1967), the film version of Doomwatch (1972) and Major Darling in BBC's Strangers and Brothers (1984).

Oates appeared on the stage in a 1971 adaptation of The Avengers, as John Steed, opposite Sue Lloyd and Kate O'Mara, and in the West End production of the Francis Durbridge thriller Suddenly at Home. Oates worked as both an actor and director in theatre productions internationally, and founded a touring theatre company in Canada, where he lived for some time.

Oates's son, Justin Brett, also an actor, said that his father was offered the role of James Bond in Diamonds Are Forever, but that Sean Connery changed his mind and returned to the role. Other sources suggest that Oates was in the running before Roger Moore was confirmed as 007 for Live and Let Die.

In tandem with his straight acting career, Oates also appeared many times as a stand-up comic and compere, working with such stars as Tom Jones, Sandie Shaw, and the Who. He also appeared at the London Palladium with Dorothy Squires. He directed Woman in a Dressing Gown, starring Brenda Bruce at the Vaudeville Theatre. He also directed many musicals and straight plays on the touring circuit.

== Death ==
Oates died on Wednesday, 20 May 2009, following a protracted illness.
