= Der Schwur des Soldaten Pooley =

1961 film

- Directed by: Kurt Jung-Alsen
- Written by: Kurt Jung-Alsen; Franz Fühmann
- Based on: The Vengeance of Private Pooley by Cyril Jolly
- Starring: Garfield Morgan; Andrew Ray; Ferdy Mayne
- Cinematography: Rolf Sohre
- Edited by: Anneliese Hinze-Sokolowa
- Music by: André Asriel
- Release date: 1961
- Country: East Germany
- Language: German

Der Schwur des Soldaten Pooley , released as The Story of Private Pooley in the UK and The Survivor in the US, is an East German television film about the Le Paradis massacre. It was released in 1961.

An English-language version with Lindsay Anderson as narrator was released in 1963.

== Cast ==
- Garfield Morgan as Albert Pooley
- John Rees as Bill Carter
- Andrew Ray as Nobby
- Lawrence Davidson as Englischer Leutnant
- Ferdy Mayne as Intelligence Officer
- Cecile Chevreau as Madame Creton
- Jennifer Wilson as Mrs. Pooley
- Alfred Müller as Hauptsturmführer
- Jürgen Frohriep as SS-Obersturmführer
- Hans Hardt-Hardtloff as SS-Truppenführer
- Hans Pitra as Holmen
- Gerry Wolff as Arzt
- Rudolf Ulrich as Soldat Max
- Jac Diehl as Sanitätsfeldwebel
- Willi Schrade as Posten
- Rolf Ripperger as SS-Mann
- Hans Sievers as Kradmelder
- Günther Ballier as Englischer Offizier
- Erik Veldre as Lagerdolmetscher
- Ulrich Folkmar as Deutscher Militärarzt
