= Dinsdale Landen =

English actor (1932–2003)

- Born: 4 September 1932; Margate, Kent, England
- Died: 29 December 2003 (aged 71); South Creake, Norfolk, England
- Years active: 1959–1997
- Spouse: Jennifer Daniel (m. 1959)

Dinsdale James Landen (4 September 1932 – 29 December 2003) was an English actor. His television appearances included starring in the shows Devenish (1977) and Pig in the Middle (1980). The Independent named him an "outstanding actor with the qualities of a true farceur". He performed in many Shakespeare plays at Stratford-upon-Avon and Regent's Park Open Air Theatre.

== Early life ==
Landen was born in Margate, Kent, and educated at King's School, Rochester.

== Career ==
Landen made his television debut in 1959 as the adult Pip in an adaptation of Great Expectations and made his film debut in 1960 with a walk-on part in The League of Gentlemen.

During the 1960s he starred in the TV series Mickey Dunne and The Mask of Janus and its spinoff series The Spies. In 1969, he starred as Chris Champers in the comedy series World in Ferment. As a stage actor he appeared as Richard Dazzle in the RSC's 1970 production of London Assurance. He appeared in James Saunders's play Bodies in the West End in 1979, receiving a nomination for a Society of West End Theatre Award.

His film roles include appearances in Operation Snatch (1962), A Jolly Bad Fellow (1964), Rasputin, the Mad Monk (1966), Mosquito Squadron (1969), Every Home Should Have One (1970), Young Winston (1972), Digby, the Biggest Dog in the World (1973), International Velvet (1978), Morons from Outer Space (1985) and both The Buccaneers and The Steal in 1995.

On radio he appeared as General Bel Riose in the 1973 BBC Radio 4 adaptation of The Foundation Trilogy, as Dr Watson in the 1974 adaptation of A Study in Scarlet and Art Gordo in the 1976 adaptation of Jim Eldridge's novel Down Payment on Death. He portrayed Rupert Purvis in the 1982 production of Tom Stoppard's play The Dog It Was That Died and played the urbane Ambassador McKenzie in the BBC Radio 4 series Flying the Flag.

He played Dr Mark Thorn, Guardians officer and official psychiatrist, in Episode 6 of the 1971 London Weekend Television series The Guardians.

Landen was the only actor to play the same character, private detective Matthew Earp, in two episodes of Thriller ("An Echo of Theresa" and "The Next Scream You Hear" from 1973 and 1974 respectively). He appeared in The Glittering Prizes (1976) as Gavin Pope.

In 1977 Landen starred in his own situation comedy, Devenish, playing a Basil Fawlty-type character in a Reggie Perrin-type situation, designing board games. In 1980 he starred as Barty Wade in the television series Pig in the Middle with Liza Goddard.

In 1984 Landen played Jean-Martin Charcot in the television series Freud.

In 1987 he played the lead in a BBC TV production of What the Butler Saw, playing Dr Prentice in a production also featuring Prunella Scales, Timothy West and Bryan Pringle.

In 1989 he made a guest appearance in Doctor Who as Dr Judson, a wheelchair-using genius taken over by the titular villain of the serial The Curse of Fenric.

In 1992 Landen provided the voice of the arch villain Mr Tod in the BBC/Fuji Television children's animated series The World of Peter Rabbit and Friends. He played a recurring role in Lovejoy, a mentor to the main character during the series run in the 1990s.

== Personal life ==
Landen was married to the actress Jennifer Daniel. He and his wife wrote the 1985 nonfiction book The True Story of H.P. Sauce.

== Death ==
Landen died at his home in South Creake, Norfolk, on 29 December 2003 after becoming ill with pneumonia. He had been diagnosed with oral cancer several years before his death, but was in remission at the time.

== Filmography ==
Year	Title	Role	Notes
1960	The League of Gentlemen	Young man in gym receiving instruction from Stevens	Film debut, uncredited
1962	The Valiant	Norris	
1962	Operation Snatch	Capt. Wellington	
1962	We Joined the Navy	Bowles	
1964	A Jolly Bad Fellow	Fred	
1966	The Spies	Richard Cadell	BBC 1 drama series
1966	Rasputin, the Mad Monk	Peter	
1966	Jackanory	Storyteller	Minnow on the Say by Philippa Pearce
1967	Mickey Dunne	Mickey	13 episodes
1969	World in Ferment	Chris Champers	BBC2 series, 6 episodes
1969	Mosquito Squadron	Wing Commander Clyde Penrose	
1970	Every Home Should Have One	Geoffrey Mellish	
1972	Young Winston	Capt. Weaver	
1973	Digby, the Biggest Dog in the World	Colonel Masters	
1973	Jackanory	Storyteller	1 episode: Pippi Longstocking stories Pippi Goes Aboard: Pippi Longstocking Gives a Party
1973	Jackanory	Storyteller	5 episodes: An Older Kind of Magic by Patricia Wrightson
1973–1974	Thriller	Matthew Earp	2 episodes
1974	Rooms	Ron	2 episodes, S1 E30 & E31
1975	Jackanory	Storyteller	Snatched by Richard Parker
1976	The Glittering Prizes	Gavin Pope	Episode 5 ‘An Academic Life’
1978	International Velvet	Mr Curtis	
1984	Freud	Charcot	Miniseries
1985	Morons from Outer Space	Commander Grenville Matteson	
1989	Doctor Who	Dr Judson	Episode: The Curse of Fenric
1990	All Creatures Great and Small	Stewie Brannan	Episode: Food for Thought
1993–1994	Lovejoy	Jim Leonard	2 episodes
1993–1995	The World of Peter Rabbit and Friends	Mr Tod (voice)	2 episodes
1995	The Steal	Sir Wilmot	Final film
