= You Pay Your Money =

1957 British film by Maclean Rogers

- Lobby card
- Directed by: Maclean Rogers
- Written by: Michael Cronin; Maclean Rogers
- Produced by: W.G. Chalmers
- Starring: Hugh McDermott; Jane Hylton; Honor Blackman
- Cinematography: Walter J. Harvey
- Edited by: Ben Hipkins
- Music by: Wilfred Burns
- Production company: Butcher's Film Service
- Distributed by: Butcher's Film Service
- Release date: February 1957 (UK)
- Running time: 68 min.
- Country: United Kingdom
- Language: English

You Pay Your Money is a 1957 British 'B' crime drama film directed by Maclean Rogers and starring Hugh McDermott, Jane Hylton and Honor Blackman. It was written by Michael Cronin and Rogers.

== Plot ==
On a visit to Belgium, married couple Bob and Susie Westlake become involved with wealthy financier, Steve Mordaunt, in the sale and transfer of a collection of rare books. In an attempted burglary at Mordaunt's home, his love interest, Mrs. Rosemary Delgado, is suspected. She was once romantically linked to a gangster and she leads the Westlakes in a search for Achemd's writings, a middle eastern 14th Century seer which has inspired an extreme political group, and thought to be in the collection of rare books that Mourdaunt now owns.

The Westlakes become embroiled in a struggle over the valuable Arabic manuscripts, and when Susie is kidnapped by extremists, Bob works as an assistant to Tom Cookson, a manuscript smuggler who is importing the rare texts the gang are seeking. The extremists demand Mourdaunt turn over his collection of rare books, and plot to incite a revolution across the Middle East but can the Westlakes prevent a serious international situation?

== Cast ==
- Hugh McDermott as Bob Westlake
- Jane Hylton as Mrs. Rosemary Delgado
- Honor Blackman as Susie Westlake
- Hugh Moxey as Tom Cookson
- Ivan Samson as Steve Mordaunt
- Ferdy Mayne as Delal
- Shirley Deane as Doris Squire
- Gerard Heinz as Dr. Burger
- Peter Swanwick as hall porter
- Basil Dignam as Currie
- Fred Griffiths as Fred (driver)
- Ben Williams as Seymour
- Elsie Wagstaff as Ada Seymour
- Vincent Holman as Briggs
- Mark Daly as Goodwin
- Myles Rudge as estate agent
- Jack Taylor as 1st thug
- Larry Taylor as 2nd thug
- Robert Dorning as birdwatcher
- Don Qureshi as Arab
- Lucette Marimar as telephonist
- Amando Guinlee as Belgian seaman
- Shaym Bahadur as Said
- Shripad Pai as man
- George Roderick as Oley Jackson

== Production ==
Principal photography on You Pay Your Money took place in the Nettlefold Studios, Walton-on-Thames, Surrey, England.

== Critical reception ==
The Monthly Film Bulletin wrote: "A routine thriller which fails to thrill in spite of having more than its quota of brutal fights. Fairly lavish sets and competent camera work are wasted on a fatuous plot, and the playing does little to heighten conviction."

The Radio Times wrote, "The much maligned Butcher's Film Service holds an unenviable place in the history of British cinema. By sponsoring dozens of low-budget programmers, it enabled young talent on both sides of the camera to gain an industry foothold. Yet it mostly churned out dismal offerings such as this tale of kidnap and rare book smuggling, which is given only the merest modicum of respectability by the presence of Hugh McDermott and Honor Blackman."

In British Sound Films: The Studio Years 1928–1959 David Quinlan rated the film as "mediocre", writing: "Thriller is vigorous, but you never quite forget how silly the plot is."

TV Guide noted, "the execution is top notch, but the witlessness of the story rankles."
