= Eyes Without a Face (film) =

1960 film by Georges Franju

- French theatrical release poster
- French: Les yeux sans visage
- Directed by: Georges Franju
- Written by: Boileau-Narcejac; Jean Redon; Claude Sautet; Pierre Gascar
- Based on: Les Yeux sans visage (1959 novel) by Jean Redon
- Produced by: Jules Borkon
- Starring: Pierre Brasseur; Alida Valli; Juliette Mayniel; Alexandre Rignault; Béatrice Altariba; François Guérin; Édith Scob
- Cinematography: Eugen Schüfftan
- Edited by: Gilbert Natot
- Music by: Maurice Jarre
- Production companies: Champs-Élysées Productions; Lux Film
- Distributed by: Lux Compagnie Cinématographique de France
- Release date: 2 March 1960 (Paris)
- Running time: 90 minutes
- Countries: France; Italy
- Language: French

Eyes Without a Face (French: Les yeux sans visage) is a 1960 horror film directed by Georges Franju and starring Pierre Brasseur, Alida Valli, Juliette Mayniel, and Édith Scob. Based on a 1959 novel by Jean Redon, who also co-wrote the screenplay, it centers on a plastic surgeon who is determined to perform a face transplant on his daughter, who was disfigured in a car crash.

An international co-production between France's Champs-Élysées Productions and Italy's Lux Film, Eyes Without a Face was shot in Paris and the surrounding suburbs, and at Boulogne Studios. During the film's production, consideration was given to the standards of European censors by minimizing gore. Although Eyes Without a Face was cleared by censors, its release in Europe caused controversy. Critical reaction ranged from praise to disgust.

The film's initial critical reception was not overtly positive, but subsequent theatrical and home video re-releases improved its reputation. Modern critics praise Eyes Without a Face for its poetic approach to the horror genre, as well as for being an influence on other filmmakers. It is widely recognized as one of the greatest and most influential horror films of all time.

The film was released in the US on March 28, 1962 (retitled The Horror Chamber of Dr. Faustus), playing on a double feature with the 1959 Japanese film The Manster.

== Plot ==
Outside Paris, a woman dumps a corpse in the river. The body is identified by Dr. Génessier as his daughter Christiane, who was reported missing after an automobile crash disfigured her face.

In reality, Christiane still lives in Dr. Génessier's mansion next to his private clinic, guarded by German Shepherds and other large dogs. The body (which was disposed of by his assistant Louise) belongs to a young woman whose facial skin Dr. Génessier removed and unsuccessfully attempted to graft onto his daughter.

Christiane (Édith Scob) fails to make a phone call to Jacques Vernon. Scob's face is hidden behind a face-like mask for most of the film.

After her father leaves with promises to restore her face, Christiane, wearing a mask to cover her disfigurement, calls her fiancé, Jacques Vernon, Dr. Génessier's assistant, but hangs up without saying a word.

Génessier's next victim is Edna Grüber, a young woman whom Louise befriends and lures to Génessier's mansion with an offer of a room for rent. Génessier sedates Edna with chloroform, and he and Louise carry her to the lab to prepare her for surgery, secretly watched by Christiane. Later, he removes Edna's facial skin and grafts it onto Christiane's face. The heavily bandaged and faceless Edna attempts to escape but falls to her death from an upstairs window.

After disposing of Edna's corpse, Génessier notices the new tissue is rejected within days, and Christiane has to wear the mask again. She phones Jacques and says his name, but Louise interrupts the call.

Jacques informs the police, who have been investigating the disappearance of young women with similar facial characteristics. Jacques realizes one of the girls looks like Louise. Inspector Parot instructs Paulette Mérodon (recently arrested for shoplifting) to check herself into Génessier's clinic. Soon after, Paulette is picked up by Louise and delivered to Dr. Génessier. Before he begins surgery on Paulette, the police arrive.

While the doctor talks with the police, Christiane, disenchanted with her father's immoral experiments, while slowly losing her mind from guilt and isolation, decides to act. She frees Paulette and murders Louise by stabbing her in the neck. She also frees the dogs and doves that her father uses for experiments. Dr. Génessier dismisses the police (who readily accept his explanations) and returns to his lab. There, a newly acquired German Shepherd attacks him, inciting the other dogs to follow suit, mauling him to death. Christiane, unmoved by his death, strolls out into the woods outside with a dove in her hand.

== Cast ==
- Pierre Brasseur as Dr. Génessier, a physician and father of Christiane. Génessier experiments on his pet dogs and performs heterograft surgeries on women to try and restore the face of his daughter Christiane. Brasseur previously worked with director Georges Franju in the drama, La Tête contre les murs (1958), again in a leading role playing a doctor.
- Alida Valli as Louise, a woman who is Génessier's assistant, kidnaps young women, assists him in the laboratory and acts as a surrogate mother to Christiane. Louise aids Génessier partly because of his help in restoring her damaged face in events that happened before the events of the film.
- Juliette Mayniel as Edna Grüber, a young woman who becomes a victim of Doctor Génessier's experiments after being befriended by Louise in Paris. Edna is the first woman whose face is successfully transplanted to Christiane. While recovering from the surgery, she attacks Louise and then leaps from a window at Génessier's home and dies.
- Alexandre Rignault as Inspector Parot, a police inspector investigating the disappearances of Génessier's victims. Parot ultimately discovers that all of the missing girls have similar features.
- Béatrice Altariba as Paulette Mérodon, a young woman who is taken into police custody after being caught shoplifting. Due to a resemblance with the women Génessier has kidnapped, she is informed by Parot that the charges against her will be dropped if she checks into Génessier's clinic. She is subsequently released and kidnapped to have her face transplanted, but is saved by Christiane before Génessier is able to perform surgery on her.
- François Guérin as Jacques Vernon, a student of Génessier and Christiane's fiancé. Jacques is unaware of Doctor Génessier's criminal activity and believes Christiane is dead. After receiving a phone call from Christiane, he helps the police in investigating the crime.
- Édith Scob as Christiane Génessier, Doctor Génessier's daughter. Christiane's face was damaged in a car crash caused by her father. For most of the film, her face is covered by a stiff mask that resembles her face before the crash. Like Brasseur, Scob was also cast by Franju in La Tête Contre les Murs, but in a minor role. Scob later worked with Franju on four other films.

== Production ==
At the time, modern horror films had not been attempted by French film makers until producer Jules Borkon decided to tap into the horror market. The project was initially conceived as a French response to the success of British Hammer horror films, with producer Jules Borkon seeking to develop a contemporary French horror production. Borkon bought the rights to the Redon novel and offered the directorial role to one of the founders of Cinémathèque Française, Franju, who was directing his first non-documentary feature La Tête contre les murs (1958). Franju had grown up during the French silent-film era when filmmakers such as Georges Méliès and Louis Feuillade were making fantastique-themed films, and he relished the opportunity to contribute to the genre. Franju felt the story was not a horror film; rather, he described his vision of the film as one of "anguish... it's a quieter mood than horror... more internal, more penetrating. It's horror in homeopathic doses."

The original novel on which the film is based was the debut of Jean Redon, a former journalist-turned-film publicist and screenwriter. For years, a rumor persisted that "Redon" was actually a pen name for prolific pulp novelist Frédéric Dard, apparently arising from a contribution of a back-cover quote for the paperback.

To avoid problems with European censors, Borkon cautioned Franju not to include too much blood (which would upset French censors), refrain from showing animals getting tortured (which would upset English censors) and leave out mad-scientist characters (which would upset German censors). All three of these were part of the novel, presenting a challenge to find the right tone for presenting these story elements in the film. First, working with Claude Sautet who was also serving as first assistant director and who laid out the preliminary screenplay, Franju hired the writing team of Boileau-Narcejac (Pierre Boileau and Thomas Narcejac) who had written novels adapted as Henri-Georges Clouzot's Les Diaboliques (1955) and Alfred Hitchcock's Vertigo (1958). The writers shifted the novel's focus from Doctor Génessier's character to that of his daughter, Christiane; this shift revealed the doctor's character in a more positive and understandable light and helped to avoid the censorship restrictions. Jean Redon, a screenwriter by trade, also contributed to the final script.

For his production staff, Franju enlisted people with whom he had previously worked on earlier projects. Cinematographer Eugen Schüfftan, best remembered for developing the Schüfftan process, was chosen to render the visuals of the film. Schüfftan had worked with Franju on La Tête Contre les Murs (1958). Film historian David Kalat called Shüfftan "the ideal choice to illustrate Franju's nightmares". French composer Maurice Jarre created the haunting score for the film. Jarre had also previously worked with Franju on his film La Tête Contre les Murs (1958). Modern critics have observed the film's two imposing musical themes, a jaunty carnival-esque waltz (featured while Louise picks up young women for Doctor Génessier) and a lighter, sadder piece for Christiane.

== Soundtrack ==
Ma Periode Française

Soundtrack album by Maurice Jarre
- Released: February 2005
- Genre: Film music
- Length: 71:11
- Label: Play Time

In February 2005, the French soundtrack record label Play Time released the soundtrack on compact disc along with other soundtracks performed by Jarre. This also includes soundtracks from other Franju films including La Tête contre les Murs and Thérèse Desqueyroux.

All music is composed by Maurice Jarre

No.	Title	Film	Length
1.	"Générique / Surprise-partie"	La Tête contre les Murs	4:30
2.	"Thème de Stéphanie"	La Tête contre les Murs	4:30
3.	"Enterrement à l'asile"	La Tête contre les Murs	2:44
4.	"Générique"	Eyes Without a Face	2:05
5.	"Thème romantique"	Eyes Without a Face	2:50
6.	"Filature"	Eyes Without a Face	1:23
7.	"Des phares dans la nuit"	Eyes Without a Face	3:32
8.	"Valse poursuite"	Eyes Without a Face	1:45
9.	"Final"	Eyes Without a Face	1:01
10.	"Générique"	Thérèse Desqueyroux	1:54
11.	"Non-lieu"	Thérèse Desqueyroux	1:35
12.	"Thérèse Desqueyroux"	Thérèse Desqueyroux	2:50
13.	"La femme idéale"	Les Dragueurs	2:36
14.	"La ballade des dragueurs"	Les Dragueurs	2:47
15.	"Surboum chez Ghislaine"	Les Dragueurs	2:01
16.	"L'oiseau de paradis"	L'Oiseau de Paradis	2:48
17.	"L'univers d'Utrillo"	Un court-métrage de Georges Régnier	4:44
18.	"Générique"	Le Soleil dans l'œil	2:28
19.	"Thème"	Mort, où est ta Victoire ?	3:30
20.	"Valse de Platonov"	Recours en Grâce	3:50
21.	"Les animaux (générique)"	Les Animaux	1:20
22.	"Pavane des flamands roses"	Les Animaux	2:43
23.	"La fête"	Les Animaux	2:18
24.	"Surf des loutres"	Les Animaux	1:59
25.	"Mourir à Madrid"	Mourir à Madrid	4:21
26.	"Générique"	Week-End à Zuydcoote	2:28
27.	"Sergent Maillat"	Week-End à Zuydcoote	3:10
28.	"Final"	Week-End à Zuydcoote	1:29

== Release ==
The film was released in the United States as The Horror Chamber of Dr. Faustus along with The Manster in 1962. In this trailer for the double bill, distributor Lopert Pictures plays on the artistic nature of the film that modern critics would later praise.

Eyes Without a Face completed filming in 1959, and was premiered in Paris on 2 March 1960. Although it passed through the European censors, the film caused controversy on its release in Europe. The French news magazine L'Express commented that the audience "dropped like flies" during the heterografting scene. During the film's showing at the 1960 Edinburgh Film Festival, seven audience members fainted, to which director Franju responded, "Now I know why Scotsmen wear skirts."

=== American version ===
For the US release on March 28, 1962, the film was edited, dubbed into English, and re-titled The Horror Chamber of Dr. Faustus. Distributor Lopert Pictures, a division of United Artists that specialized in arthouse and foreign releases, released the film on a double bill with The Manster (1959).

Edits in the Dr. Faustus version removed parts of the heterografting scene as well as scenes showing Doctor Génessier's more human side, such as his loving care for a small child at his clinic. Lopert Pictures recognized the artistic merit of the film, and played up that element in promotion with an advertisement quoting the London Observer's positive statements about the film and mentioned its showing at the Edinburgh Film Festival. This was in contrast to their presentation of The Manster, which mainly focused on its carny show qualities with its "two-headed monster" and "Invasion from outer space by two-headed creature killer". Eyes Without a Face had a very limited initial run and there was little commentary from the American mainstream press.

=== Reception ===
On the film's initial release, the French critics' general response was moderate, ranging from mild enthusiasm to general disdain or disappointment, claiming it to be either a repetition of German expressionism or simply a disappointment of the director's leap from documentary filmmaker to a genre film-maker claiming the film to be in a "minor genre, quite unworthy of his abilities". Franju responded to these comments claiming the film was his attempt to get the minor genre to be taken seriously. In England, Isabel Quigly, film critic for The Spectator, called it "the sickest film since I started film criticism", while a reviewer who admitted that she liked the film was nearly fired. A review in Variety was negative, noting specifically that the "stilted acting, asides to explain characters and motivations, and a repetition of effects lose the initial impact" and an "unclear progression and plodding direction give [the film] an old-fashioned air". The English Monthly Film Bulletin was of the opinion that "when a director as distinguished as Georges Franju makes a horror film...one cannot but feel tempted to search for symbols, an allegory, layers, or interpretation. Unhappily there is practically nothing in this inept work to offer any encouragement for doing so." The review said there was "a strange and poetic opening" and Schuftan's "haunting camerawork allies itself perfectly to Maurice Jarre's obsessive score" while" Brasseur and Valli were "sadly wasted" and that they "do what they can with almost non-existent characters".

Eyes Without a Face received a theatrical re-release in September 1986 in conjunction with retrospectives at the National Film Theatre in London and at the Cinémathèque Française for the film archive's 50th anniversary in France. As Franju was the archive's co-founder, the Cinémathèque Française celebrated by presenting the director's back catalogue. With the renewed interest, the film's critical reputation began to be re-evaluated. French critics' response to the film was significantly more positive than it was on its original release, with former editor-in-chief of Cahiers du cinéma Serge Daney calling the film "a marvel".

The film was re-released in its original and uncut form to American theaters on 31 October 2003. On Rotten Tomatoes, Eyes Without a Face has an approval rating of 97% from 60 reviews, with an average rating of 8.3/10. The critic consensus says "A horrific tale of guilt and obsession, Eyes Without a Face is just as chilling and poetic today as it was when it was first released". Metacritic, which uses a weighted average, assigned the film a score of 90 out of 100, based on 9 critics, indicating "universal acclaim". Many reviewers commented on the film's poetic nature and noted the strong influence of French poet and filmmaker Jean Cocteau. The Encyclopedia of Horror Films agreed with the assertion of Cocteau's influence, stating that "Franju invests [the film] with a weird poetry in which the influence of Cocteau is unmistakable". Jonathan Rosenbaum of the Chicago Reader praised the film, referring to it as "absurd and as beautiful as a fairy tale". J. Hoberman of The Village Voice declared the film "a masterpiece of poetic horror and tactful, tactile brutality". Roger Ebert of The Chicago Sun-Times gave the film a positive review, noting the fusion of film noir and surrealism, and writing: "It moved me because the daughter, once she understands what is happening, is more heartbroken over her father's victims than over her own fate." David Edelstein, writing for Slate, commented that "the storyline is your standard obsessed-mad-doctor saga, one step above a Poverty Row Bela Lugosi feature ... [b]ut it's Lugosi by way of Cocteau and Ionesco". In the 2010s, Time Out polled authors, directors, actors and critics who had worked in the horror genre to vote for their top horror films. Time Out placed Eyes Without a Face at number 34 on the top 100.

=== Home media ===
Eyes Without a Face was released on VHS on 9 January 2001 by Kino Video and on DVD on 19 October 2004 by the Criterion Collection. The DVD also contains Georges Franju's first documentary Blood of the Beasts (1949), a depiction of a French slaughterhouse. A Region 2 release of Eyes Without a Face was released on 21 April 2008 by Second Sight Films. A Region 4 edition of the film was released on 2 July 2007 by Umbrella Entertainment. The disc also included Franju's documentary Blood of the Beasts. In 2013, the Criterion Collection released the film on Blu-ray, this time transferred directly from the camera negative. In October 2025, the film received 4K UHD releases in the United Kingdom from the British Film Institute and in the United States from the Criterion Collection, the latter using a new 4K digital restoration.

== Legacy ==
The film has influenced other European films since its initial release. Spanish director Jesús Franco made films throughout his career that were influenced by Eyes Without a Face. Spanish director Pedro Almodóvar has stated his film The Skin I Live In (2011), which features a mad scientist who performs skin grafts and surgeries on an unwilling victim, was heavily influenced by Eyes Without a Face. Eyes without a Face is extensively referenced in the 2012 French film Holy Motors.

American film director John Carpenter has suggested that the film inspired the idea of a featureless mask for the Michael Myers character in the slasher film series Halloween. Carpenter recalls that the film crew "didn't have any money to make a mask. It was originally written the way you see it, in other words, it's a pale mask with human features, almost featureless. I don't know why I wrote that down, why Debra [Hill] and I decided on that, maybe it was because of an old movie called Eyes Without a Face."

Director Guillermo del Toro has also cited Eyes Without a Face as an influence on his work. Discussing the film, del Toro said that it strongly influenced him through its contrast between beauty and brutality, particularly the portrayal of Christiane as an ethereal figure amid graphic violence. The film has also been cited as an influence on George A. Romero. His film Bruiser (2000), in which the protagonist awakens with a featureless white face, has been linked to Christiane's blank mask in Eyes Without a Face.

In 2001, on VH1 Storytellers, singer Billy Idol cited the film as giving him the idea for his song "Eyes Without a Face". The song, which has the film's French title ("Les yeux sans visage") as a recurring line in the chorus, takes the father-daughter relationship from the film and recasts it as the deteriorated relationship between the narrator and his lover. The song became Idol's first top-10 hit in the U.S.

== See also ==
- List of French films of 1960
- List of Italian films of 1960
- List of horror films of 1960
- The Skin I Live In, a 2011 Spanish film by Pedro Almodovar that includes comparable narrative elements

== Bibliography ==
- Ashby, Justine; Higson, Andrew (2000). British Cinema: Past and Present. Routledge. ISBN 0-415-22061-0.
- Ince, Kate (2005). Georges Franju. Manchester University Press. ISBN 0-7190-6828-2.
- Hawkins, Joan (2000). Cutting Edge: Art-Horror and the Horrific Avant-Garde. University of Minnesota Press. ISBN 0-8166-3414-9.
- Schneider, Steven Jay (2005). 1001 Movies You Must See Before You Die. Barron's Educational Series. ISBN 0-7641-5907-0.
- Turan, Kenneth (2005). The X-list: The National Society of Film Critics' Guide to the Movies That Turn Us On. Da Capo Press. ISBN 0-306-81445-5.
- Hardy, Phil; Milne, Tom; Willemen, Paul (1986). The Encyclopedia of Horror Movies. Harper and Row. ISBN 0-06-055050-3.
- Munden, Kenneth White (1971). The American Film Institute Catalog of Motion Pictures Produced in the United States. University of California Press. ISBN 0-520-20970-2.
