= Deadly Record =

1959 British film by Lawrence Huntington

- Original British quad poster
- Directed by: Lawrence Huntington
- Screenplay by: Vivian A. Cox; Lawrence Huntington
- Produced by: Vivian A. CoxJulian Wintle; Leslie Parkyn
- Starring: Lee Patterson; Barbara Shelley; Jane Hylton; Peter Dyneley; Geoffrey Keen; John Paul
- Cinematography: Eric Cross
- Edited by: Eric Boyd-Perkins
- Music by: Neville Mcgrah
- Production company: Independent Artists
- Distributed by: Anglo-Amalgamated Film Distributors (UK)
- Release date: June 1959 (UK)
- Running time: 58 minutes
- Country: United Kingdom
- Language: English

Deadly Record is a 1959 British second feature crime drama directed by Lawrence Huntington, starring Lee Patterson and Barbara Shelley. It was written by Vivian A. Cox and Huntington based on the 1958 novel by Nina Warner Hooke. It aired in the US in the Kraft Mystery Theatre TV series.

== Plot ==
When airline pilot Trevor Hamilton's wife is murdered, he is wrongly accused of the crime.

== Cast ==
- Lee Patterson as Trevor Hamilton
- Barbara Shelley as Susan Webb
- Jane Hylton as Ann Garfield
- Peter Dyneley as Dr. Morrow
- Geoffrey Keen as Supt. Ambrose
- John Paul as Phil Gamage
- Everley Gregg as Mrs. Mac
- Edward Cast as Constable Ryder
- George Pastell as Angelo
- Ferdy Mayne as Ramon Casadas
- April Olrich as Carmela
- Percy Herbert as Belcher

== Critical reception ==
The Monthly Film Bulletin wrote: "A routine whodunit of the most familiar kind, but with a commodious bag of suspects and an air of brisk efficiency."

In British Sound Films: The Studio Years 1928–1959 David Quinlan rated the film as "average", writing: "Very familiar plot at least moves with pace and confidence."

DVD Beaver wrote "The film is better than most for this pleasurable genre of short Brit crime-thrillers. I will watch it again when the mood strikes."
