= Back to the Wall (film) =

1958 film

- Directed by: Édouard Molinaro
- Written by: François Chavane; Jean-Louis Roncoroni; Jean Redon; Frédéric Dard
- Based on: Délivrez-nous du mal by Frédéric Dard
- Produced by: François Chavane; Alain Poiré
- Starring: Jeanne Moreau; Gérard Oury; Philippe Nicaud
- Cinematography: Robert Lefebvre
- Edited by: Monique Isnardon; Robert Isnardon
- Music by: Richard Cornu
- Production company: Société Nouvelle des Établissements Gaumont
- Distributed by: Gaumont
- Release date: 7 March 1958
- Running time: 93 minutes
- Country: France
- Language: French

Back to the Wall (French: Le dos au mur) is a 1958 French crime drama film directed by Édouard Molinaro and starring Jeanne Moreau, Gérard Oury and Philippe Nicaud. It was shot at the Saint-Maurice Studios in Paris and on location around the city. The film's sets were designed by the art director Georges Lévy.

== Synopsis ==
Jacques Decret, a wealthy industrialist, discovers that his wife Gloria is having an affair with a younger man, Yves. Decret begins to send her blackmail letters, elaborately planting the suspicion in Gloria's mind that they were written by Yves. Confronting Yves after finding seemingly incriminating evidence alongside a pistol, Gloria accidentally shoots Yves. Gloria confesses her affair and the homicide to Decret, who feigns ignorance and disposes of Yves' body by encasing it in a concrete wall. Months pass, the marriage has returned to a new normal, but Gloria accidentally finds evidence that Decret had framed Yves, and commits suicide after sending a letter to the police implicating her husband in her lover's death.

== Cast ==
- Jeanne Moreau as Gloria Decrey
- Gérard Oury as Jacques Decrey
- Philippe Nicaud as Yves Normand
- Claire Maurier as Ghislaine
- Gérard Buhr as Mario
- George Cusin as Le commissaire de police
- Robert Bazil as Un inspecteur de police
- Jean Degrave as Le bijoutier
- Richard Francoeur as Un invité des Decrey
- Françoise Honorat as Un invité des Decrey
- Joëlle Janin as Une secrétaire
- Robert Le Béal as Me Lombard, l'avocat
- Micheline Luccioni as La postière
- Pascal Mazzotti as Jérôme
- Jacqueline Noëlle as L'entraîneuse
- Philippe Olive as Henri
- Jean Lefebvre as Mauvin
- Colette Renard as Josiane Mauvin
- Jean-Marie Rivière as Paul

== Bibliography ==
- Bessy, Maurice & Chirat, Raymond. Histoire du cinéma français: 1956-1960. Pygmalion, 1986.
- Rège, Philippe. Encyclopedia of French Film Directors, Volume 1. Scarecrow Press, 2009.
