= Anthony Marlowe (actor) =

British actor (1913–1975)

- Born: Thomas Fernando Perredita; 12 October 1913; Holborn, London, United Kingdom
- Died: 10 November 1975 (aged 62); Chelsea, London, United Kingdom
- Other name: Thomas Fernando Perredita
- Occupation: Actor
- Years active: 1946-1969 (film & TV)

Anthony Marlowe (12 October 1913 – 10 November 1975) was a British stage, film and television actor. His most notable screen role was as Geoffrey Stock in the ITV crime series Ghost Squad between 1962 and 1964. He made guest appearances in various other shows including Armchair Theatre, No Hiding Place, Randall and Hopkirk, The Rat Catchers, Rex Milligan and United!.

He appeared in a number of West End plays including Murder Mistaken. In 1948 he was described as "an actor with a fine, cool quality".

== Personal life and death ==
On 11 September 1939, Marlowe married the stage actress (Pamela) Merelina Watts. Together, they had a daughter, the actress Fernanda Marlowe.

On 31 October 1975, Marlowe was involved in a motoring accident, where a pedestrian was injured. Upset so much by this and suffering from depression for the past six months, the actor committed suicide. He was found dead at 12.30pm on 10 November 1975 with half a bottle of whiskey and some tablets beside his bed. The verdict of death was recorded as a massive dose of barbiturate poisoning.

== Selected filmography ==
- Captain Horatio Hornblower (1951)
- Ghost Ship (1952)
- Doctor in the House (1954)
- Room in the House (1955)

== Bibliography ==
- Mann, Dave. Britain's First TV/film Crime Series and the Industrialisation of Its Film Industry, 1946-1964. Edwin Mellen Press, 2009.
- Wearing, J.P. The London Stage 1950–1959: A Calendar of Productions, Performers, and Personnel. Rowman & Littlefield, 2014.
