= Vernon Sewell =

British actor and film director (1903–2001)

- Vernon Sewell, left, filming Curse of the Crimson Altar (1968) with Christopher Lee and Boris Karloff
- Born: Vernon Campbell Sewell; 4 July 1903; London, England, United Kingdom
- Died: 21 June 2001 (aged 97); Durban, South Africa, Africa
- Occupations: Film director, writer, producer
- Years active: 1933–1971
- Spouse: Joan Carol

Vernon Campbell Sewell (4 July 1903 – 21 June 2001) was a British film director, writer, producer and, briefly, an actor.

Sewell was born in London, England, and was educated at Marlborough College. He directed more than 30 films during his career, starting with Morgenrot (1933) and ending with Burke & Hare (1971). He worked chiefly in B-movies, some of which were, according to the BFI Screenonline, "well above the usual cut-price standards of film-making at this level." He made a number of films for Anglo-Amalgamated.

Sewell was married to the actress Joan Carol (born Joan Roscoe Catt 1905–1986) in 1950. He died on 21 June 2001 in Durban, South Africa, at age 97.

== Filmography (director) ==
- 1934: The Medium
- 1937: A Test for Love
- 1938: Breakers Ahead
- 1939: What Men Live By
- 1943: The Silver Fleet
- 1945: The World Owes Me a Living
- 1945: Latin Quarter
- 1947: The Ghosts of Berkeley Square
- 1948: Uneasy Terms
- 1949: The Jack of Diamonds
- 1951: The Dark Light
- 1951: Black Widow
- 1952: The Floating Dutchman
- 1952: Ghost Ship
- 1953: Counterspy
- 1954: Dangerous Voyage
- 1954: Radio Cab Murder
- 1955: Where There's a Will
- 1956: Johnny, You're Wanted
- 1956: Soho Incident (aka Spin a Dark Web)
- 1956: Home and Away
- 1957: Rogue's Yarn
- 1958: Battle of the V-1
- 1959: Wrong Number
- 1960: Urge to Kill
- 1961: House of Mystery
- 1961: The Wind of Change
- 1961: The Man in the Back Seat
- 1962: Strongroom
- 1963: A Matter of Choice
- 1963: Strictly for the Birds
- 1967: Some May Live
- 1968: The Blood Beast Terror
- 1968: Curse of the Crimson Altar
- 1971: Burke & Hare
