= Ferdy Mayne =

German-British actor (1916–1998)

- Born: Ferdinand Philip Mayer-Horckel; 11 March 1916; Mainz, Germany
- Died: 30 January 1998 (aged 81); West Sussex, England
- Education: Royal Academy of Dramatic Art; Old Vic School
- Occupation: Actor
- Years active: 1943–1996
- Spouse: Deirdre de Payer (m. 1955; div. 1972)
- Children: 2, including Belinda

Ferdy Mayne (born Ferdinand Philip Mayer-Horckel; 11 March 1916 – 30 January 1998), also spelled Ferdie Mayne, was a German-British actor. Born in Mainz, he emigrated to the United Kingdom in the early 1930s to escape the Nazi regime. He resided in the UK for the majority of his professional career.

Working almost continuously throughout a 60-year-long career, Mayne was known as a versatile character actor, often playing suave villains and aristocratic eccentrics in films like The Fearless Vampire Killers, Where Eagles Dare, Barry Lyndon, and Benefit of the Doubt. He also appeared in many West End plays.

== Early life and education ==
Ferdinand Philip Mayer-Horckel was born in Mainz, Germany, on 11 March 1916. His German father was the judge of Mainz, while his half-English mother was a singing instructor.

Because his family was Jewish, a teenage Mayne was sent to Britain in 1932 to protect him from the Nazis. He stayed with his aunt, Li Osborne (1883–1968), nee Luisa Friedericka Wolf, a well-known German theatre and film portrait photographer. Just a few years previously, she fled Germany for England, married, became Li Hutchinson-Wolf, and, as a noted sculptor, used the name Lee Hutchinson. Mayne obtained British citizenship. His parents were detained briefly in Buchenwald but, due to his mother's British family connections, were able to leave Germany for Britain, where they settled permanently. He was educated at Frensham Heights School, and studied acting at the Royal Academy of Dramatic Art and the Bristol Old Vic Theatre School.

At the start of the Second World War, Mayne operated as an informant for MI5. Significant clues to his secret service work were provided by Joan Miller in her posthumously published memoir One Girl's War (1986). Mayne had served as a witness at her marriage in 1945. He also recorded German-language propaganda broadcasts for the BBC Overseas Service.

== Career ==
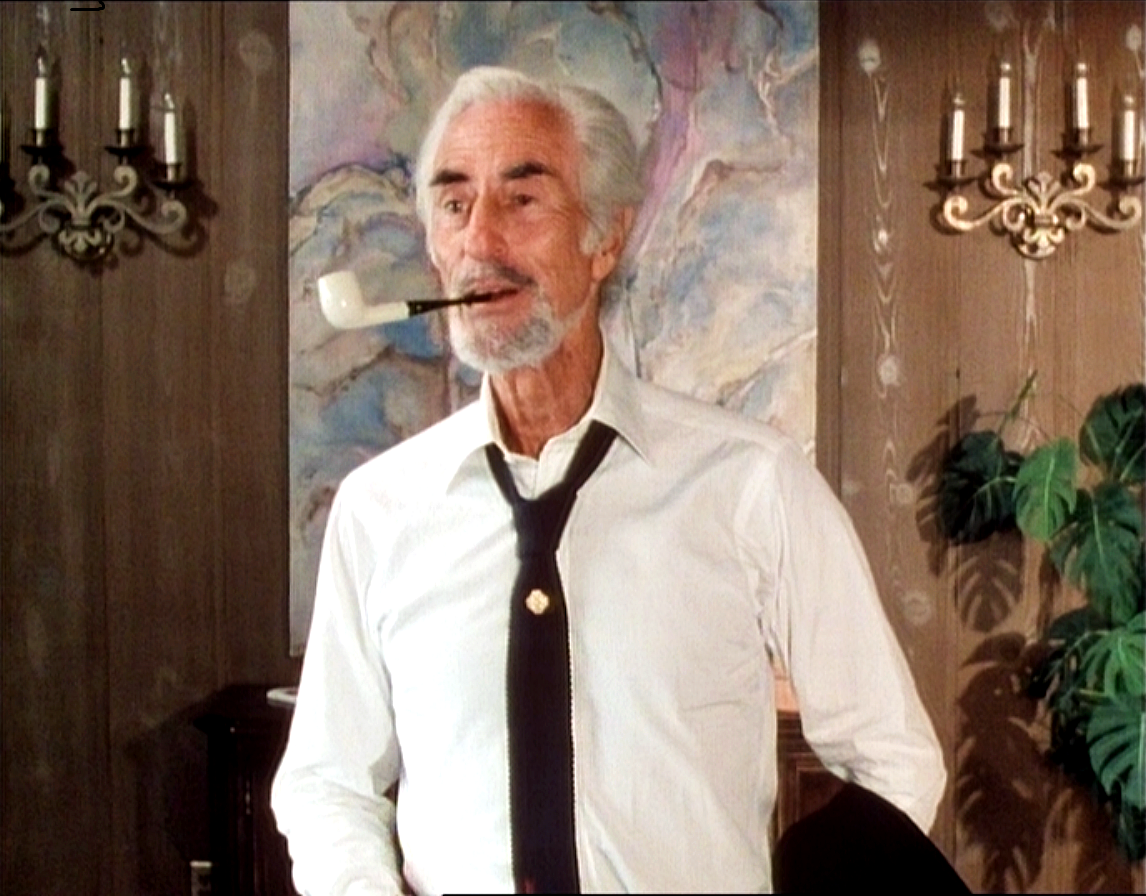
Ferdy Mayne in The Optimist (1983)

Mayne appeared in 230 films and television programmes.

In 1958 he appeared in the fifth episode of The Diary of Samuel Pepys.

In 1960 he appeared in the fourth Danger Man episode entitled "The Blue Veil".

In 1967, he achieved international recognition in his role as Count von Krolock in Roman Polanski's The Fearless Vampire Killers.

In 1977, he appeared in "It Pays to Advertise", an episode of Are You Being Served?, in the role of "The Ten Pound Perfume".

Later, Mayne moved to the United States and played the semi-regular role of Albert Grand in the TV series Cagney and Lacey.

In 1983, he played the role of Ludwig Rosenthal, a wealthy Jewish merchant persecuted and dispossessed by the Nazis, in Winds of War, a television miniseries based on the eponymous novel by Herman Wouk.

== Personal life ==
In 1955, Mayne married actress Deirdre de Payer. Their daughter Belinda Mayne is also an actress. They also adopted a daughter, Fernanda, in 1965. The couple divorced in 1972.

=== Illness and death ===
In the 1990s, Mayne developed Parkinson's disease, and moved back to England. He died in West Sussex on 30 January 1998, aged 81.

== Partial filmography ==
- 1943 The Life and Death of Colonel Blimp as Prussian Student (uncredited)
- 1943 Warn That Man as German Radio Operator (uncredited)
- 1943 Old Mother Riley Overseas
- 1944 English Without Tears (uncredited)
- 1945 Meet Sexton Blake! as "Slant-Eyes"
- 1945 Waltz Time as Max
- 1945 The Echo Murders as Dacier
- 1948 One Night with You as First Detective
- 1948 Broken Journey as Pelotti
- 1949 Vote for Huggett as Waiter
- 1949 The Temptress as Julian
- 1949 The Huggetts Abroad as Gendarme (uncredited)
- 1949 Celia as Antonio
- 1950 Prelude to Fame as Carlo Ferugia
- 1950 Cairo Road as Doctor In Port Said
- 1951 Hotel Sahara as Yusef
- 1951 Encore as Headwaiter (segment "Gigolo and Gigolette")
- 1951 Venetian Bird as Tio
- 1952 Made in Heaven as István
- 1952 The Man Who Watched Trains Go By as Louis
- 1953 The Broken Horseshoe as Charles Constance
- 1953 Three Steps to the Gallows as Mario Satargo
- 1953 Desperate Moment as Detective Laurence
- 1953 Epitaph for a Spy as Köche
- 1953 The Captain's Paradise as The Sheikh
- 1953 The Blue Parrot as Stevens
- 1953 Marilyn as Nicky Everton
- 1954 You Know What Sailors Are as Stanislaus Voritz of Smorznigov
- 1954 Malaga as Mustapha
- 1954 Twist of Fate as Police Chief
- 1954 Betrayed as Luftwaffe Officer (uncredited)
- 1954 Third Party Risk as Maxwell Carey
- 1954 The Divided Heart as Dr. Muller
- 1955 The Glass Cage as Bertie
- 1955 Value for Money as Waiter
- 1955 Gentlemen Marry Brunettes as M. Dufond
- 1955 Storm Over the Nile as Dr. Harraz
- 1956 The Narrowing Circle as Bill Strayte
- 1956 The Baby and the Battleship as Interpreter
- 1956 Find the Lady as Tony Del Roma
- 1957 You Pay Your Money as Delal
- 1957 Seven Waves Away as Solly Daniels
- 1957 The Big Chance as Dimitri Aperghis
- 1957 Three Sundays to Live as Davis
- 1957 The End of the Line as Charles Edwards
- 1957 Blue Murder at St Trinian's as Italian Police Inspector
- 1958 The Safecracker as Greek Ship Owner
- 1958 A Woman of Mystery as Andre
- 1958 The Big Money as Furrier
- 1958 Next to No Time as Mario
- 1959 Deadly Record as Ramon Casadas
- 1959 Third Man on the Mountain as Andreas Krickel
- 1959 Ben-Hur as Captain of Rescue Ship (uncredited)
- 1959 Tommy the Toreador as Lopez
- 1959 Our Man in Havana as Professor Sanchez
- 1960 The Spider's Web as Oliver
- 1960 Crossroads to Crime as Miles
- 1961 The Green Helmet as Rossano
- 1961 Highway to Battle as Ziegler
- 1962 Three Spare Wives as Fazim Bey
- 1962 Masters of Venus as Votan
- 1962 Freud: The Secret Passion (uncredited)
- 1962 The Password Is Courage as 1st German Officer At French Farm
- 1963 Come Fly with Me as Vienna Hotel Clerk (uncredited)
- 1963 Der Schwur des Soldaten Pooley as Intelligence Officer
- 1963 Shadow of Treason as Mario
- 1964 The Counterfeit Constable as José, l'agent de Diana Dors
- 1965 Operation Crossbow as German Officer
- 1965 Those Magnificent Men in Their Flying Machines as French Official (uncredited)
- 1965 Promise Her Anything as Vittorio Fettucini
- 1967 The Bobo as Silvestre Flores
- 1967 The Fearless Vampire Killers as Count Von Krolock / The Narrator
- 1967 Les grandes vacances as MacFarrell
- 1968 Gates to Paradise as Count Ludovic de Vendôme
- 1968 Where Eagles Dare as General Julius Rosemeyer
- 1968 The Limbo Line as Sutcliffe
- 1969 The Best House in London (uncredited)
- 1969 The Magic Christian as Edouard
- 1970 The Adventurers as Sergei's Father
- 1970 The Walking Stick as Douglas Dainton
- 1970 Vertige pour un tueur (uncredited)
- 1970 The Vampire Lovers as Doctor
- 1971 When Eight Bells Toll as Lavorski
- 1971 Gebissen wird nur nachts or The Vampire Happening as Count Dracula
- 1971 Von Richthofen and Brown as Richthofen's Father
- 1971 The Blonde in the Blue Movie as Professor Grutekoor
- 1971 Jo as Mr. Grunder
- 1972 Eagle in a Cage as Count Bertrand
- 1972 Au Pair Girls as Sheik El Abab
- 1972 Innocent Bystanders as Marcus Kaplan
- 1972 Il tema di Marco
- 1973 Trip to Vienna as Mariu Moltenau
- 1974 Die Ameisen kommen as Michel
- 1975 To the Bitter End as Wallace
- 1975 Barry Lyndon as Colonel Bulow
- 1976 Silence in the Forest as Baron Sternfeld
- 1976 The Eagle Has Landed as Radl's Doctor (uncredited)
- 1978 Fedora as First Director
- 1978 Revenge of the Pink Panther as Dr. Paul Laprone
- 1978 The Pirate (TV film) as Jabir
- 1979 A Man Called Intrepid (TV film) as Alexander Korda
- 1979 Mihail, câine de circ as Dr. Emory
- 1979 The Music Machine as Basil Silverman
- 1980 Hawk the Slayer as Old Man, Father of Hawk and Voltan
- 1980 The Formula as Professor Siebold
- 1981 Levkas Man as Borg
- 1981 Longshot as Ralph Zipper
- 1982 The Greatest American Hero as Marco
- 1982 Hart to Hart as Kasim
- 1983 The Optimist as The Father
- 1983 Frightmare as Conrad Radzoff
- 1983 The Black Stallion Returns as Abu Ben Ishak
- 1983 Yellowbeard as Mr. Beamish
- 1984 Conan the Destroyer as The Leader
- 1984 The Secret Diary of Sigmund Freud as Herr Herrmann
- 1985 Night Train to Terror as God (segment "The Night Train")
- 1985 Hot Chili as Mr. Houston
- 1985 Howling II: Your Sister Is a Werewolf as Erle
- 1986 Pirates as Captain Linares
- 1987 Pehavý Max a strasidlá as Dracula
- 1988 The Choice
- 1988 Magdalene as Archbishop
- 1990 In the Shadow of the Sandcastle
- 1991 My Lovely Monster as Cowboy / Vampire
- 1992 Knight Moves as Jeremy Edmonds
- 1992 The Tigress as The Austrian Count
- 1993 Benefit of the Doubt as Mueller
- 1993 Warlock: The Armageddon as One-Eyed Man
- 1995 The Killers Within as General Karl Von Weber (final film role)
- 1997 An Unknown Encounter: A True Account of the San Pedro Haunting as Himself (narrator)*
- 2016 Chief Zabu as Seth the Butler (filmed in 1986)
