= The Spies (TV series) =

1966 British TV spy series

- Created by: John Gould
- Starring: Dinsdale Landen; Simon Oates; Peter Arne
- Country of origin: United Kingdom
- No. of series: 1
- No. of episodes: 15

Production
- Producer: Terence Dudley
- Running time: 50 minutes

Original release
- Network: BBC1
- Release: 1 January – 16 April 1966

The Spies is a British fifteen-part television series produced by the BBC in 1966. The main stars are Dinsdale Landen as counter espionage agent Richard Cadell; Simon Oates as agent Anthony Kelly; and Peter Arne as Russian agent Copic.

A spin-off or rebranding of the previous 1965 series The Mask of Janus, The Spies was a more conventional espionage thriller series than its predecessor, being more explicitly concerned with the actual operations of British secret service agents stationed in the fictional European country Amalia. The series can be viewed as being a BBC attempt to match the popularity of the ITV action show Danger Man.

Most of this show was wiped (probably in the 1970s) by the BBC; only one episode is known to exist according to www.lostshows.com.
