= Garfield Morgan =

English actor (1931–2009)

- Born: Thomas Timothy Garfield Morgan; 19 April 1931; Birmingham, England
- Died: 5 December 2009 (aged 78); London, England
- Years active: 1956–2007
- Spouse: Dilys Laye (m. 1963, divorced)

Thomas Timothy Garfield Morgan (19 April 1931 – 5 December 2009) was an English actor who appeared mostly on television and occasionally in films. He had a regular role in The Sweeney as Detective Chief Inspector Frank Haskins.

== Early life ==
Born in Birmingham, Warwickshire, Morgan began acting with a youth club drama group in Erdington where he grew up. He apprenticed as a dental mechanic before enrolling into drama school.

== Career ==
Morgan started his acting career with the Arena Theatre, Birmingham. He then went on to be Director of Productions at the UI Marlowe Theatre, Canterbury from 1957 to 1958 and then at Manchester's Library Theatre 1959 to 1960. He was associate director of the Northcott Theatre 1976 to 1978 and associate director of the Nottingham Playhouse in 1978.

Beginning to act on television in 1955, Morgan made hundreds of appearances in many shows. He played Detective Chief Inspector Gwyn Lewis in the first series of the BBC police series Softly, Softly, but his best remembered role was as Detective Chief Inspector Frank Haskins in the Euston Films/Thames Television's British crime series of the 1970s, The Sweeney. He appeared in all four series of the programme.

Morgan appeared in two episodes of Randall and Hopkirk (Deceased): "The House on Haunted Hill" and “You Can Always Find a Fall Guy”, both 1969.

Morgan continued to perform in character roles on TV. He made guest appearances in Hallelujah!, No Job for a Lady and Shelley.

Morgan also appeared in Bad Girls, Callan, Crown Court, Dangerfield, Dear Mother...Love Albert, Dixon of Dock Green, Dr. Finlay's Casebook, George and Mildred, Heartbeat, Holby City, Lovejoy, Minder, No Hiding Place, On the Buses, Paul Temple, Public Eye, Redcap, Sergeant Cork, Shelley, Special Branch, Sutherland's Law, The Avengers, The Bill, The Gentle Touch, The Likely Lads, The Persuaders!, The Saint, The Troubleshooters and Z-Cars.

His film roles included The Odessa File and 28 Weeks Later.

== Personal life ==
Morgan married the actress Dilys Laye in 1963 but the marriage was later dissolved. He listed his hobbies as golf, photography and riding (show-jumping and eventing). Morgan died from cancer on 5 December 2009.

== Filmography ==
- The Intimate Stranger (1956) - Waiter (uncredited)
- Der Schwur des Soldaten Pooley (1961) - Albert Pooley
- A Prize of Arms (1962) - MP with Dog
- Two Letter Alibi (1962) - Foreman of the Jury (uncredited)
- On the Run (1963) - Meredith
- The Undesirable Neighbour (1963), part of The Scales of Justice series of featurettes - Mr. Andrews (a barrister)
- The Informers (1963) - 2nd Inspector (uncredited)
- Our Mother's House (1967) - Mr. Moley
- Perfect Friday (1970) - 1st Airport Official
- To Catch a Spy (1971) - The Husband
- Bel Ami (1971) - Jacques Rivat
- Henry VIII and His Six Wives (1972) - Gardiner
- Digby, the Biggest Dog in the World (1973) - Rogerson
- The Odessa File (1974) - Israeli General
- George and Mildred (1980) - Jim Bridges
- Out of Order (1987) - Drill Sergeant
- The Englishman Who Went Up a Hill But Came Down a Mountain (1995) - Davies the School
- 28 Weeks Later (2007) - Geoff (final film role)
