= The Manster =

1959 film by George Breakston and Kenneth G. Crane

- Japanese theatrical release poster
- Directed by: George P. Breakston; Kenneth G. Crane
- Screenplay by: Walter J. Sheldon
- Story by: George P. Breakston
- Produced by: George P. Breakston
- Starring: Peter Dyneley; Jane Hylton; Tetsu Nakamura; Terri Zimmern; Norman Van Hawley; Toyoko Takechi; Jerry Ito
- Cinematography: David Mason
- Edited by: Kenneth G. Crane
- Music by: Hirooki Ogawa
- Production companies: United Artists; Shaw-Breakston Enterprises
- Distributed by: Lopert Pictures
- Release dates: 10 July 1959 (Tokyo); 28 March 1962 (U.S.)
- Running time: 72 minutes
- Country: United States
- Language: English

The Manster (1959) by George P. Breakston and Kenneth G. Crane

The Manster is a 1959 American science-fiction horror film directed by George P. Breakston (who also produced the film and wrote the story) and Kenneth G. Crane. The film stars Peter Dyneley as a foreign correspondent in Japan who is given an experimental drug which causes an eye, and eventually a second head, to grow from his shoulder. Tetsu Nakamura plays the mad scientist and Terri Zimmern his assistant, Tara. Jane Hylton also stars as Dyneley's wife.

== Plot ==
American foreign news correspondent Larry Stanford has spent time in Tokyo and explains to his boss and friend Ian that he looks forward to going home to his wife Linda and the US. His final assignment is to interview reclusive scientist Dr. Robert Suzuki, who lives atop a volcanic mountain.

The doctor has discovered that human evolutionary alterations may be naturally caused by sporadic atmospheric conditions but change by chemical means is also possible. Suzuki's few experiments to date have gone very wrong: his last experiment resulted in a serial-killing beast, which Suzuki had to destroy. Despite these failures, the doctor has invented a new and better formula and needs only a subject on which to test it.

In response to Larry's inquiries, Suzuki amiably steers the conversation to asking some personal questions such as age and health status, upon which the doctor decides that Larry is a suitable test subject. The doctor's assistant Tara opposes performing the experiment without Larry's knowledge or consent but Suzuki counters with the view that the scientific knowledge to be gained outweighs the ethical considerations.

Suzuki sedates Larry with a drugged drink and injects his formula into Larry, beginning a long process of personality and physical change. Instead of returning to the US as expected, or returning to work, Larry now spends his time inebriated and accompanying Suzuki out on the town, and beginning an affair with Tara.

Linda, confused and concerned and unable to contact her husband, travels to Japan. Larry abruptly tells Linda that their marriage is over and he wants a new life with Tara.

Larry wanders into a temple where a Buddhist monk is praying. Larry attempts to pour out his confusion and frustrations but the monk does not understand English, leading to Stanford killing the monk and stealing his prayer bracelet.

Ian makes several attempts to understand and help Larry, including introducing him to Doctor Jensen, the best psychiatrist in Tokyo, but he rages to Ian to leave him alone. After Ian leaves, Larry examines the spot on his right shoulder where Suzuki injected him and, to his horror, sees that an eyeball has grown there and opens to stare back at Larry, while his right hand has become a claw.

Larry goes on a killing rampage, murdering lone people he finds in the Tokyo streets at night. He arrives at Doctor Jensen's home office, pounds on the door and then breaks in; the psychiatrist phones the police but before they can arrive, Larry murders him.

Ian finds the incriminating prayer bracelet and takes it to the police, who are also concerned about the unusual rash of street murders. They stake out locations where Stanford might be found. Larry kills several police and again evades capture. To his further horror, the eye on his shoulder has now evolved into a complete and separate head. Larry then makes his way to Suzuki's laboratory.

Suzuki informs Tara that he has developed a remedy capable of causing the monster and Larry Stanford to physically split; unconvinced, she gives Suzuki a knife, implying that he should commit seppuku or ritual suicide to atone for his actions. Instead, Suzuki murders his other failed experiment, a monster that was once his wife Emiko.

When Stanford enters the lab, Suzuki is able to inject him with his new formula. Stanford again goes on a rampage, killing Suzuki and destroying the lab, then carrying an unconscious Tara to the volcano. Suzuki's new formula takes effect and Larry undergoes physical fission, splitting into two beings - one looks like the old Larry while the other is monstrous and sub-human.

The monstrous being grabs Tara and throws her into the volcano. As Ian, Linda and the police arrive, Larry pushes his grotesque self into the volcano after Tara. The police arrest the now traumatised Larry as Ian and Linda ponder on the nature of good and evil and the level of Larry's guilt in the events that consumed him.

== Cast ==
- Peter Dyneley as Larry Stanford
- Jane Hylton as Linda Stanford
- Tetsu Nakamura as Dr. Robert Suzuki
- Terri Zimmern as Tara
- Jerry Ito as Police Supt. Aida
- Norman Van Hawley as Ian Matthews
- Toyoko Takechi as Emiko Suzuki
- Kenzo Kuroki as Genji Suzuki
- Alan Tarlton as Dr. H. B. Jennsen
- Shinpei Takagi as Temple Priest
- George Wyman as the Monster

== Production ==
The Manster was an American production filmed in Japan, using a mostly Japanese crew and a number of Japanese actors. It was part of a series of B-movies shot in Japan for American producers by George Breakston, beginning with 1951's Tokyo File 212. Filming took place in English, and Canadian-born Tetsu Nakamura and American-born Jerry Ito were cast in key roles due to their bilingualism. Most of the financing came from United Artists. who distributed the film through its subsidiary Lopert Pictures.

The film was based on a story by Breakston, originally titled The Split.

Terri Zimmern was cast when the filmmakers were in Hong Kong. This was the only film she ever apppeared in.

The film had several working titles, including Nightmare and The Two-Headed Monster. The latter was used as the title for the film's Japanese release. It was photographed by David Mason and edited by Kenneth G. Crane. Shinpei Takagi handled the special effects, George Wyman played the titular monster and Hirooki Ogawa composed the soundtrack. Ryukichi Aimono and Robert Perkins were associate producers. Noboru Miyakuni was the art director.

== Release ==
The Manster was released in Japan on July 10, 1959 in Tokyo, under the title The Two-Headed Killer (双頭の殺人鬼, Sōtō no Satsujinki).

Lopert Pictures released The Manster in the United States on March 28, 1962 as a double feature with Eyes Without a Face. In the United Kingdom, The Manster was released as The Split. The American Film Institute also states that the film premiered in the United States in San Francisco on March 28, 1962, at a run time of 72 minutes.

The film was shown on Elvira's Movie Macabre and later released on DVD.

== Reception ==
In a contemporary review, the Monthly Film Bulletin reviewed a 67-minute version of The Manster titled The Split. The review called the film to be "a pathetic pot-boiler", "never frightening" and an "incredibly far-fetched rehash of all the ingredients of the convention SF-horror film". The review criticized the fact that the second head of the character appears to only "bob up and down on the actor's raincoated shoulder, only visible in night scenes and never in close-up".

In a retrospective review, AllMovie film critic Hal Erickson wrote, "Manster is a favorite among campy horror aficionados and for good reason as it is both unintentionally funny and genuinely creepy...Wait till you see the climax, with the hero battling himself on the edge of a live volcano".

== Influence ==
The Manster inspired a sequence in Sam Raimi's film Army of Darkness (1992), in which a monster grows out of Ash Williams' (Bruce Campbell) shoulder.

== Footnotes ==
=== References ===
- Erickson, Hal. "The Manster (1959)". AllMovie. Archived from the original on October 22, 2012.
- Galbraith IV, Stuart (1996). The Japanese Filmography: 1900 through 1994. McFarland. ISBN 0-7864-0032-3.
