= Susan Burnet =

British actress (1938–2010)

- Born: 25 November 1938; Salisbury, Southern Rhodesia
- Died: 17 January 2010 (aged 71); London, England
- Education: London Academy of Music and Dramatic Art
- Occupation: Actress

Susan Burnet (25 November 1938 – 17 January 2010) was a British actress born in Salisbury, Southern Rhodesia (which later became Harare, Zimbabwe). The granddaughter of one of Rhodesia's first pioneers, she later became an opponent of Ian Smith's UDI government, refusing to shake Smith's hand when they were introduced and protesting against his policies. She died on 17 January 2010 in London, England.

== Education and career ==
After winning a scholarship to LAMDA at the age of 15 she had a brief but successful career in British television, film and on stage. Critics likened her looks to Brigitte Bardot's.

She met her husband, the actor Andrew Ray, in her first role after stage school, the West End play Flowering Cherry, which also starred Ralph Richardson and Celia Johnson. Despite the initial objections of his father, comedian Ted Ray, who thought they were too young, the couple married in 1959. They separated in the 1970s but never divorced. Burnet, who took her husband's real name Olden, largely retired from acting after giving birth to their first child at the age of 24 and returned to her homeland.
