= Latin Quarter (1945 film) =

- British theatrical poster
- Directed by: Vernon Sewell
- Written by: Vernon Sewell
- Based on: play L'Angoisse by Pierre Mills; C. Vylars
- Produced by: Louis H. Jackson
- Starring: Derrick De Marney; Joan Greenwood; Beresford Egan
- Cinematography: Günther Krampf
- Edited by: Lito Carruthers
- Music by: Allan Gray
- Production company: British National Films
- Distributed by: Anglo-American Films
- Release date: 16 October 1945
- Running time: 80 minutes
- Country: United Kingdom
- Language: English

Latin Quarter (U.S. title: Frenzy) is a 1945 British film directed by Vernon Sewell and starring Derrick De Marney, Joan Greenwood and Beresford Egan. It was written by Sewell adapted from the play L'Angoisse by Pierre Mills and C. Vylars. It was Sewell's second film version of the story, following The Medium in 1934. It was made by British National Films at their studios in Elstree.

Sewell called it "a very very artistic movie."

== Plot ==
In the Paris of 1893, sculptor Charles Garrie enters into an illicit relationship with the married Christine Minetti. Christine's husband Anton also a sculptor, and mentally unstable. Anton finds out about Christine's affair and soon after she vanishes without trace. Although the police consider Anton the prime suspect in being involved in his wife's disappearance, they can find no incriminating evidence, nor any lead as to her whereabouts, alive or dead.

Anton's mental deterioration gathers pace, and in due course he is arrested for the murder of his mistress and in this case there is no doubt of his guilt. He still refuses however to give any indication of what happened to Christine. Charles remains desperate to discover Christine's fate, and relates the whole story to a criminologist. A psychic is called in and a séance is held in Anton's studio, revealing that Christine has always been much closer to home than anyone could have realised.

== Cast ==
- Derrick De Marney as Charles Garrie
- Beresford Egan as Anton Minetti
- Joan Greenwood as Christine Minetti
- Frederick Valk as Dr. Ivan Krasner
- Sybille Binder as Mme. Cordova
- Joan Seton as Lucille Lindbeck
- Lily Kann as Maria
- Valentine Dyall as prefect of police
- Gerhard Kempinski as sergeant
- Espinosa as ballet master
- Margaret Clarke as ballet mistress
- Bruce Winston as Jo-Jo
- Anthony Hawtrey as specialist
- Martin Miller as morgue keeper

== Reception ==
The Monthly Film Bulletin wrote: "a This melodrama, originally written for the stage, makes a very poor film. It is permeated with artificiality and recalls in so many ways the bad old days of the British film at its worst as to be disturbing to anyone who hoped they were a thing of the past. Two minor parts, the concierge of Lily Kann and the morgue keeper of Martin Miller, are alone played in tune with the film's intentions: the rest are in varying degrees inadequate. The settings reek of the studio, the development of the story is faltering, and the direction is limp and unimaginative."

Picturegoer wrote: "Macabre murder mystery set in a convincing Paris which reflects credit on all concerned with its production. It makes no pretensions to be a 'super,' but certainly provides good melodramatic entertainment."

Picture Show wrote: "Although it is a little slow and artificial until it gets into its stride, it gathers momentum and towards the end it is really exciting and has a hair-raising climax. Intelligently acted and directed."
