= Mickey Dunne =

1967 British TV comedy series

- Annette Andre and Dinsdale Landen
- Starring: Dinsdale Landen
- Country of origin: United Kingdom
- Original language: English
- No. of series: 1
- No. of episodes: 13

Production
- Producer: John Frankau
- Running time: 50 minutes
- Production company: BBC Television

Original release
- Release: 8 May – 7 August 1967

Mickey Dunne is a lost 1967 British television comedy series produced by the BBC. It ran for one series of 13 episodes.

== Synopsis ==
The programme stars Dinsdale Landen as Mickey Dunne, a 28-year-old cockney wide boy, gambler and womaniser who lives on his wits, loosely styled on the title character of the 1966 Michael Caine film Alfie.

The Radio Times described Dunne as: "a loner and a loser, but without bitterness. He always bounces back like a rubber ball after every disaster. Mickey’s got just one problem: his heart’s too big."

== Cast ==
Each self-contained episode featured a different supporting cast, with several well-known actors appearing including Michael Balfour, Nigel Davenport, Clive Dunn, Liz Fraser, Judy Geeson, Georgina Hale, John Junkin, Julian Orchard and Penny Spencer.

== Episodes ==
1. "Big Fleas, Little Fleas"
2. "If Anyone Calls – I'm in the Doghouse"
3. "The Tar Baby"
4. "My Pal Fred"
5. "Yes – But Can He Go The Distance?"
6. "No Flowers by Request"
7. "Come on in, the Water's Fine"
8. "A Handful of Coloured Chalks"
9. "Over the Hill"
10. "The Hon. Bird"
11. "The Stationary Tenants"
12. "You Scratch My Back, I'll Scratch Yours"
13. "Are there any More at Home Like You?"

== Production ==
Because of the for the time risqué subject material the programme was broadcast in a late evening slot: 9:40–10:30pm.

The theme song was recorded by Vince Hill.

== Archive status ==
The TV archive organisation Kaleidoscope lists all episodes as lost.
