= John Paul (actor) =

English actor (1921–1995)

- Born: John Middleton Lankester Paul; 20 April 1921; Middlesex, England
- Died: 23 February 1995 (aged 73); Buckinghamshire, England
- Occupation: Actor
- Spouse: Jean Kendall
- Children: 5

John Middleton Lankester Paul (20 April 1921 – 23 February 1995) was an English actor. He is best known for his television roles, particularly as Dr Spencer Quist in Doomwatch (1970–1972) and Marcus Agrippa in I, Claudius (1976), both for BBC Television.

== Career ==
An early role for Paul was as the lead in the ITV series Probation Officer in the early 1960s. He appeared as Captain Flint in a BBC adaptation of Arthur Ransome's Swallows and Amazons in 1963. He had guest roles in episodes of popular television series such as Out of the Unknown, Doctor Finlay's Casebook, The Avengers, Dixon of Dock Green, The Saint, Marked Personal and The New Avengers, mostly during the 1960s and 1970s. One of his final TV appearances was in Selling Hitler, based on the real-life attempts to sell fake diaries attributed to Adolf Hitler.

During his career Paul also appeared in feature films such as Yangtse Incident (1957), The Curse of the Mummy's Tomb (1964), Cromwell (1970), Eye of the Needle (1981), and Cry Freedom (1987).

== Partial filmography ==
- The Long Arm (1956) - Police Radio Operator (uncredited)
- The Girl in the Picture (1957) - Det. Sgt. Nixon
- Yangtse Incident: The Story of H.M.S. Amethyst (1957) - Staff Officer Operations
- The Steel Bayonet (1957) - Lt. Col. Derry
- The Flesh Is Weak (1957) - Sergeant Franks
- Time Lock (1957) - Foreman (uncredited)
- The Man Who Wouldn't Talk (1958) - John Castle
- Law and Disorder (1958) - Customs Officer
- Violent Moment (1959) - Sgt. Ranson
- Breakout (1959) - Arkwright
- Deadly Record (1959) - Phil Gamage
- Swallows and Amazons (1963) - Captain Flint
- Take Me Over (1963) - Campbell Carter
- The Beauty Jungle (1964) - Advertising Agent (uncredited)
- The Curse of the Mummy's Tomb (1964) - Inspector Mackenzie
- A Countess from Hong Kong (1967) - The Captain
- The Blood Beast Terror (1968) - Mr. Warrender
- The Strange Affair (1968) - Pub Group
- Some Girls Do (1969) - Test Pilot (uncredited)
- The Desperados (1969) - Sheriff Lacey
- Cromwell (1970) - General Digby
- Doomwatch (1972) - Dr. Spencer Quist
- The Bunker (1981) - Gen. Wilhelm Keitel
- Eye of the Needle (1981) - Home Guard Captain
- Cry Freedom (1987) - Wendy's stepfather
