= The Quiet Woman =

1951 British film by John Gilling

- Directed by: John Gilling
- Written by: Ruth Adam; John Gilling
- Produced by: Robert S. Baker; Monty Berman
- Starring: Derek Bond; Jane Hylton; Dora Bryan
- Cinematography: Monty Berman
- Edited by: Jack Slade
- Music by: John Lanchbery
- Production company: Tempean Films
- Distributed by: Eros Films
- Release date: March 1951
- Running time: 71 minutes
- Country: United Kingdom
- Language: English

The Quiet Woman is a 1951 British second feature ('B') crime film directed by John Gilling and starring Derek Bond, Jane Hylton and Dora Bryan. It was written by Ruth Adam and Gilling. A criminal's wife attempts to build a new life after her husband goes to prison, only to be menaced by him when he escapes.

== Plot ==
Duncan McLeod, a gentleman artist and former Naval officer, assisted by his crewman Lefty Brown, engages in smuggling contraband liquor between France and Britain across the English Channel. Duncan and Lefty store the liquor at "The Quiet Woman", a pub in a coastal town on the edge of Romney Marsh in Kent, only to one day find that its complicit owner has moved away without telling them. The pub is now being run by Jane Foster and her friend Elsie. Jane does not approve of ilegal activities and demands that Duncan and Lefty take their contraband liquor elsewhere or she will contact customs officials. Attracted to Jane and Elsie respectively, Duncan and Lefty begin to court them. The women gradually become more receptive to them. Unbeknownst to Duncan, Jane is married to criminal Jim Cranshaw, who is now serving a prison term. Jane is keeping her past a secret while trying to build a new, law-abiding life.

Two new arrivals in town take rooms at the pub: Bromley, a former Navy colleague of Duncan, and Helen, a model and former girlfriend of Duncan who has come in to pose for his latest painting. Helen attempts to rekindle her romance with Duncan, who is not interested, as he is pursuing Jane. Bromley is supposedly on holiday, but is actually a customs inspector tasked with secretly investigating Duncan.

Jim Cranshaw escapes from prison, appears at the pub and demands that Jane hide him and arrange with Duncan to transport him to France. Jim says that unless Jane helps him, he will talk to the authorities, making her look complicit in his avoidance of the police. Under pressure, Jane agrees to hide Jim, but refuses to tell Duncan or involve him in the matter. Meanwhile, a newspaper runs a story on the escape revealing Jane's past involvement with Jim. Helen jealously reveals the story to Duncan and Jane to break up their relationship, and makes it clear that she suspects Jane of being involved in Jim's recent escape. Fed up with Helen's interference, Duncan fires her from the modelling job and tells her to leave town. Duncan then learns via Lefty and Elsie that Jane is hiding Jim in the pub's attic. To protect Jane, Duncan and Lefty secretly move Jim from the attic, and spirit him away aboard Duncan's boat for transport to France. As a result, when the police come to the pub searching for Jim, he is gone, but Helen, who has not left town as directed, says that she saw Jim going into Duncan's house, and that Lefty was there too. Bromley asks if Jane persuaded Duncan to smuggle Jim to France. When she says that she did not, he tells her to telephone Duncan's house to warn him, and goes to the quay himself to try to stop him if he has already left the house. Meanwhile Elsie, furious at Helen's behaviour, follows her upstairs; a few moments later the sounds of slapping and a few shrieks are heard, then Elsie comes downstairs and breezily announces that there is a vacancy.

Bromley finds Lefty on the quay, Duncan having refused to take him on the boat to France in case they get caught. Bromley makes it clear that he knows Jim is on Duncan's yacht, and he and Lefty follow in another boat, soon catching up with them. They see Duncan and Jim on board. Jim draws a gun on Duncan, causing the two men to fight and fall overboard. Bromley and Lefty rescue Duncan, but Jim is struck by Duncan's boat and killed. Bromley, who has noticed Duncan's love for Jane, tells him to be more careful in the future about checking for stowaways. An uncomprehending Duncan starts to protest, but Bromley says that this way is better for Jane. Duncan returns to a waiting Jane, who is now free to love him.

== Cast ==
- Derek Bond as Duncan McLeod
- Jane Hylton as Jane Foster
- Dora Bryan as Elsie Tripp
- Michael Balfour as Lefty Brown
- Dianne Foster as Helen
- Harry Towb as Jim Cranshaw
- John Horsley as Bromley

== Critical reception ==
The Monthly Film Bulletin wrote: "The photography of the Romney Marshes is excellent, but the script is unimaginative and the acting without distinction."

The film historians Steve Chibnall and Brian McFarlane say Jane Hylton "made something very interesting of the pub-keeper with an escaped-convict husband and a dashing smuggler boyfriend (Derek Bond). She suggests, often with evocative stillness, a woman whose past is unravelling and whose future she is tentatively trying to make something of." They also praise Dora Bryan's strong performance in support.
