= Tempean Films =

Film production company

- Opening titles The Trollenberg Terror (1958)
- Industry: Entertainment
- Founded: 1948
- Founder: Robert Baker; Monty Berman
- Defunct: 1961
- Headquarters: London, United Kingdom
- Products: Motion pictures, television programmes

Tempean Films was a British film production company formed in 1948 by Robert Baker and Monty Berman. Tempean's output of B movies were distributed by Eros Films. The company later moved into television, adapting Leslie Charteris' series of The Saint novels, starring Roger Moore.

The company produced several of its features at Southall Studios in Middlesex including both The Trollenberg Terror television series in 1956 and the film version in 1958, which was Southall Studio's final production. The studio was dissolved in 1961.

John Gilling directed many of Tempean's features.

Tempean is an adjective of, or pertaining to, Tempe, a valley in Thessaly, celebrated by Greek poets on account of its beautiful scenery; resembling Tempe; hence, beautiful; delightful; charming.

== Film library ==
- A Date with a Dream (1948) First production of Tempean Films and screen debut of Norman Wisdom
- Melody Club (1949)
- Blackout (1950)
- No Trace (1950)
- The Quiet Woman (1951)
- The Voice of Merrill (1952)
- The Frightened Man (1952)
- 13 East Street (1952)
- The Lost Hours (1952)
- Love in Pawn (1953)
- Recoil (1953)
- Three Steps to the Gallows (1953)
- Escape by Night (1953)
- The Steel Key (1953)
- The Embezzler (1954)
- Impulse (1954)
- The Gilded Cage (1955)
- Reluctant Bride (1955)
- No Smoking (1955)
- Tiger by the Tail (1955)
- Stranger in Town (1957)
- Hour of Decision (1957)
- Kill Me Tomorrow (1957)
- The Blind Spot (1958)
- Blood of the Vampire (1958)
- Jack the Ripper (1958)
- Sea of Sand (1958)
- The Trollenberg Terror (1958) Also known as The Crawling Eye, Creature from Another World, The Creeping Eye, and The Flying Eye, it appeared as the first film in the Mystery Science Theater 3000 series and was mentioned in the final episode
- Stormy Crossing (1958)
- The Siege of Sydney Street (1960)
- The Hellfire Club (1960)
- The Flesh and the Fiends (1960) produced by Triad Productions, a team-up of Tempean Films and John Gilling
- What a Carve Up! (1961)

== Television ==
- The Trollenberg Terror (1956)
- The Saint (1962 - 1969)
- Gideon's Way (1964 - 1965)
