= The Frightened Man =

1952 British film by John Gilling

- Directed by: John Gilling
- Written by: John Gilling
- Produced by: Robert S. Baker; Monty Berman
- Starring: Dermot Walsh; Barbara Murray; Charles Victor
- Cinematography: Monty Berman
- Edited by: Jack Slade
- Music by: John Lanchbery
- Production company: Tempean Films
- Distributed by: Eros Films
- Release date: March 1952
- Running time: 69 minutes
- Country: United Kingdom
- Language: English

The Frightened Man (also known as Rosselli and Son) is a 1952 British second feature crime film directed and written by John Gilling and starring Dermot Walsh, Barbara Murray and Charles Victor. An antiques dealer suffers a dramatic fall from grace.

== Plot ==
Antiques dealer Roselli's dreams for his son Julius are disappointed when the young man is sent down from Oxford University for bad behaviour. Julius then gets involved with a gang of Camden Town jewel thieves. When they attempt to rob a warehouse Julius is injured in the getaway, but he continues his involvement and formulates a plan to steal diamonds from his wife’s employer in Hatton Garden. The gang leader agrees, but intends to cut out Roselli senior who, unknown to Julius, is a partner in the gang.

== Cast ==
- Dermot Walsh as Julius Roselli
- Barbara Murray as Amanda
- Charles Victor as Mr Roselli
- John Blythe as Maxie
- Michael Ward as Cornelius Hart
- Thora Hird as Vera
- John Horsley as Harry Armstrong
- Annette D. Simmonds as Marcella
- Martin Benson as Alec Stone
- Ballard Berkeley as Inspector Bligh
- Peter Bayliss as Bilton
- Thomas Gallagher as Matthews

== Production ==
It was shot at Twickenham and Riverside Studios.

== Critical reception ==
The Monthly Film Bulletin wrote: "A well constructed thriller: efficient performances, particularly from Charles Victor, and adequate suspense."

Picturegoer wrote: "Although well made, this film about a London gang engaged in raiding warehouses does not achieve enough suspense or originality to command full interest. ... The acting, on the whole, is good. Dermot Walsh does what he can with his unsympathetic part; Charles Victor is convincing as the antique dealer; John Blythe, as a Cockney second-hand car dealer, brightens up the film; and Martin Benson is at home as a smooth and successful master crook. But Barbara Murray and Annette Simmonds have colourless parts."

Picture Show wrote: "Simple, sincerely told drama ... A brilliant performance by Charles Victor as the old Italian junk dealer dominates the film."

TV Guide wrote: "this decent crime drama was written and directed by John Gilling, known for his efficient low-budget adventures and thrillers."

In British Sound Films: The Studio Years 1928–1959 David Quinlan rated the film as "average", writing: "Adequate thriller of passing interest, quite well developed."

Britmovie called the film a "decent if unremarkable second-feature crime drama featuring Irish actor Dermot Walsh ... Walsh's father is played by experienced character actor Charles Victor, who performs his role with quiet, self-effacing distinction."

Film historians Steve Chibnall and Brian McFarlane note that "the film won considerable praise for being authentically staged, effectively directed, 'thrilling and human'."
