= The Voice of Merrill =

- UK DVD cover
- Directed by: John Gilling
- Written by: John Gilling; Gerald Landeau; Terence Austin
- Produced by: Robert S. Baker; Monty Berman
- Starring: Valerie Hobson; James Robertson Justice; Edward Underdown; Henry Kendall
- Cinematography: Monty Berman
- Edited by: Gordon Pilkington
- Music by: Frank Cordell
- Production company: Tempean Films
- Distributed by: Eros Films
- Release dates: December 1952 (UK); April 1953 (US)
- Running time: 83 minutes
- Country: United Kingdom
- Language: English

The Voice of Merrill is a 1952 British mystery film directed by John Gilling and starring Valerie Hobson, James Robertson Justice and Edward Underdown. It was written by Gilling, Gerald Landeau and Terence Austin, and was released in the USA in 1953 as Murder Will Out.

== Plot ==
A convicted female blackmailer is found murdered in her flat and suspicion falls on three men, all of whom the police believe might have had a motive: struggling author Hugh Allen was involved in a relationship with the dead woman; Allen's publisher Ronald Parker, who had been blackmailed out of several thousand pounds while she was in his employ, and playwright Jonathan Roach who knew the woman but is evasive about the exact nature of their acquaintance. None of the three can provide a verifiable alibi for the time of the murder, so Inspector Thornton decides to shadow them in the belief that sooner or later the guilty party will betray himself.

Meanwhile, Allen has fallen in love with Roach's wife Alycia, who is tired of her loveless marriage, and the pair begin an affair. Roach is suffering from a heart condition and his life expectancy may be as little as a few months. He has written an episodic radio play, "The Voice of Merrill", which he wants to present anonymously and he agrees to Alycia's suggestion that Allen should be the narrator on the broadcasts. Alycia persuades Allen to go along with a plot to pass off the play as Allen's own work in an attempt to boost his career. Alycia then poisons Roach with his medications, trusting that his death will be attributed to his medical condition. But Thornton knows about her affair with Allen, and when Roach dies, Thornton has suspicions, and Alycia is horrified when he informs her that an autopsy will be carried out. Allen tells Alycia that he will confess to the murder rather than see her charged, but she attempts to dissuade him. When the autopsy results come back, they show that Roach died of natural causes, so the couple believe that they are off the hook.

However, prior to his death, Roach had seen newspaper reports that Allen was the anonymous "Merrill", and was angry that Allen was not denying them. So he has set up an elaborate posthumous revenge, and, as the last episode of "The Voice of Merrill" is broadcast, Thornton realises that the storyline is pointing him towards the blackmailer's killer.

== Cast ==
- Valerie Hobson as Alycia Roach
- James Robertson Justice as Jonathan Roach
- Edward Underdown as Hugh Allen
- Henry Kendall as Ronald Parker
- Garry Marsh as Inspector Thornton
- Sam Kydd as Sgt. Baker
- Ian Fleming as Dr. Forrest
- Daniel Wherry as Pierce
- Daphne Newton as Miss Quinn
- Alvar Lidell as radio announcer

== Production ==
The film was made at Twickenham Studios with some location shooting around London, with sets designed by art director Wilfred Arnold. It was produced by Tempean Films, the company owned by the film's producers Monty Berman and Robert S. Baker, which between the late 1940s and the late 1950s specialised in turning out low-budget B-movies as unpublicised second-features for the UK cinema market.

== Release ==
On its release, The Voice of Merrill was recognised by its distributors, Eros Films, as unusually sophisticated and stylish for a B-movie, and was elevated to the status of co-feature in cinemas.

== Critical reception ==
The Monthly Film Bulletin wrote: "This long drawn-out murder fails to keep up the suspense despite its many twists. Edward Underdown underacts almost heroically; Valerie Hobson goes through most of the film with a fixed, impish smile and James Robertson Justice suggests as [sic] a very pale copy of Monty Woolley. Producers of this type of film really ought to avoid dialogue like, 'Unbelievable, isn't it?' – 'That's putting it mildly!'."

Kine Weekly wrote: "James Robertson Justice tends to overact as the cynical Jonathan and Edward Underdown is a bit too doleful as Hugh – but Valerie Hobson never loses her composure as the attractive yet calculating Alycia, and she soon rallies the team and tightens up the plot. The concluding chapters are first class theatre and tension mounts right to the surprise and salutary finale."

Variety wrote: "Very little happens and a great deal of time is consumed in lengthy exchanges of dialog in this placid, somewhat involved British thriller about murder, intrigue, revenge and justice poetically wrought. ... Miss Hobson is beautiful but not very convincing."

Picturegoer wrote: "Slightly pretentious, but nevertheless effective, thriller in which a colourful triangle theme is firmly welded to an out-of-the-rut whodunit. ... Valerie Hobson contributes a first-class performance as the smart and calculating wife, and not only enables the piece to survive a phoney start, but also gives it essential finesse and character."

Picture Show wrote: "Thrilling and ingenious murder melodrama ... Tension grows steadily until! the surprise ending. It is well acted, especially by Valerie Hobson, and skilfully directed."

Leslie Halliwell wrote: "Complicated murder thriller which intrigues but hardly satisfies."

The Radio Times Guide to Films gave the film 2/5 stars, writing: "This complex and rather dull suspenser has Valerie Hobson and James Robertson-Justice as a husband and wife under suspicion for murdering a blackmailer. A talent much stronger than John Gilling's (who both wrote and directed this tosh) was needed to bring off this tale of murder among the plummy voices, but these days there's pleasure to be gained just from watching the elegant cast go through their preposterous paces."

Film historians Steve Chibnall and Brian McFarlane praised the performances of Valerie Hobson and James Robertson Justice, adding: "The plot, which moves with exemplary speed and fluency towards its downbeat ending, and Berman's camerawork collude with a strong cast to produce an ingenious specimen of murder-mystery drama."
