= Windfall (1955 film) =

Comedy by Henry Cass

- Original Australian daybill
- Directed by: Henry Cass
- Screenplay by: John Gilling
- Produced by: Robert S. Baker; Monty Berman
- Starring: Lionel Jeffries; Jack Watling; Gordon Jackson
- Cinematography: Monty Berman
- Edited by: Maurice Rootes
- Production company: Mid Century Film Productions
- Distributed by: Eros Films (UK)
- Release date: February 1955 (UK)
- Running time: 77 minutes
- Country: United Kingdom
- Language: English

Windfall, also released as Dangerous Money, is a 1955 British second feature ('B') comedy film directed by Henry Cass and starring Lionel Jeffries, Jack Watling and Gordon Jackson. It was written by John Gilling. It is a remake of the 1935 film of the same title.

== Plot ==
The lives of shop assistant Arthur Lee and his family are transformed when he finds £2,000 on top of a bus. Arthur's daughter's dodgy boy friend steals the money, but lands in trouble when it's discovered to be counterfeit. Things turn out well for Arthur when the resulting publicity gives a boost to his business.

== Cast ==
- Lionel Jeffries as Arthur Lee
- Jack Watling as John Lee
- Gordon Jackson as Leonard
- Avice Landone as Mary Lee
- Brian Worth as Michael Collins
- Patricia Owens as Connie Lee
- Cyril Chamberlain as Clarkson

== Reception ==
The Monthly Film Bulletin wrote: "An unpretentious and naive film; the humour of the early passages is more acceptable than the seriousness or sentimentality of the later ones. The acting is generally adequate, with hard work by Lionel Jeffries in the most substantial part."

Kine Weekly wrote: "Neatly fashioned domestic-cum-financial comedy drama. ... Its humour, slightly satirical, and sentiment are down-to-earth, and Lionel Jeffries, immense in the lead, smoothly blends them into a warm and diverting whole. A little gem of its type, it'll tickle all classes."

In British Sound Films: The Studio Years 1928–1959 David Quinlan rated the film as "average", writing: "Pleasant, unpretentious parable."
