= The Gilded Cage (1955 film) =

- Directed by: John Gilling
- Screenplay by: Brock Williams; Paul Erickson (story)
- Produced by: Robert S. Baker; Monty Berman
- Starring: Alex Nicol; Veronica Hurst; Clifford Evans
- Cinematography: Monty Berman
- Edited by: Jim Connock
- Music by: Stanley Black
- Production company: Tempean Films
- Distributed by: Eros Films (UK)
- Release date: February 1955 (UK)
- Running time: 77 minutes
- Country: United Kingdom
- Language: English

The Gilded Cage is a 1955 second feature British crime film directed by John Gilling and starring Alex Nicol, Veronica Hurst and Clifford Evans. It was written by Brock Williams from a story by Paul Erickson.

== Plot ==
Two brothers become involved with criminals planning a major art heist involving the paintingThe Gilded Cage, only to be framed by them for the theft.

== Cast ==
- Alex Nicol as Steve Anderson
- Michael Alexander as Harry Anderson
- Veronica Hurst as Marcia Farrell
- Clifford Evans as Ken Aimes
- Ursula Howells as Brenda Lucas
- Trevor Reid as Inspector Brace
- Elwyn Brook-Jones as Bruno
- John Stuart as Harding
- Kenneth Cope as hotel receptionist
- Ronan O'Casey as Trickson

== Critical reception ==
Monthly Film Bulletin said "A modest mystery thriller, competently made except for a few wild improbabilities in the plot and a five-figure London telephone number. There are good performances by Elwyn Brooke-Jones and Clifford Evans."

Kine Weekly wrote: "Colourful, if somewhat dishevelled, crime melodrama. ... The characterisation and staging are adequate and, what with one and the other, it succeeds in extracting quite a few thrills from the tangled skein of the tale."

Picturegoer wrote: "Vigorously handled by Alex Nicol, Veronica Hurst and Clifford Evans, seen as hero, heroine and villain respectively, it carries quite a kick."

Picture Show wrote: "'Thrilling and fast-moving there is plenty of exciting action."

The Radio Times Guide to Films gave the film 2/5 stars, writing: "After a string of supporting roles for Universal in the early 1950s, Alex Nicol earned a dubious promotion to leading man in this British thriller, co-starring Clifford Evans. Director John Gilling tries to push this tale of art theft and murder along at a decent pace, but spotting who framed Nichol's brother is hardly taxing."

In British Sound Films: The Studio Years 1928–1959 David Quinlan rated the film as "average", writing: "Standard thriller, vigorously played."

Sky Movies noted a "standard British thick-ear thriller of the Fifties ... Vigorous playing from a solid cast that includes Clifford Evans and Veronica Hurst sees the ingenuous story through."

== Releases ==
The film was released on DVD by Renown Pictures in 2013.
