= Bond of Fear =

1956 British film by Henry Cass

- British theatrical poster
- Directed by: Henry Cass
- Screenplay by: John Gilling; Norman Hudis
- Produced by: Monty Berman; Robert S. Baker
- Starring: Dermot Walsh; Jane Barrett; John Colicos
- Cinematography: Monty Berman
- Edited by: Stanley Marks
- Music by: Stanley Black
- Distributed by: Eros Films (UK)
- Release date: April 1956 (UK)
- Running time: 66 min
- Country: United Kingdom
- Language: English

Bond of Fear is a 1956 British 'B' crime drama film directed by Henry Cass and starring Dermot Walsh, Jane Barrett, and John Colicos. The screenplay was by John Gilling and Norman Hudis.

== Premise ==
John Sewell and his family are taken hostage by desperate fugitive Dewar who is a stowaway in their caravan.

== Cast ==
- Dermot Walsh as John Sewell
- Jane Barrett as Mary Sewell
- John Colicos as Dewar
- Marilyn Baker as Ann Sewell
- Anthony Pavey as Michael Sewell
- Alan MacNaughtan as Detective Sergeant Daley
- Jameson Clark as Scotty
- John Horsley as motorcycle policeman
- Marianne Stone as Mrs. Simon
- Arnold Bell as Police Sergeant at road block
- Avril Angers as girl hiker
- Bill Shine as man hiker
- Peter Swanwick as travelling salesman
- Hal Osmond as hospital orderly
- Trevor Reid as Dover Police Inspector
- Alan Robinson as Dover immigration official

== Critical reception ==
The Monthly Film Bulletin wrote: "A modest, competently made thriller which extracts a fair amount of suspense from its central situation and adds some conventional touches of policeman comedy. The playing is sound, with John Colicos making an effective villain."

Kine Weekly wrote: "The film takes a picturesque route and the pleasant backgrounds artfully embroider its thrills, Dermot Walsh does a sound job as the menaced John, Jane Barrett acts with composure as Mary, John Colicos makes a hearty villain as Dewar, and Anthony Pavey and Marilyn Baker are natural as Michael and Ann, The police detail is illuminating and gives a realistic touch to salient situations and the tense climax. Suspenseful, yet completely innocuous, it should have been given the benefit of the U certificate."

In British Sound Films: The Studio Years 1928–1959 David Quinlan rated the film as "mediocre", writing: "Repetitive drama just about passes the time."

Chibnall and McFarlane in The British 'B' Film called the film a "moderately inventive thriller."
