= No Trace (1950 film) =

- Directed by: John Gilling
- Written by: John Gilling; Robert S. Baker; Carl Nystrom
- Produced by: Robert S. Baker; Monty Berman
- Starring: Hugh Sinclair; Dinah Sheridan; John Laurie
- Cinematography: Monty Berman
- Edited by: Gerald Landau
- Music by: John Lanchbery
- Production company: Tempean Films
- Distributed by: Eros Films (UK)
- Release date: 8 September 1950 (UK)
- Running time: 76 minutes
- Country: United Kingdom
- Language: English

No Trace is a 1950 British second feature crime film directed by John Gilling and starring Hugh Sinclair, Dinah Sheridan and John Laurie. It was written by Gilling, Robert S. Baker and Carl Nystrom. A crime writer murders a blackmailer, and is then asked to help solve the case by the police.

== Plot ==
Crime novelist Robert Southley murders the man who has been blackmailing him. Returning after his manufactured alibi, he is alarmed to see his friend, Inspector MacDougall with his secretary Linda, but Mac is actually there to invite Southley to accompany him on the investigation, to see what police work really entails. The other detective on the case is John, Linda's boyfriend, who doesn't like Southley, but is it because Linda is so blindly loyal to him or because he senses something of Robert's true character? When Southley begins a novel based on the murder, coupled with other 'coincidences', Linda starts to wonder if he might be involved with the killing. Southley's first attempt on her life fails, and he then takes Linda to his country cottage to demonstrate his alibi for the murder, but it is here that Linda accidentally finds a clue that explodes it. As Southley plans a second alibi and a second death, he doesn't realise that Mac and John, whose investigating skills he is arrogantly contemptuous of, have actually uncovered much more than he thinks - but will they get the proof in time to save Linda?

== Cast ==
- Hugh Sinclair as Robert Southley
- Dinah Sheridan as Linda
- John Laurie as Inspector MacDougall
- Barry Morse as Sergeant Harrison
- Dora Bryan as Maisie Phelps
- Michael Brennan as Mike Fenton
- Anthony Pendrell as Stevens
- Michael Ward as Clooney
- Ernest Butcher as Fern
- Madoline Thomas as Mrs Green
- Beatrice Varley as Mrs Finch
- Sidney Vivian as barman
- Hal Osmond as taxi driver
- Sam Kydd as mechanic

== Production ==
The working title of the film was Murder by the Book. It was made at Twickenham Studios and on location in London and Buckinghamshire.

== Critical reception ==
Monthly Film Bulletin said "Competent acting does not compensate for weaknesses in plot construction."

TV Guide wrote "Though a tightly controlled, well-paced thriller, there are few surprises; the characterizations are well played, and the direction shows a good feel for excitement".

DVD Talk noted "Not a bad film as much as it is merely diverting."

In British Sound Films: The Studio Years 1928–1959 David Quinlan rated the film as "average", writing: "Unlikely, but competently-done thriller."

Chibnall and McFarlane in The British 'B' Film describe the film as a "proficient entertainment."

The Radio Times Guide to Films gave the film 3/5 stars, writing: "This is a better than-average 'quota quickie' from John Gilling, in which crime writer Hugh Sinclair tries to cover his tracks (and delude snooping cop John Laurie) after he kills a blackmailer from his gangland past. As we know from the outset that he won't get away with it, the fun lies in watching him make the slips that give him away to secretary Dinah Sheridan and her admirer Barry Morse."
