= The Lost Hours =

1952 British film by David MacDonald

- Theatrical release poster
- Directed by: David MacDonald
- Written by: Steve Fisher; John Gilling
- Story by: Robert S. Baker; Carl Nystrom
- Produced by: Robert S. Baker; Monty Berman
- Starring: Mark Stevens; Jean Kent; John Bentley
- Cinematography: Monty Berman
- Edited by: Reginald Beck
- Music by: William Hill-Bowen
- Production company: Tempean Films
- Distributed by: Eros Films (UK); RKO Radio Pictures (US)
- Release date: September 1952
- Running time: 67 minutes
- Country: United Kingdom
- Language: English

The Lost Hours (also known as The Big Frame) is a 1952 British second feature ('B') film noir directed by David MacDonald and starring Mark Stevens, Jean Kent and John Bentley. It was written by Steve Fisher and John Gilling. It was produced by Tempean Films which specialised in making second features at the time, and marked Kent's first "descent", as Chibnall and McFarlane put it, into B films after her 1940s stardom. It was released in the United States in 1953 by RKO Pictures.

== Plot summary ==
An American returns for a reunion in the United Kingdom, where he served as a pilot during the Second World War, but finds himself framed for a murder he didn't commit.

== Cast ==
- Mark Stevens as Paul Smith
- Jean Kent as Louise Parker
- John Bentley as Clark Sutton
- Garry Marsh as Inspector Foster
- Cyril Smith as Detective Sergeant Roper
- Dianne Foster as Dianne Wrigley
- Bryan Coleman as Tom Wrigley
- Leslie Perrins as Dr Derek Morrison
- Duncan Lamont as Bristow
- John Horsley as Brown
- Jack Lambert as John Parker
- John Harvey as Kenneth Peters
- Sam Kydd as Fred, mechanic at Bristow & Brown
- Thora Hird as hotel maid
- John Gabriel as barman
- Alastair Hunter as commissionaire
- Hal Osmond as garage attendant
- Ballard Berkeley as police doctor
- Peter Hawkins as mechanic (uncredited)

== Production ==
It was shot at Isleworth Studios and on location around London, with sets designed by the art director Andrew Mazzei.

== Reception ==
The Monthly Film Bulletin wrote: "An undistinguished British thriller made with more than one eye on the American B picture market, The Lost Hours has its full share of improbabilities of character and action. The actors can make little of their roles, which is certainly a waste of Mark Stevens, who seems rather tired and bored throughout. A thriller on the most superficial level can still be exciting, but The Lost Hours is not even this."

Kine Weekly wrote: The plot is ingenious and the accomplished cast, headed by a transatlantic star, and resourceful director, backed up by convincing atmosphere, see that there is no lack of suspense. It holds with a steady grip from themoment it opens until it arrives at its traditional nick-of-time finale."

Variety wrote: "The Big Frame ... is a hackneyed murder melodrama. ... It wends an obscure course among stock whodunit situations."

The Radio Times Guide to Films gave the film 2/5 stars, writing: "This is one of director David MacDonald's least distinguished ventures, being another of the dreaded quota quickies in which a third-rate Hollywood star gets to play the lead in a threadbare crime story, notable for the cheapness of the sets, the dismal dialogue and the eagerness of the supporting cast."

In British Sound Films: The Studio Years 1928–1959 David Quinlan rated the film as "mediocre", writing: "Quite fast-moving; script and acting undistinghuished."
