= Blackout (1950 film) =

1950 British film by Robert S. Baker

- Directed by: Robert S. Baker
- Screenplay by: John Gilling
- Story by: Carl Nystrom
- Produced by: Robert S. Baker; Monty Berman
- Starring: Maxwell Reed; Dinah Sheridan; Patric Doonan; Kynaston Reeves; Annette D. Simmonds; Eric Pohlmann; Michael Evans; Michael Brennan; Ronald Leigh-Hunt
- Cinematography: Monty Berman
- Edited by: Gerald Landau
- Music by: John Lanchbery
- Production company: Tempean Films
- Distributed by: Eros Films (1950) (UK) (theatrical)
- Release date: September 1950 (United Kingdom)
- Running time: 78 min
- Country: Great Britain
- Language: English

Blackout is a 1950 British second feature ('B') crime drama film directed by Robert S. Baker and starring Maxwell Reed and Dinah Sheridan. The screenplay was by John Gilling from a story by Carl Nystrom.

== Plot ==
An engineer, Christopher Pelley, loses his eyesight in an accident and is due to have an operation to restore his sight. One night he goes to a friend's house but the driver drops him at the wrong address by mistake. Pelley goes inside and discovers a body, as well as a ring, on the floor. The three killers, who are still in the house, decide to simply knock him out once they realise he is blind and cannot identify them.

When Pelley comes round the police investigate his story but cannot locate the house or body, so after he regains his eyesight after the operation he decides to try to solve the mystery. He returns to the house to find Patricia Dale living there with her father and from a photo on the piano he realises that the ring belongs to her brother, Norman, who is presumed dead after a plane crash a year before. Patricia agrees to investigate the mystery with Pelley, and they speak to Norman's friend Chalky, who was with him the night he was presumed to have died. Chalky gives them a couple of leads, and when Pelley follows up one at a travel agency he meets Guy Sinclair who works there and whose voice Pelley recognises as one of the three men who knocked him out.

It becomes clear that the three men – Sinclair, a thug called Mickey and their leader, Otto – are involved in a smuggling ring, and Pelley manages to get hold of a book which, although in code, incriminates all three men in the smuggling racket. Pelley tracks the crooks down to an isolated house, The Grange, and is caught by Mickey and held prisoner in the house. He manages to escape with the help of Lila, a girlfriend of Norman's. He enlists Chalky's help, and they go to see Lila, who has information for them; however she is killed by Mickey before they can speak to her.

Patricia disappears after receiving a message asking her to meet someone at midday, whilst Pelley realises that Chalky has been working with the gang all the time. Chalky is mistakenly killed by the gang instead of Pelley. Pelley then goes to find Patricia after telling her father to contact the police, and he finds her being held hostage at The Grange. It transpires that her brother Norman is alive and is actually the gang's ringleader, who faked his own death to evade arrest; the body Pelley stumbled over in the house was that of a customs investigator. Pelley manages to foil the gang and Norman falls to his death trying to escape from Pelley and the police, and Pelley and Patricia leave hand in hand.

== Cast ==
- Maxwell Reed as Chris Pelley
- Dinah Sheridan as Patricia Dale
- Patric Doonan as Chalky
- Kynaston Reeves as Mr. Dale
- Annette D. Simmonds as Lila Drew
- Eric Pohlmann as Otto Ford
- Michael Evans as Guy Sinclair
- Michael Brennan as Mickey Garston
- Ernest Butcher as Benny
- Campbell Singer as Inspector
- Madoline Thomas as housekeeper
- Basil Appleby as Norman Dale
- Ronald Leigh-Hunt as Dr. Langley
- Pat Metcalfe as maid
- Ida Patlanski as postmistress
- Jean Lodge as nurse

== Production ==
Filming took place in Buckinghamshire, Hertfordshire, London and Surrey.

Blackout was later remade by the same producers as the crime drama Blind Spot (1958), but with a different director.

== Critical reception ==
The Monthly Film Bulletin wrote: "Slight little thriller, with pattern of events all too easily predictable."

Kine Weekly said "Unpretentious British crime melodrama, set in and around London. The script is not entirely flawless and neither is the cast, but the co-stars meet all demands and the joint directors are not lacking in resource. Thrills steadily pile up and the denouement is showmanlike."

Picturegoer wrote: "'The unusual opening gives the film a flying start, and Maxwell Reed and Dinah Sheridan handle its crime hokum well. Authentic London exteriors contribute to good atmosphere. All things considered, an acceptable thriller."

Leslie Halliwell reviewed Blackout as "Fairly entertaining British support of its time."

In The British 'B' Film, Steve Chibnall and Brian McFarlane call the film "proficient entertainment."

In British Sound Films: The Studio Years 1928–1959 David Quinlan rated the film as "average", writing: "Slightly different approach to an old story: acceptable thriller."
