= Tiger by the Tail (1955 film) =

1955 British crime film by John Gilling

- Theatrical release poster
- Directed by: John Gilling
- Screenplay by: John Gilling; Willis Goldbeck
- Based on: Never Come Back by John Mair
- Produced by: Robert S. Baker; Monty Berman
- Starring: Larry Parks; Constance Smith; Lisa Daniely; Cyril Chamberlain; Donald Stewart
- Cinematography: Eric Cross
- Edited by: Jack Slade
- Music by: Stanley Black
- Production company: Tempean Films
- Distributed by: Eros Films (UK); United Artists (US)
- Release date: 30 May 1955
- Running time: 80 minutes
- Country: United Kingdom
- Language: English

Tiger by the Tail (U.S. title: Cross-Up; also known as CrossUp) is a 1955 British second feature ('B') crime thriller film directed by John Gilling and starring Larry Parks, Constance Smith, Lisa Daniely and Donald Stewart. The screenplay was by Gilling and Willis Goldbeck, adapted from the 1942 novel Never Come Back by John Mair.

== Plot ==
An American journalist works to expose a criminal gang in London. However, his investigation of their counterfeiting activities leads to his kidnapping by the gang.

== Cast ==
- Larry Parks as John Desmond
- Constance Smith as Jane Claymore
- Lisa Daniely as Anna Ray
- Cyril Chamberlain as Foster
- Donald Stewart as Macauly
- Ronan O'Casey as Nick
- Alexander Gauge as Fitzgerald
- Ronald Leigh-Hunt as Doctor Scott
- June Rodney as young psychiatric nurse
- Joan Heal as Annabella
- Thora Hird as Mary
- Doris Hare as Nurse Brady
- Marie Bryant as Melodie
- Russell Westwood as Sam
- John H. Watson as Truscott
- Robert Moore as Clarke
- Hal Osmond as Charlie
- Frank Forsyth as Sergeant Gross
- Alastair Hunter as hotel clerk
- Margot Bryant as cleaning woman

== Production ==
The film was shot at Walton Studios and on location around London.

Larry Parks had fallen foul of America's House Un-American Activities Committee, and had his first film role for four years starring in this film.

Mair's novel was subsequently adapted under its original name by David Pirie as a three-part TV serial by the BBC in 1990.

== Critical reception ==
The Monthly Film Bulletin wrote: "An average British crime thriller, involving an American hero in the familiar rigmarole of gangs, kidnappings and escapes. Unimaginatively, though quite capably directed, the film seems rather a waste of the talents of its leading players."

The Radio Times Guide to Films gave the film 1/5 stars, writing: "Another trudge through the lowest depths of British movie-making, in the company of quota quickie specialist John Gilling. Larry Parks stars in this, one of his British movies, made after he was driven out of Hollywood at the height of his career during the McCarthy era witch-hunts of the 1950s. He plods through a tatty little tale about a journalist threatened by hoodlums. A thrill-free thriller."

In British Sound Films: The Studio Years 1928–1959 David Quinlan rated the film as "average", writing: "Standard British thriller with familiar situations leaves its competent cast with little chance to shine."

Sky Movies called it a "thoroughly routine British `B' thriller. ... Familiar situations and backdrops give a competent cast ... little chance to elevate their material above the ordinary. Director John Gilling, who also co-scripted, ensures the thriller is competent in all departments, if no more."
