= Wilfred Arnold =

British art director (1903–1970)

- Born: Charles Wilfred Arnold; 12 February 1903; Ormskirk, Lancashire, England, UK
- Died: 9 June 1970 (aged 67); Harrow, Middlesex, England, UK
- Other name: C. Wilfred Arnold
- Occupation: Art director
- Years active: 1925–1970 (film)

Wilfred Arnold (12 February 1903 – 9 June 1970), also known as C. Wilfred Arnold, was a British art director. He was a prolific contributor to British films, designing the sets for more than a hundred. His brother Norman Arnold was also an art director.

== Selected filmography ==
- The Rat (1925)
- The Sea Urchin (1926)
- The Lodger (1927)
- The Silver Lining (1927)
- The Ring (1927)
- The Farmer's Wife (1928)
- Champagne (1928)
- The First Born (1928)
- The Manxman (1929)
- Blackmail (1929)
- Under the Greenwood Tree (1929)
- Rich and Strange (1931)
- The Outsider (1931)
- Number Seventeen (1932)
- Lord of the Manor (1933)
- Sorrell and Son (1933)
- One Precious Year (1933)
- Dick Turpin (1934)
- Girls Please! (1934)
- I Spy (1934)
- Brewster's Millions (1935)
- Escape Me Never (1935)
- The Mad Hatters (1935)
- The Hope of His Side (1935)
- Talk of the Devil (1936)
- When Knights Were Bold (1936)
- Museum Mystery (1937)
- Midnight Menace (1937)
- Night Ride (1937)
- Missing, Believed Married (1937)
- Incident in Shanghai (1938)
- This Man Is News (1938)
- A Spot of Bother (1938)
- The Silent Battle (1939)
- The Saint in London (1939)
- Music Hall Parade (1939)
- An Englishman's Home (1940)
- Salute John Citizen (1942)
- We'll Meet Again (1943)
- Old Mother Riley Detective (1943)
- Theatre Royal (1943)
- The Dummy Talks (1943)
- Medal for the General (1944)
- Candles at Nine (1944)
- Meet Sexton Blake (1945)
- Twilight Hour (1945)
- The Agitator (1945)
- The Echo Murders (1945)
- Old Mother Riley at Home (1945)
- Loyal Heart (1946)
- Meet the Navy (1946)
- Appointment with Crime (1946)
- Spring Song (1946)
- Green Fingers (1947)
- The Ghosts of Berkeley Square (1947)
- The Three Weird Sisters (1948)
- Counterblast (1948)
- No Room at the Inn (1948)
- Marry Me (1949)
- The Woman with No Name (1950)
- Up for the Cup (1950)
- Old Mother Riley, Headmistress (1950)
- Worm's Eye View (1951)
- Take Me to Paris (1951)
- Reluctant Heroes (1952)
- Stolen Face (1952)
- Lady in the Fog (1952)
- The Voice of Merrill (1952)
- Little Big Shot (1952)
- Three Steps to the Gallows (1953)
- Wheel of Fate (1953)
- The Flanagan Boy (1953)
- The Steel Key (1953)
- Recoil (1953)
- Escape by Night (1953)
- Love in Pawn (1953)
- Impulse (1954)
- The Runaway Bus (1954)
- Double Exposure (1954)
- Life with the Lyons (1954)
- The Embezzler (1954)
- Delayed Action (1954)
- The Golden Link (1954)

== Bibliography ==
- Ryall, Tom. Alfred Hitchcock and the British Cinema. Athlone Press, 1996.
