= Stranger in Town (1957 film) =

British film by George Pollock

- U.S. lobby card
- Directed by: George Pollock
- Written by: Edward Dryhurst; Norman Hudis
- Based on: The Uninvited; 1954 novel by Frank Chittenden
- Produced by: Robert S. Baker; Monty Berman; Sidney Roberts
- Starring: Alex Nicol; Anne Paige; Mary Laura Wood
- Cinematography: Geoffrey Faithfull
- Edited by: Henry Richardson
- Music by: Stanley Black
- Production company: Tempean Films
- Distributed by: Eros Films (UK); Astor Pictures Corporation (U.S.)
- Release date: May 1957 (UK)
- Running time: 74 minutes
- Country: United Kingdom
- Language: English

Stranger in Town is a 1957 British second feature ('B') crime film directed by George Pollock and starring Alex Nicol and Anne Paige. The screenplay was by Edward Dryhurst and Norman Hudis, based on the 1954 novel The Uninivited by Frank Chittenden.

== Plot ==
An American composer, lodging in a quiet English village is found shot dead. A journalist, also from America probes the death on behalf of the pianist's only relative in America. His trail leads to the local gossip who is later found gassed and debunks the official theory that it was suicide, finding that many people seem to have had reason to commit the crime, as he eventually discovers the truth.

== Cast ==
- Alex Nicol as John Madison
- Anne Paige as Vicky Leigh
- Mary Laura Wood as Lorna Ryland
- Mona Washbourne as Agnes Smith
- Charles Lloyd-Pack as Captain Nash
- Bruce Beeby as William Ryland
- John Horsley as Inspector Powell
- Colin Tapley as Henry Ryland
- Betty Impey as Geraldine Nash
- Peggy Ann Clifford as Mrs Woodham
- Arthur Lowe as jeweller
- Willoughby Goddard as publican

== Production ==
The film was made by Tempean Films at Alliance Film Studios.

== Reception ==
The Monthly Film Bulletin wrote: "As a novel, this story may have made an efficient thriller, but it has been so clumsily adapted that the plot has become utterly incoherent; and neither direction nor editing help to clarify it. Only Alex Nicol, among the large cast, plays with integrity and conviction."

Kine Weekly wrote: "The picture is a modest affair, but even so it contains quite a few thrills, shrewdly punctuated by apt comedy touches. Alex Nicol makes a manly Madison and Anne Paige, Colin Tapley, Bruce Beeby, Mona Washbourne and Charles Lloyd Pack have their moments in direct support. Its rural scenes are most refreshing and the person responsible for the pianoforte accompaniment works overtime to good effect."

In British Sound Films: The Studio Years 1928–1959 David Quinlan rated the film as "average", writing: "'Clumsy and incoherent' or 'sharp and sound', according to which magazine you chose – this split the critics."
