= Double Exposure (1954 film) =

British crime film by John Gilling

- Directed by: John Gilling
- Written by: John Gilling; John Roddick
- Produced by: Robert S. Baker; Monty Berman
- Starring: John Bentley; Rona Anderson; Garry Marsh
- Cinematography: Monty Berman
- Edited by: Margery Saunders
- Music by: John Lanchbery
- Production company: Kenilworth Film Productions
- Distributed by: General Film Distributors
- Release date: 29 March 1954
- Running time: 61 minutes
- Country: United Kingdom
- Language: English

Double Exposure is a 1954 British second feature ('B') crime film directed by John Gilling and starring John Bentley, Rona Anderson and Garry Marsh. It was written by Gilling and John Roddick.

== Cast ==
- John Bentley as Pete Fleming
- Rona Anderson as Barbara Leyland
- Garry Marsh as Beaumont
- Alexander Gauge as Denis Clayton
- Ingeborg von Kusserow as Maxine Golder
- John Horsley as Lamport
- Doris Hare as Woman Police Sergeant
- Eric Berry
- Frank Forsyth as Inspector Grayle
- Ronan O'Casey as Trickson
- Alan Robinson
- Ryck Rydon as Trixon
- Sally Newton
- Rita Webb as flower seller

== Production ==
The film was made at Southall Studios, with sets designed by Wilfred Arnold.

== Critical reception ==
The Monthly Film Bulletin wrote: "Formula thriller, which opens promisingly but becomes less exciting as it progresses; attempts at comedy, in the dialogue between Fleming and his partner, Beaumont, are rather heavy-handed."

Kine Weekly wrote: "A keen sense of humour artfully relieves tension and cloaks occasional inconsistencies. In a word the thumbnail thriller makes a favourable impresson."

In British Sound Films: The Studio Years 1928–1959 David Quinlan rated the film as "mediocre", writing: "Good premise but thriller becomes less convincing as it progresses."
