= High Terrace =

1956 film by Henry Cass

The High Terrace
- Directed by: Henry Cass
- Written by: Norman Hudis; Alfred Shaughnessy; Brock Williams
- Based on: an original story by A. T. Weisman
- Produced by: Robert S. Baker; Monty Berman
- Starring: Dale Robertson; Lois Maxwell; Derek Bond\Eric Pohlmann; Lionel Jeffries
- Cinematography: Eric Cross
- Edited by: Henry Richardson
- Music by: Stanley Black
- Production company: Cipa
- Release date: 1 October 1956 (UK general release)
- Running time: 69 minutes
- Country: United Kingdom
- Language: English

The High Terrace, also known as High Terrace, is a 1956 black and white British second feature ('B') mystery film directed by Henry Cass and starring Dale Robertson, Lois Maxwell, Derek Bond, Eric Pohlmann and Lionel Jeffries. It was written by Norman Hudis, Alfred Shaughnessy and Brock Williams from an original story by A. T. Weisman.

== Plot ==
Beautiful fledgling actress Stephanie Blake is starring in playwright Otto Kellner's latest theatrical hit. Unbeknownst to her, the writer is in love with her, and is jealous of any competition. Stephanie is ambitious for a part in a new play by American Bill Lang, but Kellner refuses to release her from her contract. When Kellner is found stabbed with a pair of Stephanie's scissors, Bill Lang fears she is being framed and so aids her in moving the body. But when the police discover the corpse, everyone becomes a suspect.

== Cast ==
- Dale Robertson as Bill Lang
- Lois Maxwell as Stephanie Blake
- Derek Bond as John Mansfield
- Eric Pohlmann as Otto Kellner
- Mary Laura Wood as Molly Kellner
- Lionel Jeffries as Monkton
- Jameson Clark as Detective Inspector MacKay
- Carl Bernard as Jock Dunmow
- Garard Green as Raymond White
- Olwen Brookes as Mother Superior
- Benita Lydal as Violet Gage
- Jack Cunningham as priest
- Jonathan Field as theater critic
- Gretchen Franklin as Mrs. Webb
- Alan Robinson as Robert Baines
- Marianne Stone as Mansfield's landlady
- Frederick Treves as Constable West

== Critical reception ==
The Monthly Film Bulletin wrote: "A carefully made, rather slowly developed murder mystery with some above average playing in the supporting parts. Lois Maxwell is convincing in the slightly unsympathetic role of the ambitious Stephanie."

Kine Weekly wrote: "Lois Maxwell displays considerable finesse as Stephanie, Dale Robertson, the western favourite, gets along comfortably without his horse as Bill, and Eric Pohlmann, although dismissed in the second reel, makes quite an impression as Kellner. Dialogue smooth, staging effective, and twist climax aptly timed."

In British Sound Films: The Studio Years 1928–1959 David Quinlan rated the film as "average", writing: "Whodunnit is slow-moving, but keeps you guessing."

Leslie Halliwell said: "Rather solemn, enclosed little mystery which invokes no compulsion to go on watching."

Leonard Maltin gave the film two out of four stars, calling it a "minor drama."
