= 13 East Street =

1952 British crime film

- Directed by: Robert S. Baker
- Written by: John Gilling; Carl Nystrom; Robert S. Baker
- Produced by: Monty Berman; Robert S. Baker
- Starring: Patrick Holt; Sandra Dorne; Sonia Holm
- Cinematography: Monty Berman
- Edited by: Gerald Landau
- Music by: John Lanchbery
- Production company: Tempean Films
- Distributed by: Eros Films
- Release date: March 1952
- Running time: 72 minutes
- Country: United Kingdom
- Language: English

13 East Street is a 1952 British second feature ('B') crime thriller film directed by Robert S. Baker and starring Patrick Holt, Sandra Dorne and Sonia Holm. It was written by John Gilling, Carl Nystrom and Baker and produced by Tempean Films.

== Plot ==
In order to break up a gang trading in stolen goods, a Scotland Yard detective assumes the identity of a criminal and goes undercover. He robs a jewellery shop and is sentenced to prison so that he can gain the confidence of the gang's leaders and infiltrate their organisation.

== Cast ==
- Patrick Holt as Insp. Gerald Blake
- Sandra Dorne as Judy
- Sonia Holm as Joan Blake
- Robert Ayres as Larry Conn
- Dora Bryan as Valerie
- Michael Balfour as Joey Long
- Hector MacGregor as Supt. Duncan
- Michael Brennan as George Mack
- Alan Judd as Sgt. Follett
- Michael Ward as barman
- Alan Gordon as Murray
- Harry Towb as Ray
- Frank Forsyth as prison officer
- Edward Evans as van driver
- Charles Paton as jeweller
- Barry MacGregor as boy with football
- Andreas Malandrinos as cafe owner

== Production ==
The film was shot at Twickenham Studios with some location shooting around London. The film's sets were designed by the art director Andrew Mazzei.

== Reception ==
The Monthly Film Bulletin wrote: "A definite, and quite successful, attempt has been made to emulate the undercover man tradition of the F.B.I. Substitute a London location for any such American film, and you surely arrive at 13 East Street. Conventionally, but adequately, plotted and executed."

Kine Weekly wrote: "The picture has one or two loose ends and a few careless technical faults, but otherwise it's spirited and exciting pulp fiction. The principal players set a good pace and there is just enough sex to colour its rugged, if familiar, rough stuff."

Picture Show wrote: "There is plenty of action, it is agreeably acted and authentic London backgrounds lend interest."

Picturegoer wrote: "Lively and workmanlike thriller, with well-sustained tension and plenty of suspense. ... In a fast-moving climax, a chase over rooftops is particularly exciting. Backgrounds and characterizations are right in key, while competent acting makes the best of the tale. ... Modest, but satisfying."

In British Sound Films: The Studio Years 1928–1959 David Quinlan rated the film as "average", writing: "Conventional crime 'B' with good chase climax."
