= Delayed Action =

1954 British film by John Harlow

- Theatrical release poster
- Directed by: John Harlow
- Written by: Geoffrey Orme
- Produced by: Robert S. Baker; Monty Berman
- Starring: Robert Ayres; June Thorburn; Alan Wheatley; Bruce Seton
- Cinematography: Gerald Gibbs
- Edited by: Bill Lewthwaite
- Music by: John Lanchbery
- Production company: Kenilworth Film Productions
- Distributed by: General Film Distributors
- Release date: 6 September 1954
- Running time: 58 minutes
- Country: United Kingdom
- Language: English

Delayed Action is a 1954 British second feature ('B') film noir mystery film directed by John Harlow and starring Robert Ayres, June Thorburn and Alan Wheatley. It was written by Geoffrey Orme, produced by Robert S. Baker and Monty Berman for Kenilworth Film Productions and released by General Film Distributors.

== Plot ==
Two criminals do a deal with a suicidal man, who will confess to crimes they have committed before killing himself. However he subsequently has a change of heart.

== Cast ==
- Robert Ayres as Ned Ellison
- June Thorburn as Anne Curlew
- Alan Wheatley as Mark Cruden
- Bruce Seton as Sellars
- Michael Balfour as Honey
- Michael Kelly as Lobb
- John Horsley as Worsley
- Olive Kirby as Angela Bentley
- Ballard Berkeley as Insp. Crane
- Ian Fleming as Dr. Jepson
- Myrtle Reed as Jackie
- Dennis Chinnery as bank cashier
- Charles Lamb as bank clerk
- Arthur Hewlett as Battersby (uncredited)
- Frederick Leister as Sir Francis Henry (uncredited)

== Production ==
It was shot at Twickenham Studios in London with sets designed by the art director Wilfred Arnold.

== Critical reception ==
The Monthly Film Bulletin wrote: "The confused and ragged script leaves many points of this improbable story unexplained. Both production and acting are unconvincing, and for a thriller the film is remarkably lacking in thrills."

Kine Weekly wrote: "Cock-and-bull cameo crime melodrama. ... Wildly incredible and all loose ends, it fails to make sense, let alone carry conviction. Third-rate quota second."

TV Guide wrote, "Robbers pay suicidal writer Ayres to confess to their crime and kill himself should their scheme fail. An interesting premise in an otherwise dull movie."

Radio Times noted, "The prolific B-team of Monty Berman and Robert S Baker were the brains behind this moody little thriller. There's a hint here of the ingenuity that would lead to their TV success with such series as The Saint and Randall and Hopkirk (Deceased)."
