= The Flesh and the Fiends =

1960 British film by John Gilling

- UK theatrical release poster
- Directed by: John Gilling
- Screenplay by: John Gilling; Leon Griffiths
- Story by: John Gilling
- Produced by: Robert S. Baker; Monty Berman
- Starring: Peter Cushing; June Laverick; Donald Pleasence; George Rose
- Cinematography: Monty Berman
- Edited by: Jack Slade
- Music by: Stanley Black
- Production company: Triad Productions
- Distributed by: Regal Film Distributors (UK)
- Release date: 2 February 1960 (UK)
- Running time: 94 minutes
- Country: United Kingdom
- Language: English
- Budget: approximately £55,000

The Flesh and the Fiends (released in the United States as Mania; also known as The Fiendish Ghouls and Psycho Killers) is a 1960 British horror film directed by John Gilling, from a screenplay co-written with Leon Griffiths, and starring Peter Cushing, June Laverick, Donald Pleasence and George Rose. It is based on the true case of Burke and Hare, who murdered at least 16 people in 1828 Edinburgh and sold their bodies for anatomical research.

The film was released in the United Kingdom by Regal Film Distributors on February 2, 1960.

== Plot ==
In 1828 Edinburgh, Dr Robert Knox is a highly skilled anatomist who draws large crowds of medical students to his lectures on the human body. Though he is constantly at odds with his stuffy, backwards colleagues, he is highly venerated by his students and believes it is his duty is to push the medical profession forward. Unfortunately, due to the era's laws, very few cadavers are legally available to the medical profession. This necessitates the use of graverobbers or "Resurrection men" to procure additional specimens. Dr Knox's assistant, Geoffrey Mitchell, and a young student named Chris Jackson are given the task of buying the bodies, which are worth a small fortune, especially when fresh.

Meanwhile, drunken miscreants William Burke and William Hare discover that a lodger at Burke's boarding house has died still owing £4 in rent. Having learned hat the body can make them a handsome profit, they begin a career of murdering locals and selling them to the medical school. When Jackson goes to a local tavern to give Burke and Hare their pay, he becomes involved with tempestuous local prostitute Mary Patterson who is also well known to the killers.

Over time, Jackson and Mitchell begin to suspect that the bodies supplied by Burke and Hare are victims of foul play. Despite his concerns, Dr Knox dismisses any attempt at going to the police. When Jackson's new girlfriend Mary becomes their latest victim, Jackson discovers her body in the lecture room. He too is killed when he confronts the murderous duo.

When Burke and Hare murder a well-known mentally-ill youth, however, they quickly become murder suspects and are caught by an angry mob. Hare agrees to turn King's Evidence against his former partner and is set free, though vindictive locals catch him and burn out his eyes. Burke is executed by hanging, still complaining that Dr Knox never paid him for the final body.

Knox, for his part in the killings, is the object of widespread public outrage, but ultimately not punished or censured by his colleagues (to whom Dr Mitchell eloquently defends him). Though he is free to continue lecturing, he ultimately feels guilt over his part in the horrors, admitting to his devoted niece Martha that the murder victims "seemed so small in my scheme of things. But I knew how they died."

The film ends with Knox, who assumes his lectures will now be empty, instead finding himself greeted with applause from a packed hall of students. Apparently a changed man, he begins his lecture with the Hippocratic Oath which includes the promise to "never do harm to anyone."

== Cast ==
- Peter Cushing as Dr Robert Knox
- June Laverick as Martha Knox
- Donald Pleasence as William Hare
- George Rose as William Burke
- Renée Houston as Helen Burke
- Dermot Walsh as Dr. Geoffrey Mitchell
- Billie Whitelaw as Mary Patterson
- John Cairney as Chris Jackson
- Melvyn Hayes as Daft Jamie
- June Powell as Maggie O'Hara
- Andrew Faulds as Inspector McCulloch
- Philip Leaver as Dr. Elliott
- George Woodbridge as Dr. Ferguson
- Garard Green as Dr. Andrews
- Esma Cannon as Aggie
- Raf De La Torre as grave robber
- Steven Berkoff as a medical student (uncredited)

== Production ==
Writer/ Producer John Gilling, along with producers Robert S. Baker and Monty Berman of Tempean Films, formed Triad Productions specifically to make the film. It was the first horror movie to feature Peter Cushing that was not produced by Hammer Films.

Gilling had previously written the film The Greed of William Hart (1948) about Burke and Hare. At that time, however, the British Board of Film Censors demanded that all references to the real-life killers were removed, and so Gilling was forced to rename the killers and several other key characters. The Flesh and the Fiends restores the correct historical names and begins with the text: "[this] is a story of vice and murder. We make no apologies to the dead. It is all true." However, the filmmakers were still not permitted to use Burke and Hare's name in the title, and chief censor John Trevelyan called Baker to his office to discuss his concerns about several "potentially offensive sequences," though the film was ultimately passed uncut with an "X" rating.

To minimize any similarities to Gilling's previous film (and to the then-unproduced script on the same subject by Dylan Thomas, which would eventually be produced in 1985 as The Doctor and the Devils), the film's producers brought in Leon Griffiths to rewrite Gilling's original screenplay.

In his autobiography, Cushing – famed for his portrayal of Victor Frankenstein in 1957's The Curse of Frankenstein –compared the role of Dr Knox to his most famous character: "Now it seemed to me that Knox and 'Frankenstein' had a lot in common. The minds of these exceptional men were driven by a single desire: to inquire into the unknown. Ahead of their time, like most great scientists, their work and motives were misunderstood."

The drooping left eye which Cushing uses in his performance (emphasized in some film posters, though not in the American one) is accurate to the real Dr Knox, who had his left eye destroyed and his face disfigured by smallpox he contracted as an infant.

== Reception ==
The film has been described as a "box office disappointment," or a film which did "average business." However Kinematograph Weekly reported it made "a big impression" at the box office.

In February 1960 Kinematograph Weekly wrote "I hardly expected the best people to rave about “ The Flesh And The Fiends "’ (Regal — Dyaliscope—British) and they didn’t. But no matter, the full-blooded melodrama concerning notorious body-snatchers Burke and Hare is, as was confidently anticipated by most astute bookers, scoring fluently at the Rialto, Coventry Street. It’s well to remember that horror films, unlike their TV counterparts, do not play to captive audiences. They ring the belli simply because a large section of the public likes spine-chilling fare."

The Monthly Film Bulletin wrote: "The attempt to do justice to the drama of medical ethics, centred on Dr Knox and the celebrated horrors of Burke and Hare and with a torrid, time-consuming sub-plot about a prostitute thrown in, leads to continual changes of mood and interest that weaken the film's total effect. The more rhetorical medical school sections are inevitably overshadowed by the brisk gruesomeness of the many murder scenes, though there is little effort to build tension in these, and the studio sets fail to capture the grim atmosphere pervading many of Edinburgh's closes even today. Corpses toppling into brine baths, a rat hunt and a blinding provide most of the ghoulishness. Peter Cushing offers his usual polished performance, but the Oirish dialogue given to George Rose and Donald Pleasence makes them more comic than sinister."

Variety praised Cushing's performance as a "most effective study in single-minded integrity which knits the film together admirably."

The Radio Times Guide to Films gave the film 3/5 stars, writing: "This explicitly scary and darkly atmospheric retelling of the Burke and Hare story stars Peter Cushing, exceptional as the coldly ambitious Dr Knox ... The grimy poverty of 19th-century Edinburgh provides a vivid background to this unflinching shocker, which uses stark black-and-white imagery to startling effect."

In British Sound Films: The Studio Years 1928–1959 David Quinlan rated the film as "average", writing: "Busy, grisly shocker whose best asset is its period feel."

Film and Filming's Ian Moss criticized the film, writing "I can't understand anyone wishing to see this film voluntarily," and arguing that the script afforded the characters no depth.

In recent years, it has enjoyed something of a stronger critical reappraisal as a cult film. Reviewing the 2001 DVD release by Image Entertainment, critic Glenn Erickson praised the acting as "first rate," and added, "The production values of The Flesh and the Fiends outshine the House of Hammer.... The film is lacking in outright grue and gore but the tone is perfect."

== Versions ==
Several cuts of the film have circulated in different markets. The currently available DVD from Image Entertainment lists the runtime for the "uncut" original theatrical version at 94 minutes, with a slightly extended "Continental" version – produced for European markets with more permissive censors – running at 95 minutes and including short sequences or alternate takes with more nudity.

The film was released by Valiant in the USA under the titles Mania and Psycho Killers using the British theatrical cut, but a later 1965 re-release by Pacemaker Pictures under the title The Fiendish Ghouls cut 23 minutes from the film's runtime. Both the UK and the continental cuts of the film are included on the DVD from Image Entertainment. Kino Lorber released the film on Blu-ray on July 7, 2020. The disc contains both the "Continental" version and the alternate cut under the title The Fiendish Ghouls aka Mania.

== See also ==
- The Greed of William Hart (1948)
- Burke & Hare (1971)
- The Doctor and the Devils (1985)
- Burke & Hare (Comedy, 2010)
