= Hour of Decision (film) =

1957 British mystery directed by C.M. Pennington-Richards

- Theatrical release poster
- Directed by: C. M. Pennington-Richards
- Written by: Norman Hudis
- Based on: Murder in Mayfair by Frederic Goldsmith
- Produced by: Monty Berman
- Starring: Jeff Morrow; Hazel Court; Anthony Dawson
- Cinematography: Stanley Pavey
- Edited by: Douglas Myers
- Music by: Stanley Black
- Production company: Tempean Films
- Distributed by: Eros Films; Astor Pictures (US)
- Release date: 27 May 1957
- Running time: 81 minutes
- Country: United Kingdom
- Language: English

Hour of Decision is a 1957 British mystery film directed by C. M. Pennington-Richards and starring Jeff Morrow, Hazel Court and Anthony Dawson. It was written by Norman Hudis based on the 1954 novel Murder in Mayfair by Frederic Goldsmith.

== Plot ==
The British wife of an American journalist begins receiving letters blackmailing her over a love affair. Suspicion points to her when the blackmailer is found murdered.

== Cast ==
- Jeff Morrow as Joe Sanders
- Hazel Court as Margaret Sanders/Peggy
- Anthony Dawson as Gary Bax
- Mary Laura Wood as Olive Bax
- Alan Gifford as J. Foster Green
- Carl Bernard as Inspector Gower
- Lionel Jeffries as Albert Mayne
- Anthony Snell as Andrew Crest
- Vanda Godsell as Eileen Chadwick
- Robert Sansom as Reece Chadwick
- Garard Green as Tony Pendleton
- Marne Maitland as club waiter
- Arthur Lowe as calligraphy expert
- Margaret Allworthy as Denise March
- Richard Shaw as Detective Sergeant Dale
- Frank Atkinson as caretaker
- Michael Balfour as barman
- Reginald Hearne as Personnel Manager
- Dennis Chinnery as studio photographer

== Production ==
The film was shot at Walton Studios with location shooting around London. The film's sets were designed by the art director Arthur Lawson.

== Critical response ==
Monthly Film Bulletin said: "A hackneyed and lethargically told murder mystery, with a solution more dependent on coincidence than logic. Lionel Jeffries' assured performance as a jaded nightclub proprietor provides the film's most satisfying scenes."

Kine Weekly wrote: "Ingenious and holding who-dunnit. ... The red herrings are neatly manipulated by a competent cast and resourceful director against appropriate London backgrounds, and the twist ending is theatrically effective."

In British Sound Films: The Studio Years 1928–1959 David Quinlan rated the film as "mediocre", writing: "Too-leisurely whodunnit at least hides its villain well."

Leslie Halliwell said: "A familiar type of second feature whodunit, with little about it to spark enthusiasm."
