= Deadly Nightshade (film) =

1953 British film by John Gilling

- DVD cover
- Directed by: John Gilling
- Screenplay by: Lawrence Huntington
- Produced by: Robert S. Baker; Monty Berman
- Starring: Emrys Jones; Zena Marshall; John Horsley
- Cinematography: Monty Berman
- Edited by: Sidney Hayers
- Music by: John Lanchbery
- Production company: Kenilworth Film Productions
- Distributed by: General Film Distributors (UK)
- Release date: March 1953 (UK)
- Running time: 61 minutes
- Country: United Kingdom
- Language: English

Deadly Nightshade is a 1953 British second feature ('B') crime drama film directed by John Gilling and starring Emrys Jones, Zena Marshall and John Horsley. The screenplay was by Lawrence Huntington. A convict on the run switches identities with a lookalike, only to find himself in even deeper trouble.

== Plot ==
Robert Matthews is mistakenly arrested by police who believe he is escaped convict Barlow, whom he resembles. After Matthews' release, Barlow hatches a plot to kidnap Matthews and assume his identity. When he approaches Matthews he resists and Matthews is killed. Barlow steals Matthews' identity and lives in his cottage. He subsequently discovers that Matthews was a traitor, and helps the police round up his treacherous gang.

== Cast ==
- Emrys Jones as Matthews / Barlow
- Zena Marshall as Ann Farrington
- John Horsley as Inspector Clements
- Joan Hickson as Mrs. Fenton
- Hector Ross as Canning
- Roger Maxwell as Colonel Smythe
- Lesley Deane as Mrs. Smythe
- Marne Maitland as Heinz
- Frederick Piper as Mr. Pritchard

== Critical reception ==
The Monthly Film Bulletin wrote: "The various red herrings which keep on cropping up in this film are nobody's business, but it is all quite jolly and thrilling in its standard British second feature way."

Kine Weekly wrote: "The picture contains more talk than action, and the comedy relief is a bit heavy-handed, but competent performances by Emrys Jones, Zena Marshall and John Horsley prevent the interest from flagging."

Picturegoer wrote: "Emrys Jones gives a sensitive performance in the dual role, and his girl friend, played by Zena Marshall, and the police inspector (John Horsley) work hard. A conventional, but satisfying seat-gripper."

Picture Show wrote: "Ingenious melodrama of an escaped convict who, having killed his double, impersonates him until he learns that he been a saboteur engaged in smuggling atomic secrets out of the country. How the gang is subsequently rounded up causes plenty of suspense and brisk action. It is competently acted and directed."

TV Guide thought the idea was "done much better in Antonioni's The Passenger (1975)," but found the film, "still occasionally entertaining."

The Radio Times wrote, "In spite of its penury, this typical 1950s British crime quickie ... is curiously engaging...Although director John Gilling throws in a few Cornish coastal views, he's mostly confined to unconvincing sets, though the cheapskate look only adds to the charm."

In British Sound Films: The Studio Years 1928–1959 David Quinlan rated the film as "average", writing: "Conventional 'B' picture with plenty of incident."
