= A Date with a Dream =

1948 British film by Dicky Leeman

- Directed by: Dicky Leeman
- Written by: Robert S. Baker; Monty Berman; Dicky Leeman; Carl Nystrom
- Produced by: Robert S. Baker; Monty Berman
- Starring: Terry-Thomas; Jeannie Carson; Len Lowe; Bill Lowe
- Cinematography: Monty Berman
- Edited by: Anne Barker
- Production company: Tempean Films
- Distributed by: Grand National Pictures
- Release date: November 1948
- Running time: 55 minutes
- Country: United Kingdom
- Language: English

A Date with a Dream is a 1948 British musical comedy film directed by Dicky Leeman and starring Terry-Thomas, Jeannie Carson and Wally Patch. It was written by Robert S. Baker, Monty Berman, Leeman and Carl Nystrom. This was one of Terry-Thomas's earliest films and is reputedly partly based on his own experiences. Terry-Thomas was yet to develop his cad persona, and a then little-known Norman Wisdom appears in a very brief, non-speaking role. Its plot concerns a wartime group of musical entertainers who meet up a year after being demobbed and decide to reform their act.

== Plot ==
When an Army concert party is disbanded after the war, they plan to meet up in a years time for a reunion. When they do they discover that all the various members aren't coping too well with civilian life. Jean, a singer who is staying in the same house as two of the ex-concert party members, suggests that the various members get back together to perform.

== Cast ==
- Terry-Thomas as Terry
- Jeannie Carson as Jean
- Len Lowe as Len
- Bill Lowe as Bill
- Wally Patch as uncle
- Vic Lewis as Vic
- Ida Patlanski as Bedelia
- Joey Porter as Max Imshy
- Alfie Dean as Joe
- Julia Lang as Madam Docherty
- Harry Green as Syd Marlish
- Norman Wisdom as shadow in Max's office
- Elton Hayes as singer

== Production ==
A Date With A Dream was the first production of Tempean Films, a production company founded by Monty Berman and Robert S. Baker following their war service. Of the film, Baker later commented, "It didn't make us a penny, but it gave us a good introduction to the film business". Tempean would go on to produce many British B-movies throughout the 1950s and into the early 1960s.

== Critical reception ==
The Monthly Film Bulletin wrote: "This is an amateurish film which is very disjointed, with a weak story as a means of introducing various comedy acts and musical turns. These acts are good in their own sphere, but they do not constitute a good film. Terry Thomas is excellent in his inevitable way, and the music will appeal to those who like jazz."

Kine Weekly wrote: "The team try hard to make good-humoured fun of theatrical folk – irascible managers, explosive booking agents, penniless artistes and suspicious landladies – but their gags lack originality and spontaneity. Noisy rather than laughable, the flm's strongest selling line is its British ticket."

In The Radio Times Guide to Films David Parkinson gave the film 2/5 stars, writing: "In only his second credited role, Terry-Thomas starred in this feeble comedy with brothers Len and Bill Lowe, playing the members of an ENSA trio who reunite after the war to revive their hopes of showbiz success. The nightclub routines are pretty awful and director Dicky Leeman hasn't a clue how to structure a narrative. But Jean Carson spares everyone's blushes as the girl they all fall for, and Norman Wisdom makes his feature debut."

Sky Movies wrote, "a sparkling performance from the young Terry-Thomas and a bright, sassy attitude saves this dated, rather choppy little filler item from the scrapheap of movie history. Worth a look for nostalgia buffs and curio collectors".
