= Reluctant Bride =

1955 British film by Henry Cass

The Reluctant Bride
- Theatrical release poster
- Directed by: Henry Cass
- Written by: Frederick Stephani
- Produced by: Robert S. Baker; Monty Berman
- Starring: John Carroll; Virginia Bruce; Brian Oulton; Kay Callard; Arthur Lowe
- Cinematography: Monty Berman
- Edited by: Maurice Rootes
- Music by: Stanley Black
- Distributed by: Eros Films
- Release date: August 1955
- Running time: 75 minutes
- Country: United Kingdom
- Language: English

The Reluctant Bride (U.S. title: Two Grooms for a Bride) is a 1955 British comedy film directed by Henry Cass and starring John Carroll and Virginia Bruce. It was written by Frederick Stephani.

== Plot summary ==
Jeff Longstreet and Laura Weeks are paired together to take care of a group of wild children whose parents are lost on an African safari. The children make attempts to press Jeff and Laura into a romantic relationship while breaking them away from their fiancees.

== Partial cast ==
- John Carroll as Jeff Longstreet
- Virginia Bruce as Laura Weeks
- Brian Oulton as Professor Baker
- Kay Callard as Lola Sinclair
- Donald Stewart as Cadwell
- Arthur Lowe as Mr. Fogarty
- Michael Caridia as Tony
- Barbara Brown as Ra
- Kit Terrington as Big

== Critical reception ==
The Monthly Film Bulletin wrote: "Although the material of this comedy is familiar enough, the treatment is moderately lively, with some bright dialogue capably put over by Virginia Bruce and John Carroll. Minor characters, such as the vicar and the neighbours, are out of stock, but the film on the whole makes quite good-humoured entertainment."

The Daily Film Renter wrote: "Hnsry Cass's direction, with its truth of observation and its flair for making the ordinary appear amusing, keeps this modest-budget comedy entertaining all the time. Family audiences in particular should revel in its innocent fun and games. It is well acted and its script contains plenty of amusing lines even if its outcome is fairly apparent from the outset."

Kine Weekly wrote: "The picture has the earmarks of a stage play, but resourceful team work and direction irons them out, John Carroll makes a breezy, likeable Jeff, Virginia Bruce is a delightful Laura, Brian Oulton scores as the asinine Theodore, and Michael Caridia, Barbara Brown and Kit Terrington never let up as the mischievous Tony, Ra and Big. The settings are appropriate and the timing of salient situations perfect."

The Radio Times called it a "Far-fetched comedy" and rated it two out of five stars.

In British Sound Films: The Studio Years 1928–1959 David Quinlan rated the film as "average", writing: "Two Hollywood stars polish up some familiar comedy material."

Sky Cinema wrote "Hollywood stars Virginia Bruce and John Carroll help to give a top coating of sophistication to this feather-light British comedy."
