= Melody Club (film) =

- Directed by: Robert S. Baker; Monty Berman
- Written by: Carl Nystrom
- Produced by: Robert S. Baker; Monty Berman
- Starring: Terry-Thomas; Gwynneth Vaughan; Michael Balfour
- Cinematography: Peter Newbrook
- Edited by: Gerald Landau
- Music by: Ralph Sharon
- Production company: Tempean Films
- Distributed by: Eros Films (UK)
- Release date: July 1949 (UK)
- Running time: 67 minutes
- Country: United Kingdom
- Language: English

Melody Club is a 1949 British second feature ('B') comedy musical film directed by Robert S. Baker and Monty Berman and starring Terry-Thomas, Gwynneth Vaughan and Michael Balfour. It was written by Carl Nystrom and made at Kensington Studios.

== Plot ==
Detective Freddy Forrester, chasing jewel thieves, traces them to a nightclub.

== Cast ==
- Terry-Thomas as Freddy Forrester
- Gwynneth Vaughan as Jean
- Michael Balfour as Max Calypso
- Len Lowe as Tony
- Bill Lowe as Birdie
- Lilian Grey as Cora
- Arthur Gomez as Inspector Dodds
- Anthony Shaw as General Blitzem
- Sylvia Clarke as Susie
- Jack Mayne as Hector
- Ida Patlanski as Hector's wife

== Reception ==
The Monthly Film Bulletin wrote: "Low-budget British comedy: worn-out gags."

Picturegoer wrote: "A sheer piece of nonsense with bad dialogue and jokes. Terry Thomas burlesques as a nitwit detective on the trail of jewel thieves. Ultimately, he catches them, but it would have been better if they had disappeared completely, for we should not have had to endure the unfortunate Terry in so many poor and embarrassing disguises. The supporting cast unfortunately gives no support owing largely to the lack of opportunity."

In British Sound Films: The Studio Years 1928–1959 David Quinlan rated the film as "poor", writing: "Collection of well-worn jokes stitched together to make a plot."
