= Recoil (1953 film) =

British crime film by John Gilling

- Elizabeth Sellars and Kieron Moore
- Directed by: John Gilling
- Written by: John Gilling
- Produced by: Robert S. Baker; Monty Berman
- Starring: Kieron Moore; Elizabeth Sellars; Edward Underdown
- Cinematography: Monty Berman
- Edited by: Sidney Hayers
- Music by: Stanley Black
- Production company: Tempean Films
- Distributed by: Eros Films
- Release date: August 1953
- Running time: 79 minutes
- Country: United Kingdom
- Language: English

Recoil is a 1953 British 'B' crime film directed and written by John Gilling and starring Kieron Moore, Elizabeth Sellars and Edward Underdown.

== Plot ==
When thieves rob and murder her jeweller father, Jean Talbot resolves to bring them to justice by posing as a criminal and infiltrating their gang. She builds up evidence against her father's murderer by pretending to be in love with him.

== Cast ==
- Kieron Moore as Nicholas Conway
- Elizabeth Sellars as Jean Talbot
- Edward Underdown as Michael Conway
- John Horsley as Inspector Trubridge
- Robert Raglan as Sergeant Perkins
- Ethel O'Shea as Mrs. Conway
- Martin Benson as Farnborough
- Michael Kelly as Crouch
- Anthony Pelly as Bentock
- Derek Blomfield as Wilbur
- Robert Moore as Roger
- John Watson as Paul
- Bill Lowe as Walters
- Michael Balfour as Parkes
- Mike McCarthy as Taxi Driver
- Ian Fleming as Talbot
- Marguerite Brennan as Michael's Maid
- Louise Grainger as Michael's Nurse
- Daphne Newton as Miss Crall
- Sam Kydd as Ticket Collector

== Production ==
It was filmed at Alliance Studios in Twickenham.

== Critical reception ==
The Monthly Film Bulletin wrote: "A moderately exciting and realistically told thriller; the playing generally is adequate and the story keeps up a fair pace."

Kine Weekly wrote: "Actionful crime melodrama, realistically staged. ...Elizabeth Sellars, Kieron Moore and Edward Underdown handle the robust, if far-fetched, plot with skill and see that there are no serious let-ups between its exciting opening and even more suspenseful 'curtain.' ... The picture tells a meaty tale and, what's more, serves it hot. Elizabeth Sellars wins sympathy as the fearless yet feminine Jean, and Kieron Moore and Edward Underdown score in contrast and subtly heighten the subsidiary triangle love interest as Nicholas and Michael, Martin Benson also registers as Farnborough. Salient situations carry a kick and the London nocturnal backgrounds are authentic."

Picture Show wrote: "Elizabeth Sellars, as the heroine, and Kieron Moore and Edward Underdown, as the brothers, give convincing performances and are well supported by the rest of the cast."

Chibnall and McFarlane in The British 'B' Film wrote: "It was not the most plausible of plots, but it was effectively handled."

In British Sound Films: The Studio Years 1928–1959 David Quinlan rated the film as "average", writing: "Compact low-budget thriller."

TV Guide called the film "a taut and action-filled programmer."
