= Stormy Crossing =

1958 British film by C. M. Pennington-Richards

- U.S. poster
- Directed by: C. M. Pennington-Richards
- Screenplay by: Brock Williams
- Based on: original story Black Tide by Sid Harris & Lou Dyer
- Produced by: Monty Berman
- Starring: John Ireland; Derek Bond; Leslie Dwyer
- Cinematography: Geoffrey Faithfull
- Edited by: Doug Myers
- Music by: Stanley Black
- Production company: Tempean Films
- Distributed by: Eros Films (UK)
- Release date: August 1958 (UK)
- Running time: 79 mins
- Country: United Kingdom
- Language: English

Stormy Crossing (U.S. title: Black Tide) is a 1958 British second feature ('B') crime, drama, thriller, mystery film directed by C. M. Pennington-Richards and starring John Ireland, Derek Bond, Leslie Dwyer, and Maureen Connell. It was written by Brock Williams based on the original story ''Black Tide'' by Sid Harris and Lou Dyer.

== Plot ==
Two swimmers attempt to swim across the English Channel but, under cover of fog, one of them is deliberately drowned by her lover after she demands he leave his rich wife for her or she will tell his wife about their affair. Officially, her death is ruled an accident, but her fellow swimmer is convinced that it was not. His swimming coach is initially doubtful, but when he realizes he has been deliberately lied to, he investigates and brings the villain to justice.

== Cast ==
- John Ireland as Griff Parker
- Derek Bond as Paul Seymour
- Leslie Dwyer as Bill Harris, Kitty's trainer
- Maureen Connell as Shelley Baxter
- Sheldon Lawrence as Danny Parker, Griff's brother
- Joy Webster as Kitty Tyndall
- John Horsley as Detective Inspector Parry
- Cameron Hall as Grantly Memorial doctor
- Arthur Lowe as garage owner
- John Schlesinger as Tim, garage mechanic
- Anita Sharp-Bolster as first nurse
- Patricia Ellis as pretty young nurse
- Jack Taylor as race navigator
- Reginald Hearne as Police Sergeant Masters
- Graham Stewart as Bob McEwan, Clarion reporter
- Frank Atkinson as Joe, night porter
- Sam Rockett as swim organiser

== Production ==
It was made at Southall Studios in West London.

== Reception ==
The Monthly Film Bulletin wrote: "The Channel racing background, intended to give some freshness to a tired story, eventually deprives this melodrama of much of its plausibility. Seymour's motives are never made convincing, and coincidence is stretched to the limit in the clues which lead to his being unmasked. Among the actors John Ireland and Maureen Connell stand up best to the improbabilities of the story."

Picturegoer wrote: "Both the acting the direction lack subtlety."

Variety wrote: "This naive, dull little number may rate second billing in minor houses. It's a pity the pic isn't better fare because it has the service of some capable performers, and also has the merit of a novel background for murder, a Channel swim setting, But the film offers no surprises and flounders through old-fashioned dialog and direction plus uninspired thesping."

In British Sound Films: The Studio Years 1928–1959 David Quinlan rated the film as "mediocre", writing: "Unsubtle treatment kills thriller."
