= John Gilling =

English film director and screenwriter (1912–1984)

- Born: 29 May 1912; London, England
- Died: 22 November 1984 (aged 72); Madrid, Spain
- Occupations: Film director, screenwriter, producer
- Years active: 1935–1975

John Gilling (29 May 1912 – 22 November 1984) was an English director, writer, and producer of film and television. He was known for his horror movies, especially those he made for Hammer Films, for whom he directed The Shadow of the Cat (1961), The Plague of the Zombies (1966), The Reptile (1966) and The Mummy's Shroud (1967).

== Biography ==
Born and raised in London, Gilling left a job in England with an oil company at the age of 17 and spent a period in Hollywood, working in the film industry some of the time, before returning to England in 1933. He entered the British film industry immediately as an editor and assistant director, starting with Father O'Flynn. He served in the Royal Navy in the Second World War.

After the war, Gilling wrote the script for Black Memory (1947), and made his directing debut with Escape from Broadmoor (1948). Gilling also produced and directed Old Mother Riley Meets the Vampire (a.k.a. Vampire Over London / My Son the Vampire) in 1952. Gilling continued through the 1950s making second features such as The Voice of Merrill for Monty Berman's Tempean Films and entered television directing in several British series that received international distribution such as Douglas Fairbanks, Jr., Presents and Gideon's Way, as well as Monty Berman's The Saint, The Champions, and Department S. Of his films for Tempean, the film historians Steve Chibnall and Brian McFarlane wrote: "Gilling shows in all of them a capacity for establishing the premises of his plots economically and evocatively, for developing them with clarity and speed, for giving competent players a chance to invest their characters with a feeling and detail that go beyond stereotype, and for making deft use of limited locations and settings".

Starting in 1956, Gilling directed and wrote several films for Albert R. Broccoli and Irving Allen's Warwick Films beginning with Odongo. Perhaps his very best film as a director is The Flesh and the Fiends (1959), the story of Dr. Robert Knox and the West Port murders, which starred Peter Cushing and Donald Pleasence. For his own production company, John Gilling Enterprises, he made Fury at Smugglers' Bay in 1961.

Gilling began directing for Hammer Films in 1961, with The Shadow of the Cat, following years of writing screenplays for the studio starting with The Man in Black (1948). He achieved his greatest attention with several of their horror films such as The Plague of the Zombies and The Reptile, as well as making the non-horror Hammer films The Pirates of Blood River (1962) and The Scarlet Blade (1963). Gilling also directed the crime thriller The Challenge starring Anthony Quayle and Jayne Mansfield, the science fiction film The Night Caller (1965) starring John Saxon and Maurice Denham, and the second Charles Vine spy movie Where the Bullets Fly (1966).

Following a final round of work in British television Gilling relocated to Spain, where he came out of retirement in 1975 to make Cross of the Devil, his final film. He died in Madrid in 1984.

== Filmography ==
=== Film ===
==== Director ====
- Escape from Broadmoor (1948)
- A Matter of Murder (1949)
- No Trace (1950)
- The Quiet Woman (1951)
- The Frightened Man (1952)
- Mother Riley Meets the Vampire (1952)
- The Voice of Merrill (1952)
- Deadly Nightshade (1953)
- Recoil (1953)
- Escape by Night (1953)
- Three Steps to the Gallows (1953)
- Double Exposure (1954)
- The Embezzler (1954)
- Destination Milan (1954)
- The Gilded Cage (1955)
- Tiger by the Tail (1955)
- Odongo (1956)
- The Gamma People (1956)
- Interpol (1957)
- High Flight (1957)
- The Man Inside (1958)
- The Bandit of Zhobe (1959)
- Idol on Parade (1959)
- The Flesh and the Fiends (1960)
- The Challenge (1960)
- Fury at Smugglers' Bay (1961)
- The Shadow of the Cat (1961)
- The Pirates of Blood River (1962)
- Panic (1963)
- The Scarlet Blade (1964)
- The Brigand of Kandahar (1965)
- The Night Caller (1965)
- Where the Bullets Fly (1966)
- The Plague of the Zombies (1966)
- The Reptile (1966)
- The Mummy's Shroud (1967)
- La cruz del diablo (1975)

==== Screenwriter ====
- Black Memory (1947)
- A Gunman Has Escaped (1948)
- The Greed of William Hart (1948)
- House of Darkness (1948)
- Man in Black (1949)
- The Man from Yesterday (1949)
- A Matter of Murder (1949)
- The Lady Craved Excitement (1950)
- Guilt Is My Shadow (1950)
- Room to Let (1950)
- No Trace (1950)
- Blackout (1950)
- Dark Interval (1950)
- The Rossiter Case (1951)
- The Quiet Woman (1951) (co-written, with Ruth Adam)
- Chelsea Story (1951)
- Blind Man's Bluff (1952)
- Whispering Smith Hits London (1952)
- The Frightened Man (1952)
- 13 East Street (1952)
- Wings of Danger (1952)
- King of the Underworld (1952)
- The Lost Hours (1952)
- The Voice of Merrill (1952)
- The Steel Key (1953)
- Recoil (1953)
- Escape by Night (1953)
- Three Steps to the Gallows (1953)
- Double Exposure (1954)
- The Embezzler (1954)
- Profile (1954)
- Windfall (1955)
- Tiger by the Tail (1955)
- Bond of Fear (1956)
- Odongo (1956)
- The Gamma People (1956)
- The Man Inside (1958)
- The Bandit of Zhobe (1959)
- Killers of Kilimanjaro (1959)
- The Flesh and the Fiends (1960)
- The Challenge (1960)
- Fury at Smugglers' Bay (1961)
- The Pirates of Blood River (1962)
- Panic (1963)
- The Scarlet Blade (1964)
- The Gorgon (1964)
- The Secret of Blood Island (1964)
- The Brigand of Kandahar (1965)
- The Mummy's Shroud (1967)
- Trog (1970)
- La cruz del diablo (1975)
