= The Steel Key =

1953 British film by Robert S. Baker

- Original Australian daybill poster
- Directed by: Robert S. Baker
- Written by: John Gilling; Roy Chanslor
- Produced by: Robert S. Baker; Monty Berman
- Starring: Terence Morgan; Joan Rice; Raymond Lovell
- Cinematography: Gerald Gibbs
- Edited by: Peter Taylor
- Music by: Frank Cordell
- Production company: Tempean Films
- Distributed by: Eros Films (U.K.)
- Release date: May 1953 (U.K.)
- Running time: 69 min.
- Country: United Kingdom
- Language: English

The Steel Key is a 1953 British second feature 'B' thriller film directed by Robert S. Baker and starring Terence Morgan, Joan Rice and Raymond Lovell. It was written by John Gilling and Roy Chanslor.

== Plot ==
Adventurer Johnny O'Flynn attempts to track down thieves who have stolen a secret military formula for producing hardened steel; but ruthless others who will stop at nothing are also on the trail.

== Cast ==
- Terence Morgan as Johnny O'Flynn
- Joan Rice as Doreen Wilson
- Raymond Lovell as Inspector Forsythe
- Dianne Foster as Sylvia Newman
- Hector Ross as Beroni
- Colin Tapley as Doctor Crabtree
- Esmond Knight as Professor Newman
- Arthur Lovegrove as Gilchrist
- Sam Kydd as chauffeur
- Esma Cannon as patient in doctor's waiting room
- Michael Balfour as sailor
- Tom Gill as hotel receptionist
- Cyril Smith as boat owner (uncredited)
- Ben Williams as taxi driver (uncredited)

== Critical reception ==
The Monthly Film Bulletin said "An indifferent thriller, whose stock characters and situations fail either to convince or to excite. A humdrum production is scarcely relieved by Raymond Lovell's performance as a blundering Inspector."

Kine Weekly wrote "Crowded and ingenuous "cops-and robbers" staged in and around London. ... The picture occasionally allows its lively sense of humour to remove the edge off some of its thrills, but otherwise it's hearty, actionful and disarmingly ingenuous 'Boys' Own Paper'."

TV Guide gave the film two out of five stars, calling it a "Silly spy drama ... The complicated plot doesn't quite work, but audiences should enjoy it anyway."

Allmovie wrote, "a little-known British melodrama with some potent talent involved, including actors Terence Morgan and Joan Rice and future Saint director Robert Baker".

In British Sound Films: The Studio Years 1928–1959 David Quinlan rated the film as "average", writing: "Light thriller is quite unconvincing, but so hectic it almost gets away with it."
