= Escape by Night (1953 film) =

British drama by John Gilling

- Directed by: John Gilling
- Written by: John Gilling
- Produced by: Robert S. Baker; Monty Berman
- Starring: Bonar Colleano; Sid James; Andrew Ray; Ted Ray; Simone Silva
- Cinematography: Monty Berman
- Edited by: Gerald Landau
- Music by: Stanley Black
- Production company: Southall Studios
- Distributed by: Eros Films
- Release date: December 1953
- Running time: 79 minutes
- Country: United Kingdom
- Language: English

Escape by Night is a 1953 British second feature ('B') crime film directed and written by John Gilling and starring Bonar Colleano, Andrew Ray, Sid James and Simone Silva.

== Plot ==
Tom Buchan is an alcoholic journalist whose once memorable work has been destroyed by his constant drunken antics that have cost him his future. Buchan boasts to his colleagues that they report news, whilst he makes it. He sees a chance for redemption by getting the life story of Gino Rossi, an Italian crime boss on the run. He wins Rossi's confidence by tipping him off to the police coming to arrest them (after Buchan himself tipped off the police).

The highly suspicious Rossi promises Buchan the rights to his life story as they hide out in an abandoned theatre in return for Buchan, a former pilot, flying him to Italy. Through his nightclub singer girlfriend Rosetta, Rossi becomes suspicious that his brother Guillio plans to take over his gang. They are discovered by a young boy playing games by himself in the theatre; Buchan tells the boy they are Secret Service Agents and enlists the child as a junior secret agent to bring them food and supplies and to deliver Buchan's stories to his editor and messages to Rosetta.

Due to Buchan's disappearance his editor places a £500 reward in the media for news of the two men.

== Cast ==
- Bonar Colleano as Tom Buchan
- Andrew Ray as Joey Weston
- Sid James as Gino Rossi
- Ted Ray as Mr. Weston
- Simone Silva as Rosetta Mantania
- Patrick Barr as Inspector Frampton
- Peter Sinclair as MacNaughton
- Avice Landone as Mrs. Weston
- Ronald Adam as Tallboy
- Eric Berry as Con Blair
- Martin Benson as Guillio
- Ronan O'Casey as Pietro
- Michael Balfour as reporter (uncredited)
- Harry Towb as reporter (uncredited)

== Critical reception ==
The Monthly Film Bulletin wrote: "Although this melodrama is, on the whole, exciting and moves fairly quickly from one situation to another, there are certain scenes, such as some in the deserted theatre, when the pace slows down and tension is lost. The acting is competent and the settings convincing, although the people themselves are not."

Kine Weekly wrote: "The picture, even though its backgrounds are somewhat limited, smoothly mixes homely domestic sentiment and comedy with exuberant rough stuff, and puts a kick into its conventional chase highlight."

TV Guide wrote that the "Plot moves fast enough to make viewers forget the plot holes."

In British Sound Films: The Studio Years 1928–1959 David Quinlan rated the film as "average", writing: "Speedy if not-too-credible thriller."

Leslie Halliwell said: "Formula thick ear with what now seems the world's most unlikely villain – Sid James."

The Radio Times Guide to Films gave the film 2/5 stars, writing: "Something of an improvement on the usual hokum churned out by low-budget expert John Gilling, this drama lacks any of the menace or desperation with which it would have been saturated by even the most pedestrian Hollywood B-movie director. Yet Sid James gives a solid performance as the vice boss on the run who holds a journalist hostage, and he is well supported by Bonar Colleano as a crusading reporter."
