= Blind Spot (1958 film) =

1958 British film by Peter Maxwell

- DVD cover
- Directed by: Peter Maxwell
- Written by: Robert S. Baker; Kenneth Hayles
- Produced by: Robert S. Baker; Monty Berman
- Starring: Robert MacKenzie; Delphi Lawrence; Gordon Jackson
- Cinematography: Arthur Graham
- Edited by: Jim Connock
- Production company: Butcher's Film Service
- Distributed by: Butcher's Film Service
- Release date: July 1958
- Country: United Kingdom
- Language: English

Blind Spot is a 1958 British drama film directed by Peter Maxwell and starring Robert MacKenzie, Delphi Lawrence, Gordon Jackson, John Le Mesurier, and Michael Caine. It was written by Robert S. Baker and Monty Berman.

== Plot ==
Laid up in a military hospital waiting for an operation, U.S. Army Captain Dan Adams, has lost his sight due to a head injury. While his doctors are waiting for his injury to heal before proceeding, Adams is driven off the base to a party but is dropped off at the wrong address.

Entering the house, he stumbles over a body and startles the killers Rushford and Schrieder. Realising Adams is blind, they knock him out and throw him down a flight of stairs. When Adams revives back in the same hospital, his tale of murder seems implausible, as no evidence of a crime is found, not even the distinctive RAF tie pin he says he found beside the body.

After an operation to regain his sight, Adams finds the tie pin in the lining of his jacket. He sets out to track down the killers, starting with visiting the house he had accidentally been taken to. There he meets June Brent and her father, and learns that the tie pin belonged to June's brother Johnny, who had died in a plane crash a year earlier. Although Mr Brent is antagonistic to any investigation, having suffered a nervous breakdown after Johnny's death, June wants to find out the truth. She introduces Adams to a friend of Johnny's, aircraft mechanic Chalky White, and they start to investigate. Dan becomes even more determined to find the truth when an attempt is made on his life. He begins to suspect that Johnny might have stumbled on a smuggling racket, and perhaps did not die in the crash after all. After another attempt on his life, and June's kidnapping, Adams finally finds the truth about the mysterious death and the smuggling operation.

== Cast ==
- Robert MacKenzie as Captain Dan Adams
- Delphi Lawrence as Yvonne Dubar
- Gordon Jackson as "Chalky" White
- Anne Sharp as June Brent
- John Le Mesurier as Mr. Brent
- George Pastell as Schrieder
- Ernest Clark as F. G. Fielding
- Ronan O'Casey as Rushford
- Michael Caine as Johnny Brent
- John Crawford as doctor
- Andrew Faulds as police Inspector
- Robert Gallico as Lieutenant Kelly
- Prunella Scales as petrol pump attendant (uncredited)
- Arthur Lowe as garage mechanic (uncredited)

== Production ==
Principal location photography for Blind Spot took place at Majestic Hotel, Kensington, London, England. Studio shots were completed at Walton Studios, Walton-on-Thames, Surrey, England.

Blind Spot is a remake of Blackout, a 1950 British crime drama by the same producers, but with a different director.

== Critical reception ==
The Monthly Film Bulletin wrote: "Limp and long-drawn-out, this is a highly improbable thriller. Robert Mackenzie makes Dan an unnecessarily unattractive character, and the rest of the cast are quite unable to overcome a feeble script."

Picturegoer wrote: "Robert Mackenzie sets a brisk pace as the hero and the rest of the players keep up with him. An interesting British thriller."

Picture Show wrote: "Briskly told murder mystery, set against authentic London backgrounds."

In British Sound Films: The Studio Years 1928–1959 David Quinlan rated the film as "average", writing: "Thriller is briskly paced and intriguing, but limply written and acted. A remake of Blackout (1950)."

TV Guide gave Blind Spot one out of four stars, and wrote, "A few good turns, including the final chase, can't pep up a tired script."

The Radio Times rated the film two out of five stars, calling it a "stolid British crime yarn."
