= Michael Ward (actor) =

English character actor (1909–1997)

- Sleeping Car to Trieste (1948)
- Born: George William Everard Yoe Ward; 9 April 1909; Carnmenellis, Cornwall, England
- Died: 8 November 1997 (aged 88); London, England
- Education: Royal Central School of Speech and Drama
- Years active: 1947–1978

Michael Ward (born George William Everard Yoe Ward; 9 April 1909 – 8 November 1997) was an English character actor who appeared in nearly eighty films between 1947 and 1978.

== Early life ==
Ward was born in Carnmenellis in Cornwall, to clergyman William George Henry Ward and his wife Annie (née Dingle). He originally trained and worked as a teacher but then retrained at the Central School of Speech and Drama, and won his first film role in 1947, playing Mr Trafford in Alexander Korda's An Ideal Husband.

== Career ==
In between the years 1947 and 1960, Ward appeared in no fewer than 30 films, making him one of the UK's busiest and most recognisable character actors.

As well as five Carry On films, Ward also appeared in four Norman Wisdom films and six made by the Boulting brothers.

In the early 1960s television started to take over Ward's career, and until his retirement in 1978 he appeared in (amongst many others) The Jack Benny Programme, The Avengers, The Morecambe and Wise Show, Dixon of Dock Green, The Two Ronnies, Armchair Theatre, Rising Damp and Sykes.

After making what would be his last ever screen outing in 1978's Revenge of the Pink Panther, Ward suffered a stroke which forced him to retire. By 1986, he was unable to walk. He died on 8 November 1997 at St Mary's Hospital in London. He was 88. Ward was an extremely complicated character and never really recovered from the death of his mother in the late 60s. He was also gay (openly from the late 1960s) which caused him a lot of problems. Ward was a very sensitive man and needed to be reassured regularly.

== Selected films ==
- An Ideal Husband (1947) – Mr. Tommy Tafford
- Calling Paul Temple (1948) – Passer-by (uncredited)
- Saraband for Dead Lovers (1948) – (uncredited)
- Sleeping Car to Trieste (1948) – Elvin
- Once a Jolly Swagman (1949) – Artist at Chelsea Party (uncredited)
- The Queen of Spades (1949) – Officer in the Gaming Room (uncredited)
- Stop Press Girl (1949) – Hairdressers Manager (uncredited)
- Marry Me! (1949) – Minor Role (uncredited)
- Helter Skelter (1949) – News Reader (uncredited0
- Trottie True (1949) – Pianist at Ball (uncredited)
- High Jinks in Society (1949) – Watkins
- So Long at the Fair (1950) – Pilkington (uncredited)
- What the Butler Saw (1950) – Gerald
- Tony Draws a Horse (1950) – Photographer (uncredited)
- Trio (1950) – Undetermined Secondary Role (uncredited)
- No Trace (1950) – Wigmaker
- Seven Days to Noon (1950) – Cast Member (uncredited)
- Lilli Marlene (1951) – Wintertree
- Pool of London (1951) – Pianist (uncredited)
- The Galloping Major (1951) – Blimpish Character (uncredited)
- Life in Her Hands (1951) – Ralph (uncredited)
- Chelsea Story (1951) – Chris Fawcett
- Cheer the Brave (1951)
- Calling Bulldog Drummond (1951) – (uncredited)
- Appointment with Venus (1951) – Senior Clerk's Assistant
- Tom Brown's Schooldays (1951) – Master
- High Treason (1951) – Music Club Member (uncredited)
- Blind Man's Bluff (1952) – Jewellers Assistant
- Whispering Smith Hits London (1952) – Reception Clerk
- 13 East Street (1952) – Barman
- The Happy Family (1952) – BBC Announcer
- Song of Paris (1952) – Waterson
- The Frightened Man (1952) – Cornelius Hart
- The Tall Headlines (1952) – Dentist
- Emergency Call (1952) – Roberto
- Tread Softly (1952) – Alexander Mayne
- Street Corner (1953) – Jewellery Salesman (uncredited)
- The Fake (1953) – Art Salesman
- Trouble in Store (1953) – Wilbur
- The Love Lottery (1954) – Hotel Receptionist
- Josephine and Men (1955) – Bohemian
- Man of the Moment (1955) – Photographer
- Lost (1956) – Mantilla (uncredited)
- Private's Progress (1956) – Sidney (uncredited)
- Jumping for Joy (1956) – Pertwee (uncredited)
- The Intimate Stranger (1956) – Costume Designer (uncredited)
- Up in the World (1956) – Maurice
- Brothers in Law (1957) – Photographer
- Just My Luck (1957) – Cranley
- Carlton-Browne of the F.O. (1959) – Hotel Manager (uncredited)
- The Ugly Duckling (1959) – Pasco
- I'm All Right Jack (1959) – Reporter
- The Rough and the Smooth (1959) – Headwaiter
- Follow a Star (1959) – Bit Role (uncredited)
- Doctor in Love (1960) – Dr. Flower
- Carry On Regardless (1961) – Photographer
- Mary Had a Little... (1961) – Hunter
- A Pair of Briefs (1962) – Judge's Dresser (uncredited)
- Carry On Cabby (1963) – Man in Tweeds
- Father Came Too! (1963) – Man at Auction
- Carry On Cleo (1964) – Archimedes
- The Big Job (1965) – Undertaker
- Carry On Screaming! (1966) – Mr Vivian
- Where the Bullets Fly (1966) – Michael
- Carry On Don't Lose Your Head (1966) – Henri
- Smashing Time (1967) – Elderly Shop Owner
- Frankenstein and the Monster from Hell (1974) – Transvest
- Man About the House (1974) – Mr. Gideon
- Revenge of the Pink Panther (1978) – Real Estate Agent (final film role)
