= The Siege of Sidney Street =

1960 British film by Robert S. Baker and Monty Berman

- Theatrical release poster
- Directed by: Robert S. Baker; Monty Berman
- Written by: Alexander Baron; Jimmy Sangster
- Starring: Donald Sinden; Nicole Berger; Kieron Moore; Peter Wyngarde
- Cinematography: Robert S. Baker; Monty Berman
- Edited by: Peter Bezencenet
- Music by: Stanley Black
- Production company: Mid Century Film Productions
- Distributed by: Regal Films International
- Release date: 11 October 1960
- Running time: 93 minutes
- Country: United Kingdom
- Language: English

The Siege of Sidney Street, also known as The Siege of Hell Street, is a 1960 British historical drama film co-directed by Robert S. Baker and Monty Berman, and starring Donald Sinden, Nicole Berger, Kieron Moore and Peter Wyngarde. It was written by Alexander Barron and Jimmy Sangster.

== Plot ==
The film dramatises the 1909 Tottenham Outrage – a bungled wages-snatch which resulted in the murder of a police officer and a ten-year-old bystander as well as the deaths of the two armed robbers – and the 1911 Siege of Sidney Street, in which armed personnel of the Metropolitan Police and Scots Guards surrounded a house in East End of London occupied by a gang who had killed three City of London Police officers during a bungled attempt to break into a jeweller's shop. The film depicts the two events as both taking place in 1911 and as both being the work of the same gang.

== Cast ==
- Donald Sinden as Mannering
- Nicole Berger as Sara
- Kieron Moore as Toska
- Peter Wyngarde as Peter
- Godfrey Quigley as Blakey
- Leonard Sachs as Svaars
- Tutte Lemkow as Dmitrieff
- Bart Bastable as Sergeant Tucker
- George Pastell as Brodsky
- Angela Newman as Nina
- T. P. McKenna as Lapidos
- Maurice Good as Gardstein
- James Caffrey as Hefeld
- Harold Goldblatt as Hersh
- Christopher Casson as Police Commissioner
- Harry Brogan as Old Harry
- Alan Simpson as Uniformed Police Inspector
- Jimmy Sangster as Winston Churchill (uncredited cameo)

== Production ==
It was filmed at Ardmore Studios in Ireland, with shots of Dublin standing in for pre-First World War East London.

Donald Sinden, then a contract star for the Rank Organisation at Pinewood Studios, recalled

The scene in the blazing room we filmed in the studio and I was vastly intrigued to watch the way the special effects department created the illusion. They began by making everything on set completely fireproof. They then spread an inflammable jelly over the sections that were seen to be burning and just before "Action" it was set alight. Tables and chairs and curtains blazed away and at the end of the scene the flames were extinguished ready for the next Take. It was remarkable. Nothing was damaged. Leonard Sachs, playing Svaars (uncredited) was left in the room with the revolver; his clothes had also been fireproofed and in the long-shot flames licked from the jelly which had been put on his back. For the next shot, his close-up, he was having the jelly placed strategically on his shoulders and arms. I was talking to someone in the crew when another of the crew approached and whispered to his colleague 'Have they fireproofed his hair?' 'No, I don't think they have. It would take 20-minutes.' I was later informed that had Leonard suffered any damage, the insurance company would have paid up, but twenty minutes of the crew's time, on an hourly rate, merely to fireproof an actor's hair would have had to have been paid for by the film company. Thankfully Leonard only suffered mild burns to his hair and scalp!"

== Critical reception ==
The Monthly Film Bulletin wrote: "The anarchist outrages are shown more or less as they happened, with scenes reconstructed from old newspaper photographs and a convincing-looking Winston Churchill (Jimmy Sangster) superintending the final battle as Home Secretary. But instead of sticking to the facts, which were astonishing enough, the film is spiced with the pseudo-thrills of a novelettish romance – attempted rape, pastiche Russian music and a glut of melodramatic clichés. To make matters worse, the characterisation is glib, important incidents are presented obscurely and banal dialogue over-emphatically delivered."

Variety wrote: "Better than average crime thriller based on authentic London gangster crime. ... The Jimmy Sangster-Alexander Baron screenplay is sound and keeps tension to a high level, while offering the directors a splendid chance of bringing some dramatic vitality to the final siege."
