= The Greed of William Hart =

1948 film by Oswald Mitchell

- Theatrical Poster
- Directed by: Oswald Mitchell
- Written by: John Gilling
- Produced by: Gilbert Church
- Starring: Tod Slaughter; Henry Oscar; Jenny Lynn; Aubrey Woods
- Cinematography: D.P. Cooper; S.D. Onions
- Edited by: John F. House
- Production company: Bushey Studios
- Distributed by: Ambassador Film Productions
- Release date: March 1948
- Running time: 80 minutes
- Country: United Kingdom
- Language: English

The Greed of William Hart is a 1948 British horror film directed by Oswald Mitchell and starring Tod Slaughter, Henry Oscar and Aubrey Woods. The film depicts two Edinburgh bodysnatchers closely modelled on the real Burke and Hare.

== Plot ==
In 1828 Edinburgh, Scotland, two Irish immigrants, Mr. Hart and Mr. Moore, take up murdering the locals and selling their bodies to the local medical school, which needs fresh bodies for anatomy lectures and demonstrations. When a young woman, Mary Patterson, goes missing, recently qualified medic Hugh Alston, just returned from his first voyage as a ship's doctor, is alerted by Daft Jamie and Janet that Mary has been taken by a man to Gibb's Close. Jamie says the resurrectionists live there.

Alston suspects that Hart and Moore are involved in foul play, but the arrogant, amoral Dr. Cox - the main buyer for the bodies - attempts to hinder his investigation. Meanwhile, the murderous duo set their sights on eccentric local boy "Daft Jamie" and an old woman.

== Cast ==
- Tod Slaughter as William Hart
- Henry Oscar as Mr Moore
- Jenny Lynn as Helen Moore
- Winifred Melville as Meg Hart
- Aubrey Woods as Daft Jamie Wilson
- Patrick Addison as Hugh Alston
- Arnold Bell as Dr. Cox
- Mary Love as Mary Patterson
- Ann Trego as Janet Brown
- Edward Malin as David Patterson
- Hubert Woodward as innkeeper Swanson
- Dennis Wyndham as Sergeant Fisher

== Production ==
The film was originally made as a fairly direct historical adaptation of the Burke and Hare murders. The British Board of Film Censors, however, insisted that all references to the real-life murderers be removed. The film was then re-titled and re-dubbed with different character names, substituting "Hart" and "Moore" for Hare and Burke, respectively, and "Dr. Cox" for Dr. Knox. All other names, including victims Mary Patterson, Mrs. Docherty, and "Daft Jamie" Wilson, remain unchanged.

Writer John Gilling would go on to script another version of the same story in 1960, titled The Flesh and the Fiends. This version used the correct names for the killers.

The film was made at Bushey Studios.

== Distribution ==
The film was distributed in the United States by J.H. Hoffberg Productions in 1953, slightly edited, as Horror Maniacs.

== Reception ==
Kine Weekly wrote: "The picture, obviously based on the mean and loathsome crimes of Burke and Hare, the notorious Edinburgh bodysnatchers and murderers, is not a burlesque. Unfolded against convincing and colourful low-life settings, it builds up exciting Grand Guignol a through the skilful interplay of its accurately drawn and menacing central characters. There is a slight romantic interest, but it is its studied heartlessness, not its heartthrobs, that puts it in reach of big money. Properly exploited, and there is ample material, it should ring the box-office bell. The star's name has never failed yet on the industrial poster."

The Daily Film Renter wrote: "Murder, lust and avarice in the Tod Slaughter manner. Story of the early 19th century, when the need for medical specimens id brought Resurrectionists into business. Two of the most unscrupulous do well until overconfidence brings about their undoing. Sordid theme lightened by welcome touches of humour. British Quota feature of thick-ear style."

== See also ==
- The Flesh and the Fiends (1960)
- Burke & Hare (1971)
- The Doctor and the Devils (1985)
- Burke & Hare (Comedy, 2010)
