= Chelsea Story =

1951 film by Charles Saunders

- Directed by: Charles Saunders
- Written by: John Gilling
- Produced by: Charles Reynolds; Derek Wynne
- Starring: Henry Mollison; Sydney Tafler; Ingeborg von Kusserow
- Cinematography: Edward Lloyd
- Edited by: Marjorie Saunders
- Music by: Arthur Wilkinson
- Production company: Present Day Productions Ltd.
- Release date: 1951
- Running time: 65 minutes
- Country: United Kingdom
- Language: English

Chelsea Story is a 1951 British second feature ('B') crime film directed by Charles Saunders and starring Henry Mollison, Sydney Tafler and Ingeborg von Kusserow. It was written by John Gilling.

== Plot ==
Fletcher Gilchrist offers £100 to anyone who will break into a house. Journalist Mike Harvey accepts the bet but he and another man are caught when the latter murders the owner of the house. Harvey escapes custody, determined to seek revenge on Gilchrist.

== Cast ==
- Henry Mollison as Mike Harvey
- Sydney Tafler as Fletcher Gilchrist
- Ingeborg von Kusserow as Janice (as Ingeborg Wells)
- Lesley Osmond as Louise
- Michael Moore as George
- Wallas Eaton as Danny
- Laurence Naismith as Sergeant Matthews
- Michael Ward as Chris Fawcett

== Reception ==
The Monthly Film Bulletin wrote: "Unconvincing thriller."

Kine Weekly wrote: "The film does not aim high, but it gets around and ends on a tense note. Sidney Tafler, as the evil Fletcher, hasn't the biggest part, but he is easily the most impressive of the cast. He really makes his presence felt and holds the drama together. Authentic backgrounds effectively round off colourful tabloid thick ear."

Picture Show wrote: "Rather far-fetched but quite thrilling melodrama .... Authentic settings help along its reality."

Chibnall and McFarlane in The British 'B' Film call it "a talky noir melodrama."
