= Marjorie Saunders =

British film editor

Marjorie Saunders (1916–1983) was a British film editor.

== Selected filmography ==
- Brief Encounter (1945, associate editor)
- They Made Me a Fugitive (1947)
- The First Gentleman (1948)
- For Them That Trespass (1949)
- One Wild Oat (1951)
- Chelsea Story (1951)
- Come Back Peter (1952)
- Three Steps to the Gallows (1953)
- Double Exposure (1954)
- The Hornet's Nest (1955)
- The Narrowing Circle (1956)
- Behind the Headlines (1956)
