= The Challenge (1960 film) =

1960 British film by John Gilling

- Directed by: John Gilling
- Written by: John Gilling
- Produced by: John Temple-Smith
- Starring: Jayne Mansfield and Anthony Quayle
- Cinematography: Gordon Dines
- Edited by: Alan Osbiston and John Victor-Smith
- Music by: Bill McGuffie
- Production company: Alexandra
- Distributed by: J. Arthur Rank Film Distributors (UK)
- Release date: 17 May 1960
- Running time: 101 minutes
- Country: United Kingdom
- Language: English

The Challenge (U.S. title: It Takes a Thief), is a 1960 British crime film directed and written by John Gilling and starring Jayne Mansfield and Anthony Quayle.

== Plot ==
Billy Lacross is a ruthless gang leader who persuades Jim Maxton to take part in a big robbery. Maxton is shopped and convicted of the robbery. He serves his time, and returns home to his son. The gang want the money he buried but Maxton wants nothing more to do with it or them. The gang then kidnap Maxton's son and demand the money as ransom. There follows a race against time to save Maxton's son.

== Cast ==
- Jayne Mansfield as Billy Lacross
- Anthony Quayle as Jim Maxton
- Carl Möhner as Kristy
- Peter Reynolds as Buddy
- Barbara Mullen as Ma Piper
- Robert Brown as Bob Crowther
- Dermot Walsh as Detective Sergeant Willis
- Patrick Holt as Max
- Edward Judd as Detective Sergeant Gittens
- John Bennett as Spider
- Lorraine Clewes as Mrs. Rick
- Percy Herbert as shop steward
- John Stratton as Rick
- Liane Marelli as striptease artiste
- Bill McGuffie as nightclub pianist
- Peter Pike as Joey
- Lloyd Lamble as Dr.Westerly
- Victor Brooks as foreman
- John Wood as school inspector

== Production ==
Mansfield made the film in England immediately after Too Hot to Handle. "I want a chance to prove myself in strong, dramatic roles," she said.

The film was shot in England from 12 October to around December 1959. Mansfield flew back to America on the 16th, after she finished filming.

== Critical reception ==
The Monthly Film Bulletin wrote: "This British excursion into violent crime owes something to an old Edward G. Robinson film, The Last Gangster [1937], but still makes very little impact. There are few thrills, and those of a mostly unpleasant nature, and the pace is sluggish and erratic. Admittedly the sight of Jayne Mansfield as the brains of a gang of thieves, doing the books by day in horn-rims and a black wig, slinking about in sequins by night and entertaining her guests with little songs, provides at least one good laugh. Otherwise the plot is a routine matter of assault and battery, police bafflement and small child appeal, its detail loosely contrived with some careless railway observation and no satisfactory explanation why the gang made a "fall guy" out of Jim."

Variety wrote: The Challenge suffers because it doesn't gather momentum fast enough and the story line is spasmodic and loosely contrived. Only Quayle, of the principal characters, emerges as much more than a cardboard figure and he gives a good performance of stolid determination and fear. Miss Mansfield does little for her role though she seems happier in the later sequences than as the tough gang leader. ... John V. Smith's editing is often jerky and John Gilling has directed his own screenplay soundly but sluggishly at first and with insufficient thrills."

Filmink argued Mansfield's part was "probably better suited to Diana Dors."

TV Guide wrote, "most of the actors, with the exception of Quayle, are pretty stiff, and the story is hardly inspired."

Sky Movies noted, "filled with such familiar leading men of British 'B' features as Peter Reynolds, Edward Judd, Dermot Walsh and Patrick Holt. Some of the best moments, though, are provided by Hollywood's Jayne Mansfield as the criminal mastermind, demure in black wig and horn-rimmed glasses as she does her 'firm's' books by day, but slinking around in sequins by night with a smile and a song."
