= Garard Green =

British actor and commentator (1924–2004)

- Born: 31 July 1924; Madras, India
- Died: 26 December 2004 (aged 80); London, England
- Occupation: Actor
- Years active: 1954–1998
- Spouse: Margaret Tansley

Garard Green (31 July 1924 – 26 December 2004) was a British actor and commentator.

Green was born in Madras, India in 1924 where his father was superintendent of the government press. When his father died in 1933 the family returned to the United Kingdom and Green finished his education at Watford Grammar School. He developed an interest in acting at Watford but when he left the school he returned to India and the Military Academy and was commissioned into the 2nd King Edward VII's Own Gurkha Rifles (The Sirmoor Rifles).

At the end of the war he was demobilised and won a Sir Alexander Korda scholarship to Royal Academy of Dramatic Art (RADA). On leaving RADA he worked in the theatre in London. In 1953 he married the actress Margaret Tansley. He developed mobility problems caused by severe arthritis which ended his stage career and he concentrated on films and television, appearing in over 40 films including Hour of Decision (1957), Horrors of the Black Museum (1959) and The Hand (1960).

As well as numerous BBC radio productions where his talent for voices was in demand, Green recorded nearly 250 audio-books, many for the Royal National Institute for the Blind. In 1992 Green compered and narrated a TV spectacular: Forty Glorious Years to mark the 40th anniversary of Queen Elizabeth II's accession.

Green died on Boxing Day 2004 aged 80.

== Filmography ==
- Profile (1954)
- High Terrace (1956)
- Morning Call (1957)
- Hour of Decision (1957)
- The Steel Bayonet (1957)
- Crash Drive (1959)
- Horrors of the Black Museum (1959)
- The Flesh and the Fiends (1960)
- The Hand (1960)
- Compelled (1960)
- Sentenced for Life (1960)
- Jackpot (1960 film) (1960)
- Three Spare Wives (1962)
- The Spanish Sword (1962)
- The £20,000 Kiss (1962)
- Emergency (1962)
- A Matter of Choice (1963)

== Sources ==
- Noble, Peter, ed. (1982). 1982–1983 Screen International Film And TV Year Book. London: King Publications.
