= C. M. Pennington-Richards =

British film director and cinematographer (1911–2005)

- Born: Cyril Montague Pennington-Richards; 17 December 1911; South Norwood, London, England
- Died: 2 January 2005 (aged 93); Chichester, West Sussex, England
- Years active: 1946–1977

Cyril Montague Pennington-Richards (17 December 1911 – 2 January 2005) was a British film director and cinematographer.

== Selected filmography ==
Cinematographer

- Builders (1942)
- Theirs Is the Glory (1946)
- All Over the Town (1949)
- Obsession (1949)
- Give Us This Day (1949)
- The Wooden Horse (1950)
- White Corridors (1951)
- Scrooge (1951)
- Something Money Can't Buy (1952)
- Always a Bride (1953)
- Forbidden Cargo (1954)
- 1984 (1956)
- It's Never Too Late (1956)
- Tarzan and the Lost Safari (1957)

Director

- The Oracle (1953)
- Hour of Decision (1957)
- Stormy Crossing (1958)
- Inn for Trouble (1960)
- Double Bunk (1961)
- Dentist on the Job (1961)
- Ladies Who Do (1963)
- Mystery Submarine (1963)
- A Challenge for Robin Hood (1967)
- Danny the Dragon (1967)
- Sky Pirates (1977)
