= The Hand (1960 film) =

1960 British film by Henry Cass

- U.S. theatrical poster
- Directed by: Henry Cass
- Written by: Ray Cooney; Tony Hilton
- Produced by: Bill Luckwell
- Starring: Derek Bond; Reed De Rouen; Bryan Coleman
- Cinematography: Walter J. Harvey
- Edited by: Robert Jordan Hill
- Music by: Wilfred Burns
- Production company: Walton Studios
- Distributed by: Butcher's Film Service
- Release date: October 1960
- Running time: 61 minutes
- Country: United Kingdom
- Language: English

The Hand is a 1960 British horror film directed by Henry Cass and starring Derek Bond and Ronald Leigh-Hunt. It was written by Ray Cooney and Tony Hilton.

== Plot ==
The story begins during the Burma campaign (mislabelled as '1946'), in which three captured British soldiers are threatened with torture if they refuse to divulge military information. Two refuse and have their hands chopped off.

Some time later, in post-War London, a gentleman of the night is found with his hand surgically removed and £500 in his pockets. This begins a criminal investigation, returning the plot to the opening situation.

== Cast ==
- Derek Bond as Roberts / Roger Crawshaw
- Ronald Leigh-Hunt as Inspector Munyard
- Ray Cooney as Sgt. David Pollitt
- Reed De Rouen as Michael John Brodie
- Bryan Coleman as George Adams
- Walter Randall as Japanese commander
- Tony Hilton as Police Sgt. Paul Foster
- Harold Scott as Charlie Taplow
- Gwenda Ewen as Nurse Johns
- Michael Moore as Dr. Metcalfe
- Ronald Wilson as Doctor
- Garard Green as Dr. Simon Crawshaw
- Jean Dallas as Nurse Geiber
- David Blake Kelly as Jay Marshall
- Reginald Hearne as Noel Brodie
- Madeleine Burgess as Mrs. Brodie

== Critical reception ==
The Monthly Film Bulletin wrote: "This is a grisly mystery thriller of no great interest or authority, wordy, confused and only too slow."

Britmovie wrote, "this Ray Cooney scripted post-war revenge thriller opens promisingly enough but soon all tension and mystery is lost due to the predictable plot development and clumsy editing".

Unseen Films wrote, "this is a neat little film that never fully makes 100% sense...I liked this movie a great deal. It's far from perfect, but it does hold your attention."
