= Panic (1963 film) =

British film by Norman Harrison

- British theatrical poster
- Directed by: John Gilling
- Screenplay by: John Gilling
- Based on: a story by John Gilling; Guido Coen
- Produced by: Guido Coen
- Cinematography: Geoffrey Faithfull
- Edited by: William Lewthwaite
- Production company: Ingram Films
- Distributed by: Bryanston Films (UK)
- Release date: 1963 (UK)
- Running time: 69 min
- Country: United Kingdom
- Language: English

Panic is a 1963 British 'B' crime film directed by John Gilling and starring Dyson Lovell, Janine Gray and Glyn Houston. The screenplay was by Gilling from a story by Gilling and Guido Coen.

A young Swiss woman loses her memory and becomes mixed up with a gang of diamond thieves, one of whom is her boyfriend.

== Plot ==
Janine Heinig lives with her jazz trumpeter boyfriend Johnnie Cobb. Unknown to her, Johnnie is a member of a criminal gang and has obtained a letter from her boss, diamond dealer Mr Jessop, which was given to Janine for posting. It states that two German businessmen will be calling at his office to collect a priceless diamond. Gang members Ben and Tom impersonate the Germans and as they force Jessop to hand over the diamond, he tries to raise the alarm and they shoot him.

Janine is knocked unconscious and awakes with total amnesia. She wanders the streets and rents a seedy room. The police are seeking Janine and her picture is in the newspapers. She takes refuge in a café and meets Mike, a kind-hearted sailor and ex-boxer. Mike falls in love with her and wants to get her out of the country via his shipping contacts. To raise the money he goes back to the boxing ring. Meanwhile Johnnie is on the trail of Janine and Mike, intending to silence them both. After the fight, Johnnie attacks Mike. Janine arrives and shoots Johnnie.

== Cast ==
- Janine Gray as Janine Heinig
- Glyn Houston as Mike Connor
- Dyson Lovell as Johnnie Cobb
- Duncan Lamont as Inspector Saunders
- Stanley Meadows as Tom
- Brian Weske as Ben
- Charles Houston as Louis Cobb
- Philip Ray as Jessop
- Marne Maitland as Lantern
- John Horsley as Inspector Malcolm
- Leonard Sachs as Len Collier
- Colin Rix as Detective Sergeant Rose
- Dermot Kelly as Murphy
- Sean Lynch as layabout in café
- Julie Mendez as Lucette
- Duncan Lewis as Joe
- Jeremy Hawk as Spike
- Paul Carpenter as Frank Penrose (commentator)
- Vic Wise as Benny
- Garry Davis as Bobby Shark
- Manning Wilson as policeman

== Critical reception ==
The Monthly Film Bulletin wrote: "Dim second feature, flatly scripted and indifferently acted. A great deal of the footage seems to be devoted to the heroine's amnesiac mooning."

Kine Weekly wrote: "This is a slow and rather corny tale, but it has its moments of entertainment. ... The picture has a curiously unimportant air about it. The characters never come to life and the ration of incident is sparse, though a couple of fights carry some impact. Janine Gray does her pretty best with a role that requires her to wear a puzzled, lost memory look for much of the time"

TV Guide called it "A hollow crime melodrama."

The Dark Side called it "an atmospheric British noir."
