= Michael Evans (actor) =

English actor (1920–2007)

Michael Evans

John Michael Evans (27 July 1920 – 4 September 2007) was an English actor best known for starring in the original 1951 Broadway production of Gigi with Audrey Hepburn, and later as Colonel Douglas Austin on the American soap opera The Young and the Restless.

== Biography ==
Evans was born on 27 July 1920 in Sittingbourne, Kent; to John Evans, a cricketer and First World War Royal Flying Corps pilot and double prisoner-of-war escapee who wrote the 1926 novel, The Escaping Club, and his wife, the former Marie Galbraith, an Irish concert violinist. Evans later told the Toronto Star in a 1992 interview on his return to "My Fair Lady" touring Russia, that aged 12, he decided to be an actor after seeing Sir John Gielgud on stage in "Richard II".

During the Second World War he was a Royal Air Force navigator, and flew during the Blitz. He returned to Winchester College and graduated in 1943, and then studied acting with the Old Vic company, with whom he made his stage debut in London's West End theatre in 1948 as a member of the Old Vic company.

Evans then moved to the United States, making his New York debut in the Broadway theatre production of "Ring Round the Moon". Evans then played opposite a young Audrey Hepburn in "Gigi" in 1951. He then took on the role of Henry Higgins in a touring production of My Fair Lady. Evans returned to Broadway in Mary, Mary and made the move to Hollywood when he took a role in Bye Bye Birdie (1963). While in Hollywood, he took on many guest starring roles in shows such as: The Man from U.N.C.L.E., Combat!, Perry Mason and his best known television role as Colonel Douglas Austin on The Young and the Restless. In the early '80s he played Britain's greatest detective, "Sherlock Holmes" in "Sherlock and Me".

=== Personal life ===
In 1948, Evans married Pat Wedgewood. The couple had two sons (Nick and Christopher), and divorced in 1983. His second wife, Pat Sigris Evans, died in 1995, with whom he had no children.

Evans died in a Woodland Hills assisted-living facility on 4 September 2007, of complications related to age. He was buried in Forest Lawn – Hollywood Hills Cemetery.

== Select filmography ==
Year	Title	Role	Notes
1950	Blackout	Guy Sinclair	
1951	The Six Men	Hunter	
1951	Appointment with Venus	2nd Officer - Com.Ops	
1963	Bye Bye Birdie	Claude Paisley	
1965	Combat!	Maj Cole-Hughes	S04 E13 - Luck with Rainbows
1966	The Plainsman	Estrick	
1967	Riot on Sunset Strip	Frank Tweedy	
1967	The Rat Patrol	Col Windsor	S01 E20, The Last Chance Raid
1967	The Love-Ins	Rev. Spencer	
1969	The Thousand Plane Raid	Group Commander Leslie Hardwicke	
1974	Oliver Twist	N/A	Voice role
1979	Time After Time	Sergeant	
1982	The Sword and the Sorcerer	King Ludwig	
1983	Olivia	Chairman	
