= La cruz del diablo =

1975 film

- Directed by: John Gilling
- Screenplay by: Paul Naschy; Juan Jose Porto
- Based on: "La cruz del diablo" "El monte de las animas" "Maese Perez, organista" by Gustavo Adolfo Becquer
- Produced by: Quique Herrera Jr.
- Starring: Carmen Sevilla; Adolfo Marsillach; Eduardo Fajardo; Emma Cohen; Ramiro Oliveros; Mónica Randall
- Cinematography: Fernando Arribas
- Edited by: Alfonso Santacana
- Music by: Ángel Arteaga
- Production company: Bulmes S.A.
- Distributed by: United International Pictures
- Release date: March 29, 1975 (Spain)
- Country: Spain
- Language: Spanish

La cruz del diablo (English: "The Devil's Cross") is a 1974 Spanish horror film directed by John Gilling from a screenplay by Paul Naschy and Juan Jose Porto, and starring Carmen Sevilla, Adolfo Marsillach, Ramiro Oliveros and Emma Cohen. The film is based on three short stories written by Gustavo Adolfo Bécquer. Its plot concerns a British writer who travels to Spain to visit his sister, only to discover she has been murdered by a satanic cult.

The film was only released theatrically in Spain in March 1975, and was never dubbed in English nor shown outside of Spain. It was Gilling's final film before his death in 1984.

== Plot ==
A cannabis-smoking British writer, Alfred Dawson, has been suffering from vivid nightmares. The subjects of the recurring nightmares are a marauding cult of undead medieval Knights Templars on horseback tormenting a woman in white, who cries for help. He is unsure whether the dreams are caused by the drugs, or are some sort of vision. Alfred's sister Justine, fearing she is in danger, asks him to visit her in Spain, where she lives with her wealthy Spanish husband. However, when Alfred arrives, he discovers that she has been murdered. He vows to find the murderer, even as it leads him and his companions to the fearful region of the Devil's Cross and the ruins of the Templars' castle.

== Cast ==
- Carmen Sevilla as Maria
- Adolfo Marsillach as Cesar del Rio
- Emma Cohen as Beatriz
- Ramiro Oliveros as Alfred Dawson
- Eduardo Fajardo as Enrique Carrillo
- Mónica Randall as Justine Carrillo
- Tony Isbert as Iñigo de Ataíde
- Fernando Sancho as Ignacio
- Silvia Vivó as Ines
- Eduardo Calvo as Prison Director
- Pascual Hernández as Police Officer
- Antonio Ramis as Criado

== Production ==
La cruz del diablo was the final film by veteran British horror director John Gilling, best known for his work at Hammer Films. Gilling had left Hammer in 1967 and subsequently retired to Spain, but was convinced by the producers to come out of retirement. Shooting took place in Escalona and Madrid.

The screenplay, written by Paul Naschy, was based on three short stories written by Gustavo Adolfo Bécquer: La cruz del diablo, El monte de las animas and Maese Perez, organista. Naschy wrote the script with the intention of playing the lead role in the film.

Thinking it would help his chances of getting the film made, Naschy turned financial control over to Juan Jose Porto, whom Naschy considered a trusted friend, who (according to Naschy) betrayed that trust and cut Naschy out of the project altogether by selling Naschy's script to a producer named Quique Herreros Jr. without Naschy's knowledge and then rewriting much of the story. To compound the problem, director John Gilling decided not to use Naschy in the lead role, since he didn't think much of Naschy's acting abilities. They went ahead with filming the project in September 1974 without even notifying Naschy that it had been greenlighted. Naschy sued and won a very small token settlement and a screenwriting credit which he didn't want any more because he felt they had totally ruined his script with all the changes that were made. The whole incident remained a major sore point with Naschy for the rest of his life.

== Release ==
The film was only released theatrically in Spain in March 1975, and was never dubbed in English nor shown outside of Spain. The Knights Templar in the film bring to mind the then-popular "Blind Dead" films of Amando de Ossorio, whose fourth film in the series Night of the Seagulls was released soon after La cruz del diablo.

== Reception ==
Writing in The Zombie Movie Encyclopedia, academic Peter Dendle called it "a disappointing final film for ex-Hammer Studios director John Gilling". Glenn Kay, who wrote Zombie Movies: The Ultimate Guide, described it as an out of print film that is considered "uninspired and unimpressive" by those who have seen it.

== Availability ==
For years, La cruz del diablo was thought to be a lost film, but a decade later, it turned up on Spanish TV and then mid-grade quality copies started popping up on gray market video. The film is available today on DVD only in Spanish with English subtitles.
