= John Horsley (actor) =

English actor (1920–2014)

- Born: John Lovell Horsley; 21 July 1920; Westcliff-on-Sea, Essex, England
- Died: 12 January 2014 (aged 93); Northwood, Middlesex, England
- Occupation: Actor
- Years active: 1950–1997
- Spouse: June Marshall (m. 1948; died 1988)
- Children: 2

John Lovell Horsley (21 July 1920 – 12 January 2014) was an English actor.

== Early life ==
Horsley was born in Westcliff-on-Sea, Essex, England. The son of a doctor, he made his acting debut at the Theatre Royal in Bournemouth. After appearing in repertory theatres he was called up for military service in the Royal Devon Yeomanry, in which he served in Sicily and Italy during the Second World War. He then contracted hepatitis and become a member of an Army drama company that toured military units.

== Career ==
Horsley's early career as a professional actor saw him playing a succession of doctors and policemen, including a doctor in the film Hell Drivers (1957) and a policeman in the television show Big Breadwinner Hog (1969). Between 1957-'59, he played Superintendent Whitelaw, in Shadow Squad. He was more prolific in television from the 1960s, and played character roles in many series and programmes including The Lotus Eaters (1972–73) and The Duchess of Duke Street (1976–77). He is best known for his role as Doc Morrissey in the BBC sitcom The Fall and Rise of Reginald Perrin (1976–79), in which his catchphrase was "Take two aspirins." He reprised the role in The Legacy of Reginald Perrin in 1996. He also starred in the 1980s comedy series My Husband and I.

Horsley played Giles Rowley in "The Colonel's Lady" (1988), an episode of Tales of the Unexpected. He played Sir Ralph Shawcross in the BBC sitcom You Rang, M'Lord? (1990–93) and the Bishop of Tatchester in the BBC's adaptation of John Masefield's The Box of Delights (1984). He appeared as Professor Wanstead in Nemesis, an episode of Miss Marple, in 1987, and as Edward Tressilian in Hercule Poirot's Christmas, an episode of Agatha Christie's Poirot, in 1995. He also appeared as Clive in "Co-respondents Course", an episode of the sitcom Hi-de-Hi!. His final role was in the TV mini-series Rebecca in 1997.

== Personal life ==
Horsley was married to the actress June Marshall (1923–1988) from 1948 until her death, and they had two daughters.

Horsley died on 12 January 2014 at Denville Hall, a retirement home for actors.

== Selected filmography ==
- Highly Dangerous (1950) – Customs officer
- Blackmailed (1951) – Maggie's doctor
- The Quiet Woman (1951) – Inspector Bromley
- Appointment with Venus (1951) – Naval Officer Kent
- Encore (1951) – Joe, Mate (segment "Winter Cruise")
- The Frightened Man (1952) – Harry Armstrong
- The Lost Hours (1952) – Brown
- The Long Memory (1953) – Bletchley
- Time Bomb (1953) – Constable Charles Baron
- Deadly Nightshade (1953) – Inspector Clements
- Sailor of the King (1953) – Commander John Willis
- Wheel of Fate (1953) – Detective Sergeant Simpson
- Recoil (1953) – Inspector Trubridge
- Personal Affair (1953) – Parson (uncredited)
- Meet Mr. Malcolm (1954) – Tony Barlow
- Impulse (1954) – Police officer
- The Maggie (1954) – Man in office (uncredited)
- The Runaway Bus (1954) – Inspector Henley
- Double Exposure (1954) – Lamport
- Night People (1954) – Lieutenant Colonel Stanways
- Forbidden Cargo (1954) – Customs officer (uncredited)
- Father Brown (1954) – Inspector Wilkins
- Delayed Action (1954) – Worsley
- Seagulls Over Sorrento (1954) – John Phillips – doctor / surgeon (uncredited)
- Up to His Neck (1954) – Navigating officer (uncredited)
- Mad About Men (1954) – Sports organiser (uncredited)
- The Brain Machine (1955) – Dr Richards
- Above Us the Waves (1955) – Lieutenant Anderson
- Little Red Monkey (1955) – Det. Sgt Gibson
- Barbados Quest (1955) – Det. Insp. Taylor
- They Can't Hang Me (1955) – Assistant Commissioner
- A Time to Kill (1955) – Peter Hastings
- Bond of Fear (1956) – Motorcycle policeman
- Breakaway (1956) – Michael Matlock
- The Weapon (1956) – Johnson
- Circus Friends (1956) – Bert Marlow
- Yangtse Incident: The Story of H.M.S. Amethyst (1957) – Chief staff officer
- Stranger in Town (1957) – Inspector Powell
- Hell Drivers (1957) – Doctor attending Gino
- Man in the Shadow (1957) – Alan Peters
- Barnacle Bill (1957) – First surgeon
- Dunkirk (1958) – Padre
- Stormy Crossing (1958) – Detective Inspector Parry
- Operation Amsterdam (1959) – Commander Bowerman
- Ben-Hur (1959) – Spintho (uncredited)
- A Touch of Larceny (1959) – First editor (uncredited)
- Wrong Number (1959) – Superintendent Blake
- Sink the Bismarck! (1960) – Captain (Sheffield)
- Seven Keys (1961) – Police sergeant (opening scene)
- The Secret Ways (1961) – Jon Brainbridge
- The Sinister Man (Edgar Wallace Mysteries) (1961) – Pathologist
- Serena (1962) – Mr Fisher
- Jigsaw (1962) – Superintendent Ramsey (uncredited)
- Night of the Prowler (1962) – Detective Inspector Cameron
- Return to Sender (1963) – Superintendent Gilchrist
- Panic (1963) – Inspector Malcolm
- The Comedy Man (1964) – Co-pilot (uncredited)
- Where the Bullets Fly (1966) – Air Marshal
- The Limbo Line (1968) – Richards
- Lady Killers (1980) - Rigby Swift
- The Funny Side of Christmas (1982) – Doc Morrissey
- Secrets (1983) – Dr Jefferies
- The Doctor and the Devils (1985) – Dr Mackendrick
- The Fourth Protocol (1987) – Sir Anthony Plumb
- Stanley's Dragon (1994) – Mr Little
