= Whispering Smith Hits London =

1952 British film directed by Francis Searle

- Poster for US theatrical release
- Directed by: Francis Searle
- Written by: Frank H. Spearman (story)
- Screenplay by: John Gilling; Steve Fisher
- Produced by: Anthony Hinds; Julian Lesser
- Starring: Richard Carlson; Greta Gynt; Rona Anderson; Herbert Lom
- Cinematography: Walter Harvey
- Edited by: James Needs
- Music by: Frank Spencer
- Production company: Hammer Film Productions
- Distributed by: Exclusive Films; RKO Radio Pictures (US)
- Release date: 3 February 1952 (UK)
- Running time: 84 minutes (UK); 77 minutes (US)
- Country: United Kingdom
- Language: English

Whispering Smith Hits London (U.S. title Whispering Smith vs. Scotland Yard) is a 1952 British second feature ('B') crime drama directed by Francis Searle and starring Richard Carlson, Greta Gynt and Herbert Lom. It was written by John Gilling and Steve Fisher from a story by Frank H. Spearman. The original working title for the film was Whispering Smith Investigates, but it was changed to Whispering Smith Hits London just before its trade show. Michael Carreras was working on the script for a sequel to this film, but plans for a series was dropped.

== Plot ==
Whispering Smith, an American detective, is summoned to London to investigate the suicide of a young woman named Sylvia Garde. The dead girl's father and his secretary Anne both suspect that Sylvia was murdered. Smith finds a little black book that indicates that Sylvia's lawyer Hector Reith and her fiance Roger Ford had both been blackmailing Sylvia. Her ex-friend Louise was also in on the plot, and Smith rushes to protect Anne who has been temporarily living with Louise. Smith learns that Sylvia is actually still alive, and that it was her friend Louise who was murdered due to a botched blackmail scheme. Sylvia accidentally shoots and kills her own boyfriend Roger Ford while trying to hold Smith and Anne at gunpoint in the film's finale.

== Cast ==
- Richard Carlson as Steve "Whispering" Smith
- Greta Gynt as Louise Balfour
- Herbert Lom as Roger Ford
- Rona Anderson as Anne Carter
- Alan Wheatley as Hector Reith, the lawyer
- Dora Bryan as Miss La Fosse
- Reginald Beckwith as Manson
- Daniel Wherry as Dr Taren
- Michael Ward as reception clerk
- Danny Green as Cecil Fleming
- James Raglan as Supintendent Meaker
- Stuart Nichol as Martin
- Laurence Naismith as Parker
- Christine Silver as Mrs. Pearson
- Vic Wise as Maxie
- Stanley Baker in small role as reporter
- Middleton Woods
- Michael Hogarth
- John Wynn

== Production ==
The screenplay was by John Gilling and Steve Fisher, based on a story by Frank H. Spearman. Gilling said in interviewsc that he had to sue to get his writer's credit on the film, which infuriated James Carreras who was planning to credit only Spearman. It was made at Bray Studios with some location shooting in London. Production ran from 14 May 1951 to 21 June 1951.

== Release ==
It was trade shown on 17 January 1952 at the Rialto, then released on 3 February. The film was distributed in the US in March 1952 by RKO, in a slightly edited version retitled Whispering Smith vs. Scotland Yard.

== Reception ==
The Monthly Film Bulletin wrote: "A fast-moving and quite exciting thriller, well acted by Richard Carlson, and made with modest competence."

Kine Weekly wrote: "The picture, staged in and around one of England's ancestral mansions, does not take the shortest cut to its happy and exciting ending, but, although some of the digressions add to its footage without strengthening its entertainment content, its principal players make the most of the red herrings. Richard Carlson, as Smith; is both shrewd and affable, and the well-known British co-stars and supporting artists cooperate effectively. The photography, like the settings, is impeccable."

Variety wrote: "A hole or two develops in the script, but overall it proves to be acceptable whodunit framing. Carlson does a likeable job of the private eye, and script finds time to permit him some amatory didoes which are customary to private sleuthing. Miss Gynt as the femme menace, and Miss Anderson as the gal who winds up with Carlson, are okay. Lou and Wheatley do well by their dirty work, and others are capable."

Picturegoer wrote: "Provided you don't expect too much, you'll find it both agreeable and exciting."

In British Sound Films: The Studio Years 1928–1959 David Quinlan rated the film as "average", writing: "Exciting enough crime drama for those who can keep track of the plot."

Leslie Halliwell said: "Tolerable programmer of its time: competence without inspiration."
