= Brian McFarlane (writer) =

Australian writer, film historian, and educator (born 1934)

- Born: Brian Campbell McFarlane; 1934 (age 91–92); Victoria, Australia
- Education: University of Melbourne (BA & DipEd); University of East Anglia (PhD)
- Occupations: Writer; Film historian School teacher University lecturer Film critic
- Writing career
- Years active: 1950s–present
- Genre: Non-fiction
- Subject: Cinema
- Notable works: Oxford Companion to Australian Film; The Encyclopedia of British Film

Brian Campbell McFarlane (born 1934) is an Australian writer, film historian, and educator. He has had three overlapping careers: as a secondary school teacher, a full-time academic, and a writer. Known for co-editing and/or authoring such works as the Oxford Companion to Australian Film, The Encyclopedia of British Film, and The British 'B' film, he is also a film critic and an internationally known expert on British cinema. He spent his final ten years of full-time work at Monash University in Melbourne.

== Early life and education ==
Brian Campbell McFarlane was born in 1934 and grew up in the Wimmera district of Victoria, Australia, before World War II. He saw his first film when he was five years old, and wrote his first film review at the age of ten. His family moved from the village of Lillimur to Nhill, a bigger regional town. Despite the facts that the films were only released there years after their original release in the UK or US, and that his parents were suspicious of movies as corrupting influence, his love of film grew.

Aged 16, he moved to Melbourne to study English and French at university, graduating with a BA and DipEd from the University of Melbourne.

McFarlane completed his MA in Australian literature at Melbourne University, and later undertook his PhD at the University of East Anglia in Norwich, Norfolk, England. His PhD thesis in the field of literary adaptation to film.

== Career ==
=== Teaching: secondary ===
After graduation, McFarlane returned to teach at a secondary school in Terang, also in regional Victoria. He enjoyed considerable success as a high school teacher and administrator, teaching in Australia, England, and the United States. For 15 years before ending his teaching career, he taught at Trinity Grammar School in the Melbourne suburb of Kew. During this period, he won a Fulbright Scholarship to teach at Northwestern Michigan College in Traverse City, Michigan, US.

=== Teaching: tertiary ===
After several periods doing part-time tutoring at the University of Melbourne and La Trobe University while still at Trinity Grammar, McFarlane became a full-time academic. From 2007 until 2009, he was visiting professor at the University of Hull in Kingston upon Hull, East Riding of Yorkshire, England.

He spent his final decade of work in the English department at Monash University, teaching literature and film, with a focus on British cinema and literary adaptations. Sometime before 2011, McFarlane was appointed adjunct associate professor at Monash.

In 2012 McFarlane was appointed adjunct professor at the Swinburne Institute of Social Research, Swinburne University of Technology.

=== Writing ===
McFarlane has authored or edited more than 30 books and hundreds of articles relating to film and literature and associated topics, including co-editing the Oxford Companion to Australian Film, and as chief author and compiler of The Encyclopedia of British Film. He is world-renowned as an authority on British cinema, and on adaptations of literature to film. He has also contributed entries in the Oxford Dictionary of National Biography.

He co-authored The British 'B' film with Steve Chibnall, which at its time of publication (by Palgrave Macmillan in association with the British Film Institute) in 2009, was described by its publishers as "the first book to provide a thorough examination of the British 'B' movie, from the war years to the 1960s". Senses of Cinema called it a "valuable resource book" and a "meticulous book [that] systematically examines the cultural policy, production economics and audience demand for the low-budget British film between 1940 and 1965".

He regularly reviews films and books in The Age, Australian Book Review, Metro, Inside Story, and the online journal Senses of Cinema.

== Other activities ==
McFarlane has served on the editorial boards of various cinema-related journals in Australia, the UK, and the US. He has also been an examiner of PhD theses and book proposals from those countries.

He voted for ten films in the Sight and Sound's "Greatest Films of All Time", which were listed on the British Film Institute website. His top film is Brief Encounter (1945).

== Recognition and honours ==
- 1997: Elected a fellow of the Australian Academy of the Humanities
- 2001: Centenary Medal, "For service to Australian society and the humanities in the study of literature and the arts"
- 2016: Medal of the Order of Australia, "For service to the arts as a teacher, film critic, reviewer and author"

== Personal life ==
McFarlane married Geraldine, and they had three children. He lives in Melbourne.

He was a longtime friend of actress Googie Withers, and upon her death in July 2011, wrote an obituary for her in The Sydney Morning Herald.

== Selected works ==
- Cross-Country : A Book of Australian Verse edited by John Barnes and Brian MacFarlane, Heinemann, 1988
- Oxford Companion to Australian Film (co-editor)
- The Encyclopedia of British Film (compiler, editor, and chief author)
- Real and Reel: The Education of a film obsessive and critic (2011; author; a memoir)
- New Australian Film (co-author, with Geoff Mayer)
- Novel to Film: an Introduction to the Theory of Adaptation (1996)
- An Autobiography of British Cinema: As Told by the Filmmakers and Actors Who Made It (1997)
- The Cinema of Britain and Ireland (2005)
- The British 'B' film (co-author, with Steve Chibnall)
- The Encyclopedia of British Film (2011)
- Twenty British Films: A guided tour
- Double-Act: The remarkable lives and careers of Googie Withers and John McCallum
- The Never-Ending Brief Encounter
- Four from the Forties: Arliss, Crabtree, Knowles and Huntington (2018)
- Outback: Westerns in Australian Cinema (2024)
