= Eros Films =

British film distribution and production company

- Industry: Entertainment
- Founded: May 1947
- Founder: Philip Hyams; Sydney Hyams; Michael Hyams
- Defunct: June 1961
- Fate: Bankruptcy
- Headquarters: London, United Kingdom
- Products: Motion pictures

Eros Films was a British film distribution and, later, production company, in operation from May 1947 to June 1961. It was founded by three brothers: Philip, Sydney, and Michael Hyams.

== Hyams Bros ==
The Hyams' father was a Russian immigrant baker, who in association with architect George Coles financed the building of the Popular Cinema in 1912, located in Stepney, London. The oldest brother Philip (born London 26 March 1894; died London 8 January 1997) began working at the theatre in 1912 and was joined in 1919 by his younger brother Sydney. The two started a chain of cinemas that they then sold to Gaumont British in 1928; they began anew, creating another theatre chain. They linked again with Gaumont in 1935 to form Gaumont Super Cinemas, adding their brother Michael.

During the years of the Great Depression, the brothers attracted crowds by booking double bills, live variety acts, and talent shows. They sold again to Gaumont in 1944, due to reduced patronage during the London Blitz.

== History ==
In 1947, the brothers formed Eros Films, located at 111 Wardour Street, London, which was possibly named after the statue at Piccadilly Circus. Eros distributed American films but also financed and distributed British films made by independents; several British producers recalled that major British production units did not wish to distribute the films of minor British studios. Robert S. Baker of Tempean Films recalled that Eros distributed 20 to 30 of their films, usually shown as second features with popular American films, which Eros had acquired for UK distribution.

In the 1950s, Michael Hyams emigrated to the United States, where he became vice president of American British TV Movies Inc. The company distributed Eros' British productions to the American television market like Colonel March of Scotland Yard, Scotland Yard and a number of Eros-produced feature films.

== Co-production and production ==
Eros co-produced British films such as The Man Who Watched Trains Go By (1954), The Sea Shall Not Have Them (1955), and the American giant monster film Behemoth, the Sea Monster (1959), insisting the film have the same type of monster as The Beast from 20,000 Fathoms.

The company produced one film by themselves, the British World War II film Battle of the V-1 (1958).

== The end of Eros ==
Irving Allen and Albert R. Broccoli's Warwick Films had previously had a successful financing and distribution arrangement with Columbia Pictures, but there was occasionally friction between the two organisations. Allen thought they would increase their profits by creating their own distribution company to release films of a more highbrow nature than their successful action films. The two acquired Eros from the Hyams brothers in 1959, though the brothers remained on the board. Eros distributed Allen and Broccoli's The Trials of Oscar Wilde and Johnny Nobody, but both films failed at the box office.

The number of creditors and amounts owed by Eros led to the firm's bankruptcy in June 1961.
