= Robert S. Baker =

British film producer (1916–2009)

- Born: Robert Sidney Baker; 1916; London, England, United Kingdom
- Died: 30 September 2009 (aged 92)
- Occupations: Film and television producer; cinematographer; director; film studio co-founder
- Years active: 1948–2008
- Spouse: Alma Rubenstein
- Children: 2

Robert Sidney Baker (1916 – 30 September 2009) was a British film and television producer. At times, he was also a cinematographer and director. Born in London and serving as an artillery man in the British Army, he was posted to North Africa, where he became involved in the army's film and photographic unit, later serving as a combat cameraman in Europe.

== Film and television career ==
Despite a prolific film and television career, Baker was principally known for his long-time professional relationship with Monty Berman, where they founded Tempean Films, producing comedies, thrillers, and mysteries. Their work included Jack the Ripper, The Siege of Sidney Street, The Hellfire Club, and The Secret of Monte Carlo. Later, Baker was to be extensively involved with the filmed usage of the Leslie Charteris creation The Saint, and he produced The Persuaders!.

== Death ==
Baker died on 30 September 2009.

== Filmography as director ==
- Melody Club (1949) – co-director
- Blackout (1950)
- 13 East Street (1952)
- The Steel Key (1953)
- Passport to Treason (1956)
- Jack the Ripper (1959) – co-director
- The Siege of Sidney Street (1960) – co-director
- The Hellfire Club (1961) – co-director
