= Monty Berman =

English film and television producer (1913–2006)

- Born: Nestor Montague Berman; 16 August 1913; London, England
- Died: 14 June 2006 (aged 92); London, England
- Education: University College School
- Occupations: Cinematographer; film director; producer; screenwriter

Nestor Montague Berman (16 August 1913 – 14 June 2006) was an English producer, writer, cinematographer, and director of film and television. He was best known for his work at ITC Entertainment, particularly in collaboration with Dennis Spooner, where he created several television series including The Champions, Department S, and Jason King. He also co-founded the film production company Tempean Films.

== Life and career ==
Berman was born to Jewish parents in London's East End, and educated at University College School. He began his film career as a camera assistant at Twickenham Film Studios when he was 17. He became a camera operator in 1934, working for the Associated British Picture Corporation at Teddington Studios, and later for the comedy producers Ealing Studios.

When World War II came, Berman was allowed to continue his craft in an army film unit. There, he met and befriended Robert S. Baker, with whom he would go on to form a lifelong business partnership.

In 1948, they founded Tempean Films, which produced more than 30 B-movies in the 1950s. In 1962, Berman and Baker obtained the television rights to Leslie Charteris's The Saint.

Unable to sell the rights to Associated-Rediffusion, then Britain's largest commercial television company, Berman turned to Lew Grade's ITC. This company was at that time a sister company to ATV, and had access to important export markets. This allowed The Saint to do well in both Britain and in other markets.

=== Work with Dennis Spooner ===
Berman created more ITC productions, starting with The Baron, which led to a partnership with Dennis Spooner, one of the show's writers and Ray Austin, writer director. By 1967 they had launched a production company which created The Champions, Department S, its spin-off Jason King, Randall and Hopkirk (Deceased), and The Adventurer. A Guardian journalist later wrote of his work,

"Berman's television productions depicted a world in which all villains could be eliminated with a swift upper-cut to the jaw; all currency was referred to as dollars; everyone smoked filterless cigarettes; no Russian was to be trusted; and all foreign countries were represented by stock footage and redressed sets at Elstree."

After his work on The Adventurer was complete, Berman retired from production.

== Personal life ==
Berman married Ursula Ann Sharp in 1956. They had one child.

=== Death ===
Berman died in London, aged 92, on 14 June 2006.

== Select films ==
- Sea of Sand (1958)
