= Breakaway (1955 film) =

1955 British film by Henry Cass

- Original British quad poster
- Directed by: Henry Cass
- Written by: Norman Hudis
- Based on: an original story by Manning O'Brine
- Produced by: Robert S. Baker; Monty Berman
- Starring: Tom Conway; Michael Balfour; Honor Blackman; Brian Worth
- Cinematography: Monty Berman
- Edited by: Anne Barker
- Music by: Stanley Black; Ivor Slaney
- Production company: Cipa
- Distributed by: RKO Radio Pictures (UK)
- Release date: 16 July 1956 (UK)
- Running time: 72 minutes
- Country: United Kingdom
- Language: English

Breakaway is a 1955 British second feature ('B') thriller film directed by Henry Cass and starring Tom Conway, Michael Balfour and Honor Blackman. It was written by Norman Hudis based on a story by Manning O'Brine. A private eye is hot on the tail of a stolen secret formula and a kidnapped young woman. It is a sequel to Barbados Quest (1955).

== Plot ==
In Berlin, Johnny Matlock obtains a secret formula from a dying scientist. On his return to London, Matlock and his girlfriend Diane are attacked by a gang who steal the formula and kidnap Diane. Private investigator Tom "Duke" Martin investigates.

== Cast ==
- Tom Conway as Tom 'Duke' Martin
- Michael Balfour as Barney
- Honor Blackman as Paula Grant / Paula Jackson
- Brian Worth as Johnny Matlock
- Bruce Seton as Webb
- Freddie Mills as Pat
- Alexander Gauge as MacAllister
- John Horsley as Michael Matlock
- Paddy Webster as Diane Grant
- John Colicos as first kidnapper
- Larry Taylor as second kidnapper
- Arthur Lowe as Mitchell
- Frederick Schrecker as Professor Dohlmann

== Critical reception ==
The Monthly Film Bulletin wrote: "A rather confused thriller, with some familiar London locations and a number of car chases. Tom Conway and Michael Balfour give reliable performances as the private detective and his moronic partner.

Kine Weekly wrote: "Stoutly carpentered story, breezy light relief, pleasing romantic touches, hearty climax and quota ticket."

Today's Cinema called the film "slickly manufactured crime entertainment."

TV Guide called it an "absurd whodunit".

In British Sound Films: The Studio Years 1928–1959 David Quinlan rated the film as "mediocre", writing: "Tedious thriller with regulation car chases."

== See also ==
- Barbados Quest (1955)
