= Michael Balfour (actor) =

English actor (1918–1997)

- in The Private Life of Sherlock Holmes
- Born: 11 February 1918; Dover, Kent, England, UK
- Died: 24 October 1997 (aged 79); Esher, Surrey, England, UK
- Occupations: Actor, sculptor and clown
- Years active: 1938–1993
- Spouse: Kathleen Stuart
- Children: Shane Balfour and Perry Balfour

Michael Creighton Balfour (11 February 1918 – 24 October 1997) was an English actor, working mainly in British films and TV, following his TV debut in the BBC's The Marvellous History of St Bernard, in 1938. He was a recognisable face, often in small character parts and supporting roles, in nearly two hundred films and TV shows, from the 1940s to the 1990s, often playing comical heavies or otherwise shady characters notable for their "loud" clothes, sometimes convincingly cast as an American.

He worked for a roll call of film directors, including Tony Richardson, Pete Walker, Billy Wilder, Lewis Gilbert, Roman Polanski, Leslie Norman, Tim Burton, John Frankenheimer, François Truffaut, John Gilling, Stanley Donen, Ken Annakin, Cavalcanti, Lance Comfort, Terence Young, Gerald Thomas, Pasolini, John Paddy Carstairs, Terence Fisher, Val Guest, Frank Launder, John Huston, Basil Dearden and Howard Hawks.

Balfour had parts in many popular TV shows of the era including Department S, Educated Evans, Mess Mates, Danger Man, The Avengers, Hancock's Half Hour, Dixon of Dock Green, Rogue's Gallery, Z-Cars, The Onedin Line, and the detective drama The Vise, playing Saber's assistant Barney O'Keefe, and Strange Experiences.

In August 1958 Balfour was the passenger in a Jaguar XK140 driven by actor Bonar Colleano when it crashed, killing Colleano. Balfour's injuries required him to have 98 stitches, but he was discharged from hospital in time to attend Colleano's funeral.

As his screen career began to slow down in the late 1970s, Michael Balfour went on tour with European circuses, as a clown. He founded Circus Hazzard, and created his own clown character. His son later became a circus manager.

As well as performing, Balfour was a dedicated painter and sculptor, and in later years turned increasingly to sculpture and the arts, even running his own gallery for a while. For his subjects, he frequently drew on his own family career as a circus clown.

== Selected filmography ==
- Just William's Luck (1948) as Jenks
- No Orchids for Miss Blandish (1948) as Barney
- Sleeping Car to Trieste (1948) as Spiegel (uncredited)
- Woman Hater (1948) as Reporter (uncredited)
- The Small Voice (1948) as Frankie
- William Comes to Town (1948) as Stall-holder
- Stop Press Girl (1949) as Crook (uncredited)
- Don't Ever Leave Me (1949) as Jim Kennedy
- Helter Skelter (1949) as Barman (uncredited)
- Melody Club (1949) as Max
- Obsession (1949) as American sailor
- I Was a Male War Bride (1949) as Male Billet Sergeant (uncredited)
- Prelude to Fame (1950) as Lucio
- Cage of Gold (1950) as American Soldier (uncredited)
- Her Favourite Husband (1950) as Pete
- Blackout (1950) as Tom (uncredited)
- The Quiet Woman (1951) as Lefty
- A Case for PC 49 (1951) as Chubby Price
- 13 East Street (1952) as Joey Long
- Venetian Bird (1952) as Moretto
- Top Secret (1952) as Jersey Sailor
- Moulin Rouge (1952) as Dodo (uncredited)
- Hot Ice (1952) as Jacobson
- Three Steps to the Gallows (1953) as Carter – boxing fan
- Genevieve (1953) as Trumpeter (uncredited)
- The Steel Key (1953) as Sailor (uncredited)
- The Captain's Paradise (1953) as Customs official No. 2
- Johnny on the Run (1953) as Fingers
- The Red Beret (1953) as American Sergeant
- Recoil (1953) as Parkes
- Park Plaza 605 (1953) as Ted Birston
- Three's Company (1953) as The Drunk (segment "Take a Number' story)
- Albert R.N. (1953) as Hank
- Black 13 (1953) as Joe
- Small Town Story (1953) as Turner (uncredited)
- Love in Pawn (1953) as Alaric
- Escape by Night (1953) as Bearded Reporter (uncredited)
- River Beat (1954) as Adams
- The Diamond (1954) as Hoxie
- The Scarlet Web (1954) as Coffee Stallkeeper (uncredited)
- Delayed Action (1954) as Honey
- The Belles of St. Trinian's (1954) as Bus Driver (uncredited)
- The Sea Shall Not Have Them (1954) as Dray
- Devil's Point (1954) as Bennett, short henchman
- Impulse (1954) as Sailor (uncredited)
- Delavine Affair (1955) as Sammy
- One Good Turn (1955) as Boxing Booth Spectator (uncredited)
- The Gilded Cage (1955) as USAF staff (uncredited)
- Track the Man Down (1955) (uncredited)
- Barbados Quest (1955) as Barney Wilson
- Reluctant Bride (1955) as Boxer
- Gentlemen Marry Brunettes (1955) as Stage Doorman
- Secret Venture (1955) as Stevens
- It's a Great Day (1956) as Charlie Mead's Mate
- The Secret of the Forest (1956) as Len
- Reach for the Sky (1956) as Orderly (uncredited)
- Breakaway (1956) as Barney
- The Big Money (1956) as 'Wilberforce'
- Hour of Decision (1957) as Barman
- Quatermass 2 (1957) as Harry
- The Steel Bayonet (1957) as Pvt. Thomas
- Light Fingers (1957) as The Major
- Man from Tangier (1957) as Spade Murphy
- Fiend Without a Face (1958) as Sgt. Kasper
- Look Back in Anger (1959) as Picky Shopper (uncredited)
- The Flesh and the Fiends (1960) as Drunken Sailor
- Sink the Bismarck! (1960) as Able Seaman – Lookout on 'Suffolk' (uncredited)
- Carry On Constable (1960) as Matt
- Too Hot to Handle (1960) as Tourist guide
- Make Mine Mink (1960) as Rowson's Butler
- Surprise Package (1960) as Oscar (uncredited)
- The Hellfire Club (1961) as John – Juggler (uncredited)
- The Monster of Highgate Ponds (1961) as Bert
- The Treasure of Monte Cristo (1961) as Pepe
- Pit of Darkness (1961) as Fisher
- Design for Loving (1962) as Bernie
- She Always Gets Their Man (1962) as Runkle
- The Fast Lady (1962) as Bandit #2
- The Rescue Squad (1963) as Barrow-Boy
- Echo of Diana (1963) as Newsagent
- A Stitch in Time (1963) as Workman with Mallet (uncredited)
- Five Have a Mystery to Solve (1964) as Emilio
- The Sicilians (1964) as Stage Door Keeper
- Strangler's Web (1965) as John Vichelski
- The Sandwich Man (1966) as Workman (uncredited)
- Kaleidoscope (1966) as Poker Player #4
- Where the Bullets Fly (1966) as Band Leader
- Fahrenheit 451 (1966) as Book Person: Machiavelli's 'The Prince' (uncredited)
- Press for Time (1966) as Sewerman
- Trouble with Junia (1967) as Joe Pennyworth
- Department S (1968) as Eccles
- The Fixer (1968) as Boatman (uncredited)
- The Oblong Box (1969) as Ruddock
- Hoverbug (1969) as Mr. Gutteridge
- The Adventurers (1970) as Detective
- The Private Life of Sherlock Holmes (1970) as Cabby
- Macbeth (1971) as First Murderer
- Man of Violence (1971) as Cafe Owner
- All Coppers Are... (1972) as Heart Attack Victim (uncredited)
- The Canterbury Tales (1972) as The Carpenter (segment the Miller's Tale)
- Wreck Raisers (1972) as Mr. Trevor
- The Copter Kids (1976) as Benny Baker
- Joseph Andrews (1977) as Ruffian
- Come Play with Me (1977) as Nosher
- Candleshoe (1977) as Mr. McCress
- The Stick Up (1977) as Sam
- The Prisoner of Zenda (1979) as Luger
- The Holcroft Covenant (1985) as Hard Hat
- Batman (1989) as Axis Chemicals scientist
- The Krays (1990) as Referee
- Revenge of Billy the Kid (1992) as Gyles MacDonald (final film role)
