= Kill Me Tomorrow =

1957 British film by Terence Fisher

- Theatrical release poster
- Directed by: Terence Fisher
- Written by: Robert Falconer; Manning O'Brine
- Story by: Robert Falconer
- Produced by: Francis Searle; Richard Gordon
- Starring: Pat O'Brien; Lois Maxwell; George Coulouris; Tommy Steele
- Cinematography: Geoffrey Faithfull
- Edited by: Ann Chegwidden
- Music by: Temple Abady
- Production companies: Tempean Films; Amalgamated Productions
- Distributed by: Renown Pictures (UK)
- Release date: 1957
- Running time: 80 min.
- Country: United Kingdom
- Language: English

Kill Me Tomorrow is a 1957 British crime film directed by Terence Fisher and starring Pat O'Brien and Lois Maxwell. It was written by Robert Falconer and Manning O'Brine and made by Tempean Films at Southall Studios in West London.

The film features a cameo by Tommy Steele.

== Plot ==
After suffering a series of personal setbacks and in desperate need of cash, reporter Bart Crosbie tries to get his old job back. But when he returns to the newspaper offices, Crosbie discovers that his former boss has been murdered. He is then offered money by the killer, a diamond smuggler, to take the murder rap.

== Cast ==
- Pat O'Brien as Bart Crosbie
- Lois Maxwell as Jill Brook
- George Coulouris as Heinz Webber
- Wensley Pithey as Inspector Lane
- Tommy Steele as himself
- Freddie Mills as Waxy Lister
- Ronald Adam as Mr. Brook
- Robert Brown as Steve Ryan
- Richard Pasco as Dr. Fisher
- April Olrich as Bella Braganza
- Peter Swanwick as Harrison
- Al Mulock as Rod
- Larry Taylor as Carson (uncredited)
- Ian Wilson as Marty (uncredited)

== Critical reception ==
The Monthly Film Bulletin wrote: "Spiced with maudlin sentiment on the one hand and a guest appearance by Tommy Steele on the other, this is a competent but unconvincing crime story. However odd the teaming of Pat O'Brien and Lois Maxwell, the playing is quite adequate."

The Radio Times called the film a "far-fetched B-movie ...Terence Fisher directs with little enthusiasm, but it's worth hanging in there to catch the debut of Tommy Steele."

In British Sound Films: The Studio Years 1928–1959 David Quinlan rated the film as "average", writing: "Sombre drama, adequately acted."

TV Guide wrote, "it's overplayed and melodramatic but has enough intrigue to make it watchable."
