= Larry Taylor (actor) =

English actor and stuntman (1918–2003)

- Born: 13 July 1918; Peterborough, England
- Died: 6 August 2003 (aged 85); Johannesburg, South Africa
- Occupation: Actor
- Years active: 1946–1995

Larry Taylor (13 July 1918 – 6 August 2003) was an English actor and stuntman. He spent twelve years in the British army before World War II. After demobilization he got a job in the film industry. He was the father of Rocky Taylor. Taylor mainly played villainous supporting roles in dozens of UK films and television episodes from the 1950s until the early 1970s, when he moved to South Africa in the mid-1970s, and from then on he appeared in a mixture of international movies filmed there and domestic South African films and television episodes.

== Selected filmography ==
- The Captive Heart (1946) - Sergeant (uncredited)
- No Orchids for Miss Blandish (1948) - Cop (uncredited)
- Silent Dust (1949) - Lorry driver in flashback sequence (uncredited)
- The Glass Mountain (1949) - Sleeping Man (uncredited)
- Cardboard Cavalier (1949) - Rider (uncredited)
- The Case of Charles Peace (1949) - Prison Guard on train (uncredited)
- Dick Barton Strikes Back (1949) - Nick
- Diamond City (1949) - Digger (uncredited)
- Laughter in Paradise (1951) - Card Player (uncredited)
- Wings of Danger (1952) - O'Gorman, henchman (uncredited)
- Lady in the Fog (1952) - Hospital Attendant (uncredited)
- The Gambler and the Lady (1952) - Shadow (uncredited)
- Three Steps to the Gallows (1953) - Sam
- Sea Devils (1953) - Blasquito
- Johnny on the Run (1953) - Bert (uncredited)
- Take a Powder (1953) - Spike
- Johnny on the Spot (1954) - (uncredited)
- Five Days (1954) - Tough in Bar (uncredited)
- Breakaway (1955) - Second Kidnapper (uncredited)
- Cloak Without Dagger (1956) - Sergeant Blake
- Alexander the Great (1956) - Perdiccas
- Port Afrique (1956) - the First Arab
- You Pay Your Money (1957) - 2nd. Thug
- Kill Me Tomorrow (1957) - Carson
- Robbery Under Arms (1957) - Burke
- The Gypsy and the Gentleman (1958) - Cropped Harry
- Carve Her Name with Pride (1958) - German Soldier on Train (uncredited)
- Wonderful Things! (1958) - Minor Role (uncredited)
- A Night to Remember (1958) - Seaman (uncredited)
- The Gun Runners (1958) - (uncredited)
- The Sheriff of Fractured Jaw (1958) - The Gun Guard
- The Man Who Liked Funerals (1959) - Maxie
- First Man Into Space (1959) - Shore Patrolman - Taylor
- The Bandit of Zhobe (1959) - Ahmed
- Two Way Stretch (1960) - Rockingham Quarry Prison Warder (uncredited)
- The Shakedown (1960) - 2nd Thug
- And the Same to You (1960) - Chappy Tuck
- Too Hot to Handle (1960) - Mouth
- The Criminal (1960) - Charles
- Swiss Family Robinson (1960) - Battoo - Pirate
- The Professionals (1960) - Cairns
- The Bulldog Breed (1960) - Fraser (uncredited)
- She'll Have to Go (1961) - Train Driver
- The Singer Not the Song (1961) - Gang Member (uncredited)
- The Long Shadow (1961) - Heinz
- Information Received (1961) - Darnell
- Never Back Losers (1961) - Reilly
- Crosstrap (1962) - Peron
- K.I.L. 1 (1962)
- Nudes of All Nations (1962) - Villager (uncredited)
- In Search of the Castaways (1962) - Ayerton Hijacker One (uncredited)
- On the Beat (1962) - O'Flynn's Henchman (uncredited)
- Lawrence of Arabia (1962) Turkish Soldier (uncredited)
- Time to Remember (1962) - Garritty
- That Kind of Girl (1963)
- Cleopatra (1963) - Roman Officer (uncredited)
- The Girl Hunters (1963) - The Dragon
- The Man Who Finally Died (1963) - Ernst (uncredited)
- Zulu (1964) - Hughes
- King and Country (1964) - Sergeant Major
- The Curse of the Mummy's Tomb (1964) - Swordsman (uncredited)
- Young Cassidy (1965) - 2nd Theatre Thug (uncredited)
- The High Bright Sun (1965) - Minor Role (uncredited)
- The Intelligence Men (1965) - Stagehand (uncredited)
- Judith (1966)
- Arabesque (1966) - Beshraavi's Henchman (uncredited)
- Kaleidoscope (1966) - Dominion Chauffeur
- The Magnificent Two (1967) - Paco
- Follow That Camel (1967) - Riff
- Casino Royale (1967) - Russian Officer / Cowboy (uncredited)
- Here We Go Round the Mulberry Bush (1968) - Thug in Daydream (uncredited)
- Carry On Up the Khyber (1968) - Burpa at Door-Grid (uncredited)
- Chitty Chitty Bang Bang (1968) - Lieutenant
- The File of the Golden Goose (1969) - Thug
- The Best House in London (1969) - Toff (uncredited)
- One More Time (1970) - Man In pub (uncredited)
- The Wife Swappers (1970) - Leonard
- A Promise of Bed (1970) - Policeman
- The Last Valley (1971) - Garnak
- Kidnapped (1971) - (uncredited)
- Mary, Queen of Scots (1971) - Laird (uncredited)
- Nobody Ordered Love (1972) - Camera operator
- Lady Caroline Lamb (1972) - Man at Bare Knuckle Fight (uncredited)
- Ooh... You Are Awful (1972) - Hood
- Psychomania (1973) - Lorry Driver (uncredited)
- Thriller (1973 Episode: An Echo of Theresa) - Sagar
- The Creeping Flesh (1973) - 1st Warder
- And Now the Screaming Starts! (1973) - Bearded drunk
- The MacKintosh Man (1973) - Inmate (uncredited)
- S*P*Y*S (1974) - Lippet's Bodyguard
- Carry On Dick (1974) - Tough man
- De Wet's Spoor (1975) - Troop Sgt. Phillips
- One Away (1976) - Foreman
- My Way II (1977)
- Golden Rendezvous (1977) - an Attacker
- Mister Deathman (1977) - Vlees / Vlees' Twin
- Slavers (1978) - Captain George Williams
- Zulu Dawn (1979) - Grenadier (uncredited)
- Prisoners of the Lost Universe (1983) - Vosk
- Stoney: The One and Only (1984) - Fight announcer
- Go for the Gold (1984) - Desk clerk
- Gor (1987) - King Marlenus
- An African Dream (1987) - Arthur Sharp
- Skeleton Coast (1988) - Robbins
- Outlaw of Gor (1988) - Marlenus
- Lethal Woman (1988) - General Grant
- Out on Bail (1989) - Judge Creighton
- Burndown (1990) - Chuck
- The Mangler (1995) - Sheriff Hughes (final film role)
