= Guilt Is My Shadow =

1950 British film by Roy Kellino

- Directed by: Roy Kellino
- Screenplay by: Roy Kellino; Ivan Foxwell; John Gilling (additional scenes)
- Based on: You're Best Alone; 1943 novel by Norah Lofts
- Produced by: Ivan Foxwell
- Starring: Elizabeth Sellars; Patrick Holt; Peter Reynolds
- Cinematography: William McLeod
- Edited by: George Clark
- Music by: Hans May
- Production company: ABPC
- Distributed by: Associated British-Pathé; Stratford Pictures Corporation
- Release date: 22 March 1950
- Running time: 86 minutes
- Country: United Kingdom
- Language: English
- Box office: £102,299 (UK)

Guilt Is My Shadow is a 1950 British drama film directed by Roy Kellino and starring Elizabeth Sellars, Patrick Holt and Peter Reynolds. The screenplay was by Kellino, Ivan Foxwell and John Gilling, based on the 1943 novel You're Best Alone by Norah Lofts.

A woman is haunted by her conscience after she kills a man and hides the body.

== Plot ==
Jamie is the getaway driver for a gang of robbers, but when the robbery goes wrong he drives off and makes his way by car and then train to a rural village, Welford, in Devon, where his estranged uncle, Kit, lives alone. Although Kit is not particularly pleased to see Jamie, he allows him to stay for a couple of days.

A couple of days' stopover turns into an indefinite period, as Jamie, all the while sneering at Kit's rural life, gets a job at the local garage and eats Kit out of house and home. Things get momentarily worse for Kit as Jamie's estranged wife Linda turns up, hoping for reconciliation, but although Kit is wary of another unwanted guest at first, Linda is far more amenable than Jamie, whose attention has been diverted away by Betty, a single woman in the village whom he starts an affair with.

Jamie is found to be stealing from Kit as well as the garage and when Linda confronts him he assaults her, and she kills him accidentally in an act of self-defence. Kit and Linda decide to hide the body, which draws them even closer together, and after telling the few people that are interested that Jamie has left the farm, life continues as before with Kit and Linda having fallen in love. Linda is still haunted by memories of Jamie however, and the situation becomes worse when Jamie's mother Eva arrives unexpectedly to see Jamie.

Linda suffers something akin to a nervous breakdown, and the local doctor called to assist becomes suspicious at Linda's condition and actions, and calls the police. The police arrive and search for Jamie's body but are unable to find it, and are about to leave, when Linda's conscience gets the better of her and she calls them back to the house, presumably to make a complete confession and face the consequences, with Kit by her side.

== Relationship to novel ==
The film departs from the plot of the original novel, in which it is Kit who accidentally kills Jamie, and is in love with pathetic Linda. Her subsequent pregnancy is certainly Jamie's though she tells naïve Kit it is his. Her extravagant and extreme fear of childbirth leads her to a kind of emotional breakdown in which she tells police that Kit murdered her husband Jamie. The body is not found, but Kit commits suicide, alone with his beloved dog who he shoots first, reasoning she is too old to take to a new master. His note absolves Linda completely though she was certainly complicit. He does this for love of her, and for Jamie whom he disliked and disapproved of, but who was his much-loved sister's son and who was nothing as glamorous as a getaway driver, but rather a middle class, though seedy, con man.

== Locations ==
An early shot is of the Torbay Express at Paddington and the scene then shifts to a shot of a down express at Coryton's Cove, Dawlish. There follow many scenes shot at Ashburton with Tillingham's garage being located next door to the site of the former Golden Lion hotel. Linda arrives by train at Staverton railway station where steam engines still run on the South Devon Railway (heritage railway) but the shot of her leaving the station jumps back to Ashburton. Recognisable coastal scenes are in Torquay where Thatcher's Rock, Hope's Nose and Long Quarry Point under Wall's Hill all appear in shot. The outdoor shots of the farmhouse were at Whitedell Farm, Sarratt, Hertfordshire

== Cast ==
- Elizabeth Sellars as Linda
- Patrick Holt as Kit
- Peter Reynolds as Jamie
- Lana Morris as Betty
- Avice Landone as Eva
- Lawrence O'Madden as Tom
- Wensley Pithey as Tillingham
- Esma Cannon as Peggy
- Aubrey Woods as doctor
- Willoughby Gray as detective

== Critical reception ==
Variety called it "a slow, meandering story."

The Monthly Film Bulletin wrote: "The film is a curious blend of a melodramatic story, handled heavily, theatrically and monotonously, with a background which, although often equally artificial in treatment, occasionally shows some traces of real feeling for the country. These are certainly the only real moments in the picture, which is far too self-conscious in style, and which suffers from an inordinately stilted script, and some intolerably wooden acting. Mr. Kellino might have done better with real unknowns; he has fallen back on Patrick Holt, who gives a very wooden performance, and on Lana Morris, playing much as usual but hampered by direction which drives home every line with the subtlety of a sledge-hammer. Elizabeth Sellars, a real actress makes a brave attempt to play naturally in the fravalling atmosphere of unreality. The complete failure of this film is all the sadder in that it is just this type of inexpensive and out of the way picture that the British cinema now needs. It is tragic when one considers that from the point of view of style and technique the film might well date from fifteen years ago."

Allmovie wrote, "setting this one apart from other British crime mellers of the era was the decision to film on location in a remote rural community. A passable timefiller when first released, Guilt is My Shadow ended up a staple of American TV in the 1950s and 1960s."

Filmink wrote Reynolds "stole the movie".
