= Brian Worth =

English actor (1914–1978)

- Brian Worth in Scrooge
- Born: 30 July 1914; London, England
- Died: 25 August 1978 (aged 64); Seville, Spain
- Occupation: Actor
- Years active: 1938–1972

Brian Worth (30 July 1914 – 25 August 1978) was an English actor, known for Scrooge (1951), The Man in the White Suit (1951) and An Inspector Calls (1954). He died in Seville, Spain on 25 August 1978 aged 64.

== Career ==
Educated in Britain and America, he learnt the technical side of commercial advertising films before deciding to turn to acting. During the Second World War he served in the armed forces (1941–1946). An officer in the Special Operations Executive, he worked out of Algeria and then Seville, based at the British embassy, escorting agents over the Pyrenees into France, and exfiltrating agents and escaped airmen back to “neutral” Spain.

Between 1946 and 1947 he acted on stage.

During the first half of the 1950s, Worth had prominent supporting roles in over a dozen films, including playing the progressive teacher Mr Judd in Tom Brown's Schooldays (1951). He had a supporting role in the acclaimed sci-fi miniseries Quatermass and the Pit, and played the title role in the short-lived series Francis Storm Investigates. From 1956, his roles grew smaller, although his later film appearances did include four for noted director Michael Powell as well as a small role in a James Bond movie, On Her Majesty's Secret Service (1969).

In the 1960s and 1970s, he and his Spanish wife Tere ran a popular Spanish restaurant in a basement in Draycott Avenue, Chelsea.

== Filmography ==
Film
Year	Title	Role	Notes
1939	Ask a Policeman	Radio Engineer	Uncredited
1939	The Arsenal Stadium Mystery	Philip Morring – Trojan Team Member	
1939	The Lion Has Wings	Bobby	
1940	Pastor Hall	Werner von Grotjahn	
1940	It Happened to One Man	Jack Quair	
1948	One Night with You	Third Writer	
1949	Cardboard Cavalier	Tom Pride	
1950	Last Holiday	Derek Rockingham	
1951	The Man in the White Suit	King	
1951	Scrooge	Fred	
1951	Tom Brown's Schooldays	Judd	
1952	Song of Paris	Jim Barrett	
1952	Treasure Hunt	Philip	
1952	Father's Doing Fine	Wilfred	
1952	It Started in Paradise	Michael	
1952	Hindle Wakes	Alan Jeffcote	
1953	Operation Diplomat	Geoffrey Terry	
1954	An Inspector Calls	Gerald Croft	
1954	Thought to Kill	Camden	
1955	Barbados Quest	Geoffrey Blake	
1955	Windfall	Michael Collins	
1955	Breakaway	Johnny Matlock	
1956	Assignment Redhead	Captain Ridgeway	
1956	The Battle of the River Plate	Radio Operator, Doric Star, Prisoner on Graf Spee	Uncredited
1957	Ill Met by Moonlight	Stratis Saviolkis	
1958	The Square Peg	Henri Le Blanc	
1959	Room at the Top	Man in Sports Car	Uncredited
1960	Moment of Danger	Airport Guard	
1960	Sink the Bismarck!	Torpedo Control Officer on First Destroyer	Uncredited
1960	Peeping Tom	Assistant Director	Uncredited
1960	Dead Lucky	Lucky Lewis	
1961	The Terror of the Tongs	Commissioner Harcourt	
1965	Rotten to the Core	C.O. Longhampton Camp	Uncredited
1969	On Her Majesty's Secret Service	Manuel	Uncredited
1972	The Boy Who Turned Yellow	Mr. Saunders	

== Television ==
In 1965, he played the part of Peter Corrio in The Saint, in the 4th episode of the 4th season, "The Smart Detective".

In The Prisoner (1967-68) episode Many Happy Returns, he played an RAF Group Captain.
