= Charles Farrell (Irish actor) =

Irish actor (1900–1988)

- Born: 6 August 1900; Dublin, Ireland, United Kingdom
- Died: 27 August 1988 (aged 88); London, England, United Kingdom
- Occupation: Actor
- Years active: 1927–1977 (film)

Charles Farrell (6 August 1900 – 27 August 1988) was an Irish stage, film and television actor.

Born 6 August 1900 in Dublin, Ireland, Farrell moved to America and appeared in a stock company in Detroit when a child. In 1921, he moved to England and made his first stage appearance at the Coliseum. His first film appearance was in John Bunny and Flora Finch comedies. Unlike his heroic American namesake, he was later cast in villainous film roles. This contrasted with his frequent broadcasts of fairy tales on BBC radio's Children's Hour.

== Selected filmography ==
- The Ring (1927) - Second (uncredited)
- Song of Soho (1930) - Legionnaire
- The Man at Six (1931) - George Wollmer
- The Flying Fool (1931) - Ponder
- Creeping Shadows (1931) - Chicago Joe
- Tonight's the Night: Pass It On (1931) - Williams
- Money for Nothing (1932) - Digger
- The Innocents of Chicago (1932) - Smiler
- The House Opposite (1932) - Wharton
- The Sign of Four (1932) - Funfair Patron (uncredited)
- Jack's the Boy (1932) - Martin
- Looking on the Bright Side (1932) - Tough Man In Street (uncredited)
- Lucky Ladies (1932) - Bookmaker
- Red Wagon (1933) - Milligan
- The Stolen Necklace (1933) - Sailor
- Wild Boy (1934) - Gang Member (uncredited)
- Boys Will Be Boys (1935) - Louis Brown
- Two Hearts in Harmony (1935) - Charles Farrell
- Under Proof (1936) - Spike
- The Amazing Quest of Ernest Bliss (1936) - Scales
- Lonely Road (1936) - Palmer
- Treachery on the High Seas (1936) - Logan
- Jericho (1937) - Sergeant on Guard (uncredited)
- Meet Mr. Penny (1938) - Jackson
- The Rebel Son (1938) - Tovkatch
- Night Journey (1938) - Dave
- Jailbirds (1940) - Spike Nelson
- Convoy (1940) - Walker
- Dangerous Moonlight (1940) - First Cab Driver
- Schweik's New Adventures (1943) - Czech nazi
- Bell-Bottom George (1944) - Jim Bennett
- Meet Sexton Blake! (1945) - Skipper
- The Way to the Stars (1945) - American Orderly
- Don Chicago (1945) - Don Dooley
- This Man Is Mine (1946) - Canadian Sergeant (uncredited)
- The Turners of Prospect Road (1947) - Jack
- They Made Me a Fugitive (1947) - Curley
- Boys in Brown (1949) - Mr. Sykes (uncredited)
- Night and the City (1950) - Mickey Beer
- There Is Another Sun (1951) - Simmonds
- Madame Louise (1951) - Felling
- The Crimson Pirate (1952) - Poison Paul
- Miss Robin Hood (1952) - Police Constable (uncredited)
- There Was a Young Lady (1953) - Arthur
- Final Appointment (1954) - Percy
- Out of the Clouds (1955) - Perce (Scarface) (uncredited)
- The Hornet's Nest (1955) - Posh Peterson
- See How They Run (1955) - Basher
- Stolen Assignment (1955) - Percy Simpson
- Morning Call (1957) - John Karver
- The Diplomatic Corpse (1958) - Percy Simpson
- The Sheriff of Fractured Jaw (1958) - Bartender
- Death Over My Shoulder (1958) - Shiv Maitland
- Hidden Homicide (1959) - Mungo Peddy
- Too Young to Love (1960) - Waiting Room Man
- Operation Cupid (1960) - Charlie Stevens
- Surprise Package (1960) - Nick Jamieson (uncredited)
- The Girl Hunters (1963) - Joe Grissi
- Chimes at Midnight (1965)
- Sebastian (1968) - Taxi Driver
- Oh! What a Lovely War (1969) - Policeman (uncredited)
- The Vampire Lovers (1970) - Landlord
- Countess Dracula (1971) - The Seller
- The Abominable Dr. Phibes (1971) - Chauffeur
- Valentino (1977) - Drunk (uncredited) (final film role)
