= Man from Tangier =

1957 British film by Lance Comfort

- U.S. 1-sheet poster
- Directed by: Lance Comfort
- Written by: Paddy Manning O'Brine
- Produced by: W.G. Chalmers
- Starring: Robert Hutton; Lisa Gastoni; Martin Benson; Derek Sydney
- Cinematography: Geoffrey Faithfull
- Edited by: Peter Mayhew
- Music by: Wilfred Burns
- Production company: Butcher's Film Service
- Distributed by: Butcher's Film Service (UK); Republic Pictures (US)
- Release date: 27 June 1957 (UK)
- Running time: 67 mins
- Country: United Kingdom
- Language: English

Man from Tangier (U.S. title: Thunder over Tangier) is a 1957 British second feature crime film directed by Lance Comfort and starring Robert Hutton, Lisa Gastoni and Martin Benson. It was written by Paddy Manning O'Brine.

== Plot ==
A criminal flees from Tangier to London with forged money plates, leading to the gang he works for sending a dangerous woman to pursue him.

== Main cast ==
- Robert Hutton as Chuck Collins
- Lisa Gastoni as Michele
- Martin Benson as Voss
- Derek Sydney as Darracq
- Leonard Sachs as Heinrich
- Emerton Court as Armstrong
- Richard Shaw as Johnny
- Robert Raglan as Inspector Meredith
- Harold Berens as Sammy
- Jack Allen as Rex
- Michael Balfour as Spade Murphy
- Frank Forsyth as Sergeant Irons
- Reginald Hearne as Walters
- Fred Lake as hotel porter
- Alex Gallier as Max
- Marianne Stone as woman in hotel
- Ronnie Clark as Coster

== Releases ==
Man in Tangier was cut by the British Board of Film Classification to 67 minutes running time, in order to achieve a "U" classification. The film premiered at Odeon Marble Arch in London on 27 January 1957, where it ran as a double bill together with Monkey on My Back (1957).

In April 2011 the film was released on DVD as a double bill together with director Lance Comfort's 1961 film The Breaking Point.

== Critical reception ==
The Monthly Film Bulletin wrote: "A fairly competent thriller, in which the upholders of the law are considerably more convincing than the crooks, with their alternating foreign and public-school accents. The story is very vaguely constructed; initially there seems very little reason for introducing Tangier; towards the end the action is almost incoherent."

Picturegoer wrote: "A paper-thin plot is blown up to bursting point by a lot of agitated but pointless action taking in murder, blackmail and roughstuff with precious few thrills."

Picture Show called the film a "neatly made, holding melodrama."

In British Sound Films: The Studio Years 1928–1959 David Quinlan rated the film as "mediocre", writing: "Lots of huff and puff bursts paper-thin plot."

The Radio Times Guide to Films gave the film 2/5 stars, writing: "This barely acceptable B-thriller was made at a time when British cinemas habitually ran supporting features to give you time to buy your soft drinks and popcorn."
