= Pale Moon Rising =

Novel

First US edition (publ. St. Martin's Press)

Pale Moon Rising is a 1977 novel by Manning O'Brine. The last of his 11 books about secret agents and their murderous struggles with Nazis both during and after World War II, it was published by Futura in England and by St. Martin's Press in the United States, apparently the same year that O'Brine died. It is narrated by a nameless hero of Italian birth and more than one nationality, who joins the British undercover services in the early days of the war, impelled primarily by a single-minded, overriding desire to kill Germans.

After months of arduous training in all parts of the British Isles, he is parachuted into the French countryside to take up the leadership of a band of a Resistance fighters. Grim and totally with humor, the rest of the book is a straightforward narrative of his brutal and merciless attacks against German targets, his eventual capture by the Gestapo in Paris, the ghastly tortures he undergoes at their hands, and his escape from their heavily guarded prison. In the final pages he makes his way south over a period of weeks to Marseille, garroting or otherwise killing dozens of German troops as he proceeds. The last we see of him, he has urinated into a large soup pot in a restaurant's kitchen, a soup that will be used to feed German officers. He is headed for a small sailboat in which he will try to reach the British sanctuary of Gibraltar—since the book begins many years later with the hero's reflections as he visits the over-grown site of one of his early training camps, we know that he does indeed successfully evade the German forces who have been scouring France for him.

== Critical reception ==
O'Brine's three previous novels had enjoyed a certain amount of critical success, but he was far from being a well-known writer of spy fiction. The New York Times, nevertheless, did give a favorable review to his last book:

[It] is well-written and is an exciting adventure story. But transcending all is Mr. O'Brine's loathing for Nazi Germany, the ubermenschen and all they represented. He uses his book as a not very subtle tract to condemn the system."

Kirkus Reviews, however, which writes pre-publication reviews for the publishing industry and libraries, was mostly horrified by the book:

The nameless narrator of this foul but energetic vengeance memoir fondly recalls his churning hatred of Nazis, those glorious times 30+ years ago when he was hurtling about the French moonlight, giving Nazis piano-wire neckties and blades up the rectum, all the while muttering in outrage at the swinish dead. Ah, callow youth—when he was a British saboteur leading French guerrillas in raids on Nazi airfields and gas dumps, fixing enemy anti-aircraft shells so they'd blow up on gunners. His knife, fast as a lynx, could deal three separately fatal wounds before a body hit the earth. Unfortunately for our nostalgic exterminator, he went against the first tenet of underground work and had sex with radio operator Soulange. When they were captured, they were tortured exquisitely, and then pregnant Soulange was savagely shot before his eyes, adding frothingly fresh power to his already hyperactive hatred of Nazis. His fondest memory of all: escaping and—on the way out—quietly pissing into a cauldron of soup and dumplings soon to be served to the Boche pigs. Today our hero bemoans having held back, not having killed more, many more, and more viciously. Especially recommended for aspiring mass murderers and beginning psychopaths.

The review misspells the name of the narrator's sometime companion: she is Solange, not Soulange.
