= Kenneth Hayles =

British screenwriter

Kenneth Hayles was a British writer who moved to Australia.

== Select credits ==
- The Last Appointment (1954)
- Companions in Crime (1954)
- Track the Man Down (1955)
- Murder on Approval (1955)
- Stolen Assignment (1955)
- Secret Venture (1955)
- No Smoking (1955)
- Find the Lady (1956)
- Passport to Treason (1956)
- The Hideout (1956)
- Suspended Alibi (1957)
- Blind Spot (1958)
- Ghost Squad (1961)
- Write Me a Murder (1965)
- The Voice (1966)
- The Attack (1966)
- The Link Men (1967)
- The Rovers (1969)
