= Patrick Holt =

British actor (1912–1993)

- Born: Patrick George Parsons; 31 January 1912; Cheltenham, Gloucestershire, England
- Died: 12 October 1993 (aged 81); London, England
- Other name: Patrick Parsons
- Occupation: Actor
- Years active: 1938–1990
- Spouses: Sonia Holm (m. 1947; div. 1953) Sandra Dorne (m. 1954; died 1992)

Patrick Holt (31 January 1912 – 12 October 1993) was an English film and television actor.

== Biography ==
Born Patrick Parsons in Cheltenham, Gloucestershire, Holt spent some of his childhood in India with his uncle, after which he was sent to Christ's Hospital, a famous charity school in Britain. Here he formed a close friendship with a boy in the same boarding house, the future film star Michael Wilding.

He started his acting career in repertory theatres, and in 1939, landed a leading part on the London stage, as well as minor roles in films such as The Return of the Frog (1938) but his career was interrupted when the Second World War broke out and he joined the army. His army service saw him in Burma, Singapore and India, often on secret missions behind enemy lines, and he rose to the rank of lieutenant colonel.

== Career ==
After the war he joined the J. Arthur Rank charm school and after supporting roles in films such as Hungry Hill, Frieda and The October Man (all 1947), steadily established himself as a lead actor in films of the late 1940s, including The Mark of Cain (1947), My Sister and I (1948), Marry Me and A Boy, a Girl and a Bike (both 1949).

His leading man status in prestige films was brief and he found himself as the star of 'B' movies during the fifties and early sixties, with the film writer David Quinlan calling him "the Dennis Price of the B film", although something of a misnomer as the actors were not alike, Holt playing a wider variety of character types. These second features included Guilt Is My Shadow (1950), Stolen Assignment (1955), Miss Tulip Stays the Night (1955) and Suspended Alibi (1957), with his final lead roles coming in the 1962 films Serena, Flight from Singapore and Night of the Prowler. During this period he also took on supporting roles in bigger budget movies such as Ivanhoe (1952) and I Was Monty's Double (1958). He also appeared on stage during the decade and in 1953 co-starred with Anna Neagle in the musical The Glorious Days in the West End.

He was one of many leading men and women of the 1950s who struggled to maintain their status as leads beyond the early 1960s. However, by evolving into a character actor, he sustained his career into old age, working on stage and television as well as in the cinema, and he was still listed in the Spotlight casting directory at the time of his death. Later film appearances include Guns at Batasi (1964), Thunderball (1965), Young Winston (1972) and The Wild Geese (1978), while television included The Avengers, The Saint, Dixon of Dock Green, Armchair Theatre, Crown Court, Shabby Tiger, Survivors, Poldark The Eagle of the Ninth and Emmerdale.

== Personal life ==
His first wife was the actress Sonia Holm. In 1954, he married Sandra Dorne, with whom he had occasionally co-starred.

== Selected filmography ==
- The Challenge (1938) - Minor Role (uncredited)
- The Return of the Frog (1938) - Cadet with Question (uncredited)
- Sword of Honour (1939) - Lord Talmadge
- Convoy (1940) - Holt (uncredited)
- Hungry Hill (1947) - Ward
- Frieda (1947) - Alan
- The October Man (1947) - Harry Carden
- It Happened Today (1947) - Film Commentator
- Master of Bankdam (1947) - Lemuel Pickersgill
- When the Bough Breaks (1947) - Robert Norman
- The Mark of Cain (1947) - John Howard
- My Sister and I (1948) - Roger Crisp
- Portrait from Life (1948) - Ferguson
- Fly Away Peter (1948) - John Neilson
- A Boy, a Girl and a Bike (1949) - Sam Walters
- Marry Me! (1949) - Martin Roberts
- Boys in Brown (1949) - Tigson
- Guilt Is My Shadow (1950) - Kit
- The Magic Box (1951) - Sitter in Bath Studio
- 13 East Street (1952) - Inspector Gerald Blake
- Come Back Peter (1952) - John Neilson
- Ivanhoe (1952) - Philip DeMalvoisin
- Circumstantial Evidence (1952) - Michael Carteret
- John Wesley (1954) - Thomas Maxfield
- A Stranger Came Home (1954) - Job Crandall
- The Golden Link (1954) - Terry Maguire
- The Men of Sherwood Forest (1954) - King Richard
- The Dark Avenger (1955) - Sir Ellys
- Miss Tulip Stays the Night (1955) - Andrew Dax
- Stolen Assignment (1955) - Henry Crossley
- Alias John Preston (1955) - Sylvia's Husband in Dream
- The Gelignite Gang (1956) - John Rutherford
- The Girl in the Picture (1957) - Inspector Bliss
- Operation Murder (1957) - Dr. Bowen
- Suspended Alibi (1957) - Paul Pearson
- Murder Reported (1957) - Bill Stevens
- There's Always a Thursday (1957) - Middleton
- Fortune Is a Woman (1957) - Fred Connor
- I Was Monty's Double (1958) - Col. Dawson
- Further Up the Creek (1958) - First Lieutenant (uncredited)
- Too Hot to Handle (1960) - Inspector West
- The Challenge (1960) - Max
- Dentist on the Job (1961) - Newsreader
- The Frightened City (1961) - Supt. Dave Carter
- Serena (1962) - Inspector Gregory
- Flight from Singapore (1962) - Squadron Leader Hill
- Night of the Prowler (1962) - Robert Langton
- Girl in the Headlines (1963) - Walbrook
- Guns at Batasi (1964) - Captain
- Genghis Khan (1965) - Kuchluk
- Thunderball (1965) - Group Captain Dawson (uncredited)
- The Fighting Prince of Donegal (1966)
- The Vulture (1967) - Jarvis, the butler
- Hammerhead (1968) - Huntzinger
- The Desperados (1969) - Haller
- The Magic Christian (1969) - Duke in Sotheby's
- Cromwell (1970) - Sir Thomas Lunsford
- No Blade of Grass (1970) - David Custance
- When Dinosaurs Ruled the Earth (1970) - Ammon
- Young Winston (1972) - Colonel Martin
- Psychomania (1973) - Sergeant
- Diamonds on Wheels (1974) - Steward
- The Amorous Milkman (1975) - Tom
- Legend of the Werewolf (1975) - Dignitary
- Let's Get Laid (1978) - The Commissioner
- The Wild Geese (1978) - Skyjacker
- The Sea Wolves (1980) - Barker
- Priest of Love (1981) - Arthur Lawrence
- The Whistle Blower (1987) - Irate Driver
- Playing Away (1987) - The Colonel
- Strike It Rich (1990) - Lecherous Man with Wink (final film role)
