= Brown Derby (actor) =

Scottish actor (1914–2000)

- Born: 5 May 1914; Castle Douglas, Kirkcudbrightshire, Scotland
- Died: 17 July 2000 (aged 86)
- Occupation: Actor

Brown Derby (5 May 1914 – 17 July 2000) was a Scottish stage, film and television actor. He made his film debut as Edith Evans's footman in Thorold Dickinson's classic The Queen of Spades (1949). He played Sergeant Roberts, too, in Suspended Alibi. Derby had a regular role as Scott-Erskine in the BBC's The Omega Factor, and also starred in Dr. Finlay's Casebook, Z-Cars, The Saint, Sutherland's Law, Play for Today, Take The High Road and many other British television shows.

== Theatre ==
Year	Title	Role	Company	Director	Notes
1971	Confessions of a Justified Sinner	Blanchard, Shepherd	Lyceum Theatre, Edinburgh	Richard Eyre	Edinburgh International Festival
1982	Ane Satyre of the Thrie Estaites	Merchant	Scottish Theatre Company	Tom Fleming	play by Sir David Lyndsay, adapted by Robert Kemp
