= I Cheated the Law =

1949 film by Edward L. Cahn

- Theatrical release poster
- Directed by: Edward L. Cahn
- Screenplay by: Richard G. Hubler
- Story by: Sam Baerwitz
- Produced by: Sam Baerwitz
- Starring: Tom Conway; Steve Brodie; Robert Osterloh; Barbara Billingsley; Russell Hicks; James Seay
- Cinematography: Jackson Rose
- Edited by: Arthur Hilton
- Music by: Edward J. Kay
- Production company: 20th Century Fox
- Distributed by: 20th Century Fox
- Release date: March 4, 1949
- Running time: 69 minutes
- Country: United States
- Language: English

I Cheated the Law is a 1949 American crime film directed by Edward L. Cahn and written by Richard G. Hubler. The film stars Tom Conway, Steve Brodie, Robert Osterloh, Barbara Billingsley, Russell Hicks and James Seay. The film was released on March 4, 1949, by 20th Century Fox. It received positive reviews from critics

== Plot ==
In court, criminal attorney John Campbell defends a man, Frank Bricolle, who is charged with murdering a night watchman in a fur warehouse during a robbery. Frank having saved his life during the war, John believes in him so much that both he and wife Ruth provide the defendant with an alibi, resulting in his acquittal.

Frank later confesses to John how he did indeed commit the crime, aided by Joe Corsi and other accomplices. John expresses regret for his actions and leaves Ruth, wanting to be alone for a while. He is actually busy scheming to frame Corsi for the murder. Corsi tries to avoid a conviction by accusing Bricolle in the courtroom, where Bricolle pulls a gun and tries to shoot his way out. He is killed, and John returns home to Ruth.

== Cast ==
- Tom Conway as John Campbell
- Steve Brodie as Frank Bricolle
- Robert Osterloh as Joe Corsi
- Barbara Billingsley as Ruth Campbell
- Russell Hicks as District Attorney Randolph
- James Seay as Rodd Simpson
- Chet Huntley as Himself
- Tommy Noonan as Sad Sam Carney
- William Gould as First Judge
- Harry Harvey, Sr. as Second Judge
- Garry Owen as Jerry
- Charles Wagenheim as Al Markham
