= The Counterfeit Plan =

1957 British film by Montgomery Tully

- Theatrical release poster
- Directed by: Montgomery Tully
- Written by: James Eastwood
- Produced by: Alec C. Snowden; Richard Gordon
- Starring: Zachary Scott; Peggie Castle
- Cinematography: Phil Grindrod
- Edited by: Geoffrey Muller
- Production company: Amalgamated Productions
- Distributed by: Warner Bros. Pictures
- Release date: 1 January 1957
- Running time: 80 minutes
- Country: United Kingdom
- Language: English

The Counterfeit Plan is a 1957 British crime film directed by Montgomery Tully and starring Zachary Scott and Peggie Castle. It was written by James Eastwood.

It was one of a number of crime films with imported stars made by Anglo Amalgamated.

== Plot summary ==
A gang of criminals, led by sociopath Max Brant, escape from France and set up a counterfeit operation to make British £5 and American $20 notes, in the cellar of a large English country house now owned by Louie Bernard. Brant forces Bernard, who worked for the British Government during WW2 making foreign counterfeit currency, to make the master die plates by holding his daughter, Carole an artist, as a hostage. When Bernard finds out that Brant has tried to rape his daughter and has killed his housekeeper, Gerta, because she witnessed the attempted rape, he anonymously posts one of the forged £5 notes to the police with a letter describing the counterfeit operation. When Brant is told about this by Duke, he confronts Bernard. Meanwhile, the police slowly close in on the gang's headquarters.

The film features professional snooker world champion Horace Lindrum in a cameo appearance playing himself. This is used as cover for one of the meetings with other criminals to discuss the sale of the forged British £5 notes to them. Another similar meeting is camouflaged as a boxing match.

== Cast ==
- Zachary Scott as Max Brant
- Peggie Castle as Carole Bernard
- Mervyn Johns as Louie Bernard
- Sydney Tafler as Harry Flint
- Lee Patterson as Duke
- Eric Pohlmann as Frank Wandelman
- Robert Arden as Bob Fenton
- Chili Bouchier as Gerta
- John Welsh as Police Inspector Grant
- Aubrey Dexter as Joe Lepton
- David Lodge as Sam Watson

== Production ==
The film was the first of three between Amalgamated Productions and Anglo-Amalgamated.

== Reception ==
According to Tom Weaver in The Horror Hits of Richard Gordon, the film was very popular in the UK.

The Monthly Film Bulletin wrote: "An uneven thriller marred by a dull script and some unskilful make-up, which has the effect of prematurely ageing several of the players, notably Peggie Castle. The scenes depicting the actual forgery processes are not without interest but are spoilt by constant repetition, and the contrived ending constitutes a poor anti-climax."

Picturegoer wrote: "The melodramatic trimmings are nonsense, the characterization cursory, despite astute performances from Scott, Mervyn Johns and Sydney Tafler."
