= Terence Fisher =

British film director and film editor (1904–1980)

- On the set of Frankenstein Must Be Destroyed
- Born: 23 February 1904; Maida Vale, County of London, England
- Died: 18 June 1980 (aged 76); Twickenham, London, England
- Occupations: Film director; film editor

Terence Fisher (23 February 1904 – 18 June 1980) was a British film director best known for his work for Hammer Films.

Fisher was the first director to bring gothic horror alive in full colour, and the sexual overtones and explicit horror in his films, while mild by modern standards, were unprecedented in his day. His first major gothic horror film was The Curse of Frankenstein (1957), which launched Hammer's association with the genre and made British actors Peter Cushing and Christopher Lee leading horror stars of the era. He went on to film several adaptations of classic horror subjects, including Dracula (1958), The Mummy (1959), and The Curse of the Werewolf (1961).

Given their subject matter and lurid approach, Fisher's films, though commercially successful, were largely dismissed by critics during his career. It is only in recent years that Fisher has become recognised as an auteur in his own right. His most famous films are characterised by a blend of fairytale myth and the supernatural alongside themes of sexuality, morality, and "the charm of evil", often drawing heavily on a conservative Christian outlook.

== Biography ==
=== Early life ===
Fisher was born in Maida Vale, London. He left school aged 16 and served in the Merchant Navy for five years. He first broke into the film industry as a clapper boy at Lime Grove Studios in Shepherd's Bush in 1933.

=== Editor ===
Fisher did his first work as an assistant editor in 1934. At Gainsborough Pictures he received his first editor credit on Tudor Rose (1936). Following this came Jack of All Trades (1936) for Robert Stevenson, and Where There's a Will (1936) and Windbag the Sailor (1936) for William Beaudine.

At Warner Bros Fisher edited Mr. Satan (1938), On the Night of the Fire (1939), Atlantic Ferry (1940), The Peterville Diamond (1941), and Flying Fortress (1942). Fisher did Tomorrow We Live (1943) and Candlelight in Algeria (1944) for British Aviation Films, They Met in the Dark (1943) for Marcel Hellman, The Dark Tower (1943) for Warners, and One Exciting Night (1944). Among his final films as editor were The Wicked Lady (1945), one of the most popular British films of the time, and Master of Bankdam (1947).

=== Early films as director ===
Fisher's first film as director was A Song for Tomorrow (1948), a second feature for Highbury Productions. For the same company he did Colonel Bogey (1948) and To the Public Danger (1948). These were low budget films, though Fisher moved over to Gainsborough for more prestigious movies: Portrait from Life (1948) with Mai Zetterling; Marry Me! (1949) with Derek Bond; The Astonished Heart (1950) with Noël Coward (replacing Michael Redgrave during filming); So Long at the Fair (1950) with Dirk Bogarde and Jean Simmons. Fisher returned to supporting features with Home to Danger (1951) for Eros Films.

Fisher's first feature for Hammer Films was The Last Page (1951), one of a number of low budget thrillers that studio were then making, usually with an imported American star to appeal to the US market; The Last Page featured George Brent and Diana Dors. Hammer liked Fisher's work and kept him on for Wings of Danger (1952) with Zachary Scott, and Stolen Face (1952) with Paul Henreid and Lizabeth Scott.

After making Distant Trumpet (1952) for Meridian Films, Fisher returned to Hammer for Mantrap (1953) with Henreid; Four Sided Triangle (1953) with Barbara Payton; Spaceways (1953), a science fiction story, with Howard Duff; Blood Orange (1953), a crime film with Tom Conway; Face the Music (1954) with Alex Nicol; Murder by Proxy (1954) with Dane Clark; and A Stranger Came Home (1954) with Paulette Goddard.

Fisher made Final Appointment (1954) outside Hammer with John Bentley then went back to Hammer for Mask of Dust (1954) with Richard Conte. He made the comedy Children Galore (1955) and the Final Appointment sequel Stolen Assignment (1955). Next came another movie with Bentley, The Flaw (1955) before he made two crime films, The Gelignite Gang (1956) and The Last Man to Hang? (1956). He was hired by Tempean Films to make a final crime thriller with an imported American star, Kill Me Tomorrow (1957) with Pat O'Brien.

During the 1950s Fisher also worked frequently in British television, directing episodes of series such as The Adventures of Robin Hood, Sword of Freedom and Dial 999.

=== Hammer Horror films ===
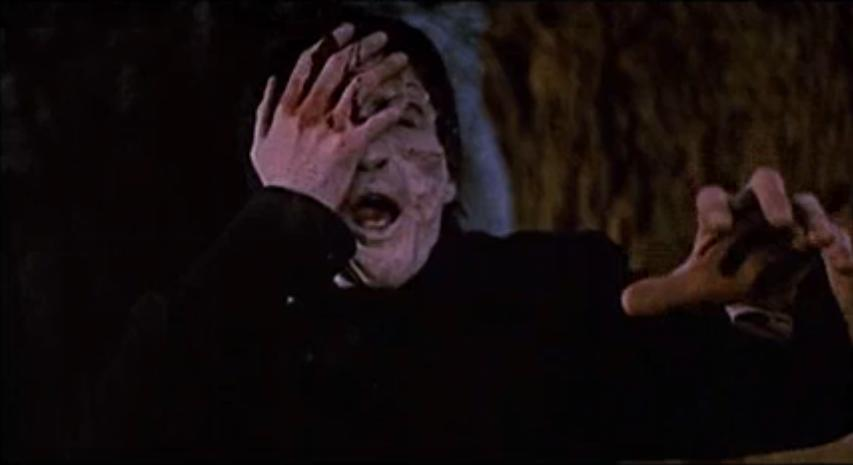
Christopher Lee as the creature in The Curse of Frankenstein (1957), a huge international success

Fisher's career changed direction permanently when Hammer asked him to direct The Curse of Frankenstein (1957), their first colour horror film. It was the company's most important project to date, and Fisher was hand-picked by Hammer management to helm the film as he had a reputation for reliability. Working from a script by Jimmy Sangster that re-imagined the lengthy original novel as a gruesome, morally ambiguous chamber piece, the film saw British TV star Peter Cushing cast as Baron Victor Frankenstein whilst the then little-known supporting actor Christopher Lee portrayed the Creature. It was a handsome-looking, quality production and an international box office smash; alarming British critics and raising the standard for what was acceptable in terms of on-screen violence and gore, the film established Hammer as a leading brand name in the British film industry.

Hammer had even more financial success with Fisher's second gothic horror film Dracula (1958), starring Lee in the title role and Cushing as his adversary Doctor Van Helsing. Once again reducing the scope of its source novel in line with Hammer's budgetary constraints, the screenplay minimised both the geographical settings and the number of characters, and the result was a compact, atmospheric and action-packed chiller in which Lee portrayed the figure of the vampire Count Dracula as having an animalistic sexuality that had never before been presented on screen. It is today regarded as a trailblazer in the horror film genre, the archetypal Hammer film, and the greatest of Fisher's directorial efforts.

For the rest of his career, Fisher worked almost exclusively within the horror genre. The Hound of the Baskervilles (1959), with Cushing, Lee, and André Morell was an adaptation of the famous Sherlock Holmes novel given a horror slant, whilst Cushing and Lee also starred in The Mummy (1959), a pastiche of the Universal Mummy movies of the 1940s. The Revenge of Frankenstein (1958), with Cushing and Francis Matthews, was a successful sequel to The Curse of Frankenstein, whilst The Man Who Could Cheat Death (1959) was a remake of The Man in Half Moon Street (1945), and featured Lee in a more heroic role than usual, opposite Anton Diffring. Fisher directed another hit sequel, The Brides of Dracula (1960), starring Cushing, Freda Jackson, Martita Hunt and David Peel, whilst The Two Faces of Dr. Jekyll (1960) had Paul Massie in the title role with Lee and Dawn Addams in support, but it was one of the first Hammer horrors to perform disappointingly at the box office.

Not all the films Fisher made for Hammer were gothic chillers; The Stranglers of Bombay (1959) was a different kind of horror, a tale of the thuggee cult in Imperial India starring Guy Rolfe and Allan Cuthbertson. Fisher had a change of pace when he directed Sword of Sherwood Forest (1960) for Hammer, with Richard Greene reprising his small screen role as Robin Hood from the ITV series on which he had previously worked with Fisher. Also featured in a supporting part was Oliver Reed shortly before Hammer cast him in the lead role of Fisher's The Curse of the Werewolf (1961). Then came The Phantom of the Opera (1962) starring Herbert Lom; it was one of Hammer's most expensive films but proved a relative commercial letdown, and following its release Fisher did not work for Hammer again for over two years.

=== Director for hire ===
German company CCC Film hired Fisher to make his first movie outside Hammer since 1957, Sherlock Holmes and the Deadly Necklace (1962), starring Lee as Holmes, but making the film was an unhappy experience for the director and it remains an obscurity. Lippert Pictures then employed Fisher for The Horror of It All (1963), a horror comedy starring Pat Boone, but it received poor reviews and was not a success.

Fisher finally worked for Hammer again when they reunited him with both Cushing and Lee for The Gorgon (1964), a personal favourite of the director, before Lippert used him once more for the black-and-white science fiction film The Earth Dies Screaming (1964), featuring American actor Willard Parker alongside Dennis Price and Fisher's close friend Thorley Walters.

Fisher directed another science fiction film, Island of Terror (1966), for Planet Film Productions, which starred Cushing alongside Edward Judd. Back at Hammer he worked on further entries to their most famous franchises, with Lee, Barbara Shelley and Andrew Keir starring in Dracula: Prince of Darkness (1966), whilst Frankenstein Created Woman (1967) once again featured Cushing. Fisher, Cushing and Lee then worked together on Planet's Night of the Big Heat (1967), adapted from a sci-fi story by John Lymington.

=== Final films ===
For Hammer, Fisher and Lee next made The Devil Rides Out (1968), from the novel by Dennis Wheatley, which is regarded as one of Fisher's best films, whilst Cushing starred in Frankenstein Must Be Destroyed (1969), which was conceived as a climax to the Frankenstein series.

After injuries sustained in a pair of road accidents resulted in lengthy periods of convalescence, Fisher returned to Hammer for the final time to make Frankenstein and the Monster from Hell (1974), which was to be his last film. A financial failure that was written off as being very much behind-the-times when it was first released, more recently the movie has been reappraised as a worthy and melancholic "last hurrah" for Fisher and Hammer's style of horror in general.

After several years in retirement, Fisher died in June 1980 at the age of 76.

== Filmography ==
The following is a list of the theatrical films in which Fisher received a screen credit.

=== As editor ===
1. Tudor Rose (1936) as T.R. Fisher
2. Where There's a Will (1936)
3. Jack of All Trades (1936) as Terry Fisher
4. Windbag the Sailor (1936)
5. Mr. Satan (1938)
6. On the Night of the Fire (1939) a.k.a. The Fugitive (US)
7. That's the Ticket (1940)
8. Atlantic Ferry (1941)
9. The Peterville Diamond (1942)
10. Flying Fortress (1942)
11. Tomorrow We Live (1943) a.k.a. At Dawn We Die (US)
12. They Met in the Dark (1943)
13. The Dark Tower (1943)
14. Candlelight in Algeria (1944)
15. One Exciting Night (1944)
16. The Wicked Lady (1945)
17. Master of Bankdam (1947)

=== As director ===
1. A Song for Tomorrow (1948)
2. Colonel Bogey (1948)
3. To the Public Danger (1948)
4. Portrait from Life (1948) a.k.a. Lost Daughter (US)
5. Marry Me! (1949)
6. The Astonished Heart (1950) co-director with Antony Darnborough
7. So Long at the Fair (1950) co-director with Antony Darnborough
8. Home to Danger (1951)
9. The Last Page (1952) a.k.a. Man Bait (US)
10. Wings of Danger (1952) a.k.a. Dead on Course (US)
11. Stolen Face (1952)
12. Distant Trumpet (1952)
13. Mantrap (1953) also as co-screenwriter, a.k.a. Man in Hiding (US)
14. Four Sided Triangle (1953) also as co-screenwriter
15. Spaceways (1953)
16. Blood Orange (1953) a.k.a. Three Stops to Murder (US)
17. Face the Music (1954) a.k.a. The Black Glove (US)
18. Murder by Proxy (1954) a.k.a. Blackout (US)
19. A Stranger Came Home (1954) a.k.a. The Unholy Four (US)
20. Final Appointment (1954) a.k.a. The Last Appointment (US)
21. Mask of Dust (1954) a.k.a. Race for Life (US)
22. Children Galore (1954)
23. Stolen Assignment (1955)
24. The Flaw (1955)
25. The Gelignite Gang (1956) a.k.a. The Dynamiters (US)
26. The Last Man to Hang? (1956)
27. The Curse of Frankenstein (1957)
28. Kill Me Tomorrow (1957)
29. Dracula (1958) a.k.a. Horror of Dracula (US)
30. The Revenge of Frankenstein (1958)
31. The Hound of the Baskervilles (1959)
32. The Mummy (1959)
33. The Man Who Could Cheat Death (1959)
34. The Stranglers of Bombay (1959)
35. The Two Faces of Dr. Jekyll (1960) a.k.a. Jekyll’s Inferno / House of Fright (US)
36. The Brides of Dracula (1960)
37. Sword of Sherwood Forest (1960)
38. The Curse of the Werewolf (1961)
39. The Phantom of the Opera (1962)
40. Sherlock Holmes and the Deadly Necklace (1962)
41. The Horror of It All (1963)
42. The Gorgon (1964)
43. The Earth Dies Screaming (1964)
44. Dracula: Prince of Darkness (1966)
45. Island of Terror (1966)
46. Frankenstein Created Woman (1967)
47. Night of the Big Heat (1967) a.k.a. Island of the Burning Damned (US)
48. The Devil Rides Out (1968) a.k.a. The Devil's Bride (US)
49. Frankenstein Must Be Destroyed (1969)
50. Frankenstein and the Monster from Hell (1974)

== Director credits (television) ==
Sources for this section include.

1. Rheingold Theatre (5 episodes) (1953–1955)
2. Colonel March of Scotland Yard (1 episode) (1955)
3. ITV Television Playhouse (1 episode) (1956)
4. Assignment Foreign Legion (2 episodes) (1956)
5. The Adventures of Robin Hood (11 episodes) (1956–1957)
6. Sword of Freedom (2 episodes) (1957–1958)
7. The Gay Cavalier (3 episodes) (1957)
8. The Adventures of Clint and Mac (1957)
9. Dial 999 (TV Series) (1958–1959)
10. The Mickey Mouse Club (2 episodes) (1958)
11. Target (1 episode) (1958)
