= Companions in Crime =

1963 British film by John Krish

- Australian daybill poster
- Directed by: John Krish
- Written by: Kenneth Hayles; Pat Latham (as Patricia Lathan); Lester Powell
- Produced by: William N. Boyle
- Starring: Clifford Evans
- Cinematography: Basil Emmott
- Edited by: John Seabourne
- Music by: Lambert Williamson
- Production companies: William N. Boyle Productions; Republic Productions (Great Britain) Ltd.
- Distributed by: Republic Pictures (U.S.)
- Release date: 1963
- Running time: 70 minutes
- Country: United Kingdom
- Language: English

Companions in Crime (also known as Stryker Strikes Twice) is a 1954 British crime film directed by John Krish and starring Clifford Evans, George Woodbridge and Kenneth Haigh. It was written by Kenneth Hayles, Patricia Lathan and Lester Powell, as a spin-off from the television series Stryker of the Yard, and features two cases originally transmitted as separate episodes: "The Case of the Two Brothers" and "The Case of the Black Falcon".

== Plot ==
Two cases for "Inspector Stryker". In the first case, the detective utilises the aid of young Martha to clear her fiancé, John Kendall, who has been falsely convicted of murder. In the second, Stryker is tipped off that a yachtsman is a jewel smuggler.

== Cast ==
- Clifford Evans as Chief Inspector Robert Stryker
- George Woodbridge as Sergeant Hawker
- Kenneth Haigh as John Kendall
- Maurice Kaufmann as Arnold Kendall
- Christine Silver as Mrs. Kendall
- Eliot Makeham as Councillor Sandford
- Dorothy Alison as Sheila Marsden

== Reception ==
The Monthly Film Bulletin wrote: "Two slight crime stories add up to an overlong picture which hasn't the material to justify its length. Unambitious direction and indifferent scripts add little to the simple, under-developed themes."

Kine Weekly wrote: "The picture keeps Stryker, competently portrayed by Clifford Evans, and his stooge, Sam, amusingly drawn by George Woodbridge, out of things during the initial stages, but they, nevertheless, come up fast on the rails and contribute to two exciting finishes. Rest of the players sound, and London and Thames backgrounds first rate. The two halves make a better than average whole."

Picturegoer wrote: "Split-second timing and no frills are the requirements for these package thrillers, designed for American commercial television. The stories here, though modest, are neat and competent."
