= Find the Lady (1956 film) =

British film by Charles Saunders

- Original trade ad
- Directed by: Charles Saunders
- Screenplay by: Kenneth Hayles
- Story by: Paul Erickson; Dermot Palmer
- Produced by: John Temple-Smith
- Starring: Donald Houston; Mervyn Johns; Beverly Brooks
- Cinematography: Brendan J. Stafford
- Edited by: Richard Sidwell
- Music by: Ray Terry; Philip Martell (musical director)
- Production companies: Major Productions; Act Productions
- Distributed by: J. Arthur Rank Film Distributors (UK)
- Release date: October 1956 (UK)
- Running time: 56 minutes
- Country: United Kingdom
- Language: English
- Budget: £12,000

Find the Lady is a 1956 British comedy thriller 'B' film directed by Charles Saunders and starring Donald Houston, Beverley Brooks and Mervyn Johns. It was written by Kenneth Hayles.

== Plot ==
During New Year's Eve, a young model spends the day searching for her godmother, who has suspiciously gone missing.

== Cast ==
- Donald Houston as Bill
- Beverley Brooks as June Weston
- Mervyn Johns as Hurst
- Kay Callard as Rita
- Maurice Kaufmann as Nicky
- Edwin Richfield as Max
- Moray Watson as Jimmy
- Ferdy Mayne as Tony Del Roma
- Anne Heywood as receptionist
- Nigel Green as photographer
- Enid Lorimer as Miss Rees (uncredited)

== Critical reception ==
The Monthly Film Bulletin wrote: "Intended presumably as a comedy thriller, Find the Lady lacks wit and is only intermittently exciting. It is difficult to decide from Beverly Brooks' performance whether the heroine is meant to be as empty-headed as she appears. Of the supporting cast, only Maurice Kaufman and Edwin Richfield manage to bring any conviction to their parts."

Kine Weekly wrote: "The picture tries to be humorous and Rififi like in turn, but sadly lacks finesse. Beverly Brooks pleases, despite an affected voice, as June, and Donald Houston makes the best of a ticklish job as Bill, but Mervyn Johns clumsily shows his hand as Mr. Hurst and Moray Watson flops as funny man Jimmy. The settings aren't bad, but the dialogue is as feeble as the plot."

In British Sound Films: The Studio Years 1928–1959 David Quinlan rated the film as "average", writing: "Neatly plotted comedy-thriller rather short on genuine humour."
