= The Voice (Australian Playhouse) =

- Australian Playhouse episode
- Episode no.: Season 1 Episode 21
- Teleplay by: Kenneth Hayles
- Original air date: 5 September 1966
- Running time: 30 mins

Episode chronology
| ← Previous "Ticket to Nowhere" | Next → "The Empty Day" |

"The Voice" is the 21st television play episode of the first season of the Australian anthology television series Australian Playhouse. "The Voice" was written by Kenneth Hayles and originally aired on ABC on 5 September 1966.

== Plot ==
Max Reagan is having an affair with Cathy, wife of his partner Don Garfield. It ends and eight years later Max returns to the Garfields with a gun demanding a debt be repaid.

== Cast ==
- Ed Devereaux as Max Reagan
- Ron Haddrick as Don Garfield
- Lyn James as Cathy
