= Maurice Kaufmann =

English actor (1927–1997)

- Born: Maurice Harington Kaufmann; 29 June 1927; Gorleston-on-Sea, Norfolk, England
- Died: 21 September 1997 (aged 70); London, England
- Occupation: Actor
- Years active: 1948–1997
- Spouse: Honor Blackman (m. 1961; div. 1975)
- Children: 2
- Relatives: Gillian Raine (cousin)

Maurice Harington Kaufmann (29 June 1927 – 21 September 1997) was an English actor of stage, film, and television, who specialised in whodunits and horror films.

== Personal life ==
He married Honor Blackman in 1961. They appeared together in the film, Fright (1971). They adopted two children, a daughter and a son, before divorcing in 1975.

== Death ==
Maurice Kaufmann died on 21 September 1997 in London from cancer, aged 70. He was nursed, on his deathbed, by his ex-wife, Honor Blackman.

== Selected filmography ==
- Appointment in London (1953) as RAF Officer (uncredited)
- The Angel Who Pawned Her Harp (1954) as Reg
- Beau Brummell (1954) as Lord Alvanley (uncredited)
- To Dorothy a Son (1954) as Elmer the Pianist
- Companions in Crime (1954) as Arnold Kendall
- Three Cases of Murder (1955) as Pemberton (segment "You Killed Elizabeth")
- The Love Match (1955) as Harry Longworth
- The Quatermass Xperiment (1955) as Marsh (uncredited)
- Secret Venture (1955) as Dan Flemying
- An Alligator Named Daisy (1955) as Ed (uncredited)
- Handcuffs, London (1955) as Jerry Strong
- Women Without Men (A.K.A.Blonde Bait (1956) as Daniels
- It's a Wonderful World (1956) as Paul Taylor
- Find the Lady (1956) as Nicky
- The Girl in the Picture (1957) as Rod Molloy
- The Man Without a Body (1957) as Chauffeur
- Fire Down Below (1957) as 3rd U.S. Sailor
- Date with Disaster (1957) as Don Redman
- Campbell's Kingdom (1957) as Man at Golden Calf
- The Big Money (1958) as Harry's Friend (uncredited)
- Behemoth, the Sea Monster (1959) as Mini Submarine Officer
- Life in Emergency Ward 10 (1959) as Anaesthetist
- Top Floor Girl (1959) as Peter Farnite
- The Crowning Touch (1959) as David
- Gorgo (1961) as Radio Reporter
- House of Mystery (1961) as Henry Trevor
- Tarnished Heroes (1961) as Tom Mason
- Play It Cool (1962) as Larry Granger
- On the Beat (1962) as Vince
- We Shall See (1964) as Evan Collins
- A Shot in the Dark (1964) as Pierre
- Fanatic (1965) as Alan Glentower
- Circus of Fear (1966) as Mario
- Cry Wolf (1969) as Jim Walker
- Man of Violence (1971) as Charles Grayson
- The Abominable Dr. Phibes (1971) as Dr. Whitcombe
- Bloomfield (1971) as Yasha
- Fright (1971) as Inspector
- The Vault of Horror (1973) as Bob Dickson (segment 5 "Drawn and Quartered")
- The Strange Case of the End of Civilization as We Know It (1977) as Steve McGarrett
