= Flight from Singapore =

1962 British film by Dudley Birch

- Theatrical release poster
- Directed by: Dudley Birch
- Written by: Dudley Birch
- Produced by: James Mellor
- Starring: Patrick Allen; Patrick Holt; William Abney
- Music by: Ken Jones
- Distributed by: Paramount British Pictures
- Release date: July 1962
- Running time: 74 mins
- Country: United Kingdom
- Language: English

Flight from Singapore is a 1962 British drama film directed and written by Dudley Birch and starring Patrick Allen, Patrick Holt and William Abney.

== Plot ==
After leaving the RAF, John Scott and his pal Smithy start an air service between Singapore and Hong Kong. A Chinese couple book a flight to Hong Kong for the birth of their first baby, and once airborne John and Smithy are asked to divert to pick up blood for a hospital. When the plane crash-lands during a monsoon, the RAF finds the crash-site and Sergeant Brooks and Squadron Leader Hill parachute down. Brooks helps to deliver the woman's premature baby, and John and Hill arrive with the blood at the hospital just in time.

== Cast ==
- Patrick Allen as John Scott
- Patrick Holt as Squadron Leader Hill
- William Abney as Flight Lieutenant Bob Elliott
- Harry Fowler as Sergeant Brooks
- Denis Holmes as Smithy
- Jane Jordan Rogers as Cleo
- Rosemary Dorken as Joan Elliott

== Reception ==
The Monthly Film Bulletin wrote: "Despite the familiar ingredients of storm and air crash, this film creates little or no suspense – particularly since the rescue plan goes "according to the book". It is altogether an unusually platitudinous affair, and some of the dialogue – particularly that assigned to the two women in the cast – verges on the ludicrous."

Kine Weekly wrote: "The direction is a little untidy and the principal players are a trifle self-conscious, but authentic RAF and hospital detail keep the film's end up. Far from lacking in feminine appeal, it'll get by with the not too demanding. Acceptable British 'second.' ... The picture, although made with the co-operation of the RAF, follows a loosely chanted course, while the plane crash is a pretty poor advertisement for private airlines."
