= Barbados Quest =

1955 British film by Bernard Knowles

- Original U.S. poster
- Directed by: Bernard Knowles
- Screenplay by: Kenneth Hayles
- Produced by: Robert S. Baker; Monty Berman
- Starring: Tom Conway; Delphi Lawrence; Brian Worth
- Cinematography: Monty Berman
- Edited by: Jack Slade
- Production companies: The Barbour Corporation Ltd. Cipa Productions (uncredited)
- Distributed by: RKO Radio Pictures
- Release date: July 1955 (UK)
- Running time: 70 minutes
- Country: United Kingdom
- Language: English

Barbados Quest (U.S. title: Murder On Approval) is a 1955 British crime drama film directed by Bernard Knowles and starring Tom Conway and Delphi Lawrence. It was written by Kenneth Hayles. Conway played the same role in a sequel, Breakaway (1955).

== Plot ==
An American philatelist pays £10,000 (£331,000 in 2023) for what he thinks is a rare postage stamp. After he becomes concerned of its authenticity, he employs detective Tom "Duke" Martin to investigate.

== Cast ==
- Tom Conway as Tom Martin
- Delphi Lawrence as Jean Larson
- Brian Worth as Geoffrey Blake
- Michael Balfour as Barney Wilson
- Campbell Cotts as Robert Coburn
- John Horsley as Det. Insp. Taylor
- Ronan O'Casey as Stefan Gordoni
- Launce Maraschal as J.D. Everleigh
- Colin Tapley as Lord Valchrist
- Alan Gifford as Henry Warburg
- Grace Arnold as Lady Hawksley
- John Colicos as mustachioed henchman (as John Collicos)
- Mayura as Yasmina
- John Watson as Detective Sgt. Grant
- Reggie Morris as clean-shaven henchman (as Reg Morris)
- Marianne Stone as Mrs. Wilson, cleaner
- Derrick Whittingham as print shop manager

== Critical reception ==
The Monthly Film Bulletin wrote: "This confused and rather tiresome production introduces Tom Conway in what may be the first of a series similar to his Falcon thrillers. The character of "The Duke" is scarcely distinguishable from the other; and his sophistication appears as spurious, and his humorous and romantic moments as irritating, as his predecessor's. Apart from a few "shock" cuts, the treatment is generally unadventurous, the earlier sequences in particular lacking action and variety. Among the supporting players, Michael Balfour wrings the utmost out of some miserable light relief."

Kine Weekly wrote: "The picture is far from crystal clear, but it packs widely assorted types into its plot and the brisk interplay of character, leading to spectacular gunplay, enables it to circumsvent flat spots. Tom Conway has an engaging manner and acts confidently as Duke, Delphi Lawrence disarms as the comely, yet unscrupulous, Jean, Brian Worth registers as Blake, and Michael Balfour amuses as Barney. The settings are suitably varied, the dialogue has an edge and the climax carries a kick."

TV Guide noted "An inept mystery."
