= Suspended Alibi =

1957 British film by Alfred Shaughnessy

- British quad poster
- Directed by: Alfred Shaughnessy
- Written by: Kenneth R. Hayles (as Kenneth Hayles); Robert Dunbar (additional scenes and dialogue); Alfred Shaughnessy (additional scenes and dialogue)
- Based on: original story by Kenneth R. Hayles (as Kenneth Hayles)
- Produced by: Robert Dunbar
- Starring: Patrick Holt; Honor Blackman; Valentine Dyall
- Cinematography: Peter Hennessy
- Edited by: Robert Jordan Hill (as Robert Hill)
- Production company: Act Films Ltd
- Distributed by: J. Arthur Rank (UK)
- Release date: February 1957 (UK)
- Running time: 64 minutes
- Country: United Kingdom
- Language: English

Suspended Alibi (U.S. title: Suspected Alibi) is a 1957 black and white British 'B' crime film directed by Alfred Shaughnessy and starring Patrick Holt, Honor Blackman and Lloyd Lamble. The film was produced by Robert Dunbar for Act Films Ltd.

== Plot ==
Paul Pearson is a married reporter who has been conducting a clandestine affair with another reporter, Diana. He tells his wife Lynn he is going to spend the evening playing cards with a friend, Bill Forrest, but he is going to see Diana to try to end their relationship, and asks Bill to provide him with an alibi should Lynn call. After Paul leaves Bill to go off to Diana, Bill argues with a neighbour, Waller, who stabs him during a scuffle. Bill later dies in hospital. When the police investigate, Diana, angry with Paul, denies that she has seen him recently. She is murdered, pushed out of her high window by the desperate Waller, but it looks as if she has jumped or fallen. Paul comes clean to the police in front of Lynn, but they don't believe him, and he is arrested for the crime, condemned by his own alibi, and sentenced to hang. Fortunately, his story is believed by Sandy Thorpe, a diligent crime reporter, who along with Lynn helps to fight Pearson's case.

== Cast ==
- Patrick Holt as Paul Pearson
- Honor Blackman as Lynn Pearson
- Valentine Dyall as Inspector Kayes
- Naomi Chance as Diana
- Lloyd Lamble as Waller
- Andrew Keir as Sandy Thorpe
- Frederick Piper as Mr. Beamster
- Viola Lyel as Mrs. Beamster
- Bryan Coleman as Bill Forrest
- Wally Patch as Porter
- Madoline Thomas as Granny
- Edgar Wreford as Prison Chaplain
- Brown Derby as Sergeant Roberts

== Critical reception ==
The Monthly Film Bulletin wrote: "Coincidence is stretched almost to breaking point in this conventional murder story, although the film is partially redeemed by some serviceable characterisation and efficient acting."

Kine Weekly wrote: "It crowds thrills, punctuated by a popular heart interest, into its convenient running time, yet ends on a happy note. Patrick Holt takes it on the chin gallantly as Paul, Honor Blackman and Naomi Chance score in contrast as Lynn and Diana, Lloyd Lamble is a nasty bit of work as Waller and Valentine Dyall impresses as a police inspector. Moreover, its backgrounds are constantly changing and dialogue is reduced to a minimum."

Britmovie called the film an "efficient thriller...undemanding yet fanciful b-movie crime drama crisply directed by Alfred Shaughnessy";

TV Guide noted "an okay crime drama that passes the time pleasantly."

Film historians Steve Chibnall and Brian McFarlane praise it as "much faster, more frantically and densely plotted than most 'B' movies. The familiar race-against-the-clock to save the condemned man produces some well-sustained tension, and, if the ending is never in serious doubt, Shaughnessy's brisk storytelling and Robert Hill's editing sustain interest in the crowded narrative."
