= Final Appointment =

1954 British film by Terence Fisher

- Lobby card
- Directed by: Terence Fisher
- Written by: Kenneth Hayles
- Based on: the BBC radio play Death Keeps a Date by Sidney Nelson & Maurice Harrison
- Produced by: Francis Searle
- Starring: John Bentley; Eleanor Summerfield; Hubert Gregg
- Cinematography: Jonah Jones
- Edited by: John Ferris
- Production company: ACT Films
- Distributed by: Monarch Film Corporation
- Release date: 11 October 1954
- Running time: 65 minutes
- Country: United Kingdom
- Language: English

Final Appointment (U.S. title: The Last Appointment) is a 1954 British second feature ('B') comedy thriller film directed by Terence Fisher, and starring John Bentley, Eleanor Summerfield and Hubert Gregg. It also features Arthur Lowe, later to become famous for his portrayal of Captain Mainwaring in Dad's Army, in an early role. The film was produced by Francis Searle for ACTFilms. A sequel, Stolen Assignment, also featuring sleuthing journalists Mike Billings and Jenny Drew, was released the following year.

== Plot ==
A former soldier who was court-martialled during the Second World War sets out to murder the officers who passed sentence on him. After the lawyer who acted for the prosecution at the court martial receives threatening letters, a newspaper reporter and his wisecracking girlfriend try to track down the killer.

== Cast ==
- John Bentley as Mike Billings
- Eleanor Summerfield as Jenny Drew
- Hubert Gregg as Hartnell
- Liam Redmond as Inspector Corcoran
- Meredith Edwards as Tom Martin
- Jean Lodge as Laura Robens
- Sam Kydd as Vickery
- Charles Farrell as Percy
- Peter Bathurst as Harold Williams
- Arthur Lowe as Barratt
- Gerald Case as Australian official
- Jessica Cairns as War Office typist
- Tony Hilton as Jimmy
- Henry de Bray as restaurant manager
- John Watson as police sergeant

== Production ==
The film was shot at Walton Studios outside London.

== Critical reception ==
The Monthly Film Bulletin wrote: "Formula crime melodrama, in which a clever young journalist solves a crime in the intervals of exchanging back-chat with his reporter girl friend and a police inspector."

Kine Weekly described the film as an "inconsequential crime melodrama."

The Radio Times gave the film two out of five stars, calling it a "capable thriller."
