= Blood Orange (1953 film) =

Crime drama by Terence Fisher

- U.S. theatrical release poster
- Directed by: Terence Fisher
- Screenplay by: Jan Read
- Produced by: Michael Carreras
- Starring: Tom Conway; Mila Parély; Naomi Chance; Michael Ripper
- Cinematography: Walter J. Harvey; Don Aton
- Edited by: Maurice Rootes
- Music by: Ivor Slaney
- Production company: Hammer Film Productions
- Distributed by: Exclusive Films (UK); Astor (US)
- Release date: 10 October 1953
- Running time: 76 minutes
- Country: United Kingdom
- Language: English

Blood Orange (U.S. title: Three Stops to Murder) is a 1953 British crime drama directed by Terence Fisher and starring Tom Conway and Mila Parély. The screenplay was by Jan Read. J. Elder Wills was art director, Phil Leakey Makeup, and Jimmy Sangster was assistant director. Filming began on March 16, 1953, and the film was released on Oct. 10, 1953. Most reviewers commented on how uneventful the film was, which is surprising given its extremely complex plot.

== Plot ==
In a London fashion house, "Blood Orange" is the name of a new dress designed by Helen Pascall. A model and a rich client are found murdered, each wearing the new dress. Private Eye Tom Conway and his employer Mr. Mercedes suspect a link between the murders and the jewel robberies they have been investigating. What follows is a very complicated "whodunit" involving multiple suspects.

== Cast ==
- Tom Conway as Tom Conway
- Mila Parély as Helen Pascall
- Naomi Chance as Gina
- Eric Pohlmann as Mr Mercedes
- Andrew Osborn as Captain Colin Simpson
- Richard Wattis as Detective Inspector MacLeod
- Margaret Halstan as Lady Marchant
- Eileen Way as Mme Fernande
- Michael Ripper as Eddie
- Betty Cooper as Miss Betty
- Thomas Heathcote as Detective Sergeant Jessup
- Alan Rolfe as Inspector
- Roger Delgado as Marlowe
- Reed De Rouen as Heath
- Delphi Lawrence as Chelsea
- Ann Hanslip as Jane
- Cab Kaye, singing "Don't Talk About Me Baby"

== Critical reception ==
Monthly Film Bulletin said "This thriller sets its involved story in the world of the couturiers, with back-biting models, a jealous manageress, and a heroine who attempts to achieve her ambitions through murder. The film tries, not very successfully, to be crisp and smart in style; the mystery, however, is fairly well sustained."

In British Sound Films: The Studio Years 1928–1959 David Quinlan rated the film as "average", writing: "Thriller is smartly styled but low-cut in excitement."

Chibnall and McFarlane in The British 'B' Film called the film "competent but conventional mystery".

Sky Movies gave the film two out of five stars, and wrote: "This one is smartly styled but shorter than a mini-skirt when it comes to thrills."
