= The Hideout (1956 film) =

1956 film by Peter Graham Scott

Hideout
- Theatrical release poster
- Directed by: Peter Graham Scott
- Screenplay by: Kenneth Hayles
- Produced by: John Temple-Smith
- Starring: Dermot Walsh; Rona Anderson; Ronald Howard
- Cinematography: Brendan J. Stafford
- Edited by: Richard Sidwell
- Music by: Ray Terry
- Production company: Major Productions
- Release date: 24 December 1956
- Running time: 57 minutes
- Country: United Kingdom
- Language: English

The Hideout (also known as The Hide-Out) is a 1956 British crime film directed by Peter Graham Scott and starring Dermot Walsh, Rona Anderson and Ronald Howard. It was produced as a second feature ('B' film) by John Temple-Smith. The screenplay was by Kenneth Hayles.

== Plot ==
Insurance investigator Steve Curry accidentally picks up a case of bank notes. He discovers that the case belongs to Helen Grant, who runs a fur business with her brother Robert. The money is for payment to an escaped convict who has smuggled a consignment of Persian lamb skins from a crook named Zacki. It transpires that the furs are disease-ridden. Pursuing Zacki to his hide-out, Robert is murdered and the money stolen by Steve's friend Tim Bowers.

== Cast ==
- Dermot Walsh as Steve Curry
- Rona Anderson as Helen Grant
- Ronald Howard as Robert Grant
- Sam Kydd as Tim Bowers
- Howard Lang as Greeko
- Edwin Richfield as teacher
- Arnold Diamond as Zacki
- Trevor Reid as Fraser
- Richard Shaw as Joe
- Tommy Clegg as Vince
- Jessica Cairns as Julie
- Frank Hawkins as Inspector Ryan
- Jack Taylor as Sergeant Peters
- Angela Krefeld as bar hostess

== Production ==
The film was shot at Shepperton Studios. Scott says it was made for £12,000 and sold to Rank for £15,000.

== Reception ==
The Monthly Film Bulletin wrote: "Furs with anthrax lesions provide a slight variation on a familiar theme; otherwise, this British thriller follows a predictable course, playing and direction being unexceptional."

Kine Weekly wrote: "The picture, wholesome blood-and-thunder, quickly slips into top gear and, although it frequently covers bumpy ground, maintains its brisk initial pace until the end. Dermot Walsh makes an eager and forthright Steve, Rona Anderson is an attractive Helen and Ronald Howard looks shamefaced (and not without reason) as Robert. The supporting types, too, register. Its love interest develops logically and the camera is used to advantage."

The German website Der.Film.Noir.de wrote: "The Hide-Out was clearly made in the film noir tradition from the USA. It's a mediocre B-film at best, which you can safely skip as a cineaste, but which a connoisseur of British classic films won't be particularly annoyed about."
