= Stolen Assignment =

1955 British film by Terence Fisher

- Theatrical release poster
- Directed by: Terence Fisher
- Written by: Kenneth Hayles
- Story by: Sidney Nelson; Maurice Harrison
- Produced by: Francis Searle
- Starring: John Bentley
- Cinematography: Walter J. Harvey (as Jimmy Harvey)
- Edited by: John Pomeroy
- Production company: Association of Cinema Technicians (A.C.T.)
- Distributed by: British Lion Film Corporation (UK)
- Release date: August 1955 (UK)
- Running time: 62 min.
- Country: United Kingdom
- Language: English

Stolen Assignment is a 1955 British comedy 'B' film directed by Terence Fisher and starring John Bentley and Hy Hazell. It was written by Kenneth Hayles from a story by Sidney Nelson and Maurice Harrison, and produced by Francis Searle for Act Films Ltd. It was a sequel to Fisher's Final Appointment (1954), featuring sleuthing journalists Mike Billings and Jenny Drew.

== Cast ==
- John Bentley as Mike Billings
- Hy Hazell as Jenny Drew
- Eddie Byrne as Inspector Corcoran
- Patrick Holt as Henry Crossley
- Joyce Carey as Ida Garnett
- Kay Callard as Stella Watson
- Violet Gould as Mrs. Hudson
- Jessica Cairns as Marilyn Dawn
- Charles Farrell as Percy Simpson
- Michael Ellison as Danny Hudson
- Desmond Rayner as John Smith
- Graham Stuart as coroner
- Frank Forsyth as Dr Roberts
- Clement Hamelin as Seth Makepeace
- John Watson as plain clothes detective
- Raymond Rollett as desk sergeant

== Critical reception ==
The Monthly Film Bulletin wrote: "Comedy thriller with a fragile plot and a rather heavy-handed line in humour. To their credit, the players do what they can with the undemanding material to hand."

Kine Weekly wrote: "Subtlety is not its strong suit, but its keen sense of humour, shrewdly cultivated by its co-stars and director, sees it through. Clean fun, if not a great thriller, it will register with most audiences. Reliable British support."

The Daily Film Renter wrote: "Terence Fisher brings a lighthearted touch to bear from the directorial end and the laughs come plentifully. Likewise the cast takes its uncomplicated dialogue and situations well in its stride."

In British Sound Films: The Studio Years 1928–1959 David Quinlan rated the film as "poor", writing: "Comedy-thriller would have done better to stick to the thrills; pretty bad."
