= A Night of Adventure =

1944 film by Gordon Douglas

- Directed by: Gordon Douglas
- Screenplay by: Crane Wilbur
- Based on: A Hat, a Coat, a Glove; 1934 play by Wilhelm Speyer
- Produced by: Herman Schlom
- Starring: Tom Conway; Audrey Long
- Cinematography: Frank Redman
- Edited by: Les Millbrook
- Music by: Leigh Harline
- Distributed by: RKO
- Release date: June 9, 1944
- Running time: 65 minutes
- Country: United States
- Language: English

A Night of Adventure is a 1944 American crime mystery film directed by Gordon Douglas. It stars Tom Conway, Audrey Long, and Edward Brophy.

== Plot ==
Successful attorney Mark Latham neglects his wife, Erica, so she leaves him. Mark tries to win her back, but finds that she is now dating Tony Clair, an artist.

Julie Arden, jealous and upset that boyfriend Tony is stepping out on her, intends to shoot him in his apartment. Mark, who is there to confront Tony, wrestles away the gun, which goes off and kills her. An eyewitness mistakes Mark in a dark hallway for Tony, who is arrested and charged with the crime. Erica pleads with Mark to defend Tony in court.

As the trial proceeds, witnesses begin to realize that it was Mark, the attorney, and not the defendant who was in the hallway that night. He even shows that a pair of Tony's gloves fit himself. The gloves fit, the jury acquits, and Erica, realizing how clever her husband is, returns to him.

== Cast ==
- Tom Conway as Mark
- Audrey Long as Erica
- Louis Borel as Tony
- Edward Brophy as Steve
- Jean Brooks as Julie
- Emory Parnell as Judge

== Production ==
The film was based on a play that had been filmed in 1934 as Hat, Coat, and Glove.

== Reception ==
Variety called it "slow moving" although it praised the acting.

== See also ==
- List of American films of 1944
