= Passport to Treason =

1956 British film by Robert S. Baker

- Directed by: Robert S. Baker; Lance Comfort (original director)
- Screenplay by: Kenneth Hayles; Norman Hudis
- Based on: novel by Paddy Manning O'Brine
- Produced by: Robert S. Baker
- Starring: Rod Cameron; Lois Maxwell; Clifford Evans
- Cinematography: Monty Berman
- Edited by: Henry Richardson
- Music by: Stanley Black
- Production company: Mid-Century Film Productions
- Distributed by: Eros Films (UK)
- Release date: June 1956 (UK)
- Running time: 80 minutes
- Country: United Kingdom
- Language: English

Passport to Treason is a 1956 British second feature mystery thriller directed by Robert S. Baker and starring Rod Cameron, Lois Maxwell, and Clifford Evans. It was written by Kenneth R. Hayles and Norman Hudis, based on the Manning O'Brine novel of the same name.

== Plot ==
After the death of a friend, private investigator Mike O'Kelly investigates an organisation that claims to be working for world peace, but turns out to be a front for a crime syndicate.

== Cast ==
- Rod Cameron as Mike O'Kelly
- Lois Maxwell as Diane Boyd
- Clifford Evans as Orlando Syms
- Peter Illing as Giorgio Sacchi
- Marianne Stone as Miss 'Jonesy' Jones
- Douglas Wilmer as Dr. Randolph
- John Colicos as Pietro
- Ballard Berkeley as Inspector Thredgold
- Andrew Faulds as Barrett
- Barbara Burke as Katrina
- Derek Sydney as Amedeo Sacchi
- Trevor Reid as McCombe
- Neil Wilson as Sergeant Benson
- Peter Swanwick as cafe proprietor
- Hal Osmond as club barman
- Salvin Stewart as travel agency manager
- Anthony Baird as nursing home orderly
- Tom Bowan as bargee

== Critical reception ==
Monthly Film Bulletin said "Opening with the private detective wandering through a London fog, this thriller goes on to introduce the corpse (stabbed) clutching the book with a vital clue, the private nursing home equipped with a good stock of "truth drug," the equivocally placed heroine, and the gun battle in a dockside warehouse. Such classic situations, here presented earnestly but humourlessly, make up a fairly routine melodrama."

Kine Weekly wrote: "Hearty espionage melodrama ... Vigorously portrayed and realistically staged, it'll keep the crowd on the qui vive. Cast- iron British thick ear."

Picturegoer wrote: "Rod Cameron, fhe Western he-man, made the trip to England to star in this espionage melodrama, set in London. Was his journey necessary? Yes!"

Variety wrote: "Passport to Treason is a run-of-the-mill British whodunit with little to recommend it for the American market ... story line is blurry and frequently burdened by incomprehensible English dialog. ... Baker's direction doesn't help."

Leslie Halliwell said: "Stock melodramatic situations straightforwardly presented make this a watchable support."

In British Sound Films: The Studio Years 1928–1959 David Quinlan rated the film as "average", writing: "Resolute thriller reminiscent of the late 1930s."

The Radio Times Guide to Films gave the film 1/5 stars, writing: "Western star Rod Cameron should never have packed his passport to play the private eye in this dire British B-feature with its sub-Hitchcockian plot about neo-fascists in London concealing their activities within an organisation for world peace. A better actor than granite-jawed Cameron might have breathed some life into the line-up of hackneyed situations."
