= The Horror of It All =

1964 British horror comedy movie by Terence Fisher

- Theatrical release poster
- Directed by: Terence Fisher
- Written by: Ray Russell
- Starring: Pat Boone; Erica Rogers; Dennis Price
- Cinematography: Arthur Lavis
- Edited by: Robert Winter
- Music by: Douglas Gamley
- Production company: Lippert Pictures
- Distributed by: 20th Century Fox
- Release date: 19 August 1964
- Running time: 75 minutes
- Country: United Kingdom
- Language: English

The Horror of It All is a 1964 British horror comedy film directed by Terence Fisher and starring Pat Boone and Erica Rogers. The screenplay was by Ray Russell.

In the US, the film was distributed on the bottom half of a double bill with Witchcraft, starring Lon Chaney, Jr. and Jack Hedley. Both films peaked at No. 10 at the box office.

== Plot ==
American encyclopedia salesman Jack Robinson arrives at a dilapidated mansion in the English countryside, which belongs to the Marley family. Robinson has fallen in love with Cynthia and wants to ask permission to marry her.

Cynthia's family includes: her uncle Percival, an inventor; her cousin Natalia, a macabre, vampire-like creature; Cornwallis, a hammy ex-actor; her uncle Reginald; Grandfather, who lies bedridden upstairs; and cousin Muldoon, who is kept locked up in the fear that he will harm someone.

A cousin of Cynthia has just died and Cornwallis dies after drinking a toast. Jack wants to get the police but they are 20 mi (32 km) away and the family have no car (Jack's has broken down).

Several attempts are made on Jack's life. He learns that the family fortune consists of one million dollars, and one of the Marleys intends to end up with all of it. Later, grandpa is killed.

Jack and Cynthia make a dash for freedom and Cynthia reveals that she is the murderer. She conks out Jack.

In the hospital, Jack discovers that Cynthia made up the confession to protect him. The real killer is revealed to be Cornwallis, who was pretending to be dead.

== Cast ==
- Pat Boone as John Robinson
- Erica Rogers as Cynthia Marley
- Dennis Price as Cornwallis Marley
- Andrée Melly as Natalie Marley
- Valentine Dyall as Reginald Marley
- Archie Duncan as Muldoon Marley
- Erik Chitty as Grandpa Marley
- Jack Bligh as Percival Marley
- Oswald Laurence as doctor

== Production ==
The film was made at Shepperton Studios in England. The story is essentially a remake of the classic Universal Studios comedy horror film The Old Dark House (1932), which had already been remade in 1963. The plot also has elements of the horror comedy Murder, He Says (1945).

== Reception ==
The Monthly Film Bulletin wrote: "There are some engaging ideas in this burlesque, but they lie buried fathoms deep beneath an inept script and dispirited direction. Muldoon, for instance, two weeks a prisoner of headhunters, suffers from the delusion that his head has been shrunk to the size of an apple, but turns out disappointingly to be just another madman in the cellar: and in general the blood-and-thunder is merely a matter of a tarantula in the bed, descending ceiling, and Grandpapa murdered by out-of-reach medicine. The one positive enjoyment in the film is Andree Melly, made up to look like something reminiscent of the Witch of Endor and delivering every line with fine overtones of vampirism."

Variety wrote: "Director Terence Fisher and cast of The Horror of It All tried to play this Robert L. Lippert production for laughs, but they didn't pull it off. The filmed-in-England feature is a weak mixture of unfunny gags and standard horror situations that get laughs, when they aren't supposed to. ... There's Valentine Dyall who is creepy and speaks in Lugosi-like tones: Andree Melly has long fingernails and likes blood; Archie Duncan is kept locked in a padded cell: Jack Bligh is an inventor 50 years too late, having just discovered the electric light and put together a horseless carriage. The only normal member of the clan other than Miss Rogers is the Grandpapa, played by Erik Chitty, who reads Playboy in his sickbed. All this probably seemed amusing on paper, but it doesn't jell as, one by one, the family members get killed off, until an improbable climax is reached. Perhaps a team of top comedy writers could have made something here, but it didn't happen."

The Los Angeles Times wrote that Fisher "had the right idea playing the silly plot for laughs but his snail's pace spoils the show. He kills much of the humour by holding a scene after he's made his point."

According to Diabolique magazine "The movie is populated by a fine supporting cast of English character actors playing various eccentrics [...] Boone is a solid straight man, and the film is lively. It's not up to something like The Cat and the Canary (1939) which it was clearly aping, but those films are harder to do than they look. It's not bad. It could have done with color and songs."
