= Amalgamated Productions =

Amalgamated Productions was a film company established by Richard Gordon in association with Charles F. "Chuck" Vetter Jr., in the 1950s. They made a series of films in England. The first seven were crime films mostly using American stars and stories transplanted to England.

== Selected filmography ==
- Assignment Redhead (1956)
- The Crooked Sky (1957)
- Kill Me Tomorrow (1957)
- West of Suez (1957)
- The Counterfeit Plan (1957)
- Man in the Shadow a.k.a. Violent Stranger (1957)
- Escapement (1958)
- The Haunted Strangler (1958)
- Corridors of Blood (1958)
- Fiend Without a Face (1958)
- First Man into Space (1959)
