= The Flaw (1955 film) =

British film by Terence Fisher

- Opening titles
- Directed by: Terence Fisher
- Screenplay by: Brandon Fleming
- Story by: Brandon Fleming
- Produced by: Brandon Fleming; Geoffrey Goodheart
- Starring: John Bentley; Donald Houston; Rona Anderson
- Cinematography: Cedric Williams
- Edited by: Carmen Belaieff
- Music by: Gerrey Levey
- Production company: Cybex Film Productions Ltd.
- Distributed by: Renown Pictures Corporation (UK)
- Release date: October 1955 (UK)
- Running time: 61 minutes
- Country: United Kingdom
- Language: English

The Flaw is a 1955 British second feature crime film directed by Terence Fisher, and starring John Bentley and Donald Houston. The story and screenplay were by Brandon Fleming.

It is a remake of the 1933 film of the same name. A racing car driver plots to murder his wealthy wife, but reckons without the interventions of the family lawyer.

== Plot ==
A Formula One motor race is won by Paul Oliveri who is greeted by his girlfriend Monica after the race. A year later, Paul proposes to Monica on the balcony and she says yes as long as he gives up motor racing. Monica writes to her old boyfriend John (Jack) Millway, who is also her solicitor, to let her know she has married, and he is clearly disappointed. Paul and Jack meet each other at the wedding reception. Jack, who is still attracted to Monica, is uneasy at the reception and leaves early.

At their house, Paul allows Monica to catch him writing his will, which turns out to be part of his scheme. She decides to do likewise, and Paul persuades her not to tell her solicitor. They ask the butler and housekeeper to witness their signatures.

At his office, Jack contacts an enquiry agent to check on Paul. Within a year of the wedding, Paul is having an affair with a woman who gambles. At the same time, Paul is having his wife followed. Jack tells her of the affair. Monica is from a rich family and has given Paul nearly £20,000 in the first year. She also discloses that Paul plans to take her abroad to a mountainous area, even though he knows she is afraid of heights. Jack advises her not to go away with him under any circumstances. That night, Monica confronts Paul and tells him she is not going away. She reveals to him that she is not going to give him £2000 that he has asked for and will be giving to his mistress. She tells Paul she knows of his affair. She says she is leaving him and going to "South Haven," a seaside town.

Paul goes alone to a theatre in London's West End where a popular show is on. He makes a fuss about changing his booked seat at the box office and is sure he is noticed. He goes to the theatre bar, again making a display, but then circles back and leaves. He intercepts Jack, who is leaving his bridge club, and invites him back to his house for a talk. Paul starts speculating about how he could kill Jack, to get him out of the way. When Jack appears unwell and tries to leave, Paul then says he has poisoned Jack's drink and explains how he will dispose of the body. He tells him his body will never be found. Jack demands to be allowed to leave, but he seems too weak.

Paul says he has already murdered someone the same way: an inconvenient business partner in Montevideo. He explains how he plans to kill Monica. Jack apparently dies, with his last words There's a flaw. After a visit to a club to strengthen his alibi, Paul returns home and puts Jack's body in his car.

Paul drives to the seaside home where Monica and her maid are staying. He lies to Monica saying he is not upset about her being with another man and promises to do what he can to make it happy. He seems to Monica like his old, loving self. Paul needs to drag Jack's body from the car across the beach to a rowing boat and then on to Paul's main boat, while being careful no one is observing. However, once on the boat Jack reveals he is alive after all. He reveals he didn't take the poison, but dumped it while Paul's back was turned. Jack was in intelligence during the war, and in fact has reasoned a superior scheme if he wished to murder Paul. They fight in the cabin and then again on the deck. Paul trips over a rope, knocks his head, and falls in the sea. Jack tries to help him, but Paul has gone. Though it looks as though Jack could have murdered Paul, the police decline to prosecute: Scotland Yard has been on Paul's trail for the poisoning of his business partner in Montevideo.

== Cast ==
- John Bentley as Paul Oliveri
- Donald Houston as John (Jack) Millway
- Rona Anderson as Monica Oliveri (née Monica Cruson)
- Tonia Bern as Vera
- Doris Yorke as Mrs. Bower
- J. Trevor Davies as Sir George Bentham
- Cecilia Cavendish as Lady Bentham
- Vera Mechechnie as Nancy
- Ann Sullivan as Enid
- June Dawson as Mrs Kelver
- Langley Howard as Harman
- Gerry Levey as night club singer
- Herbert St. John as theatre manager
- Christine Bocca as box-office girl
- Derek Barnard as commissionaire
- Andrew Leigh as old theatregoer
- Eric Aubrey as young man

== Production ==
The film was produced by Cybex at the old Brighton Film Studios and includes location filming in both London and Shoreham.

== Critical reception ==
The Monthly Film Bulletin said: "Routine crime thriller, with John Bentley and Donald Houston adequately contrasted as the attractive and sinister Oliveri and the reliable Millway. The story has its moments of excitement, although the treatment is far from subtle."

Kine Weekly wrote: "Polished, yet stoutly carpentered vest-pocket crime melodrama. ... The film keeps moving and gay night club, lush apartment and picturesque seaside backgrounds give colour to its salient situations. John Bentley thoroughly convinces as villain Paul, Donald Houston is a dour John and Rona Anderson looks attractive as the checkered Monica. The dialogue is natural, while the expertly timed scene in which John springs to life paves the way to the salutary and showmanlike finale."

The Radio Times Guide to Films gave the film 1/5 stars, writing: "Director Terence Fisher, best known for his work at Hammer films, does all that can be expected with this ominously titled thriller starring John Bentley. Well-cast as a sinisterly suave racing driver, Bentley easily upstages Donald Houston, who is the lawyer trying to thwart Bentley's plans to bump off his wealthy wife, Rona Anderson. The feeble script betrays the fact this is pure B-fodder, remade from a 1933 film."

In British Sound Films: The Studio Years 1928–1959 David Quinlan rated the film as "mediocre", writing: " Apart from the odd directorial touch and the three stars, very amateurish."
