= Long Quarry Point =

Headland on the south coast of Devon, England

- Promontory
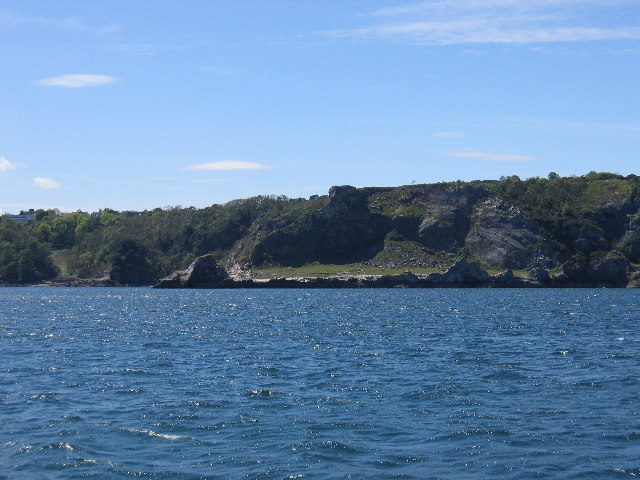
- Long Quarry Point from the sea

- Location within Devon
- Coordinates: 50.475935°N 3.497739°W
- Location: Torquay
- Geology: Limestone

Long Quarry Point is a coastal promontory below Wall's Hill in Torquay, Devon, England. The site is part of the Hope's Nose to Wall's Hill Site of Special Scientific Interest.

== Description ==
Long Quarry Point consists of a large disused quarry. There are steep limestone cliffs at the rear of the quarry, where there is also a substantial quantity of boulders and rock rubble. The floor of the quarry is mostly colonised by grass and wild plants. Along the edges of the quarry there are several rock pinnacles and boat mooring points with original metal mooring posts still fixed into the rock. The Point itself consists of one of these rock pinnacles.

The quarry can be reached by land or sea. An exposed zig-zagging path leads to the quarry floor from Wall's Hill, moving through a small wooded area and following the edge of the cliff to the bottom.

== Geology ==
The area displays the type section of the Devonian Walls Hill Limestone. It is considered to be unique in displaying the development of a Stromatoporoid reef through its fossil remains.

== History ==
The Point is the site of a large, disused limestone quarry (called Long Quarry), worked extensively during the 19th century. Stone from the quarry was used in numerous local building projects, with some stone being of sufficient quality to produce marble.

== Climbing ==
The quarry walls and cliffs constitute a significant climbing venue. There are numerous deep-water soloing routes including The Long Traverse (graded 4c) along with many sport climbing routes on the quarry walls and slabs. There are also a number of traditional climbing routes including those of the Grey Tower at the back of the quarry.
