= Tom Conway =

British actor (1904–1967)

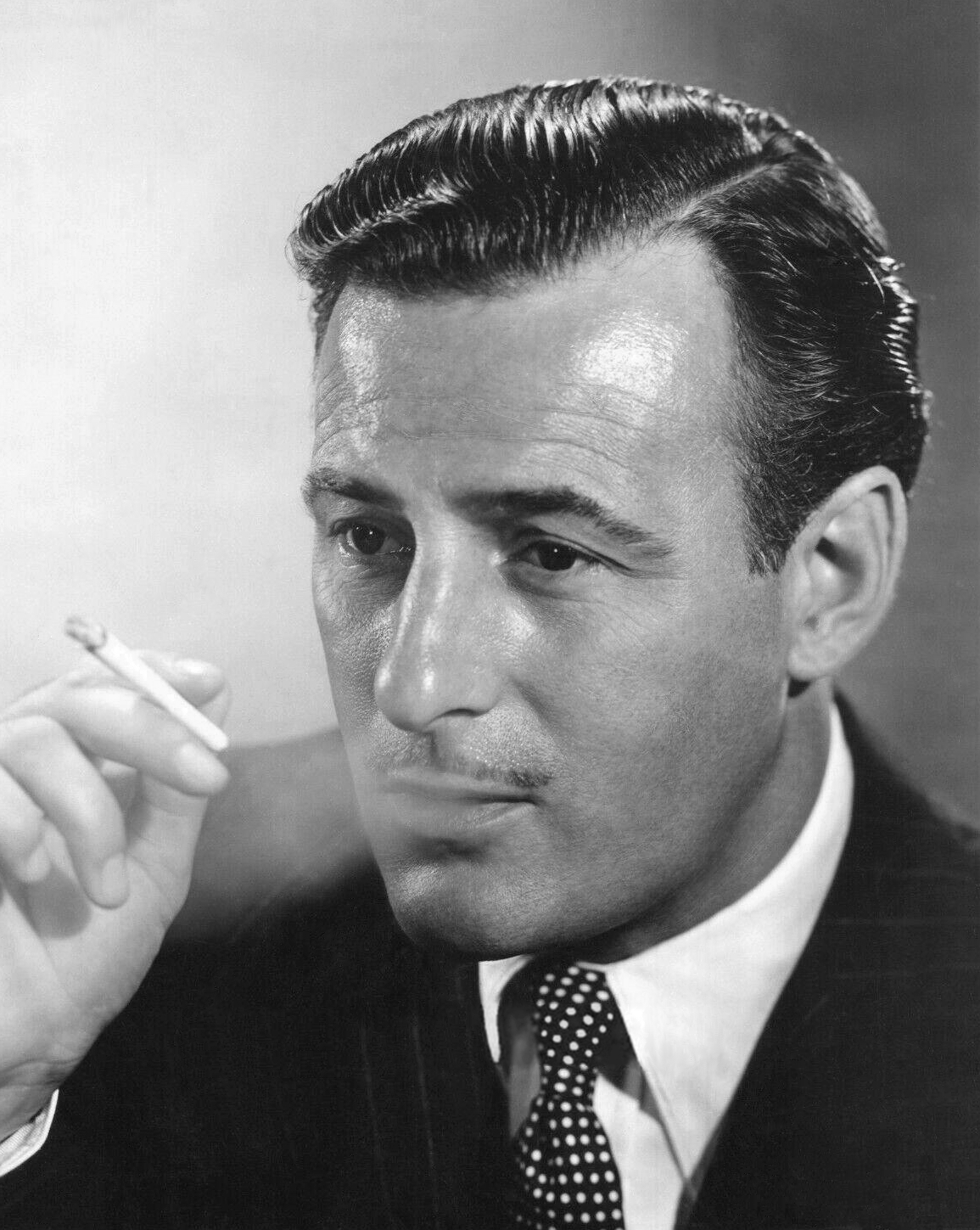
- Conway in 1942
- Born: Thomas Charles Sanders; 15 September 1904; Saint Petersburg, Russia
- Died: 22 April 1967 (aged 62); Culver City, California, US
- Education: Brighton College
- Occupation: Actor
- Years active: 1936–1964
- Spouses: Lillian Eggers (m. 1941; div. 1953) Queenie Leonard (m. 1958; div. 1963)
- Family: George Sanders (brother)

Tom Conway (born Thomas Charles Sanders; 15 September 1904 – 22 April 1967) was a British film, television, and radio actor. He is remembered for playing suave adventurer The Falcon in a series of 1940s films; and his appearances in three horror films produced by Val Lewton, Cat People (1942), I Walked with a Zombie (1943), and The Seventh Victim (1943). He was also known for playing several prominent fictional detectives on screen and radio, including Sherlock Holmes, The Saint, Bulldog Drummond, and Mark Saber.

== Early life ==
Conway was born in Saint Petersburg, Russia. His younger brother was actor George Sanders. The family moved from Russia to Britain when Tom was thirteen. He was educated at Brighton College then moved to Africa to find work. He returned to England, worked as a glass salesman, then became interested in acting.

== Career ==
=== England ===
He started by appearing in amateur theatre, then joined a repertory company for a year and a half. After this he appeared in touring productions of plays like Dangerous Corner, Private Lives, and By Candlelight, as well as acting on radio. Then Conway's brother George suggested Tom join him in Hollywood.

=== MGM ===
In May 1940 it was announced Tom had signed a contract with Metro-Goldwyn-Mayer. During this time, he changed his last name from Sanders to Conway. He had small roles in Waterloo Bridge (1940), with only his voice heard, Sky Murder (1940) with Walter Pidgeon, and The Wild Man of Borneo (1941). He had a bigger part in The Trial of Mary Dugan (1941) with Robert Young, then was back to small parts in Free and Easy (1941), The Bad Man (1941) with Wallace Beery and Lionel Barrymore, The People vs. Dr. Kildare (1941) with Lew Ayres and Lionel Barrymore, and Lady Be Good (1941) with Eleanor Powell and Red Skelton.

Conway played villains in Tarzan's Secret Treasure (1941) with Johnny Weissmuller and Maureen O'Sullivan, Mr. and Mrs. North (1941) with Gracie Allen, and Rio Rita (1942) with Abbott and Costello. He was a murder suspect in Grand Central Murder (1942) with Van Heflin and had an uncredited bit in Mrs. Miniver (1942) with Greer Garson and Walter Pidgeon.

=== RKO: The Falcon and Val Lewton ===
At RKO Radio Pictures, Conway's brother George Sanders had starred in three popular "B" movies as The Falcon, eligible man-about-town and amateur detective, constantly being accused of crimes and using his wits to trap the guilty parties and clear his name. Sanders had tired of the role, so the pencil-mustached Conway took over as The Falcon's Brother (1942), co-starring with Sanders (Sanders's character was killed off, leaving his brother to assume the mantle of The Falcon). Producer Maurice Geraghty later revealed that RKO executives recruited Conway so they could induce Sanders to make one more Falcon picture, after which the series would end. "So it was astonishing to them when Tom Conway caught on right away and carried the series on -- even outgrossing the pictures George had made." RKO signed Tom Conway to a long-term contract.

Conway followed this success with an excellent role in Cat People (1942), the first of producer Val Lewton's well remembered horror cycle. He had the male lead in a second film for Lewton, I Walked with a Zombie (1942), now regarded as a horror classic. Conway was top-billed in Lewton's The Seventh Victim (1943) playing the same role, psychiatrist Dr. Louis Judd, from Cat People.

Between his Falcon and Val Lewton assignments, RKO starred Conway in B mysteries: A Night of Adventure (1944), Two O'Clock Courage (1945), and Criminal Court (1946).

Conway was borrowed by United Artists for Whistle Stop (1946), in which he supported George Raft, Ava Gardner, and Victor McLaglen. In June 1946, Conway obtained a release from his RKO contract. He had already left the studio when his last RKO films were released: The Falcon's Alibi (on 1 July), Criminal Court (on 20 November), and The Falcon's Adventure (on 13 December).

== Freelance actor ==
In April 1943 Conway had said, "What I should really like to play is sophisticated comedy." Conway wasted no time in pursuing that goal; he had just left RKO, and by the first week of July he was already working in the farce comedy Strange Bedfellows, produced by Andrew L. Stone for United Artists release. The Eddie Bracken-Priscilla Lane film was ultimately released as Fun on a Weekend (1947).

It appeared that Tom Conway would find a new home at the new Eagle-Lion studio, where Bryan Foy, formerly a Warner Bros. executive, was now in charge of production. In September 1946 Eagle-Lion announced that former RKO producer Lee Marcus was preparing a new comedy, His Wedding Night, with Conway joining Dennis O'Keefe and Ann Richards as the leading players. O’Keefe dropped out and was replaced by Franchot Tone; the film went into production in November 1946 as Amy Comes Across, changed to Lost Honeymoon when released in 1947.

In January 1947 Eagle-Lion was preparing a film version of an upcoming novel. Showmen’s Trade Review reported, "Tom Conway, designated for star build-up by Bryan Foy, has been cast for one of the leading roles in Out of the Blue." The plan to star Conway fell through, and he was replaced by former Warner star George Brent. Like Conway, Brent was a major-studio star now accepting featured roles. Conway stayed with Eagle-Lion and was featured in Repeat Performance (1947).

On radio, Conway played Sherlock Holmes during the 1946–1947 season of The New Adventures of Sherlock Holmes, following Basil Rathbone's departure from the series. In spite of a similarly refined English accent, Conway was not as well received as Rathbone by audiences; he played Holmes for only one season.

Meanwhile Tom Conway couldn't find a berth at a major studio, but he wasn't alone; dozens of actors were underemployed when the majors committed to make fewer but more expensive pictures, with lower-budget productions sharply curtailed. Conway continued to work for independent producers. He signed with Artists Alliance Productions, an ambitious but short-lived independent, to appear in One Touch of Venus, released in 1948 by Universal. Artists Alliance was headed by silent-screen star Mary Pickford and producer-promoter Lester Cowan; their only other production was the Marx Brothers' last film, Love Happy (1949).

Bernard Small, the son of independent producer Edward Small, had secured the film rights to the Bulldog Drummond character and made two Drummond mysteries for Columbia Pictures release. In 1948, he moved the franchise to his father's Reliance Pictures, an independent company distributing through Fox, and hired Tom Conway to play Bulldog Drummond in The Challenge (1948) and 13 Lead Soldiers (1948). Independent producer Sam Baerwitz, cast Conway in low-budget crime stories released by Fox; The Checkered Coat (1948), Bungalow 13 (1948), I Cheated the Law (1949), and The Great Plane Robbery (1950).

=== Into the 1950s and early 1960s ===
When George Sanders married Zsa Zsa Gabor, Tom Conway joined the wedding party on April Fool's Day, 1949. She recalled in her memoir, "With an unexpected generosity, George chartered a plane and flew the wedding party [to Las Vegas]. His brother, Tom Conway, as warm and outgoing as George was cool and restrained, was best man, and came on the plane with a shotgun over his shoulder. 'Just in case the old boy gets cold feet,' he said." Conway appeared on the early television panel show Bachelor's Haven (1951), an advice-to-the-lovelorn forum patterned after the successful New York-based series Leave It to the Girls. He recruited his sister-in-law Zsa Zsa to join him on the program.

Beginning in May 1951, Tom Conway starred in the radio mystery series The Saint, portrayed by Sanders on film a decade earlier. Conway succeeded Edgar Barrier, Brian Aherne, and Vincent Price in the leading role, and was the last of the radio Saints, performing in 22 weekly episodes.

== Feature films ==
Back in the movie studios, Conway had supporting parts in Painting the Clouds with Sunshine (1951) and Bride of the Gorilla (1951). Apart from a lead in Confidence Girl (1952), he played supporting roles: Tarzan and the She-Devil (1953), Paris Model (1953), and Prince Valiant (1954). He also lent his smooth speaking voice to Walt Disney's Peter Pan (1953), as the film's narrator.

Conway went to England to star as Berkeley Gray's private detective Norman Conquest in Park Plaza 605 (released in America as Norman Conquest, 1953), and (using his own name instead of the Conquest tag) Blood Orange (1953). He also had leads in the British Barbados Quest (1955), Breakaway (1955), and The Last Man to Hang (1956). In 1956, brothers Tom Conway and George Sanders appeared (as brothers) in the film Death of a Scoundrel, with the star Sanders killing supporting player Conway. Conway's last British film was Operation Murder (1957).

In America, Conway co-starred in The She-Creature (1956) and Voodoo Woman (1957). He was featured in The Atomic Submarine (1959), and 12 to the Moon (1960). He provided his voice for Disney's 101 Dalmatians (1961) as a quizmaster in What's My Crime?—a parody of the game show What's My Line?—and as a collie that offers the dalmatians shelter in a barn, later guiding them home. His wife at the time, British actress Queenie Leonard (née Pearl Walker), voiced a cow in the barn. His final feature-film assignment was the all-star comedy What a Way to Go! (1964).

== Television ==
From 1951 to 1954, Conway played debonair British police detective Mark Saber in Inspector Mark Saber – Homicide Detective, produced by Roland D. Reed. In 1957, the series resumed on NBC, now filmed in England and renamed Saber of London, with Donald Gray in the title role.

Conway performed in the Alfred Hitchcock Presents episode "The Glass Eye" (1957) as Max Collodi, receiving critical praise. He had a supporting role in The Betty Hutton Show television series (1959–60). In 1964 he appeared on the top-rated Perry Mason series in "The Case of the Simple Simon," playing Guy Penrose, leading actor in a traveling repertory company.

Another actor made his network-television debut as "Tom Conway" on The Steve Allen Show in 1961, while the established actor Tom Conway was still working. To avoid confusion, the younger Tom Conway changed his professional name to Tim Conway in June 1962. As late as 1966 the two actors were being confused; a November 1966 broadcast of The Red Skelton Show was advertised with Tom Conway as the guest star, but the program actually featured Tim Conway.

== Final years ==
Tom Conway's health began to fail in the mid-1950s. In 1956, he was briefly hospitalized at the UCLA Medical Center for an operation; the hospital declined to disclose details other than that the patient was "resting comfortably." Weakened eyesight and alcoholism took their toll on him in later years. A 1960 drunk-driving arrest was reported in the national press; "I can't take a drunk test -- I'm too drunk", Conway stated after crashing his vehicle into a parked car. The driver, Joe Barron, suffered back and arm injuries. The case went to trial two weeks later, where Conway pleaded innocent.

His 12-year marriage to New York model Lillian Eggers ended in divorce in 1953. His second wife Queenie Leonard divorced him in 1963 because of his drinking problem. His alcoholism also cost him his relationship with his brother George Sanders, who broke off all contact with him.

Conway's career was finally stalled by health problems. In Conway's words, "The roof caved in all of a sudden." He underwent cataract surgery in both eyes, and his mobility was affected by a swollen left ankle. In September 1965, he briefly returned to the headlines when he was living in a $2-a-day room ($60 per month, equal to $605 in 2025) in a small beachfront hotel on 23-1/2 Windward Avenue in Venice, California. His landlady was former vaudevillian Agnes Lavaty: "Tom's not bitter. He doesn't even complain that his brother George Sanders hasn't contacted him." Conway's friend, Mary Robison of Venice, notified the Santa Monica Outlook of the actor's troubles, and a reporter visited Conway. "I find myself this way after many years of making considerable amounts of money", he told the reporter, who noted, "Mr. Conway still appears well-groomed, with a mustache and neat appearance. He is 60 years old. He said Mr. Sanders knew little or nothing about his plight because they had not been close in recent years." Syndicated reporter Harold Heffernan added, "Tom thinks it's extremely doubtful the revelation of his current illness and indigence will heal the old wounds."

The immediate aftermath brought phone calls "every five minutes," in Conway's words, but none from show business colleagues with only one exception. While Conway was having lunch in the little restaurant below the hotel, "I looked up, and coming through the door was Lew Ayres, whom I hadn't seen in years and years. It was a very nice feeling." Conway commented, "I have a place where I'll be able to live, and it looks as if there may be a job in the offing for me." Ayres made payments toward Conway's rent. Gifts, contributions, and offers of aid poured in for a time, but offers only hinted at soon fell through or never came to fruition. In 1962 and 1963 he had been a guest of the Motion Picture Country Home and Hospital, a haven for retired actors, but he refused to consider living there permanently. "There you're retired completely and have to give everything up. You're simply through. It's only a question of time until I'll be well. Then I want to operate a retreat in Baja California. I think I can get backers interested. It'll be like a sleepy Mexican fishing village."

Conway estimated he had earned $900,000 in his career -- "Fairly high living. Keeping up a front."—but was now subsisting on small amounts of federal aid. His Perry Mason appearance proved to be his last; "I don't particularly want to act," he said. He lost the last of his savings -- $15,000—to swindlers in a lumber deal: "I was a victim of the old shell game."

Hospitalized at John Wesley County Hospital in Los Angeles in April 1966 after being diagnosed with a liver ailment, he lapsed into a coma in July but regained consciousness two days later. His doctor said he was "remarkably improved [and] quite chipper."

In her memoir, former sister-in-law Zsa Zsa Gabor shed some light on Conway and George Sanders, and her relationships with them:

George’s brother, Tom Conway, too, remained a part of my life. When I was married to Herbert Hutner, my fourth husband, he and Herbert became friends. George contacted us to give us the tragic news that Tom had cirrhosis of the liver and that he was dying. I was very fond of Tom and we had a family reunion. At the end of it, George said, “Here, old boy, take this $40,000. Go to Capri and die there happy.” Tom did exactly as George said, except that he didn’t die. On Capri, Tom met a German scientist who had discovered a new serum that he wanted to test. He told Tom, “Let me try it out on you since you’re dying anyhow. It may kill you or it could, conceivably, cure you.” He persuaded Tom to try it and miraculously, he was cured. George, however, was now in a difficult situation -- particularly when Tom asked him for money. His voice ringing with determination, “I’m sorry, old boy,” said George. “You’re my brother but you are supposed to be dead. I never want to see you again.” After that, Herbert and I supported Tom every time he was broke. One day, his ex-wife called and said that this time Tom was, in earnest, on his deathbed. Francesca [Gabor's daughter] and I visited him at the hospital in downtown L.A. and when we left, I gave him $200, telling him, “Tip the nurses a little bit so they’ll be good to you." The next day the hospital called me and informed me that Tom had disappeared. I found out later that he had taken my $200, gone to see his girlfriend, had gotten drunk, and then went to bed with her. Then he died, right there in her bed. I contacted George, but he was still so livid about his $40,000 and Capri that he wouldn’t help me or even show up at the morgue to identify Tom’s body.

Gabor's account has Conway dying within two days after leaving the Los Angeles hospital, which wasn't true (Conway lived another nine months and died in a Culver City hospital). A published report states that Conway, after a four-month stay in the Los Angeles hospital, was transferred to a convalescent sanitarium, where he stayed three months.

He emerged in late 1966 with new health and spirit. He had given up drinking "completely. I'm on the wagon and I find the old brain works better... [I want to develop] a couple of gimmicks I devised while lying in the hospital. I've got a million things cooking." He devised at least two original inventions: tables topped with plastic slabs containing Mexican pebbles, and a pocket-sized travel kit featuring his own blend of shaving cream requiring no water. He even contemplated a return to acting: "It'll be a cold start, but acting-wise I think I'm at my peak." His living conditions, while still modest, had also improved; he was back in Los Angeles, living in a modern, $135-a-month apartment (equal to $1,340 in 2025) on Wilshire Boulevard. He decided against installing a telephone, and greeted visitors in person.

Conway never could capitalize on his plans. His rally came to a halt three months later, when he died of liver damage at Washington Hospital in Culver City, California on Saturday, 22 April 1967, at the age of 62. His funeral was held in London, and his ashes were inurned inside a private vault at Chapel of the Pines Crematory.

Despite his up-and-down professional and personal fortunes, Conway remained optimistic until the end. In his last newspaper interview, he admitted that recent years were "pretty rough" but now things looked "pretty good. You've got to hang on, last out, and wait for the breakthrough."

== Filmography ==
- Waterloo Bridge (1940) (film debut) (voice)
- Sky Murder (1940) as Andrew Hendon
- The Great Meddler (1940) as Henry Bergh (short)
- The Wild Man of Borneo (1941) as Actor in Film Scene (uncredited)
- The Trial of Mary Dugan (1941) as Edgar Wayne
- Free and Easy (1941) as Captain Ferris
- The Bad Man (1941) as Morgan Pell
- The People vs. Dr. Kildare (1941) as Mr. Channing
- Lady Be Good (1941) as Mr. Blanton
- Tarzan's Secret Treasure (1941) as Medford
- Mr. and Mrs. North (1942) as Louis Berex
- Rio Rita (1942) as Maurice Craindall
- Grand Central Murder (1942) as Frankie Ciro
- Mrs. Miniver (1942) as Man (uncredited)
- The Falcon's Brother (1942) as Tom Lawrence
- Cat People (1942) as Dr. Louis Judd
- The Falcon Strikes Back (1943) as Tom Lawrence
- I Walked with a Zombie (1943) as Paul Holland
- The Falcon in Danger (1943) as Tom Lawrence
- The Seventh Victim (1943) as Dr. Louis Judd
- The Falcon and the Co-eds (1943) as Tom Lawrence
- The Falcon Out West (1944) as Tom Lawrence
- A Night of Adventure (1944) as Mark Latham
- The Falcon in Mexico (1944) as Tom Lawrence
- The Falcon in Hollywood (1944) as Tom Lawrence
- Two O'Clock Courage (1945) as Ted "Step" Allison
- The Falcon in San Francisco (1945) as Tom Lawrence
- Whistle Stop (1946) as Lew Lentz
- The Falcon's Alibi (1946) as Tom Lawrence
- Criminal Court (1946) as Steve Barnes
- The Falcon's Adventure (1946) as Tom Lawrence
- Lost Honeymoon (1947) as Dr. Robert "Bob" Davis
- Fun on a Weekend (1947) as Jefferson Van Orsdale, Jr.
- Repeat Performance (1947) as John Friday
- The Challenge (1948) as Captain Hugh "Bulldog" Drummond
- 13 Lead Soldiers (1948) as Captain Hugh "Bulldog" Drummond
- The Checkered Coat (1948) as Dr. Michael Madden
- One Touch of Venus (1948) as Whitfield Savory
- Bungalow 13 (1948) as Christopher Adams
- I Cheated the Law (1949) as John Campbell
- The Great Plane Robbery (1950) as Ned Johnson
- Painting the Clouds with Sunshine (1951) as Bennington Lansing
- Bride of the Gorilla (1951) as Dr. Viet
- Confidence Girl (1952) as Roger Kingsley
- Peter Pan (1953) as Narrator (voice)
- Tarzan and the She-Devil (1953) as Fidel
- Park Plaza 605 (1953) as Norman Conquest
- Blood Orange (1953) as Tom Conway, private investigator
- Paris Model (1953) as Maharajah of Kim-Kepore
- Prince Valiant (1954) as Sir Kay
- Barbados Quest (1955) as Tom Martin
- Breakaway (1955) as Tom "Duke" Martin
- The She-Creature (1956) as Timothy Chappel
- The Last Man to Hang (1956) as Sir Roderick Strood
- Death of a Scoundrel (1956) as Gerry Monte, aka Sabourin
- Alfred Hitchcock Presents (1957) (Season 3 Episode 1: "The Glass Eye") as Max Collodi
- Operation Murder (1957) as Dr. Wayne
- Voodoo Woman (1957) as Dr. Roland Gerard
- Alfred Hitchcock Presents (1959) (Season 4 Episode 21: "Relative Value") as Inspector
- The Atomic Submarine (1959) as Sir Ian Hunt
- Alfred Hitchcock Presents (1960) (Season 5 Episode 35: "The Schartz-Metterklume Method") as John Wellington (uncredited)
- 12 to the Moon (1960) as Dr. Feodor Orloff
- One Hundred and One Dalmatians (1961) as Quizmaster / Collie (voice)
- What a Way to Go! (1964) as Lord Kensington (final film) (uncredited)
