= The Long Shadow (1961 film) =

1961 British film by Peter Maxwell

- Directed by: Peter Maxwell
- Written by: Manning O'Brine
- Produced by: John Pellatt
- Starring: John Crawford; Susan Hampshire
- Cinematography: Norman Warwick
- Edited by: Allan Morrison
- Music by: Bill McGuffie
- Production company: Argo Film Productions
- Distributed by: J. Arthur Rank Film Distributors
- Release date: 31 July 1961 (UK)
- Running time: 64 minutes
- Country: United Kingdom
- Language: English

The Long Shadow is a 1961 British second feature ('B') drama film directed by Peter Maxwell and starring John Crawford, Susan Hampshire and Willoughby Goddard. It was written by Manning O'Brine and filmed at Pinewood Studios.

== Plot summary ==
In Vienna during the Cold War, the Russians and Americans try to gain control of a boy who can be manipulated for political purposes. An American newspaper journalist attempts to save the Hungarian child and a Swedish nurse from certain death.

== Cast ==
- John Crawford as Kelly
- Susan Hampshire as Gunilla
- Willoughby Goddard as Schober
- Humphrey Lestocq as Bannister
- Rory O'Brine as Ruchi Korbanyi
- Anne Castaldini as Magda
- Margaret Robertson as mother
- Bill Nagy as Garity
- Lily Kann as old lady
- Hana-Maria Pravda as matron
- Gisele Burke as Lisel
- Sean Sullivan as Burgen

== Reception ==
The Monthly Film Bulletin wrote: "Yet another adventure of that meddlesome, gallant, punch-drunk type, the American foreign correspondent, this time engaged in spy-bashing and the foiling of kidnappers in a remarkably unconcerned Austria. As usual the mackintosh-clad East Europeans talk sinister but fight fair and are deservedly thwarted with heavy casualties. Perhaps what this worn-out fantasy genre needs to refurbish it is a drama about a sub-editor, kept late at the office impatiently revising the undoubtedly ill-phrased, garbled copy of these screen journalists-of-fortune who show talent for almost every activity but writing."
