= Rocky Taylor =

English stuntman and actor

- Born: Laurie Taylor; 28 February 1945 (age 81); Bermondsey, England
- Occupations: Stuntman, actor
- Years active: 1961–present
- Relatives: Larry Taylor (father)

Rocky Taylor (born Laurie Taylor; 28 February 1945) is an English stuntman and actor.

== Career ==
His first appearance as a stuntman was an uncredited role in Dr. No. He has since been a stuntman for many famous and successful films including multiple James Bond and Indiana Jones films, A Bridge Too Far, Titanic, The Da Vinci Code, Harry Potter and the Deathly Hallows – Part 1 and the HBO television series Game of Thrones. He has also had minor acting roles in 40 films, including doubling for Roger Moore and Sean Connery in James Bond films. He is also known for playing the original Honey Monster in a series of commercials for Sugar Puffs.

Taylor currently holds the record for being the oldest stuntman in Britain, with 35 years as a stunt performer and 20 years as a stunt coordinator. He appeared on Russell Howard's Good News in 2011 to discuss his career.

=== Accidents ===
Taylor suffered a fractured spine in 1985 when a stunt on the film Death Wish 3 went wrong, but survived the fall from a burning building. He performed the stunt successfully 26 years later in 2011.

== Personal life ==
Taylor was born in Bermondsey, southeast London, England. His father Larry was also a stuntman, appearing in several films, including Zulu and a 1958 Titanic film, A Night to Remember.

In April 2019, he released his official biography, Jump Rocky Jump, with Pegasus Elliot Mackenzie Publishers.

On 2 April 2020, Taylor was reported to be in "critical condition" after contracting COVID-19.

== Selective filmography ==
Year	Title	Role	Notes
1961	Gorgo	Man in Crowd	Uncredited
1967	The Dirty Dozen	Airborne Soldier	Uncredited
1974	The Man with the Golden Gun	Beirut Thug	Uncredited
1981	Raiders of the Lost Ark	Staff Car Driver	Uncredited
1983	Never Say Never Again	Hostage Guard	Uncredited
1989	Batman	Napier Hood #5	
1997	Titanic	Bert Cartmell	
1997	Tomorrow Never Dies	Carver's Thug	Uncredited
1999	The World Is Not Enough	Man in Restaurant	Uncredited
2002	Die Another Day	Man at Sword Club	Uncredited
2018	Final Score	Lift Guard	Credited
