= Manning O'Brine =

Irish writer of thrillers and television screenplays

Paddy Manning O'Brine was an Irish writer of thrillers and television screenplays about whom surprisingly little is known. His date and place of birth is uncertain: at least one authoritative source gives it as 1915; the dust jacket of his last American publication, however, says that he was born in Connemara, Ireland, in 1913 with dual Irish and Italian citizenship. Internet booksellers frequently give his date of death as 1977; others cite 1974. All of his novels concern espionage and/or secret agents and often feature sadistic Nazis who have survived World War II and are hunted down and killed.

The New York Times review of No Earth for Foxes closes with these lines: "The jacket copy has a sentence about O'Brine that is a real stopper. 'He killed his first Nazi in Heidelberg in 1937 and his last one in Madagascar in 1950.' Try to top that one."

The backcover blurb for the 1976 American paperback edition says in addition that O'Brine was a former British secret agent.

During World War II, he was parachuted into Occupied France, was captured by the Gestapo, escaped from a train taking him to Buchenwald, and served in Algeria, Yugoslavia and Italy. He has been awarded medals from many nations.

The dust jacket of Pale Moon Rising is somewhat more restrained in its biographical details, although certainly testifying to an unusually varied, and perilous, life:

He studied art and architecture at Rome University and became a scenic designer. He was a Commando during the War, carrying out many missions in France, North Africa and Yugoslavia. He then fought in Palestine with the Israelis against Glubb Pasha and the Arab Legion, and subsequently arrived in Cairo where he took on the job of managing a stranded Opera company. He returned to Italy and, whilst working in Rome Film Studios, wrote the story for Fellini's first film "Rome:Open City". Manning O'Brine lived in Sussex with his wife and four sons.

Manning O'Brine is not credited on "Rome:Open City". Screenplay credits are by Sergio Amidei and Federico Fellini from a story by Sergio Amidei. Roberto Rossellini was the director.

O'Brine began with a series of seven books about Michael the O'Kelly that were somewhat light-hearted in tone. He then wrote four novels that were grimmer and more realistic in nature and for which he received a certain amount of critical praise. These books are: Crambo, Mills, No Earth for Foxes, and Pale Moon Rising, the latter being set in wartime France. A number of common characters appear throughout these books, such as Pavane and Crambo, but the most important one is generally Mills, who is obsessed, as apparently O'Brine himself was, with tracking down and killing Nazi war criminals.

His last novel, Pale Moon Rising, is apparently based on his own experiences as a 30-year-old in wartime France. Of it, the New York Times wrote, "[it] is well-written and is an exciting adventure story. But transcending all is Mr. O'Brine's loathing for Nazi Germany, the ubermenschen and all they represented. He uses his book as a not very subtle tract to condemn the system."

He also wrote the screenplays for films including Man from Tangier (1957) and The Long Shadow (1961) and episodes of television series including No Hiding Place and The Saint.

His novel Passport to Treason was filmed in 1956 by producer-director Robert S. Baker, starring Rod Cameron.

In a bitterly worded and ironic forward to No Earth for Foxes called "A Note from the Author", O'Brine wrote in 1973 or 1974 that:

...it remains a nightmare reality that, in 1965, ex-Nazis held 21 ministerial and state secretarial appointments in West Germany alone; 128 were generals of the Bundeswehr; 828 were high judges, court counselors, public prosecutors; 245 were with embassies and consulates of the Bonn Foreign Service; 297 were in key positions in the police and secret services.... If facts are interpreted by some as prejudice, then I stand a prejudiced man; if knowledge can be termed bigotry, I am truly a bigot."

Of Mills, the hero of the eponymously named 1969 novel, a man "who came out of World War II with a blinding obsession: the eradication of Nazi butchers," the New York Times wrote, "You won't always like Mills, you'll find his story drags a bit in spots, but you'll discover both subtly compelling all the same."

== Novels ==
British publisher first, followed by American publisher, hardback editions only

Killers Must Eat, Hammond, 1951
Corpse to Cairo, Hammond, 1952
Dodos Don't Duck, Hammond, 1953
Deadly Interlude, Hammond, 1954
Passport to Treason, Hammond, 1955
The Hungry Killer, Hammond, 1955
Dagger before Me, Hammond, 1957
Mills, Jenkins, 1969; Lippincott, 1969
Crambo, Joseph, 1970
No Earth for Foxes, Barrie and Jenkins, 1974; Delacorte Press, 1975, ISBN 044006208X
Pale Moon Rising, Futura, 1978; St. Martin's Press, 1978, ISBN 0-312-59478-X
