= Southall Studios =

Defunct London film studio

General information
- Status: Demolished
- Type: Film studio
- Location: Gladstone Road, Southall, United Kingdom
- Coordinates: 51.5035°N 0.3843°W
- Construction started: 1924
- Completed: 1924
- Renovated: 1936
- Demolished: 1960

Technical details
- Floor area: Approx. 7,500 square feet (700 m^{2}) on 3 stages

Southall Studios was a film studio located in Southall, Middlesex (now west London) which operated between 1924 and 1958.

The studio was a vibrant and productive part of Southall's cultural history. At its peak – in the early 1950s – the film-making facility employed almost 100 permanent staff.

Some of England's best-known actors worked at Southall Studios: Richard Attenborough, Dirk Bogarde, Joan Collins, and horror legend Boris Karloff.

== History ==
=== Early years: 1924-1935 ===
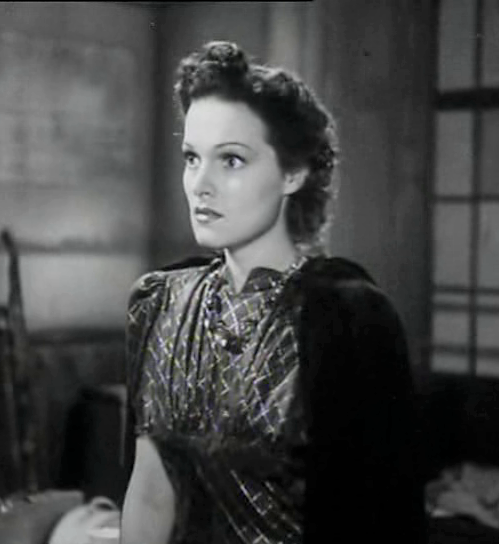
Linden Travers's first film was Children of the Fog (1935), made at the original studio; she returned for the lead role in No Orchids for Miss Blandish (1948) at the rebuilt studio

In 1924, film pioneer G. B. Samuelson converted an old aircraft hangar in Gladstone Road, Southall into a film-making facility.

Following some short films, Samuelson directed the studio's first feature film in 1928. Silent comedy Two Little Drummer Boys starred Alma Taylor – a major British star in the 1920s – and variety entertainer Wee Georgie Wood.

Converted for sound in the early 1930s, Southall's most significant film in the studio's early years was Children of the Fog (1935), made by influential German expressionist director Leopold Jessner. Jessner was a Jew working anonymously in exile from Adolf Hitler's Germany. The film's German cinematographer was also notable: Eugen Schüfftan was the inventor of a special effect called the Schüfftan process.

=== Fire and wartime: 1936-1945 ===
On 29 October 1936 (a Thursday), beginning around 3 a.m., a large fire caused Southall Studios to be burned to the ground. Thousands of pounds' worth of equipment was lost, and reels for two recently-completed films were destroyed. The studios were soon-after rebuilt, at a cost of £9,666 (equivalent to over £570,000 in 2024). Of the few films completed at Southall before the start of World War II, 1938's Bed and Breakfast is of note for being the last appearance in a feature film of Cockney silent-star Mabel Poulton.

No filming took place at Southall for the duration of World War II (1939-1945). The studio was not at first required for support of the war effort, and an entertainments licence allowed the studio to be used as a dance-hall (called the Locarno) from January to November 1940. The premises functioned also as a roller-skating rink. 400 people attended the Locarno dance-hall's Grand Opening Ball on 24 January 1940, dancing until midnight. In the summer of 1940 the Locarno was twice fined for failing adequately to observe the blackout.

In November 1940, the Minister of Aircraft Production, Lord Beaverbrook, requisitioned the site, turning it over to Fairey Aviation, an aeroplane manufacturer with a factory in nearby Hayes. The Locarno dance-hall was consequently relocated to Ealing.

The Luftwaffe fired on the site during wartime, but the rebuilt studio survived intact and, de-requisitioned after the war ended, the film-making facility entered into a busy post-war period.

=== Golden age: 1946-1958 ===
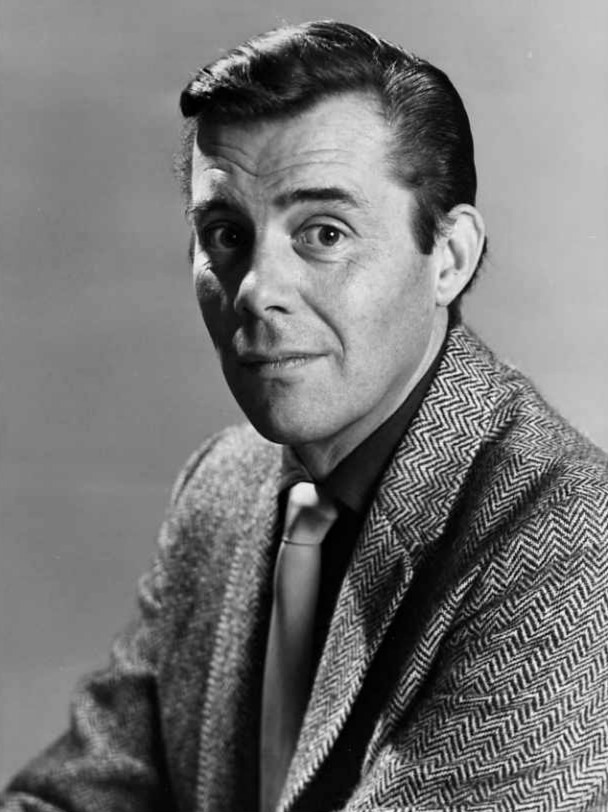
Dirk Bogarde featured in Dancing with Crime, 1947

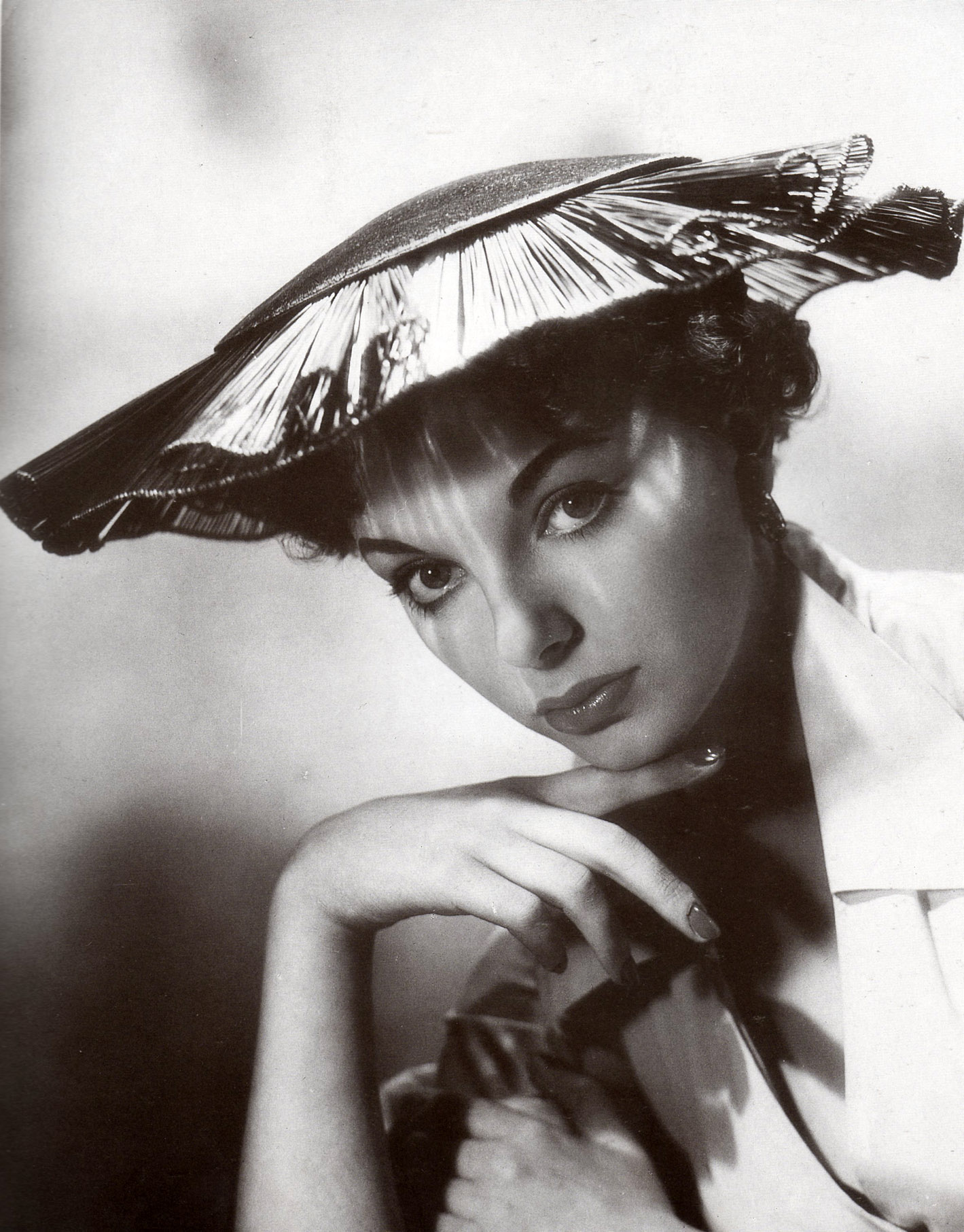
Joan Collins starred in Judgment Deferred, 1952

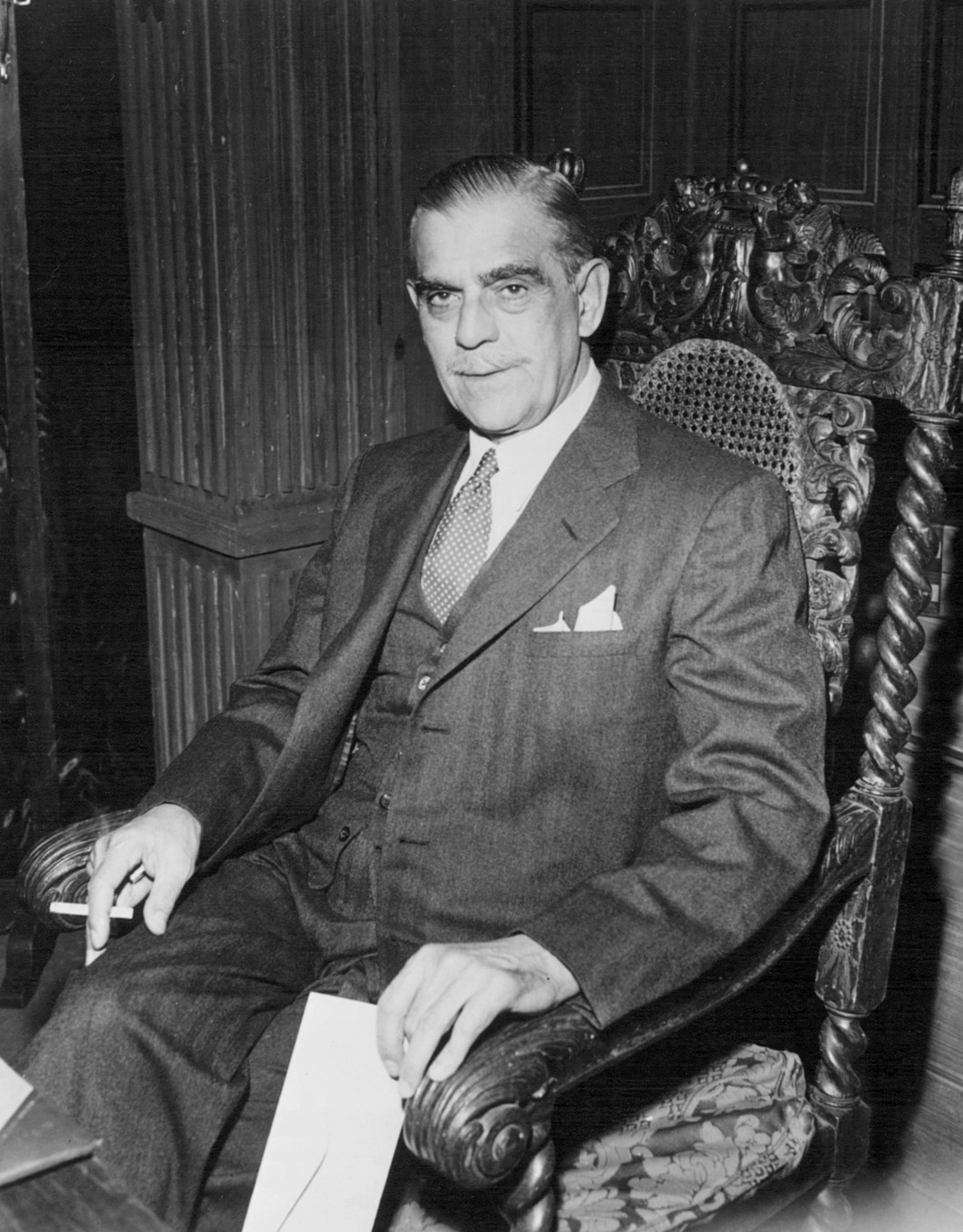
Boris Karloff played Inspector March, 1952-53

The years following the Second World War marked "Southall's golden age". After 1945, Alliance Film Studios acquired the premises, and the studio entered into its most productive period, producing noteworthy films in a variety of genres.

Examples include: British film noir Dancing with Crime (1947) with Richard Attenborough, Dirk Bogarde and Diana Dors; drama Judgment Deferred (1952) starring Joan Collins; semi-documentary disaster film The Brave Don't Cry (1952) with John Gregson; and "all very British" comedies, such as Miss Robin Hood (1952) and The Runaway Bus (1954) starring Margaret Rutherford, and The Oracle (1953) featuring the enigmatic Gilbert Harding.

Controversy attended one Southall Studios production. 1948 gangster film No Orchids For Miss Blandish attracted outrage: The Monthly Film Bulletin called it "The most sickening exhibition of brutality, perversion, sex and sadism ever to be shown on a cinema screen"; the Daily Express said "the film sets out to appeal to the prurient-minded, the twisted, the unbalanced"; Labour politician Edith Summerskill claimed the film would "pervert the minds of the British people". The president of the BBFC apologised to the Home Secretary of the day, James Chuter Ede, for having "failed to protect the public" from No Orchids For Miss Blandish. Notoriety contributed to the film's commercial success on initial release, but it was rarely shown again until 2006, by which time it was felt to deserve a modest PG certificate, for "mild violence and threat".

Noted documentary-maker John Grierson – who coined the word "documentary" – worked at Southall from 1951 to 1953, running Group 3 Films with director/producer John Baxter.) Grierson used his documentary/realist approach to critical and commercial success as executive producer on The Brave Don't Cry (1952), a semi-documentary feature about the 1950 Knockshinnoch mining disaster. Grierson & Baxter moved base from Southall to Beaconsfield Film Studios in 1953; Group 3 Films stopped production in 1955.

In 1952, Southall Studios employed almost 100 permanent staff. This was its busiest time: besides producing feature films, more work arrived in connection with the increasingly important television industry. The highest-profile television programme produced at Southall at this time was Colonel March of Scotland Yard, starring Frankenstein legend Boris Karloff as the fictional detective of the title. The 26-episode series featured some well-known actors in individual episodes, among them Christopher Lee and Anthony Newley. Three initial pilot episodes filmed in 1952 were compiled to make 1953 film Colonel March Investigates.

In the second half of the 1950s, employment at the studio showed a downward trend. In 1956, there were 47 permanent staff: half the 1952 figure. Worthwhile film and television work continued to be produced there. Crime film Kill Me Tomorrow (1957), for example, starred seasoned Hollywood actor Pat O'Brien. The 1955 launch in Britain of commercial television station ITV brought in a new source of income: making television adverts. But Southall's end was nigh: the studio would close before the end of the decade.

Southall Studios ended on a high note. The final project to be completed there was science-fiction/horror film The Trollenberg Terror (1958). First produced at Southall as a television series in 1956-1957, the full-length feature (re-titled The Crawling Eye in the USA) would go on to achieve cult classic status. More than twenty years later, acclaimed director John Carpenter acknowledged The Trollenberg Terror as an influence on his 1980 supernatural horror film The Fog.

Some actors who went on to attain distinction in science-fiction made films (in other genres) at Southall in its golden age: the first and the third Doctor in Doctor Who: William Hartnell and Jon Pertwee; and the actor who played the first Klingon in the original Star Trek, John Colicos.

Five "Bond girl" actresses worked at Southall Studios before going on to appear in the James Bond films: Lois Maxwell (Miss Moneypenny, 1962-1985); Honor Blackman (Pussy Galore, 1964); Eunice Gayson (Sylvia Trench, 1962 & 1963); Zena Marshall (Miss Taro, 1962); and Shirley Eaton; (golden girl Jill Masterson, 1964).

Several regulars of the Carry On films worked individually at Southall Studios: Sid James, Charles Hawtrey, Joan Sims, Kenneth Connor, Peter Butterworth, and Esma Cannon.

John Schlesinger – later an eminent, Oscar-winning director – worked twice at Southall Studios as a young actor.

Freddie Mills – the ex-boxer whose mysterious 1965 death continues to attract lurid speculation – acted in two films at Southall Studios in the 1950s.

=== Closure and demolition: 1959-1960 ===
Southall Studios closed in 1959. The film-making facility was demolished in or around 1960, and no trace of it remains. Film buffs visiting the site in the years following demolition found an industrial estate where the studio once stood.

== Southall Studios films ==
Films made at Southall Studios, Gladstone Road
Year	Film	Director	Selected cast	Ref.
1925	It is Never Too Late to Mend	Alexander Butler		
1926	If Youth But Knew	George A. Cooper	Godfrey Tearle, Lillian Hall-Davis	
1928	Two Little Drummer Boys	G. B. Samuelson	Alma Taylor, Wee Georgie Wood, Derrick De Marney	
1928	For Valour	G. B. Samuelson	Dallas Cairns, Mary Rorke, Roy Travers	
1928	The Forger	G. B. Samuelson	Nigel Barrie, Lillian Rich, Sam Livesey	
1930	Piccadilly Nights	Albert H. Arch	Billie Rutherford, Maurice Winnick	
1935	Children of the Fog	Leopold Jessner	Linden Travers, Barbara Gott, Marjorie Corbett	
1936	Dodging the Dole	John E. Blakeley	Dan Young, Jenny Howard, Barry K. Barnes	
1936	Murder at the Cabaret	Reginald Fogwell	Phyllis Robins, James Carew	
1937	The Penny Pool	George Black	Douglas Wakefield, Tommy Fields, Harry Terry	
1938	Bed and Breakfast	Walter West	Barry Lupino, Mabel Poulton, Frank Miller	
1947	Dancing with Crime	John Paddy Carstairs	Richard Attenborough, Dirk Bogarde, Diana Dors	
1947	Just William's Luck	Val Guest	A. E. Matthews, Hy Hazell, Joan Hickson	
1948	No Orchids for Miss Blandish	St. John Legh Clowes	Linden Travers, Zoe Gail, Irene Prador	
1948	Things Happen at Night	Francis Searle	Gordon Harker, Robertson Hare	
1948	William Comes to Town	Val Guest	A. E. Matthews, Jon Pertwee, Peter Butterworth	
1948	Bless 'Em All	Robert Jordan Hill	Hal Monty, Max Bygraves, Jack Milroy	
1949	Third Time Lucky	Gordon Parry	Glynis Johns, Harcourt Williams, Michael Hordern	
1949	The Nitwits on Parade	Robert Jordan Hill	Max Bygraves, Sid Millward, Penny Calvert	
1949	High Jinks in Society	John Guillermin & Robert Jordan Hill	Moore Marriott, Michael Ward, George Chisholm	
1949	Melody in the Dark	Robert Jordan Hill	Eunice Gayson, Richard Thorp, Ida Patlanski	
1949	I Was a Dancer	Frank Richardson	Diana Napier	
1949	Skimpy in the Navy	Stafford Dickens	Hal Monty, Max Bygraves, Avril Angers	
1949	The Man from Yesterday	Oswald Mitchell	John Stuart, Marie Burke, Laurence Harvey	
1950	The Twenty Questions Murder Mystery	Paul L. Stein	Robert Beatty, Rona Anderson, Kynaston Reeves	
1950	Torment	John Guillermin	Dermot Walsh, Rona Anderson, John Bentley	
1950	No Trace	John Gilling	Dinah Sheridan, John Laurie, Dora Bryan	
1950	The Dragon of Pendragon Castle	John Baxter	Graham Moffatt, Jane Welsh, C. Denier Warren	
1950	The Second Mate	John Baxter	Gordon Harker, Graham Moffatt, Sam Kydd	
1951	The Quiet Woman	John Gilling	Jane Hylton, Derek Bond, Dora Bryan	
1951	Cheer the Brave	Kenneth Hume	Elsie Randolph, Marie Ault, Vida Hope	
1952	The Voice of Merrill	John Gilling	Valerie Hobson, James Robertson Justice	
1952	The Brave Don't Cry	Philip Leacock	John Gregson, Fulton Mackay, Archie Duncan	
1952	Time Gentlemen, Please!	Lewis Gilbert	Sid James, Hermione Baddeley, Dora Bryan	
1952	Brandy for the Parson	John Eldridge	Kenneth More, Charles Hawtrey, Alfie Bass	
1952	Miss Robin Hood	John Guillermin	Margaret Rutherford, Sid James, Reg Varney	
1952	Judgment Deferred	John Baxter	Joan Collins, Bransby Williams, Mary Merrall	
1952	You're Only Young Twice	Terry Bishop	Duncan Macrae, Joseph Tomelty, Charles Hawtrey	
1952	Nutcracker	Cyril Frankel	John Gilpin, Belinda Wright	
1953	Love in Pawn	Charles Saunders	Reg Dixon, Jeannie Carson, John Laurie	
1953	The Fake	Godfrey Grayson	Guy Middleton, Leslie Phillips, Billie Whitelaw	
1953	Deadly Nightshade	John Gilling	Emrys Jones, Zena Marshall, Joan Hickson	
1953	Background	Daniel Birt	Valerie Hobson, Mandy Miller, Thora Hird	
1953	Escape by Night	John Gilling	Bonar Colleano, Sid James, Andrew Ray, Ted Ray	
1953	Laxdale Hall	John Eldridge	Raymond Huntley, Fulton Mackay, Prunella Scales	
1953	The Oracle	C. M. Pennington-Richards	Virginia McKenna, Mervyn Johns, Gilbert Harding	
1953	The Steel Key	Robert S. Baker	Terence Morgan, Esmond Knight, Esma Cannon	
1953	The Wedding of Lilli Marlene	Arthur Crabtree	Sid James, Irene Handl, Dandy Nichols	
1953	Three Steps to the Gallows	John Gilling	Mary Castle, Colin Tapley, Ballard Berkeley	
1953	Colonel March Investigates	Cy Endfield	Boris Karloff, Richard Wattis, Joan Sims	
1954	The Master Plan	Cy Endfield	Norman Wooland, Wayne Morris, Frederick Schrecker	
1954	The Runaway Bus	Val Guest	Frankie Howerd, Margaret Rutherford, Petula Clark	
1954	Life with the Lyons	Val Guest	Bebe Daniels, Ben Lyon, Belinda Lee	
1954	Double Exposure	John Gilling	John Bentley, Ingeborg von Kusserow, Doris Hare	
1954	Child's Play	Margaret Thomson	Mona Washbourne, Christopher Beeny, Anneke Wills	
1955	Barbados Quest	Bernard Knowles	Tom Conway, Brian Worth, John Colicos	
1955	See How They Run	Leslie Arliss	Ronald Shiner, Greta Gynt, Wilfrid Hyde-White	
1955	The Lyons in Paris	Val Guest	Bebe Daniels, Ben Lyon, Molly Weir	
1955	Reluctant Bride	Henry Cass	Virginia Bruce, Arthur Lowe, Alexander Gauge	
1955	No Smoking	Henry Cass	Belinda Lee, Lionel Jeffries, Doris Hare	
1955	One Jump Ahead	Charles Saunders	Diane Hart, Jill Adams, Freddie Mills	
1955	Windfall	Henry Cass	Lionel Jeffries, Jack Watling, Gordon Jackson	
1956	Behind the Headlines	Charles Saunders	Adrienne Corri, Harry Fowler, Hazel Court	
1957	Account Rendered	Peter Graham Scott	Griffith Jones, Honor Blackman, Ursula Howells	
1957	Kill Me Tomorrow	Terence Fisher	Pat O'Brien, Lois Maxwell, Freddie Mills	
1957	Stranger in Town	George Pollock	Alex Nicol, Mona Washbourne, Arthur Lowe	
1957	Date with Disaster	Charles Saunders	William Hartnell, Maurice Kaufmann, Shirley Eaton	
1957	The End of the Line	Charles Saunders	Barbara Shelley, Jennifer Jayne	
1957	The Big Chance	Peter Graham Scott	Adrienne Corri, William Russell	
1957	There's Always a Thursday	Charles Saunders	Charles Victor, Frances Day, Jill Ireland	
1958	Stormy Crossing	C. M. Pennington-Richards	John Ireland, Derek Bond, John Schlesinger	
1958	The Supreme Secret	Norman Walker	Ralph Michael, Harry Fowler, Suzan Farmer	
1958	The Trollenberg Terror	Quentin Lawrence	Forrest Tucker, Janet Munro, Warren Mitchell	

== See also ==
- Eros Films
- Group 3 Films
- Tempean Films
