= Green Grow the Rushes =

Green Grow the Rushes may refer to:

- "Green Grow the Rushes, O", a folksong
- Green Grow the Rushes (novel), a 1949 novel by Howard Clewes
- Green Grow the Rushes (film), a 1951 film based on the novel
- "Green Grow the Rushes", a song by R.E.M. from the 1985 album Fables of the Reconstruction

== See also ==
- Green Grow the Rashes, a 1783 song by Scottish poet Robert Burns
