= Book League of America =

American book publisher (1930–1950s)

- Type: Private
- Industry: Book publishing/Bookselling
- Founded: 1930
- Defunct: 1950s
- Successor: Literary Guild
- Headquarters: New York City, New York, US
- Area served: United States
- Key people: Lawrence W. Lamm
- Products: Contemporary and world classic books
- Services: Mail order book sales club
- Owner: Doubleday, 1936

The Book League of America, Inc. was a US book publisher and mail order book sales club. It was established in 1930, a few years after the Book of the Month Club. Its founder was Lawrence Lamm, previously an editor at Macmillan Inc. The company was located at 100 Fifth Avenue, New York City, New York, in a 240,000-square-foot (22,000 m^{2}) office building that was constructed in 1906. It printed and distributed a variety of volumes in the 1920s, 1930s, 1940s, and 1950s. A victim of the Great Depression, the Book League of America was purchased by Doubleday in 1936.

== Products ==
Book League of America printed and published contemporary and classic books. The clothbound hardcover was commonly a dark navy-blue, though sometimes red or black. There was an embossed logo on the front. Depending upon a variety of exposure conditions and perhaps publishing years, the spine cloth faded differently, with some of the spines remaining dark navy, while others turned purple or navy-green. The spine featured book title and author in gold or silver gilt lettering, along with decorative scrolling, sometimes in an art deco motif.

Most of the pages were smooth-cut on the top and bottom edges, and deckle-edged on the outer edge. Some books contained the note: "This book is standard length, complete and unabridged. Manufactured under wartime conditions in conformity with all government regulations controlling the use of paper and other materials." This explains the yellowed or tanning paper condition, more noticeable in some books than others. Some books were illustrated. Many of the books did not include a publish date. Dust jackets were not included.

== Services ==
Approximately 5,000 subscribers received monthly fliers that offered a selection from a variety of contemporary and world classic literature choices.

"The famous Board of Editors selects for you 2 books each month: the best new book -AND- one of the greatest classics. The Book League of America supplies these 2 books each month at 1/3 of the usual cost!

Some books, published by other companies but carrying the Book League of America imprint, were included in the club sales offerings. These publishers included:

- A. S. Barnes & Company, New York
- Bartholomew House, Inc., New York
- Blakiston Company, Philadelphia
- Blue Ribbon Books, New York
- Caxton House Inc., New York
- Doubleday, Doran and Company, Inc., New York
- E. M. Hale and Company, Wisconsin
- Everybody's Vacation Publishing Company, New York
- Literary Classics Inc., New York
- Puritan Publishing Company, Chicago & Philadelphia
- William H. Wise & Co., New York

There was no membership fee to join the plan. The subscription cost $16.68 and entitled the subscriber to twelve books each year.

== Partial list ==
=== A ===
- A Connecticut Yankee in King Arthur's Court, by Mark Twain, 1917
- Abe Lincoln of Pigeon Creek, by William E. Wilson, 1950
- Across the Frontiers, by Sir Philip Gibbs, 1938
- A History of New York & The Sketch Book, by Washington Irving
- Alice's Adventures in Wonderland, by Lewis Carroll, 1941
- All Night Long, a Novel of Guerilla Warfare in Russia, by Erskine Caldwell, 1942
- All that glitters, by Frances Parkinson Keyes, 1941
- Always A River, by Drayton Mayrant, 1957
- America Visited, by Dickens, Thackeray and Others; arranged by Edith I. Coombs, 1937
- Areopagitica and Other Prose Writings, by John Milton; editor William Haller, 1929
- A Tale of Two Cities & Christmas Carol & The Chimes, by Charles Dickens
- At the Sign of the Reine Pédauque, by Anatole France, 1931
- A Time Will Come, by Rachel McBrayer Varble, 1940
- A Woman is Witness, a Paris Diary, by Ernst Lothar, 1941
- Away All Boats, by Kenneth Dodson, 1954

=== B ===
- Ben-Hur: A Tale of the Christ, by Lew Wallace
- Bernard Shaw, by Frank Harris, 1931
- Beyond Horizons, by Lincoln Ellsworth, 1938
- Bless This House, by Norah Lofts, 1955

=== C ===
- Camille, by Alexandre Dumas, 1937
- Captains Courageous, by Rudyard Kipling
- Captain Of The Medici, by John J. Pugh, 1955
- Captain Lightfoot, by W.R. Burnett, 1955
- Caravan for China, by Frank Stuart, 1941
- Catch the Gold Ring, by John Stephen Strange (pen name of Dorothy Stockbridge Tillett), 1955
- Chance, a Tale in Two Parks, by Joseph Conrad, 1921
- Charlotte and Dr. James, by Guy McCrone, 1956
- Christmas Holiday, by W. Somerset Maugham
- Cimarron, by Edna Ferber
- Cities of Refuge, a Novel, by Philip Gibbs, 1937
- Comedies of Oscar Wilde, by Oscar Wilde
- Comedies of Molière, selected by John Gassner; translation by Baker & Miller, 1946
- Confessors of the Name, by Gladys Schmitt, 1953
- Conquest of Mexico, by William H. Prescott, 1934
- Conquest of Peru, by William H. Prescott
- Coromandel!, by John Masters, 1956
- Crocus, a Novel, by Neil Bell (pen name for Stephen Southwold), 1937
- Cyrano de Bergerac, by Edmond Rostand

=== D ===
- Dangerous Ground, by Francis Sill Wickware, 1946
- Death of a Peer, by Ngaio Marsh, 1940
- Demelza, by Winston Graham, 1953
- Devil's Bridge, by Mary Deasy, 1953
- Don Quixote, by Miguel de Cervantes; translation by Richard Emery Roberts
- Dr. Krasinski's Secret, by M. P. Shiel, 1929

=== E ===
- Edgar Wallace, the Biography of a Phenomenon, by Margaret Lane, 1939
- Ella Gunning, by Mary Deasy, 1951
- Emma, by F.W. Kenyon, 1956
- English Comedies, edited by John Gassner
- Essays of Ralph Waldo Emerson, by Ralph Waldo Emerson
- Excelsior!, by Paul Hyde Bonner, 1956

=== F ===
- False Witness, by Irving Stone, 1940
- Family Fortunes, by Gwen Davenport, 1949
- Famous French Novels, Seven Modern Condensations, editor Cameron Hyde
- Fathers and Sons, by Ivan Turgenev
- Farewell to Valley Forge, by David Taylor, 1956
- Favorite Works of Sir Walter Scott, by Sir Walter Scott, 1942
- Fetish, by Christine Garnier, 1953
- Flamenco, by Lady Eleanor Smith, 1931
- For My Great Folly, a Novel, by Thomas B. Costain, 1942

=== G ===
- Gladiator, by Philip Gordon Wylie, 1930
- Great Expectations, by Charles Dickens
- Great Novels of Anatole France by Anatole France, 1918
- Green Mansions, by William Henry Hudson
- Gulliver's Travels, by Jonathan Swift, 1937

=== H-K ===
- Hear This Woman, by Ben and Ann Pinchot, 1951
- Hunchback of Notre Dame, by Victor Hugo
- Intruder From The Sea, by Gordon McDonell, 1954
- Jamaica Inn, by Daphne du Maurier, 1936
- Jane Eyre, by Charlotte Brontë, 1940
- Jefferson's Letters, arranged by Willson Whitman
- John Brown's Cousin, by Jane Hutchens, 1940
- Jubel's Children, by Lenard Kaufman, 1951
- Jubilee, by John Brick, 1956
- Kotto, Being Japanese Curios, by Lafcadio Hearn, 1929

=== L ===
- Lady Blanche Farm & Queen Anne's Lace, by Frances Parkinson Keyes, 1954
- Lavengro & the Romany Rye, by George Borrow
- Les Misérables, by Victor Hugo, 1943
- Living Biographies of Famous Novelists, by Henry Thomas & Dana Lee Thomas, 1943
- Lord Jim, by Joseph Conrad
- Lord Vanity, by Samuel Shellabarger, 1955
- Lorna Doone, a Romance of Exmoor, by Richard Blackmore
- Love in the Sun, by Leo Walmsley, 1940

=== M ===
- Madame Bovary, by Gustave Flaubert, 1937
- Mary Lavelle, by Kate O'Brien, 1936
- Meet Mr. Fortune, by H. C. Bailey, 1942
- Mexican Maze, by Carleton Beals, 1931 with Illustrations by Diego Rivera
- Michael Strogoff, by Jules Verne, 1940
- Mikado and Other Operas, by W. S. Gilbert, 1929
- Moby Dick, by Herman Melville, 1940
- Moonstone, by Wilkie Collins

=== N-R ===
- Nana, by Émile Zola, 1937
- O. Henry Memorial Award Prize Stories of 1941, edited by Herschell Brickell, 1941
- Plays of the Greek Dramatists, selections from Aeschylus, Sophocles, Euripides, Aristophanes
- Poems and Tales of Edgar Allan Poe, by Edgar Allan Poe
- Pride and Prejudice, by Jane Austen, 1937
- Quo Vadis, a Narrative of the Time of Nero, by Henryk Sienkiewicz; translation from the Polish by Jeremiah Curtin, 1925
- Rebecca, by Daphne du Maurier, 1938
- Road to Endor, by Esther Barstow Hammond, 1940
- Rob Roy and Selected Poems, by Sir Walter Scott
- Romola, by George Eliot
- Rubaiyat of Omar Khayam

=== S ===
- Samuel Pepys, by Arthur Ponsonby, 1929
- Sapho, by Alphonse Daudet, 1932
- Sara Dane, by Catherine Gaskin, 1955
- Science of Life, by H. G. Wells, Julian Huxley, G. P. Wells, 1936
- Selected Stories of Bret Harte, by Bret Harte
- Selected Writings of Thomas Paine, by Thomas Paine
- Selections from the Arabian Nights, translation by Sir Richard Burton
- Sense and Sensibility & Northanger Abbey, by Jane Austen
- Short Stories of de Maupassant, by Guy de Maupassant, 1941
- Short Stories of W. Somerset Maugham, by W. Somerset Maugham
- Show Boat, by Edna Ferber, 1926
- Signed with Their Honor, by James Aldridge, 1942
- Six Famous French Novels, edited by Cameron Hyde, 1943
- So Big, by Edna Ferber
- Solomon And The Queen of Sheba, by Czenzi Ormonde, 1955
- Stephania, by Ilona Karmel, 1953

=== T ===
- Tales from the Decameron, by Giovanni Boccaccio, 1930
- Tales of Mystery and Imagination, by Edgar Allan Poe, 1940
- Tender Victory, by Taylor Caldwell, 1957
- That Lofty Sky, by Henry Beetle Hough, 1941
- That None Should Die, by Frank G. Slaughter, 1941
- The Adventurers, by Ernest Haycox, 1955
- The Adventures of Baron Munchausen
- The Autobiography of Benvenuto Cellini, 1937
- The Best Known Works of Daniel Defoe, by Daniel Defoe, 1942
- The Best Known Works of Elizabeth & Robert Browning, by Robert Browning, Elizabeth Barrett Browning, 1942
- The Best Known Works of Émile Zola, by Émile Zola, 1941
- The Best Known Works of Gustave Flaubert, by Gustave Flaubert, 1941
- The Best Known Works of Ibsen, by Henrik Ibsen, 1941
- The Best Known Works of Ivan Turgenev, by Ivan Turgenev
- The Best Known Works of James Fenimore Cooper, by James Fenimore Cooper, 1942
- The Best Known Works of Nathaniel Hawthorne, by Nathaniel Hawthorne
- The Best Known Works of Oscar Wilde, by Oscar Wilde, 1940
- The Best Known Works of Ralph Waldo Emerson, by Ralph Waldo Emerson, 1941
- The Best Known Works of Robert Louis Stevenson, by Robert Louis Stevenson, 1941
- The Best Known Works of Thomas Carlyle, by Thomas Carlyle, 1942
- The Best Known Works of Voltaire, by François-Marie Arouet de Voltaire
- The Best Known Works of Washington Irving, by Washington Irving, 1942
- The Best Known Works of William Shakespeare, by William Shakespeare
- The Book of Ser Marco Polo, the Venetian, by Marco Polo, 1929
- The Chuckling Fingers, by Mabel Seeley, 1941
- The Clairvoyant, by Ernst Lothar, 1932
- The Cloister and the Hearth, by Charles Reade
- The Collected Poems of Walt Whitman, edited by Emory Holloway
- The Complete Works of Horace, edited by Casper J. Kraemer Jr., 1938
- The Corioli Affair, by Mary Deasy, 1955
- The Count of Monte Cristo, by Alexandre Dumas, père
- The Countryman's Year, by David Grayson, 1936
- The Crime of Sylvester Bonnard, by Anatole France, 1937
- The Crime Wave at Blandings, by P. G. Wodehouse, 1937
- The Dance of Life, by Havelock Ellis, 1929
- The Death of Lord Haw Haw, by Brett Rutledge (pen name of Elliot Paul), 1940
- The Decline and Fall of the Roman Empire, by Edward Gibbon
- The Diary of Samuel Pepys, edited by Isabel Ely Lord
- The Droll Stories of Honoré de Balzac, by Honoré de Balzac
- The Education of Henry Adams, by Henry Adams, 1928
- The Egoist, a Comedy in Narrative, by George Meredith, 1941
- The Essays of Elia, by Charles Lamb, 1929
- The Favorite Works of Charles Dickens, by Charles Dickens, 1942
- The Feast, by Margaret Kennedy, 1950
- The Fool Killer, by Helen Eustis, 1954
- The Foolish Immortals, by Paul Gallico, 1954
- The 4 Georges, by William Makepeace Thackeray, 1937
- The Freeholder, by Joe David Brown, 1949
- The Gentle Kingdom of Giacomo, by Evelyn Wells, 1953
- The Gypsy In The Parlour, by Margery Sharp, 1954
- The Hangman's Whip, by Mignon G. Eberhart, 1940
- The Happy Harvest, by Jeffery Farnol, 1940
- The History of Henry Esmond, by William Makepeace Thackeray
- The History of Tom Jones, by Henry Fielding
- The Hunchback of Notre Dame, by Victor Hugo
- The King's Vixen, by Pamela Hill, 1955
- The Lady Who Came to Stay, by Robin Edgerton Spencer, 1931
- The Last Days of Pompeii, by Sir Edward Bulwer-Lytton, 1st Baron Lytton
- The Life and Letters of Benjamin Franklin, by Benjamin Franklin
- The Little Ark, by Jan de Hartog, 1954
- The Long Memory, by Howard Clewes, 1952
- The Love Books of Ovid, 1937
- The Lyric South, an Anthology of Recent Poetry from the South, by Addison Hibbard, 1929
- The Master of Ballantrae, by Robert Louis Stevenson, 1931
- The Mill on the Floss, by George Eliot, 1932
- The Mixture as Before, by W. Somerset Maugham, 1940
- The Moon and Sixpence, by W. Somerset Maugham
- The Moonstone, by Wilkie Collins
- The Origin of Species, by Charles Darwin
- The Passionate Journey, by Irving Stone, 1950
- The Peaceable Kingdom, by Ardyth Kennelly, 1950
- The Picture of Dorian Gray, by Oscar Wilde
- The Pilgrim's Progress & The Holy War, by John Bunyan
- The Plays of Anton Chekhov, by Anton Chekhov
- The Portrait of a Lady, by Henry James
- The Proud Man, by Elizabeth Linington, 1956
- The Queen's Cross, by Lawrence Schoonover, 1956
- The Red Lily, by Anatole France, 1937
- The Rest of Your Life, by Leo Cherne
- The Rifleman, by John Brick, 1953
- The Return of the Native, by Thomas Hardy, 1937
- The Salem Frigate, by John Jennings, 1946
- The Selected Works of William Makepeace Thakeray, by William Makepeace Thackeray, 1942
- The Seven that were Hanged, by Leonid Andreyev, 1931
- The Shadow Catcher, by Donald Sloan
- The Sheltered Life, by Ellen Glasgow
- The Short Novels of John Steinbeck, by John Steinbeck, 1954
- The Short Stories of Guy de Maupassant, by Guy de Maupassant
- The Ship and the Shore, by Vicki Baum, 1941
- The Sundowners, by Jon Cleary, 1952
- The Temptation of St. Anthony, by Gustave Flaubert, 1936
- The Trouble in Thor, by Jo Valentine, 1954
- The Two Wives, a Tale in Four Parts, by Frank Arthur Swinnerton, 1940
- The Unvanquished, by Howard Fast, 1942
- The Velvet Doublet, by James Street, 1953
- The Vicar of Wakefield, by Oliver Goldsmith, 1939
- The Virginians, by William Makepeace Thackeray
- The Warden & Barchester Towers, by Anthony Trollope
- The Way of All Flesh, by Samuel Butler, 1937
- The Weather Tree, by Maristan Chapman (pen name of Mary Ilsley Chapman and John Stanton Higham Chapman), 1932
- The Woman Who Would Be Queen, by Geoffrey Bocca, 1955
- The World's Great Speeches, edited by Lewis Copeland, 1942
- The Young Elizabeth, by Jennette and Francis Letton (Jennette Dowling Letton and Francis Letton), 1953
- They Stooped to Folly, by Ellen Glasgow, 1929
- They Tell No Tales, by Manning Coles, 1942
- Three Great Novels of Robert Louis Stevenson, by Robert Louis Stevenson
- Three Musketeers, by Alexandre Dumas, père, 1940
- Tidefall, by Thomas H. Raddall, 1954
- Time And Time Again, by James Hilton, 1955
- Tom Sawyer and Other Sketches by Clemens, by Mark Twain
- Torch For A Dark Journey, by Lionel Shapiro, 1950
- Travellers' Tales, arranged by Jay Du Bois
- Twenty Thousand Leagues Under the Sea, by Jules Verne, 1940
- Two Came By Sea, by William S. Stone, 1953

=== U-Z ===
- Valley Of The Vines, by Joy Packer, 1956
- Vanity Fair: A Novel without a Hero, by William Makepeace Thackeray
- War And Peace, by Leo Tolstoy
- Wuthering Heights, by Emily Brontë, 1940
- Yonder, by Margaret Bell Houston, 1956

== See also ==
- Books in the United States
