= Lawrence Lamm =

Lawrence William Lamm (April 28, 1896 - August 28, 1995) was a pioneer in the U.S. book packaging industry. An editor at Macmillan, he became a founder of the Book League of America.

== Biography ==
He was born in Manhattan, New York City on April 28, 1896. He died in Stamford, Connecticut on August 28, 1995.
