= Two Little Drummer Boys =

1928 film

- Directed by: G. B. Samuelson
- Written by: Walter Howard (play)
- Produced by: John E. Blakeley
- Starring: Georgie Wood; Derrick De Marney; Alma Taylor; Paul Cavanagh
- Production company: John E. Blakeley Productions
- Distributed by: Victoria Films
- Release date: October 1928
- Running time: 7,500 feet
- Country: United Kingdom
- Languages: Silent; English intertitles

Two Little Drummer Boys is a 1928 British silent comedy film directed by G. B. Samuelson and starring Georgie Wood, Derrick De Marney and Alma Taylor. The film was based on the 1899 play Two Little Drummer Boys by Walter Howard and was shot at Southall Studios. It was produced by a forerunner of Mancunian Films.

== Cast ==
- Georgie Wood as Eric Carsdale
- Derrick De Marney as Jack Carsdale
- Alma Taylor as Alma Carsdale
- Paul Cavanagh as Captain Darrell
- Walter Byron as Captain Carsdale
- Julie Suedo as Margaret
