= The Brave Don't Cry =

1952 British film by Philip Leacock

- Directed by: Philip Leacock
- Screenplay by: Montagu Slater; Lindsay Galloway (additional dialogue)
- Produced by: John Grierson (executive producer - Group 3)
- Starring: John Gregson; Meg Buchanan; Andrew Keir
- Cinematography: Arthur Grant
- Edited by: John Trumper
- Music by: John Wooldridge
- Production company: Group 3 Films
- Distributed by: Associated British-Pathé (UK)
- Release date: August 1952 (UK)
- Running time: 89 minutes
- Country: United Kingdom
- Language: English

The Brave Don't Cry is a 1952 British drama film directed by Philip Leacock and starring John Gregson, Meg Buchanan and John Rae. The film depicts the events of September 1950 at the Knockshinnoch Castle colliery in Scotland, where 129 men were trapped by a landslide. It was shot at Southall Studios and was also known by the alternative title Knockshinnoch Story. The filmmakers used actors from the Glasgow Citizens Theatre. It was screened at the Venice Film Festival in September 1952.

== Plot ==
A group of coalminers are trapped underground after a fall.

The story follows the trapped men, their rescuers, and their families as they struggle to dig them out before the oxygen is exhausted.

A phone line exists to the trapped men.

The efforts are hampered by firedamp.

== Cast ==
- John Gregson as Dr John Cameron
- Meg Buchanan as Margaret Wishart
- John Rae as Donald Sloan
- Fulton Mackay as Dan Wishart
- Andrew Keir as Charlie Ross
- Wendy Noel as Jean Knox
- Russell Waters as Hughie Aitken
- Jameson Clark as Doctor Andrew Kerr
- Eric Woodburn as Rab Elliott
- Archie Duncan as Walter Hardie
- Jack Stewart as Willie Duncan
- Anne Butchart as Biddy Ross
- Mac Picton as Jim Knox
- Jean Anderson as Mrs. Sloan
- John Singer as Tam Stewart
- Russell Hunter as Police Sergeant
- Sam Kydd as Porter

== Production ==
It was originally known as What God Forgot. John Grierson head of Group 3 Films called the script "one of the most moving I have read for years".

The song used at the start and the end is Kishmul's Galley, a traditional Scots song.

== Critical reception ==
In a contemporary review, The Monthly Film Bulletin wrote, "in its semi-documentary, semi-impersonal way The Brave Don't Cry is an estimable achievement, effectively sustaining the dramatic tension and sketching its characters with directness and a refreshing absence of mannerisms. Its limitations are the limitations of its genre - dramatic reportage rather than personal statement, observation without passion. The method works very well for many of the scenes, but the more emotional moments tend to seem either theatrical or (as in the case of Mrs. Sloan's reunion with her husband) conventionally understated. In its genre, though, the film stands quite high, and it gains greatly from the use of unfamiliar players. There are particularly good performances from Fulton Mackay, Jameson Clark, Jean Anderson and John Rae; and the folk song used over the credits and at the end - there is no background music - is highly effective."

== Bibliography ==
- Harper, Sue & Porter, Vincent. British Cinema of the 1950s: The Decline of Deference. Oxford University Press, 2007.
