= The Long Memory =

1953 British film by Robert Hamer

- Original British 1953 quad film poster
- Directed by: Robert Hamer
- Screenplay by: Robert Hamer; Frank Harvey
- Based on: The Long Memory by Howard Clewes
- Produced by: Hugh Stewart
- Starring: John Mills; John McCallum; Elizabeth Sellars; Eva Bergh
- Cinematography: Harry Waxman
- Edited by: Gordon Hales
- Music by: William Alwyn
- Production companies: Europa Films; British Film-Makers
- Distributed by: General Film Distributors (UK); Universal (USA)
- Release dates: 23 January 1953 (UK); October 1954 (USA)
- Running time: 96 minutes
- Country: United Kingdom
- Language: English
- Box office: £110,000

The Long Memory is a black-and-white 1953 British crime film directed by Robert Hamer, starring John Mills, John McCallum and Elizabeth Sellars. The screenplay was by Hamer and Frank Harvey based on the 1951 novel The Long Memory by Howard Clewes.

Its bleak setting and grim atmosphere have led to its acclaim as a British example of film noir.

== Plot ==
Phillip Davidson boards a boat and embraces Fay Driver. Then he goes down below to try to convince her alcoholic father, Captain Driver, not to involve Fay in his criminal activity. However, Boyd brings aboard Delaney (a man he has agreed to smuggle out of the country) and two henchmen. When Boyd demands that Delaney pay him £500, rather than £200, a fight erupts, and Boyd knocks Delaney out. A broken oil lamp starts a fire, attracting the attention of the authorities, and Philip is fished out of the water. A charred corpse is found in the sunken boat. The Drivers and Tim Pewsey perjure themselves by identifying the dead man as Boyd, rather than Delaney, and claiming there was no other man present. This leads to Philip's conviction for Boyd's murder. Granted parole, he is released after 12 years in prison.

Upon release, he sets out to get even with the witnesses. He is kept under surveillance by the police on the orders of Superintendent Bob Lowther, who is now married to Fay. Philip finds an abandoned barge claimed by Jackson, a kindly old hermit. His plan is to live rough on the barge while he searches for the witnesses. But three people attempt – initially unsuccessfully – to befriend him. First, Jackson withdraws an initial request for rent. Then Craig, a newspaperman who suspects him to be innocent, arrives; Philip throws him out, but Craig tumbles down an open hatch and is knocked unconscious, and Philip rescues him. Finally, he happens upon a sailor attempting to rape Ilse, a traumatised refugee. When he rescues her and allows her to stay on the barge, she falls in love with him.

Informed by Craig that Captain Driver has died, four years earlier, Philip stalks Pewsey, with Lowther and Craig on his trail. Pewsey is frightened into confessing to Lowther that there was another man present at the murder. Now Lowther's marriage comes under increasing tension as he considers the possibility of his wife's perjury. Finally, she confesses she did lie to protect her father. Lowther tells her that she will have to turn herself in and he will have to resign. She asks for time, and goes to see "George Berry", who turns out to be Boyd. She asks him for money in order to leave the country and avoid the perjury charge.

Ilse pleads with Philip to give up his dream of revenge and start a new life with her. He confronts Fay in her home, but realises that Ilse is right, and walks away.

When Fay realises Boyd is not coming, she attempts suicide by trying to jump in front of an oncoming Waterloo & City line train, but is stopped by other people on the platform. She leaves with police sent by her husband after he read her farewell note.

By sheer chance, Philip is then hired to deliver an urgent letter to "Berry". Philip confronts Boyd in his office, who initially attempts to use a gun, but Philip knocks this aside and they fight. Philip overcomes Boyd, begins beating him in revenge but realises revenge is pointless and leaves. Boyd recovers, picks up the gun and follows Philip. It is time for Boyd to meet Fay at London Waterloo railway station, but he pursues Philip and shoots him in the arm.

Philip flees to the barge, but Boyd is waiting for him. After a chase, Boyd is about to kill Philip when he is shot dead by Jackson.

Ilse and Philip refuse further help from the police. They are left to deal with their pasts and face the future together.

== Cast ==
- John Mills as Phillip Davidson
- John McCallum as Superintendent Bob Lowther
- Elizabeth Sellars as Fay Lowther
- Eva Bergh as Ilse
- Geoffrey Keen as Craig, a newspaperman
- Michael Martin Harvey as Jackson
- John Chandos as Spencer Boyd, alias George Berry
- John Slater as Tim Pewsey
- Thora Hird as Mrs Pewsey
- Vida Hope as Alice Gedge
- Harold Lang as Boyd's chauffeur/receptionist
- Mary Mackenzie as Gladys
- John Glyn-Jones as Gedge
- John Horsley as Bletchley
- Fred Johnson as Driver
- Laurence Naismith as Hasbury
- Peter Jones as Fisher, another reporter
- Christopher Beeny as Mickey, the Lowthers' son
- Ernest Clark as Prosecuting Counsel (uncredited)
- Henry Edwards as Judge (uncredited)
- Arthur Mullard as Police Constable (uncredited)
- Denis Shaw as Shaw (uncredited)
- Julian Somers as Delaney (uncredited)
- Russell Waters as Scotson (uncredited)

== Production ==
=== Development ===
The novel was published in 1951. Film rights were bought by producer Hugh Stewart, who made the film through his company, Europa.

The film was financed through British Film-Makers, a short lived production scheme that operated in Britain in the early 1950s as a co operative venture between the Rank Organisation and the National Film Finance Corporation (NFFC), whereby Rank would provide 70% of finance and the rest came from the NFFC. (Although the film was not formally credited as a "British Film Makers" movie.) The film was one of several thrillers made by British Film-Makers.

Stewart recalled, "John Davis [head of Rank] wanted all producers to be independent, so the Rank Organisation made a deal with Europa Films (my own company) to hire my services, hence every film I made was made through Europa. It was always ‘The Rank Organisation presents ...’ on the credits but it was called ‘Hugh Stewart Productions’, I always got that. John Davis was a very tough character but I got on very well with him. I never tried to bluff him or toady to him."

Stewart said he wanted to cast John McCallum as the detective because "I knew his face would express the terrible anguish in his instinctive knowledge that his wife was lying."

=== Shooting ===
The film was shot in June 1952.

The film was made at Pinewood Studios and on location in the North Kent Marshes on the Thames Estuary, around Gravesend, and at Shad Thames, a street next to Tower Bridge in central London. Many of the houses shown in the film were demolished soon afterwards.

It was the last film of Henry Edwards, a major British star of the 1920s and 1930s, who had a small role as a judge early in the film.

Stewart said "Robert [Hamer] at this stage was an alcoholic, it was terrible. The film was a mediocre success and I think Hamer made it as good as it could be. At his best he was brilliant. What he liked doing was something like Kind Hearts and Coronets, which was extremely stylish, something for an élite audience."

John Mills called the movie "an extremely good thriller, which would have been even better if our director could have stayed off the juice. Bob Hamer had done some brilliant work at Ealing for Sir Michael Balcon, but by the time The Long Memory arrived his great talent had been blunted. Twice, during nightshooting on a barge in the Thames, he fell in the river walking backwards with a viewfinder glued to his eye."

== Release ==
The film received its gala premiere at the Leicester Square Theatre on 22 January 1953, with Prince Henry, Duke of Gloucester and Princess Alice, Duchess of Gloucester as guests of honour, and entered general release the following day.

Frank Godwin, assistant to Earl St John, called it "a very good but rather downbeat film." At the premiere Godwin recalled St John "sunk lower and lower in his seat and, at the end, he slowly eased himself up, put his arm around the producer Hugh Stewart's shoulder and said: 'Well, kid, I guess we've gotta sell this film on its merits'."

== Reception ==
=== Box office ===
Producer Hugh Stewart said "I thought it was rather good but it didn't do that well." According to Rank's internal records, the movie's box office performance was "poor" and earned billings of £110,000.

=== Critical reception ===
Variety called it "a conventional type of suspense thriller with a familiar plot tautly presented. With the name of John Mills for the marquee, it should qualify for steady grosses in the home market where it has the added virtue of a quota ticket. It falls into a more modest groove for American theatres, but may chatk up average grosses."

The Monthly Film Bulletin wrote: "The story of The Long Memory is one of improbable if ingenious contrivance; one might have expected a fast and fairly exciting melodrama to have been made from it. The director, however, has chosen a slow, slightly portentous and fairly inflexible style with which to frame his events; he has spot-lighted characters and motivations and, by doing so, exposed them. For the truth is that the people are superficially and unconvincingly drawn, and further handicapped by some undistinguished acting. The attempt at a Quai des Brumes (1938) atmosphere barge setting, the outcasts' shack, the love affair of the embittered man and the pathetic refugee – appears strained and unreal. Some good small-part acting (by Vida Hope, Thora Hird, Geoffrey Keen and Harold Lang) and the excellent location work in and around Gravesend are not enough to disguise a confected intrigue among wooden characters. There are obviously intelligent talents at work, but they are misapplied."

Screenonline wrote, "visually it is an extraordinary film, which makes exciting use of the desolate landscape around the Thames estuary" and which is "uncompromising in its treatment of human suffering and injustice."

Philip Kemp argued, "Mills does a staunch professional job, giving us the tenacity but missing the malevolence; the role calls for a cold, harsh venom that isn’t within the actor’s compass. What makes The Long Memory worth seeing is spirit of place: its exceptional use of landscape." He wrote the film "is a film of acutely captured detail — tacky, sleazy detail for the most part. A decade before the trumpeted naturalism of the British New Wave, Hamer was exploring townscapes far from the official picturepostcard locations" and "The plot of The Long Memory fades fast from the mind, but its texture stays vividly with you." The Radio Times Guide to Films gave the film 2/5 stars, writing: "Robert Hamer will always be remembered as the director of the classic Ealing comedy Kind Hearts and Coronets (1949), but he also had an excellent eye for local detail. Here he cleverly captures the murky side of life in London's marshlands, but he is beaten from the start by the utterly predictable wrong man story. John Mills is badly miscast as an old lag desperate to discover who framed him for murder, while detective John McCallum is clueless."

In British Sound Films: The Studio Years 1928–1959 David Quinlan rated the film as "average", writing: "Tough, but slow and disjointed."

The Times film reviewer found the film a bit dull and self-important, but gave director Hamer credit for "effective use of the film's natural background, the mud and desolation of the flats of the Thames Estuary."

== Notes ==
- Kemp, Philip (2003). "The Long Shadow: Robert Hamer after Ealing". British cinema of the 1950s - A celebration. Manchester University Press. p. 74-86.
- Murphy, Robert (2005). "The Long Memory". The cinema of Britain and Ireland. p. 85-94.
