= Manuel del Campo =

Mexican film editor (1913–1969)

- Born: Manuel Martínez del Campo y Cuevas; 14 November 1913; Mexico City, Mexico
- Died: 16 February 1969 (aged 55); London, England
- Occupation: Film editor
- Spouse: Mary Astor (1936–1941) (divorced)

Manuel Martínez del Campo y Cuevas (14 November 1913 – 16 February 1969) was a Mexican film editor working in Hollywood and British film.

== Early life ==
Manuel Martínez del Campo y Cuevas was born on 14 November 1913 in Mexico City. He was the son of Manuel Martínez del Campo y Lynch and Mercedes Cuevas. His father was an Irish Mexican diplomat who had only arrived in Mexico ten years earlier, aged twenty, from London where his own father had headed the Mexican Embassy. In 1914 he moved to New York after his father was posted to the Mexican consulate in New York City where he was to help organize the Niagara Falls peace conference.

Del Campo was brought up in Brooklyn. Around 1916, his father was recruited by Sir William Wiseman, an old acquaintance of his, to join the New York station of MI1c, section V (later known as Secret Intelligence Service or MI6), which had the specific mission of “campaigning against German operations in the US as well as the Irish and Indian nationalists with whom the Germans plotted”.

As his father before him, del Campo was educated at Clifton College.

== Mary Astor and later life ==
Wanting to become an actor, del Campo went to California in 1935, where he soon met Mary Astor. In a ceremony kept secret from the press and his family, del Campo married Astor in 1936, becoming her third husband. Together they had a son, Anthony Paul "Tono" del Campo.

In 1941, del Campo joined the newly formed No. 415 Squadron RCAF as a Flight lieutenant. The squadron was stationed at Thorney Island and was armed with Hampdens.

As a result of del Campo's enlistment the couple drifted apart, and divorced amicably in 1941. The marriage, although hardly a success, was a happy one. Astor would later recall Manuel, or "Mike" as she called him, as a kind and decent man, albeit an irresponsible one as well, as he rarely contacted her or their son after the war.

After the Second World War ended, del Campo stayed in the UK, where he married two more times. He worked as an editor until his death in 1969 in London.

== Partial filmography ==
- The Adventures of Long John Silver (1958-59 - five episodes)
- His Majesty O'Keefe (1954)
- Miss Robin Hood (1952)
- No Highway in the Sky (1951)
- The Black Rose (1950)
- No Orchids for Miss Blandish (1948)
