= Cheer the Brave =

1951 British film by Kenneth Hume

- Opening titles
- Directed by: Kenneth Hume
- Written by: Kenneth Hume
- Produced by: John Sutro; David Webster
- Starring: Elsie Randolph; Jack McNaughton; Geoffrey Keen
- Production company: SWH-Piccadilly
- Distributed by: Apex Film Distributors
- Release date: August 1951
- Running time: 62 minutes
- Country: United Kingdom
- Language: English

Cheer the Brave is a 1951 British second feature ('B') comedy film directed and written by Kenneth Hume and starring Elsie Randolph, Jack McNaughton and Geoffrey Keen. It was made at Southall Studios.

== Plot ==
A mild-mannered man gets married, but soon finds his new wife to be a domineering tyrant. After discovering her previous husband is not really dead, he manages to escape from her clutches.

== Cast ==
- Elsie Randolph as Doris Wilson
- Jack McNaughton as Bill Potter
- Geoffrey Keen as Wilson
- Marie Ault as mother-in-law
- Vida Hope
- Mavis Villiers
- Eileen Way
- Gordon Mulholland
- Sam Kydd
- Rose Howlett
- Helen Goss
- Michael Ward
- John Bull
- Elizabeth Saunders
- Jennifer Duncan
- Molly Weir

== Reception ==
Kine Weekly wrote: "The picture fails to cover new ground, but the familiar domestic gags, confidently put over by the co-stars and Marie Ault, cast as the tippling mother-in-law, still manage to click. The "twist" ending is no surprise, but it also registers. The one snag is the footage, the frolic is a little on the long side."

In The British 'B' Movie, Steve Chibnall and Brian McFarlane call the film a "dim tale".

In British Sound Films: The Studio Years 1928–1959 David Quinlan rated the film as "average", writing: "Competent comedy."
