= Green Grow the Rushes (novel) =

1949 novel

- First Edition Cover
- Author: Howard Clewes
- Language: English
- Genre: Comedy
- Publisher: The Bodley Head
- Publication date: 1949
- Publication place: United Kingdom
- Media type: Print

Green Grow the Rushes is a 1949 comedy novel by the British writer Howard Clewes. The title refers to the traditional folk song "Green Grow the Rushes, O". It revolves around a group of officials from a Whitehall government department who travel to the Kent coast for an investigation, only to find themselves encountering a community entirely committed to smuggling.

It was adapted into a 1951 British film of the same title directed by Derek N. Twist and starring Roger Livesey, Honor Blackman and Richard Burton.

== Bibliography ==
- Goble, Alan. The Complete Index to Literary Sources in Film. Walter de Gruyter, 1999.
