= Jack McNaughton =

British actor (1905–1990)

- Born: 22 December 1905; Mitcham, Surrey, England
- Died: 22 February 1990 (aged 84); Cambridgeshire, England
- Occupation: Actor
- Years active: 1939–1963 (film & TV)

Jack McNaughton (22 December 1905 – 22 February 1990) was a British stage and film actor. As a character actor he mostly played supporting roles, but occasionally featured in major roles such as playing the male lead in the 1951 comedy Cheer the Brave.

He was married to the Canadian-born actress Kay Callard.

== Selected filmography ==
- They Made Me a Fugitive (1947) – Soapy
- Brighton Rock (1948) – Trudy brother – pierrot (uncredited)
- London Belongs to Me (1948) – Jimmy
- The Guinea Pig (1948) – (uncredited)
- Brass Monkey (1948) – Porter
- Badger's Green (1949) – Mr. Twigg
- Cardboard Cavalier (1949) – Uriah Group
- Man on the Run (1949) – First Man at Soho Pub
- Madness of the Heart (1949) – Attendant
- No Place for Jennifer (1950) – Coffee Stall Attendant
- Her Favourite Husband (1950) – El Greco
- She Shall Have Murder (1950) – Barman
- The Man in the White Suit (1951) – Taxi Driver
- Cheer the Brave (1951) – Bill Potter
- Green Grow the Rushes (1951) – Bailiff Sgt. Edgar Rigby
- High Treason (1951) – Benson – Scotland Yard Man (uncredited)
- Young Wives' Tale (1951) – Cab driver
- Secret People (1952) – Postman
- No Haunt for a Gentleman (1952) – Fitz-Cholmondley
- The Hour of 13 (1952) – Ford
- Trent's Last Case (1952) – Martin
- The Pickwick Papers (1952) – Mr. Nupkins
- Time Bomb (1953) – Briggs (uncredited)
- Rough Shoot (1953) – Inspector Matthews
- The Million Pound Note (1954) – Williams (uncredited)
- River Beat (1954) – Hickson
- Father Brown (1954) – Railway Guard
- The Purple Plain (1954) – Sgt. Ralph Brown (uncredited)
- The Men of Sherwood Forest (1954) – Outlaw
- Children Galore (1955) – Pat Ark
- The Dam Busters (1955) – Waiter (uncredited)
- Postmark for Danger (1955)
- Dial 999 (1955) – Plainclothes Officer (uncredited)
- Lost (1956) – Hotel Porter (uncredited)
- Private's Progress (1956) – Medical Orderly (uncredited)
- The Long Arm (1956) – Newspaper Circulation Manager (Manchester) (uncredited)
- Town on Trial (1957) – Police Station Sergeant (uncredited)
- After the Ball (1957)
- Lady of Vengeance (1957) – Coroner
- The Camp on Blood Island (1958) – First Prisoner
- Up the Creek (1958) – Regulating Petty Officer
- Tread Softly Stranger (1958) – Workman
- The Rough and the Smooth (1959) – Bartender (uncredited)
- Expresso Bongo (1959) – Jack – Journalist (uncredited)
- The Stranglers of Bombay (1959) – Corp. Roberts (uncredited)
- The Flesh and the Fiends (1960) – Stallholder (uncredited)
- The Court Martial of Major Keller (1961) – Miller

== Bibliography ==
- Michael F. Keaney. British Film Noir Guide. McFarland, 2008.
