= The Three Musketeers (1974 film) =

- French theatrical release poster
- Directed by: John Halas; Franco Cristofani
- Written by: Howard Clewes; Patrick Wachsberger
- Based on: The Three Musketeers by Alexandre Dumas
- Produced by: Gabriele Crisanti; Luigi Nannerini; Steven Pallos; Geoffrey Verey; Patrick Wachsberger; Paolo Di Girolamo
- Edited by: Tony Anscombe; Mariano Arditi; Michael Crouch
- Music by: Michel Polnareff
- Production companies: Michelangelo Cinematografica; Pendennis Films Ltd. Educational Film Centre; Cristofani Films; Mothership Studios
- Release dates: 15 August 1974 (Germany); 19 June 1981 (United States)
- Running time: 85 minutes
- Countries: Italy; United Kingdom
- Language: English

The Three Musketeers, also known as The Glorious Musketeers in the UK, is an Italian-British 1974 animated adventure film, directed by animators John Halas and Franco Cristofani. It is based on Alexandre Dumas's classic French novel, The Three Musketeers, first published in 1844.

== Plot ==
d'Artagnan, on his way to an academy in Paris, has his letter of invitation stolen during a battle with the Comte de Rochefort. Though he is admitted anyway, his pursuit of Rochefort leads to disputes with three of King Louis XIII's musketeers: Athos, Porthos and Aramis. They all arrange to settle their honour with d'Artagnan at the same time at the Luxembourg Palace, though eventually join sides to battle the Cardinal Richelieu's soldiers, striking up a friendship. d’Artagnan also develops a romantic relationship with Queen Anne's aide Constance.

Richelieu, meanwhile, manipulates the King into commanding the Queen to wear a diamond jewellery set at an upcoming royal ball - that she has given to the Duke of Buckingham in England. Behind His Majesty's back, he then orders Milady de Winter to get there first and steal the diamonds; the Queen sends for d'Artagnan, and eventually the other musketeers, to retrieve them for her. They prove too late to stop Milady, but the Duke decides to create an identical copy which they return to France with. After a final encounter with Rochefort, the musketeers ensure that the Queen wears these at the ball, thwarting Richelieu.

== Cast ==
From right to left: D'Artagnan, Aramis, Porthos, and Athos.

Character	English	French Dub
d'Artagnan	John Fortune	Francis Perrin
Aramis	Maurice Denham	Michel Duchaussoy
Porthos	Peter Bull	Claude Bertrand
Athos	Howard Clewes	Michel Elias
Cardinal Richelieu	Maurice Denham	Philippe Clay
King Louis XIII	Roy Kinnear	Fred Pasquali
Milady	Adrienne Corri	Perrette Pradier
Constance Bonacieux	Madeline Smith	Anna Gaylor
Queen Anne	Joyce Windsor	Unknown
Duke of Buckingham	Howard Clewes	Unknown
Rochefort	Peter Hawkins	André Valmy
Owl	Peter Hawkins	Peter Hawkins

== Release ==
In the UK, the film aired on BBC Two on 29 December 1978. In the United States, the film was distributed by National Telefilm Associates. It was released on VHS by Children's Video Library in 1981, and Celebrity Home Entertainment in 1991. To date, the only DVD release of the English dub available is a Greek region 2 one by third-party company Cine Net Entertainment featuring both English and Greek audio tracks.

=== Italy ===
A different version was first released in Italy in 1977, titled Viva D'Artagnan, created by Aldo Frollini and Giovanni Brusatori. It features music sung by Cugini di campagna, with lyrics by Bruno Zambrini and Gianni Zambrini. There's also an opening scene added, in which the film's comic relief owl starts narrating the story throughout the rest of the film. It was released on VHS by Playtime Home Video.

== Accolades ==
The film won a Special Prize at the Giffoni Film Festival in 1978.

== Music ==
A soundtrack album was released on LP vinyl by Philips in 1974. The same year, a version of the album with a gatefold sleeve and a booklet was released. A 2-disc compilation promo CD by Warner Chappell Music entitled Cinema, was released in 2007, featuring tracks 5, 19 and 20. Tracks 1 and 6 were released for streaming on 19 December 2014. Tracks 2, 5, 9, 10, 12, 13, 14, 19 and 20 were also included in another compilation album, Le Cinéma De Polnareff, released by Universal Music France in 2011. In this album, Wake Up, It's A Lovely Day and Freedom and Liberty, re-recorded versions of Et Hop On Va Tout Changer and Pour Vivre En Liberté for the English dub are included, with lyrics by Martin Shaer.

Fonit Cetra released in 1977 a soundtrack album of Viva D'Artagnan on a 7-inch single vinyl, featuring two songs. A year later, it released a compilation children's album on LP vinyl, called Supersigle tv, including the first song.

=== Track listing ===
The album is split in two vinyl discs, one for tracks 1 to 10, and another one for tracks 11 to 20. Lyrics by Michel Polnareff and Pierre Grosz (tracks 1 and 11).

No.	Title	Length
1.	"Et Hop On Va Tout Changer"	2:10
2.	"La Valse"	1:55
3.	"Moog"	2:05
4.	"Menuet De Buckingham"	1:09
5.	"Thème Des Trois Mousquetaires"	1:10
6.	"Thème De Constance"	1:00
7.	"Armée Anglaise"	0:23
8.	"Menuet Du Roi"	1:12
9.	"Thème Du Roi"	0:45
10.	"Les Méchants"	2:34
11.	"Pour Vivre En Liberté"	3:30
12.	"Thème D'Amour De Constance"	2:00
13.	"Cavalcade De D'Artagnan"	2:10
14.	"La Chouette"	0:45
15.	"La Peur"	0:52
16.	"Thème De D'Artagnan"	1:16
17.	"Lever De Soleil"	0:20
18.	"Musique De La Mer"	0:22
19.	"Thème De La Reine"	0:45
20.	"La Chevauchée Et Le Combat"	3:10
Total length:		29:33
