= Police Dog (film) =

- Directed by: Derek Twist
- Written by: Derek Twist
- Produced by: Harold Huth
- Starring: Joan Rice; Tim Turner; Sandra Dorne
- Cinematography: Cedric Williams
- Edited by: Gordon Pilkington
- Music by: Bretton Byrd
- Production company: Douglas Fairbanks Productions (as Westridge Fairbanks)
- Distributed by: Eros Films (UK)
- Release date: May 1955 (UK)
- Running time: 70 minutes
- Country: United Kingdom
- Language: English

Police Dog is a 1955 British second feature ('B') crime film directed and written by Derek Twist and starring Charles Victor, Nora Gordon, Cecil Brock, John Le Mesurier, James Gilbert, and Christopher Lee.

== Plot ==
Constables Mason and Lade spot a burglar leaving the scene of the crime and both give chase, but Lade is badly shot by the burglar before Mason can catch up. Back at the police station Mason befriends Rex, a stray Alsatian dog recently brought in by another officer. Now living abroad, its owners agree to donate it to the police and it and Mason begin training together, causing tensions back home with Mason's girlfriend Pat Lewis, daughter of his landlady and her late policeman husband – Pat resents being unable to treat Rex as a pet and his drawing Mason's attention away from their relationship. Rex and Mason complete their training and go on patrol on the streets of Hampstead.

In the meantime, Lade has died of his injuries and his killer continues to lie low, taking on temporary work at a builder's until the CID arrive and he has to flee. Mason and Pat's relationship becomes more and more strained and he decides to move himself and Rex out. Soon afterwards he and Rex are deployed to a factory where Hill's still-armed killer is breaking into a safe. They pursue him, with Rex holding onto the killer long enough to make an arrest. Meaning to meet Mason for a final discussion about their relationship, Pat arrives at the crime scene and instead reconciles with both Mason and Rex.

== Cast ==
- Joan Rice as Pat Lewis
- Tim Turner as Frank Mason
- Sandra Dorne as the Blonde
- Charles Victor as Sergeant
- Rex III as the dog
- Nora Gordon as Mrs Lewis
- Cecil Brock as crook
- John Le Mesurier as C.I.D. inspector
- James Gilbert as Police Constable Lade
- Christopher Lee as Police Constable Johnny
- Ian Fleming as man on the heath

== Production ==
The film was made at National Studios in Borehamwood England, and on location. A collection of then-and-now location stills and corresponding contemporary photographs is hosted at reelstreets.com.

== Critical reception ==
The Monthly Film Bulletin wrote: "Artlessly and unpretentiously made, this is a mildly pleasing little thriller. Its main attraction – particularly for young audiences – is the dog star, and the illustration of the methods used in training him."

Kine Weekly wrote: "The picture, although made with the full co-operation of the authorities, fails fully to convince, but at least it ends in exciting style. Joan Rice has little to do as Pat, Tim Turner lacks experience as Frank, and Cecil Brock and Sandra Dorne fall short of demands as the killer and his moll respectively. The rest of the humans are equally transparent, but Rex undoubtedly does his stuff. In a word, the film is made, or, rather, saved by the pooch."

TV Guide noted an "average police drama, produced under the auspices of Douglas Fairbanks, Jr.'s, production company."

Radio Times called the film a "competent quota quickie...It's hardly a baffling mystery even Scooby-Doo would have sussed it! However, it's always nice to see class acts like John Le Mesurier and Christopher Lee, no matter how briefly."
