= Norman Collins =

British writer and radio/TV executive (1907–1982)

- Born: 3 October 1907; Beaconsfield, Buckinghamshire, England
- Died: 6 September 1982 (aged 74); London, England
- Education: William Ellis School
- Known for: Founding Associated Television
- Title: Controller of BBC Television Service (1947–1950)

Norman Richard Collins (3 October 1907 – 6 September 1982) was a British writer, and later a radio and television executive, who became one of the major figures behind the establishment of the Independent Television (ITV) network in the UK. This was the first organisation to break the BBC's broadcasting monopoly when it began transmitting in 1955.

== Early life ==
Only son and youngest of three children of publisher's clerk and illustrator Oliver Norman Collins (d. 1917/18) and Lizzie Ethel (née Nicholls), Collins was born at Beaconsfield. He had a French-Huguenot background on his father's side and Welsh farming stock on his mother's. He was educated at a school founded by William Ellis at Gospel Oak, Hampstead.

== Early career in publishing, the press and the BBC ==
Collins left the British education system aged eighteen, and began his career as an editorial assistant at the Oxford University Press in London. He left this job in 1930 after a dispute over his low salary. He went on to work under Robert Lynd as a literary editor on the London News Chronicle newspaper and also had a spell as literary editor of the Daily News. At the age of 23 he joined Victor Gollancz's publishing firm that was founded in 1927, where he became deputy chairman. In 1941 he joined the BBC as an assistant in the Overseas Talks Department, and then as a producer for BBC Radio.

Meanwhile, he wrote novels, publishing several successful works such as London Belongs to Me (which was later filmed) in the 1930s and 1940s. After 1935 he worked in broadcasting as a producer for BBC Radio. In 1946 he was appointed Controller of the Light Programme, the BBC's more populist, entertainment-based radio service which had grown out of the BBC Forces Programme first established to entertain allied troops, but which had also become hugely popular with domestic audiences, during the Second World War.

At the Light Programme he created two of the most iconic programmes in the history of British radio broadcasting. The first of these was the adventure series Dick Barton: Special Agent, which ran for 711 episodes between 1946 and 1951, following the adventures of a dashing secret agent. The series, broadcast in the early evening just after the main news bulletin, was phenomenally popular and drew 15 million listeners at its peak, being fondly remembered and occasionally revived for many years afterwards. The second famous programme Collins initiated was the notably long-lived Woman's Hour, first broadcast in 1946 and still running every weekday on BBC Radio 4.

Collins' huge success as Controller of the Light Programme led to his appointment in 1947 as Controller of the BBC Television Service, during which time it began to take its first steps into becoming a truly mass medium, with television licence numbers breaking into six figures for the first time. This was helped by the extension of broadcasting beyond London with the opening of transmitters in other major cities such as Birmingham, and also by the appeal of the programming Collins and his team were able to offer. Perhaps the high point of his time in control of the channel was the broadcasting live on television of much of the 1948 Olympic Games, being held predominantly in London at Wembley Stadium, where the majority of the BBC's television cameras were placed for the duration of the games.

Despite a generally successful tenure as Controller, Collins resigned from the BBC in October 1950, when one of the corporation's radio executives, George Barnes, was appointed as his superior – he believed that he, as Controller of Television, should not have to answer to a man whose background was in sound broadcasting. Collins left the BBC with a strong desire to see the establishment of a televisual competitor to the corporation, which since the 1920s had held a complete monopoly on broadcasting in the UK, both radio and television.

== Campaigning for competition ==
To this end, Collins and some financial backers established a company called High Definition Films Limited in 1951, the stated aim of which was to improve the telerecording process (by which television programmes were recorded onto film for repeat broadcasts, sales or posterity), but which in reality functioned as an official group to lobby for competition in television broadcasting.

In 1953, Collins and two of his business partners – Robert Renwick and C.O. Stanley (of the Pye electronics firm) – together with several others, formed the Popular Television Association, campaigning more publicly for the establishment of an independent broadcaster, writing to the government to point out the inherent dangers of a single broadcaster holding a monopoly as the BBC did, and making an equally strong campaign in the press. Their lobbying was successful, and in early 1954 the government passed the Television Act, which opened the way for the creation of the new network under the auspices of the newly formed Independent Television Authority (ITA).

== Founding ATV ==
When the ITA invited bids from interested companies for the various local franchises that would make up the ITV network, Collins, Renwick and Stanley formed a new company, Associated Broadcasting Development Company Limited (ABDC) to apply for one of the franchises. ABDC's bid was reliant on them winning the main London franchise – at this time, the ITV franchises for the major regions (London, Midlands and the North) were split into two, one for Mondays to Fridays and one for weekends. However, when they won only the London weekend and Midlands Monday to Friday licences, their backers withdrew and the ITA prohibited Collins and his colleagues accepting extra funding from the Daily Express newspaper.

An answer was found in the form of a merger with Lew Grade's ITC Entertainment, which had failed to win a franchise of its own as the ITA was afraid such a powerful organisation would dominate the other network companies. The new company thus formed was initially called the Associated Broadcasting Company (ABC), but rival franchise holder the Associated British Picture Corporation pointed out that they already held rights to the name ABC (which they wished to use for ABC Weekend TV), so Associated TeleVision (ATV) was decided upon as a substitute.

Collins took on the role of Deputy Chairman of ATV, but was effectively sidelined by the force of personality of the company's other senior directors, Prince Littler and Lew Grade.

== Personal life ==
In 1931 Collins married actress Sarah Helen, daughter of Arthur Francis Martin; they had two daughters and one son.

== Bibliography ==
- The Facts of Fiction – 1932 (Gollancz) US: 1933 (Dutton)
- Penang Appointment – 1934 (Gollancz) US: 1935 (Doubleday)
- The Three Friends – 1935 (Gollancz) US: 1936 (Doubleday)
- Trinity Town – 1936 (Gollancz) US: 1937 (Harper)
- Flames Coming Out of the Top – 1937 (Gollancz) US: 1938 (Harper)
- Love in Our Time – 1938 (Gollancz) US: 1938 (Harper)
- I Shall Not Want – 1940 (Gollancz) US: 1940 (Harper) as Gold for My Bride
- Anna – 1942 (Gollancz) US: 1942 (Harper) as The Quiet Lady
- London Belongs to Me – 1945 (Gollancz) US; 1947 (Harper) as Dulcimer Street
- Black Ivory – 1948 (Gollancz) US: 1948 (Pearce)
- Children of the Archbishop – 1951 (Gollancz) US: 1951 (Duell)
- The Bat that Flits – 1952 (Collins) US: 1952 (Sloan)
- Bond Street Story – 1958 (Collins) US: 1959 (Harpers)
- The Governor's Lady – 1968 (Collins) US: 1969 (Schuster)
- The Husband's Story – 1978 (Collins) US: 1978 (Atheneum)
- Little Nelson – 1981 (Collins)

Media offices
Preceded by Maurice Gorham	Controller of BBC Television Service; 1947–1950	Succeeded by Cecil McGivern
