= Russell Waters =

Scottish actor (1908–1982)

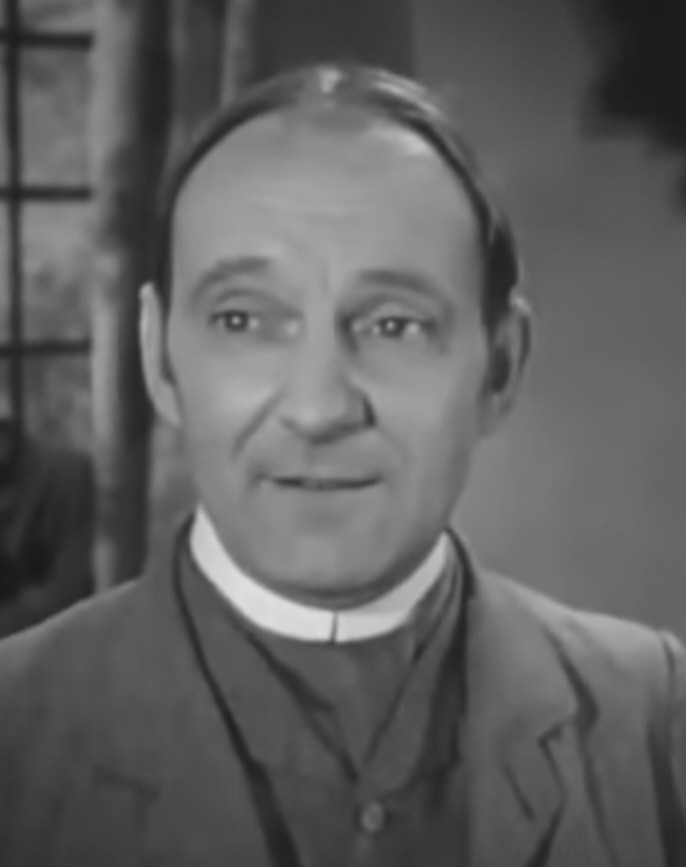
- Russell Waters in an episode of TV series Sherlock Holmes (1954)
- Born: 10 June 1908; Glasgow, Scotland
- Died: 19 August 1982 (aged 74); Richmond, London, England
- Education: University of Glasgow
- Occupation: Actor
- Years active: ?-1979
- Family: John Waters (son)

Russell Waters (10 June 1908 – 19 August 1982) was a Scottish-born stage and screen actor, known for his roles in British film.

== Biography ==
Waters was educated at Hutchesons' Grammar School, Glasgow and then attended the University of Glasgow.

He began acting with the Old English Comedy and Shakespeare Company then appeared in repertory theatre, at the Old Vic and in the West End.

On screen Waters generally found himself playing mild-mannered characters. He played the leading man in Richard Massingham's amusing instructional short subjects, among them Tell Me If It Hurts (1936), And So Work (1937), The Daily Round (1947) and What a Life! (1948).

In feature films, Waters played secondary roles such as Craggs in The Blue Lagoon (1949), Mr. West in The Happiest Days of Your Life, Palmer in Chance of a Lifetime and "Wings" Cameron in The Wooden Horse (all three in 1950). In later years, he was briefly seen as the harbour master in The Wicker Man (1973), and his final film role was as Dr. Jones in Ken Loach's Black Jack in 1979.

Among Waters' television appearances was that of an aggrieved butler, Stephens, in a 1965 episode of The Human Jungle (starring Herbert Lom).

== Selected filmography ==
- The Woman in the Hall (1947) – Alfred
- London Belongs to Me (1948) – Clerk of the Court
- Once a Jolly Swagman (1949) – Mr. Pusey
- The Blue Lagoon (1949) – Craggs
- Marry Me! (1949) – Mr. Pearson
- Obsession (1949) – Flying Squad detective
- Dear Mr. Prohack (1949) – Cartwright
- The Happiest Days of Your Life (1950) – Mr. West
- Chance of a Lifetime (1950) – Palmer
- State Secret (1950) – Clubman
- The Wooden Horse (1950) – 'Wings' Cameron
- Seven Days to Noon (1950) – Det. Davis
- The Magnet (1950) – Doctor
- Pool of London (1951) – Sgt. – River Police (uncredited)
- The Browning Version (1951) – School Doorman (uncredited)
- Captain Horatio Hornblower (1951) – Seaman (uncredited)
- Calling Bulldog Drummond (1951) – Ex-service Men Collector (uncredited)
- The Man in the White Suit (1951) – Davidson
- Lady Godiva Rides Again (1951) – Cigar Smoker in Shop (uncredited)
- Green Grow the Rushes (1951) – Joseph Bainbridge (farmer)
- Outcast of the Islands (1951) – 2nd Englishman in Snooker Room (uncredited)
- Mr. Denning Drives North (1951) – Harry Stoper
- Death of an Angel (1952) – Walter Grannage
- Angels One Five (1952) – Airman
- Saturday Island (1952) – Dr. Snyder
- Castle in the Air (1952) – Moffat
- You're Only Young Twice (1952) – (uncredited)
- The Brave Don't Cry (1952) – Hughie Aitken
- Miss Robin Hood (1952) – Bunyan
- The Long Memory (1953) – Scotson (uncredited)
- Time Bomb (1953) – Ticket Collector (uncredited)
- Street Corner (1953) – Det. Constable Brown
- The Cruel Sea (1953) – A.R.P. Warden
- Grand National Night (1953) – Plainclothes Detective
- Turn the Key Softly (1953) – George Jenkins
- The Sword and the Rose (1953) – Sailor
- Rob Roy, the Highland Rogue (1953) – Hugh MacGregor
- Adventure in the Hopfields (1954) – Mr. Quin
- The Maggie (1954) – Hailing Officer
- The Sleeping Tiger (1954) – Manager of Pearce & Mann
- Sherlock Holmes – "Case of The Pennsylvania Gun" – Inspector MacLeod (1954)
- The Young Lovers (1954) – Counterman (uncredited)
- Third Party Risk (1954) – The Scientist
- Lease of Life (1954) – Mr. Russell
- Passing Stranger (1954) – (uncredited)
- Isn't Life Wonderful! (1954) – Green
- The Love Match (1955) – Mr. Postlewaite (uncredited)
- John and Julie (1955) – Garage Policeman
- Now and Forever (1956) – Sgt. Gibson (uncredited)
- Reach for the Sky (1956) – Pearson (uncredited)
- It's Great to Be Young (1956) – Mr. Scott, School Inspector
- The Man in the Sky (1957) – Sim
- Interpol (1957) – Company man
- Let's Be Happy (1957) – Hotel Reception Clerk
- The Key (1958) – Sparks
- A Night to Remember (1958) – Chief Clerk – Victualling Department (uncredited)
- Next to No Time (1958) – Clerk
- Left Right and Centre (1959) – Mr. Bray
- Yesterday's Enemy (1959) – Brigadier
- The Bridal Path (1959) – Bank Cashier
- Danger Tomorrow (1960) – Steve
- The Day They Robbed the Bank of England (1960) – Strand receptionist (uncredited)
- Man in the Moon (1960) – Woomera director
- Bomb in the High Street (1961) – Trent
- Flat Two (1962) – Clerk of the Court
- Play It Cool (1962) – Euston Porter #1 (uncredited)
- Reach for Glory (1962) – Mr. Freeman
- The War Lover (1962) – Pub Landlord (uncredited)
- The Amorous Prawn (1962) – McLeod (uncredited)
- The Flood (1963)
- I Could Go On Singing (1963) – Reynolds
- The Punch and Judy Man (1963) – Bobby Bachelor
- Heavens Above! (1963) – Bit Part, Cabinet Office (uncredited)
- 80,000 Suspects (1963) – Town Clerk of Bath (uncredited)
- Crooks in Cloisters (1964) – Ship's Chandler
- The Heroes of Telemark (1965) – Sr. Sandersen
- The Trygon Factor (1966) – Sgt. Chivers
- The Devil Rides Out (1968) – Malin
- Twisted Nerve (1968) – Hospital Attendant (uncredited)
- Kidnapped (1971) – Advocates Secretary
- The Wicker Man (1973) – Harbour Master
- Black Jack (1979) – Dr. Jones
