= Miss Robin Hood =

- Theatrical release poster
- Directed by: John Guillermin
- Screenplay by: Val Valentine; Patrick Campbell; Geoffrey Orme
- Story by: Reed de Rouen
- Produced by: Donald B. Wilson
- Starring: Margaret Rutherford; Richard Hearne; Michael Medwin; Peter Jones
- Cinematography: Arthur Grant
- Edited by: Manuel del Campo
- Music by: Temple Abady
- Production company: Group 3 Films
- Distributed by: Associated British Film Distributors
- Release date: November 1952
- Running time: 76 minutes
- Country: United Kingdom
- Language: English

Miss Robin Hood is a 1952 British second feature ('B') comedy film directed by John Guillermin and starring Margaret Rutherford and Richard Hearne. It was written by Val Valentine and Patrick Campbell from a story by Reed De Rouen.

== Plot ==
A writer named Henry Wrigley creates a comic strip character named Miss Robin Hood for a children's story paper. It is a modernized retelling of the Robin Hood legend in which the heroine robs banks with the assistance of a gang of teenage girls and then redistributes the money.

Unfortunately the cartoon is dropped from the paper, and Wrigley leaves his job. However, Miss Honey, who is director of a home for the orphans of London in Hampstead, recruits Wrigley to carry out a little light safebreaking, believing that he has such skills because he created Miss Robin Hood. Difficulties arise when Scotland Yard becomes involved.

== Cast ==
- Margaret Rutherford as Miss Honey
- Richard Hearne as Henry Wrigley
- Edward Lexy as Wilson
- Frances Rowe as Marion
- Michael Medwin as Ernest
- Eunice Gayson as Pam
- Sidney James as Sidney
- Dora Bryan as Pearl
- Eric Berry as Lord Otterbourne
- Russell Waters as Bunyan
- Peter Jones as Lidstone
- Reg Varney as Dennis
- Francis de Wolff as Accident Policeman
- James Robertson Justice as MacAlister
- Ian Carmichael as Office Junior (uncredited)

== Production ==
Filming began at Southall Studios in the last week of March 1952. The film features a variety of unusual camerawork, such as unexpected extreme close-ups and fast motion sequences. Disney was making The Story of Robin Hood at the time and its executives were reportedly unhappy that the Group 3 film could be confused with theirs.

== Critical reception ==
The Monthly Film Bulletin wrote: "This new production from Group 3 is a haphazard mixture of farce and fantasy. ... A few authentically comic moments, and an exuberant hit-or-miss approach, do something to sustain the film, but the humour ... too often seems merely juvenile. Margaret Rutherford, playing the strange Miss Honey with a Robin Hood outfit and a hockey captain vocabulary, makes the character almost excessively grotesque, and the mild Richard Hearne might be happier in a more conventional type of comedy. Lack of discipline in both script and direction is, however, responsible for most of the shortcomings of this slapdash and undergraduatish piece."

Kine Weekly wrote: "There are a few bright satirical touches, but most of its fun is fourth form. ... The picture, which gives Margaret Rutherford her head, tries desperately hard to be both clever and funny, but few of its arrows hit their targets. Richard Hearne, who, by the way, deserves a more rational vehicle, introduces a pleasing touch of whimsy, but, like most other members of the cast, is soon swept off his feet by the script. It is more wild than witty."

Bosley Crowther of The New York Times wrote, "Even with stalwart Margaret Rutherford playing the principal role – that of a good-natured looney – in this utterly slap-happy film, and even with several cheering flashes of tomfoolery to light the way, the whole thing is just a bit too labored – too fatuous – to be continuous fun."

The Radio Times Guide to Films gave the film 2/5 stars, writing: "This disappointing comedy gave the much loved Margaret Rutherford a rare chance to star. Considering the infectious enthusiasm of her performance as the mischievous Miss Honey, she deserved better material than slight skirmish with a gang of crooks over a valuable whisky recipe. There are solid turns from Sid James and James Robertson-Justice, but writers Val Valentine and Patrick Campbell have over diluted the mixture for most tastes."

Leslie Halliwell said: "Disappointing star comedy with no build-up."

In British Sound Films: The Studio Years 1928–1959 David Quinlan rated the film as "mediocre", writing: "Would-be Ealing-style comedy is too silly for words."

Graeme Clark of the website The Spinning Image wrote, "It's all very fluffy and inconsequential, but with Patrick Campbell contributing to the script and this array of talent in front of the camera, vintage Brit comedy fans are well catered for."

FilmInk said "It has a decent enough central idea ... but it doesn't have enough faith in the idea, so all this other extraneous stuff is added."
