= The Eight Lancashire Lads =

The Eight Lancashire Lads was a troupe of young male clog dancers who toured the music halls of Great Britain and Ireland in the late 19th and early 20th centuries.

== Founders ==
They were founded by Bill Cawley and J.W. (William) Jackson (1863–1940) of Wigan, Lancashire. As they became more successful, they recruited other members such as Charlie Chaplin, who got his first professional break with them at the age of eleven.

== Former members ==
- Charlie Chaplin
- Nat Jackley
- Brothers Richard, Eric and Clem White went to Sydney, Australia in the 1910s and formed theatre companies including Edgley and Dawe. They had changed their names from White and the Australian theatrical empressarion Michael Edgley is descended from Eric Edgley. His brother, Richard White, was for a period the choreographer of the women's chorus at the Tivoli revue theatre in Sydney.
- Percy Joshua Norman (Pip) was in the troupe c. 1921.
- Gabriel Winestein was another of the lads. Born in Leeds, Gabriel joined the troupe in about 1905.
- Percy Frederick Kenyon Connor (later Percy Frederick Smith) was in the group and was a friend of Charlie Chaplin's in London. Percy went on to become a professional dancer who danced all over Europe with his wife Edith Elsie Smith (née Roy). Percy's brother-in-law was Ernest G Roy, the film producer. When Edith died in about 1925, Percy disappeared and no further information about him is known.
- Gordon Stretton

The dancer Josie Woods trained with the group in the 1920s.

== Records ==
All of the Eight Lancashire Lads performances which featured Charlie Chaplin are listed in A. J. Marriot's book Chaplin: stage by stage (2005).
