= Josie Woods =

British dancer and activist (1912–2008)

- Born: Josephine Lucy Wood; 16 May 1912; Canning Town, London, England, UK
- Died: 28 June 2008 (aged 96); California, U.S.
- Occupations: Dancer, choreographer

Josie Woods (16 May 1912 – 28 June 2008) was a Black British dancer, choreographer and activist.

== Early life ==
Woods was born Josephine Lucy Wood in Canning Town, London, in 1912. Her father, Charles Wood, was from Dominica, and her mother, Emily, had Gypsy ancestry. As a teenager, Woods worked as a seamstress. In 1927, Belle Davis held auditions for a dance troupe in the East End of London, and selected Woods and her brother, Charles or Charlie. They trained with a clog dancing group, The Eight Lancashire Lads.

Davis created a group called the Magnolia Blossoms with several girls, including Woods.

== Career ==
The Magnolia Blossoms worked in Paris with Louis Douglas, and became part of his show Black People. Woods appeared in La Revue nègre, replacing Josephine Baker.

Woods worked in France for two years before returning to Britain in 1932 as part of the group Eight Black Streaks. The group toured music halls and were successful, being described as "the first established dance troupe of black Britons". They appeared in the film Kentucky Minstrels (1934).

Woods also toured with Cyril Lagey and Ken "Snakehips" Johnson. During the Second World War, she worked with Eddie Williams.

Woods taught dance. She was one of the first people to introduce the jitterbug to Britain. After the Second World War, she set up an act with one of her students, Willie Payne, and they appeared in clubs as Ken Ross and Lucille. They were guest stars in the film The Nitwits on Parade (1949). Later she worked with Cab Kaye as an act called Two Brown Birds of Rhythm.

== Activism ==
Woods was a community activist in Brixton, and taught people about Black British history.

When working as an extra on the film Old Mother Riley's Jungle Treasure (1951), she organised a strike over pay.

== Legacy ==
In 1997, a television documentary was made about Woods by the BBC, for the programme Black Britain.

Woods is part of the Black History Tube Map set up by the Black Cultural Archives and Transport for London.

Her biography was included in the Knowing Newham Hero Hunt, a children's theatre production developed for Newham Heritage Month in 2021.

== Personal life ==
Woods was married in the 1930s; her husband was abusive. In 1956 she had a son with an American soldier who was stationed in the UK. Her son, Ralph Moore, became a saxophonist in America. Woods moved to California in 2001. She died in 2008 aged 96.
