= London Belongs to Me =

- Original theatrical poster
- Directed by: Sidney Gilliat
- Written by: Sidney Gilliat; J. B. Williams
- Based on: London Belongs to Me by Norman Collins
- Produced by: Sidney Gilliat; Frank Launder; J. Arthur Rank (Executive Producer)
- Starring: Richard Attenborough; Alastair Sim; Wylie Watson; Joyce Carey; Fay Compton; Stephen Murray; Susan Shaw
- Cinematography: Wilkie Cooper
- Edited by: Thelma Myers
- Music by: Benjamin Frankel
- Production company: Individual Pictures
- Distributed by: General Film Distributors
- Release dates: 12 August 1948 (London); 13 August 1948 (United Kingdom)
- Running time: 112 mins
- Country: United Kingdom
- Language: English
- Budget: £271,300
- Box office: £113,100

London Belongs to Me (also known as Dulcimer Street) is a British film released in 1948, directed by Sidney Gilliat, and starring Richard Attenborough and Alastair Sim. It was written by Gilliat and J.B. Williams, based on the 1945 novel London Belongs to Me by Norman Collins, which was also the basis for a seven-part 1977 series made by Thames Television.

== Plot ==
The film concerns the residents of a large terraced house in London between Christmas 1938 and September 1939. Among them are the landlady, Mrs Vizzard, who is a widow and a believer in spiritualism; Mr and Mrs Josser, and their teenage daughter Doris; the eccentric spiritualist medium Mr Squales; the colourful Connie Coke, the young motor mechanic Percy Boon and his mother.

Percy is in love with the Jossers' daughter and turns to crime to raise money to impress her with, but he bungles a car theft and finds himself accused of murder. Mr Josser digs into his retirement fund to hire the boy a lawyer. Mr Squales testifies against Percy, but in the process exposes to his fiancée Mrs Vizzard the falsity of his claims to be able to contact the dead and to predict the future.

Percy is found guilty, but his neighbours rally to his defence. With the assistance of Mr Josser's staunchly socialist Uncle Henry, they gather thousands of signatures on a petition to win him a reprieve. At the end of the film, Percy's supporters march through the rain to the Houses of Parliament, only to discover just before their arrival that clemency has already been granted.

== Cast ==
- Richard Attenborough as Percy Boon
- Alastair Sim as Mr Squales
- Fay Compton as Mrs Josser
- Stephen Murray as Uncle Henry Knockell
- Wylie Watson as Mr Josser
- Susan Shaw as Doris Josser
- Joyce Carey as Mrs Kitty Vizzard
- Ivy St. Helier as Connie Coke
- Andrew Crawford as Bill
- Hugh Griffith as Headlam Fynne
- Eleanor Summerfield as Myrna Watson
- Gladys Henson as Mrs Boon
- Maurice Denham as Jack Rufus
- Ivor Barnard as Mr Justice Plymme
- Cecil Trouncer as Mr Henry Wassall
- Arthur Howard as Mr Chinkwell
- John Salew as Mr Barks
- Cyril Chamberlain as Detective Sergeant Wilson
- Aubrey Dexter as Mr Battlebury
- Jack McNaughton as Jimmy
- Henry Charles Hewitt as Verriter
- Fabia Drake as Mrs Jan Byl
- Sydney Tafler as nightclub receptionist
- Henry Edwards as Police Superintendent
- George Cross as Inspector Cartwright
- Edward Evans as Detective Sergeant Taylor
- Russell Waters as Clerk of the Court
- Kenneth Downey as Mr Veezey Blaize, KC
- Basil Cunard as Foreman of the Jury
- Wensley Pithey as first warden
- Manville Tarrant as second warden
- Leo Genn as narrator

== Production ==
Filming started 6 November. The film was shot at Pinewood Studios. The main street was an interior set, but additional location filming took place around London, and at Burnham Beeches in Buckinghamshire.

Sidney Gilliat says Earl St John asked if Gilliat could use one of Rank's contract stars like Pat Roc, Margaret Lockwood or Jean Kent; Gilliat chose Roc as he had worked well with her on Millions Like Us. "And she was all wrong and I had to throw her out, so it cost a lot of money and a lot of pain," said Gilliat.

Patricia Roc claimed she pulled out because she did not want to keep playing Cockney roles. She was replaced by Susan Shaw.

The film includes the first screen appearance of Arthur Lowe, who makes a brief and uncredited appearance as a commuter on a train.

== Reception ==
=== Box office ===
Trade papers called the film a "notable box office attraction" in British cinemas in 1948. Producer's receipts were £93,400 in the UK and £19,700 overseas. According to Rank's own records the film had made a loss of £168,200 for the company by December 1949.

=== Critical ===
The Monthly Film Bulletin wrote, "Norman Collins' story, which is Dickensian in the richness of its pathos and kindly humour, has been triumphantly captured on the screen."

Kine Weekly wrote: "The principal characters are exceedingly well drawn, atmosphere and detail are excellent, and the dialogue is smooth, while its sharp sense of humour is heightened by its slightly cynical approach."

Variety wrote: "Starting out as tense melo, it develops into broad farce, and many people may rightly resent being expected to laugh while a fight is being made for the life of a youth sentenced to death. ... Lack of consistency in the treatment unfortunately brings the film down to an average level. With its excellent characterizations, it s meaty story and fine London backgrounds it should have been a first-rate thriller. But it isn't. An exceptionally big cast handles the characterizations with skill, but top honors go to Richard Attenborough, living the part of the flashy youngster who wants to go places the easy way, and Alastair Sim, who just can't miss as the fake medium.."

== Television series ==
The novel was also adapted for Thames Television as a series, broadcast in seven one-hour episodes from 6 September to 18 October 1977. The cast included Derek Farr as Mr Josser, Madge Ryan as Mrs Vizzard and Patricia Hayes as Connie Coke.
