= Derek Twist =

British screenwriter, film editor and director (1905–1979)

- Born: Derek Norman Twist; 26 May 1905; London, England
- Died: 15 August 1979 (aged 74); Chelmsford, Essex, England
- Other name: Derek N. Twist
- Occupations: Film director, Film editor, Screenwriter

Derek Norman Twist (26 May 1905 – 15 August 1979) was a British screenwriter, film editor and director. He was sometimes credited as Derek N. Twist. During the 1930s he worked at British Gaumont.

== Early life ==
Twist was born in Paddington area of London on 26 May 1905 to Cecil and Catherine Twist; his father was a solicitor.

He was married to actress and stage director Vida Hope until her death in a road accident in December 1963.

== Selected filmography ==
=== Editor ===
- Sunshine Susie (1931)
- After the Ball (1932)
- Waltz Time (1933)
- The Fire Raisers (1934)
- Princess Charming (1934)
- Orders Is Orders (1934)
- Chu Chin Chow (1934)
- Aunt Sally (1934)
- The 39 Steps (1935)
- The Phantom Light (1935)
- The Passing of the Third Floor Back (1935)
- Rhodes of Africa (1936)
- The Edge of the World (1937)
- Kicking the Moon Around (1938)
- The Lion Has Wings (1939)

=== Writer ===
- They Drive by Night (1938)
- Murder Will Out (1940)
- Confidential Lady (1940)
- Dr. O'Dowd (1940)
- Old Bill and Son (1941)
- The End of the River (1947)
- All Over the Town (1949)
- Green Grow the Rushes (1951)
- Angels One Five (1952)
- Police Dog (1955)
- "Douglas Fairbanks Jr., Presents" (1955)
- Overseas Press Club – Exclusive! (1957)
- Rx for Murder (1958)
- "International Detective" (1960)

=== Director ===
- The End of the River (1947)
- All Over the Town (1949)
- Green Grow the Rushes (1951)
- Police Dog (1955)
- "Douglas Fairbanks Jr., Presents" (1954–1957)
- Rx Murder (1958)

=== Producer ===
- Angels One Five (1952)

=== Production Manager ===
- Calamity the Cow (1967)

=== Actor ===
- Journey Together (1945) .... Wing Commander on Aircrew Interview Board
- Rx Murder (1958)

== Bibliography ==
- Chibnall, Steve & McFarlane, Brian. The British B' Film. Palgrave MacMillan, 2009.
