= Knockshinnoch disaster =

1950 mining accident in Ayrshire, Scotland

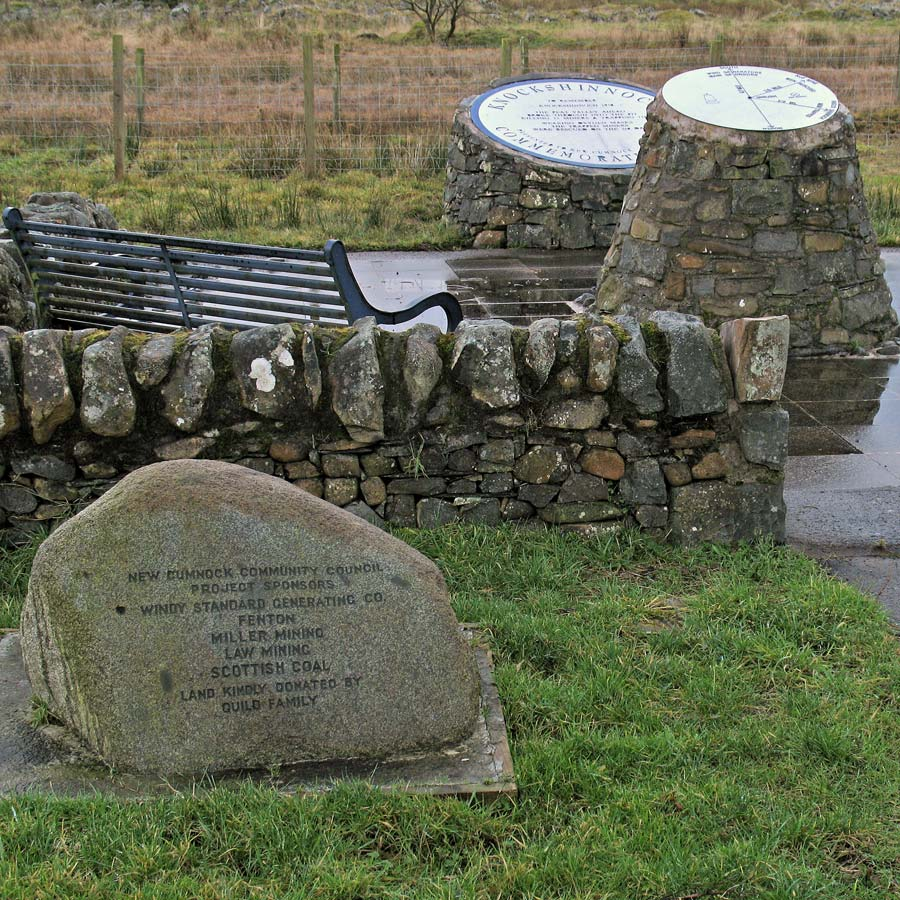
- Memorials to the miners who died in the Knockshinnoch disaster.
- Date: 7 September 1950
- Time: 7.30pm
- Location: New Cumnock, Ayrshire, Scotland; 55°23′14″N 4°11′56″W
- Participants: 129 miners
- Outcome: 116 rescued
- Deaths: 13
- Verdict: flooding caused by peat bog

The Knockshinnoch disaster was a mining accident that occurred in September 1950 in the village of New Cumnock, Ayrshire, Scotland. Liquid peat and moss flooded pit workings, trapping more than a hundred miners underground. For several days rescue teams worked non-stop to reach the trapped men. Most were eventually rescued three days later, but 13 died. The disaster was an international media event. As of 2025, there are two remaining survivors of the incident.

== Background ==
Knockshinnoch Castle Colliery, which was situated at New Cumnock, was managed by the National Coal Board. Its shaft was sunk in 1942 on the site of an older pit that had been abandoned almost 60 years earlier. The pit brought prosperity back to a local mining community that had been in decline. The new pit attracted many miners from Lanarkshire.

The pit's owners employed a policy of advanced mechanisation making the ‘Castle’ one of the best equipped and most productive collieries in the Ayrshire coalfield. At the time of the disaster, Knockshinnoch employed approximately 700 men. Coal production was in the region of 4,500–5,000 long tons (4,600–5,100 t; 5,000–5,600 short tons) per week. It was mostly extracted from two seams known locally as the ‘Main Coal’ and the ‘Turf Coal’.

In 1947 the mine was taken over by National Coal Board (NCB), Scottish Division. The NCB continued to invest in modern mechanised techniques at the pit. The colliery also boasted a great welfare programme for its employees including a new canteen and pithead baths (which had opened during the first week of September 1950).

== Collapse ==
On Thursday, 7 September 1950 at approximately 7.30 pm – during the afternoon shift – a large volume of liquefied peat or moss broke down into the No. 5 Heading section of the 'Main coal' seam in the South Boig district of the mine. The liquid matter had come from just below the surface. The inrush occurred at the point where the No. 5 Heading (or Drift) was being driven towards the surface at a gradient of 1 in 2. The inrush of liquid rushed back down the incline filling miles of underground workings and sealing off all escape routes to the surface.

One hundred and thirty-five men were underground at the time. Six working close to the pit bottom managed to escape before they were sealed in by the sludge. Another 116 miners found themselves cut-off from the pit bottom. However, a further 13 men were unaccounted for.

As the men remained trapped underground, rescue teams began to try and reach them before they were engulfed by the encroaching sludge or they were overcome by the rapidly deteriorating air quality and gas. A telephone line to the surface remained intact, allowing the trapped miners to provide details of their location to their rescuers. British Pathe News described this as "a truly remarkable story of how ordinary men worked tirelessly in a race against time and the forces of nature to achieve one of the most dramatic and remarkable rescues ever attempted."

After three days, the men were eventually rescued by being led through the old disused gas-filled Bank No. 6 mine workings which ran close to Knockshinnoch. A total of 87 sets of Siebe Gorman Salvus oxygen rebreathers (mainly from fire stations) were used to get the men out.

The 13 men trapped close to No. 5 Heading could not be reached. Their bodies were recovered months later.

== Legacy ==
In 1952, the film The Brave Don't Cry was made about the disaster.
