= The Nitwits on Parade =

1949 British musical variety film by Robert Jordan Hill

- Directed by: Robert Jordan Hill
- Starring: Max Bygraves; Sid Millward and his Nitwits
- Edited by: Robert Jordan Hill
- Production company: Advance Films
- Distributed by: Adelphi Films
- Release date: 18 July 1949
- Running time: 45 minutes
- Country: United Kingdom
- Language: English

The Nitwits on Parade (also known as Ignorance is Bliss) is a 1949 British second feature ('B') black-and-white musical variety film directed by Robert Jordan Hill and starring Max Bygraves, Sid Millward and His Nitwits and a cast of variety entertainers.

Sid Millward and His Nitwits were the house band on the BBC radio show Ignorance Is Bliss (1946–1950).

== Synopsis ==
The film comprises a series of musical and variety acts at the Club Zanzibar, compered by Max Bygraves.

== Cast (alphabetical) ==
- Max Bygraves as compere
- Norah Black
- Hope and Penny Calvert
- Billy Christmas
- Ronnie Genarder
- Josephine and Payne
- Dickie Martin
- The Men About Town
- Sid Millward and His Nitwits
- Norah Moody
- William Payne
- Rex Ramer
- Monty Warlock
- Freddie Willetts
- Josie Woods

== Production ==
The film was shot at Bushey Studios.

== Reception ==
The Monthly Film Bulletin wrote: "The film is simply a floor show at the Cabaret Zanzibar compéred by Max Bygraves and featuring Josephine and Payne, coloured dancers; "Men About Town", a vocal trio; Norah Moody in imitations of Jimmy Durante, Professor Joad, Charles Boyer and others; dancers Hope and Penny Calvert and Dickie Martin; and Rex Ramer and his novelty act. The Nitwits Band, well known from Ignorance is Bliss on the radio, are an important item on the programme. The general level of performance is a low one by cabaret standards, and the effect as a film seems little better."

Kine Weekly wrote: "Pithy and compact screen cabaret, appropriately staged in a typical night spot. "The Nitwits," crazy but clever band of Ignorance is Bliss, the big BBC attraction, provide lively accompaniment, Max Bygraves is the compere and Rex Ramer, a brilliant mimic, heads a team of well-varied turns. There is no story, and none is necessary. Incidentally, one of its biggest jokes is the 'A' certificate. The Censor must have completely lost his sense of humour."

== Home media ==
A 24-minute edited version of the film was released on the 2021 Renown Pictures compilation DVD Stars in Your Eyes.
