= Vida Hope =

British actress (1910–1963)

Vida Hope in Lease of Life (1954)

Vida Hope (16 December 1910 – 23 December 1963) was a British stage and film actress, who also directed stage productions.

== Life and career ==
Born in Liverpool, Lancashire, to theatrical parents, Hope travelled widely as a child. She was "forbidden to go on the stage", so at age 16, she became a typist in an advertising office, going on to write copy. She took every opportunity to take part in amateur dramatics, managing to get lead roles in plays by Shaw, Ibsen, and Chekhov.

Following the role of the Fairy Wish-Fulfilment in the pantomime The Babes in the Wood at the Unity Theatre, London, she was, in 1939, offered a role by Herbert Farjeon in The Little Revue and worked in his revues for more than three years. In 1940, she supported and formed a strong friendship with Dirk Bogarde, in his first West End play, Diversions. During the Second World War, she became a regular singer at the Players' Theatre, where her repertoire included "Casey Jones", "Daddy Wouldn't Buy Me a Bow-wow", "Dashing Away with the Smoothing Iron", "The Lady Wasn't Going that Way" and "You May Pet Me as Much as You Please". In 1942 she appeared alongside Geoffrey Dunn in a melodrama, The Streets of London.

Hope played a prominent role alongside Alec Guinness in the Academy Award-nominated film The Man in the White Suit as Bertha, in 1951. She appeared in a range of roles in a production of Peer Gynt at the New Theatre in London (1944–45), she directed the 1953 London production of The Boy Friend (and is also credited as director on the 'original cast' recording of 1954 starring Julie Andrews) and directed Valmouth at the Lyric, Hammersmith (1958) and a revival of The Boy Friend at the Bristol Hippodrome (1958–59).

Hope was married to the film editor and director Derek Twist, and appeared in several of his films. She died in a road accident, on 23 December 1963, in Chelmsford, Essex, aged 53.

== Partial filmography ==
- The 39 Steps (1935) - Usherette
- Champagne Charlie (1944) – Rosie
- English Without Tears (1944)
- Nicholas Nickleby (1947) – Fanny Squeers
- Hue and Cry (1947) – Mrs. Kirby
- The Mark of Cain (1947) – Jennie
- They Made Me a Fugitive (1947) – Mrs Fenshaw
- It Always Rains on Sunday (1947) – Mrs Wallis
- Woman Hater (1948)
- For Them That Trespass (1949) – Olive Mockson
- Paper Orchid (1949) – Jonquil Jones
- The Interrupted Journey (1949) – Miss Marchmont
- Double Confession (1950) – Madam Zilia
- The Woman in Question (1950) – Shirley Jones
- The Man in the White Suit (1951) – Bertha
- Cheer the Brave (1951)
- Green Grow the Rushes (1951) – Polly Bainbridge
- Angels One Five (1952) – W.A.A.F.
- Emergency Call (1952) – Brenda
- The Long Memory (1952) – Alice Gedge
- Women of Twilight (1952) – Jess Smithson
- The Broken Horseshoe (1953) – Jackie Leroy
- Marilyn (1953) - Rosie
- Fast and Loose (1954) – Gladys
- Lease of Life (1954) - Mrs. Sproatley
- Charley Moon (1955) – staging of the musical numbers
- Rx Murder (1958) - Louise
- In the Doghouse (1961) – Mrs Crabtree
