= Sid Millward =

British musician (1909–1972)

- Born: Sidney Millward; 9 December 1909; London, England
- Died: 22 February 1972 (aged 62); Carolina, Puerto Rico
- Occupations: Musician, comedian, bandleader
- Years active: 1930s–1972
- Known for: Sid Millward and His Nitwits

Sidney Millward (9 December 1909 – 22 February 1972) was a British musician who led the comedy band Sid Millward and His Nitwits, performing burlesques of classical music from the 1930s until the 1970s.

== Biography ==
Millward was born in London, and raised in the East End. He left school in his teens but studied woodwind at the Royal College of Music. By the mid-1930s he was known as a leading saxophone and clarinet player in swing bands, including the Jack Hylton Orchestra.

He formed his own band in 1937, naming them the Nitwits the following year. They made regular appearances on BBC radio, and became the resident band at the Café Anglais in Leicester Square. In the Second World War they performed as part of Stars in Battledress in ENSA.

After the war, they were the house band on the BBC radio show Ignorance Is Bliss, and featured in the 1949 film The Nitwits on Parade. In 1950 they had their own radio show, Nitwit Serenade, and later in the decade were frequent performers on British television variety shows. Beside Millward, band members included Wally Stewart, Cyril Lagey, Charlie Rossi, Arthur Calkin, Sid Flood, Harry Coles, Ronnie Genarda and Tony Traverci. They played "wild versions of classical hits, interspersed with madcap, visual jokes", and were an influence on the Bonzo Dog Doo Dah Band. Comedian Roy Hudd described them as "an idiot conductor in an ill-fitting tail suit with mad hair and a Hitler moustache... [with] a bunch of idiot-looking senile delinquents...".

By 1960, as theatre work dried up in Britain, the band started working regularly at Le Lido nightclub in Paris, and moved to the Stardust Resort and Casino in Las Vegas, run by Moe Dalitz, in 1962. They returned to Britain in 1967, before a short stint working in Teheran just before the Six Days War. The band then returned to Las Vegas. Following several heart attacks, Millward gave up playing the clarinet, and instead "wandered around the stage in tails and spats, waving a baton around rather pointlessly."

Millward died in 1972, from another heart attack, in a hotel in Carolina, Puerto Rico, during a season performing there. He was buried in Puerto Rico after his widow refused to pay for his body to be repatriated.

After Millward's death, some of the band members continued on into the 1990s as The Nuts & Bolts, often playing on BBC4, the UK vaudeville circuit, and some European and US circuses.
