= Green Grow the Rushes (film) =

- Directed by: Derek N. Twist
- Written by: Derek N. Twist; Howard Clewes
- Based on: Green Grow the Rushes by Howard Clewes
- Produced by: John W. Gossage
- Starring: Roger Livesey; Richard Burton; Honor Blackman
- Cinematography: Harry Waxman
- Edited by: Hazel Wilkinson
- Music by: Lambert Williamson
- Production company: ACT Films
- Distributed by: British Lion Films
- Release date: 6 November 1951
- Running time: 77 minutes
- Country: United Kingdom
- Language: English
- Budget: $250,000

Green Grow the Rushes (re-released in 1954 as Brandy Ashore) is a 1951 British comedy film directed by Derek N. Twist and starring Roger Livesey, Richard Burton and Honor Blackman. It was written by Twist and Howard Clewes adapted from the 1949 novel of the same title by Clewes. The film was produced by John Gossage and funded by the National Film Finance Corporation and the Co-Operative Wholesale Society Bank.

== Plot ==
Three British government bureaucrats arrive in Kent to inquire as to why the coastal Anderida marsh is not being cultivated. The reason is that most of the local people know about or are involved in the liquor smuggling scheme operated by Captain Biddle and his accomplice Robert, who is posing as a fisherman when he is seen by the newspaper editor and his journalist daughter Meg.

Robert persuades them not to report it in the newspaper, and tells Biddle about his encounter with them. Biddle does not like the idea of any local "Lily White" (woman) knowing about their illegal activity; he was once married to a Lily White. The smugglers’ next cargo gets caught in a violent storm, and their boat washes inland, settling in the meadow of a farmer whose wife Polly happens to be Biddle's ex-wife.

== Cast ==
- Richard Burton as Robert Hammond
- Honor Blackman as Meg Cuffley
- Roger Livesey as Captain Cedric Biddle
- Frederick Leister as Colonel Gill
- Arnold Ridley as Tom Cuffley
- John Salew as Herbert Finch
- Colin Gordon as Roderick Fisherwish
- Geoffrey Keen as Spencer Prudhow
- Russell Waters as Joseph Bainbridge
- Vida Hope as Polly
- Cyril Smith as Constable Hewitt
- Jack McNaughton as Sgt. Edgar Rigby
- Eliot Makeham as James Urquhart, coast guard
- Gilbert Davis as Whitley
- Harcourt Williams as Chairman of the Bench
- Archie Duncan as Constable Pettigrew
- Bryan Forbes as Fred Starling, Biddle's crewman
- Harold Goodwin as Gosling, Biddle's crewman
- Henrik Jacobsen as Sigismund, Biddle's crewman

== Production ==
The film was made at Elstree Studios near London with sets the designed by the art director Frederick Pusey. Location shooting took place on the coastal Romney Marsh around the town of New Romney. It was the first film to be released by ACT Films, an entity formed by a trade union for filmmakers.

== Release ==
The film recouped its cost and a cut version of the film was re-released in 1954. However the NFFC rejected ACT's next two proposed projects, films about Sir Warren Hastings (The Governor's Lady) and the Tolpuddle Martyrs (Six Men of Dorset). So the company made less politically active films from then on.

== Reception ==
The Monthly Film Bulletin wrote: "The dividing line between the "gay, light touch" and "heavy-handed quasi-slapstick" is a delicate one, and the subtlety of the balance only becomes apparent when a film such as this makes its appearance. At times the cast seem more successful than the director; Roger Livesey, for example, gives an amusing performance as Captain Biddle, and Harcourt Williams as the Chairman of the Bench provides welcome relief from the dreary gambollings of the three Ministry officials. The smuggling seems so directly related to Whisky Galore that comparisons are inevitable, and once again this film proves unexceptional."

Kine Weekly wrote: "The picture has a good cast and is agreeably staged, but is bereft of new ideas. It attempts to parody life in a typical English Village, but its parochial jibes. to say nothing of those aimed at pompous Government officials, lack originality and sharpness. ... Produced by the ACT, it could have been partly redeemed by expert cutting, but the editing, like the script, is untidy."

Variety wrote: "In earlier stages, story suffers from inferior continuity, but in the second half, the plot runs smoothly. The author, Howard Clewes, has collaborated with director Derek Twist in adapting the original novel, but too many traces of its original book form are left behind. Acting reaches pleasing standard. Roger Livesey turns in a neat performance as the captain of the iquor-running vessel. Honor Blackman as a sob-sister on a local paper and Richard Burton as one of the smugglers provide an adequate romantic interest. Frederick Leister is nicely cast as one of the local bigwigs behind the smuggling. John Salew, Colin Gordon and Geoffrey Keen too obviously caricature the civil servants on a government investigation. Lesser roles are suitably handled."
