= Wee Georgie Wood =

British actor and comedian (1895–1979)

Wee Georgie Wood OBE
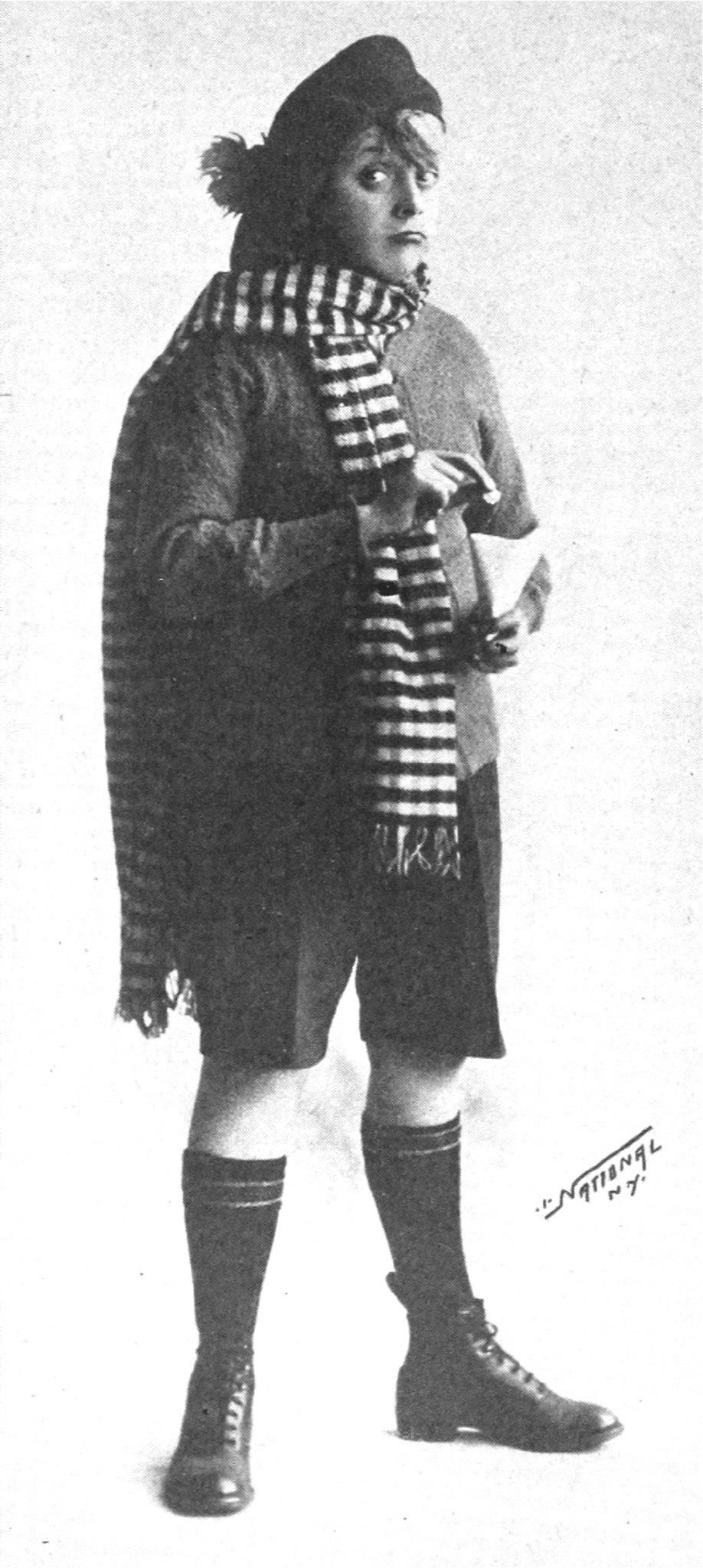
- Wood in 1924
- Born: George Wood Bamlett; 17 December 1895; Jarrow, County Durham, England
- Died: 19 February 1979 (aged 83); Bloomsbury, London, England
- Occupations: Comic entertainer, actor
- Years active: 1900–1953
- Spouse: Ewing Eaton (m. 1932; div. 1936)

George Wood Bamlett OBE (17 December 1895 – 19 February 1979), known professionally as Wee Georgie Wood, was a British comic entertainer and actor who appeared in films, plays and music hall revues. He had a lengthy career of over fifty years, based on exploiting the childlike appearance that he retained in adulthood.

== Biography ==
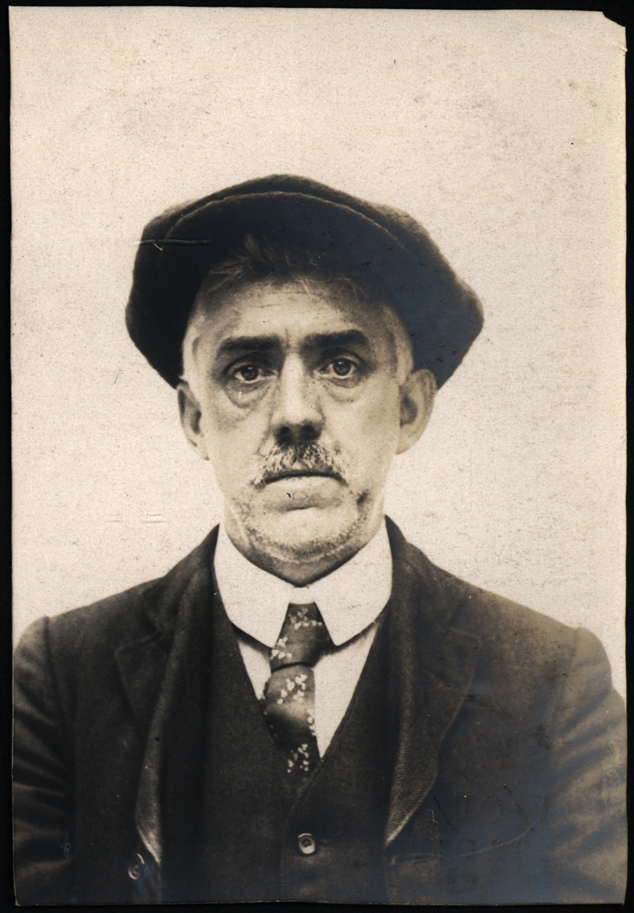
Wee Georgie's father, George Bamlett

He was born in Jarrow, County Durham, but within a few weeks of his birth moved to South Shields where his father owned a pawnbroker's shop. His parents were George Bamlett and Georgina, née Wood, who divorced in 1908 on account of his father's adultery. Georgie had a form of dwarfism, as an adult reaching a height of 4 ft 9 in (1.45 m), and retaining an unbroken voice.

From the age of five, he started performing in concert parties as an entertainer, and at the age of 13 was still able to perform in the guise of a five-year-old. For much of his career he was guided and managed by his mother, Georgina (née Wood), and by his teens he had become the family's main earner. He joined the Levy and Cardwell company touring around music halls, performed in pantomimes, and in 1908 made his first solo appearance onstage doing impressions of music hall stars Vesta Tilley and George Lashwood. In 1914, he was in a company that toured Australia. He was originally billed as 'the Boy Phenomenon', but he dropped the name after one theatre mistakenly advertised him as 'the Boy Euphonium'.

In 1917, he met fellow performer Dolly Harmer (born Sarah Elizabeth Caron, 1867–1956). She was the daughter of Pierre Caron, who performed as Peter Harmer, and had worked in music halls since the 1880s. She and Wood established a working relationship in which she played Wood's mother, continuing to perform in the role for over 35 years. Together they performed comedy sketches in which she would try to persuade him to behave properly. They toured together, worldwide, but usually performed in separate pantomimes during the winter months. They appeared in Royal Variety Performances in 1927 and 1931.

Wood has been termed "a brilliant raconteur... [and] a very funny comedian". However, according to music hall historian Roger Wilmut, Wood's material "is difficult to take today – such humour as there is is swamped by a treacly sentimentality...". He was considered to have been one of the most successful pantomime stars of his era and remained a popular performer through the 1920s and 1930s, though his style became increasingly outdated and it became more difficult for him to act the part of a child.

He married an American entertainer, Ewing Eaton, on 7 April 1933, though the marriage was brief and in later years Wood refused to speak of it. On another occasion, a girl's mother begged him to end a relationship, saying: "Let's face it Georgie, you're a midget." Wood never forgot the remark; reportedly he could never recount the story without bursting into tears, though with age and experience, "he learned to treat his shortness with a degree of humour".

He supported charitable causes and in 1936 was appointed chairman or 'King Rat' of the Grand Order of Water Rats. However, he wrote a book, Royalty, Religion and Rats!, which gave away some of the organisation's secrets, and as a result was expelled from it, only being readmitted in 1970.

During the Second World War, Wood toured widely with Harmer as part of ENSA, and regained some of his popularity. The pair are estimated to have played over 500 shows and travelled some 70,000 miles as entertainers during the war, and as a result Wood was awarded the OBE for services to the entertainment industry in King George VI's Birthday Honours List in 1946, shortly after his mother's death.

Wood and Harmer performed together until 1953, when they made a mutual decision to retire. Harmer died in 1956, aged 89. Wood remained active in show business circles, and was a member of the Savage Club. He also wrote a column in the weekly The Stage newspaper. According to writer Richard Anthony Baker, he was known as "an omnivorous reader with a prodigious memory, but he made sure people knew it...". Comedian Roy Hudd described him as a "fanatical" convert to Catholicism, "vociferous", "outspoken" and "self-opinionated".

Wood died at Gordon Mansions in Bloomsbury, London, on 19 February 1979, aged 83.

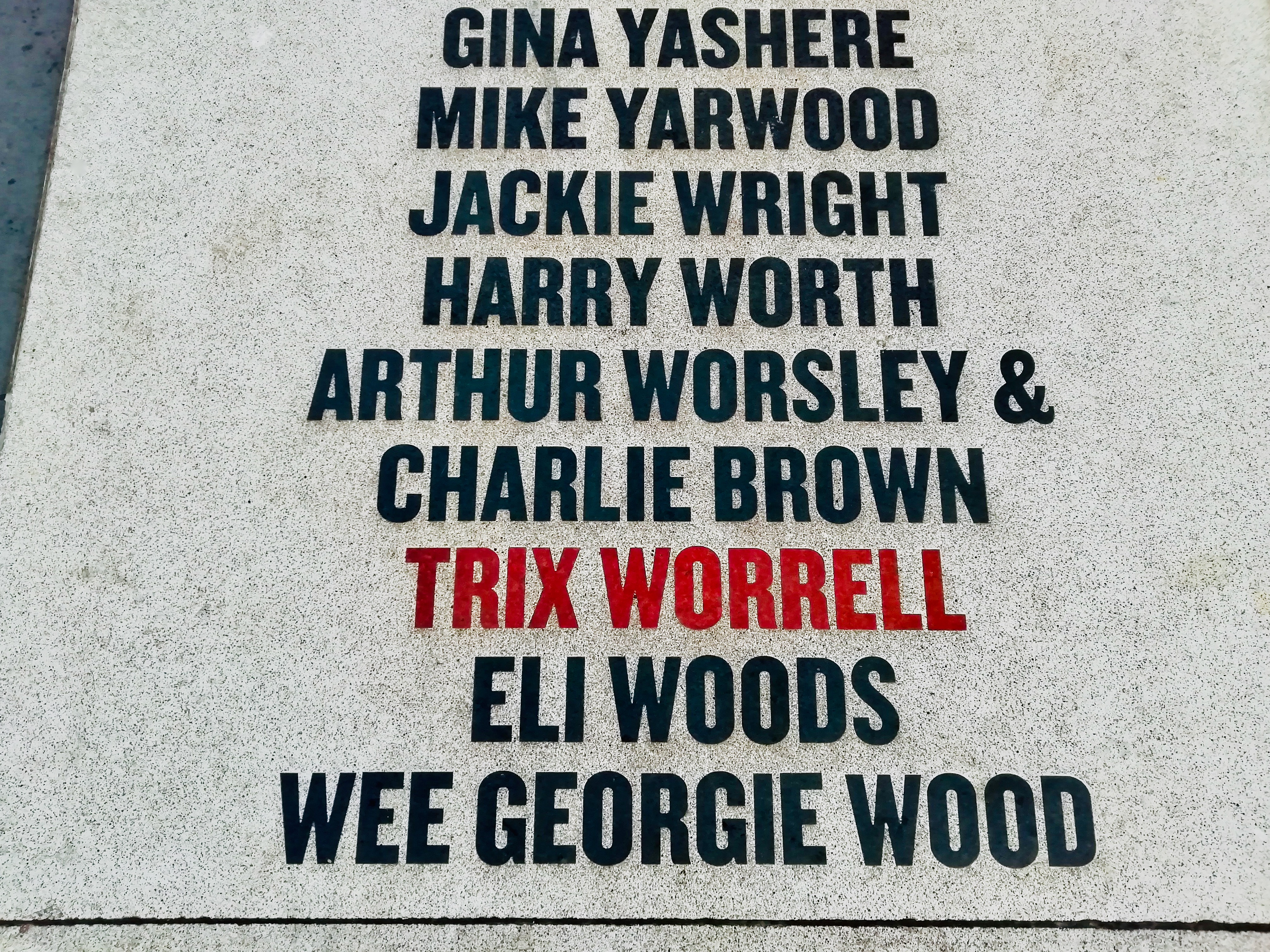
Wee Georgie Wood on Blackpool's Walk of Fame Comedy Carpet, 2022

== In popular culture ==
The Wee Georgie Wood Railway is a tramway in Tasmania named after him.

Wee Georgie Wood is mentioned at the end of the song "Dig It" from the Beatles' album Let It Be. He is also mentioned in the High & Dry episode "The Pier", in which Trevor suggests that they could hire Wee Georgie Wood at the pier theatre, and in the Last of the Summer Wine episode "A Short Blast of Fred Astaire" in which Pearl tells her husband Howard he's not "big enough to be Wee Georgie Wood!".

== Filmography ==
- Convict 99 (1919) - James, the office boy
- Two Little Drummer Boys (1928)
- The Black Hand Gang (1930)
- The Advantages of Paternity (1939), BBC Television
- This Is Music Hall (1955), co-writer with Hy Kraft, about the Grand Order of Water Rats, BBC Television
- Glencannon (1957) - Cookie, (filmed in England)
