= Emory Holloway =

American literary scholar-educator (1885–1977)

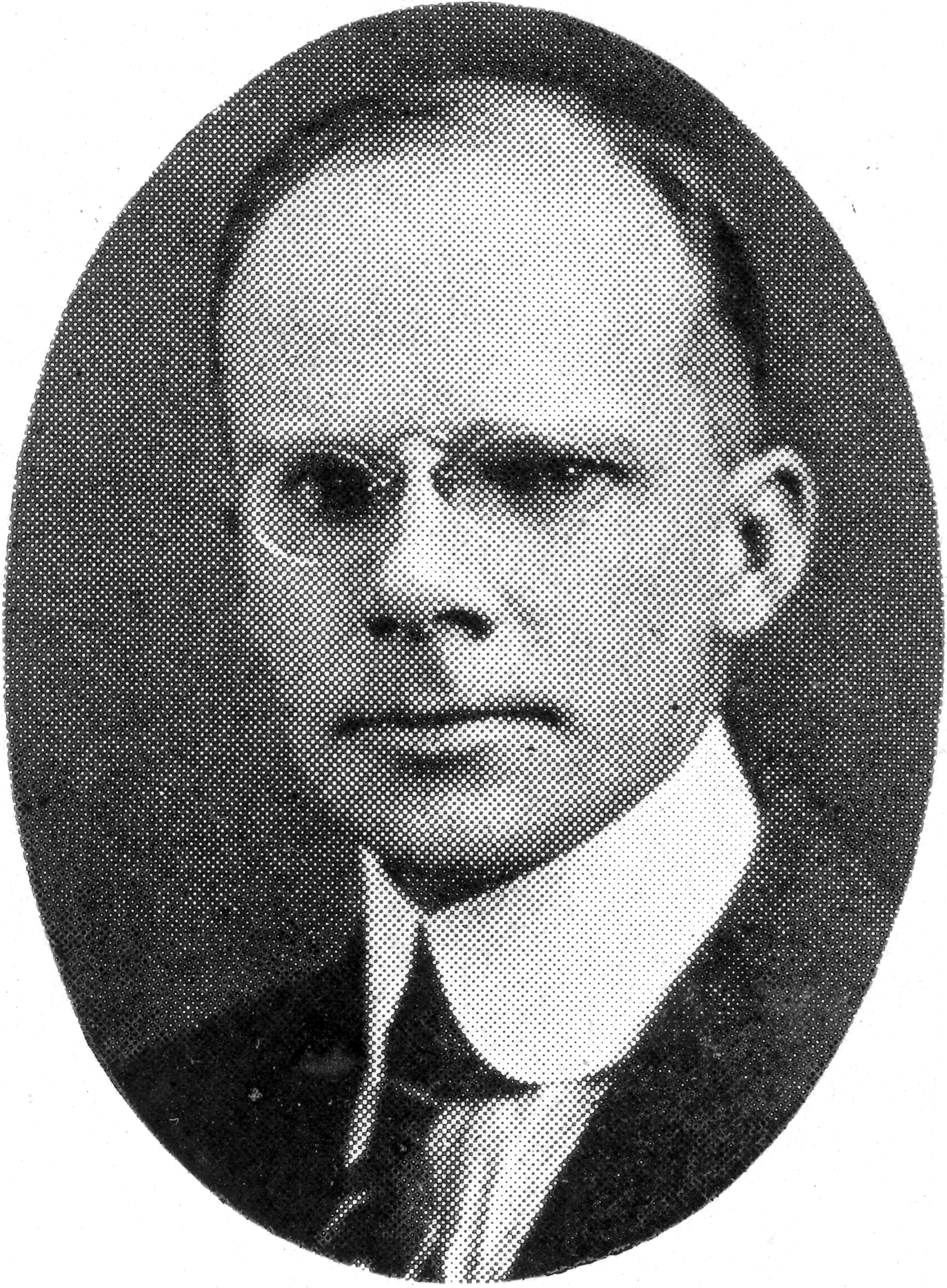
- Holloway in 1924
- Born: Rufus Emory Holloway; March 16, 1885; Marshall, Missouri, U.S.
- Died: July 30, 1977 (aged 92); Bethlehem, Pennsylvania, U.S.
- Occupations: Literary scholar, educator
- Employers: Adelphi University; Queens College
- Known for: Scholarship on Walt Whitman
- Awards: Pulitzer Prize for Biography or Autobiography (1927)

Academic background
- Education: Hendrix College (A.B., 1906); University of Texas (M.A., 1912); Columbia University (graduate study, 1913–1914)

Academic work
- Notable works: The Uncollected Poetry and Prose of Walt Whitman (1921); Whitman: An Interpretation in Narrative (1926); Free and Lonesome Heart: The Secret of Walt Whitman (1960)

Rufus Emory Holloway (March 16, 1885 in Marshall, Missouri – July 30, 1977 in Bethlehem, Pennsylvania) was an American literary scholar-educator most known for his studies of Walt Whitman. His Whitman: An Interpretation in Narrative (1926) was the first biography of a literary figure to win the Pulitzer Prize for Biography or Autobiography in 1927.

== Life ==
Holloway received his A.B. from Hendrix College in 1906 and his M.A. from the University of Texas in 1912, where he subsequently taught for a year. While completing further graduate study at Columbia University during the 1913-1914 academic year, his interest in Whitman was encouraged by John Erskine, causing him to author the Whitman essay for The Cambridge History of English and American Literature. Holloway became an instructor at Adelphi College in 1914 and was promoted to assistant professor in 1916. During World War I, he was a transportation secretary with the American Expeditionary Force in France and taught at the A.E.F. University in Beaune for one year. Returning to Adelphi, he became professor of English in 1919 and remained there until 1937, when he joined the original faculty of Queens College as a professor of American literature and chair of the English department; in 1954, he retired from teaching and became professor emeritus. He continued to live in Brooklyn, New York until moving in with his son in Coopersburg, Pennsylvania several months before his death.

The Uncollected Poetry and Prose of Walt Whitman (2 vols.) (1921), which took seven years established Holloway's reputation. His work resulted in a comprehensive body of resource materials and brought a much clearer understanding of Whitman's private thought and personal relationships, revealing his creative process.

Whitman: An Interpretation in Narrative (1926) pioneered the use of cinema-style narrative techniques in a biography, making it popular with the general public. In Whitman as a Subject for Biography (1974), Holloway says about it: "My aim was to present an interpretation through a method primarily narrative, yet relying heavily on Whitman's self-revelations."

Free and Lonesome Heart: The Secret of Walt Whitman (1960) is a reply to critics who had charged him with ignoring evidence of Whitman's sexual orientation and behavior, laying out the controversy surrounding Whitman's "simple homosexual" disposition in the context of the disputed interpretation of "Once I Passed Through a Populous City", developing an extensive apologetic on Whitman's use of paradox and on the necessity for a poet to embody both male and female natures: "The key word in the comprehension of Whitman is 'balance'."

Holloway's last biographical work, Portrait of a Poet: The Life of Walt Whitman, was considered too lengthy for publication; it was ultimately deposited by Holloway in the Berg Collection of the New York Public Library in 1962. The manuscript repeats much of the argument of Free and Lonesome Heart and includes detailed appendices supporting his positions.

Holloway died in 1977.

== Reception ==
While Holloway's early work remains widely acknowledged as pioneering scholarship on Whitman's journalism and its influence on Leaves of Grass, his scholarly reputation has since dimmed considerably. This is largely due to his interpretation of Whitman's sexual identity, which already elicited criticism during Holloway's lifetime. Especially Holloway's insistence on Whitman having fathered children in New Orleans, as well as his purposeful mistranscriptions of manuscripts to hide Whitman's attraction to (and sexual relationships with) men, has drawn significant academic skepticism. Later biographers such as Gay Wilson Allen, Justin Kaplan, and Jerome Loving largely moved past Holloway's interpretive claims, even as they continued to draw on the editorial groundwork he laid.
