= The Long Memory (novel) =

1951 novel

- First edition (US)
- Author: Howard Clewes
- Language: English
- Genre: Crime
- Publisher: Macmillan (UK); Doubleday (US)
- Publication date: 1951
- Publication place: United Kingdom
- Media type: Print

The Long Memory is a 1951 crime novel by the British writer Howard Clewes. After seventeen years in prison for his role in a murder, Philip Davidson returns to his former haunt on the Kent side of the River Thames. He takes up residence in a derelict barge and plans his revenge against those who saw him sent to jail for a crime he did not commit. His progress is kept under observation by Bob Lowther, a police officer who married Davidson's girlfriend after he was convicted. Lowther has risen in the force since then, but has long had nagging doubts that his wife may have committed perjury. Davidson's bitterness against those who have wronged him is offset by his meeting of a young refugee woman who is equally an outsider in society. The story concludes with Davidson finding that the man he supposedly killed is alive and well in the Docklands of London.

== Film adaptation ==
In 1953 it was adapted into the British film noir The Long Memory directed by Robert Hamer and starring John Mills, John McCallum and Elizabeth Sellars. The film rights were acquired quickly after the book's publication by film producer Hugh Stewart. The film shifted the central focus from the police officer to the victim of injustice Philip Davidson.

== Bibliography ==
- Goble, Alan. The Complete Index to Literary Sources in Film. Walter de Gruyter, 1999.
- McFarlane, Brian. The Cinema of Britain and Ireland. Wallflower Press, 2005.
