= John Warren (actor) =

British screenwriter and actor (1916–1977)

John "Jack" Warner (1916–1977), known professionally as John Warren, was a British screenwriter and support actor. Specialising in comedy writing, he worked with several figures at the forefront of British comedy, such as Tommy Cooper, Peter Sellers, Dick Emery and Mike and Bernie Winters.

He had several screenwriting projects with film director Val Guest whom he first encountered as an actor in 1948.

== Biography ==
Warren was born on 13 November 1916 in England, UK. He was a writer and actor.

In the Second World War he served in the Royal Navy. Following his discharge, John pursued a career in films but only served in minor roles. He did however make many contacts and moved into scriptwriting in the late 50s, having considerably more success in this field.

John was known for Up the Creek (1958), Further Up the Creek (1958) and Hell Below Zero (1954).

He died on 9 February 1977 in Kingston upon Thames.

== Film Scripts ==
- Up The Creek (1958)
- Further Up the Creek (1959)
- Two-Way Stretch (1960)
- Life is a Circus (1960)
- Operation Snatch (1962)
- The Wrong Arm of the Law (1963)
- Rotten to the Core (1965)
- Ooh… You Are Awful (1972)

== TV Show Scripts ==
- Dave's Kingdom (1964)
- Fire Crackers (two episodes, 1965)
- Cooperama (1966) a showcase for Tommy Cooper
- Mike and Bernie's Show (1966) comedy showcase for Mike and Bernie Winters
- Life with Cooper (1966–1968) long-running showcase for Tommy Cooper
- The Stanley Baxter Show (one episode 1968) long-running showcase for Stanley Baxter
- As Good Cooks Go (seven episodes, 1969–70)
- Bernie (1878–1980) a series centred upon Bernie Winters
- The Dick Emery Show multiple scripts from 1963 to 1977
- It's Lulu (one episode, 1973) long-running showcase for Lulu
- The Dick Emery Christmas Show (1974)
- Dick Whittington TV movie (1972)
- Sacha's In Town (two episodes, 1972) showcase for Sacha Distel
- A Christmas Night to Remember, annual show broadcast in UK on Christmas Day - 1963, 1970 and 1971
- From a Bird's Eye View (one episode, 1970)

== Film Roles ==
A very frequent actor in support roles Warren was a well-known face but not a well-known name (and often went uncredited). His need to choose a new name stemmed from the pre-existence of the actor Jack Warner who was operating out of the same studios.

- When the Bough Breaks (1947) guest at party (uncredited)
- The Mark of Cain (1947) as Mr Wilkins (uncredited)
- One Night With You (1948) as ticket collector
- My Brother's Keeper (1948) as motorist at Nora's Garage (uncredited)
- Mr. Perrin and Mr. Traill (1948) as chauffeur
- William Comes to Town (1948) as circus official
- Warning to Wantons (1949) (uncredited)
- It's Not Cricket (1949) as orderly
- Marry Me! (1949) as newspaper reporter (uncredited)
- Up for the Cup (1950) as Cartwright
- Traveller's Joy (1950) as embassy manager (uncredited)
- Seven Days to Noon (1950) (uncredited)
- Shadow of the Past (1950) as furniture man
- The Reluctant Widow (1950)
- The Astonished Heart (1950) as barman
- Boys in Brown (1949) signalman (uncredited)
- A Case of Poisoning (1949) as the butcher
- Diamond City (1949) as the town crier
- The Franchise Affair (1951) as Charlie the pub landlord
- Laughter in Paradise (1951) as card player (uncredited)
- A Case for PC 49 (1951) as Coffee Dan
- High Treason (1951) as barman (uncredited)
- Encore (1951) as ship's officer in "Winter's Cruise" section
- Mr. Denning Drives North (1951) as Mr Ash
- Stolen Face (1952) as railway guard
- Gift Horse (1952) as man in crowd (uncredited)
- The Lost Hours (1952) as man with dog
- Made in Heaven (1952) as Keeper of the Wheel (uncredited)
- The Net (1953) as Ted (uncredited)
- Top of the Form (1953) as bookie (uncredited)
- Glad Tidings (1953) as barman
- Personal Affair (1953) as man in news room (uncredited)
- Meet Mr. Lucifer (1953) as man with hammer (uncredited)
- 36 Hours (1953) as clerk (uncredited)
- Trouble in Store (1953) as Master of Ceremonies (uncredited)
- Stryker of the Yard (1953)
- Hell Below Zero (1954) as hotel receptionist
- Fast and Loose (1954) as chauffeur
- Up to His Neck (1954) as Collins
- To Dorothy a Son (1954) as waiter (uncredited)
- Police Dog (1955) as Clerk of Works
- Passage Home (1955) as Cook
- One Good Turn (1955) as ticket collector (with Norman Wisdom)
- Bride of the Monster (1955) as Jake
- The Woman for Joe (1955) as workman in pub (uncredited)
- Secret Venture (1955) as bargee (uncredited)
- Portrait of Alison (1955) as postman (uncredited)
- Private's Progress as Sgt Major Gradwick
- Jumping for Joy (1956) as commentator at racetrack (uncredited)
- The Feminine Touch (1956) (uncredited)
- The Iron Petticoat (1956) as airport official (uncredited)
- Eyewitness (1956) as Joe the barman at British Legion (uncredited)
- The Last Man to Hang (1956) as passport official (uncredited)
- The Battle of the River Plate (1956) as chief signalman on HMS Exeter (uncredited)
- Brothers in Law (1957) as Mr Venner
- A Night To Remember (1958) as crewman on Titanic (uncredited)
- Up the Creek (1958) as Cooky
- Further Up the Creek (1959) as Cooky
- Free Love Confidential (1970)

== TV roles ==
- She Stoops to Conquer (1949 TV movie) as Stingo and Jeremy
- Stryker of the Yard (1961)
- Homicide (1967) as Sikorski
