= The Unknown Peter Sellers =

2000 made for television documentary

- DVD cover
- Genre: Documentary
- Written by: David Leaf; John Scheinfeld
- Directed by: David Leaf; John Scheinfeld
- Starring: Peter Sellers (archival footage)
- Narrated by: Fred Applegate
- Country of origin: United States
- Original language: English

Production
- Executive producers: Iris Frederick; Larry Adler
- Producers: David Leaf; John Scheinfeld
- Cinematography: Steve Robson; Arnie Sirlin; Orlando Stuart
- Editor: Mark S. Andrew
- Running time: 52 min.
- Production company: Crew Neck Productions

Original release
- Network: AMC
- Release: April 25, 2000

The Unknown Peter Sellers is a 2000 made for television documentary written, produced and directed by David Leaf and John Scheinfeld. It features video and audio clips from some of Sellers more obscure performances, along with his more notable portrayals such as Inspector Clouseau in The Pink Panther film series, and Dr. Strangelove, in which he portrayed three different characters.

The film also features interviews, commentary and archival footage from Shirley MacLaine, Melvyn Douglas, Spike Milligan, Graham Stark, Jack Warden, Mike Grady, Catherine Schell and many others.

The documentary premiered on April 25, 2000, on the cable channel AMC. It was released on DVD later that year in September 2000. It is also included as a bonus feature in the box-set The Pink Panther Film Collection, released in 2003.

== Synopsis ==
The documentary features short clips from his most notable films, and some of his more obscure performances, interviews, rare home footage taken from his home movies, and examples of his early work as an impressionist. The program begins with family photos of Sellers growing up, and his enlistment in the RAF at age 18, where he was part of the Gang Show entertainment troupe.

The documentary then moves on to his early career, highlighting his performances in Penny Points to Paradise, his feature film debut; the influential radio program The Goon Show and its successor BBC TV's series A Show Called Fred; and then excerpts from The Ladykillers, The Idiot Weekly, The Naked Truth, The Mouse That Roared and I'm All Right Jack, which won Sellers a BAFTA Best Actor Award.

There are clips from The Running Jumping & Standing Still Film, nominated for an Academy Award, Let's Go Crazy with Sellers as Groucho Marx, The Super Secret Service, A Day at the Beach, where he plays the part of a gay show owner, A Shot in the Dark, The Battle of the Sexes, The Naked Truth and The Millionairess, with Sophia Loren.

British film critic Alexander Walker tells the story of how Sellers was cast in The Pink Panther when Peter Ustinov backed out of the Inspector Clouseau role right before shooting was to begin, so Blake Edwards contacted Sellers, who agreed to do the part. Walker goes on to say that Sellers conceived Clouseau's appearance while flying to Italy to the film set. According to Walker, Seller was lighting his cigar with a box of Bryant & May matches which featured Captn Webb with a bushy mustache, and he had just bought a Burberry coat that morning, so Sellers decided that is how he would portray the character, with a bushy mustache and long trench coat, and that is how Inspector Clouseau's trademark look was born.

Walker also relays the story on how the ending of Dr. Strangelove was changed due to the assassination of John F. Kennedy. The original planned ending was to feature a scene involving a huge pie fight, with a cream pie being hurled in the face of the president, followed by the line: "Gentlemen our beloved president has been cut down in his prime." The filmmakers decided it would be insensitive and it was cut. Walker says that even though the pie fight scene was cut, you can still see the pies sitting on the table during the scene. The documentary had still photos of the pie throwing scene which were shown.

Peter Sellers was an explosive mixture of talent, ambition and contradiction.

— Fred Applegate

The program winds down with one of his last films, Being There (1979), which earned him an Oscar nomination for Best Actor. The film ends with commentary from the various participants in the documentary offering praise for Sellers, and clips of his commercials for Barclays, which would be his last appearance on film.

== Cast ==
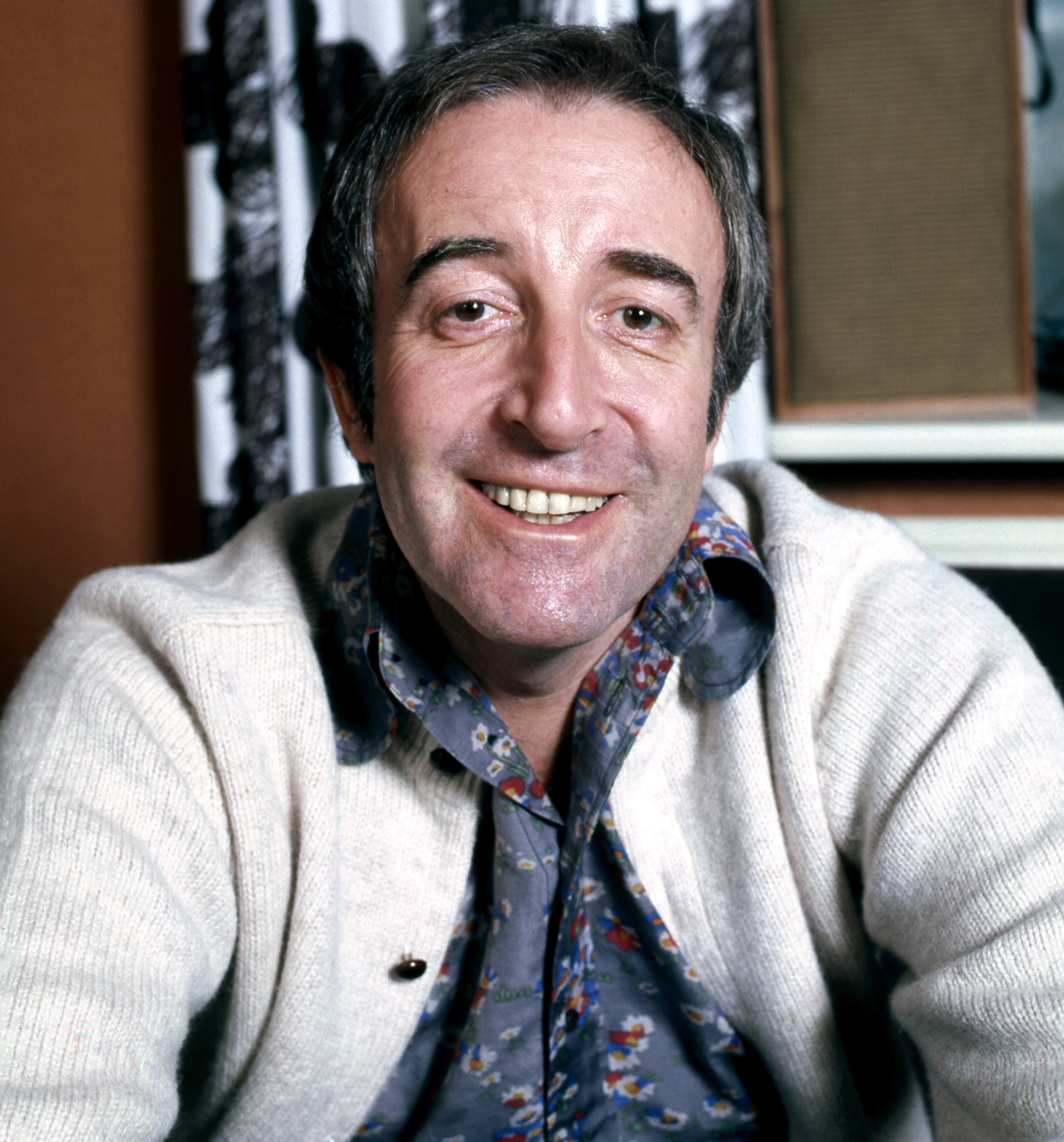
Peter Sellers (pictured in 1973) was one of the best known comedians of his generation.

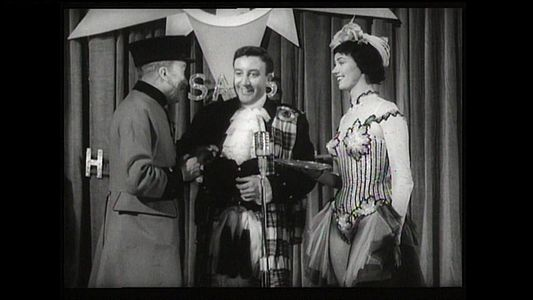
Sellers (in the middle) in Mario Zampis 1957 film The Naked Truth

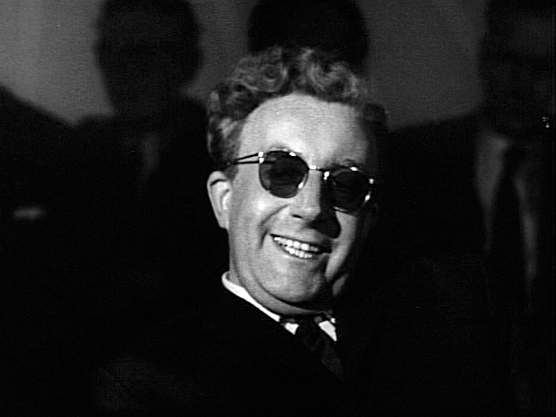
Sellers in Stanley Kubricks 1964 film Dr. Strangelove

- Peter Sellers (archival footage)
- Fred Applegate (narrator)
- Alexander Walker
- David Lodge
- Joe McGrath
- Harry Secombe
- David Frost
- Michael Palin
- Richard Lester
- Shirley MacLaine
- Melvyn Douglas
- Spike Milligan
- Graham Stark
- Jack Warden
- Mike Grady
- Catherine Schell

== Release and home media ==
The documentary premiered on April 25, 2000, on the cable channel AMC, as part of their "Hollywood Reel to Reel" series. The 1962 film Waltz of the Toreadors, which features Sellers as an ex–military officer followed the documentary. The program was broadcast again on April 30, with the same movie afterwards.

The DVD was released in September 2000 by WinStar Media. Extra features on the DVD include a complete collection of Seller's TWA and Barclays commercials, with some outtakes from those commercials, his filmography, and a 1971 video interview with Sellers. The documentary was also included as a bonus feature in the box-set The Pink Panther Film Collection.

== Reception ==
Stephen Rees wrote in the Library Journal that while the video "unearths many rare film clips and audio bits sure to interest any true Sellers fan; the video reveals almost nothing of Sellers the man." The Video Librarian stated that "the narrative points out, quite correctly, that Sellers increasing experimentation with physical comedy was critical to the development of his work, while commentary from friends and colleagues firm up this wide-ranging portrait of one of the true comic geniuses of modern film."

American journalist Dorothy Rabinowitz wrote, "the documentary offers the usual mix of film clips, commentators, biography and the like, but it is in a number of ways superior to the usual run of film bios that show up on movie channels." She further opines that the program reveals "details of Sellers's career that aren't particularly well known ... unhappy marriages, and various other problems that aren't entirely familiar — and haven't been rendered humdrum by repetition."

Film critic Tom Shales commented that the film "is nicely done and absolutely essential for Sellers fans, even if obviously hampered by budget constraints." He does fault the documentary for falling victim to the "A&E Biography and VH1 Behind the Music syndromes of trying to squeeze every last drop of melodrama out of a subject's life." DVD Talk wrote in their review that "it provides a loving and rare look at Seller's best work; for those who know Sellers only from his Hollywood films this is a great introduction to his short but diverse career."

== See also ==
- List of British actors
- List of Academy Award winners and nominees from Great Britain
- Peter Sellers on stage, radio, screen and record
