= Miranda Connell =

British television presenter (born 1938)

- Born: 3 August 1938 (age 88); Stansted Mountfitchet, Essex, United Kingdom
- Occupations: TV presenter, actress
- Known for: Play School
- Spouse: Edward de Souza

Miranda Connell (born 3 August 1938, Stansted, Essex) is an English television presenter and character actress, who was best known as an early presenter on Play School on the BBC, between 1966 and 1975.

== Biography ==
Connell attended Elmhurst Ballet School and the Cheltenham Ladies' College.

She appeared on stage in Stratford-upon-Avon and the West End. She was in the 1957 comedy Silver Wedding by Michael Clayton Hutton.

On television she is best known for being a Play School presenter from May 1966 to April 1975. She also appeared as Lady Agatha in the 1957 film The Admirable Crichton, and in various cult TV shows including The Avengers, Dixon of Dock Green, Armchair Theatre, Paul Temple and Special Branch.

She married actor Edward de Souza in 1960.
