= Tom Gill (actor) =

British actor (1916–1971)

- in TV's The Invisible Man (1959)
- Born: 26 July 1916; Newcastle upon Tyne, Northumberland, England
- Died: 22 July 1971 (aged 54); London, England
- Occupation: Actor

Tom Gill (26 July 1916 – 22 July 1971) was a British actor who was born in Newcastle upon Tyne, Northumberland, England. He made his stage debut in 1935, and his theatre work included the original production of Noël Coward's After the Ball at the Globe Theatre in 1954. In 1951 he appeared at the Duchess Theatre in London's West End in the comedy play The Happy Family by Michael Clayton Hutton and reprised his role in the subsequent film adaptation.

== Selected filmography ==
- Midshipman Easy (1935)
- The High Command (1937)
- Meet Mr. Penny (1938)
- Trunk Crime (1939)
- Something in the City (1950)
- Mr Drake's Duck (1951)
- The Happy Family (1952)
- Love in Pawn (1953)
- The Limping Man (1953)
- Jumping for Joy (1956)
- Fun at St. Fanny's (1956)
- Behind the Headlines (1956)
- Carry On Admiral (1957)
- After the Ball (1957)
- Up the Creek (1958)
- Blind Spot (1958)
- Further Up the Creek (1958)
- The Navy Lark (1959)
- Carry On Constable (1960)
- The Fourth Square (1961)
- Echo of Diana (1963)
- Smokescreen (1964)
- The Night Caller (1965)
- The Mini-Affair (1967) - Salesman
