= Maureen Pryor =

British actress (1922–1977)

- in Orders Are Orders (1954)
- Born: Maureen Arabella St John Pook; 23 May 1922; Limerick, Ireland
- Died: 5 May 1977 (aged 54); London, England
- Occupation: Actress
- Spouse(s): Stephen Lushington (m.1941 – ?; divorced); Thomas S. Barry (1961 – ?; separated)
- Children: One son

Maureen St John Pook (23 May 1922 – 5 May 1977), known professionally as Maureen Pryor, was an Irish-born English character actress who made stage, film, and television appearances. The Encyclopaedia of British Film noted, "she never played leads, but, with long rep and TV experience (from 1949), she was noticeable in all she did."

== Early life ==
Pryor was born in Limerick, Ireland, to a British father and an Irish mother. She began acting with Manchester Repertory in 1938, and studied with Michel Saint-Denis at the London Theatre Studio in 1939.

== Career ==
She appeared in the West End in Michael Clayton Hutton's Power Without Glory, Seán O'Casey's Red Roses for Me, Noël Coward's Peace in Our Time, John Griffith Bowen's After the Rain (also on Broadway), Doris Lessing's Play with a Tiger and plays such as Little Boxes and Where's Tedd. She was a member of the Stables Theatre Company. She also appeared on Broadway in the premiere season of Boeing-Boeing (1965). In Manchester, she appeared in Eugene O'Neill's one-act play Before Breakfast, directed by Bill Gilmour. She also directed the play herself, for the RSC at the Old Red Lion, Stratford, in 1975. She played Mistress Quickly in Terry Hand's 1975/76 production of Henry IV, Part 2 and Henry V also for the Royal Shakespeare Company.

She made over 500 television appearances, including a Play for Today, "O Fat White Woman" (1971), adapted by William Trevor from his own short story, and Ken Russell's television film Song of Summer (1968), in which she played Jelka Delius, the long-suffering wife of the composer Frederick Delius. Russell cast her again in his cinema film The Music Lovers (1970) as Tchaikovsky's mother-in-law. In the 1974 BBC television series Shoulder to Shoulder, she played the composer Dame Ethel Smyth.

In the 1970s British police drama The Sweeney, episode Big Spender, she appeared as Edith Wardle the wife of a dishonest employee of a car park company who becomes involved in an elaborate fraud.

== Personal life ==
Her first marriage ended in divorce, her second in separation. She had one son, Mark. She died in 1977 from a heart ailment.

== Selected filmography ==
- Room for Two (1940)
- The Lady with a Lamp (1951) – Sister Wheeler
- The Weak and the Wicked (1954) – Prison Matron
- Doctor in the House (1954) – Mrs. Cooper
- Orders Are Orders (1954) – Miss Marigold
- Angel Pavement (1957–1958, TV series) – Mrs. Smeeth
- The Secret Place (1957) – Mrs. Haywood
- Doctor at Large (1957) – Mrs. Dalton
- Heart of a Child (1958) – Frau Spiel
- Conspiracy of Hearts (1960) – Sister Consuela
- The Secret Kingdom (1960, TV series) – Paula Byron
- No Love for Johnnie (1961) – Labour Party Member
- Life for Ruth (1962) – Teddy's mother
- Madhouse on Castle Street (TV, 1963; Mrs Griggs; this was Bob Dylan's acting debut)
- Modesty Blaise (1966) – (scenes deleted)
- The Sandwich Man (1966)
- Three Bites of the Apple (1967) – Birdie Guffy
- Song of Summer (1968, TV movie) - Jelka Delius (Rosen)
- The Music Lovers (1970) – Nina's Mother
- Lady Caroline Lamb (1972) – Mrs. Buller
- The National Health (1973) – The Matron
- Shoulder to Shoulder (1974, BBC TV; as ) – Dame Ethel Smyth
- The Black Windmill (1974) – Jane Harper
- The Sweeney (1975) – Enid Wardle
