= Noel Hood =

British actress (1909–1979)

- Hood as Edith Charters in 1941 film Crook's Tour
- Born: Margaret Noel Hood; 25 December 1909; Bristol, Gloucestershire, England
- Died: 15 October 1979 (aged 69); London, England
- Occupation: Actress
- Years active: 1941-1972
- Spouse: Charles Oliver (m. 1938–1979)
- Children: 2

Margaret Noel Hood (25 December 1909 – 15 October 1979) was a British actress. She was married to the Irish-born actor Charles Oliver.

== Filmography ==
=== Film ===
- Crook's Tour (1940) as Edith Charters
- Personal Affair (1953) as 4th Gossip (uncredited)
- The Million Pound Note (1954) as Mrs. Waldron-Smythe (uncredited)
- The Belles of St. Trinian's (1954) as Bilston School Mistress
- The Constant Husband (1955) as Friends and Relations - Gladys
- The Curse of Frankenstein (1957) as Aunt Sophia
- How to Murder a Rich Uncle (1957) as Aunt Marjorie
- High Flight (1957) as Tweedy Lady
- The Surgeon's Knife (1957) as Sister Slater
- Rx Murder (1958) as Lady Watson
- The Duke Wore Jeans (1958) as Lady Marguerite
- The Inn of the Sixth Happiness (1958) as Miss Thompson
- The Son of Robin Hood (1958) as Prioress
- Idol on Parade (1959) as School Mistress
- Bobbikins (1959) as Nurse
- Devil's Bait (1959) as Mrs. Davies
- Two Way Stretch (1960) as Miss Prescott
- The Angry Silence (1960) as Miss Bennett
- No Kidding (1960) as Vicar's wife
- Satan Never Sleeps (1962) as Sister Justine (uncredited)
- Tamahine (1963) as Mrs. MacFarlane

=== Television ===
- Emergency – Ward 10 (1957–1967) as Mrs. Anderson
- Adventure story (1961)
- Oliver Twist (1962)
- From a Bird's Eye View (1970–1971) as Ms. Fosdyke
