= Operation Snatch =

1962 British film by Robert Day

- Directed by: Robert Day
- Written by: Alan Hackney; Len Heath; John Warren
- Story by: Paul Mills
- Produced by: Jules Buck
- Starring: Terry-Thomas; George Sanders; Lionel Jeffries; Jocelyn Lane
- Cinematography: Geoffrey Faithfull
- Edited by: Bert Rule
- Music by: Ken Jones
- Distributed by: Regal Films International (UK)
- Release date: March 1962 (UK)
- Running time: 87 min.
- Country: United Kingdom
- Language: English

Operation Snatch (also known as Top Secret) is a 1962 British comedy film starring Terry-Thomas and George Sanders and directed by Robert Day. It was written by Alan Hackney, Len Heath and John Warren from a story by Paul Mills.

== Plot ==
The story takes place in Gibraltar, and is based on a local legend: if the resident Barbary apes were ever to leave, the British would lose Gibraltar. This wartime comedy has Terry-Thomas as the keeper of the apes. When one of the apes goes missing, he is required to go behind enemy lines to capture another one, or be personally responsible for the loss of Gibraltar.

== Cast ==
- Terry-Thomas as Lieutenant Wigg
- George Sanders as Major Hobson
- Lionel Jeffries as Evans
- Jocelyn Lane as Bianca Tabori
- Mark Eden as Mosquito pilot
- Mario Fabrizi as Tall Man
- John Gabriel as Major Frink
- Gerard Heinz as Colonel Waldock
- Bernard Hunter as Captain Baker
- Dinsdale Landen as Captain Wellington
- Howard H. Lang as P.T. Sergeant
- Angus Lennie as Vic
- Jeremy Lloyd as Captain James
- John Meillon as medical officer
- Warren Mitchell as contact man
- Lee Montague as Miklos Tabori
- Nyree Dawn Porter as W.R.A.C. officer
- John Scott as Lieutenant General Hepworth
- Mark Singleton as Prime Minister's secretary
- Graham Stark as soldier
- Michael Trubshawe as Colonel Marston
- James Villiers as Lieutenant Keen
- Ian Whittaker as Dyson
- Ronnie Corbett appears in an uncredited role disguised as a Gibraltar Rock Ape

== Production ==
Finance was raised on the strength of Terry-Thomas' name and a rough outline, due to the actor's popularity in America. Terry-Thomas said "It seems I am just at the moment a 'thing.’ They are intrigued by me. They haven’t got anything like me, I don’t think it’s only my accent. Perhaps my face?”

== Reception ==
The Monthly Film Bulletin wrote: "Clumsy British farce, in which a badly directed Terry-Thomas endeavours to extract laughs from a wan script which pins its faith in jokes about monkeys, bananas, thickly-accented spies and fatuous British espionage agents."

The Radio Times Guide to Films gave the film 3/5 stars, calling it "enjoyably daft," writing: "There are too many stock characters, but this does have several ridiculously funny scenes."

== See also ==
- Barbary macaques in Gibraltar § Legend
