= The Running Jumping & Standing Still Film =

1959 British film by Richard Lester

- Title card
- Directed by: Dick Lester; Peter Sellers
- Screenplay by: Spike Milligan; Peter Sellers; Mario Fabrizi; Dick Lester
- Story by: Peter Sellers
- Produced by: Peter Sellers
- Starring: Peter Sellers; Spike Milligan
- Cinematography: Dick Lester
- Edited by: Dick Lester; Peter Sellers
- Music by: Dick Lester
- Production company: Peter Sellers Productions
- Distributed by: British Lion Films
- Release date: November 1959
- Running time: 11 minutes
- Country: United Kingdom
- Language: English
- Budget: £70

The Running Jumping & Standing Still Film is a 1959 British experimental sketch comedy short film directed by Richard Lester and Peter Sellers, in collaboration with Bruce Lacey.

It was a favourite of The Beatles, especially John Lennon, which led to Lester being hired to direct A Hard Day's Night (1964), Help! (1965), and How I Won The War (1966), which starred Lennon. In Help!, Lacey makes a guest appearance as George Harrison's gardener in the sequence where the group arrive at their "home".

== Synopsis ==
The short consists of a series of surreal vignettes which transpire in the English countryside and involve a rotating array of protagonists. It begins with a man watching through a telescope how an old woman cleans a meadow with a rag and bucket. Other examples are a photographer who tries to develop a film in the water of a lake after wrapping a black piece of cloth around his head, or an athlete who is performing push-ups and is then used as the seat for the model of a portrait painter. The model has numbers on her face which the painter uses to choose the correct colours from his numbered palette. The same athlete later throws a hammer, which is then shot down like a skeet shooting target by a hunter. The film ends with a man wearing a top hat and a single boxing glove knocking out another man he had been luring for a long time. The man then enters a hut, undresses, puts the boxing glove back on and goes to sleep, turning off the light and ending the movie.

== Cast ==
- Richard Lester
- Peter Sellers
- Spike Milligan
- Mario Fabrizi
- Bruce Lacey
- David Lodge
- Leo McKern
- Norman Rossington
- Graham Stark
- Dick Bentley
- John Vyvyan

== Production ==
It was filmed over two Sundays in 1959, at a cost of around £70 (equivalent to £1,416 in 2025) (including £5 for the rental of a field).

== Critical reception ==
The Monthly Film Bulletin wrote: "Perhaps it is not all quite abstract: the Goons are so solemn and self-possessed in their pursuits; and these pursuits are so absurdly improbable and fruitless, that one suspects the film has a meaning and a universal application. In style it lies somewhere between the anarchic surrealism of Bunuel and Dali, and the quainter, more humane fantasies of Carroll and Lear. Progressing from the television screen (the director there too was Dick Lester) one feels a move nearer to the former; the comedy is a shade less genial, more abruptly startling. The touch of the Victorian, however, is fortified by the use of a muddy sepia tone in printing the film. The Running, Jumping and Standing Still Film is only a sketch; but it does not diminish the prospective fascination of the Goon team."

BFI Screenonline concluded that the film's lasting legacy "was its influence (as part of Milligan's overall body of work) on British comedy in general, and on Monty Python's Flying Circus (BBC, 1969–74) in particular. This is evident not only in its surreal humour, but in the way that elements of one routine are threaded through subsequent scenes, transcending the stand-alone sketch form—a tactic subsequently favoured by the Python team."

Empire magazine called it "Sublime slapstick surrealism."

== Releases ==
The film has been made available as a special feature on several home video releases of A Hard Day's Night. It is featured in The Unknown Peter Sellers (TV documentary, 2000) and a British Film Institute released collection of rarely seen films from Bruce Lacey's career entitled The Lacey Rituals. It is also included as a special feature of the StudioCanal issue of I'm All Right Jack (1959).

== Accolades ==
It was nominated for the 1959 Academy Award for Best Live Action Short Subject, but lost to the Jacques Cousteau (producer) film The Golden Fish (1959).

== See also ==
- List of avant-garde films of the 1950s
