= Up the Creek (1958 film) =

1958 British film by Val Guest

- Directed by: Val Guest
- Written by: Val Guest; Len Heath; John Warren
- Produced by: Henry Halstead
- Starring: David Tomlinson; Peter Sellers; Wilfrid Hyde-White
- Cinematography: Arthur Grant; Moray Grant
- Edited by: Helen Wiggins
- Music by: Tony Fones; Tony Lowry
- Production company: Byron Film Production
- Distributed by: Warner Bros
- Release date: 2 June 1958; (UK)
- Running time: 83 minutes
- Country: United Kingdom
- Language: English

Up the Creek is a 1958 British comedy film directed by Val Guest and starring David Tomlinson, Peter Sellers, Wilfrid Hyde-White, David Lodge and Lionel Jeffries. It was written by Guest, Len Heath and John Warren.

It was released in UK on June 21, 1958, and in the US on November 10, 1958.

== Plot ==
Lieutenant Humphrey Fairweather, a well-meaning but accident-prone naval officer with a passion for rockets, is posted where he can (so the navy hopes) cause no further damage. He is given command of a mothballed Royal Navy vessel, HMS Berkeley, which has had no commanding officer for several years. She is moored at a wharf on the Suffolk coast near the (fictional) village of Meadows End.

He discovers that the ship is woefully under strength and is forced to contend with the schemes of his bosun, Chief Petty Officer Doherty. He and the crew are running several profitable businesses, including a same-day laundry, selling naval rum and cigarettes to the local pub, the Pig and Whistle, and making pies and pastries for sale to the villagers. They also keep pigs and hens. After the naive Fairweather is innocently drawn into the enterprises, he is politely blackmailed into covering for them.

But when an admiral makes a surprise inspection, the story eventually comes out. Whilst angrily haranguing them, Admiral Foley accidentally launches Fairweather's experimental rocket, and the ship is sunk. Because of Fairweather's impeccable connections at the Admiralty, and because the Berkeley was Admiral Foley's first command, Fairwather is not court-martialed. Instead, he is promoted to lieutenant-commander and posted to Woomera to continue his rocketry research, accompanied by Susanne, the attractive French girl he met at the pub. The ship's crew are posted to another ship, HMS Incorruptible.

== Cast ==
- David Tomlinson as Lieutenant Fairweather
- Peter Sellers as Chief Petty Officer Doherty
- Wilfrid Hyde-White as Admiral Foley
- Vera Day as Lily
- Liliane Sottane as Susanne
- Tom Gill as Flag Lieutenant
- Michael Goodliffe as Nelson
- Reginald Beckwith as publican of "Pig and Whistle"
- Lionel Murton as Perkins
- John Warren as "Cooky"
- Lionel Jeffries as "Steady" Barker
- Howard Williams as Bunts
- Peter Collingwood as "Chippie"
- Barry Lowe as Webster
- Edwin Richfield as Bennett
- David Lodge as Scouse
- Leonard Fenton as policeman
- Sam Kydd as Bates
- Basil Dignam as Coombes
- Patrick Cargill as Commander
- Michael Ripper as decorator
- Frank Pettingell as stationmaster

== Production ==
The original script was written by two writers and was rewritten by Val Guest.

Much of the film was shot at Thomas Ward Ship Breakers, Grays, Essex. The ship, although referred to by a character in the film as a sloop, was ex-Castle-class corvette, HMS Berkeley Castle.

According to an interview with Val Guest (included on the DVD issue of the film), Up the Creek was the first starring film role for Sellers, at the time known only for radio, short television sketches and film supporting roles. Guest was only able to obtain his services by also including established comedy film star David Tomlinson.

A sequel Further Up the Creek was released later in the same year (1958), with Frankie Howerd replacing Peter Sellers.

== Reception ==
=== Box office ===
Kine Weekly listed it as being "in the money" at the British box office in 1958. Guest says the film was "an absolute smash".

=== Critical reception ===
Kine Weekly said "Breezy naval comedy. ... New and time-honoured gags are vigorously mixed by a popular and shrewdly chosen team and slickly served against agreeable and appropriate backgrounds. ... The picture puts many of its eggs in one basket – much of its action takes place on the Berkeley – but even so there is no lack of variety or pace. David Tomlinson contributes a characteristic performance as the nervous, befuddled, yet ingratiauing. Humphrey. Peter Sellers displays versatility as the artful bosun, Wilfred Hyde White scores as the wily old Admiral Foley, Liliane Sottane makes a promising debut as Susanne, and the supporting types, stock, but thoroughly dusted, are neatly deployed."

In British Sound Films: The Studio Years 1928–1959 David Quinlan rated the film as "good", writing: "Broad but funny traditional farce; could have done with lighter handling."

Leslie Halliwell said: "Cheeky remake of Oh Mr Porter. Jokes fair, atmosphere cheerful and easy-going."

The New York Times called the film "an amiable jest that is diverting and spasmodically amusing, if not precisely unuproarious."

TV Guide wrote, "it is a surprise that Up the Creek is as fresh and amusing as it is ... Sellers, in one of his earliest roles, steals the show."

The Radio Times Guide to Films gave the film 3/5 stars, writing: "Veteran writer/director Val Guest and an experienced cast of farceurs enliven this British naval farce with its timeworn story of an incompetent officer pitted against the wily lower ranks. Silly, accident-prone David Tomlinson is given the command of an ancient destroyer, where Peter Sellers controls the rackets. The chaos when admiral Wilfrid Hyde White arrives for an inspection is extremely funny. The film's success inspired a sequel, Further up the Creek [1958]."
