= David Lodge (actor) =

British actor (1921–2003)

- Lodge in The Intimate Stranger (1956)
- Born: David William Frederick Lodge; 19 August 1921; Rochester, Kent, England
- Died: 18 October 2003 (aged 82); Northwood, London, England
- Occupation: Actor
- Years active: 1954–1997
- Spouse: Marilyn Garcia (m. 1963; died 1996)

David William Frederick Lodge (19 August 1921 – 18 October 2003) was an English actor.

== Career ==
During the Second World War, Lodge served in the RAF. Before turning to acting he worked as a circus clown. He also appeared in Gang Shows and variety before making his screen debut in The Cockleshell Heroes and going on to feature in many British films usually portraying military types, and often comedic roles.

Lodge was a close friend of Peter Sellers and appeared as part of Spike Milligan's team on his Q programmes (a running gag being that in each episode he or Spike would mention his role in The Cockleshell Heroes).

Lodge was very prolific during the 1950s and in 1958 alone he appeared in ten films.

In 1967 Lodge was in The Avengers episode entitled ("Epic") in which he played the actor policeman killed by Peter Wyngarde. He appeared in a 1969 episode of Randall and Hopkirk Deceased ("Who Killed Cock Robin?"), and continuing with his military-type roles as Company Sergeant-Major Sharp in an episode of It Ain't Half Hot Mum in 1976. Lodge appeared in Carry On England. He played the role of drunk Captain Bull who is replaced as Captain of the Battery by Captain S. Melly (Kenneth Connor).

Lodge appeared in five Carry On films and several of the TV series episodes. He appeared as a policeman in the opening episode of the legal drama The Main Chance and again in a later episode. He also appeared in two of the On the Buses films playing smaller roles.

Lodge was also a regular in the Q5 series from Spike Milligan appearing in 22 episodes as various characters.

Lodge appeared as 'Pop Garret' in episode 1 series 2 Chalk and Cheese of The Sweeney, and as 'Soldier Atkins' in the Minder episode Rocky Eight and a Half (both characters being boxing trainers). He was a member of the Grand Order of Water Rats, and served as its "King Rat".

== Selected filmography ==
- Orders Are Orders (1954) as Bit Role (uncredited)
- The Cockleshell Heroes (1955) as Marine Ruddock
- Private's Progress (1956) as Lance Corporal Parsons (uncredited)
- Women Without Men (A.K.A. Blonde Bait) (1956) as Patrick
- The Intimate Stranger (1956) as Police Sgt. Brown
- The Long Arm (1956) as Detective Car Lot. (uncredited)
- The Counterfeit Plan (1957) as Sam Watson
- These Dangerous Years (1957) as Sgt. Lockwood
- Strangers' Meeting (1957) as Fred
- The Naked Truth (1957) as Constable Johnson
- The Silent Enemy (1958) as Sergeant
- Scotland Yard (film series) ('The Crossroad Gallows') (1958) as Inspector Travers
- The Safecracker (1958) as Parachute Instructor
- No Time to Die (1958) as Maj. Fred Patterson, Australian POW
- Up the Creek (1958) as Scouse
- Ice Cold in Alex (1958) as C.M.P. Captain (Tank Trap)
- Girls at Sea (1958) as Cpl. Duckett
- I Was Monty's Double (1958) as Sergeant R.A.P.C.
- Further Up the Creek (1958) as Scouse
- I Only Arsked! (1958) as Sergeant Potty Chambers
- Idol on Parade (1959) as Shorty
- Life in Emergency Ward 10 (1959) as Mr. Phillips
- Yesterday's Enemy (1959) as Perkins
- Bobbikins (1959) as Hargreave – Investigator from Scotland Yard
- The Ugly Duckling (1959) as Peewee
- I'm All Right Jack (1959) as Card Player
- The Running Jumping & Standing Still Film (1959) (uncredited)
- Two-Way Stretch (1960) as Jelly Knight
- Jazz Boat (1960) as Holy Mike
- The League of Gentlemen (1960) as C.S.M.
- Never Let Go (1960) as Cliff
- Watch Your Stern (1960) as Security sergeant
- The Bulldog Breed (1960) as CPO Knowles
- The Hellfire Club (1961) as Timothy
- Carry On Regardless (1961) as Wine Connoisseur
- No My Darling Daughter (1961) as Flanigan
- Raising the Wind (1961) as Taxi Driver
- Mrs. Gibbons' Boys (1962) as Frank Gibbons
- Go to Blazes (1962) as Sergeant
- The Pirates of Blood River (1962) as Smith
- Captain Clegg (1962) as Navy Bosun
- The Boys (1962) as Mr. Herne
- Kill or Cure (1962) as Richards – Male Nurse
- The Dock Brief (1962) as Frank Bateson the Lodger
- On the Beat (1962) as Inspector Cecil Hobson
- Two Left Feet (1963) as Bill
- The Long Ships (1964) as Olla
- Saturday Night Out (1964) as Arthur
- A Shot in the Dark (1964) as Georges Duval, the Ballon gardener
- Guns at Batasi (1964) as Sgt. 'Muscles' Dunn
- The Amorous Adventures of Moll Flanders (1965) as Ship's captain
- Catch Us If You Can (1965) as Louis
- The Intelligence Men (1965) as Stage Manager
- San Ferry Ann (1965) as Dad
- Cup Fever (1965) as Mr. Bates
- The Alphabet Murders (1965) as Sergeant
- The Early Bird (1965) as Angry Husband (uncredited)
- The Wrong Box (1966) as Corpse Remover (uncredited)
- The Sandwich Man (1966) as Charlie
- After the Fox as Corpse Remover (uncredited)
- Press for Time (1966) as Mr. Ross (editor, 'Tinmouth Times')
- Casino Royale (1967) (uncredited)
- Smashing Time (1967) as The Caretaker
- Seven Times Seven (1968) as Police Sergeant
- Only When I Larf (1968)
- Corruption (1968) as Groper
- Headline Hunters (1968) as Harry
- The Fixer (1968) as Zhitnyak
- What's Good for the Goose (1969) as Porter
- Crooks and Coronets (1969) as Policeman
- Oh! What a Lovely War (1969) as Recruiting Sergeant at Music Hall
- The Smashing Bird I Used to Know (1969) as Richard Johnson
- The Magic Christian (1969) as Ship's Guide
- Incense for the Damned (1970) as Colonel
- Scream and Scream Again (1970) as Detective Inspector Phil Strickland (credit only)
- Eyewitness (1970) as Local Policeman
- Hoffman (1970) as Foreman
- Toomorrow (1970) as 1st Policeman (uncredited)
- Scramble (1970) (uncredited)
- The Railway Children (1970) as Bandmaster
- On the Buses (1971) as Busman
- The Magnificent Seven Deadly Sins (1971) as Guest Appearance (segment "Sloth")
- The Fiend (1972) as C.I.D. Inspector
- Nobody Ordered Love (1972) as Sergeant
- Mutiny on the Buses (1972) as Safari Guard
- Raising the Roof (1972) as Manager
- Hide and Seek (1972) as Baker
- The Amazing Mr. Blunden (1972) as Mr. Wickens
- Go for a Take (1972) as Graham
- Carry On Girls (1973) as Police Inspector
- Ghost in the Noonday Sun (1973) as Zante
- QB VII (1974) as Sgt. Flory
- Carry On Dick (1974) as Bullock
- The Return of the Pink Panther (1975) as Mac, the Litton valet
- Carry On Behind (1975) as Landlord
- Carry On England (1976) as Captain Bull
- Sahara (1983) as Ewing
- Bloodbath at the House of Death (1984) as Inspector Goule
- Edge of Sanity (1989) as Underwood
