= Silver Wedding (play) =

1957 play

- Written by: Michael Clayton Hutton
- Original language: English
- Genre: Comedy
- Setting: Chelsea, London, present day

Premiere
- Date premiered: 15 April 1957
- Place premiered: Opera House, Manchester

Silver Wedding is a 1957 comedy play by the British author Michael Clayton Hutton. First performed four years after the author's death, it premiered at the Opera House, Manchester before transferring to London's West End where it ran for 158 performances between 9 July and 23 November 1957 initially at the Cambridge Theatre before transferring to the Winter Garden Theatre. The West End cast included Evelyn Laye, Frank Lawton, Marie Lohr, Miranda Connell and Catherine Boyle.

== Synopsis ==
Sir Robert and Lady Lydia Marlowe have spent many years abroad in the diplomatic service. On the morning of their twenty fifth wedding anniversary she announces that they should go their own separate ways. Her present for the wedding is a series of love letters he had written to different women throughout his career, each of whom she befriended.

== Bibliography ==
- Wearing, J.P. The London Stage 1950–1959: A Calendar of Productions, Performers, and Personnel. Rowman & Littlefield, 2014.
