= Ty Jeffries =

British musician & cabaret performer

Ty Jeffries in 2019

Ty Jeffries (born Timothy Jeffries) is a British composer, lyricist, pianist and singer. He is best known for his onstage persona of Miss Hope Springs. He is the son of British character actor, screenwriter and director Lionel Jeffries.

== Early life ==
Jeffries was born in Beaconsfield, Buckinghamshire. His childhood was split between schools in England and Los Angeles.

He appeared alongside his father on an edition of Simon Dee's chat show Dee Time in 1968.

He began playing the piano and writing songs at age of five. He performed for guests at family parties, including Elmer Bernstein, Fred Astaire, Shirley MacLaine and Diana Dors.

At 14, he was offered his first publishing deal by songwriter/publishing duo Bill Martin and Phil Coulter. In 1984 he signed as a songwriter to Elton John’s publishing company Rocket Music.

Jeffries attended The Purcell School of Music in London where he studied piano, violin, voice and composition. He has a BA in performance art.

While living in New York, Jeffries became friends with Andy Warhol, Keith Haring and Jean Michel Basquiat, and composed music for fashion shows at The Palladium nightclub.

== Career ==
He began his professional career as a musician playing the piano and singing nightly at venues such as Langan’s Brasserie in Mayfair, The Roof Gardens in Kensington and The Ritz Hotel, Piccadilly.

In the 1990s, Jeffries was the keyboard player for Billy Mackenzie and The Associates. He worked with Neneh Cherry and Chaka Khan. He wrote songs for Carol Kenyon and is credited as co-writer on Kenyon's "Warrior Woman".

He is a member of the British Academy of Songwriters Composers and Authors, Incorporated Society of Musicians and The Royal Society of Musicians of Great Britain.

His musical style spans classical, vaudeville, music hall and Golden Age Hollywood musicals, as well as more experimental styles. He is a former mentee of Vangelis.

== Miss Hope Springs ==
Ty Jeffries as Miss Hope Springs and Lorna Luft backstage of their concerts at The Crazy Coqs, 2019

Jeffries is best known for his onstage persona of Miss Hope Springs, playing the piano and singing his cabaret songs. Jeffries plays Springs as a tragicomic ‘recovering showgirl’ looking back on her life and career. He has said that the character draws on the work of Danny La Rue, Jim Bailey, Victor Borge and Blossom Dearie and is inspired partly by memories of fading Hollywood icons visiting his childhood home, as well as memories of him and his father watching old black-and-white films together.

In 2016, Jeffries became one of the distinguished group of non-classical artists (including David Bowie) to play at Wigmore Hall.

On 5th Dec 2024 Ty Jeffries/Miss Hope Springs was the subject of University of Michigan Penny Stamps Distinguished Speakers Series.

== Awards ==
- The Latest Loves... Award - Brighton Fringe for "I've Been Around " 2021
- Best Cabaret BroadwayWorld Edinburgh Fringe Festival Awards 2019
- Best Musical Variety Act London Cabaret Awards (shortlisted nominee) 2015
- Best Cabaret The Stage 2013
- So So Gay Best Stage Production 2012
- Best Cabaret Brighton Fringe 2011
