= Dead Secret (play) =

1952 play

- Written by: Michael Clayton Hutton
- Original language: English
- Genre: Thriller
- Setting: England, present day

Premiere
- Date premiered: 29 September 1952
- Place premiered: Her Majesty's Theatre, Brighton

Dead Secret is a 1952 thriller play by the British writer Michael Clayton Hutton. A murder mystery, it premiered at Her Majesty's Theatre, Brighton before transferring to London's West End where it ran for 29 performances at St James's Theatre between 5 November and 29 November 1952. The West End cast featured Ian Hunter, Hugh Wakefield, Joyce Heron and Sophie Stewart.

== Bibliography ==
- Carlson, Marvin. Deathtraps: The Postmodern Comedy Thriller. Indiana University Press, 1993.
- Wearing, J.P. The London Stage 1950–1959: A Calendar of Productions, Performers, and Personnel. Rowman & Littlefield, 2014.
