= I'm alright, Jack =

British expression

"I'm all right, Jack" is a British expression used to describe people who act only in their own best interests, even if providing assistance to others would take minimal to no effort on their part. It carries a negative connotation and is rarely used to describe the person saying it.

The phrase is believed to have originated among Royal Navy sailors: when a ladder was slung over the side of a ship, the last sailor to climb on board would say, "I'm all right Jack; pull up the ladder." The latter half of the phrase, typically used as "pulling up the ladder behind oneself", has been used to call out unfairness and hypocrisy on the part of those who are seen to have benefited from opportunities handed out to them, only to deny such opportunities to others. Latterly, this has become associated with describing the general behaviour of the baby boomer generation.

The expression was used in the title of the 1959 comedy film I'm All Right Jack. It appears in the lyrics of the 1973 Pink Floyd song "Money", the 1984 U2 song "Wire" from The Unforgettable Fire, the 1978 Tom Robinson Band song of the same name, and is also the name of a 2019 song by UB40 which satirises people who do not care about the less fortunate.

== See also ==
- Just-world fallacy
