= Mario Fabrizi =

British actor and comedian (1924–1963)

- Born: Mario Edgio Pantaleone Fabrizi; 25 June 1924; Holborn, London, England
- Died: 5 April 1963 (aged 38–39); Neasden, London, England
- Occupation: Actor
- Years active: 1956–1963
- Spouse: Katherine Boyne (m. 1960)
- Children: 1

Mario Edgio Pantaleone Fabrizi (25 June 1924 – 5 April 1963) was an English comedian and actor of Italian descent, noted for his luxuriant moustache. He was active in Britain in the 1950s and early 1960s.

== Life ==
Fabrizi was born to Italian parents in Holborn, London, England, in 1924, his mother's maiden name being Pisani. His father was a Vicomte (Italian: visconte), a title that Mario inherited on his father's death in 1959. He married Katherine Boyne of Leeds on 28 May 1960. They had a son, Anthony, in 1961.

On 5 April 1963 Fabrizi died of a stress-related illness at his home in Neasden, London; his wife and son survived him. A week before his death, he had announced that he was leaving show business to become an advertising executive because he had not had a job in four months.

His son Anthony is now a businessman based in the City of London.

== Career ==
On ITV, Fabrizi was well known for his role in Granada Television's popular series The Army Game, as Corporal "Moosh" Merryweather, while on BBC television, he was a regular member of the ensemble cast of the Tony Hancock sitcom Hancock's Half Hour. His most notable film role was as Neville Shanks, the photographer, in Hancock's 1963 film, The Punch and Judy Man. He also worked frequently with Peter Sellers and Spike Milligan.

He was buried in St. Mary's Catholic Cemetery, Harrow Road, Kensal Green, London, W.10.

== Selected filmography ==
- The Smallest Show on Earth (1957) – Actor in 'The Mystery of Hell Valley' (uncredited)
- The Naked Truth (1957) – Man in Autograph Crowd (uncredited)
- Carlton-Browne of the F.O. (1959) – Deputy Minister (uncredited)
- The Running Jumping & Standing Still Film (1960) – (uncredited)
- Two-Way Stretch (1960) – Jones
- The Rebel (1961) – Coffee Bar attendant
- Postman's Knock (1962) – Villager
- Operation Snatch (1962) – Tall Man
- Village of Daughters (1962) – Antonio Durigo
- It's Trad, Dad! (1962) – Spaghetti Eater
- Carry On Cruising (1962) – Second Cook
- On the Beat (1962) – Newspaper Seller
- Just for Fun (1963) – Diner
- The Wrong Arm of the Law (1963) – Van Driver (uncredited)
- The Punch and Judy Man (1963) – Nevil Shanks
- The Mouse on the Moon (1963) – Mario – the Valet
- The Pink Panther (1963) – Hotel Manager (uncredited) (final film role)
