= Power Without Glory (play) =

1947 play

- Broadway programme
- Written by: Michael Clayton Hutton
- Original language: English
- Genre: Crime drama
- Setting: London, present day

Premiere
- Date premiered: 25 February 1947
- Place premiered: New Lindsey Theatre, Notting Hill

Power Without Glory is a 1947 crime play by the British writer Michael Clayton Hutton. It first appeared at the New Lindsey Theatre in Notting Hill before transferring to the Fortune Theatre in London's West End where it ran for 73 performances between 5 April and 7 June 1947. The West End cast included Dirk Bogarde, Kenneth More, Maureen Pryor, Beatrice Varley and Dandy Nichols. It was filmed by the BBC the same year with the original cast. His appearance in the play brought Bogarde to the attention of filmmakers. Both he and More would go on to become stars of the Rank Organisation. It was staged at the Booth Theatre on Broadway in early 1948 with a different cast, lasting for 31 performances.

== Synopsis ==
In the East End Cliff, the younger son of a shopkeeper, murders his pregnant girlfriend. His family members attempt to shield him from the law for varying reasons.

== Bibliography ==
- Hesse, Beatrix. The English Crime Play in the Twentieth Century. Springer, 2015.
- Hinxman, Margaret & D'Arcy, Susan. The Films of Dirk Bogarde. Literary Services and Production, 1974.
- Wearing, J. P. The London Stage 1940–1949: A Calendar of Productions, Performers, and Personnel. Rowman & Littlefield, 2014.
