= Lionel Jeffries =

English actor, screenwriter and film director (1926–2010)

- Born: Lionel Charles Jeffries; 10 June 1926; Forest Hill, London, England
- Died: 19 February 2010 (aged 83); Poole, Dorset, England
- Education: Royal Academy of Dramatic Art
- Occupations: Actor; director; screenwriter
- Years active: 1950–2001
- Spouse: Eileen Mary Walsh (m. 1951)
- Children: 3, including Ty Jeffries
- Relatives: Amy Mason (granddaughter) Charles Jeffries (grandfather) William Walsh (educationist) (brother-in-law)

Lionel Charles Jeffries (10 June 1926 – 19 February 2010) was an English actor, director, and screenwriter. He appeared primarily in films and was nominated for a Golden Globe Award for his role in The Spy with a Cold Nose.

== Early life ==
Jeffries was born in Forest Hill, South London. Both his parents were social workers with the Salvation Army. As a boy, he attended the Queen Elizabeth Grammar School in Wimborne Minster in Dorset.

In 1945, he received a commission in the Oxford and Buckinghamshire Light Infantry and served in Burma at the Rangoon radio station during the Second World War, being awarded the Burma Star. (He blamed the humidity there for his hair loss at the age of 19.) He also served as a Captain in the Royal West African Frontier Force.

== Career ==
He trained at the Royal Academy of Dramatic Art. He entered repertory at the David Garrick Theatre, Lichfield, Staffordshire for two years and appeared in early British television plays. Jeffries built a successful career in British films mainly in comic character roles and as he was prematurely bald he often played characters older than himself, such as the role of father to Caractacus Potts (played by Dick Van Dyke) in the film Chitty Chitty Bang Bang (1968), although Jeffries was actually six months younger than Van Dyke, who was born on 13 December 1925.

His acting career reached a peak in the 1960s with leading roles in other films like Two-Way Stretch (1960), The Trials of Oscar Wilde (1960), Murder Ahoy! (opposite Margaret Rutherford), First Men in the Moon (1964) and Camelot (1967).

Jeffries turned to writing and directing children's films, including a well-regarded version of The Railway Children (1970) and The Amazing Mr. Blunden (1972). He was a member of the British Catholic Stage Guild. The Railway Children was very successful but Jeffries's later efforts were less so including Wombling Free.

Jeffries had a negative attitude towards television and avoided the medium for many years. He reluctantly appeared on television in an acting role in the 1980 London Weekend Television Dennis Potter drama Cream in My Coffee and realised that television production values were now little different from those in the film industry; as a result he developed a belated career in television. He appeared in an episode of the Thames Television/ITV comedy drama Minder in 1984 as Cecil Caine, an eccentric widower, and in an episode of Inspector Morse in 1990 (Central Television/Zenith/ITV).

He starred as Tom (Thomas Maddisson) in the Thames/ITV situation comedy Tom, Dick and Harriet with Ian Ogilvy and Brigit Forsyth. During location filming with Ogilvy for a 1983 episode, a stunt involving a car and a lake went very badly wrong, ending up with Jeffries only just managing to get out of the car's front window before the vehicle sank in 45 feet (14 m) of water.

== Retirement and death ==
Jeffries began to suffer from vascular dementia in 1998 and retired from acting in 2001. His health declined in the following years. He died on 19 February 2010, at a nursing home in Poole, Dorset. He was 83.

The 2010 BBC TV drama The First Men in the Moon carries the dedication: "For Lionel Jeffries 1926–2010."

== Personal life ==
Jeffries was married to Eileen Mary Walsh from 1951 until his death. They had a son and two daughters. His son Ty Jeffries is a composer, lyricist and cabaret artist. His granddaughter Amy Mason is a novelist and playwright.

== Filmography ==
Year	Title	Director	Writer
1970	The Railway Children	Yes	Yes
1972	The Amazing Mr. Blunden	Yes	Yes
1973	Baxter!	Yes	No
1977	Wombling Free	Yes	Yes
1978	The Water Babies	Yes	Additional
1979	Nelson's Touch (short)	No	Yes

Acting roles

- Stage Fright (1950) – Bald RADA Student (uncredited)
- Will Any Gentleman...? (1953) – Mr. Frobisher
- The Black Rider (1954) – Martin Bremner
- The Colditz Story (1955) – Harry Tyler
- The Quatermass Xperiment (1955) – Blake
- No Smoking (1955) – George Pogson
- All for Mary (1955) – Maitre D', Hotel
- Windfall (1955) – Arthur Lee
- Jumping for Joy (1956) – Bert Benton
- Bhowani Junction (1956) – Captain McDaniel
- The Baby and the Battleship (1956) – George
- Eyewitness (1956) – Man in Pub
- Lust for Life (1956) – Dr. Peyron
- High Terrace (1956) – Monkton
- Up in the World (1957) – Wilson
- The Man in the Sky (1957) – Keith
- Doctor at Large (1957) – Dr. Hatchet
- Hour of Decision (1957) – Elvin Main
- The Vicious Circle (1957) – Geoffrey Windsor
- Barnacle Bill (1957) – Garrod
- Blue Murder at St Trinian's (1957) – Joe Mangan
- Dunkirk (1958) – Colonel – Medical Officer
- Charles and Mary (1958, TV Movie) – George Dyer
- Up the Creek (1958) – Steady Barker
- The Revenge of Frankenstein (1958) – Fritz
- Law and Disorder (1958) – Major Proudfoot
- Orders to Kill (1958) – Interrogator
- Girls at Sea (1958) – Harry, the Tourist
- Behind the Mask (1958) – Walter Froy
- Further Up the Creek (1958) – Steady Barker
- Nowhere to Go (1958) – Pet Shop Clerk (uncredited)
- Idol on Parade (1959) – Bertie
- The Nun's Story (1959) – Dr. Goovaerts
- Bobbikins (1959) – Gregory Mason
- Please Turn Over (1959) – Ian Howard
- Two-Way Stretch (1960) – Chief P.O. Crout
- Jazz Boat (1960) – Sergeant Thompson
- Life Is a Circus (1960) – Genie
- Let's Get Married (1960) – Marsh
- The Trials of Oscar Wilde (1960) – John Sholto Douglas, Marquis of Queensberry
- Tarzan the Magnificent (1960) – Ames
- Fanny (1961) – Monsieur Brun (The Englishman)
- The Hellions (1961) – Luke Billings
- Operation Snatch (1962) – Evans
- Mrs. Gibbon's Boys (1962) – Lester Gibbons
- The Notorious Landlady (1962) – Inspector Oliphant
- Kill or Cure (1962) – Det. Insp. Hook
- The Wrong Arm of the Law (1963) – Inspector Fred 'Nosey' Parker
- Call me Bwana (1963) – Ezra
- The Scarlet Blade (1963) – Col. Judd
- The Long Ships (1964) – Aziz
- First Men in the Moon (1964) – Cavor / Joseph Cavor
- Murder Ahoy! (1964) – Captain Sydney De Courcy Rhumstone
- The Truth About Spring (1965) – 'Cark' / Cark
- You Must Be Joking! (1965) – Sgt. Maj. McGregor
- The Secret of My Success (1965) – Insp. Hobart / Baron von Lukenberg / The Earl of Aldershot / President Esteda
- The Spy with a Cold Nose (1966) – Stanley Farquhar
- Drop Dead Darling (1966) – Parker
- Oh Dad, Poor Dad, Mamma's Hung You in the Closet and I'm Feelin' So Sad (1967) – Airport Commander
- Camelot (1967) – King Pellinore
- Jules Verne's Rocket to the Moon (1967) – Sir Charles Dillworthy
- Chitty Chitty Bang Bang (1968) – Grandpa Potts
- 12 + 1 (1969) – Randomhouse
- Twinky (1970) – Solicitor
- Eyewitness (1970) – Grandpa
- The Railway Children (1970) – Malcolm (uncredited)
- Whoever Slew Auntie Roo? (1972) – Inspector Ralph Willoughby
- Royal Flash (1975) – Kraftstein
- What Changed Charley Farthing? (1976) – Houlihan
- Wombling Free (1978) – Womble (voice)
- The Prisoner of Zenda (1979) – General Sapt
- Cream in My Coffee (1980, TV Movie) – Bernard Wilsher
- Father Charlie (1982, TV Series) - Father Charlie
- Better Late Than Never (1983) – Bertie Hargreaves
- Minder (1984, TV Series) Senior Citizen Caine - Cecil Caine
- Abel's Island (1988 short) – Gower (voice)
- Danny, the Champion of the World (1989, TV Movie) – Mr. Snoddy
- A Chorus of Disapproval (1989) – Jarvis Huntley-Pike
- First and Last (1989, TV Movie) – Laurence
- Ending Up (1989, TV Movie) – Shorty
- Inspector Morse. The Sins of the Fathers (1990, TV Series) - Charles Radford
- Jekyll & Hyde (1990, TV Movie) – Jekyll's Father
- Heaven on Earth (1998, TV Movie) – Isaac Muller
