= You Must Be Joking! (1965 film) =

1965 British film by Michael Winner

- Theatrical release poster
- Directed by: Michael Winner
- Screenplay by: Alan Hackney; Jan Read from a story by Michael Winner
- Produced by: Charles H. Schneer
- Starring: Michael Callan; Lionel Jeffries; Denholm Elliott
- Cinematography: Geoffrey Unsworth
- Edited by: Bernard Gribble
- Music by: Laurie Johnson
- Production company: Ameran
- Distributed by: Columbia Pictures Corporation (UK)
- Release date: 3 August 1965 (London)
- Running time: 100 minutes
- Country: United Kingdom
- Language: English

You Must Be Joking! is a 1965 black and white British comedy film directed by Michael Winner and starring Michael Callan, Lionel Jeffries, and Denholm Elliott. It was written by Alan Hackney, from a story by Winner.

The format of the film, four people each doing six tasks linked to a scavenger hunt, allows for 24 otherwise somewhat unconnected comedy vignettes, which jointly create the story line. The items (purportedly representing British identity) include flying ducks for the wall, an English rose, the Spirit of Ecstasy from a Rolls-Royce car, an electric hare from a greyhound race and the Lutine Bell.

== Plot ==
Major Foskett, a British Army psychologist, assembles five military men for a testing task: Sergeant Major McGregor (complete with kilt and bearskin), Captain Tabasco, Sergeant Clegg (a father of nine), Staff Sergeant Mansfield and United States Air Force Lieutenant Morton. They have their initiative tested in a scavenger hunt.

Their first task is to escape a maze. Tabasco orders up a helicopter to take him out and two others take a ride, but Clegg is left in the maze.

They are instructed to obtain six items, supposedly symbols of the British way of life. The reward for the winner is to be fast-tracked for promotion and a ten-day, all-expenses-paid trip around the world for two. Among the feats to be accomplished within 48 hours are escaping from the maze, retrieving a rare rose and the mascot from a Rolls-Royce motorcar, and procurement of a lock of hair and an autograph from a popular French singer. The final challenge involves the famous Lutine bell from the Underwriting Room of Lloyd's of London. MacGregor arrives at the finish line by parachute, Tabasco comes in an ambulance, Clegg digs his way in from below. Morton arrives last (by car), but is declared the winner and resigns.

General Lockwood is arrested for misuse of the requisition system. Foskett is arrested for conspiracy to steal the Lutine Bell.

== Cast ==
- Michael Callan as Lieutenant Tim Morton
- Lionel Jeffries as Sergeant Major Sidney McGregor
- Denholm Elliott as Captain Fitzroy Tabasco
- Wilfrid Hyde White as General Lockwood
- Bernard Cribbins as Sergeant Clegg
- James Robertson Justice as librarian
- Leslie Phillips as Ted Walters [irate husband]
- Gabriella Licudi as Annabelle
- Patricia Viterbo as Sylvie Tarnet
- Terry-Thomas as Major Foskett
- Lee Montague as Staff Sergeant Sidney Mansfield
- Irene Handl as neighbour
- Richard Wattis as Parkins, club receptionist
- Miles Malleson as Rolls-Royce salesman
- Gwendolyn Watts as Mrs Walters [flirtatious wife]
- Clive Dunn as TV station doorman
- Tracy Reed as Poppy Pennington
- James Villiers as Bill Simpson
- Graham Stark as Harry Purkiss
- Arthur Lowe as husband back from holidays
- Peter Bull as man in library
- Norman Vaughan as Norman Stone
- David Jacobs as disc jockey (uncredited)
- Ronald Howard as Cecil, Lockwood's aide (uncredited)
- Stanley Meadows as Barry Morris (uncredited)
- Jon Pertwee as electric hare counterman (uncredited)
- Lance Percival as man at greyhound track (uncredited)
- Marianne Stone as fan club worker (uncredited)
- Peter Barkworth as Peter, studio director (uncredited)
- Jill Mai Meredith as Sally (uncredited)
- Alexandra Stevenson as Carol (uncredited)
- Joan Benham as wife back from holidays
- Jeffrey Chandler as Freddy (uncredited)
- Ed Bishop as soldier at checkpoint (uncredited)
- Peter Gilmore as soldier in greenhouse (uncredited)

== Production ==
The film was based on an original story by Michael Winner which was inspired by a real army initiative test where soldiers were asked to get as far away as possible from their camp at Catterick. He hired Alan Hackney, who had written several Boulting Brothers screenplays, to write the script.

While looking for finance, Winner was approached to make a film with the Dave Clark Five, but Winner did not like the idea. Charles H. Schneer liked the Hackney script and agreed to make it under a deal he had with Columbia and Winner says he suggested John Boorman take over the Dave Clark movie. Winner said Columbia insisted that Michael Callan play a lead role. Winner called the actor "a nice fellow who didn't sell the film in America and didn't help it in England either."

Winner hired a cameraman who felt they could not film in the locations that had been chosen, so Winner replaced him with Geoff Unsworth.

Johnny Speight did some uncredited writing on the film.

== Critical reception ==
Winner says the film received good reviews but was not popular at the box office.

The Monthly Film Bulletin wrote: "In spite of the enormous odds against it, all the old jokes come off again quite well. Highlights are Terry-Thomas, blowing a hunting horn as he pursues escaped contestants with a view to throwing them back into the maze, and becoming hopelessly entangled with a real fox hunt; and Michael Callan madly parodying a television dance routine. Also the new waviness, now bringing its share of frozen shots and speeded-up photography to even as unlikely a subject as this, can be said to enliven the look of things somewhat."

TV Guide called the film: "Lunacy and laughs galore, with director Winner's gimmicky style much in evidence."

Hal Erickson wrote in The New York Times: "Director Michael Winner was still in his 'mad mod' period when he lensed the wacky goings-on of You Must be Joking? His Death Wish pictures of the 1970s were in 1965 as remote as another galaxy."
