= Private's Progress =

1956 British film by John Boulting

- Original UK cinema poster
- Directed by: John Boulting
- Screenplay by: John Boulting; Frank Harvey
- Based on: Private's Progress by Alan Hackney
- Produced by: Roy Boulting
- Starring: Ian Carmichael; Richard Attenborough; Dennis Price; Terry-Thomas
- Cinematography: Eric Cross
- Edited by: Anthony Harvey
- Music by: John Addison
- Production company: Charter Film Productions
- Distributed by: British Lion Films (UK)
- Release date: 17 February 1956 (UK)
- Running time: 95 minutes
- Country: United Kingdom
- Language: English
- Budget: £161,069
- Box office: £310,870 (UK)

Private's Progress is a 1956 British comedy film directed by John Boulting and starring Richard Attenborough, Dennis Price, Terry-Thomas and Ian Carmichael. The script was by John Boulting and Frank Harvey, based on the novel of the same name by Alan Hackney.

== Plot ==
During the Second World War, young undergraduate Stanley Windrush is conscripted into the British Army. Unlike his friend, Egan, Windrush is a most reluctant soldier and struggles through basic training at Gravestone Barracks under Sgt. Sutton. Failing his officer selection board, he is posted to a holding unit, under the command of Major Hitchcock. Most of the soldiers there are malingerers and drop-outs, with one of them Private Cox becoming his mentor in escaping work details and riding on the railway without a ticket.

Windrush is finally posted to train as a Japanese interpreter, where he becomes the prize pupil. He is then contacted by his uncle, Brigadier Tracepurcel, who rapidly rose from the rank of Major for facilitating profitable business deals for his superior officers and is now a senior officer in the War Office, to join a secret operation known only as Hatrack. He is quickly commissioned and the operation is launched, Windrush becoming an unwitting participant in a scheme ostensibly to recover looted artworks from the Germans but really to steal them and sell them to two crooked art dealers. All are astounded that Windrush was trained in Japanese, rather than German that initially made him desirable to the operation.

Windrush survives the operation where he is captured by British forces whilst in German uniform. No one believes he is British until he comes across Major Hitchcock who is commanding the prisoner of war camp Windrush is at. After being hospitalised for alleged mental illness, he is discharged from the army. Tracepurcel and his associate, Private Cox, fake their deaths. Windrush returns to university after the war and is surprised to receive a visit from Cox, who brings him an attaché case. Cox is arrested as he leaves by Sergeant Sutton, now a Royal Military Policeman; Windrush and Tracepurcel having been tracked as the source of a counterfeit copy of one of the artworks. Windrush innocently reveals to the military police the contents of the case – a large sum of money – and is also arrested, assumed to be complicit in the fraud.

The closing epilogue and dedication states: "To all those who got away with it, this film is most respectfully dedicated."

== Cast ==
- Richard Attenborough as Private Cox
- Dennis Price as Brig. Bertram Tracepurcel
- Terry-Thomas as Major Hitchcock
- Ian Carmichael as Pte. Stanley Windrush
- Peter Jones as Arthur Egan
- William Hartnell as Sgt. Sutton
- Thorley Walters as Captain Bootle
- Jill Adams as Prudence Greenslade
- Ian Bannen as Private Horrocks
- Victor Maddern as Private George Blake
- Kenneth Griffith as Private Dai Jones
- John Warren as Sgt./Maj. Gradwick
- George Coulouris as padre
- Derrick De Marney as Pat
- Ronald Adam as doctor at medical
- Henry Longhurst as Mr. Spottiswood
- Miles Malleson as Mr. Windrush Sr.
- Sally Miles as Catherine
- David King-Wood as Gerald
- Brian Oulton as M.O. at Gravestone Camp
- Michael Trubshawe as Col. Fanshawe
- John Le Mesurier as psychiatrist
- Robert Raglan as General Tomlinson
- Nicholas Bruce as German officer
- Theodore Zichy as German agent
- Henry Oscar as art expert
- Basil Dignam as Colonel Martin (president of Selection Board) (uncredited)
- John Harvey as RAF officer at headquarters (uncredited)
- Glyn Houston as corporal on sick call (uncredited)
- Lloyd Lamble as officer at medical hearing (uncredited)
- Christopher Lee as General von Linbeck's aide (uncredited)
- David Lodge as lance corporal on guard duty (uncredited)
- Trevor Reid as adjutant (uncredited)
- Marianne Stone as expectant mother talking to Captain Bootle (uncredited)
- Michael Ward as Sidney (guest at party) (uncredited)
- Peter Williams as officer at Selection Board (uncredited)

== Production ==
The film was primarily filmed at Shepperton Studios but some scenes were filmed at Wantage Hall, a hall of residence for the University of Reading.

The War Office refused all requests for cooperation, even after the ending of the film was changed to show the guilty being caught. The producers inserted a title card depicting three officers in the See no evil, hear no evil, speak no evil stance with the words "the producers gratefully acknowledge the official cooperation of absolutely nobody".

It was the first in a series of successful satirical comedies made by the Boulting brothers. Their 1959 comedy I'm All Right Jack featured many of the same actors and characters. Many references are made to the events of Private's Progress.

== Reception ==
=== Box office ===
The film was the second most popular at the British box office in 1956.

=== Critical reception ===
The Monthly Film Bulletin wrote:

The general irreverence of this film is in itself welcome; it is prepared to tilt at almost any target – the boredom and futility of army routine, the corruption of high-ups at the War Office, class-consciousness, all kinds of incompetence, intrigue and official absurdity. All that one wishes is for the humour to have more edge. There is material here for real satire, but writing and direction choose the less demanding level of affable farce. The experiences of Windrush are not related to anything outside himself; and since the reality of war is never shown at all, an important point of contrast is lost, and the force of the episode about the looting of German art treasures is dissipated. Everything in this world is absurd. Also, Ian Carmichael – though he has an enjoyably accomplished comedy technique – does not present Windrush as a true innocent; he is too sly, too knowing. When one thinks of Chaplin in Shoulder Arms [1918] one realises how much is lost by too obvious a dig in the ribs. For the rest, there are some clever character sketches by TerryThomas, Richard Attenborough and Kenneth Griffith, and a number of good jokes.

Variety wrote: "As a lighthearted satire on British army life during the last war, Private's Progress has moments of sheer joy based on real authenticity. But it is not content to rest on satire alone and introduces an unreal melodramatic adventure which robs the story of much of its charm. ... Expert British players take good care of the supporting parts."

The New York Times wrote, "the Boultings have come up with an ingenious story and injected hilarious moments. But the whole thing sparkles and fizzles."
