= The Wrong Arm of the Law =

1963 British film by Cliff Owen

- Theatrical release poster
- Directed by: Cliff Owen
- Written by: John Antrobus; Ray Galton; Alan Simpson; John Warren; Len Heath
- Produced by: E.M. Smedley Aston; Aubrey Baring
- Starring: Peter Sellers; Lionel Jeffries; Bernard Cribbins; John Le Mesurier; Bill Kerr
- Cinematography: Ernest Steward
- Edited by: Tristam Cones
- Music by: Richard Rodney Bennett
- Production company: Romulus Films
- Distributed by: British Lion Films (UK)
- Release date: 14 March 1963 (UK)
- Running time: 94 minutes
- Country: United Kingdom
- Language: English
- Budget: £233,570

The Wrong Arm of the Law is a 1963 British comedy film directed by Cliff Owen and starring Peter Sellers, Bernard Cribbins, Lionel Jeffries, John Le Mesurier, Bill Kerr and Nanette Newman. The final screenplay was written by John Antrobus, Ray Galton, and Alan Simpson – from an original draft script by John Warren and Len Heath, based on a story by Ivor Jay and William Whistance Smith – and made by Romulus Films. It reunited Sellers, Jeffries, and Cribbins who appeared together in the 1960 film comedy Two-Way Stretch – also written by John Warren and Len Heath – where similarly Sellers and Cribbins played crooks (incarcerated) against Jeffries as an officer of the law, in that case as their chief prison officer.

== Plot ==
In London, a gang of three Australian criminals impersonate policemen to carry out robberies by stealing stolen cash and jewels from the crooks who had taken it. Local gang leader "Pearly" Gates – who operates with the front of an effete French couturier called Charles Jules in a London fashion house, Maison Jules – finds his criminal takings are being cut severely. Pearly does not realise his girlfriend and model, Valerie, is secretly in league with the Australians, feeding them details of the crimes being arranged by Pearly and his associates.

The criminal underworld of London have recently set up a syndicate, a closed shop arrangement to divide up the areas and protect each other's interests. Initially, Pearly accuses rival crook "Nervous" O'Toole of a breakdown in their agreement. However, when it emerges that they are both being scammed by the same interloping gang they join forces, along with the police, using Inspector Fred "Nosy" Parker as their liaison, to flush the so-called "I.P.O. Mob" (Impersonating a Police Officer) out of the shadows to be arrested.

After the London criminal underworld calls a 24-hour no-crime truce to allow for a full search, the IPO Mob slip through Parker's fingers. Parker then suggests a large crime to the Scotland Yard assistant commissioner in order to bring the I.P.O. Mob to justice. To ensure the safety of the cash stolen, the assistant commissioner insists that Parker join Pearly's gang. However, after the bullion robbery, Pearly is unwilling to forego the proceeds.

== Cast ==
- Peter Sellers as "Pearly" Gates, chairman of the London criminal underworld syndicate and couturier Charles Jules
- Bernard Cribbins as "Nervous" O'Toole, vice-chairman of the London criminal underworld syndicate
- Lionel Jeffries as Inspector Fred "Nosy" Parker
- Nanette Newman as Valerie, Maison Jules model and girlfriend of Pearly
- Bill Kerr as Jack Coombes, the sergeant of the IPO Mob
- Ed Devereaux as "Bluey" May, IPO Mob accomplice with Coombes
- Reg Lye as Reg Denton, IPO Mob accomplice with Coombes
- Davy Kaye as Trainer King, criminal associate of Pearly
- Graham Stark as Sid Cooper, criminal associate of Pearly
- John Le Mesurier as Scotland Yard Assistant Commissioner
- Martin Boddey as Superintendent J.S. Forest
- Irene Browne as Dowager, customer of Maison Jules
- Arthur Mullard as "Brassknuckles", criminal associate of Nervous
- Dermot Kelly as "Misery" Martin, criminal associate of Nervous
- Vanda Godsell as Annette, associate of Pearly, administering Maison Jules
- Tutte Lemkow as "Siggy" Schmoltz, hired hand from Hamburg for the bullion robbery
- Barry Keegan as Mr Pointer
- Dennis Price as Educated Ernest, confidence trickster delegate at the underworld syndicate's meeting (uncredited)
- Marianne Stone as woman delegate at the underworld syndicate's meeting (uncredited)
- Dick Emery as adulterous man in flat 307, Haven Green Court (uncredited)
- John Junkin as Maurice (uncredited)
- Cardew Robinson as postman (uncredited)
- Mario Fabrizi as van driver and seller of women's dresses (uncredited)
- John Harvey as police station Sergeant (uncredited)
- Harold Siddons as PC in basement garage (uncredited)
- Jack Silk as police station PC (uncredited)
- Derek Guyler as PC at Scotland Yard (uncredited)
- Gerald Sim as airfield official (uncredited)
- Michael Caine as an extra at Battersea Park funfair (uncredited)

== Production ==
The film was made at Beaconsfield Studios and many of the robbery scenes were filmed around Beaconsfield in Buckinghamshire and the Uxbridge area of what was then Middlesex. Filming locations include the early Post Office robbery at Burkes Parade/Post Office Lane Beaconsfield, the gang meeting at Havens Court, Ealing, the Bullion Transport robbery at Cowley Mill Road/Waterloo Road Uxbridge combined with Bushy Park Road Teddington, and the escape flight from Denham Aerodrome.

Peter Sellers loved the 1961 Aston Martin DB4 GT used in the high-speed getaway so much that he bought the car after shooting the film, contingent on the engine being replaced with a 4.0-litre Lagonda Rapide.

== Release ==
The film opened at the Warner Theatre in London's West End on 14 March 1963.

== Reception ==
=== Box office ===
It was one of the 12 most popular films at the British box office in 1963.

=== Critical reception ===
The Monthly Film Bulletin wrote: "Cliff Owen's considerable competence shows in the way he takes good and bad jokes equably in his stride, cutting sharply as soon as a comedy point has been made, getting pretty well every ounce of value out of his script. ... Lionel Jeffries, desperately eager and despairingly confused in the pursuit of crime, John Le Mesurier, a Scotland Yard official lightly disguised as an ice-cream salesman but clinging to the dignity of his Whitehall hat, Peter Sellers, training his gang by way of home movies and pampering them with holidays on the Costa Brava, are at their accomplished best."

Variety wrote: "A slightweight cops and robbers idea has been pepped up into a briskly amusing farce thanks to a combo of deft direction, thesping and writing. ... Cliff Owen has directed with verve. Locations and all technical credits help to give polish to a breezy, likeable comedy."

In The New York Times, Bosley Crowther wrote: "It is strictly lightweight clowning, longer on plot than on wit and wholly dependent on the archness of Mr. Sellers to give it a cachet. Others in the cast are amusing, especially Mr. Jeffries as the cop, but the enterprise stands by the stiffening of Mr. Sellers's cunning roguishness."

The Radio Times Guide to Films gave the film 4/5 stars, writing: "Peter Sellers is at his funniest as a cockney criminal mastermind who uses a West End dress salon as a front for the illegal activities of his inept gang. He's up against inspector Lionel Jeffries, whose bungling would give the future Inspector Clouseau a run for his money. Cliff Owen directs the marvellously inventive script with due care as Scotland Yard and Sellers decide to co-operate to apprehend a bunch of Australian crooks posing as policemen."
