= Jumping for Joy =

1956 film by John Paddy Carstairs

- Original campaign book
- Directed by: John Paddy Carstairs
- Written by: Henry Blyth; Jack Davies
- Produced by: Raymond Stross
- Starring: Frankie Howerd; Stanley Holloway; Joan Hickson; Lionel Jeffries
- Cinematography: Jack E. Cox
- Edited by: John D. Guthridge
- Music by: Larry Adler
- Distributed by: The Rank Organisation
- Release date: 21 February 1956
- Running time: 91 minutes
- Country: United Kingdom
- Language: English

Jumping for Joy is a 1956 British comedy film directed by John Paddy Carstairs and starring Frankie Howerd, Stanley Holloway, Joan Hickson and Lionel Jeffries. It was written by Henry Blyth and Jack Davies. It tells of the comic adventures of an ex-worker at a greyhound racing track.

== Plot ==
Willie Joy works at a greyhound track as a cleaner, which involves picking up droppings from the dog track between races. He is tricked into standing in the line of the lure and falls on it as it speeds past with the dogs chasing it. He is fired.

Breeder Bert Benton has a sick dog and sells it to Joy who takes it home. His landlady evicts him. He meets con-man "Captain" Jack Montague and together they hatch a plan to make money from the dog, whom they name "Lindy Lou". Nursed back to health, Lindy starts to prove herself at racing trials. Benton wants to buy her back.

Crooks use Joy as an unwitting collaborator in fixing races and placing large bets. They pass doped meat for the dog but Joy and Montague eat it themselves. The crooks find them asleep but cannot find the dog. They detach Montague's railway carriage home and move it onto an active railway line. When they awake they are told they are near Doncaster. The dog is rescued just before the carriage is hit by a train.

Lindy Lou wins the Gold Cup but only due to a distraction in crowd as Joy hits a policeman to ensue a whistle is blown. He is arrested and recognises the distinctive shoes of Haines of Scotland Yard as the ringleader of the crooks.

== Cast ==
- Frankie Howerd as Willie Joy
- Stanley Holloway as Captain Jack Montague
- A. E. Matthews as Lord Reginald Cranfield
- Tony Wright as Vincent
- Alfie Bass as Mr Blagg
- Joan Hickson as Lady Emily Cranfield
- Lionel Jeffries as Bert Benton
- Susan Beaumont as Susan Storer
- Terence Longdon as John Wyndham
- Colin Gordon as Max, the commentator
- Richard Wattis as Carruthers
- Danny Green as Plug Ugly
- Barbara Archer as Marlene
- William Kendall as Blenkinsop
- Ewen Solon as Haines
- Reginald Beckwith as Smithers
- Charles Hawtrey as man at bar (uncredited)
- Bill Fraser as drunk in snooker hall (uncredited)
- George A. Cooper as farmer (uncredited)
- Andrew Faulds as friend of drunk man (uncredited)
- Richard Dunn as policeman (uncredited)
- Joyce Gardner as the billiards room hustler (uncredited)
- Beatrice Varley as Joy's landlady (uncredited)
- John Warren as main commentator (uncredited)
- Tom Gill as second commentator (uncredited)

== Production ==
In June 1955 it was announced producer Raymond Stross had signed Frankie Howerd to a six picture contract, of which Jumping for Joy was to be the first. "I see Howerd as a young English Fernandel," said Stross. Howerd subsequently made A Touch of the Sun (1956) for Raymond Stross, although that was not made through the Rank Organisation.

The film was reported to have been specifically written for Howerd. However the film had been originally offered to Tony Hancock who turned it down (he had also turned down The Big Money.) It was one of several attempts by Rank to find a comedian to match the success of Norman Wisdom.

Filming took place at Pinewood in September 1955.

Lindy Lou was actually a racing greyhound called Moyshna Queen from Wandsworth Stadium.

Tony Wright's performance led to him being offered a contract at Rank. Another Rank contract player was Susan Beaumont.

Joyce Gardner was a well known professional billiards player at the time, not an actress.c

== Critical reception ==
In contemporary reviews Variety called the film a "hilarious dog racing comedy," adding: "Frankie Howerd, popular TV and vaude comic here, gets the maximum of laughs out of a dismissed trackboy role";

Monthly Film Bulletin said "An inoffensively obvious and naive comedy, Jumping for Joy is enlivened by a somewhat macabre running joke about a myopic old woman driver and assured and pleasant performances by Frankie Howerd and Stanley Holloway."

Kine Weekly said "The picture smoothly follows through with its basic gags and, oddly enough, the more they are repeated the livelier they become."

Evening Standard felt Howerd's "first film as star is as much a waste of his time as it is of yours."

Halliwell's Film and Video Guide 2000 describes the film as a "totally predictable star comedy which needs livening up"; the Time Out Film Guide 2009 describes the film as "lame".

TV Guide called the film a "Sporadically funny comedy".

The New York Times noted: "the delightful harmonica score in Jumping for Joy is provided by American expatriate Larry Adler".
