= Bobbikins =

1959 British film by Robert Day

- Directed by: Robert Day
- Written by: Oscar Brodney
- Produced by: Oscar Brodney; Bob McNaught
- Starring: Shirley Jones; Max Bygraves; Billie Whitelaw
- Cinematography: Geoffrey Faithfull
- Edited by: Stan Hawkes; Ralph Kemplen
- Music by: Philip Green
- Production company: 20th Century Fox
- Distributed by: 20th Century Fox
- Release date: 28 July 1959
- Running time: 89 minutes
- Country: United Kingdom
- Language: English

Bobbikins is a 1959 British comedy film directed by Robert Day and starring Shirley Jones and Max Bygraves. It was written by Oscar Brodney and made in CinemaScope and released by 20th Century Fox. It was produced by the British subsidiary of 20th Century Fox and shot at Elstree Studios.

== Plot ==
This adventure follows the story of a young navy man, his wife and their baby son, Bobby, also known as Bobbikins. To his surprise, Dad discovers his son talks, not baby-talk or gibberish but has adult conversations with his father only. Bobbikins learns stock market tips and passes them to his Dad.

After making a killing on the stock market, problems really begin. The dad is presumed mad, the government is after him, and the breakdown of relations between the young couple ensues. But there is hope.

== Cast ==
- Shirley Jones as Betty Barnaby
- Max Bygraves as Ben Barnaby
- Steven Stocker as Bobbikins Barnaby
- Billie Whitelaw as Lydia Simmons
- Barbara Shelley as Valerie
- Colin Gordon as Dr. Phillips
- Charles 'Bud' Tingwell as Luke Parker
- Lionel Jeffries as Gregory Mason
- Charles Carson as Sir Jason Crandall
- Rupert Davies as Jock Fleming
- Noel Hood as nurse
- David Lodge as Hargreave
- John Welsh as Admiral
- Bill Nagy as Rogers the butler

== Critical reception ==
The Monthly Film Bulletin wrote: "Though the film's gimmick of a talking baby is in itself capably handled, its development is feeble, and the film has little more than Max Bygraves' bright personality to rely on."

The Radio Times Guide to Films gave the film 1/5 stars, writing: "Even die-hard Max Bygraves fans will be hard pressed to squeeze much enjoyment out of this cinematic lemon. Impoverished entertainer Bygraves becomes rich after his 14-month-old baby begins picking up financial titbits from his park bench conversations with Chancellor Charles Carson. Preposterous."

In British Sound Films: The Studio Years 1928–1959 David Quinlan rated the film as "mediocre", writing: "Preposterous and over-sentimental comedy just about gets by on the charm of the baby and stars."

British film critic Leslie Halliwell said: "Not at all a good idea, and feebly executed."
