= The Happy Family (1952 film) =

- U.S. lobby card
- Directed by: Muriel Box
- Written by: Muriel Box; Sydney Box
- Based on: The Happy Family by Michael Clayton Hutton
- Produced by: Sydney Box; William MacQuitty
- Starring: Stanley Holloway; Kathleen Harrison; Naunton Wayne; Eileen Moore
- Cinematography: Reginald H. Wyer
- Edited by: Jean Barker
- Music by: Francis Chagrin
- Production company: London Independent Producers
- Distributed by: Apex Film Distributors; Souvaine Selective Pictures
- Release date: 31 March 1952
- Running time: 86 minutes
- Country: United Kingdom
- Language: English

The Happy Family (U.S. title: Mr. Lord Says No) is a 1952 British comedy film directed by Muriel Box and starring Stanley Holloway, Kathleen Harrison and Naunton Wayne. It was written by Box and Sydney Box adapted from the 1951 play The Happy Family by Michael Clayton Hutton. The plot of the film centres on resistance by a family to the disruption caused by the construction of the 1951 Festival of Britain.

== Plot ==
In 1951, the House of Lords is a grocery shop that sits on the South Bank of the river Thames close to the site of Festival Hall, which is noisily under construction. It is owned by the Lord family, a husband and wife with several children. Lillian Lord runs the shop, while Henry is a British Railways train driver who has worked on the railways for over 30 years and who is just about to retire. He is looking forward to enjoying a quiet retirement at the family shop, looking after his pet hare, Winston, though his spiritualist sister-in-law Ada has had supernatural visions of "men in black" bringing discord.

Their plans are disrupted by the arrival of Filch, a senior civil servant dressed in a black suit. He announces that he is overseeing work on the Festival of Britain, due to begin in just six weeks. He explains that, due to an error by one of the planners, the Lords' shop and house will have to be demolished to allow an entrance route to be built, assuring them that they will be financially compensated and will be moved to a new house in South Harrow. He expects this to settle the matter. However, the Lords are reluctant to leave their house, with Henry demanding £6 million if he is to move; an amount he calculates by Mr Filch's account of the estimate of the monetary value the Festival of Britain will bring. Filch goes away, hoping either to buy them off eventually or to forcibly evict them.

Filch has underestimated how attached they are to their property, which is a symbol of security and family to them after their years of hardship during the Great Depression and the Second World War, where they lost a son. In an attempt to halt their eviction, the Lords appeal to a series of politicians, including their councillor, mayor and MP. They are eventually sent to the official in charge of the work, who insists it must go ahead. They are served with eviction notices, and demolition is due to begin in a few days. However, they are undaunted, declaring that they would rather go to jail than South Harrow. When it becomes clear that their appeals from political channels are not working, the Lords turn to more active resistance at the urging of Cyril, their daughter's fiancé. They begin barricading their house and preparing to fight the government's attempts to turn them out. At the appointed hour, Filch demands they leave, but they refuse. They are joined by Maurice Hennessey, an ambitious BBC broadcaster hoping to use the case to further his career. He begins a running commentary on the events to the outside world.

Filch brings in a large number of police who attempt to storm the shop, but are driven off by missiles and flour bombs. After the assault descends into chaos, Filch launches a prolonged siege in the hope of starving them out. The Lords soon become a cause célèbre, with support coming in from across the world, putting further pressure on the civil servants who are desperate to get work completed before the Festival begins.

In spite of their popularity, the Lords' situation begins to grow desperate as they run out of food. Just as they are about to give in, Filch arrives and announces that, following the personal intervention of the Prime Minister, the architects have redrawn their plans and the road will now go either side of the shop, thereby saving it from demolition. The film ends with the family including Winston enjoying a day out at the Festival of Britain, with Ada flying into the clouds.

== Cast ==
- Stanley Holloway as Henry Lord
- Kathleen Harrison as Lillian Lord
- Naunton Wayne as Mr. Filch
- Dandy Nichols as Ada
- John Stratton as David
- Eileen Moore as Joan
- Shirley Mitchell as Marina
- Margaret Barton as Anne
- George Cole as Cyril
- Tom Gill as Maurice Hennessey
- Miles Malleson as Mr. Thwaites
- Geoffrey Sumner as Sir Charles Spanniell
- Laurence Naismith as councillor
- Edward Lexy as alderman
- Cameron Hall as mayor
- Hal Osmond as BR shop steward
- John Salew as Mr. Granite
- Ernest Butcher as neighbour
- Lyn Evans as neighbour
- Michael Ward as BBC announcer
- Richard Wattis as M.P.
- David Keir as process server
- Anthony Oliver as fireman
- Campbell Singer as policeman
- Peter Martyn as policeman
- Arthur Hambling as Granger
- Eileen Way as Mrs. Potter

== Production ==
The film was the first from a newly formed company London Independent. John Woolf promised £50,000 but withdrew it shortly before filming causing Lloyds Bank to step in.

== Critical reception ==
The Monthly Film Bulletin wrote: "A comedy adapted from the stage and constructed after the Passport to Pimlico model – defiant Cockney humour (Kathleen Harrison and Stanley Holloway) contrasted with tea and delaying actions in Whitehall (Naunton Wayne). The playing is strenuous, but an obvious, repetitive script and amateurish direction make it increasingly apparent that the material's comic possibilities have been much more satisfactorily realised before."

Kine Weekly wrote: "Jolly and human low-life comedy drama ... The film is not above borrowing ideas, but even so its 'an Englishman's home is his castle' theme is approached from a lively and witty slant. "

In The New York Times, Bosley Crowther called the film "minor whimsy... penned by that usually clever couple, Muriel and Sydney Box, and played by a cast of character actors who are among the best in the land...But the farce collapses painfully upon them long before the end, and what humor there is sounds so parochial that it belongs in earshot of Waterloo Road or, at most, beyond the range of the clumsily and tediously ridiculed BBC."

In The Radio Times Guide to Films Sue Heal gave the film 3/5 stars, writing: "One of those 'they don't make 'em like this any more' comic capers, ... It's an innocent, gentle lark, harking back to an infinitely preferable if somewhat mythically rosy era when officialdom was bumptious but owlishly benign, and the "great unwashed" behaved like a troupe of good-hearted medieval tumblers."
