= The Happy Family (play) =

1951 play

- Original language: English
- Written by: Michael Clayton Hutton
- Genre: Comedy
- Setting: London, present day

Premiere
- Date: 20 March 1951
- Place: Embassy Theatre, Hampstead

The Happy Family is a 1951 comedy play by the British writer Michael Clayton Hutton. It premiered at the Embassy Theatre in Hampstead. It then transferred to the Duchess Theatre in London's West End where it ran for 64 performances from 14 June 1951.

The West End cast included Henry Kendall, Thora Hird, Dandy Nichols, Digby Wolfe, Glyn Houston, Peter Copley and Tom Gill.

== Synopsis ==
When they found that their shop on the South Bank is required to be demolished in order to make way for the Festival of Britain the Lord family refuse to vacate the premises. After their protests to authorities fail they barricade themselves inside and prepare to defend it, gaining popular support in the process.

== Film adaptation ==
It was adapted into the 1952 film of the same title made by the independent producer Sydney Box, recently head of Gainsborough Pictures. Directed by Muriel Box it starred Stanley Holloway, Kathleen Harrison and Naunton Wayne. Nichols and Gill reprised their roles from the stage play.

== Bibliography ==
- Goble, Alan. The Complete Index to Literary Sources in Film. Walter de Gruyter, 1999.
- Spicer, Andrew. British Film Makers: Sydney Box. Manchester University Press, 2006.
- Wearing, J.P. The London Stage 1950–1959: A Calendar of Productions, Performers, and Personnel. Rowman & Littlefield, 2014.
