= Alan Hackney =

British writer (1924–2009)

Alan Charles Langley Hackney (10 September 1924, Manchester – 15 May 2009, Hertfordshire) was an English novelist and screenwriter.

== Biography ==
He was educated at Thornleigh Salesian College in Bolton, and later, while at Manchester University, was called up to the army. Hackney was posted to Maidstone Barracks for one year where he met his first wife and was later posted to India. After demobilisation he proceeded to New College, Oxford, where he read Politics, Philosophy and Economics under the tutelage of Isaiah Berlin.

He is best known for two of his novels, Private's Progress and Private Life, both of which were adapted into Boulting brothers films: the former as Private's Progress (1956); and the latter as I'm All Right Jack (1959). Hackney also co-wrote the script of I'm All Right Jack, which was a satire of trade unions. He was also a frequent contributor to Punch.

In the 1960s the British film industry went into decline, and Hackney's career was never to hit such heights again. A further two children meant that he had to travel to write and he had spells in Canada, Italy (with the RAI TV series K 2 +1, directed by Luciano Emmer, starring the Kessler Sisters and Johnny Dorelli), and Hollywood as well as working for British television and continuing to contribute to Punch.

In later years he worked with the composer Howard Blake on a musical version of I'm All Right Jack. His best-remembered films are Two-Way Stretch (1960), starring Peter Sellers, and You Must Be Joking (1965), directed by Michael Winner.

== Private life ==
His success writing for the television series The Adventures of Robin Hood and the 1960 film Sword of Sherwood Forest enabled him to buy an Edwardian house in Bovingdon, Hertfordshire where he spent the rest of his life, first with his wife, Peggy until she died in 1995 and then later with the Canadian film producer Daisy de Bellefeuille, whom he nursed through a long illness until her death in 2006.

== Awards ==
Hackney shared a BAFTA for Best Screenplay of 1959 for "I'm All Right Jack".

== Death ==
Alan Hackney died on 15 May 2009, aged 85.

He was survived by his six children.

== Novels ==
- Private's Progress (1954). [Later made into the 1956 film of that name.]
- All You Young Ladies (1956).
- Private Life (1958). [Later made into the 1959 film I'm All Right Jack.]
- Let's Keep Religion Out of This! (1963). [Simultaneously made into the 1963 film Heavens Above!.]
- Whatever Turns You On, Jack (1972).
