= Further Up the Creek =

1958 British film by Val Guest

Further up the Creek
- UK trade advertisement
- Directed by: Val Guest
- Written by: Val Guest; Len Heath; John Warren
- Produced by: Henry Halstead
- Starring: David Tomlinson; Frankie Howerd; Shirley Eaton
- Cinematography: Gerald Gibbs; Len Harris
- Edited by: Bill Lenny
- Music by: Stanley Black
- Production company: Hammer Film Productions
- Distributed by: Columbia
- Release date: 20 October 1958
- Running time: 91 minutes
- Country: UK
- Language: English

Further Up the Creek is a 1958 British comedy film written and directed by Val Guest and starring David Tomlinson, Frankie Howerd, Shirley Eaton, Thora Hird and Lionel Jeffries. It served as a follow-up to Up the Creek (1958), with Peter Sellers not reprising his role because it clashed with the filming of The Mouse That Roared (1959). Frankie Howerd replaced him.

== Plot ==
Navy frigate the "Aristotle" is sold to a Middle Eastern power, and against regulations the ship's bosun tries to make a profit by selling tickets to passengers seeking a luxury cruise. When the Captain discovers what is going on, he attempts to straighten things out.

== Cast ==
- David Tomlinson as Lieutenant Fairweather
- Frankie Howerd as Bosun
- Shirley Eaton as Jane
- Thora Hird as Mrs. Galloway
- Lionel Jeffries as "Steady" Barker
- Lionel Murton as Perkins
- David Lodge as Scouse
- John Warren as "Cooky"
- Sam Kydd as Bates
- Edwin Richfield as Bennett
- Peter Collingwood as "Chippy"
- Ian Whittaker as Lofty
- Harry Landis as Webster
- Esma Cannon as Maudie
- Tom Gill as Philippe
- Jack Le White as Kentoni Brother
- Max Day as Kentoni Brother
- Eric Pohlmann as President
- Michael Goodliffe as Lieutenant Commander
- Basil Dignam as Flagship Commander
- Judith Furse as Chief Wren
- Ballard Berkeley as Whacker Payne
- Michael Ripper as Ticket Collector
- Stanley Unwin as Porter
- John Stuart as Admiral
- Patrick Holt as First Lieutenant (uncredited)

== Production ==
Guest said "it wasn't a big success at all. Today you can do Police Academy 2, 3, 4, I don't think Up the Creek 2 was ... the gag had been blown somehow."

== Critical reception ==
The Monthly Film Bulletin wrote: "Like its predecessor, Up the Creek [1958], this film starts with a fine comic idea which is then exploited in the least enterprising way. Only the most obvious jokes are extracted from the situation and there is a constant desperate scramble to pile absurdity on top of absurdity. In the prevailing poverty David Tomlinson and Frankie Howerd have to resort to grotesque capers to persuade themselves that they are being funny – but with only intermittent success. Shirley Eaton, acting come-hither with supreme lack of restraint, beams her way good-humouredly through a non-existent role, and only Thora Hird, with her bitter aggressiveness, can bring a dash of badly needed astringency into this rather assorted mixture of established gags."

The Radio Times Guide to Films gave the film 2/5 stars, writing: "Made in something of a hurry by director Val Guest, as he sought to cash in on the success of Up the Creek, this sequel suffers from both indifferent plotting and the absence of Peter Sellers from the role of the scheming bosun. Exploiting the sale of his ship to the ruler of Algerocco by flogging tickets for a Mediterranean cruise, Frankie Howerd (not a natural before the movie camera) works every gag, as the floating con trick is called to action stations."

TV Guide wrote, "less rather than more, as most follow-ups are."
