= Two-Way Stretch =

1960 British film by Robert Day

- Original poster
- Directed by: Robert Day
- Written by: John Warren; Len Heath; Vivian Cox; Alan Hackney (add'l dialogue)
- Produced by: E. M. Smedley-Aston
- Starring: Peter Sellers; Wilfrid Hyde-White; Maurice Denham; Lionel Jeffries; Beryl Reid; David Lodge; Irene Handl; Liz Fraser; Bernard Cribbins
- Cinematography: Geoffrey Faithfull
- Edited by: Bert Rule
- Music by: Ken Jones
- Distributed by: British Lion Films (UK)
- Release date: 11 February 1960 (UK)
- Running time: 83 minutes
- Country: United Kingdom
- Language: English
- Budget: £118,677

Two-Way Stretch, also known as Nothing Barred, is a 1960 British comedy film directed by Robert Day and starring Peter Sellers, Wilfrid Hyde-White, Lionel Jeffries, Bernard Cribbins, and David Lodge. The screenplay is by Vivian Cox, John Warren and Len Heath. A group of prisoners plan to break out of jail, commit a robbery, and then break back into their jail again, thus giving them the perfect alibi – that they were behind bars when the robbery occurred. However, their plans are disrupted by the arrival of a strict new Chief Prison Officer.

== Plot ==
Three prisoners nearing the end of their jail sentences, "Dodger" Lane, "Jelly" Knight and "Lennie the Dip", are visited by a vicar seeking to find employment for them. He is actually conman "Soapy" Stevens, who proposes a big diamond robbery. They will also all have alibis, because they will break out of prison, commit the robbery and then break back in. With the assistance of Dodger's girlfriend Ethel and Lennie's mother the trio smuggle themselves out in a fake prison van driven by Soapy. The operation is almost foiled by the new Chief Prison Officer, disciplinarian "Sour" Crout. The trio return to the prison by hiding inside a garbage truck they know is scheduled to make an early morning pickup at the prison (a load of garbage is unexpectedly dumped on them). The trio hide the diamonds in the Governor's office until they are released and can take them away. All goes well until the sack of diamonds is lost on a train. Stevens is recognized and arrested but not before Crout throttles an actual Vicar and starts a near riot. The others get away, still trying to steal the diamonds again. They are seen in disguise at a ceremony where the Sultan will literally receive his weight in jewels.

== Cast ==
- Peter Sellers as "Dodger" Lane
- Lionel Jeffries as Chief Prison Officer "Sour" Crout
- Wilfrid Hyde-White as "Soapy" Stevens
- Bernard Cribbins as Lennie ("The Dip") Price
- David Lodge as "Jelly" Knight
- Irene Handl as Mrs Price
- Liz Fraser as Ethel
- Maurice Denham as Horatio Bennett, the prison governor
- Beryl Reid as Miss Pringle
- George Woodbridge as Chief Prison Officer Jenkins
- Edwin Brown as warder Charlie
- Cyril Chamberlain as gate warder (day)
- Wallas Eaton as gate warder (night)
- William Abney as visiting room warder
- Thorley Walters as Colonel Parkright
- John Wood as captain
- Robert James as police superintendent
- Walter Hudd as Reverend Patterson
- Mario Fabrizi as Jones
- Warren Mitchell as tailor
- John Glyn-Jones as lawyer
- Arthur Mullard as Fred
- Ian Wilson as milkman
- Edward Dentith as detective
- John Harvey as governor Rockhampton Prison
- Ted Carroll as "Tarzan Model" in art class

== Production ==
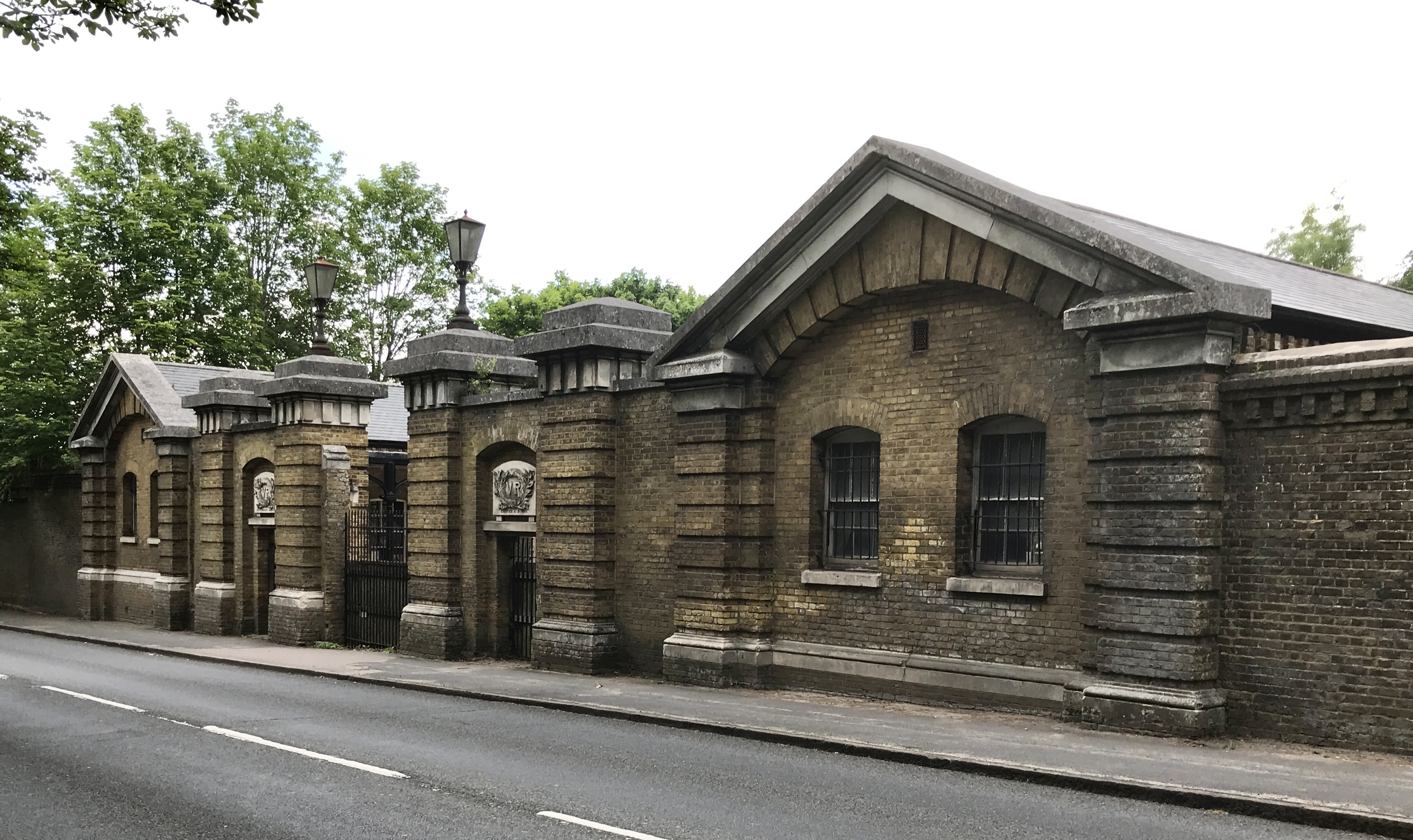
The gates of the former South Cavalry Barracks in Aldershot stood in for the prison gates in the film

The prison scenes were filmed at the South Cavalry Barracks at Aldershot, and the security van robbery at Pirbright Arch in the village of Brookwood in Surrey.

== Critical reception ==
Kine Weekly called the film a "money maker" at the British box office in 1960.

The Monthly Film Bulletin wrote: "Jokes and situations borrowed from many a Service farce and laboured parodies of prisoner-of-war escape films are churned out by a familiar cast in a setting reminiscent of Convict 99. Wilfrid Hyde White easily gives comic point to every unctuous line, but Peter Sellers disappoints after his performance in I'm All Right Jack, as if neither he nor anyone else had worked out what sort of character he should give his convict. All in all, though, the pace and simple, rough humour of the story should guarantee the film a public."

In The New York Times, Bosley Crowther gave it a positive review, writing, "the script by John Warren and Len Heath follows a straight line and is clever and full of good Cockney wit. Robert Day's direction is lively, in the vein of civilized farce, and the performances are delicious, right down the line," concluding, "Mr. Sellers is still on the rise."

Leslie Halliwell wrote: "Amusing comedy with good performances and situations, unofficially borrowed in part from Convict 99."

The Radio Times Guide to Films gave the film 4/5 stars, writing: "Fans of Peter Sellers rate this British venture, made before he started to believe his own publicity, as one of the best things he did. It's a prison comedy with a snarling stand-off between cocky convict Sellers, his cellmates Bernard Cribbins and David Lodge, and paranoid warden Lionel Jeffries. The plot – about a group of prisoners trying to break back into jail after a heist is wonderfully developed and there are delightful cameos along the way."
