= I'm All Right Jack =

1959 British comedy film by John Boulting

- Original British film poster
- Directed by: John Boulting
- Screenplay by: Frank Harvey; John Boulting; Alan Hackney
- Based on: Private Life by Alan Hackney
- Produced by: Roy Boulting
- Starring: Ian Carmichael; Peter Sellers; Richard Attenborough; Margaret Rutherford; Terry-Thomas
- Cinematography: Mutz Greenbaum
- Edited by: Anthony Harvey
- Music by: Ken Hare; Ron Goodwin
- Production company: Charter Film Productions
- Distributed by: British Lion Films (UK)
- Release date: 13 August 1959 (UK)
- Running time: 101 minutes
- Country: United Kingdom
- Language: English

I'm All Right Jack is a 1959 British comedy film directed and produced by John and Roy Boulting from a script by Frank Harvey, John Boulting, and Alan Hackney, based on the 1958 novel Private Life by Alan Hackney.

The film is a sequel to the Boultings' 1956 film Private's Progress and Ian Carmichael, Dennis Price, Richard Attenborough, Terry-Thomas, and Miles Malleson reprise their characters. Peter Sellers played one of his best-remembered roles as trades union shop steward Fred Kite and won a BAFTA Best Actor Award. The rest of the cast included many well-known British comedy actors of the time.

The film is a satire on British industrial life in the 1950s. The title is a well-known English expression indicating smug and complacent selfishness. The trade unions, workers and bosses are all seen to be incompetent or corrupt. The film is one of the satires made by the Boulting Brothers between 1956 and 1963.

== Plot ==
Stanley Windrush chats with his father at the Sunnyglades Nudist Camp, and is persuaded to seek a job as a business executive: he is interviewed for the "Detto" company, which makes washing detergent; he makes a very unfavourable impression and fails to get the job. He is then interviewed for "Num-Yum," a factory which makes processed cakes; they taste good, but the process for making them is very disturbing, and an excess of samples causes him to be sick into a large mixing bowl full of the ingredients. Again, he fails to get the job. The recruitment agent tells Windrush by letter that after getting 11 interviews in 10 days and making a singularly unimpressive impression, industry is not for him.

Windrush's uncle Bertram Tracepurcel and his old army comrade Sidney DeVere Cox persuade him to take an unskilled blue-collar job at Tracepurcel's missile factory, Missiles Ltd. At first suspicious of Windrush as an over-eager newcomer, communist shop steward Fred Kite asks that Stanley be sacked for not having a union card. However, after a period of work-to-rule, he takes Stanley under his wing and even offers to take him in as a lodger. When Kite's daughter Cynthia drops by, Stanley readily accepts.

Meanwhile, personnel manager Major Hitchcock is assigned a time and motion study expert, Waters, to measure the employees' efficiency. The workers refuse to cooperate, but Waters tricks Windrush into showing him how much more quickly he can do his job with his forklift truck than other more experienced employees. When Kite is informed of the results, he calls a strike to protect the rates his union workers are being paid. This is what Cox and Tracepurcel want: Cox owns a company that can take over a large new contract with a Middle Eastern country at an inflated cost. He, Tracepurcel, and a Mr Mohammed, the country's representative, would each pocket a third of the £100,000 difference (£2.0 million today). The excuse to the foreign government is that a faster contract costs more.

The union meets and decides to punish Windrush by "sending him to Coventry", of which he is informed in writing. Stanley's rich aunt visits the Kite household, where she is met by Mrs Kite with some sympathy.

Things do not work out for either side. Cox arrives at his factory, Union Jack Foundries, to find that his workers are walking out in a sympathy strike. The press reports that Kite is punishing Windrush for working hard. When Windrush decides to cross the picket line and return to work (and reveals his connection with the company's owner), Kite asks him to leave his house. This provokes the adoring Cynthia and her mother to go on strike. More strikes spring up, bringing the country to a standstill.

Faced with these new developments, Tracepurcel has no choice but to send Hitchcock to negotiate with Kite. They reach an agreement but Windrush has made both sides look bad and has to go.

Cox tries to bribe Windrush with a bagful of money to resign, but Windrush turns him down. On a televised discussion programme (Argument) hosted by Malcolm Muggeridge, Windrush reveals to the nation the underhanded motivations of all concerned. When he throws Cox's bribe money into the air, the studio audience riots.

In the end, Windrush is accused of causing a disturbance and bound over to keep the peace for 12 months. He is last seen with his father relaxing at a nudist colony, only to need to flee from the female residents' attentions. Unlike in the opening scene, this time he is naked.

== Cast ==
- Ian Carmichael as Stanley Windrush
- Peter Sellers as Fred Kite/Sir John Kennaway
- Terry-Thomas as Major Hitchcock
- Richard Attenborough as Sydney DeVere Cox
- Dennis Price as Bertram Tracepurcel
- Margaret Rutherford as Aunt Dolly
- Irene Handl as Mrs Kite
- Liz Fraser as Cynthia Kite, Fred's daughter
- Miles Malleson as Stanley Windrush's father
- Marne Maitland as Mr Mohammed
- John Le Mesurier as Waters
- Raymond Huntley as magistrate
- Victor Maddern as Knowles
- Kenneth Griffith as Dai
- Fred Griffiths as Charlie
- John Comer as shop steward
- Sam Kydd as shop steward
- Cardew Robinson as shop steward
- Ronnie Stevens as Hooper
- Martin Boddey as Num Yum's executive
- Brian Oulton as Appointments Board examiner
- John Glyn-Jones as Detto executive
- Terry Scott as Crawley
- Alun Owen as film producer
- Eynon Evans as Truscott
- John Van Eyssen as reporter
- David Lodge as card player
- Keith Smith as card player
- Clifford Keedy as card player
- Tony Comer as shop steward
- Wally Patch as worker
- Esma Cannon as Spencer
- E. V. H. Emmett as narrator
- Stringer Davis as journalist
- Malcolm Muggeridge as himself
- Maurice Colbourne as Missiles Director
- Muriel Young as herself
- Frank Phillips as himself

== Release and reception ==
I’m All Right Jack opened at the Leicester Square Theatre in London on 13 August 1959.

=== Box office ===
The film was a big hit, being the most popular film in Britain for the year ended 31 October 1959. It was reportedly the second most profitable British movie that year after Carry On Nurse and helped British Lion enter profitability for the year after two years of losses. Variety reported that by the end of 1959 the film had made $650,000 and was on its way to an estimated $1 million.

=== Critical ===
Bosley Crowther in The New York Times called it "the brightest, liveliest comedy seen this year." Stanley Kauffmann of The New Republic described I'm All Right Jack as a 'consistently diverting lampoon on the new Britain'. On Rotten Tomatoes the film has an approval rating of 88% based on reviews from 8 critics.

== Accolades ==
As well as Sellers' BAFTA, it also won the BAFTA Award for Best British Screenplay.

== See also ==
- English-language accents in film – Cockney
- BFI Top 100 British films
