= Michael Clayton Hutton =

British writer (?–1953)

- Died: 21 August 1953; England, United Kingdom
- Occupation: Playwright

Michael Clayton Hutton was a British author and playwright notable for several plays that appeared in the West End during the post-Second World War era. He died in 1953 at the age of thirty three. He was reportedly suffering from depression when he committed suicide. Several of his plays were adapted for film and television including The Happy Family that was turned into a 1952 film of the same title. He had a posthumous success in the West End with his comedy Silver Wedding in 1957.

== Selected works ==
- Power Without Glory (1947)
- The Happy Family (1951)
- Dead Secret (1952)
- Starlight (1956)
- Silver Wedding (1957)

== Bibliography ==
- Braun, Eric. Frightening the Horses: Gay Icons of the Cinema. Reynolds & Hearn, 2007.
- Goble, Alan. The Complete Index to Literary Sources in Film. Walter de Gruyter, 1999.
- Nelmes, Jill. The Screenwriter in British Cinema. Bloomsbury Publishing, 2019.
- Wearing, J.P. The London Stage 1950–1959: A Calendar of Productions, Performers, and Personnel. Rowman & Littlefield, 2014.
