= Harry Pottle =

British art director (1925–1998)

- Born: 9 December 1925; Brentford, Oxfordshire, United Kingdom
- Died: January 1998-age 73; Dorset, United Kingdom
- Occupation: Art director
- Years active: 1948-1994 (film & TV)

Harry Pottle (1925–1998) was a British art director.

Pottle began his career working for the design team at Alexander Korda's London Films after the Second World War. He designed the sets for twenty five episodes of the television series The Avengers during the mid-1960s. He also worked on The Human Jungle and The Persuaders! Also worked on You Only Live Twice

== Selected filmography ==
- Lost (1956)
- Deadly Record (1959)
- Blind Date (1959)
- The Big Day (1960)
- The Bulldog Breed (1960)
- Snowball (1960)
- The Man in the Back Seat (1961)
- Very Important Person (1961)
- Waltz of the Toreadors (1962)
- The Fast Lady (1962)
- Crooks Anonymous (1962)
- Unearthly Stranger (1963)
- Father Came Too! (1964)
- You Only Live Twice (1967)
- Chitty Chitty Bang Bang (1968)
- The Adventurers (1970)
- Mister Jerico (1970)
- The Firechasers (1971)
- The Tamarind Seed (1974)
- The Wilby Conspiracy (1975)
- Alfie Darling (1975)
- Stand Up, Virgin Soldiers (1977)
- Confessions from a Holiday Camp (1977)
- The Uncanny (1977)
- The Big Sleep (1978)
- The Thirty Nine Steps (1978)
- Murder by Decree (1979)
- Bear Island (1979)
- Funny Money (1983)
- Turk 182 (1985)
- The Second Victory (1987)
- Collision Course (1989)
- Loose Cannons (1990)
- Carry On Columbus (1992)
- It Runs in the Family (1994)

== Bibliography ==
- Piers D. Britton & Simon J. Barker. Reading between Designs: Visual Imagery and the Generation of Meaning in The Avengers, The Prisoner, and Doctor Who. University of Texas Press, 2010.
