= October Moth =

1960 British film by John Kruse

- Directed by: John Kruse
- Screenplay by: John Kruse
- Produced by: Leslie Parkyn; Julian Wintle
- Starring: Lana Morris; Lee Patterson
- Cinematography: Michael Reed
- Edited by: Ralph Sheldon
- Music by: Humphrey Searle
- Production company: Independent Artists
- Distributed by: Rank Film Distributors (UK)
- Release date: September 1960 (UK)
- Running time: 54 minutes
- Country: United Kingdom
- Language: English

October Moth is a 1960 British second feature drama film directed and written by John Kruse and starring Lana Morris and Lee Patterson.

== Plot ==
In an isolated Yorkshire farm house, a deranged young man imagines a car crash victim is his long deceased mother. Meanwhile, his sister Molly attempts to summon help for the unconscious woman, but against her brother's wishes.

== Cast ==
- Lana Morris as Molly
- Lee Patterson as Finlay
- Peter Dyneley as Tom
- Robert Cawdron as Police Constable
- Sheila Raynor as the woman

== Production ==
The film was made at Beaconsfield Studios for distribution by Rank.

== Critical reception ==
The Monthly Film Bulletin wrote: "Stilted dialogue and tame direction fail to sustain one's interest in this somewhat pointless essay in Grand Guignol psychopathology. Lee Patterson manages a surprisingly believable performance as the distracted Finlay and the acting generally is adequate, but one cannot escape the feeling that everyone concerned is groping aimlessly in the dark."

TV Guide wrote, "Had this been done with some sensitivity, it could have been an interesting drama. However, the treatment here is depressing, catering to the basest elements of melodramatic structure, and it ends up a second-rate production."

In British Sound Films: The Studio Years 1928–1959 David Quinlan rated the film as "mediocre", writing: "Resolutely glum."

Leslie Halliwell said: "Unattractive and singularly pointless little melodrama which neither edifies nor entertains."

Film historian Laura Mayne called the film "an atmospheric thriller which follows a mentally unstable young farmer as he kidnaps a woman whom he believes to be his dead mother. He holds her hostage in a farmhouse with his terrified sister while he plays out his dark, Oedipal fantasies. The film is expressionistic in its use of light and shadow, while jarring camerawork lends credence to Lee Patterson's portrayal of a tormented young man, aesthetic qualities that are rarely associated with this level of production.

Filmink called it "a stylishly shot noir-ish melodrama clocking in at 52 minutes and is worth a look."
