= Snowball (1960 film) =

British film by Pat Jackson

- British quad poster
- Directed by: Pat Jackson
- Written by: Anne Francis
- Based on: novel Snowball by James Lake
- Produced by: Leslie Parkyn; Julian Wintle
- Starring: Gordon Jackson; Kenneth Griffith; Zena Walker
- Edited by: Peter Taylor
- Music by: Clifton Parker
- Production company: Independent Artists
- Distributed by: Rank Film Distributors
- Release date: 1960
- Running time: 69 minutes
- Country: United Kingdom
- Language: English

Snowball is a 1960 British drama film directed by Pat Jackson and starring Gordon Jackson, Kenneth Griffith and Zena Walker. It was written by Anne Francis based on the 1958 novel of the same name by James Lake.

== Plot ==
10-year-old Mickey is late home from school. He tells his parents he was thrown off the school bus by the conductor for not having a ticket, obliging him to walk four miles. The local press makes an issue of the incident and the story snowballs out of control. The conductor, Phil Hart, a former POW with memory problems, is harassed until he collapses on railway tracks and is killed by a train. Mickey finally owns up to lying.

== Cast ==
- Gordon Jackson as Bill Donovan
- Kenneth Griffith as Phil Hart
- Zena Walker as Mary Donovan
- Daphne Anderson as Nora Hart
- Dennis Waterman as Mickey Donovan
- John Welsh as Ted Wylie
- Myrtle Reed as Betty Martin
- Wensley Pithey as Jim Adams
- Eric Pohlmann as editor
- Edward Cast as Frank Martin
- Ronald Adam as Mr. King
- Roddy McMillan as Jack, bus conductor
- Jack Stewart as senior reporter
- Anthony Bate as policeman

== Production ==
It was made at Beaconsfield Studios starting 3 May 1960. The film's sets were designed by the art director Harry Pottle.

== Critical reception ==
Monthly Film Bulletin said "Though Pat Jackson's direction misses a few opportunities, this is a fascinating little second feature. The unsophisticated plot, given a few coincidences too many, is well developed and followed through, the everyday characters apart from a naive portrayal of a cub reporter being convincingly interpreted by a well-chosen cast. Zena Walker and Gordon Jackson as the parents, and especially Kenneth Griffith and Daphne Anderson as the accused bus conductor and his loyal wife, play with a minimum of decoration and a maximum of effect in a way that underlines the strength of the film's whole approach."

Kine Weekly said "The picture, which illustrates the saying 'O what a tangled web we weave when we first we practise to deceive, 'occasionally leans on the long arm of coincidence, but, paradoxically enough, the few theatrical tricks sharpen rather than blunt its point. Dennis Waterman is natural and keeps one guessing as Mickey; Zena Walker and Gordon Jackson register as Mary and Bill; and the supporting characters, too, are convincingly drawn. Atmosphere and detail are flawless, and the dialogue flows smoothly. In short, Snowball is the ticket."

Filmink argued the film was "from Independent Artists, who’d just made another child-orientated drama Tiger Bay. Like that, this uncovered a future child star (Dennis Waterman), and it’s a decent movie which builds its tension slowly, but it didn’t meet with Tiger Bay’s success, perhaps because it lacked a juicy murder to give the story stakes from the get-go."
