= Father Came Too! =

1964 British film by Peter Graham Scott

- Directed by: Peter Graham Scott
- Written by: Jack Davies; Henry Blyth
- Produced by: Leslie Parkyn; Julian Wintle
- Starring: James Robertson Justice; Leslie Phillips; Stanley Baxter; Sally Smith
- Cinematography: Reginald Wyer
- Edited by: Tom Priestley
- Music by: Norrie Paramor
- Production company: Independent Artists
- Distributed by: J. Arthur Rank Film Distributors
- Release date: 11 February 1964
- Running time: 91 minutes
- Country: United Kingdom
- Language: English

Father Came Too! is a 1964 British comedy film directed by Peter Graham Scott and starring James Robertson Justice, Leslie Phillips and Stanley Baxter. It was written by Jack Davies and Henry Blyth.

It is a loose sequel to The Fast Lady (1962). FilmInk called it "an old school low budget Rank effort."

== Plot ==
Dexter and Juliet Munro are a young newly married couple who move to a run-down country cottage in hopes of escaping from Juliet's overbearing father, Sir Beverley Grant. However, they are soon confronted by their new home's battered structure. Sir Beverley offers help from a reputable building firm, but this help is refused by Dexter, who wants to remain independent of Juliet's father.

Dexter sees an ad in the local paper and employs Josh to do the work. The house is finished, although well over budget, and eventually burns down because Sir Beverley had changed the fuses from 15A to 30A. Roddy Chipfield, their estate agent (and aspiring actor) saves the day, telling Dexter and Juliet that a motorway is soon to be built on their land, so they can sell at a profit, and gives them the keys to a cottage requiring no work in the adjoining field.

== Cast ==
- James Robertson Justice as Sir Beverley Grant
- Leslie Phillips as Roddy Chipfield
- Stanley Baxter as Dexter Munro
- Sally Smith as Juliet Munro
- Eric Barker as Mr. Gallagher
- Kenneth Cope as Ron
- Terry Scott as executioner
- Hugh Lloyd as Mary, Queen of Scots
- Fred Emney as Sir Francis Drake
- Peter Jones as Charles II
- Ronnie Barker as Josh
- Philip Locke as Stan
- Timothy Bateson as Wally
- Cardew Robinson as fire officer
- Peter Woodthorpe as farmer
- James Villiers as Benzil Bulstrode
- John Bluthal as Robert the Bruce
- Joseph Brady as Guy Fawkes
- Raymond Huntley as Mr. Wedgewood
- Vanda Hudson as Nell Gwynne
- Patrick Newell as King Harold
- Geoffrey Dunn as Mr. Trumper
- Sydney Bromley as Lang
- Julian Orchard as bath salesman
- Clifford Earl as motorcycle policeman
- Nicky Henson as motorcyclist
- Barbara Roscoe as Lana
- Anita Sharp-Bolster as Mrs. Trumper
- Arthur Mullard as traffic warden
- Michael Ward as man at auction

== Production ==
The film was produced by Independent Artists for distribution by Rank. It was shot at Beaconsfield Studios with sets designed by the art director Harry Pottle. The pageant scenes were filmed in the village of Turville in Buckinghamshire. The film's dresses were designed by Julie Harris.

== Reception ==
=== Box office ===
Kinematograph Weekly called the film a "money maker" at the British box office for 1964.

=== Critical reception ===
Monthly Film Bulletin said "Strained comedy which divides its footage more or less equally between James Robertson Justice's familiar act as a curmudgeonly egotist, and a motley collection of well-worn disaster jokes (falling through rotten floor-boards, sloshing paint all over the place, etc. etc.) In the intervals Stanley Baxter and Sally Smith suggest that they might, given half a chance, make a likeable comedy couple; and good supporting actors like Raymond Huntley, James Villiers, Philip Locke and Timothy Bateson have next to nothing to do."

TV Guide noted "A broad British comedy."

Leslie Halliwell said: "Less funny sequel to The Fast Lady, with comic household disasters striking every couple of minutes. Easy-going, and predictably amusing in spots."

The Radio Times Guide to Films gave the film 2/5 stars, writing: "This is a disappointing outing, considering that it had all the makings of being an amusing inversion of the old mother-in-law joke. James Robertson-Justice stars as the father-in-law from hell who shatters the bliss of newlyweds Stanley Baxter and Sally Smith with his tactless intrusions and incessant hectoring. Such is his dominance of the action that there simply aren't enough gags to go round, leaving Leslie Phillips and Ronnie Barker twiddling their thumbs on the periphery."

== See also ==
For the same theme, see A Home of Your Own, 1965.
