= Strictly for the Birds =

1964 British film by Vernon Sewell

- Original British quad poster
- Directed by: Vernon Sewell
- Written by: Tony Hawes
- Produced by: E.M. Smedley-Aston
- Starring: Tony Tanner; Joan Sims; Graham Stark
- Cinematography: Reginald H. Wyer
- Edited by: Peter Taylor
- Music by: Johnny Douglas
- Production company: Independent Artists Studios
- Distributed by: Rank Film Distributors (UK)
- Release date: 29 March 1964 (UK)
- Running time: 63 minutes
- Country: United Kingdom
- Language: English

Strictly for the Birds is a 1964 British second feature comedy film directed by Vernon Sewell and starring Tony Tanner, Joan Sims and Graham Stark. It was written by Tony Hawes. Terry Blessing seems to be having a lucky day, winning at gambling, until a woman with whom he had an assignation six years previously phones him and claims her child is his son.

== Plot ==
Terry Blessing creates a gambling system involving continual use of a ready reckoner. Although his system is very successful, he is ultimately robbed of his winnings by a well-bred young lady whom he accidentally meets after trying to impress her. The minor compensation, of regaining his original stake on a raffle, is also denied him, as it's merely the same amount that he owes to another.

== Production ==
The film was made at Beaconsfield Studios for distribution by the Rank Organisation. Chibnall and McFarlane in The British 'B' Film write that the film was "an apparent homage to its contemporary, Sparrows Can't Sing [1963]", also set in the East End of London.

Sewell said:

The studio was gonna close, but they had a free six weeks, and they had this young man who they thought would be a star. And this very funny comedy was written and they said, "Could I direct now and get it finished within the time?" I said, "Of course I can." And it was made, and there was a very funny thing happened, there was a very funny scene about a firework shop. A boy dropped some matches in a firework shop and this all blows up, there were some very, very funny sequences in it. And we got all the fireworks free from a big firework firm and everything. I showed them stills and they were delighted. Then I said, "Would you like to come and see the movie?" And they saw it, and next day I had a writ... to stop the film. Because they said the firework trade is fighting to keep alive and you're showing in the film just what we say can't happen, you'll do it a lot of damage. I said, "Tell them to go and jump in the sea!" But the Rank lawyers apparently said, "No" and I had to cut the scene out, which is rather stupid because somebody then appeared in black face with no excuse at all!

== Music ==
The film's title song, "Strictly for the Birds", was recorded by Birmingham pop group Pat Wayne and the Beachcombers, and was released on Columbia Records DB 7262.

== Cast ==
- Tony Tanner as Terry Blessing
- Joan Sims as Peggy Blessing
- Graham Stark as Hartley
- Jeanne Moody as Claire
- Alan Baulch as Alfie
- Toni Palmer as Bridget
- Valerie Walsh as Maxine
- Carol Cleveland as Sandra
- Bernard Goldman as Mendoza
- Murray Kash as Mario
- Christine Hargreaves as Linda
- Eddie Leslie as traffic warden
- Eric Dodson as George
- Clement Freud as croupier

== Critical reception ==
The Monthly Film Bulletin wrote: "Rather devoid of anything in the way of an original idea (the title song, with its visual complement of pigeons, is, for instance, irrelevant except as an hommage to Sparrows Can't Sing), this juvenile lark has, at least, the saving grace of brevity. The good-for-nothing Terry and his domineering sister are unsympathetically over-played by Tony Tanner and Joan Sims; but as a farce, made on a low budget and with a basis of reality (however unfair to the working classes), the film has some quite intriguing settings (notably the bookshop and the tenement flat), and Graham Stark gives amusing support as a talented old busker. Vernon Sewell's direction is routine."
