= The Human Jungle (TV series) =

British TV drama series (1963–1965)

- Genre: Psychological drama
- Created by: Ronald J. Kahn
- Starring: Herbert Lom; Sally Smith
- Theme music composer: Bernard Ebbinghouse
- Opening theme: Played by John Barry and his Orchestra
- Country of origin: United Kingdom
- Original language: English
- No. of series: 2
- No. of episodes: 26

Production
- Producers: Julian Wintle; Leslie Parkyn
- Cinematography: Bert Mason
- Running time: 49–51 minutes
- Production company: Independent Artists for ABC Weekend TV

Original release
- Network: ITV
- Release: 30 March 1963 – 13 May 1965

The Human Jungle is a British TV series about a psychiatrist, made for ABC Weekend TV by Independent Artists.

Starring Herbert Lom as Dr Roger Corder and Sally Smith as his daughter Jennifer, it comprised 26 50-minute episodes and ran for two series 1963–1965.

== Premise ==
Each episode focuses on a different patient, whose psychological condition Dr Corder treats using a humane, yet idiosyncratic, approach that mixes Freudian psychoanalysis with the contemporary methods associated with the then-fashionable theories of R. D. Laing. Several psychiatric techniques, such as word association, group work, role-play and hypnotherapy, are featured in the series. Frequently Corder's initial patient in a story turns out not to be the character with the pressing mental health issue.

Because of the constraints of a 50-minute television episode, it was sometimes suggested that Corder would continue to see his patients after the denouement.

== Cast ==
=== Main ===
- Herbert Lom as Dr Roger Corder M.D., D.P.M.
- Michael Johnson as Dr Jimmy Davis
- Sally Smith as Corder's daughter, Jennifer
- Mary Yeomans as secretary, Nancy Hamilton
- Mary Steele as personal assistant, Jane Harris

=== Guests (in surname order) ===
See Episode list

== Production ==
The series was created by Ronald J. Kahn, credited on screen as "assistant to the producers", and produced by Julian Wintle and Leslie Parkyn.

The theme music was composed by Bernard Ebbinghouse, and arranged and recorded by John Barry and his Orchestra.

Several high-profile guest stars appeared in his surgery or as hospital patients, including Joan Collins, Margaret Lockwood, Flora Robson, Roger Livesey, Rita Tushingham and André Morell.

The first series was filmed at Beaconsfield Studios, which closed down shortly after production ended; the second series was shot at the Associated British Studios in Elstree owned by ABC's parent company Associated British Picture Corporation.

The script editor was John Kruse. The advisor on psychiatric content was Dr Hugh L. Freeman, on behalf of the National Association for Mental Health (now Mind).

== Episodes ==
=== Series 1 (1963) ===
Air date is for ABC Weekend TV. ITV regions varied date and order. Episode order is given as per the Network DVD release.

No.	Title	Directed by	Written by	Original release date
1	"The Vacant Chair"	James Hill	Bill MacIlwraith	30 March 1963
Cast: Ronald Leigh-Hunt, Lloyd Lamble, Keith Pyott, Geoffrey Palmer, Edward Evans, Hamilton Dyce and Jonathan Burn
2	"The Flip Side Man"	Sydney A. Hayers	Robert Stewart	6 April 1963
Cast: Jess Conrad, Annette Carell and Michael Ripper
3	"Run with the Devil"	Vernon Sewell	David T Chantler; John Kruse (story)	13 April 1963
Cast: Derek Farr, Walter Hudd, Andrée Melly, Jenny Laird, Harry Fowler, Anita Sharp-Bolster and Hugh Cross
4	"Thin Ice"	John Ainsworth	Bill MacIlwraith; Robert Stewart (story)	20 April 1963
Guest stars Janina Faye, George A. Cooper and Cyril Chamberlain
5	"The Lost Hours"	John Ainsworth	John Kruse	27 April 1963
Cast: Leonard Sachs, Ursula Howells, Joyce Heron, Robin Hawdon, Frank Jarvis and Larry Martyn
6	"A Friend of the Sergeant Major"	Don Sharp	Lewis Davidson	4 May 1963
Cast: Alfred Burke, Tim Seely, Peter Williams, Redmond Phillips, Cavan Kendall, Richard Leech, Peter Madden and John Harvey
7	"14 Ghosts"	Sydney A. Hayers	Leo Leiberman	11 May 1963
Cast: Avice Landon, André Morell, Justine Lord, William Marlowe, Peter Bathurst and Bernard Davies
8	"Fine Feathers"	Vernon Sewell	Robert Stewart	18 May 1963
Cast: Jane Merrow, Philip Gilbert, Jeremy Burnham, Miranda Connell, Richard Warner, Harold Berens and Patricia Marmont
9	"The Wall"	James Hill	John Kruse	25 May 1963
Cast: Jeremy Spenser, Catherine Feller, Blake Butler, Arnold Diamond, Rosamund Greenwood and Hana Maria Pravda
10	"A Woman with Scars"	James Hill	Robert Stewart	1 June 1963
Cast: Jeanne Moody, Frank Lawton, John Glyn-Jones, Rosalie Crutchley and Robin Hughes
11	"Time-Check"	Alan Cooke	Lewis Davidson	8 June 1963
Cast: Melvyn Hayes, Gerald James, Fabia Drake, Warren Mitchell, John Arnatt, Douglas Blackwell and Mitzi Rogers
12	"The Two Edged Sword"	Vernon Sewell	Bill MacIlwraith	15 June 1963
Cast: Susan Burnet, Pauline Yates, Frederick Piper, Beatrice Varley, William Kendall, Roger Delgado and Glynn Edwards
13	"Over and Out"	Vernon Sewell	John Kruse; Lewis Davidson (story)	22 June 1963
Cast: Ian Bannen, Eddie Byrne, Zena Marshall, June Barry, John Boxer, Simon Lack and Gerald Andersen

=== Series 2 (1965) ===
Air date is for Associated-Rediffusion. ITV regions varied date and order. ABC Weekend Television was broadcast two days later. Order as for the Network DVD release.

No. overall	No. in series	Title	Directed by	Written by	Original release date
14	1	"Struggle for a Mind"	Sydney A. Hayers	John Kruse	18 February 1965
Cast: Joan Collins, Clifford Evans, Derek Godfrey, Kay Walsh and Margaret Whiting
15	2	"Success Machine"	Sydney A. Hayers	John Kruse	25 February 1965
Cast: Edward Judd, Sylvia Syms, Harold Goldblatt, Jack Smethurst, Philip Latham, Ruth Trouncer and Wanda Ventham
16	3	"The 24-Hour Man"	Robert Day	Robert Stewart	4 March 1965
Cast: Johnny Sekka, Dolores Mantez, Inigo Jackson, Donald Morley, Frank Coda and Mark Lester
17	4	"Solo Performance"	Roy Baker	Bill MacIlwraith	11 March 1965
Cast: Margaret Lockwood, James Villiers, Rona Anderson, Terence Brook and Malcolm Tierney
18	5	"Ring of Hate"	Charles Crichton	John Kruse; Leo Lieberman (story)	18 March 1965
Cast: Dudley Sutton, Bernard Lee, Francis Matthews, Walter Gotell, Jimmy Gardner, Peter Diamond
19	6	"Conscience on a Rack"	Roy Baker	Bill MacIlwraith	25 March 1965
Cast: Flora Robson, Megs Jenkins, Ronald Hines and Adrienne Posta
20	7	"The Quick and the Dead"	Roy Baker	John Kruse	1 April 1965
Cast: Richard Johnson, Robert Beatty, Andrew Keir, David McAlister and Moray Watson
21	8	"The Man Who Fell Apart"	Roy Baker	John Kruse	8 April 1965
Cast: Rita Tushingham, Barbara Shelley, Alan Dobie, Patrick O'Connell, Griffith Davies
22	9	"Dual Control"	Roy Baker	Anne Francis	15 April 1965
Cast: Peggy Cummins, Dennis Price, Annette Andre, Rona Anderson and Yvonne Antrobus
23	10	"Skeleton in the Cupboard"	Roy Baker	Bill MacIlwraith	22 April 1965
Cast: Roger Livesey, Ann Firbank, Allan Cuthbertson, Russell Waters and Donald Pickering
24	11	"Wild Goose Chase"	Vernon Sewell	Marc Brandel	29 April 1965
Cast: Francesca Annis, Vladek Sheybal, Faith Brook, Gary Watson, Aimée Delamain and Tony Steedman
25	12	"Enemy Outside"	Roy Baker	Bill MacIlwraith	6 May 1965
Guest star Lloyd Reckord, Tony Tanner, Avis Bunnage, Barbara Ferris and Rona Anderson
26	13	"Heartbeats in a Tin Box"	Roy Baker	Robert Stewart	13 May 1965
Cast: Susan George, Gerald Harper, Ray McAnally, John Junkin, Donald Eccles, Tenniel Evans and Arnold Ridley

== Home release ==
The complete series was released in November 2012 as a 7 DVD (Region 2) boxset with accompanying series guide by Andrew Pixley.
