= Waltz of the Toreadors (film) =

- Original US film poster
- Directed by: John Guillermin
- Screenplay by: Wolf Mankowitz
- Based on: The Waltz of the Toreadors by Jean Anouilh
- Starring: Peter Sellers; Dany Robin; John Fraser; Cyril Cusack; Margaret Leighton
- Cinematography: John Wilcox
- Edited by: Peter Taylor
- Music by: Richard Addinsell
- Production company: Independent Artists
- Distributed by: Rank Film Distributors; Continental Distributing (US)
- Release dates: 12 April 1962 (World Premiere, London)
- Running time: 105 minutes
- Country: United Kingdom
- Language: English
- Budget: £400,000

Waltz of the Toreadors (also known as The Amorous General) is a 1962 film directed by John Guillermin and starring Peter Sellers and Dany Robin. It was based on the play of the same name by Jean Anouilh with the location changed from France to England. It was nominated for a BAFTA Award for Best British Screenplay at the 16th British Academy Film Awards in 1963.

The film had its World Premiere on 12 April 1962 at the Odeon Leicester Square in London's West End. Guillermin later said "it was about the irony of old age and had a light touch".

== Plot ==
This is the end of a glorious military career: General Leo Fitzjohn retires to his Sussex manor where he will write his memoirs. Unfortunately, his private life is a disaster: a confirmed womanizer, Leo has infuriated his wife Emily, now a shrewish and hypochondriac woman, all the more bitter as she still loves him. The General has two plain-looking daughters, Estella and Sidonia, he dislikes and an attractive French mistress, Ghislaine, with whom he has had a platonic affair for seventeen years. When Ghislaine resurfaces, determined to complete her love with him and to get rid of Emily, Leo is at a loss what to do.

== Cast ==
- Peter Sellers as General Leo Fitzjohn
- Dany Robin as Ghislaine
- Margaret Leighton as Emily Fitzjohn
- John Fraser as Lieutenant Robert Finch
- Cyril Cusack as Dr. Grogan
- Prunella Scales as Estella Fitzjohn
- Denise Coffey as Sidonia Fitzjohn
- Jean Anderson as Agnes
- Raymond Huntley as Ackroyd
- Cardew Robinson as Midgley
- John Glyn-Jones as Jenkins
- Catherine Feller as Rosemary
- John Le Mesurier as Reverend Grimsley
- Vanda Godsell as Mrs. Emma Bulstrode
- Humphrey Lestocq as Fox Hunter

== Production ==
The play The Waltz of the Toreadors had been a success on the London stage in 1957 in a production featuring Ralph Richardson and Margaret Leighton. Julian Wintle and Leslie Parkyn acquired the screen rights for their company, Independent Artists.

In February 1961, it was announced Peter Sellers would star in an adaptation of the play from a script by Wolf Mankowitz. Sellers was much in demand at the time, having completed Lolita (1962) and Mr Topaze (1961). John Guillermin, who eventually directed, had made Never Let Go (1960) with Sellers for Independent Artists. The director says Mankowitz wrote the script in two weeks. Finance came from The Rank Organisation. Maria Schell was to be Sellers' co star. She was replaced by Dany Robin.

The film was presold to America's Continental Releasing, which was unusual for British independent movies. Filming took place at Pinewood Studios in September 1961. Guillermin later claimed "the film was fucked up by the producers. They wanted to make a slapstick comedy." He says he was "thrown off the editing of the film" and in particular claims the producers ruined a ten minute scene of General Leo Fitzjohn (Sellers) and Emily Fitzjohn (Leighton) which was taken directly from the play, and was filmed in one long take; Guillermin says this was intercut with a scene of Ghislaine (Robin) and Lieutenant Robert Finch (John Fraser). "It totally took the heart out of the film."

== Reception ==
=== Box Office ===
The film was the 11th most popular movie at the British box office in 1962.

=== Critical ===
The Monthly Film Bulletin wrote: "Anouilh's plays, with their effortless theatricality, their bittersweet transitions and endless playing off of innocence against experience, demand staging of some subtlety, and at the very least staging which accepts the conventions within which they work. Wolf Mankowitz, as adaptor, and John Guillermin, as director, have walked in hob-nailed boots over this one, making it part pseudo-Gallic romp (moustachioed general let loose among the girls), part charade (general and doctor fight a duel with sword and umbrella), and leaving the actors to struggle through the serious scenes. Margaret Leighton, bicycling madly towards the railway track in nightdress and jockey cap, to be told by the porter that there is no train for her to throw herself under today, makes a fine figure. ... John Guillermin can move his camera smartly – as in the ballroom scene, a series of moving pans over a dancing image – and bring style to a scene or a moment (the very first appearance of Ghislaine); and his designer has created some pretty sets. Overall, though, Waltz of the Toreadors disastrously lacks taste, discretion and edge. And Peter Sellers, in another clever bit of mimicry, somehow emphasises this by his air of having not much to do with the rest of the cast, of being absorbed in the details of his own impersonation."

In The New York Times, Bosley Crowther wrote, "Mr. Sellers, still in his thirties, plays the comically stiff and paunchy role of a retired British Army general with a still-eager eye for the girls, and he does it with detail so deft and devilish that he adds another jewel to his crown."

FilmInk said "I don't think comedy was Guillermin's strong suit".

== Notes ==
- Sikov, Ed (2002). Mr. Strangelove. Hyperion.
