= Devil's Bait =

1959 British film by Peter Graham Scott

- Australian one sheet poster
- Directed by: Peter Graham Scott
- Written by: Peter Johnston; Diana Watson
- Produced by: Leslie Parkyn; Julian Wintle
- Starring: Geoffrey Keen; Jane Hylton; Gordon Jackson
- Cinematography: Michael Reed
- Edited by: John Trumper
- Music by: William Alwyn
- Production company: Independent Artists
- Distributed by: Rank Film Distributors (UK)
- Release date: December 1959 (UK)
- Running time: 58 minutes
- Country: United Kingdom
- Language: English

Devil's Bait is a 1959 black and white British second feature ('B') drama film directed by Peter Graham Scott and starring Geoffrey Keen, Jane Hylton and Gordon Jackson. It was written by Peter Johnston and Diana Watson, and made by the Rank Organisation.

== Plot ==
Local baker Joe Frisby calls the Town Hall to make another complaint about rats eating his flour. The council rat catchers are not available, and the switchboard girl gives Frisby a lead on a cheap rat-catcher – Mr Love, who in fact has no qualifications whatsoever.

At the bakery Love uses a loaf tin for mixing his rat poison. The tin is distinctive, having a side split which causes the bread to be mis-shapen. When Mrs Frisby runs out of intact loaf tins she uses the split tin and inadvertently bakes a poisoned loaf.

Love drinks his payment and is killed in an accident as he staggers home. His landlady tells the police he was carrying cyanide which he used at Frisby's bakery. Frisby, having found the empty cyanide bottle, fears this could ruin his business and denies any knowledge. Meanwhile Mrs Frisby smells the cyanide in the empty tin. A frantic search begins for the poisoned loaf.

== Cast ==
- Geoffrey Keen as Joe Frisby
- Jane Hylton as Ellen Frisby
- Gordon Jackson as Sergeant Malcolm
- Dermot Kelly as Mr Love
- Shirley Lawrence as Shirley
- Eileen Moore as Barbara
- Molly Urquhart as Mrs Tanner
- Noel Hood as Mrs Evans
- Rupert Davies as landlord

== Production ==
The film was made at Beaconsfield Studios, Buckinghamshire, England, and on location.

== Reception ==
The Monthly Film Bulletin wrote: "Here is a reasonable attempt to depart from the stereotyped and do something more unusual in the field of the second-feature suspense thriller. The plot starts a little slowly and there are a few improbabilities, but it is simply and effectively put over.”

In British Sound Films David Quinlan said: "Distinctive, quite suspenseful little drama, with well-drawn characters".

Devil's Bait was selected by film historians Steve Chibnall and Brian McFarlane as one of the 15 most meritorious British B films made between World War II and 1970. They note its narrative command and tension and the way the film moves forward "to a satisfyingly taut end – and one which leaves both narrative and character interests gratified. ... The excellent performances of Hylton and Keen create a wholly convincing sense of two people whose relationship is under the strain of everyday irritations and who are imperceptibly drawn closer by the near disaster in which they are caught up."
