= Breakout (1959 film) =

British film by Peter Graham Scott

- Directed by: Peter Graham Scott
- Written by: Peter Barnes
- Based on: the book Breakout by Frederick Oughton
- Produced by: Leslie Parkyn; Julian Wintle
- Starring: Lee Patterson; Hazel Court; Terence Alexander; Dermot Kelly
- Cinematography: Eric Cross
- Edited by: Eric Boyd-Perkins
- Production company: Independent Artists
- Distributed by: Anglo-Amalgamated Film Distributors (UK)
- Release date: March 1959; (UK)
- Running time: 62 minutes
- Country: United Kingdom
- Language: English

Breakout is a 1959 British crime drama film directed by Peter Graham Scott and starring Lee Patterson, Hazel Court and Terence Alexander. It was written by Peter Barnes based on the 1959 novel Breakout by Frederick Oughton.

== Plot ==
Arkwright is a fraudster serving a seven-year prison sentence. He gets word to his contact Chandler that he wants out. Chandler and his partner Farrow contract George Munro to organise the job of springing Arkwright. Munro hatches a plan involving a rigged delivery van.

== Cast ==
- Lee Patterson as George Munro
- Hazel Court as Rita Arkwright
- Terence Alexander as Steve Farrow
- William Lucas as Chandler
- John Paul as Arkwright
- Billie Whitelaw as Rose Munro
- Dermot Kelly as O'Quinn
- Estelle Brody as Maureen O'Quinn
- Rupert Davies as Morgan
- Lloyd Lamble as Inspector
- Neil McCarthy as getaway driver (uncredited)
- George Woodbridge as landlord (uncredited)

== Production ==
The film was shot at Beaconsfield Studios. Location shooting took place in the West End area of Aldershot in Hampshire. The gates of the East Cavalry Barracks on Barrack Road stood in for the prison gates used in the breakout. Other scenes were filmed in Uxbridge.

== Critical reception ==
The Monthly Film Bulletin wrote: "This moderately tense crime thriller distracts attention from the improbability of the escape preparations by skilful handing of background and detail. Although there is an intermittently successful attempt to build up Monro as a convincing character, the other figures all come from stock."

Picturegoer wrote: "For the sake of British second features, let's hope Lee Patterson never gets into the big-star bracket. Once again, he brings a firm, dramatic assurance to the character of an escape expert engaged to plan the break-out from prison of a confidence trickster. Cleverly contrived and plausibly executed, it's a more-than-usually exciting film. The brisk acting of Patterson, William Lucas, Terence Alexander and Hazel Court skilfully disguises any weakness in the characterization."

Picture Show called the film an: "ingenious thriller", adding "the story calls for action, pace and a good climax and the film has all three. Interesting entertainment."

In British Sound Films David Quinlan called the film a "quite exciting vest-pocket thriller with edgy performances."
