= Independent Artists (company) =

British film production company

Opening logo from Night of the Eagle (1961)

Independent Artists was a British production company of the 1950s and 1960s. It specialised in making second features.

The company was strongest from 1958-63 when Julian Wintle ran it with Leslie Parkyn out of Beaconsfield Film Studios.

Their films Waltz of the Toreadors (1962) and Tiger Bay (1959) were BAFTA nominated and BAFTA winning; while This Sporting Life (1963) was Oscar nominated and BAFTA winning.

== Filmography ==
- The Dark Man (1951)
- The Stranger in Between (1952) a.k.a. Hunted - directed by Charles Crichton
- Death Goes to School (1953)
- Bachelor of Hearts (1958)
- Tiger Bay (1959)
- Breakout (1959)
- Violent Moment (1959) a.k.a. Rebound
- Deadly Record (1959)
- Chance Meeting (1959) a.k.a. Blind Date - directed by Joseph Losey
- The White Trap (1959)
- Devil's Bait (1959)
- Never Let Go (1960) -directed by John Guillermin with Richard Todd, Peter Sellers
- The Big Day (1960)
- October Moth (1960)
- The Malpas Mystery (1960)
- Linda (1960) - directed by Don Sharp with Carol White
- Snowball (1960) - with Denis Waterman
- The Professionals (1960) -directed by Don Sharp
- The River of Life (1960) (documentary short)
- Sea Sanctuary (1960) (documentary short)
- Seven Keys (1961) - directed by Pat Jackson
- Very Important Person (1961)
- House of Mystery (1961)
- The Man in the Back Seat (1961)
- Echo of Barbara (1961)
- Waltz of the Toreadors (1962) - directed by John Guillermin with Peter Sellers
- Night of the Eagle (1962) a.k.a. Burn, Witch, Burn
- Crooks Anonymous (1962) - directed by Ken Annakin with Leslie Phillips and Julie Christie
- Play It Cool (1962) - directed by Michael Winner with Billy Fury
- Our National Heritage: The Living Pattern (1962) (documentary short)
- The Fast Lady (1963) - directed by Ken Annakin with Stanley Baxter and Julie Christie
- This Sporting Life (1963) - directed by Lindsay Anderson with Richard Harris
- The Human Jungle (1963–1964) (TV series)
- Unearthly Stranger (1963)
- Bitter Harvest (1963) - with Janet Munro
- Father Came Too! (1964)
- Strictly for the Birds (1964)
