= John Foley (author) =

British soldier and writer (1917–1974)

Cedric John Foley MBE (7 March 1917 – 8 November 1974) was a British Army officer, author, broadcaster, and public relations specialist.

He was educated at St Mary's College, Crosby and the Royal Military College, Sandhurst. A regular soldier between 1936 and 1954, he was made MBE for his services to the Royal Armoured Corps during the Second World War.

His love of tanks was reflected in The Boilerplate War, a book of recollections of the early days of armoured warfare, and Mailed Fist, telling of his tank exploits in Normandy in 1944. He drew on his military experience in several other successful novels, including Death of a Regiment and Bull and Brass.

He spent five years as a military reporter and later served in the Directorate of Public Relations at the War Office.

On retiring from the Army, he continued in public relations, and became prominent as a consultant, being particularly concerned with the problems of American-owned businesses in Britain. He was also a director of Campbell-Johnson Ltd.

A man of wide interests, he was also known as a broadcaster and scriptwriter, and was military advisor to the popular ITV comedy show, The Army Game.

He is also the author of two screenplay novelisations, published in paperback as media tie-ins, which some sources erroneously list as original novels upon which the films were based, although each book cover states that it is "the book of the film", and cites its screenplay origins and authors.

- Man in the Moon (1960, starring Kenneth More and Shirley Anne Field), based on the screenplay by Bryan Forbes and Michael Relph (Four Square Books), which is credited on the back cover
- Very Important Person (1961, starring James Robertson Justice and Leslie Phillips), based on the screenplay by Jack Davies and Henry Blyth (Mayfair Books), which is cited on the back cover, the title page and (by implication in) a joint copyright shared by John Foley and Jack Davies
