= The White Trap =

1959 film directed by Sidney Hayers

- British theatrical poster
- Directed by: Sidney Hayers
- Screenplay by: Peter Barnes
- Produced by: Julian Wintle; Leslie Parkyn
- Starring: Lee Patterson; Conrad Phillips
- Cinematography: Eric Cross
- Edited by: Tristam Cones
- Music by: Franz Reizenstein
- Production company: Independent Artists
- Distributed by: Anglo-Amalgamated Film Distributors (UK)
- Release date: August 1959 (UK)
- Running time: 58 minutes
- Country: United Kingdom
- Language: English

The White Trap is a 1959 British second feature ('B') thriller film directed by Sidney Hayers and starring Lee Patterson. The screenplay was by Peter Barnes.

== Plot ==
Escaped convict Paul Langley tries to reach his wife who is about to have a baby.

== Cast ==
- Lee Patterson as Paul Langley
- Conrad Phillips as Sgt. Morrison
- Michael Goodliffe as Inspector Walters
- Yvette Wyatt as Ann Fisher
- Felicity Young as Joan Langley
- Trevor Maskell as Dr. Lucas
- Harold Siddons as Maitland
- Charles Leno as Padre
- Ian Colin as Governor
- Helen Towers as Hilda Maxwell
- Jack Allen as Dr. Hayden
- Gillian Vaughan as Wendy
- John Abineri as Bernie, a Photographer (uncredited)

== Critical reception ==
The Monthly Film Bulletin wrote: "An efficient low-budget chase thriller, neither particularly credible nor (in its hectic opening escape scenes) original, but sufficiently taut and showmanlike to grip the attention."

Picturegoer wrote: "The escape opening is somewhat routine, but the chase leads up excitingly to a twist ending."

Picture Show wrote: "There is nothing out of the ordinary about the first half of the film, although it never drags, but it picks up towards the end when there is an entertaining mixture of action, humour and feminine appeal."

TV Guide wrote "The suspense builds up towards the end, but the plot is unrelentingly downbeat."

Noirish noted "one of those unexpected gems that occasionally bring joy to the B-feature watcher’s heart."

== Home media ==
The film is available as a Special Feature on Edgar Wallace Mysteries volume 2, released by Network DVD in 2012.
