= Tiger Bay (1959 film) =

- UK theatrical poster
- Directed by: J. Lee Thompson
- Written by: John Hawkesworth; Shelley Smith (Note: Pen name of Nancy Hermione Bodington.)
- Based on: Rodolphe et le Revolver short story by Noël Calef
- Produced by: John Hawkesworth
- Starring: John Mills; Horst Buchholz; Hayley Mills
- Cinematography: Eric Cross
- Edited by: Sidney Hayers
- Music by: Laurie Johnson
- Production company: Independent Artists
- Distributed by: Rank Film Distributors
- Release date: March 1959
- Running time: 103 minutes
- Country: United Kingdom
- Language: English

Tiger Bay is a 1959 British crime drama film directed by J. Lee Thompson. It stars John Mills as a police superintendent investigating a murder; his real-life daughter Hayley Mills, in her first major film role, as a girl who witnesses the murder; and Horst Buchholz as a young sailor who commits the murder in a moment of passion. The title refers to the Tiger Bay district of Cardiff, where much of the film was shot.

The film features many authentic scenes of the children's street culture and the black street culture of the time, along with many dockside shots and scenes in real pubs and the surrounding countryside. Unusually, the overall ambience of the film is one of sympathy towards the killer, seeing him as a basically good person, and victim of circumstance. As such, the film marks a vital transitional moment in the move towards the British New Wave cinema exemplified a few years later by A Taste of Honey.

Tiger Bay was released by Rank Film Distributors in March 1959. It received widely positive reviews from critics, and was a commercial success, helping to launch a then-11-year-old Hayley Mills's acting career. The film was nominated for four BAFTA Awards, including Best Film and Outstanding British Film, with Mills winning Most Promising Newcomer to Leading Film Roles. At the 9th Berlin International Film Festival, the film was nominated for the Golden Bear and Mills received a Special Mention for her performance.

== Plot ==
A young Polish sailor, Bronislav "Bronek" Korchinsky, arrives in Cardiff, planning to propose to his girlfriend Anya, a Polish exile. However, he discovers Anya gone and finds a harbor hooker living in the flat. The landlord reveals that Anya left several weeks ago and owes back rent, even though Bronek was sending monthly payments to her. Bronek pays Anya's debts so that the landlord will give him her new address.

Meanwhile, Gillie Evans, an orphaned eleven year old tomboy who lives with her Aunt, is playing with boys at the dockside. Bronek approaches the group, seeking help in locating the address he has been given. Gillie, who lives in the same building, a seedy tenement, walks with him.

Bronek finds Anya in her new flat, but she tells him to leave. Frustrated by Bronek's long trips at sea, Anya has been seeing a married older man, a sportscaster named Barclay. Bronek, furious with jealousy, screams at her, and she pulls a gun from her dresser, but he takes the gun and shoots Anya dead. Gillie who had been playing in the staircase with a banger, hears the shouting and witnesses the murder as she peeks through the apartment door's letter box. Gillie's play with her "toy bomb" has also masked the sounds of the gun shots for the rest of the building.

Gillie sees where Bronek hides the gun, and she takes it to gain reputation among the other children. Barclay arrives to visit Anya, but, finding her dead, quickly disappears. A neighbour woman discovers the body and summons the police.

The investigating police superintendent, Graham, learns that Gillie was in the hall during the shooting and deduces that she witnessed the murder. However, Gillie, a habitual liar, gives an incorrect description of Bronek and does not tell Graham that she has the gun. Later, Bronek, who saw Gillie take the gun, chases her into the attic. He takes the gun from her, and they become friends. He agrees to take her to sea with him when he flees the country.

Bronek plans to depart the next day on a Venezuelan merchant ship, the Poloma; for the night, Gillie leads him to a hiding place in the countryside, where he entertains her by re-enacting his overseas adventures. Meanwhile, the police discover a photograph of Bronek and Anya together, sparking interest in Bronek's identity. Under police questioning Barclay admits to having visited Anya's apartment the day she was shot, making him a prime suspect.

With the Poloma set to sail, Bronek persuades Gillie to let him go alone. Bronek leaves her with his metal cigarette case. Some picnickers find Gillie at the country hideout and take her to the police, where she continues to lie, identifying Barclay as the murderer. With Barclay as the suspect, she admits that she saw the crime and re-enacts it for Graham at the apartment, but accidentally reveals that she knows the killer is Polish. She still denies knowing Bronek, but by now the police know he is the murderer. Both the police and Bronek are aware of the three-mile limit for British legal jurisdiction.

Graham drives Gillie to the pilot station at Barry Docks and takes her on a pilot boat to the Poloma as the ship approaches the boundary of territorial waters. At this point, Gillie is obviously trying to obstruct Graham's progress. When the inspector confronts Gillie and Bronek now together aboard the Poloma, they deny knowing each other. Nevertheless, Graham attempts to arrest Bronek, but the ship's captain prevents him, saying that his navigation officer has plotted Poloma's position as just outside the three-mile limit, and therefore beyond the jurisdiction of the British police.

Gillie runs around on the ship trying to evade both crew and police, and falls overboard while trying to stow away on the ship in the hope of remaining with Bronek. Being the only person to see her fall, Bronek dives into the water to save her and loses his ship. The pair are rescued by the police boat sent from Barry Island. Bronek admits his guilt after Gillie hugs him, and Graham commends him for his bravery in saving her. The Poloma sails off and his chance of freedom has gone.

== Cast ==
- John Mills as Police Superintendent Graham
- Horst Buchholz as Bronislav "Bronek" Korchinsky
- Hayley Mills as Gillie Evans
- Anthony Dawson as Barclay
- Yvonne Mitchell as Anya Haluba
- Megs Jenkins as Mrs. Phillips
- George Selway as Detective Sergeant Harvey
- George Pastell as Poloma Captain
- Paul Stassino as Poloma First Officer
- Marne Maitland as Dr. Das
- Meredith Edwards as PC Williams
- Marianne Stone as Mrs Williams
- Rachel Thomas as Mrs Parry
- Brian Hammond as Dai Parry
- Kenneth Griffith as Choirmaster
- Eynon Evans as Mr. Morgan
- Christopher Rhodes as Inspector Bridges
- Edward Cast as Detective Constable Thomas
- Shari as Christine
- Harry Baird as Bridegroom

== Production ==
The film was based on a short story Rodolphe et le Revolver by French writer Noël Calef. In the story the witness to the murder was a young boy. Director J. Lee Thompson originally intended to film it that way and in August 1958 sent a copy of the script to John Mills, with whom he had worked on Ice Cold in Alex and wanted to play the part of the detective. Mills felt the right actor in the part of the 12-year-old boy would "walk away with the picture" but he liked the script and wanted to work with Thompson again.

The role of the boy was originally offered to Colin Petersen who had been in Smiley. However his parents wanted to return to Australia so they rejected the role.

Thompson went to Mills's house in Sussex to discuss the project and wound up talking to Mills's daughter Hayley. After lunch he told Mills that he wanted to change the role of the boy to a girl and cast Hayley in the part as "the whole story will be much more moving and touching in every way." Although Hayley had not expressed that much interest in acting, John Mills and his wife agreed. Thompson decided to cast her even without testing.

The role of male lead went to Horst Buchholz. Several movies financed by Rank had German stars around this time in an attempt to appeal to the German market.

Filming started 15 September 1958. The film was shot mostly on location in the Tiger Bay district of Cardiff, at Newport Transporter Bridge in Newport (12 miles/19 km from Cardiff) and at Avonmouth Docks in Bristol. Other scenes were shot at Beaconsfield Studios.

Regarding daughter Hayley's acting abilities, John Mills said when they started filming "I simply couldn't believe what was happening. She looked as if she'd been born in front of a camera."

Although the captain and first officer of the Poloma are shown speaking Spanish, the actors were both Cypriots.

== Reception ==
=== Critical reception ===
Variety said the film "stacks up as a lively piece of drama... no blockbuster but it is plausible and holding."

Filmink called it "a terrific thriller-drama from Thompson’s peak period, which benefits from location shooting, confident handling, and, most of all the performance of Hayley Mills. She’s a wonder – completely natural, relaxed."

=== Box office ===
The film was popular at the box office. According to Kinematograph Weekly the film performed "better than average" at the British box office in 1959 and "steered steadily into the money."

John Mills said after the film there were no offers for Hayley's services from British film producers, but Walt Disney offered her the lead in Pollyanna (released in 1960). This launched Hayley Mills' career as a movie star. Buchholz and Thompson were to reunite in a film called The Rebel but it appears to have not been made.

=== Awards and nominations ===
- 1960 Won BAFTA Film Award – Most Promising Newcomer to Film, Hayley Mills
- 1960 Nominated BAFTA Film Award – Best British Film, J. Lee Thompson
- 1960 Nominated BAFTA Film Award – Best British Screenplay, John Hawkesworth and Shelley Smith
- 1960 Nominated BAFTA Film Award – Best Film from any Source, J. Lee Thompson
- 1959 Won Silver Bear, 9th Berlin International Film Festival Special Prize, Hayley Mills
- 1959 Nominated Golden Berlin Bear, J. Lee Thompson

== Unproduced remake ==
In 1992, J. Lee Thompson said he was trying to finance a remake of Tiger Bay with Anna Chlumsky and Alec Baldwin. The director said "I have certain regrets now. I would rather have stuck to making films like Yield to the Night which had some integrity and importance. But the British film industry caved in. I shouldn't denigrate myself too much because I have enjoyed making my films but I suppose I sort of sold out." The film was ultimately never produced.

== Bibliography ==
- Williams, Melanie (Autumn 2005). "'I'm not a lady!': Tiger Bay (1959) and transitional girlhood in British cinema on the cusp of the 1960s". Screen. 46 (3): 361–372. doi:10.1093/screen/46.3.361.
- Mills, John (1981). Up in the clouds, gentlemen please. Penguin.
