= Keith Pyott =

British actor (1902–1968)

- in Village of the Damned (1960)
- Born: Keith Malcolm Rule Pyott; 9 March 1902; Blackheath, London, England
- Died: 6 April 1968 (aged 66); Enfield, Middlesex, England
- Occupation: Actor

Keith Pyott (9 March 1902 – 6 April 1968) was a British actor.

He transferred from stage to screen and was a regular face in drama in the early days of television, appearing in Educated Evans, The Prisoner, Out of the Unknown, The Avengers and the Doctor Who story The Aztecs.

He also appeared in over twenty feature films, including Orson Welles' Chimes at Midnight (1965).

Pyott was married to the actress Sheila Raynor.

== Selected filmography ==
- Call of the Blood (1948) - Dr. Sabatier
- The Spider and the Fly (1949) - Father Pletsier
- Distant Trumpet (1952) - Sir Rudolph Gettins
- Time Bomb (1953) - Train District Supt. (uncredited)
- Sea Devils (1953) - General Latour
- The House of the Arrow (1953) - Gaston, the butler
- A Day to Remember (1953) - Frenchman with Watches (uncredited)
- John Wesley (1954) - Rev. Samuel Wesley
- Twist of Fate (1954) - Georges
- The Colditz Story (1955) - French Colonel
- Miracle in Soho (1957) - House Surgeon (uncredited)
- I Accuse! (1958) - Judge - 2nd Dreyfus trial
- The Salvage Gang (1958) - Man in Telephone Box
- Operation Amsterdam (1959) - Diamond Merchant
- Bluebeard's Ten Honeymoons (1960) - Estate Agent
- Village of the Damned (1960) - Dr. Carlisle
- A Weekend with Lulu (1961) - Count's Butler
- The Pirates of Blood River (1962) - Silas (uncredited)
- The Phantom of the Opera (1962) - Weaver
- The Human Jungle
- Five Have a Mystery to Solve (1964) - Sir Hugo Blaize
- Masquerade (1965) - Gustave
- Chimes at Midnight (1965)
- The Devil Rides Out (1968) - Max (uncredited)
