= Victor Brooks (actor) =

English actor (1918–2000)

- in The Brides of Dracula (1960)
- Born: Victor Ronald Brooks; 11 November 1918; Woolwich, London, England
- Died: 19 January 2000 (aged 81); Dorset, England, UK
- Years active: 1956–1994

Victor Brooks (11 November 1918 – 19 January 2000) was an English film and television actor.

He was known for his silver screen portrayals of police officers, such as in British thrillers Cover Girl Killer (1959), Witchcraft (1964), and Devils of Darkness (1965). His most notable roles were in The Brides of Dracula (1960), Billy Budd (1962) and Goldfinger (1964). On television, he co-hosted eight of the 32 episodes of the 1964 magazine programme Open House. He was also noted for playing pipe-smoking authority figures in crime series like Dixon of Dock Green, Gideon's Way, Detective, Z Cars and Crown Court. He also appeared in the television series Raffles in the recurring role of the Albany porter. In 1961, he narrated the 15-minute instructional short The Warden, His Duties and Training,

In July 1970 he appeared on theatre stage opposite Alec Guinness in the Bridget Boland play Time Out of Mind at the Yvonne Arnaud Theatre, Guildford.

== Selected filmography ==
Film

- The Hostage (1956) – Inspector Clifford
- These Dangerous Years (1957)
- No Time for Tears (1957) – Mr. Harris
- The Scamp (1957) – Inspector Birch
- The Birthday Present (1957) – 2nd Reception Officer (uncredited)
- The One That Got Away (1957) – Police Sergeant (uncredited)
- Innocent Sinners (1958) – Inspector Russell (uncredited)
- The Moonraker (1958) – Blacksmith
- The Long Knife (1958) – Supt Leigh
- The Man Upstairs (1958) – Sergeant Collins
- Further Up the Creek (1958) – Policeman (uncredited)
- Too Many Crooks (1959) Court Usher (uncredited)
- Life in Danger – (1959) Tom Baldwin
- No Trees in the Street (1959) – Bookie's Clerk
- Whirlpool (1959) – Riverman
- Cover Girl Killer (1959) – Inspector Brunner
- The Price of Silence (1959) – Supt. Wilson
- Sapphire (1959) Police Sergeant
- The 39 Steps (1959) Policeman at Accident (uncredited)
- Jackpot (1960) – Sgt. Jacks
- The Trials of Oscar Wilde (1960) – Constable
- The Challenge (1960) – Foreman
- In the Nick (1960) – Screw Smith
- The Brides of Dracula (1960) – Hans
- Follow That Horse! (1960) – Blake
- Offbeat (1961) – Inspector Adams
- Seven Keys (1961) – Discharging Officer (uncredited)
- No My Darling Daughter (1961) – Policeman
- Victim (1961) – Detective (uncredited)
- Play It Cool (1962) – Twist Commissioner (uncredited)
- Crooks Anonymous (1962) – Police Officer
- The Road to Hong Kong (1962) – Leader's Man (uncredited)
- The Inspector (1962) – Sgt. Groninger
- The Day of the Triffids (1962) – Poiret
- The Brain (1962) – Farmer at Crash Site (uncredited)
- The Wild and the Willing (1962) – Fire Chief
- Billy Budd (1962) – Amos Leonard – First Mate, Rights of Man
- The Fast Lady (1963) – Policeman
- The Yellow Teddy Bears (1963) – George Donaghue
- Doctor in Distress (1963) – Police Constable (uncredited)
- 80,000 Suspects (1963) – Health Inspector Collins (uncredited)
- Witchcraft (1964) – Inspector Baldwin
- The Eyes of Annie Jones (1964) – Sgt Henry
- Downfall (1964) - Royd
- Goldfinger (1964) – Blacking
- Devils of Darkness (1965) – Inspector Hardwick
- The Murder Game (1965) – Rev Francis Hood
- You Must Be Joking! – Commissionaire
- Burke & Hare (1972) – Butler
- Give Us Tomorrow (1978) – Supt Ogilvie (final film role)

Television

- Sergeant Cork (1963–1964) – Yates / Sgt Dempsey
- Dixon of Dock Green (1964–1967) – Gaoler / Sgt Cox / Sgt Barrett
- Gideon's Way (1965) – Supt Ridgeway
- Z-Cars (1967–1969) – Sgt Potter / Sergeant
- Department S (1970) – Policeman
- Raffles (1977) – Albany Porter
- Hilary (1985) - Butler (final TV role)
