= Peter Graham Scott =

English film producer, director, editor and screenwriter (1923–2007)

Peter Graham Scott (27 October 1923 – 5 August 2007) was an English television and film producer, television director, film director, film editor and screenwriter. He was one of the producers and directors who shaped British television drama in its formative years and his background in film editing and directing helped to move television out of an era of studio-bound productions and towards programmes that owed more to cinema than to the stage.

== Biography ==
Scott was born in East Sheen, Surrey, but was brought up in Isleworth, Middlesex, where he attended acting classes at the Italia Conti Academy.

As a teenager after the outbreak of the Second World War, he worked in the films division of the British Ministry of Information until he was called up for military service. However, as a newly commissioned Royal Artillery officer, his service was abruptly ended by an accident while training. Once recovered, he went back to filmmaking, and by 1947 was an editor on Brighton Rock, starring a young Richard Attenborough.

In 1950, he married Mimi Martell, and they had two sons (deceased) and two daughters.

In 1984, Scott won the Royal Television Society's Sir Ambrose Fleming Award for Outstanding Contribution to Television. In 1999, he published his memoirs, British Television: An Insider's History.

Scott died in Windlesham, Surrey, on 5 August 2007.

== Filmography ==
=== Acted ===
- Young and Innocent (1937)
- Pastor Hall (1940)

=== Edited ===
- Brighton Rock (1947)
- The Perfect Woman (1949)
- Shadow of the Eagle (1950)
- The Rival of the Empress (1951)
- Radio Cab Murder (1954)
- River Beat (1954)
- The Avengers (TV series)

=== Directed ===
- Room for Two (1940) (assistant director)
- Major Barbara (assistant director)
- Kipps (1941) (assistant director)
- Panic (1948)
- Escape Route (1952)
- Our Marie (1953)
- The Hideout (1956)
- Account Rendered (1957)
- Breakout (1959)
- Devil's Bait (1959)
- The Big Day (1960)
- Captain Clegg (1962) (U.S. Night Creatures)
- Bitter Harvest (1963)
- The Cracksman (1963)
- Danger Man (7 episodes, 1960–63)
- Mister Ten Per Cent (1967)
- The Prisoner (1 episode, 1967)
- Subterfuge (1968)
- Children of the Stones (7 episodes, 1977 - also produced)
- Into The Labyrinth (21 episodes, 1981–82, also produced and co-created)

=== Produced ===
- Tales of Mystery (1961–63)
- Father Came Too! (1963)
- Captain Clegg
- The Troubleshooters (1965–68)
- The Borderers (1968)
- The Onedin Line (1971–80)
- The Curse of King Tut's Tomb (1980)
- Quiller (1975)
- Kidnapped (1978)
- Into the Labyrinth (1981–82)
- Jamaica Inn (1983)
- The Master of Ballantrae (1984)
- Arch of Triumph (1984)
- Jenny's War (1985)
- The Canterville Ghost

== Sources ==
- "Peter Graham Scott"The Independent on Sunday, 2007-08-21. Retrieved 2007-10-20
- Peter Graham Scott at IMDb
