= Godfrey Winn =

English journalist (1906–1971)

Godfrey Herbert Winn (15 October 1906 – 19 June 1971) was an English journalist known as a columnist, and also a writer and actor.

== Biography ==
Born in Kings Norton, Worcestershire, he attended King Edward's School, Birmingham. His career as a theatre actor began as a boy at the Haymarket Theatre and he appeared in many plays and films. He went on to write a number of novels and biographical works, and became a star columnist for the Daily Mirror and the Sunday Express newspapers, where he wrote "Dear Abby" articles for lovelorn women. Journalists nicknamed him 'Winifred God' because of his popularity with women readers. Winn was gay and never married.

In 1939, Winn was the first British war correspondent to cross the Maginot Line. He served as a Royal Navy able seaman, during the Second World War, training at HMS Ganges and becoming a CW (Commission Candidate Wartime) before injury led to his medical discharge. His book 'Home From Sea' published in 1943 recounts his life in the Royal Navy. Another book, PQ17, was an account of his experiences, as a journalist, on Convoy PQ 17 during the Second World War. After the war, he wrote numerous books and magazine articles, and appeared on radio and television as well as in films. He frequently compered the BBC Radio show Housewives' Choice, with David Jacobs, from the early 1950s to the mid 1960s. He was a friend of W. Somerset Maugham and it is said that the character George Potter in Maugham's 1941 book Strictly Personal was based on him.

He was the subject of This Is Your Life in 1961 when he was surprised by Eamonn Andrews

Winn died from a heart attack at the age of 64, while playing tennis at home in Brighton.

== Bibliography ==
- Dreams Fade (1928)
- Squirrel's Cage (1929)
- The Unequal Conflict
- Fly Away, Youth
- Communion on Earth
- I May Be Wrong
- Personality Parade
- A Month of Sundays
- For My Friends
- On Going to the Wars
- The Hour Before the Dawn
- The Kind of People We Are
- Scrapbook of the War
- Home from the Sea (1944)
- Scrapbook of Victory
- P.Q.17
- This Fair Country
- Going My Way
- The Bend of the River
- The Younger Sister (Biography)
- The Younger Queen (Biography)
- The Queen's Countrywoman (Biography)
- One Man's Dog (Biography)
- The Quest For Healing (Biography)
- Personal Pages (Biography)
- Infirm Glory (Volume 1 of his Autobiography).
- The Positive Hour (Volume 2 of his Autobiography)
- Here Is My Space (Volume 3 of his Autobiography)

== Filmography ==
Year	Film	Role	Notes
1927	Blighty	Robin Villiers	
1961	Very Important Person	Himself	
1963	Billy Liar	Disc Jockey	
1964	The Bargee	Announcer	Voice
1966	The Great St. Trinian's Train Robbery	Truelove	
1971	Up the Chastity Belt	Archbishop of all England	(final film role)

== Record Release ==
' I Pass' b/w ' Love Shades ' (Decca F12167) 1967
