= Hunted (1952 film) =

1952 British film by Charles Crichton

Hunted (a.k.a. The Stranger In Between)
- Hunted VHS videotape cover
- Directed by: Charles Crichton
- Written by: Jack Whittingham and Michael McCarthy
- Produced by: Julian Wintle
- Starring: Dirk Bogarde; Jon Whiteley; Elizabeth Sellars; Kay Walsh
- Cinematography: Eric Cross
- Edited by: Gordon Hales; Geoffrey Muller
- Music by: Hubert Clifford
- Color process: Black and white
- Production companies: Independent Artists; British Film Makers
- Distributed by: General Film Distributors
- Release date: 17 March 1952
- Running time: 84 minutes
- Country: United Kingdom
- Language: English
- Box office: £111,000

Hunted (U.S. The Stranger In Between) is a 1952 British noir crime film directed by Charles Crichton and starring Dirk Bogarde, Jon Whiteley and Elizabeth Sellars. It was written by Jack Whittingham and Michael McCarthy and produced by Julian Wintle.

Crichton regarded it as a breakthrough film for him. "That's when I got more sure of myself," he said.

== Plot ==
Robbie, an orphaned seven-year-old boy, has been placed with harsh adoptive parents in London. Having accidentally set a small fire in the house, he fears he will receive severe punishment as he has in the past for misdemeanours, so flees into the London streets. Here, he literally runs into Chris Lloyd, who is himself on the run as he has, in the heat of passion, just killed his wife's employer, who Lloyd had discovered was having an affair with his wife. Robbie attaches himself to Lloyd, who repeatedly tries to rid himself of the boy, albeit as thoughtfully as possible. Lloyd decides to use the boy to retrieve some much needed cash from his apartment.

Thereafter, Lloyd feels compelled to bring Robbie along with him. The film follows the pair as they travel northwards towards Scotland, with the police in somewhat baffled pursuit, and charts the developing relationship between the two. Initially Lloyd regards Robbie as an unwanted inconvenience, while Robbie is wary and suspicious of Lloyd. As their journey progresses, however, the pair gradually develop a strong bond of friendship, trust and common cause. Both feel they have now have nothing to lose.

They finally reach a small Scottish fishing port, where Lloyd steals a boat and sets sail for Ireland. During the voyage Robbie falls seriously ill, and Lloyd turns the boat back to the Scottish port, where he knows the police are waiting for him.

== Cast ==
- Dirk Bogarde as Chris Lloyd
- Jon Whiteley as Robbie
- Elizabeth Sellars as Magda Lloyd
- Kay Walsh as Mrs. Sykes
- Frederick Piper as Mr. Sykes
- Julian Somers as Jack Lloyd
- Jane Aird as Mrs. Campbell
- Jack Stewart as Mr. Campbell
- Geoffrey Keen as Detective Inspector Drakin
- Douglas Blackwell as Detective Sergeant Grayson
- Leonard White as Police Station Sergeant
- Gerald Anderson as Assistant Commissioner
- Denis Webb as Chief Superintendent
- Gerald Case as Deputy Assistant Commissioner
- John Bushelle as Chief Inspector

== Production ==
The film was financed through the British Film-Makers scheme.

Jon Whiteley was cast after a friend of Charles Crichton heard him reciting "The Owl and the Pussycat" on radio on The Children's Hour. He was called in for a screen test and was cast.

Much of the film was shot on location, with three main areas being used. The early London exterior scenes were shot in the Pimlico/Victoria area, which at the time still had derelict corners showing evidence of wartime damage. The location chosen for the scenes set in the English Midlands was the area in and around Stoke-on-Trent, with its distinctive industrial skyline of factory chimneys and giant pottery kilns. The railway sequence in this section was shot on the now-defunct Potteries Loop Line, and this scene has come to be regarded as historically significant by British railway enthusiasts as it provides a very rare filmic depiction of the long-gone line in operation. Scottish filming took place in the vicinity of Portpatrick in Wigtownshire and featured the fishing boat 'Mizpah' BA-11 built by Noble of Girvan (1949).

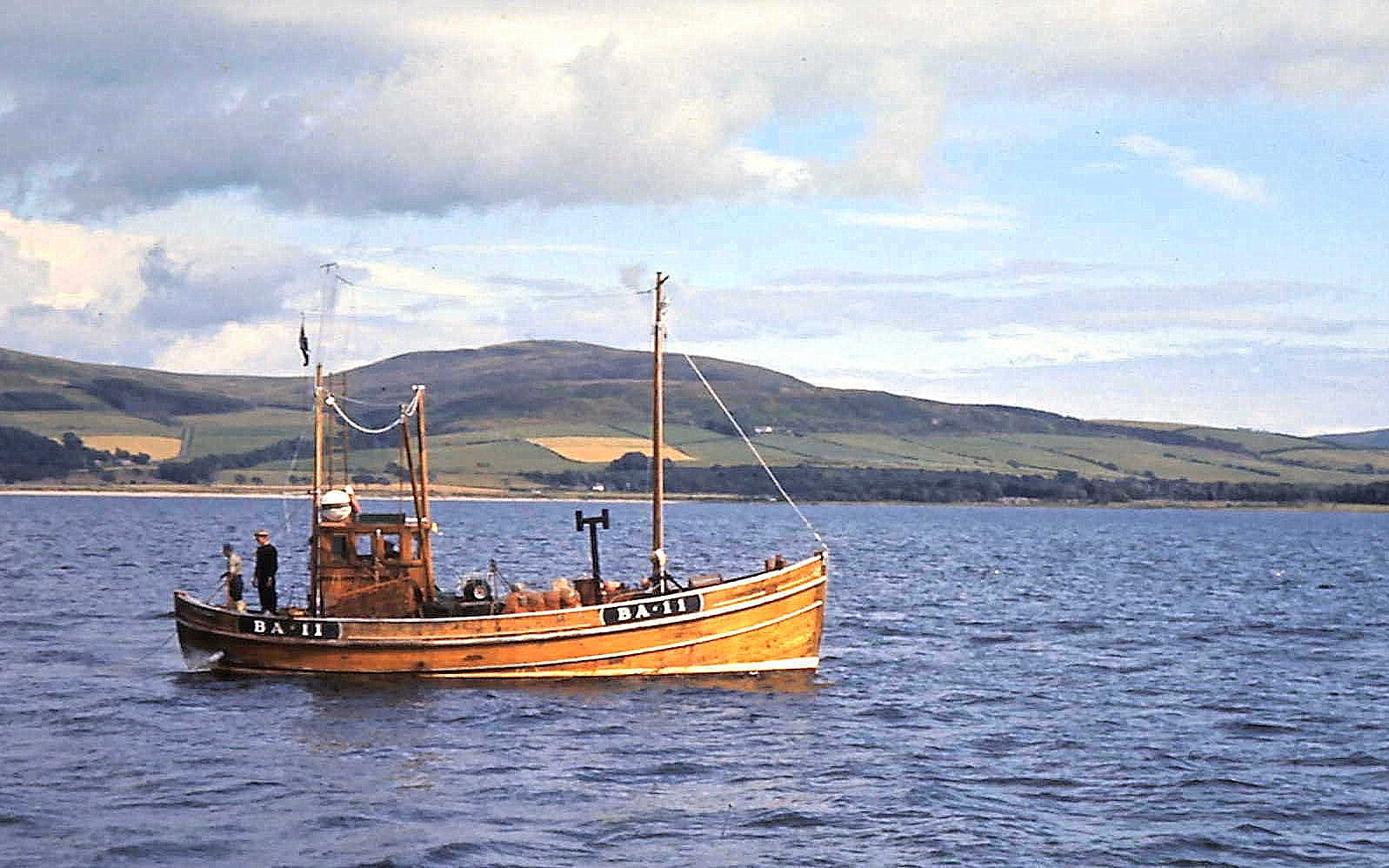
'Mizpah' BA-11 Clyde fishing boat built by Noble of Girvan in 1949

== Reception ==
The Monthly Film Bulletin wrote: "The first section of the film is well-constructed and exciting, reaching a climax in a brilliant piece of exterior shooting when the boy tries to follow Lloyd as he jumps from a railway bridge on to a slowly moving goods train below. Despite the apparent improbability of the situation, it is effectively staged. The chase across the moors starts well but is drastically over-extended. Interest wanes and the trawler scene at the end is an anti-climax, based at the key moment not upon action and movement but a perfunctory "thought-process decision" to badly-scored musical accompaniment. The return to port that follows is weak and inconclusive, despite some clever location photography of waiting men on the quayside. The topic of cruelty to children is raised (like the colour bar in Pool of London) only to be dismissed with a slick pay-off that ducks the issue entirely. Audiences cannot fail to respond to the sad figure of little Jon Whiteley and his quiet Scottish voice, but they will probably feel cheated by the basic weaknesses of story construction and feeble ending."

Kine Weekly wrote: "Its ever-changing backgrounds, beautifully composed and photographed, subtly heighten the emotional impact of its novel and tense, if slightly sprawling, tale. Jon Whiteley is a most engaging youngster, and his natural portrayal gives it all the heart interest it needs. Suspense smoothly builds up, and the climax, although a trifle inconclusive, is showmanlike. Hunted deserves to click, and unless we are very much mistaken, it will. Its sentiments and topography are essentially and refreshingly British."

Filmink called it "excellent".

== Accolades ==
The film won the Golden Leopard award at the 1952 Locarno International Film Festival.
