= The Anniversary (1968 film) =

1968 British film by Roy Ward Baker

- Theatrical release poster
- Directed by: Roy Ward Baker
- Screenplay by: Jimmy Sangster
- Based on: The Anniversary (play) by Bill MacIlwraith
- Produced by: Jimmy Sangster
- Starring: Bette Davis; Sheila Hancock
- Cinematography: Harry Waxman
- Edited by: Peter Weatherley
- Music by: Philip Martell
- Production companies: Hammer Film Productions; Seven Arts Productions
- Distributed by: Warner-Pathé Distributors (UK); 20th Century Fox (US)
- Release dates: 7 February 1968 (US); 18 February 1968 (UK)
- Running time: 95 minutes
- Country: United Kingdom
- Language: English
- Budget: $1,450,000 (estimated)
- Box office: $1,352,000 (US)

The Anniversary is a 1968 British black comedy film directed by Roy Ward Baker for Hammer Films and Seven Arts and starring Bette Davis. The screenplay, by Jimmy Sangster, was adapted from Bill MacIlwraith's 1966 play.

== Plot ==
One-eyed Mrs. Taggart is an emasculating woman whose husband, a successful building contractor, has been dead for ten years. Joining her for the traditional annual celebration of her wedding anniversary are her three sons.

Eldest son Henry is a transvestite; middle son Terry is planning to emigrate to Canada with his shrewish wife Karen and their six children; and youngest Tom, a promiscuous philanderer whose many past relationships have ended at his mother's insistence, arrives with his pregnant girlfriend Shirley in tow.

Throughout the day and evening, Mrs. Taggart does everything in her power to remind her children that it is she who controls the family finances and ultimately their futures.

== Cast ==
- Bette Davis as Mrs. Taggart
- James Cossins as Henry Taggart
- Jack Hedley as Terry Taggart
- Christian Roberts as Tom Taggart
- Sheila Hancock as Karen Taggart
- Elaine Taylor as Shirley Blair (Tom's fiancée)
- Timothy Bateson as Mr. Bird
- Arnold Diamond as Headwaiter

== Production ==
The play was first produced in the West End with Mona Washbourne as Mrs. Taggart. Bette Davis initially turned down the role in the screen adaptation, but after Jimmy Sangster, who had scripted her earlier film The Nanny (1965), rewrote the screenplay, she agreed to play the role. Sheila Hancock, Jack Hedley, and James Cossins were signed to reprise the roles they had played in the stage production. Original director Alvin Rakoff was replaced a week into filming after he clashed with Davis, who felt he "didn't have the first fundamental knowledge of making a motion picture, let alone what an actor was all about".

Rakoff, an award-winning director who had steered quite a few actors to acclaimed performances (Laurence Olivier, Peter Sellers, etc.) countered: "Not the most rational woman one can meet. But a great screen actress. She didn’t want a director. She wanted someone enthralled to her. Initially I was. But eventually..." "Talk of my making her subservient to the camera is nonsense. The script remained a wordy stage play - hardly the best basis for a film. My removal was a mixture of regret and pleasure."

Davis was required to wear self-adhesive eye patches for her role, which not only proved to be a constant irritant, but affected her equilibrium as well.

Sheila Hancock knew Davis had wanted Jill Bennett to replace her, but Bennett wasn't available. The concept of the Hollywood star system was foreign to Hancock, a veteran of the English Stage Company at the Royal Court Theatre, and she resented the fawning attention paid to Davis based on her past successes. When everyone on the lot arrived to watch the star film her first scene, Hancock was "dumbfounded ... It took me a while to realize this was the way Bette Davis was used to operating. She was a queen, after all."

The film was shot at the Elstree Studios in Hertfordshire. Its estimated budget was $1,450,000. It grossed $1,352,000 in the United States alone.

== Reception ==
=== Critical reception ===
The British premiere was held at the Rialto cinema in London on 11 February 1968.

In her review in The New York Times, Renata Adler said the film "is not a distinguished example of the Terrifying Older Actress Filicidal Mummy genre, but it isn't too heavy. And the genre isn't that distinguished after all."

TV Guide rates the film three out of a possible four stars and comments, "Davis is great, but the film suffers from the staginess of the play on which it was based."

=== Box office ===
According to Fox records the film grossed $1,450,000 in U.S. box office sales.
