= The Big Day (1960 film) =

1960 British film by Peter Graham Scott

- Lobby card, featuring Donald Pleasence and Andrée Melly
- Directed by: Peter Graham Scott
- Written by: Bill MacIlwraith
- Produced by: Arthur Alcott; Julian Wintle
- Starring: Donald Pleasence; Andrée Melly; Colin Gordon
- Cinematography: Michael Reed
- Edited by: Peter Taylor
- Music by: Clifton Parker
- Production company: Independent Artists
- Distributed by: Bryanston Films (UK)
- Release date: July 1960 (UK)
- Running time: 55 minutes
- Country: United Kingdom
- Language: English
- Budget: £22,300

The Big Day is a 1960 black and white British "B" drama film directed by Peter Graham Scott and starring Donald Pleasence, Harry H. Corbett, Andrée Melly and Colin Gordon. It was written by Bill MacIlwraith and produced by Arthur Alcott and Julian Wintle for Independent Artists.

== Plot ==
Company boss George Baker is seeking to appoint a new director. Three employees are candidates: Accounts Manager Victor Partridge, Transport Manager Harry Jackson and Sales Manager Mr Selkirk.

Partridge is married and having an affair with his young secretary Nina. The affair is leaked to the boss to ruin his chances of promotion. Jackson has been filing fake driver records and this too is exposed. Selkirk seems the likely choice for the directorship but Baker considers him too ruthless.

In a surprise move, Partridge is appointed, who Baker considers reliably dull. But Partridge finds his new job a poisoned chalice. Baker has ordered him to sack Nina, and he realises he must work much harder for little more than his name on the company notepaper.

== Cast ==
- Donald Pleasence as Victor Partridge
- Andrée Melly as Nina Wentworth
- Colin Gordon as George Baker
- Harry H. Corbett as Harry Jackson
- William Franklyn as Mr. T. Selkirk
- Susan Shaw as Phyllis Selkirk
- Molly Urquhart as Mrs. Deeping
- Betty Marsden as Mabel Jackson
- Freda Bamford as Betty Partridge
- Marianne Stone as Madge Delaney
- Roddy McMillan as Bob
- Timothy Bateson as clerk
- Anthony Bate as driver
- Sabina Franklyn as baby (uncredited, daughter of William Franklyn)
- Derek Briggs as mechanic

== Reception ==
The Monthly Film Bulletin wrote: "Bitterly real and with an outstanding performance by Donald Pleasence, together with one or two sardonically characterised supporting roles, this Bryanston picture achieves something most distinctive in the realm of British second feature production. The idea is simple, but Macllwraith's tight and sinewy screenplay heightens into a serious exposé of manners and morals ay confines of a closed little society. Effectively handled in every department, directed with punch by Peter Graham Scott, the film is particularly memorable for the mockery and irony of its ending."

Kine Weekly wrote: "Business drama, containing a subtle feminine interest. The hand-picked cast and resourceful director spin the tough, yet pliable, threads into holding and compact screen fare. Very good British "support". ... Closely knit tale, popular team, skilful treatment, sharp dialogue, handy footage and quota ticket".

Picture Show wrote: "Tight, tense little drama ... it's brilliantly acted, particularly by Donald Pleasence. There's no one who can play a nervous, small-minded man better than he. Excellent supporting feature.

The Irish Times described the film as "a prime example of how one can make a good film on a small budget. ... It has no heroes and no happy ending but it holds the interest throughout and is well acted from start to finish. It can be recommended to anyone who is tired of the old trite situations and triter dialogue."

Chibnall & McFarlane write in The British 'B' Film that the film "opens on a moment of erotic intensity unusual at any level of British film-making at the time".
