= The Fast Lady =

1962 British film by Ken Annakin

- Original film poster
- Directed by: Ken Annakin
- Written by: Henry Blyth; Jack Davies
- Based on: book by Keble Howard
- Produced by: Leslie Parkyn; Julian Wintle
- Starring: James Robertson Justice; Leslie Phillips; Stanley Baxter; Kathleen Harrison; Julie Christie
- Cinematography: Reginald H. Wyer
- Edited by: Ralph Sheldon
- Music by: Norrie Paramor
- Production company: Independent Artists
- Distributed by: The Rank Organisation (UK); Continental Distributing (US)
- Release date: December 1962 (London West End)
- Running time: 95 min
- Country: United Kingdom
- Language: English

The Fast Lady is a 1962 British comedy film, directed by Ken Annakin and starring James Robertson Justice, Leslie Phillips, Stanley Baxter, Kathleen Harrison, and Julie Christie. The screenplay was by Henry Blyth and Jack Davies, based on the 1925 novel The Fast Lady by Keble Howard. It was the third in a trilogy of comedies written by Jack Davies that Annakin made for Independent Artists.

Don Sharp directed second unit. "The Fast Lady" is the name of a vintage Bentley.

A loose sequel, Father Came Too!, was released in February 1964.

== Plot ==
Murdoch Troon is a Scot living and working for a local government authority in South London. A shy young man, his main excitement comes from cycling. After he is forced off the road by a car driver, he tracks down the owner, and finds he is Commander Charles Chingford, the owner of a sports car distributorship.

Chingford reluctantly pays for the damage to Murdoch's cycle, but more significantly, Murdoch meets Claire, Chingford's beautiful blonde daughter, and is smitten with her. She tells him she loves sports cars and would love to have one but "her great dictator" (meaning her father) will not allow it. Despite being unable to drive, Murdoch is talked into buying a car to impress her by his friend and fellow lodger, Freddie Fox, a used car salesman and serial cad. Freddie sees a chance to ingratiate himself with Chingford and also to sell Murdoch a car. The car is a 1927 vintage Bentley 4½ Litre Red Label Speed model, painted in British Racing Green and named "The Fast Lady".

Murdoch has his first driving lesson in a less exciting car, an Austin A40 Farina, which proves to be a comedy of disasters with nervous instructor Wentworth. Freddie then makes a deal with Murdoch and offers to teach him, but the results are equally disastrous.

Unwilling to give up, and determined to prove his love for Claire, Murdoch bets her father that he can drive the car. An experienced racing driver, Chingford is convinced that Murdoch has no hope of achieving this — and bets him that he cannot. Murdoch takes Chingford for a drive in the Bentley and loses the bet. But the tables are turned when Chingford loses Murdoch's counter-bet that Chingford cannot drive back home in less than 30 minutes. He then reluctantly allows Claire to go out with Murdoch in the car.

The day comes for Murdoch's driving test. Freddie has set him up with a 'bent' examiner, but Murdoch draws the 'wrong' examiner, Bodley. As the test comes to an end, and Bodley is almost certainly going to fail Murdoch, the car is commandeered by police to chase a Jaguar car driven by escaping bank robbers. The high speed chase takes them through town and country, across a golf course (leaving in its wake a trail of disasters) and eventually the robbers are caught. The now furious Bodley says that Murdoch not only fails but is "banned for life", but Chingford pooh-poohs this. Rather, he so admires Murdoch's driving skill that he allows the couple to get engaged.

== Cast ==
- James Robertson Justice as Charles Chingford
- Leslie Phillips as Freddie Fox
- Stanley Baxter as Murdoch Troon
- Kathleen Harrison as Mrs. Staggers
- Julie Christie as Claire Chingford
- Eric Barker as Wentworth
- Oliver Johnston as Bulmer
- Allan Cuthbertson as Bodley
- Heidi Erich as Grunhilde
- Esma Cannon as zebra crossing lady
- Dick Emery as Shingler
- Deryck Guyler as Dr. Blake
- Victor Brooks as policeman
- Terence Alexander as policeman
- Trevor Reid as examiner
- Frankie Howerd as road workman
- Bernard Cribbins as man on stretcher
- Clive Dunn as old man
- Fred Emney as golfer
- Eddie Gray as golfer
- Bill Fraser as golfer

Graham Hill, John Surtees, Raymond Baxter and Dickie Davies have cameos in the race scene in Murdoch's dream.

== Production ==
The Fast Lady is a 1927 Bentley 4½ Litre Red Label Speed model with Vanden Plas short chassis fabric body, registration number TU5987. It was sold by a specialist dealer in 2010. In the film, Claire Chingford (Julie Christie) says The Fast Lady is a 3-litre.

A scene involving a striptease by Claire was heavily censored.

== Release ==
The film opened at the Odeon Marble Arch in London in December 1962.

== Reception ==
=== Box office ===
It was one of the 12 most popular films at the British box office in 1963.

=== Critical ===
The Monthly Film Bulletin wrote: "An attempt to please an affluent society through a brash portrayal of its current fads and fancies. Everything is here: the Twist, sentimental Scottish songs, vintage cars, the driving test, and an assortment of fashionable popsies. James Robertson Justice looks uncomfortable as a vacillating and over-fond father, knowing that his attempts to separate his daughter from a *haggis-headed halfwit" are sure to fail. Precedent demands that the boy from the wrong side of town marry the daughter of the local tycoon, and so does the banal script. Relief arrives momentarily in the shape of a chase reminiscent of the Keystone Cops, punctuated by the untimely ascent of Frankie Howerd from a manhole."

Variety wrote "A thin idea is pumped up into a reasonably brisk, amusing situation comedy, which is helped by a cast of experienced farceurs. In dialog, the pic is short on wit but there is enough slapstick fun."

The Radio Times Guide to Films gave the film 3/5 stars, writing: "Despite driving up too many B roads, this story of a civil servant (Stanley Baxter), his car (a Bentley) and the girl on whom he dotes (Julie Christie) has such a degree of fresh-faced innocence that you appreciate the film's charm rather than notice the rambling plot. This Rank movie is tackled with relish by the cast: Christie is simpering and decent, Baxter is spot-on with his "gormless comic" style and James Robertson-Justice booms throughout."

== Home media ==
The Fast Lady was issued on Region 2 DVD in the UK on 2 February 2004. A high definition restoration from the original film elements was released on DVD and Blu-ray by Network on 24 February 2020.
