= Seven Keys (film) =

1961 British film by Pat Jackson

- UK quad poster
- Directed by: Pat Jackson
- Written by: Henry Blyth; Jack Davies
- Produced by: Leslie Parkyn; Julian Wintle
- Starring: Alan Dobie; Jeannie Carson
- Cinematography: Ernest Steward
- Edited by: Lionel Selwyn
- Music by: Alan Clare
- Production company: Independent Artists
- Distributed by: Anglo-Amalgamated Film Distributors (UK)
- Release date: February 1961 (UK)
- Running time: 57 minutes
- Country: United Kingdom
- Language: English

Seven Keys is a 1961 British second feature crime thriller directed by Pat Jackson and starring Alan Dobie. The screenplay was by Jack Davies and Henry Blyth.

== Plot ==
Russell is a convict who is bequeathed a set of seven keys by a fellow prisoner. After discovering that the deceased was an embezzler who stole £20,000 that was never recovered, on his release Russell sets out to find the cash. However, he must first solve the mystery of which locks the keys fit, and run the gauntlet of the police and a number of gangsters who are after him and the money. He enlists the reluctant assistance of the embezzler's former secretary, and uncovers a blackmail scheme that explains where the money went.

== Cast ==
- Alan Dobie as Russell
- Jeannie Carson as Shirley Steele
- Delphi Lawrence as Natalie Worth
- John Carson as Norman
- John Lee as Jefferson
- Anthony Nicholls as prison governor
- Robertson Hare as Mr. Piggott
- Fabia Drake as Mrs. Piggott
- Alan White as prison warder
- Colin Gordon as Mr. Barber
- Peter Barkworth as estate agent
- Barbara Evans as Freddy's wife
- John Horsley as police Sergeant
- Jeremy Lloyd as Freddy
- Timothy Bateson as bank teller (uncredited)
- Victor Brooks as discharging officer (uncredited)
- Edward Cast as Bank Clerk (uncredited)
- Philip Locke as Norman's thug (uncredited)

== Critical reception ==
The Monthly Film Bulletin wrote: "The mechanically contrived plot gets an understated and sometimes wryly humorous treatment from director Pat Jackson. The suspense is mild at best, but the adroit playing of Alan Dobie and Jeannie Carson gives the film an air of casual nonchalance that is rather refreshing."

Kine Weekly wrote: "The picture, similar in substance and technique to the popular Edgar Wallace thrillers, tells a plausible and punchy tale. Alan Dobie thoroughly convinces as the determined and reformed Russell, Jeannie Carson and Delphi Lawrence are shrewdly cast as the matter of fact! Shirley and the conniving Natalie, and the minor players, too, register. The colourful story threads are tightly plaited against realistic backgrounds, and the love interest logically develops without unduly cushioning the rough stuff. And the ending is definitely showmanlike"

TV Guide described it as a "well-worn crime picture ...A tame entry directed by former World War II documentarian Jackson, whose later works failed to make any impact on audiences".

Britmovie wrote: "Pat Jackson, who made his name with such wartime documentaries as Western Approaches [1944], intelligently directed this ingenious low-budget crime drama."
