= Dermot Kelly (actor) =

Irish actor (1918–1980)

- Born: 15 May 1918; Enniskillen, County Fermanagh, Northern Ireland
- Died: 18 February 1980 (aged 61); Dublin, Ireland
- Occupation: Actor

Dermot Kelly (15 May 1918 – 18 February 1980) was a Northern Irish actor often in comic roles, in films and on TV. He achieved popularity as a recurring tramp character, sidekick to Arthur Haynes's vagrant, in TV's The Arthur Haynes Show in the early 1960s. Previously on stage with Dublin's Abbey Theatre, he was in the original stage and film versions of Brendan Behan's The Quare Fellow, in 1954 and 1962, respectively.

== Filmography ==
- Another Shore (1948) as Boxer
- Home is the Hero (1959) as 2nd Pub Customer
- Sally's Irish Rogue (1959) as McKeefry
- Broth of a Boy (1959) as Tim
- Breakout as O'Quinn
- Devil's Bait (1959) as Mr. Love
- Cover Girl Killer (1959) as Pop
- Crooks Anonymous (1962) as Stanley
- The Quare Fellow (1962) as Donnelly
- The Wrong Arm of the Law (1963) as Misery Martin
- Panic (1963) as Murphy
- The Yellow Rolls-Royce (1965) as Marquess of Frinton's Jockey (uncredited)
- Cup Fever (1965) as Bodger the Bootmender
- The Plank (1967) as Milkman
- Mrs. Brown, You've Got a Lovely Daughter (1968) as Con Man
- Headline Hunters (1968) as Ernie
- Subterfuge (1968) as Van Driver
- Staircase (1969) as Gravedigger
