= Bill MacIlwraith =

British dramatist and screenwriter (1928–2016)

William Pirie MacIlwraith (13 April 1928 – 9 May 2016) was a British dramatist and screenwriter.

== Biography ==
Born in London, to Scottish parents, Macllwraith trained as an actor at RADA and worked in repertory during the 1950s, performing around the country. With Tyrone Power in a production of George Bernard Shaw's The Devil's Disciple which ran for a season in London. MacIlwraith eventually concentrated on his writing career. By the early 1960s, he had begun to develop a career as a screenwriter with the short film Linda (1960), featuring Carol White, and 8 episodes of the television series, The Human Jungle (1963–64), with Herbert Lom as a Harley Street psychiatrist, among his credits.

MacIlwraith is best known for the stage play The Anniversary (1966). After first being performed at the Theatre Royal, Brighton, the play had a long run at the Duke of York's Theatre in the West End with Mona Washbourne in the lead role as the domineering mother of three sons. It was adapted into a film version released in 1968, now with Bette Davis in the central role. The Anniversary received a West End revival in 2005 with Sheila Hancock now in the lead role.

His situation comedy Two's Company (1975–79), about an American writer and her English butler, starred Elaine Strich and Donald Sinden. A later comedy series Seconds Out (1981–82), about a boxer, starred Robert Lindsay. His other television work includes plays for the Armchair Theatre series broadcast between 1970 and 1972, and episodes of Justice with Margaret Lockwood in a role as a barrister.

== Select filmography ==
- Linda (1960)
- The Big Day (1960)
- Beryl's Lot (TV, 1973–1974)
