= Sheila Raynor =

British actress (1906–1998)

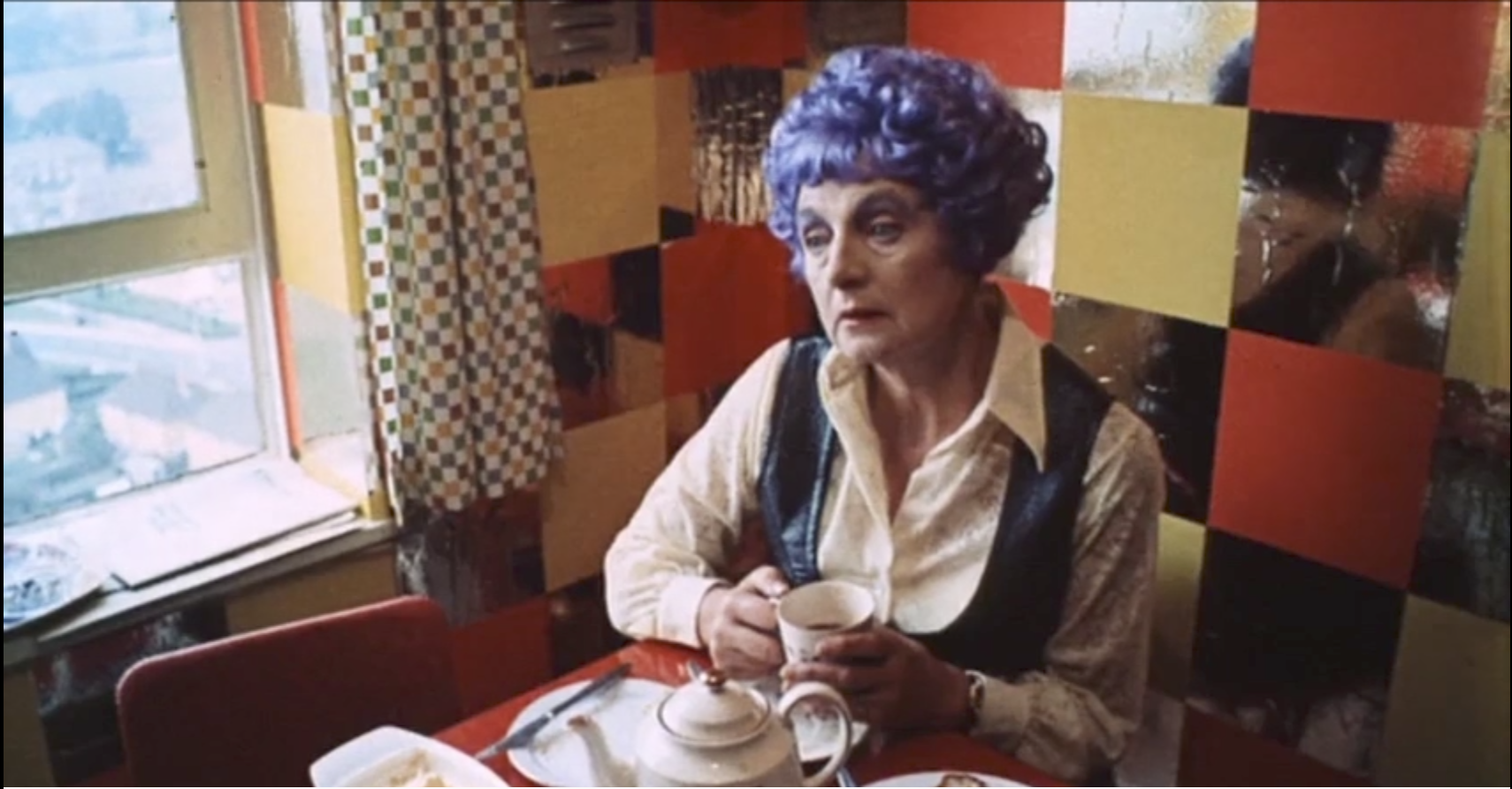
- Raynor in A Clockwork Orange (1971)
- Born: 15 March 1906; London, England
- Died: 17 February 1998 (aged 91); Gipping, Suffolk, England
- Years active: 1946–1983

Sheila Raynor (15 March 1906 – 17 February 1998) was a British actress. She appeared in Jack Clayton's adaptation of Room at the Top. One of her notable roles was that of Alex's (Malcolm McDowell) mother in A Clockwork Orange.

She was married to the actor Keith Pyott.

== Filmography ==
Year	Title	Role	Notes
1946	They Knew Mr. Knight	Agnes	
1947	The Mark of Cain	Guard	Uncredited
1949	The Huggetts Abroad	Woman with Straker	Uncredited
1949	Madness of the Heart	Nun	
1952	Wings of Danger	Nurse	Uncredited
1954	Lease of Life	Mistress of Ceremonies	
1955	Value for Money	Mrs. Hall	Uncredited
1956	Three Men in a Boat	Women at Picnic	Uncredited
1958	Violent Playground	Mrs. Catlin	
1958	The Reluctant Debutante	Broadbents' Maid	Uncredited
1959	Room at the Top	Vera	Uncredited
1960	October Moth	The Woman	
1965	Die, Monster, Die!	Miss Bailey	UK version
1971	Dulcima	Mrs. Gaskain	
1971	Man in the Wilderness	Grace's Mother	
1971	A Clockwork Orange	Mum	
1972	Demons of the Mind	Old Crone	
1975	Slade in Flame	Charlie's Mum	
1976	The Omen	Mrs. Horton	
1983	The Terence Davies Trilogy	Robert's Mother (Old Age)	(segment: Madonna and Child)
