= North Sea Hijack =

- Original UK film poster
- Directed by: Andrew V. McLaglen
- Written by: Jack Davies
- Produced by: Elliott Kastner
- Starring: Roger Moore; James Mason; Anthony Perkins; Michael Parks; David Hedison
- Cinematography: Tony Imi
- Edited by: Alan Strachan
- Music by: Michael J. Lewis
- Production company: Cinema Seven Productions
- Distributed by: Universal Pictures (through Cinema International Corporation)
- Release dates: 3 April 1980 (UK); 18 April 1980 (U.S.)
- Running time: 100 minutes
- Country: United Kingdom
- Language: English
- Box office: $2,993,772 (US only)

North Sea Hijack (released as ffolkes outside the UK and as Assault Force on US TV) is a 1980 British adventure film starring Roger Moore, James Mason, Anthony Perkins and Michael Parks. It was directed by Andrew V. McLaglen and adapted by Jack Davies from his 1979 novel Esther, Ruth and Jennifer.

This film was a vehicle for both Moore and Perkins to try to escape typecasting. Previously, Moore had been practically typecast as a womanising, happy-go-lucky playboy in such series as The Saint, The Persuaders! and as James Bond. In contrast to those parts, he portrays a bearded, eccentric, arrogant, cat-loving chauvinist with master strategist skills who does needlepoint embroidery and drinks scotch whisky immoderately.

== Plot ==
Eccentric and cat-lover counter-terrorism consultant Rufus Excalibur ffolkes is asked by Lloyd's of London to develop a contingency plan, should any of the North Sea oil installations it insures be threatened. Months later, a North Sea supply ship named Esther takes on board a group of men posing as reporters who are to visit the oil production platform Jennifer. The leader of this group, Lou Kramer, hijacks the ship; the gangsters attach limpet mines to the legs of Jennifer and its accompanying oil drilling rig, Ruth, then issue a ransom demand for £25 million to the British government. Esther's crew tries to fight back, but is thwarted by Kramer's vigilance, and two of their number end up dead.

When the British Prime Minister and her staff consult Lloyd's - where both platforms are insured - about providing the ransom, the CEO informs them about ffolkes, and after some initial hesitation he is hired to take out the terrorists and retake the platforms. ffolkes enacts his plan by traveling to Jennifer as the aide of Admiral Brindsen, who was tasked by the Prime Minister to supervise the operation. With Ruth out of Esther's sight, ffolkes first asks the admiralty to prepare a fake explosion in order to distract Kramer from blowing up Ruth and to buy them more time, then arranges for having Brindsen and himself brought aboard the supply ship to take out the terrorist leaders from within while his men board from underwater. However, Kramer distrusts ffolkes and has him removed from Esther.

With his original plan thus upset, ffolkes persuades the Prime Minister to have the ransom helicopter drop off a bomb on Esther in case his team fails to take out Kramer's gang in time. Then he approaches the ship from underwater, and despite some mishaps he manages to thwart the activation of the detonators, leaving Kramer for dead, and prevent the bomb drop on Esther. Kramer, mortally wounded, makes one last attempt to blow up Jennifer, but is stopped by ffolkes and dies. Following the successful conclusion of the mission, ffolkes is rewarded for his service with three kittens named after Esther, Ruth and Jennifer.

== Cast ==
- Roger Moore as Rufus Excalibur ffolkes (Note: ffolkes is an old English name that is correctly spelled with two lower-case f's. In the book, ffolkes corrects other people several times on this matter. See ffolkes baronets.)
- James Mason as Admiral Brindsen
- Anthony Perkins as Kramer
- Michael Parks as Shulman
- David Hedison as King
- Jack Watson as Olafsen
- George Baker as Fletcher
- Jeremy Clyde as Lord Privy Seal Tipping
- David Wood as Herring
- Faith Brook as Prime Minister
- Lea Brodie as Sanna
- Anthony Pullen Shaw as Ackerman
- Philip O'Brien as Webb
- John Westbrook as Dawnay
- Jennifer Hilary as Sarah
- John Lee as Phillips
- Sabu Kimura as Saburo (credited as Saburo Kimura)
- Eiji Kusuhara as Eiji
- David Landbury as Eriksen
- Alastair Llewellyn as Haakon
- Thane Bettany as Heyerdahl
- Eric Mason as Stallemo
- Mathias Kilroy as Olsen
- George Leech as Magnussen
- Tim Bentinck as Harris
- Sean Arnold as Schmidt

== Production ==
The film was shot near Galway Ireland and at Pinewood Studios over June–July 1979.

== Release ==
It was released as North Sea Hijack in the United Kingdom but in the United States and other English-speaking territories it was re-titled ffolkes. When it was first broadcast on American television in 1983, it was renamed Assault Force. In West Germany it was known as Sprengkommando Atlantik (lit. "Demolition Squad Atlantic").

"The film's had so many title changes I've lost count," said Moore. "But everyone seems to like the character I play."

== Reception ==
The film was a commercial disappointment and received mixed reviews. The Guardian said: "as pulp melodramas go, it's quite fun". The Los Angeles Times called it: "a vigorous but lacklustre high-seas adventure...there are lots more conferences than bravura acts of daring...even so, it is ingenious and well crafted."

Roger Ebert and Gene Siskel selected the film as one of their "dogs of the year" in a 1980 episode of Sneak Previews, with Siskel saying it "[had] no heart; just a couple of action scenes with a sex gimmick or two" and that it was purely financial in nature due to the way its stars had been selected from various nationalities so that it would receive wider interest in France and the United Kingdom. Ebert mirrored the sentiments that it was purely commercial without any inherent entertainment, and stated that it was a film he had "seen a hundred times before".

The film hold a 43% on Rotten Tomatoes based on 7 reviews. Metacritic, which uses a weighted average, assigned the film a score of 58 out of 100, based on 7 critics, indicating "mixed or average" reviews. Quentin Tarantino called the film Roger Moore's best.
