= Sony Professional Solutions =

Subsidiary of Sony

- Type: Subsidiary
- Industry: Broadcast and Media
- Founded: 1978
- Headquarters: Basingstoke, United Kingdom
- Area served: Worldwide
- Products: Cameras, Camcorders, 4k Digital Cinema, Archiving and Storage, Outside Broadcast Units, Projectors, Professional Displays, Visual Communications
- Parent: Sony
- Website: Official website

Sony Professional Solutions (SPS) is a subsidiary of Japanese multinational technology and media conglomerate Sony with main focus on professional products. These range from broadcast software and video cameras to providing Outside Broadcast Units and professional displays.

During the 2010 and 2014 FIFA World Cup, SPS was selected by FIFA as the official equipment provider. Up to 37 cameras were provided for each match including aerial cameras, cablecams, and two Ultramotion cameras. In the 2014 World Cup, the first 4k transmission of selected matches was made with the F55 Camera, which had been trialled in the 2013 Confederations Cup. Moreover, SPS delivered the world's first 4k sports screening in collaboration with Vue Entertainment at London's Westfield Vue multiplex by showing two matches of the 2014 tournament.

For the 2014 Winter Olympics Sony was given the responsibility to provide all OB Trucks for the live transmission. These were constructed at the Basingstoke office over a period of 8 months and driven to Sochi for the event. With storage for up to 24 HDC2500 cameras, accommodating 25 operators, and equipped with folding desks as well as expanding sides, these were some of the most technologically advanced OB units ever constructed.
