= Crooks Anonymous =

1962 British film by Ken Annakin

- Film poster
- Directed by: Ken Annakin
- Written by: Henry Blyth; Jack Davies
- Produced by: Leslie Parkyn; Julian Wintle
- Starring: Leslie Phillips; Stanley Baxter; Wilfrid Hyde-White; James Robertson Justice; Michael Medwin; Julie Christie
- Cinematography: Ernest Steward
- Edited by: John Trumper
- Music by: Muir Mathieson; George Martin
- Production company: Independent Artists
- Distributed by: Anglo-Amalgamated Film Distributors
- Release date: 1962
- Running time: 88 minutes
- Country: United Kingdom
- Language: English
- Budget: $400,000 or £125,000

Crooks Anonymous is a 1962 British comedy film directed by Ken Annakin, and starring Leslie Phillips and Stanley Baxter and Julie Christie, in her film debut. It was written by Henry Blyth and Jack Davies.

== Plot ==
Captain "Dandy Forsdyke" is a habitual criminal who cannot resist a tempting robbery. His gifts are for pickpocketing and safecracking. He never uses his real name, of which he's ashamed. However, he is engaged to Babette, a stripper who wants him to go straight before they marry. In love with Babette, he desperately wants to quit, but is always lured back into another crime by his associates. Babette comes across a society known as Crooks Anonymous which helps hardened thieves go straight. Founded by Mr Montague, and funded by a generous legacy, they have an excellent track record. Babette agrees to help them cure Forsdyke.

Forsdyke is picked up during a robbery by a Crooks Anonymous man, Brother Widdowes, who is disguised as a policeman, and taken to the Crooks Anonymous' headquarters. Confronted by Montague, Forsdyke admits that he wants to give up crime and marry Babette. They begin to interrogate him, and discover that he is a habitual liar, whose real name is Cox, who has never seen military service, despite his claim to be a decorated veteran.

Widdowes and Montague embark Forsdyke on a dose of punishment therapy and rehabilitation. They begin by locking him in a room filled with safes, which contain cigarettes, food, drink and a number of booby traps which make opening them a hazardous business. After a week of this torture, Forsdyke is beginning to crack. Nonetheless, he fails a test to see how much progress he has made, reverting to his old ways as soon as he is outside.

After a month of correctional therapy and reinforcement training, Forsdyke finally passes the test and is released into society. He moves into a house with Babette, gets a job working as Father Christmas in a department store and refuses an offer by one of his old pals to go back into criminality.

However, after consuming large amounts of alcohol at a Christmas party he passes out and finds himself alone in the department store, with £250,000 of takings near him in the safe. Forsdyke breaks in intending to steal the money, and then panicking at his relapse, calls Crooks Anonymous for help. They send their two top men, including Brother Widdowes, who also cave at the sight of the money. They in turn call for Senior Brother, who arrives with his Secretary.

Confronted with this unique opportunity, the five of them decide to steal the money and split it among themselves. They go to Forsdyke's house, only to be confronted by an outraged Babette, who demands they put the money back. Grudgingly they agree, as she threatens to call Scotland Yard and inform them of the burglary.

They successfully manage to return the money, unfortunately triggering an alarm which brings the night watchmen out. However, they all get safely away. Forsdyke marries Babette and as a sign of appreciation they make her a Guardian Angel of Crooks Anonymous, for keeping them all honest.

== Cast ==
- Leslie Phillips as Captain "Dandy" Forsdyke/Fred Cox
- Stanley Baxter as Brother Widdowes
- Wilfrid Hyde-White as Senior Brother Montague
- Julie Christie as Babette
- James Robertson Justice as Sir Harvey Russelrod
- Michael Medwin as Ronnie
- Pauline Jameson as Sister Prunella
- Robertson Hare as Grimsdale
- Raymond Huntley as Wagstaffe
- Dermot Kelly as Stanley
- Norman Rossington as Bert
- Harry Fowler as Woods
- Charles Lloyd-Pack as Fletcher
- Harold Goodwin as George
- Harry Locke as Fred
- Colin Gordon as drunk
- Jeremy Lloyd as M.C. at the Peekaboo Club
- Dennis Waterman as boy in park
- Bryan Coleman as Holding
- Arthur Mullard as Grogan
- Joyce Blair as Carol
- Timothy Bateson as Partrige
- John Bennett as Thomas
- Victor Brooks as police officer
- Julian Orchard as 1st jeweller
- Patrick Newell as 2nd jeweller
- Alfred Burke as Caulfield
- Arthur Lovegrove as Jones
- Cardew Robinson as Wiseman as Helicopter Brother
- Dick Emery as Reginald Cundell
- Totti Truman Taylor
- Joby Blanshard as Peekaboo doorman
- Frank Gatliff as policeman in the park
- Marianne Stone
- Jerold Wells as Sydney as large nightwatchman
- Dandy Nichols as Mrs Cundell
- David Drummond as assistant to Sir Harvey Russelrod

== Production ==
Ken Annakin prepared the film as he was recovering from polio he contracted while making The Hellions (1961). He wanted Alistair Sim, Terry-Thomas and Kenneth More to play the leads but they were too expensive so instead he used Wilfrid Hyde-White, Stanley Baxter and Leslie Phillips. The movie was one of several comedies financed by Nat Cohen at Anglo-Amalgamated.

Annakin later wrote "Despite all my directorial efforts, Crooks Anonymous remained a typical low-budget picture, making a small profit to the very insular producer and British distributors. Once again, I learned you may write the best script in the world, but if it is a comedy depending on certain type of offbeat characters, unless you cast them with the A-team, it is all a complete waste of time and effort. We accepted the ‘second team’ casting because the set-up with Independent Artists was easy, the cast were our friends, and I was exasperated with going out to seek independent financing. It is one of the regrets of my life that I did not stick out for dear old Alistair Sim, Joyce Grenfell and Terry-Thomas. If we had, I believe we would have finished up with as big a critical and commercial success, even in America, as A Fish Called Wanda [1988]."

== Critical reception ==
Monthly Film Bulletin wrote: "Though by no means blessed with subtle wit, this film does not disgrace the novel idea that supports it. The broad fun relies quite a lot on the experienced innuendo and know-how that such players as Leslie Phillips, Wilfrid Hyde White, James Robertson Justice and Michael Medwin can bring to it. But some sequences – notably the tests devised for the weaker-willed members of Crooks reveal real ingenuity and lunatic flair. For all that, though, it would hardly be more than a Carry On Crooks were it not for the superbly Goonish mimicry of Stanley Baxter, who works for Dandy's salvation in a variety of splendidly absurd disguises."

Leslie Halliwell said: "Amusingly devised and plotted minor comedy with an exceptional cast."

The Radio Times Guide to Films gave the film 2/5 stars, writing: "Playing a stripper was hardly the most auspicious start to Julie Christie's career, but she manages to cover herself in some glory in this amiable if unremarkable comedy. It's an amusing but limited idea: what else would the members of a villains' self-help group do but put their individual expertise to collective misuse? Stanley Baxter and Leslie Phillips run through their usual tricks, while Wilfrid Hyde White, James Robertson-Justice and Robertson Hare steal scenes at will."

TV Guide found "some amusing moments."

Screenonline called the film an "amusing, lightweight" comedy.
