= Jack Davies (screenwriter) =

English screenwriter (1913–1994)

- Born: John Bernard Henry Leslie Davies; 25 November 1913; Fulham, London, England
- Died: 22 June 1994 (aged 80); California, U.S.
- Occupations: Screenwriter, novelist
- Spouse: Dorothy Holding (m. 1937)
- Children: 2, including JHD

John Bernard Henry Leslie Davies (25 November 1913 – 22 June 1994) was an English screenwriter and novelist with 49 writing credits to his name as well as the 12 episodes of the 1985 TV series The Pickwick Papers. He was an associate producer for two of those credits, Crooks Anonymous and Those Magnificent Men in Their Flying Machines, receiving an Oscar nomination for Best Original Screenplay on the latter. Two of his other films were based on his original novels - Paper Tiger and North Sea Hijack.

== Personal life ==
Davies was married to Dorothy Holding from 12 June 1937 until his death on 22 June 1994. They had two children, John Howard Davies and his younger brother Legh.

== Filmography ==
(As writer, except where indicated.)

=== Films ===
- Love at Second Sight (also known as The Girl Thief) (1934)
- Mister Cinders (uncredited) (1935)
- Dance Band (1935)
- Heart's Desire (1935)
- Music Hath Charms (1936)
- Once in a Million (1936)
- A Star Fell from Heaven (1936)
- The Tenth Man (1936)
- Trouble in the Air (1948)
- Laughter in Paradise (1951)
- Curtain Up (1952)
- Top Secret (also known as Mr. Potts Goes to Moscow) (1952)
- Happy Ever After (also known as Tonight's the Night) (1954)
- Doctor at Sea (1955)
- An Alligator Named Daisy (1955)
- Jumping for Joy (1956)
- Around the World in 80 Days (as an uncredited actor only) (1956)
- Up in the World (1956)
- True as a Turtle (1957)
- High Flight (1957)
- I Only Arsked! (1958)
- The Square Peg (1958)
- The Ugly Duckling (1959)
- Invitation to Monte Carlo (documentary; also known as Love in Monaco) (1959)
- Don't Panic Chaps! (1959)
- Follow a Star (1959)
- It Started in Naples (1960)
- The Bulldog Breed (1960)
- Seven Keys (1961)
- Very Important Person (also known as A Coming-Out Party) (1961)
- Nearly a Nasty Accident (1961)
- Crooks Anonymous (also as an associate producer) (1962)
- On the Beat (1962)
- The Fast Lady (1962)
- A Stitch in Time (1963)
- Father Came Too! (1963)
- The Cavern (1964)
- Those Magnificent Men in Their Flying Machines (also as an associate producer) (1965)
- The Early Bird (1965)
- Doctor in Clover (also known as Carnaby, M.D.) (1966)
- Gambit (1966)
- Monte Carlo or Bust! (also known as Those Daring Young Men in Their Jaunty Jalopies) (1969)
- Some Will, Some Won't (1970)
- Doctor in Trouble (1970)
- Paper Tiger (1975)
- North Sea Hijack (1979)

=== Television ===
- Man of the World (2 episodes: "The Sentimental Agent" and "Double Exposure" (1962–63)
- The Sentimental Agent (1 episode: "The Scroll of Islam") (1963)
- The Poppy is Also a Flower (TV film) (1966)
- The Pickwick Papers (12 episodes) (1985)

== Bibliography ==
- Paper Tiger (1974), ISBN 978-0-491-01631-5; film adaptation: Paper Tiger
- Le Hold Up (1977), ISBN 978-0-491-02020-6.
- Esther, Ruth, and Jennifer (1979), ISBN 978-0-491-02107-4; film adaptation: North Sea Hijack
