= Tony Tanner =

British actor (1932–2020)

- Born: 27 July 1932; Hillingdon, Middlesex, England
- Died: 8 September 2020 (aged 88); Los Angeles, California, U.S.
- Occupations: actor, director, singer, choreographer, playwright, lyricist
- Years active: 1953–2020

Tony Tanner (27 July 1932 – 8 September 2020) was a British stage, film and television actor and a Tony-nominated theatre director and choreographer.

== Career ==
=== Training and early career ===
Tanner graduated from the Webber Douglas Academy of Dramatic Art with the Douglas Cup, awarded him by Margaret Rutherford. He spent five years in northern repertory companies, playing everything from Saint Peter to the front end of a cow in a British pantomime.

=== Acting career ===
Intimate revues in West End of London brought Tanner some notoriety, including an appearance in a sketch by then-unknown Harold Pinter. Later Tanner played the patsy in The Birthday Party, opposite Pinter himself, by this time known to everybody. In 1964, he starred in Strictly for the Birds. He made numerous appearances in plays and variety shows on British television, including a stint as Puck in A Midsummer Night's Dream, opposite Benny Hill's Bottom.

All of this culminated in the role of Littlechap in Stop the World – I Want to Get Off in London's West End, taking over for author Anthony Newley. He played the same role in Warner Brothers' film version of the show.

Tanner went to America to assume the lead role in Half a Sixpence on Broadway, and remained in the U.S. Two more starring roles on Broadway followed: in No Sex Please, We're British opposite Maureen O'Sullivan, and Sherlock Holmes guest starring with the Royal Shakespeare Company.

Tanner played Iago to Robert Guillaume's Othello at the National Sylvan Theater. He had many appearances with top opera companies in the comic roles in Gilbert and Sullivan operas. Tanner's original one-man show Charlatan, portraying the Ballets Russes founder Sergei Diaghilev, was the hit of the New York International Fringe Festival, and went on to the York Theatre Royal and London's King's Head Theatre in 2010.

=== Directing career ===
As a director, Tanner staged and choreographed five shows on Broadway – including Joseph and the Amazing Technicolor Dreamcoat, for which he received Best Director and Best Choreographer Tony Award nominations. His 1981 production of A Taste of Honey starring Amanda Plummer was nominated for a Tony Award for Best Revival in the same season. Tanner directed a number of Off-Broadway plays as well.

Tanner had a theatre company in Los Angeles to present his own written works.

== Personal life ==
Tanner was with his partner and eventual husband, Henry Selvitelle, for 50 years.

He died at his home in Los Angeles, California in September 2020. He was 88.
