= Unearthly Stranger =

1963 British film by John Krish

- Australian film poster
- Directed by: John Krish
- Written by: Rex Carlton
- Story by: Jeffrey Stone
- Produced by: Albert Fennell
- Starring: John Neville; Philip Stone; Gabriella Licudi; Patrick Newell
- Cinematography: Reg Wyer
- Edited by: Tom Priestley
- Music by: Edward Williams
- Color process: Black and white
- Production company: Independent Artists
- Distributed by: Anglo-Amalgamated
- Release date: 12 September 1963 (London)
- Running time: 78 minutes
- Country: United Kingdom
- Language: English

Unearthly Stranger (also known as Beyond the Stars) is a 1963 British 'B' science fiction horror film directed by John Krish and starring John Neville, Philip Stone, Gabriella Licudi and Patrick Newell. It was written by Rex Carlton based on an idea by Jeffrey Stone. It was released in the UK by Independent Artists; its US release was in April 1964.

== Plot ==
Dr Mark Davidson, the narrator, is in fear for his life. His predecessor died under mysterious circumstances just after making a major breakthrough. The cause of death ("an explosion inside his brain") is being withheld by Secret Service agent Major Clarke. The scientists are working on a project involving spaceflight by the power of mental concentration.

Davidson has a new Swiss wife, Julie, in whom Clarke takes an interest. Julie has a number of unusual characteristics, such as sleeping with her eyes open, never blinking and having no pulse, which makes her husband suspect she is an alien. She also frightens children and can handle very hot objects with her bare hands. After frightening a whole schoolyard of children, though, it emerges she can cry, though the tears burn her cheeks. Clarke does a background check and finds she never existed before her life with the doctor. As a precaution, Davidson is relieved of his lab duties. With nothing else to do he works on the problem his predecessor had figured out. He is able to recover the lost formula. For security reasons, Clarke confiscates the notes but is struck dead in the same mysterious way.

Eventually, Julie confesses that she is an alien sent to kill her husband and that she must leave because she has failed, as she has fallen in love with him. Despite his pleas, she vanishes, leaving only an empty dress. He rushes into his office and makes the tape which narrates the film, warning that aliens want to prevent the breakthrough. He is then interrupted by his secretary, who announces she is also an alien and she is there to finish the assignment. A scuffle ensues and, her concentration threatened, she falls backwards out of a window but only an empty dress lands on the pavement. The scientists rush downstairs and are quietly surrounded by a crowd of grim-visaged women, all of whom seem to be aliens.

== Cast ==
- John Neville as Dr. Mark Davidson
- Philip Stone as Professor John Lancaster
- Gabriella Licudi as Julie Davidson
- Patrick Newell as Major Clarke
- Jean Marsh as Miss Ballard
- Warren Mitchell as Professor Geoffrey D. Munro

== Critical reception ==
The Monthly Film Bulletin wrote: "Oddly unheralded by producers and distributors alike, Unearthly Stranger is in fact the best British SF-film since Wolf Rilla's Village of the Damned. One can pick holes in the script – the officially unqueried substitution of bricks for the corpse in Munro's coffin is one of them; but in the long run ingenuity and suspense pay off handsomely. The climax in particular is as satisfying as it is bleak. Julie's abnormality is eerily conveyed in shots of her tear-stained cheeks, furrowed as if by acid, and in little things like her imperviousness to heat as she lifts a red-hot casserole from the oven with her bare hands. An unfamiliar cast is distinguished by Patrick Newell's bluff and sinister callousness as Clarke, and by John Neville's meticulous and overwrought hero. John Krish whose first feature this is, directs with pace, flexibility and imagination."

Variety wrote: "Rex Carlton's screenplay takes place almost entirely within the confines of the offices of a space-connected research project. This presented some cinematic obstacles but director John Krish ... kept his small cast on the move within the limited area, cutting to occasional outside scenes for a change of pace. He is also helped tremendously by the ability of his three major actors to handle pseudoscientific dialogue in a manner that makes it both interesting and dramatic. ... Shakespearean actor John Neville, who could have understandably coasted through this admittedly negligible role, gives it his complete attention ... On a par with Neville is Patrick Newell, particularly, as a deceptively jovial but suspicious security chief ... and Philip Stone as Neville's fellow scientist in the project, treated as the cold-blooded, "no funny stuff" counterpart of Neville's imaginative and romantic part."

In Offbeat: British Cinema's Curiosities, Obscurities and Forgotten Items, Phll Tonge wrote: "Unearthly Stranger is a very odd but rewarding experience. It's shot on tuppence ha'penny in a rather staid television style ... Of course this is nit-picking. John Krish knows how to do 'Dutch' angles for when Davidson (John Neville) is running through the streets of London, and he knows the best way to shoot a spiral staircase, looking down from on high to get that concentric effect. He also has a field day getting the lighting to turn the good-looking Neville into a pointy-faced freak ... Patrick Newell's performance as Major Clark is nothing short of outrageous. It's so fruity you could make jam out of it.

Unearthly Stranger was selected by the film historians Steve Chibnall and Brian McFarlane as one of the 15 most meritorious British B films made between World War II and 1970. "Although Unearthly Stranger appears to draw attention to the performance of femininity, it is male society that is the real object of scrutiny," they say, describing it as "a highly effective fable" and praising its "unsettling atmosphere of dislocation and tension which disturbs our taken-for-granted assumptions about the worlds of office and home".

In British Science Fiction Cinema Chibnall writes that the film "uses the skills of [lighting cameraman Jimmy Wilson] to create an atmosphere of dislocation and tension which is unusually effective for a British low-budgeter. Unearthly Stranger is the most explicit treatment of the Otherness of women in all British SF films, a male-voiced I Married a Monster from Outer Space (1958)".
