= Very Important Person (film) =

1961 British film by Ken Annakin

- Original British cinema poster
- Directed by: Ken Annakin
- Written by: Jack Davies; Henry Blyth
- Produced by: Leslie Parkyn; Julian Wintle
- Starring: James Robertson Justice; Leslie Phillips; Stanley Baxter; Eric Sykes; Richard Wattis; Godfrey Winn
- Cinematography: Ernest Steward
- Edited by: Ralph Sheldon
- Music by: Reg Owen
- Production company: Independent Artists
- Distributed by: The Rank Organisation (UK); Union Film Distributors (US)
- Release dates: 20 April 1961 (UK); 30 July 1962 (US)
- Running time: 98 min.
- Country: United Kingdom
- Language: English

Very Important Person (U.S. title: A Coming Out Party) is a 1961 British comedy film directed by Ken Annakin and written by Jack Davies and Henry Blyth. The cast includes several well-known British comedy and character actors, including James Robertson Justice, Stanley Baxter in a dual role as dour Scottish prisoner Jock Everett and German prisoner-of-war camp officer Major Stampfel, Eric Sykes, John Le Mesurier, Leslie Phillips and Richard Wattis.

The film is the first collaboration of James Robertson Justice, Leslie Phillips and Stanley Baxter, who worked together in three other films.

== Plot ==
Sir Ernest Pease, a brilliant but acerbic scientist, is the subject of a television programme based on This Is Your Life during which he is re-united with past acquaintances. He does not remember the senior British Army officer at all. A flashback ensues.

In 1942, Pease is in charge of very important aircraft research during the Second World War. He needs to take a trip on a bomber to gain first-hand knowledge of the environment under which his special equipment is to be used. However, no one must know who he is. He goes as Lieutenant Farrow, a Royal Navy public relations officer. The bomber is hit over Germany and, ignoring a crewman's warning, Pease is sucked out through a hole in the side of the aeroplane, but parachutes safely to the ground.

He is captured and sent to a prisoner of war camp mostly occupied by Royal Air Force officers. His excellent command of German causes him to be suspected of being a spy, but when his real identity becomes known to Group Captain Travers, the senior British officer, he informs the men in his hut of his importance and that his escape is a top priority. Among Pease's roommates are Jimmy Cooper, "Jock" Everett, and "Bonzo" Baines.

Pease is offered an opportunity to escape through a tunnel with two other men. However, he expects the pair to be easily recaptured (which does in fact occur). He instead plans to go into hiding after a fake escape attempt. He presumes the Germans will search for him for two weeks then presume he has got away, at which point they will step down the search and he can more safely escape.

When the Germans eventually assume he has succeeded in getting away and lose interest, he will walk out of the camp, disguised as one of three visiting Swiss Red Cross observers, along with Cooper and Baines (which has echoes of a real Second World War escape from Spangenberg by RAF officers Dominic Bruce, the "Medium Sized Man" of Colditz fame; Pete Tunstall; and "Useless" Eustace Newborn, who escaped dressed as Swiss Red Cross doctors). Crucial to the plan is that Everett looks like the camp Lager (compound) officer, Major Stampfel (even though Everett describes him as "hideously ugly"). He must impersonate Stampfel, as he will be escorting the delegation. The escape committee, headed by Wing Commander Piggott, are very dissatisfied with Pease's plan, but Pease is determined to see it through. The plan nearly comes unstuck at the last moment, when another prisoner, "Grassy" Green, is revealed as an astute undercover Luftwaffe intelligence officer. He takes them at gunpoint, but mistakes Everett for Stampfel and is "dealt with". Pease, Cooper and Baines walk out of the camp and eventually make their way back home.

Returning to the television programme, Pease is reunited with Baines, now a leading designer of ladies' foundation garments; Cooper, a missionary in India; Everett, a West London undertaker; and Stampfel, who has become a popular entertainment manager at a British holiday camp.

== Cast ==
- James Robertson Justice as Sir Ernest Pease / Lt Farrow RN
- Leslie Phillips as Jimmy Cooper
- Stanley Baxter as Jock Everett / Major Stampfel
- Eric Sykes as Officer Willoughby
- Richard Wattis as Officer Woodcock
- Godfrey Winn as Himself
- Colin Gordon as Briggs
- John Le Mesurier as Piggott
- Norman Bird as Travers
- Jeremy Lloyd as Bonzo Baines
- John Forrest as Grassy Green
- Jean Cadell as TV Guest
- Peter Myers as Shaw
- Ronnie Stevens as Hankley
- Ronald Leigh-Hunt as Clynes
- Steve Plytas as Luftwaffe officer
- John Ringham as Plum Pouding
- Mark Hardy as POW
- John Huson as Air Vice-Marshal Bickerstaff
- Joseph Fürst as Luftwaffe Interrogator
- Norman Shelley as Fred Whittaker
- Brian Oulton as Wentworth
- Frederick Piper as Scientist
- Joan Haythorne as Miss Rogers
- Heidi Erich as German Fraulein
- Lesley Allen as Receptionist
- Nancy Nevinson as German Frau (uncredited)
- Derek Aylward as Entertainments Assistant (uncredited)
- Barry Lowe as Forger (uncredited)

== Inspiration ==
The escape plan, to walk out of the camp dressed as Red Cross observers, was used in real life. It was briefly mentioned in Paul Brickhill's book The Great Escape.

There were in fact two such 'Swiss Commission' escapes from German POW camps holding RAF prisoners – Oflag IX-A/H, Spangenberg, in 1941, and Oflag VI-B, Warburg, in 1942. The escape in Very Important Person is based on the latter, which was an Army–RAF joint effort, and not the one mentioned by Brickhill. Both escapes are described by Charles Rollings in his books Wire and Walls and Wire and Worse.

The film's screenplay was later made into a novelisation with the same title by John Foley, which has erroneously caused Foley to sometimes be credited as author of the novel upon which the film is based. However, it was the other way around: his novel is based on the film.

== Production ==
Ken Annakin had just made Swiss Family Robinson and was trying to make other films as a follow-up. Earl St. John had been brought the script by David Tomlinson, who John Davis of Rank hated. However St. John felt the script was very commercial made the film through a subsidiary at Beaconfield. Annakin agreed to work on the script with Jack Davies and direct.

Filming started late November 1960. Annakin said "what we want to do is look at the humour of the last war through 1960 eyes."

== Release ==
The film had its world premiere on 20 April 1961 at the Leicester Square Theatre in London's West End and went on general release in late May on Rank's second string National circuit.

== Box office ==
In April 1961 Kinematograph Weekly wrote "The critics gave the prison camp romp the glad hand, but their applause has been drowned by that of the cash customers. Very Important Person broke records at the Leicester Square Theatre over the weekend. Some 'sleeper'!"

By the end of the year the same magazine declared the film was a "money maker" at the British box office in 1961.

== Critical reception ==
The Monthly Film Bulletin wrote: "The comedy doesn't quite dare to satirise the sacrosanct schoolboy heroics of the typical British P.O.W. film. It settles instead for a few good-natured laughs at the time-wasting round that is the dismal lot of the P.O.W.; including the inevitable camp concert and the frantic tunnelling activities. A cod This Is Your Life programme, which precedes the flashback story and casts Godfrey Winn as a nervous chairman with James Robertson Justice (Pease) as the bad-tempered victim, is funny enough to survive the lukewarm treatment. But the bright idea of teaming Justice and Stanley Baxter (playing the dual roles of Stampfel and Everett) is amply rewarded. The latter's talent for mimicry is obviously operating at half-pressure, but it's still engaged to useful effect as a foil for Robertson's bombastic superiority. Between them, they lift the film out of the rut of standard British screen foolery."

The New York Times described the film as "trifling, even as modest British comedies go," and "burdened, rather than helped, by the presence of James Robertson Justice in a ponderous role," though Leslie Phillips and Stanley Baxter were found to be "particularly droll."

The Radio Times noted a "winning comedy" with "witty script", "polished playing" – "Stanley Baxter gives one of his best film performances" – and "deft comic support from Leslie Phillips, Eric Sykes and the deliciously deadpan Richard Wattis."

== Bibliography ==
- Annakin, Ken (2001). So you wanna be a director?. Tomahawk Press.
- Maltin, Leonard (1995). The Disney Films (3rd ed.). New York: Hyperion Books. ISBN 0-7868-8137-2.
