= Julian Wintle =

British film and TV producer (1913–1980)

- Born: 17 October 1913; Liverpool, Lancashire, England
- Died: 8 November 1980 (aged 67); Brighton, Sussex, England
- Occupations: Film and TV producer

Julian Wintle (1913–1980) was a British film and TV producer.

He is best remembered for his work on TV's The Avengers, where he oversaw the transition of the series to film, the introduction of Emma Peel, and the subsequent international success, in what is considered by many to be the series "classic" years (1965–1967).

Wintle was a member of the Bryanston Consortium from 1959 to 1963. For several years, in the early 1960s he was head of Beaconsfield Film Studios, and, together with Leslie Parkyn, a director of Independent Artists Ltd., which produced Lindsay Anderson's This Sporting Life (1963) among other projects.

His sons are the musician and publisher Christopher Wintle and the writer Justin Wintle. He was the subject of a biography by Anne Francis, Julian Wintle. A Memoir, London, Dukeswood, 1984. This contains an extensive filmography with many films listed for which he was executive producer.

== Health ==
Wintle suffered from haemophilia.

== Films ==
- The Dark Man (1951)
- Assassin for Hire (1951)
- Hunted (1952)
- The Sleeping Tiger (produced without credit) (1954)
- Passage Home (1955)
- High Tide at Noon (1957)
- The One that Got Away (1957)
- Breakout (1959)
- Devil's Bait (1959)
- Tiger Bay (1959) – BAFTA Award winner
- The Malpas Mystery (1960)
- Linda (1960)
- Circus of Horrors (1960)
- Never Let Go (1960)
- The Man in the Back Seat (1961)
- Very Important Person (1961)
- House of Mystery (1961)
- Seven Keys (1961)
- Payroll (1961)
- Night of the Eagle (1962)
- Play it Cool (1962)
- Waltz of the Toreadors (1962)
- Crooks Anonymous (1962)
- The Fast Lady (1962)
- Unearthly Stranger (1963)
- Father Came Too! (1963)
- Mister Jerico (1970)
- Madame Sin (1972)

== TV series ==
- The Human Jungle (1963–1964)
- The Avengers (1965–1969)
