= Reginald Wyer =

British cinematographer (1901–1970)

Reginald H. Wyer BSC (1901–1970) was a British cinematographer.

Among his notable early credits were The Seventh Veil (1945) and Quartet (1948), So Long at the Fair (1950) and Four Sided Triangle (1953), the last two of which were directed by Terence Fisher. He joined Fisher again in the mid-1960s for two low-budget science fiction films: Island of Terror (1965) and Night of the Big Heat (1967).

He was often credited as "Reginald H. Wyer" or simply "Reg Wyer".

== Selected filmography ==
- The Unholy Quest (1934)
- The White Unicorn (1947)
- Tread Softly (1952)
- The Happy Family (1952)
- Never Look Back (1952)
- Carry on Nurse (1959)
- Night of the Eagle (1962)
- Unearthly Stranger (1963)
- The Informers (1963)
- Rattle of a Simple Man (1964)
- Night of the Big Heat (1967)
