= Leslie Parkyn =

British film producer

Leslie Parkyn (1918–1983) was a British film producer. He helped run Independent Artists, with Julian Wintle.

== Select credits ==
- It Started in Paradise (1952)
- The Little Kidnappers (1953)
- The Woman for Joe (1955)
- Tiger in the Smoke (1956)
- Tiger Bay (1959)
- The White Trap (1959)
- Devil's Bait (1959)
- Circus of Horrors (1960)
- Play It Cool (1962)
- The Fast Lady (1962)
- Bitter Harvest (1963)
- Father Came Too! (1963)
