= Beaconsfield Film Studios =

Film and television production facility in Buckinghamshire, England

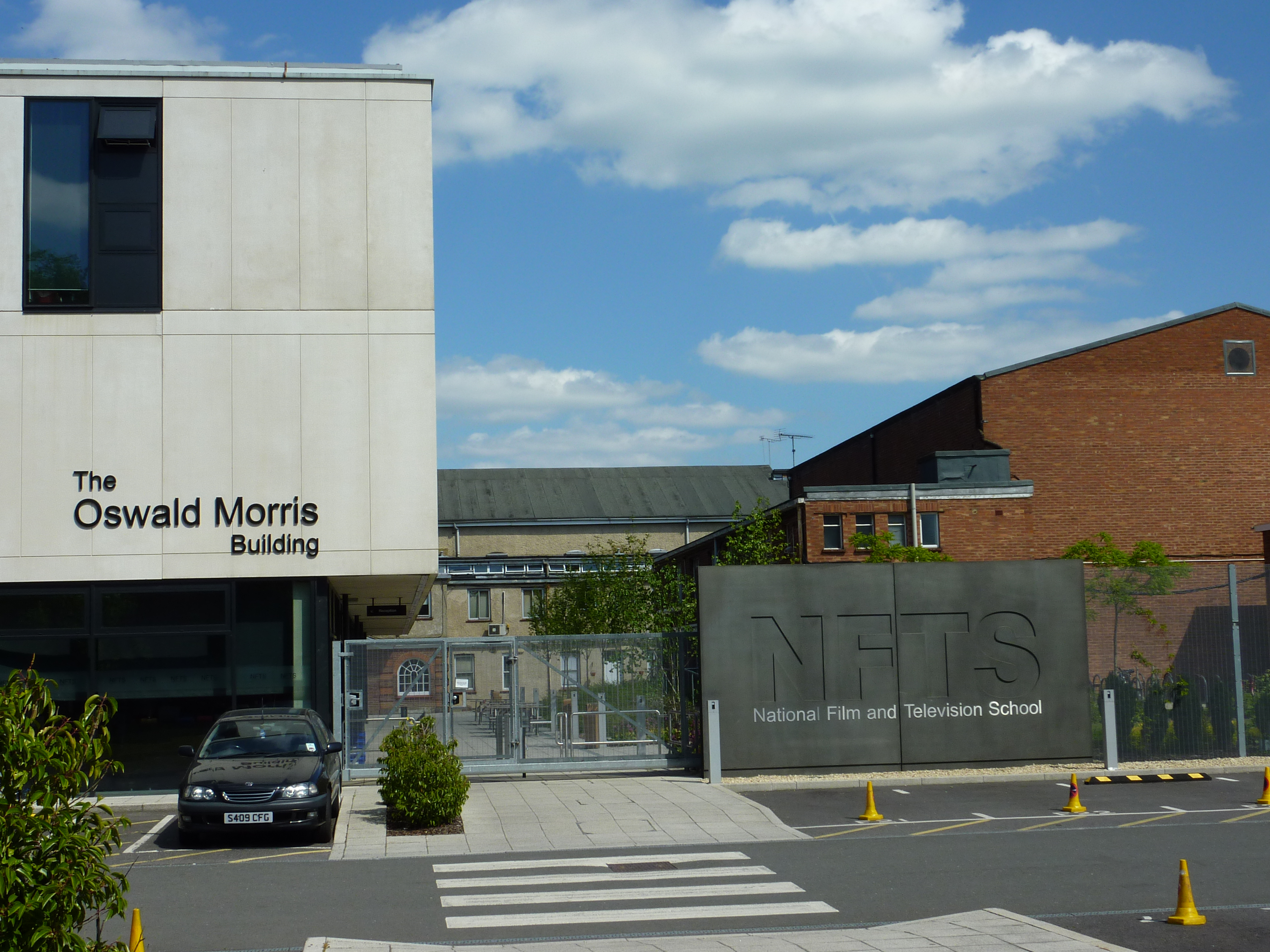
- The studios in 2011: (left to right) Oswald Morris building, original film sound stage building, TV studio building
- Interactive map of the Beaconsfield Film Studios area

General information
- Location: Station Road, Beaconsfield, Buckinghamshire, HP9 1LG, United Kingdom
- Coordinates: 51.6054°N 0.6374°W
- Opening: 1922
- Owner: National Film and Television School (1971–present)

Website
- NFTS Production Facilities

Beaconsfield Film Studios is a British television and film studio in Beaconsfield, Buckinghamshire. The studios were operational as a production site for films in 1922, and continued producing films - and, later, TV shows - until the 1960s. Britain's first talking movie was recorded there, as were films starring British actors Gracie Fields, Peter Sellers and John Mills.

Since 1971 it has been the home of the National Film and Television School, an internationally recognized postgraduate school for film and TV production, famous as the birthplace of the animated characters Wallace and Gromit.

== History ==
=== Life as a studio (1922–1970) ===
==== Construction and early years ====
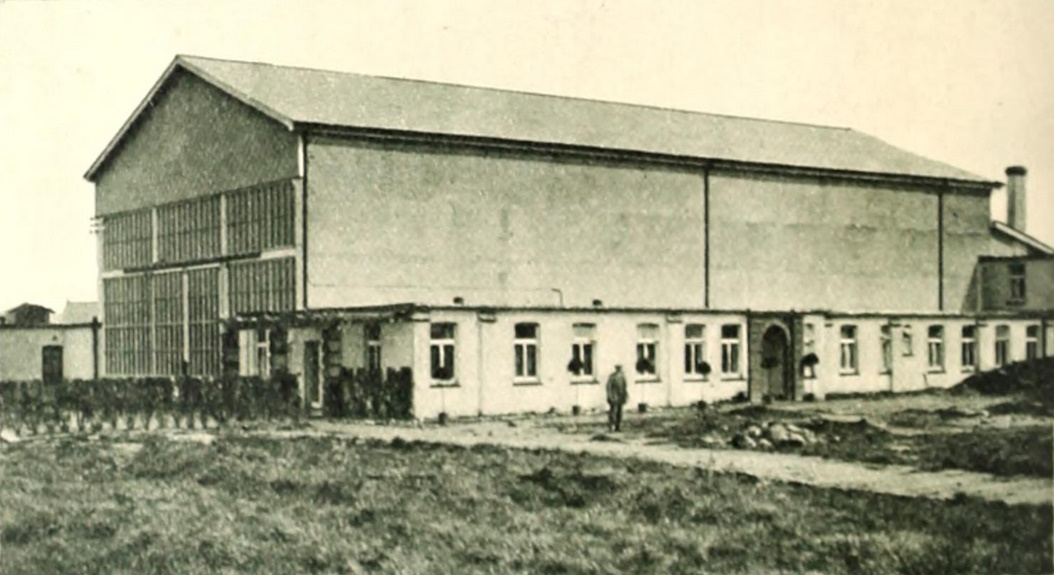
Exterior view of the George Clark Productions studio in 1923

Construction began on the studio in 1921. Producer George Clark and actor/director Guy Newall had been making films at a small studio on Ebury Street in Central London. They outgrew this and raised financing for a new, larger and more modern studio to be built in Beaconsfield.

The studio opened in 1922, and Clark and Newall made several films there such as Fox Farm. They also leased it out to independent companies to make films. The whole industry was badly hit by the Slump of 1924, and filmmaking at Beaconsfield ceased almost entirely. Clark and Newall later sold the studios to the British Lion Film Corporation.

==== British Lion Studios ====
In the late 1920s, British Lion took over the studios producing a number of Edgar Wallace adaptations. Following the conversion to sound films in the 1920s, the company largely concentrated on making quota quickies with the occasional higher-budget film.

==== Crown Film Unit ====
Following the outbreak of World War II, the GPO Film Unit became the Crown Film Unit. The Crown Film Unit was based at Beaconsfield Film Studios. Fifty-one productions are credited to the Crown Film Unit between 1940 and 1952 - when it was disbanded - although it is not known how many were actually filmed at Beaconsfield Film Studios.

Full list of Crown Film Unit productions, at IMDB

==== Anvil Film Unit ====
Former Crown Film Unit sound recordist Ken Cameron started The Anvil Film Unit in 1952 and operated out of a theatre, offices and cutting rooms at the studios. The company recorded post-synching dialogue, Foley sound effects and music with Cameron as chief music engineer and Muir Mathieson the conductor, before moving to Denham Film Studios in 1966.

=== Independent Artists Studios ===
After the Crown Film Unit was disbanded, the studios was known as Independent Artists Studios between 1958 and 1964, when it was run by the film production company Independent Artists (Production) Ltd., formed by Julian Wintle. Independent Artists made several films in these studios, including:

- Very Important Person
- The Man in the Back Seat
- House of Mystery
- Circus of Horrors

Several other films and TV shows are confirmed by IMDb as having been produced in the studios by other film production companies during that time:

- The Vicious Circle (1957), starring John Mills)
- The Battle of the Sexes (1959), starring Peter Sellers
- Payroll (1961)
- Ghost Squad (TV series, 1961–1964)
- The Wrong Arm of the Law (1963), starring Peter Sellers
- The Human Jungle (first series, 1963)
- Strictly for the Birds (1964)

=== Life as a film school (1971 onwards) ===
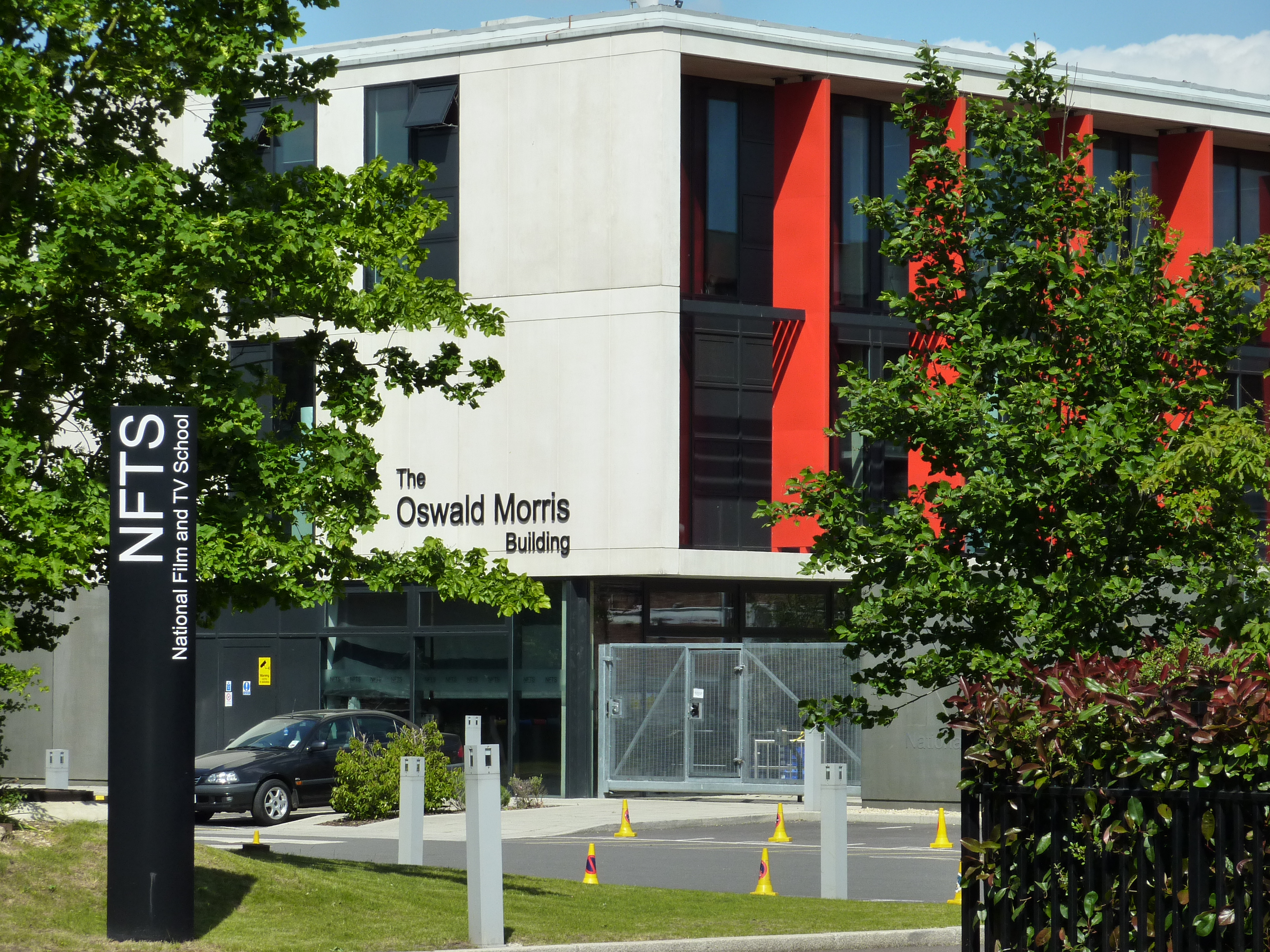
2011 image of the studios, as NFTS

The studios are now exclusively the home of the National Film and Television School, whose alumni have won numerous BAFTA awards and Oscars.

==== The National Film School (NFS) ====
The NFS was created in 1970 and in 1971 bought the studios to be its home, thanks to a loan from the Rank Organisation, producers of the Carry On film series and owners at the time of the nearby Pinewood Studios.

==== The National Film and Television School (NFTS) ====
It was renamed the National Film and Television School (NFTS) in 1982. The first Wallace and Gromit film, A Grand Day Out was started by Oscar-winning director Nick Park whilst he was a student at NFTS, and like all works created at the school, the film is credited as being the copyright of NFTS.

== Current facilities ==
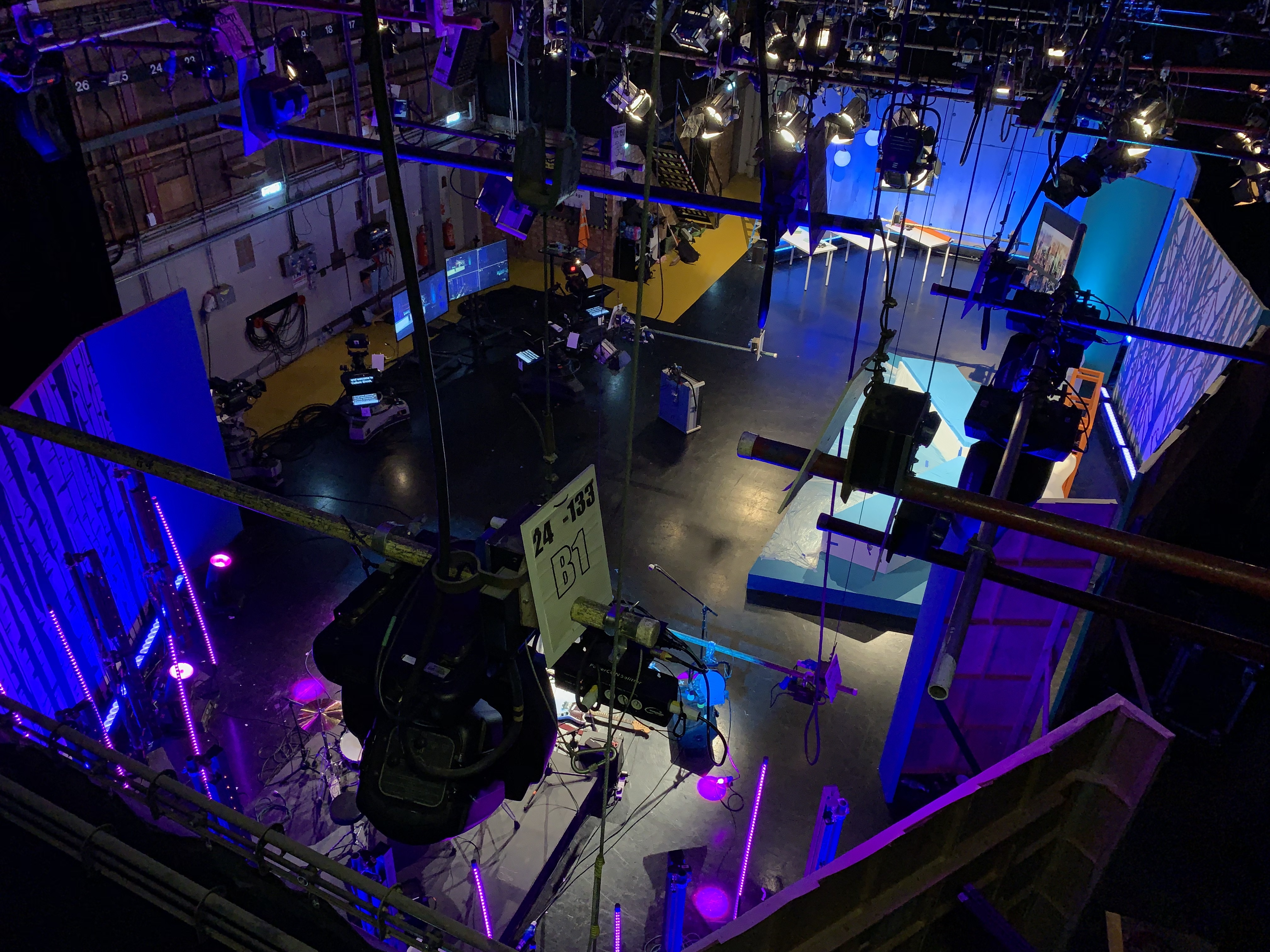
A TV show being rehearsed in the TV Studio

NFTS students still use the original 1930s sound stage and 1960s TV studio building, but other buildings have been constructed on site to improve teaching facilities.

=== Recent expansion ===
To modernise and expand the teaching and administrative space, the NFTS commissioned Glen Howells Architects to design a three-storey building (see photo). Upon its completion in 2008 it won a RIBA prize. In June 2009 it was formally named The Oswald Morris Building in honour of cinematographer Oswald Morris. It contains a 150-seat cinema which was upgraded in 2017 to support Dolby Digital and 4K DCP projection.

In 2017, an additional teaching building opened on the site of a number of yellow classrooms on the north side of the site, and it houses a new studio, edit suites, dedicated sound design suites, as well as multi-purpose teaching spaces.

The "Channel 4 Rose Building", also opened in 2017, incorporates teaching facilities, as well as an extra 60-seat cinema, café and incubation space.

The original 1960s TV studio was also upgraded to 4K capabilities with new Sony studio cameras and a high-end vision mixer, also from Sony. This was the only true-4K TV studio in the United Kingdom until Television Centre's TC1 reopened in September 2017. The sound infrastructure was also upgraded with a new Studer sound control surface capable of supporting 5.1 surround sound. This was named the Sky Studios at the NFTS studio.

=== Current stages ===
- Stage 1 (Main Stage) – 7,000 square feet (650 m^{2}) (approx.) – traditional wooden floor film stage with permanent scenic cloth
- Studio 2 (TV Studio) – 3,600 square feet (330 m^{2}) (approx.) – concrete resin floor television studio
- Stage 3 (Rehearsal Stage) – 1,050 square feet (98 m^{2}) (approx.) – traditional wooden floor film stage
- Stage 4 (Teaching Block Stage) – 900 square feet (84 m^{2}) (approx.) – resin floor multi-purpose stage
