= Starr and Company =

1958 British TV soap opera

Starr and Company is a BBC television drama series that aired in 1958. It was a soap opera, airing twice a week on Monday and Thursday. 77 episodes were made, of which only a single episode (episode 1) is known to survive.

The series was set in a buoy-making firm established by retired naval engineer Joseph Starr in the fictional town of Sullbridge in South East England.

Most of the cast were not known before or after, but there were several well-known players – Graham Crowden; Edna Doré; Edward Evans; Stratford Johns; Renny Lister; Warren Mitchell; Guy Kingsley Poynter; Arnold Ridley – either already established or who later became well-known.

The programme was broadcast live.

== Episodes ==
•	1 One Side of the Family	(31 Mar 1958)
	The first episode of a new serial.	
	Producer	Gerard Glaister
	Script	Bill Naughton
	Story associate	Sheila Hodgson; David Campton
	Designer	Richard Wilmot
	Megs Turner	Nancy Nevinson
	Gwyneth Turner	Gillian Gale
	Hughie Turner	Barry MacGregor
	Jim Turner	Philip Ray
	Harry Crane	Arnold Ridley
	First apprentice	Barry Steele
	Second apprentice	Bryan Kendrick
	Tom Turner	Brian McDermott

•	2 Talk at the Local	(3 Apr 1958)
	Producer	Gerard Glaister
	Director	Morris Barry
	Script	Bill Naughton
	Story associate	Sheila Hodgson; David Campton
	Designer	Richard Wilmot
	Megs Turner	Nancy Nevinson
	Jim Turner	Philip Ray
	Gwyneth Turner	Gillian Gale
	Tom Turner	Brian McDermott
	Steve Lacey	Harry Littlewood
	Robin Starr	Michael Murray
	Harry Crane	Arnold Ridley
	Hughie Turner	Barry MacGregor
	Joe Trimmer	George Roderick
	Rene Cremer	Katherine Parr
	Councillor Hansford	Robert Perceval
	Alec Cremer	Michael Bird
	Barman	Lee Richardson
	Tomlinson	Raymond Hodge
	Higgins	Henry Soskin
	Cummings	Robert Vahey

•	3 The Boss	(7 Apr 1958)
	Producer	Gerard Glaister
	Director	Mervyn Pinfield
	Scriptwriter	Allan Prior
	Story associate	Sheila Hodgson; David Campton
	Designer	Richard Wilmot
	Jane Starr	Deirdre Day
	Robin Starr	Michael Murray
	Mannion	Anthony Woodruff
	Mrs Ellis	Esther McPherson
	Joseph Starr	William Sherwood
	Mrs Starr	Barbara Cavan
	Bob Jason, reporter	Donald Churchill

•	4 Sunday Outing	(10 Apr 1958)
	Producer	Gerard Glaister
	Director	Morris Barry
	Scriptwriter	Bill Naughton
	Story associate	Sheila Hodgson; David Campton
	Designer	Richard Wilmot
	Hughie Turner	Barry MacGregor
	Megs Turner	Nancy Nevinson
	Jim Turner	Philip Ray
	Gwyneth Turner	Gillian Gale
	Tom Turner	Brian McDermott
	Joe Trimmer	George Roderick
	Mary Tennison	Patricia Mort

•	5 Starr's in Collision	(14 Apr 1958)
	Producer	Gerard Glaister
	Director	Mervyn R. Pinfield
	Scriptwriter	Bill Naughton
	Story associate	Sheila Hodgson; David Campton
	Designer	Richard Wilmot
	Jim Turner	Philip Ray
	Charlie, apprentice	Barry Steele
	Simpson	Maurice Durant
	Allardyce	John Forbes-Robertson
	Tom Turner	Brian McDermott
	Mary Tennison	Patricia Mort
	Lacey	Harry Littlewood
	Hazel	Anne Pichon
	Doris	Jose Read
	Mrs Childs	Betty Cooper
	Joseph Starr	William Sherwood
	Robin Starr	Michael Murray
	Mannion	Anthony Woodruff
	Mackie	George Cormack

•	6 The Dark Horse	(17 Apr 1958)
	Producer	Gerard Glaister
	Scriptwriter	Bill Naughton
	Story associate	Sheila Hodgson; David Campton
	Designer	Richard Wilmot
	Megs Turner	Nancy Nevinson
	Jim Turner	Philip Ray
	Hughie Turner	Barry MacGregor
	Tom Turner	Brian McDermott
	Gwyneth Turner	Gillian Gale
	Mary Tennison	Patricia Mort
	Harry Crane	Arnold Ridley
	Lacey	Harry Littlewood
	Doris	Jose Read
	Bob	Michael Wynne
	Anna	Joy Owen
	Charlie, apprentice	Barry Steele
	Sam, apprentice	Bryan Kendrick

•	7 Cross Purposes	(21 Apr 1958)
	Producer	Gerard Glaister
	Director	Morris Barry
	Scriptwriter	Bill Naughton
	Story associate	Sheila Hodgson; David Campton
	Designer	Austen Spriggs
	Hazel	Anne Pichon
	Doris	Jose Read
	Robin Starr	Michael Murray
	Bromley	Martin Sterndale
	Simpson	Maurice Durant
	Harry Crane	Arnold Ridley
	Jim Turner	Philip Ray
	Joseph Starr	William Sherwood
	Mrs Childs	Betty Cooper
	Lacey	Harry Littlewood
	Mannion	Anthony Woodruff
	Charlie, apprentice	Barry Steele
	Sam, apprentice	Bryan Kendrick

•	8 A Decision is Taken	(24 Apr 1958)
	Producer	Gerard Glaister
	Director	Mervyn R. Pinfield
	Script	Allan Prior
	Story associates	Sheila Hodgson; David Campton
	Designer	Austen Spriggs
	Mrs Starr	Barbara Cavan
	Ilse	Ellen Blueth
	Joseph Starr	William Sherwood
	Robin Starr	Michael Murray
	Jane Starr	Deirdre Day
	Julia Starr	Pat Ann Key

•	9 A Secret and a Meeting	(28 Apr 1958)
	Producer	Gerard Glaister
	Director	Morris Barry
	Script	Allan Prior
	Story associate	Sheila Hodgson; David Campton
	Designer	Richard Wilmot
	Hazel	Anne Pichon
	Doris	Jose Read
	Robin Starr	Michael Murray
	Tom Turner	Brian McDermott
	Allardyce	John Forbes-Robertson
	Mary Tennison	Patricia Mort
	Vera	Shane Cordell
	Mannion	Anthony Woodruff
	Simpson	Maurice Durant
	Jim Turner	Philip Ray
	Hughie Turner	Barry MacGregor
	Megs Turner	Nancy Nevinson
	Harry Crane	Arnold Ridley
	Mrs Bradley	Doris Yorke

•	10 A Debt Repaid	(1 May 1958)
	Producer	Gerard Glaister
	Director	Mervyn R. Pinfield
	Scriptwriter	Allan Prior
	Story associate	Sheila Hodgson; David Campton
	Megs Turner	Nancy Nevinson
	Mrs Bradley	Doris Yorke
	Harry Crane	Arnold Ridley
	Mr Barker	Frank Pemberton
	Ackroyd	Derek Tansley
	Mr Dodds	John Scott
	Hughie Turner	Barry MacGregor
	Anna	Joy Owen
	Mary Tennison	Patricia Mort
	Tom Turner	Brian McDermott
	Jim Turner	Philip Ray
	Gwyneth Turner	Gillian Gale

•	11 A Matter of Vanity	(5 May 1958)
	Producer	Gerard Glaister
	Scriptwriter	Allan Prior
	Story associate	Sheila Hodgson; David Campton
	Jim Turner	Philip Ray
	Harry Crane	Arnold Ridley
	Charlie	Barry Steele
	Vera	Shane Cordell
	Forbes	Glenn Williams
	Tom Turner	Brian McDermott
	Joseph Starr	William Sherwood
	Mrs Childs	Betty Cooper
	Simpson	Maurice Durant
	Robin Starr	Michael Murray
	First Guild member	Mona Bruce
	Bob Jason	Donald Churchill
	Megs Turner	Nancy Nevinson
	Mrs Starr	Barbara Cavan
	Second Guild member	Betty Hare
	Jane Starr	Deirdre Day
	Reggie Stratton	Raymond Young
	Mrs Ellis	Esther McPherson

•	12 I Love my Boss	(8 May 1958)
	Producer	Gerard Glaister
	Director	Morris Barry
	Script	Allan Prior
	Story associate	Sheila Hodgson; David Campton
	Joseph Starr	William Sherwood
	Robin Starr	Michael Murray
	Doris	Jose Read
	Hazel	Anne Pichon
	Simpson	Maurice Durant
	Mackie	George Cormack
	Rene Cremer	Katherine Parr
	Vera	Shane Cordell
	Morny	Douglas Blackwell
	Mrs Childs	Betty Cooper
	Jim Turner	Philip Ray
	Harry Crane	Arnold Ridley
	Tom Turner	Brian McDermott
	Charlie	Barry Steele
	Sam	Bryan Kendrick
	Ackroyd	Derek Tansley
	Barman	Lee Richardson
	Forbes	Glenn Williams
	Sales	John Mahoney

•	13 Hot Stuff	(12 May 1958)
	Producer	Gerard Glaister
	Director	Mervyn R. Pinfield
	Script	Bill Naughton
	Designer	Richard Wilmot
	Megs Turner	Nancy Nevinson
	Jim Turner	Philip Ray
	Hughie Turner	Barry MacGregor
	Joe Trimmer	George Roderick
	Louis	Donald Morley
	Harry Crane	Arnold Ridley
	Lacey	Harry Littlewood
	Gwyneth Turner	Gillian Gale
	Town Clerk	Christopher Hodge
	Councillor Hansford	Robert Perceval

•	14 The Law Steps In	(15 May 1958)
	Script	Allan Prior
	Producer	Gerard Glaister
	Director	Morris Barry
	Megs Turner	Nancy Nevinson
	Gwyneth Turner	Gillian Gale
	Jim Turner	Philip Ray
	Hughie Turner	Barry MacGregor
	Detective Gunn	Robert Lankesheer
	Detective Smith	Ronald Wood
	Policeman	Michael Stainton
	A drunk	John Herrington
	Mrs Brown	Olga Dickie
	Joe Trimmer	George Roderick
	Station Sergeant	Michael Logan

•	15 Let's Have a Party	(19 May 1958)
	Producer	Gerard Glaister
	Director	Mervyn R. Pinfield
	Scriptwriter	Allan Prior
	Designer	Austen Spriggs
	Megs Turner	Nancy Nevinson
	Jim Turner	Philip Ray
	Gwyneth Turner	Gillian Gale
	Mary Tennison	Patricia Mort
	Isobel	Pamela Abbott
	Hazel	Anne Pichon
	Doris	Jose Read
	Vera	Shane Cordell
	Tom Turner	Brian McDermott
	Allardyce	John Forbes-Robertson
	Messenger	Kenneth Alan Taylor
	Mrs Allardyce	Jean Theobald

•	16 Take Your Partners	(22 May 1958)
	Producer	Gerard Glaister
	Script	Allan Prior
	Designer	Austen Spriggs
	Mary Tennison	Patricia Mort
	Isobel	Pamela Abbott
	Hazel	Anne Pichon
	Doris	Jose Read
	Mrs Childs	Betty Cooper
	Vera	Shane Cordell
	Hughie Turner	Barry MacGregor
	Bernard Kay	Denis Holmes
	Mr Hargraves	Brown Derby
	Allardyce	John Forbes-Robertson
	Mrs Allardyce	Jean Theobald
	Megs Turner	Nancy Nevinson
	Jim Turner	Philip Ray
	Tom Turner	Brian McDermott
	Hector	David Rees

•	17 Bank Holiday Outing	(26 May 1958)
	Producer	Gerard Glaister
	Director	Morris Barry
	Scriptwriter	Bill Naughton
	Designer	Richard Wilmot
	Gwyneth Turner	Gillian Gale
	Megs Turner	Nancy Nevinson
	Jim Turner	Philip Ray
	Hughie Turner	Barry MacGregor
	Tom Turner	Brian McDermott
	Joe Trimmer	George Roderick
	Harry Crane	Arnold Ridley
	Jane Starr	Deirdre Day
	Robin Starr	Michael Murray
	Edith Starr	Barbara Cavan
	Joseph Starr	William Sherwood
	Charlie	Barry Steele
	Tim	John Cater
	Maggie	Rosemary Johnson
	Rita	Carolyn Garnham
	Linda	Avril Leslie
	Rene Cremer	Katherine Parr
	Alec Cremer	Michael Bird
	Barman	Lee Richardson
	Sid	Stanley Platts
	Mary Tennison	Patricia Mort
	Morny	Douglas Blackwell
	Bromley	Martin Sterndale

•	18 The Botcher	(29 May 1958)
	Producer	Gerard Glaister
	Director	Mervyn R. Pinfield
	Script	Bill Naughton
	Designer	Richard Wilmot
	Len Forbes	Glenn Williams
	Jim Turner	Philip Ray
	Harry Crane	Arnold Ridley
	Lacey	Harry Littlewood
	Bromley	Martin Sterndale
	Mathews	Leonard Williams
	Simpson	Maurice Durant
	Mrs Lacey	Brenda Dunrich
	Mary Tennison	Patricia Mort
	Megs Turner	Nancy Nevinson
	Gwyneth Turner	Gillian Gale
	Robin Starr	Michael Murray
	Tom Turner	Brian McDermott
	Hazel	Anne Pichon

•	19 Off Sick	(2 Jun 1958)
	Producer	Gerard Glaister
	Director	Morris Barry
	Scriptwriter	Allan Prior
	Jim Turner	Philip Ray
	Megs Turner	Nancy Nevinson
	Hughie Turner	Barry MacGregor
	Gwyneth Turner	Gillian Gale
	Tom Turner	Brian McDermott
	Robin Starr	Michael Murray
	Jane Starr	Deirdre Day
	Mrs Ellis	Esther McPherson
	Mrs Neale	Edevain Park
	Joe Trimmer	George Roderick
	Election canvasser	Harry Moore

•	20 Back on the Job	(5 Jun 1958)
	Producer	Gerard Glaister
	Scriptwriter	Allan Prior
	Designer	Austen Spriggs
	Jim Turner	Philip Ray
	Megs Turner	Nancy Nevinson
	Tom Turner	Brian McDermott
	Hughie Turner	Barry MacGregor
	Gwyneth Turner	Gillian Gale
	Robin Starr	Michael Murray
	Jane Starr	Deirdre Day
	Ackroyd	Derek Tansley
	Harry Crane	Arnold Ridley
	Mrs Neale	Edevain Park
	Mrs Sharp	Winifred Hill
	Joe Trimmer	George Roderick
	Mary Tennison	Patricia Mort
	Election Party Agent	Hugh Stewart
	Forbes	Glenn Williams

•	21 First in the Field	(9 Jun 1958)
	Producer	Gerard Glaister
	Script	Bill Naughton
	Robin Starr	Michael Murray
	Jane Starr	Deirdre Day
	Jim Turner	Philip Ray
	Rocky	Edward Cast
	Morny	Douglas Blackwell
	Harry Crane	Arnold Ridley
	Julia Starr	Pat Ann Key
	Doris	Jose Read
	Joseph Starr	William Sherwood
	Mary Tennison	Patricia Mort
	Tom Turner	Brian McDermott
	Simpson	Maurice Durant
	Bromley	Martin Sterndale
	Francis	Bruce Morton
	Deverson	Leonard White
	Forbes	Glenn Williams
	Hazel	Anne Pichon

•	22 Expect Me When You See Me	(12 Jun 1958)
	Producer	Gerard Glaister
	Director	Morris Barry
	Script	Bill Naughton
	Jim Turner	Philip Ray
	Megs Turner	Nancy Nevinson
	Gwyneth Turner	Gillian Gale
	Tom Turner	Brian McDermott
	Mary Tennison	Patricia Mort
	Jane Starr	Deirdre Day
	Robin Starr	Michael Murray
	Rocky	Edward Cast
	Morny	Douglas Blackwell
	Johnson	Michael Collins
	Forbes	Glenn Williams

•	23 Starter's Orders	(16 Jun 1958)
	Producer	Gerard Glaister
	Director	Christopher Barry
	Scriptwriter	Allan Prior
	Robin Starr	Michael Murray
	Jane Starr	Deirdre Day
	Joseph Starr	William Sherwood
	Mrs Starr	Barbara Cavan
	Marvin Lavery	Robert Cawdron
	Ilse	Ellen Blueth
	Julia Starr	Pat Ann Key
	Roger Smythe-Wilson	Derrick Sherwin
	Hughie Turner	Barry MacGregor
	Tom Turner	Brian McDermott
	Joe Trimmer	George Roderick

•	24 Into the Straight	(19 Jun 1958)
	Producer	Gerard Glaister
	Director	Morry Barry
	Script	Donald Bull
	Julia Starr	Pat Ann Key
	Joseph Starr	William Sherwood
	Robin Starr	Michael Murray
	Mrs Starr	Barbara Cavan
	Marvin Lavery	Robert Cawdron
	Hazel	Anne Pichon
	Doris	Jose Read
	Vera	Shane Cordell
	Jim Turner	Philip Ray
	Tom Turner	Brian McDermott
	Forbes	Glenn Williams
	Mrs Childs	Betty Cooper
	Bromley	Martin Sterndale
	Harry Crane	Arnold Ridley
	Charlie	Barry Steele
	Mary Tennison	Patricia Mort
	Mackie	George Cormack

•	25 Newcomer and Oldtimer	(23 Jun 1958)
	Producer	Gerard Glaister
	Director	Christopher Barry
	Script	Bill Naughton
	Harry Crane	Arnold Ridley
	Bromley	Martin Sterndale
	Jim Turner	Philip Ray
	Nursing Sister	Margaret Dale
	Jane Starr	Deirdre Day
	Robin Starr	Michael Murray
	Lacey	Harry Littlewood
	Forbes	Glenn Williams
	Rocky	Edward Cast
	Ackroyd	Derek Tansley
	Alec Cremer	Michael Bird
	Rene Cremer	Katherine Parr
	Barman	Lee Richardson
	Doctor	Henry Livings
	Mary Tennison	Patricia Mort
	Johnson	Michael Collins

•	26 Pride in the Job	(26 Jun 1958)
	Producer	Gerard Glaister
	Director	Christopher McMaster
	Script	Bill Naughton
	Hazel	Anne Pichon
	Doris	Jose Read
	Robin Starr	Michael Murray
	Bromley	Martin Sterndale
	Jim Turner	Philip Ray
	Harry Crane	Arnold Ridley
	Joseph Starr	William Sherwood
	Mrs Childs	Betty Cooper
	Megs Turner	Nancy Nevinson
	Mrs Crane	Betty Hare
	Mary Tennison	Patricia Mort
	Gwyneth Turner	Gillian Gale
	Hughie Turner	Barry MacGregor
	Tom Turner	Brian McDermott
	Rene Cremer	Katherine Parr
	Alec Cremer	Michael Bird
	Barman	Lee Richardson
	Ackroyd	Derek Tansley
	Rocky	Edward Cast
	Forbes	Glenn Williams
	Lacey	Harry Littlewood
	Johnson	Michael Collins

•	27 A Visit and a Problem	(30 Jun 1958)
	Producer	Gerard Glaister
	Director	Christopher Barry
	Script	Tom Espie
	Hazel	Anne Pichon
	Doris	Jose Read
	Robin Starr	Michael Murray
	Joseph Starr	William Sherwood
	Mackie	George Cormack
	Mrs Starr	Barbara Cavan
	Jane Starr	Deirdre Day
	Simpson	Maurice Durant
	Len Forbes	Glenn Williams
	Jackson	Stuart Saunders
	Miller	Philip Lennard
	Rocky	Edward Cast
	Bromley	Martin Sterndale

•	28 Raising the Wind	(3 Jul 1958)
	Producer	Gerard Glaister
	Director	Christopher McMaster
	Script	Tom Espie
	Robin Starr	Michael Murray
	Joseph Starr	William Sherwood
	Jane Starr	Deirdre Day
	Mr Short	Ross Hutchinson
	Mackie	George Cormack
	Hazel	Anne Pichon
	Sibley	Brian Nissen
	Doris	Jose Read
	Mr Landis	Ernest Hare
	Walter	Charles Hersch
	Mrs Starr	Barbara Cavan
	Mrs Childs	Betty Cooper

•	29 The New Member	(7 Jul 1958)
	Producer	Gerard Glaister
	Director	Christopher Barry
	Script	Allan Prior
	Ackroyd	Derek Tansley
	Forbes	Glenn Williams
	Mackie	George Cormack
	Simpson	Maurice Durant
	Allardyce	John Forbes-Robertson
	Jim Turner	Philip Ray
	Megs Turner	Nancy Nevinson
	Hughie Turner	Barry MacGregor
	Joe Trimmer	George Roderick
	Robin Starr	Michael Murray
	Jane Starr	Deirdre Day
	Hazel	Anne Pichon
	Anna	Joy Owen
	Reggie Stratton	Raymond Young
	Lacey	Harry Littlewood
	Miss Thorne	Ruth Palmer

•	30 Into the Breach	(10 Jul 1958)
	Producer	Gerard Glaister
	Script	Allan Prior
	Robin Starr	Michael Murray
	Jane Starr	Deirdre Day
	Reggie Stratton	Raymond Young
	Megs Turner	Nancy Nevinson
	Tom Turner	Brian McDermott
	Mary Tennison	Patricia Mort
	Jim Turner	Philip Ray
	Town Clerk	Christopher Hodge
	Mr Wood	Geoffrey Hibbert
	Bridget	Sally Travers
	Mr Watson Wyatt	Edward Rees
	Ackroyd	Derek Tansley

•	31 The Big Push	(14 Jul 1958)
	Producer	Gerard Glaister
	Director	Christopher McMaster
	Script	Tom Espie
	Tom Turner	Brian McDermott
	Mannion	Anthony Woodruff
	Joseph Starr	William Sherwood
	Robin Starr	Michael Murray
	Mrs Childs	Betty Cooper
	Mackie	George Cormack
	Simpson	Maurice Durant
	John Davies	Michael Scott
	Megs Turner	Nancy Nevinson
	Gwyneth Turner	Gillian Gale
	Jim Turner	Philip Ray
	Hughie Turner	Barry MacGregor
	Mary Tennison	Patricia Mort
	Isobel	Pamela Abbott

•	32 The Once-Over	(17 Jul 1958)
	Producer	Gerard Glaister
	Director	Christopher Barry
	Script	Tom Espie
	Joseph Starr	William Sherwood
	Mrs Starr	Barbara Cavan
	Hughie Turner	Barry MacGregor
	Tom Turner	Brian McDermott
	Robin Starr	Michael Murray
	Jane Starr	Deirdre Day
	Mrs Mannion	Joyce Gregg
	Mannion	Anthony Woodruff
	Exton	Hugh Cross
	Ilse	Ellen Blueth
	Rosemary	Anne Marryott
	Linda	Avril Leslie
	Charlie Rogers	Warren Mitchell
	Julia Starr	Pat Ann Key
	Anna	Joy Owen

•	33 A New Appointment	(21 Jul 1958)
	Producer	Gerard Glaister
	Director	Morris Barry
	Script	Allan Prior
	Mrs Childs	Betty Cooper
	Joseph Starr	William Sherwood
	Julia Starr	Pat Ann Key
	Robin Starr	Michael Murray
	Exton	Hugh Cross
	Simpson	Maurice Durant
	Hazel	Anne Pichon
	Doris	Jose Read
	Marge	Doris Gilmore
	Forbes	Glenn Williams
	Bromley	Martin Sterndale
	Lacey	Harry Littlewood
	Tom Turner	Brian McDermott
	Connors	Frank Pettitt
	Rocky	Edward Cast
	Charlie Rogers	Warren Mitchell
	Allardyce	John Forbes-Robertson

•	34 In a Fog	(24 Jul 1958)
	Producer	Gerard Glaister
	Director	Christopher Barry
	Script	Allan Prior
	Allardyce	John Forbes-Robertson
	Tom Turner	Brian McDermott
	Julia Starr	Pat Ann Key
	Hughie Turner	Barry MacGregor
	Betsy	Pat Lawrence
	Mrs Crane	Betty Hare
	Geoffrey Ford	Antony Kenway
	Sarah Ford	Gillian Owen
	Police Constable	John Baker

•	35 Out of his Depth	(28 Jul 1958)
	Producer	Gerard Glaister
	Director	Morris Barry
	Script	Donald Bull; Ray Rigby
	Robin Starr	Michael Murray
	Julia Starr	Pat Ann Key
	Tom Turner	Brian McDermott
	Exton	Hugh Cross
	Simpson	Maurice Durant
	Hazel	Anne Pichon
	Doris	Jose Read
	Hughie	Barry MacGregor
	Leo	Hedley Colson
	Dudley	Derek Mayhew
	Jill	Angela Browne

•	36 A Very Fine Fiddle	(31 Jul 1958)
	Producer	Gerard Glaister
	Director	Christopher McMaster
	Script	Donald Bull; Ray Rigby
	Hughie Turner	Barry MacGregor
	Tom Turner	Brian McDermott
	Allardyce	John Forbes-Robertson
	Connors	Frank Pettitt
	Julia Starr	Pat Ann Key
	Simpson	Maurice Durant
	Mannion	Anthony Woodruff
	Robin Starr	Michael Murray
	Mary Tennison	Patricia Mort

•	37 Welcome Home	(4 Aug 1958)
	Producer	Gerard Glaister
	Director	Christopher Barry
	Scriptwriter	Tom Espie
	Tom Turner	Brian McDermott
	Jim Turner	Philip Ray
	Joe Trimmer	George Roderick
	Hughie Turner	Barry MacGregor
	Charlie Rogers	Warren Mitchell
	Harry Crane	Arnold Ridley
	Forbes	Glenn Williams
	Lacey	Harry Littlewood
	Rene Cremer	Katherine Parr
	Barman	Lee Richardson

•	38 Strictly Business	(7 Aug 1958)
	Producer	Gerard Glaister
	Director	Christopher McMaster
	Script	Tom Espie
	Forbes	Glenn Williams
	Lacey	Harry Littlewood
	Bromley	Martin Sterndale
	Jim Turner	Philip Ray
	Tom Turner	Brian McDermott
	Joe Trimmer	George Roderick
	Hughie Turner	Barry MacGregor
	Harry Crane	Arnold Ridley
	Rene Cremer	Katherine Parr
	Barman	Lee Richardson
	Attendant	Peter Morny

•	39 Father and Daughter	(11 Aug 1958)
	Producer	Gerard Glaister
	Director	Morris Barry
	Script	Bill Naughton
	Hazel	Anne Pichon
	Mr Truelove	George Bishop
	Mrs Brown	Olga Dickie
	Mrs Childs	Betty Cooper
	Exton	Hugh Cross
	Miss Thorne	Ruth Palmer
	Bernard Kay	Denis Holmes
	Marge	Doris Gilmore
	Forbes	Glenn Williams
	Lacey	Harry Littlewood
	Bromley	Martin Sterndale
	Tom Turner	Brian McDermott
	Mary Tennison	Patricia Mort
	Doris	Jose Read
	Mrs Kay	Vanda Godsell

•	40 Flight to Freedom	(14 Aug 1958)
	Producer	Gerard Glaister
	Script	Bill Naughton
	Mrs Childs	Betty Cooper
	Doris	Jose Read
	Simpson	Maurice Durant
	Ackroyd	Derek Tansley
	Hazel	Anne Pichon
	Bernard Kay	Denis Holmes
	Miss Thorne	Ruth Palmer
	Marge	Doris Gilmore
	Mrs Kay	Vanda Godsell
	Mr Truelove	George Bishop

•	41 The Wrong Job	(18 Aug 1958)
	Producer	Gerard Glaister
	Director	Christopher Barry
	Script	Allan Prior
	Forbes	Glenn Williams
	Jim Turner	Philip Ray
	Ackroyd	Derek Tansley
	Hughie Turner	Barry MacGregor
	Megs Turner	Nancy Nevinson
	Gwyneth Turner	Gillian Gale
	Tom Turner	Brian McDermott
	Lacey	Harry Littlewood
	Bromley	Martin Sterndale
	Exton	Hugh Cross
	Doris	Jose Read
	Simpson	Maurice Durant

•	42 The Test	(21 Aug 1958)
	Producer	Gerard Glaister
	Director	Morris Barry
	Script	Allan Prior
	Bromley	Martin Sterndale
	Jim Turner	Philip Ray
	Forbes	Glenn Williams
	Joseph Starr	William Sherwood
	Simpson	Maurice Durant
	Exton	Hugh Cross
	Robin Starr	Michael Murray
	Mackie	George Cormack
	Mannion	Anthony Woodruff
	Doris	Jose Read
	Marge	Doris Gilmore
	Lacey	Harry Littlewood

•	43 The Long Lunch Hour	(25 Aug 1958)
	Producer	Gerard Glaister
	Director	Christopher Barry
	Script	Allan Prior
	Doris	Jose Read
	Simpson	Maurice Durant
	Mannion	Anthony Woodruff
	Mackie	George Cormack
	John Davies	Michael Scott
	Robin Starr	Michael Murray
	Julia Starr	Pat Ann Key
	Joseph Starr	William Sherwood
	Mrs Starr	Barbara Cavan
	Anna	Joy Owen

•	44 The Matchmaker	(28 Aug 1958)
	Producer	Gerard Glaister
	Director	Morris Barry
	Script	Allan Prior
	Mrs Starr	Barbara Cavan
	Ilse	Ellen Blueth
	Julia Starr	Pat Ann Key
	John Davies	Michael Scott
	Joseph Starr	William Sherwood
	Robin Starr	Michael Murray
	Doris	Jose Read
	Tom Turner	Brian McDermott
	Mannion	Anthony Woodruff
	Forbes	Glenn Williams
	Lacey	Harry Littlewood
	Marge	Doris Gilmore
	Rocky	Edward Cast
	Bromley	Martin Sterndale
	Ackroyd	Derek Tansley

•	45 Vested Interests	(1 Sep 1958)
	Producer	Gerard Glaister
	Director	Christopher McMaster
	Script	Tom Espie
	Geoffrey Ford	Antony Kenway
	Joseph Starr	William Sherwood
	Robin Starr	Michael Murray
	Mrs Starr	Barbara Cavan
	John Davies	Michael Scott
	Julia Starr	Pat Ann Key
	Jane Starr	Deirdre Day

•	46 Leave it to Me	(4 Sep 1958)
	Producer	Gerard Glaister
	Director	Christopher Barry
	Script	Tom Espie
	Julia Starr	Pat Ann Key
	John Davies	Michael Scott
	Barmaid	Peggyann Clifford
	Joseph Starr	William Sherwood
	Mrs Starr	Barbara Cavan
	Robin Starr	Michael Murray
	Geoffrey Ford	Antony Kenway
	Doctor	Robert Young
	Travel Agency clerk	Brian Badcoe

•	47 Missing from Home	(8 Sep 1958)
	Producer	Gerard Glaister
	Director	Christopher McMaster
	Script	Bill Naughton
	Megs Turner	Nancy Nevinson
	Tom Turner	Brian McDermott
	Gwyneth Turner	Gillian Gale
	Fay	Hazel Peters
	Isobel	Pamela Abbott
	Jane Starr	Deirdre Day
	Linda Booth	Pauline Black
	Mary Tennison	Patricia Mort
	Mrs Booth	Katherine Page
	Strange Man	Edward Brooks
	Joe Trimmer	George Roderick
	Post Office Clerk	Robert Tollast

•	48 Taken for a Ride	(11 Sep 1958)
	Producer	Gerard Glaister
	Director	Christopher Barry
	Script	Bill Naughton
	Megs Turner	Nancy Nevinson
	Joe Trimmer	George Roderick
	Tom Turner	Brian McDermott
	Mary Tennison	Patricia Mort
	Soldier	Kenneth Waller
	Gwyneth Turner	Gillian Gale
	Booking clerk	Douglas Bradley-Smith
	Detective	Jack Leonard
	Strange man	Edward Brooks
	Strange man's aunt	Alice Esmie-Bell
	Isobel	Pamela Abbott
	Mac	Michael O'Brien
	Taff	Gareth Jones
	Fred	Frank Crane

•	49 The Penalty Clause	(15 Sep 1958)
	Producer	Barbara Burnham
	Director	Morris Barry
	Script	Donald Bull; Ray Rigby
	Rocky	Edward Cast
	Forbes	Glenn Williams
	Bromley	Martin Sterndale
	Peggy	Stella Riley
	Simpson	Maurice Durant
	Exton	Hugh Cross
	Harry Watson	Frank Pemberton
	Rankin	John Rae
	Joseph Starr	William Sherwood
	Robin Starr	Michael Murray
	Mackie	George Cormack
	Preston	Meadows White
	Mrs Childs	Betty Cooper
	Jackson	Stuart Saunders
	Mrs Starr	Barbara Cavan

•	50 Glass, Handle with Care	(18 Sep 1958)
	Producer	Barbara Burnham
	Director	Christopher McMaster
	Script	Donald Bull; Ray Rigby
	Jim Turner	Philip Ray
	Rocky	Edward Cast
	Len Forbes	Glenn Williams
	Willie Brown	Astley Harvey
	Fred Lyle	William Forbes
	Lacey	Harry Littlewood
	Bromley	Martin Sterndale
	Mrs Childs	Betty Cooper
	Deverson	Leonard White
	Joseph Starr	William Sherwood
	Robin Starr	Michael Murray
	Simpson	Maurice Durant
	Ackroyd	Derek Tansley
	Preston	Meadows White
	Stanley	John Barrett

•	51 Willie	(22 Sep 1958)
	Producer	Barbara Burnham
	Director	Morris Barry
	Script	Donald Bull; Ray Rigby
	Willie Brown	Astley Harvey
	Fred Lyle	William Forbes
	Jim Turner	Philip Ray
	Lacey	Harry Littlewood
	Rocky	Edward Cast
	Forbes	Glenn Williams
	Peggy	Stella Riley
	Bromley	Martin Sterndale
	Harry Crane	Arnold Ridley
	Rene Cremer	Katherine Parr
	Fitzroy	Mark Heath
	Hughie Turner	Barry MacGregor
	Sid	Raymond Llewellyn
	Joe Trimmer	George Roderick
	First boy	Philip Lowrie
	Audrey	Jean Marlow
	Megs Turner	Nancy Nevinson

•	52 Green Fingers	(25 Sep 1958)
	Producer	Barbara Burnham
	Director	Christopher McMaster
	Script	Donald Bull; Ray Rigby
	Willie Brown	Astley Harvey
	Fred Lyle	William Forbes
	Jim Turner	Philip Ray
	Lacey	Harry Littlewood
	Rocky	Edward Cast
	Forbes	Glenn Williams
	Peggy	Stella Riley
	Bromley	Martin Sterndale
	Rene Cremer	Katherine Parr
	Fitzroy	Mark Heath
	Simpson	Maurice Durant
	Exton	Hugh Cross
	Security Guard	Denzil Ellis

•	53 Sullbridge Flu	(29 Sep 1958)
	Producer	Barbara Burnham
	Director	Morris Barry
	Script	Barbara S Harper
	Mary Tennison	Patricia Mort
	Doris	Jose Read
	Molly	Cecilia May
	Trina Brody	Renny Lister
	Exton	Hugh Cross
	Mrs Brody	Edna Doré
	Mr Brody	Ronald Mansell
	Jim Turner	Philip Ray
	Forbes	Glenn Williams
	Bromley	Martin Sterndale

•	54 Women and Walnut Trees	(2 Oct 1958)
	Producer	Barbara Burnham
	Director	Christopher McMaster
	Script	Barbara S Harper
	Mary Tennison	Patricia Mort
	Isobel	Pamela Abbott
	Hughie Turner	Barry MacGregor
	Jim Turner	Philip Ray
	Forbes	Glenn Williams
	Bromley	Martin Sterndale
	Mrs Brody	Edna Doré
	Trina Brody	Renny Lister
	Mr Brody	Ronald Mansell
	Tom Turner	Brian McDermott

•	55 The First Team	(6 Oct 1958)
	See page 5 (of Radio Times)	
	Producer	Barbara Burnham
	Director	Christopher McMaster
	Script	Allan Prior
	Simpson	Maurice Durant
	Ford	Antony Kenway
	Robin Starr	Michael Murray
	Arthur Gilbert	Graham Crowden
	Len Forbes	Glenn Williams
	Trina	Renny Lister
	Jim Turner	Philip Ray
	Bromley	Martin Sterndale
	Allardyce	John Forbes-Robertson
	Tom Turner	Brian McDermott
	Mannion	Anthony Woodruff
	Megs Turner	Nancy Nevinson
	Gwyneth Turner	Gillian Gale
	Mary Tennison	Patricia Mort

•	56 Under Observation	(9 Oct 1958)
	Producer	Barbara Burnham
	Director	Morris Barry
	Script	Allan Prior
	Megs Turner	Nancy Nevinson
	Tom Turner	Brian McDermott
	Jim Turner	Philip Ray
	Hughie Turner	Barry MacGregor
	Len Forbes	Glenn Williams
	Arthur Gilbert	Graham Crowden
	Lacey	Harry Littlewood
	Mary Tennison	Patricia Mort
	Joe Trimmer	George Roderick
	Rene Cremer	Katherine Parr
	Mannion	Anthony Woodruff

•	57 The Big Deal	(13 Oct 1958)
	Producer	Barbara Burnham
	Director	Christopher McMaster
	Script	Tom Espie
	Betsy	Pat Lawrence
	Hughie Turner	Barry MacGregor
	Joe Trimmer	George Roderick
	Tom Turner	Brian McDermott
	Mary Tennison	Patricia Mort
	Gus	Graeme Sisson
	Geoff Ford	Antony Kenway
	Arthur Gilbert	Graham Crowden
	Jeckyll	Don Withrow
	Riley	Jack Melford
	Smiley Hopkinson	Claude Jones
	Jim Turner	Philip Ray
	Rene Cremer	Katherine Parr
	Sarah Ford	Gillian Owen

•	58 Rush Job	(16 Oct 1958)
	Producer	Barbara Burnham
	Script	Tom Espie
	Tom Turner	Brian McDermott
	Arthur Gilbert	Graham Crowden
	Jim Turner	Philip Ray
	Len Forbes	Glenn Williams
	Megs Turner	Nancy Nevinson
	Gwyn	Gillian Gale
	Rene Cremer	Katherine Parr
	Paddy Wilson	Paddy Stephens

•	59 A Spanner in the Works	(20 Oct 1958)
	Producer	Barbara Burnham
	Script	Barbara S Harper
	Joseph Starr	William Sherwood
	Robin Starr	Michael Murray
	Jane Starr	Deirdre Day
	Mannion	Anthony Woodruff
	Alice Nichol	Joyce Marlow
	Nora Simpson	Sheila Raynor
	Lacey	Harry Littlewood
	Hobbs	Fred MacNaughton
	Trina	Renny Lister
	Sid Camden	Malcolm Farquhar
	Bromley	Martin Sterndale
	Len Forbes	Glenn Williams
	Simpson	Maurice Durant

•	60 Alarms and Excursions	(23 Oct 1958)
	Producer	Barbara Burnham
	Director	Christopher McMaster
	Script	Barbara S Harper
	Joseph Starr	William Sherwood
	Robin Starr	Michael Murray
	Jane Starr	Deirdre Day
	Simpson	Maurice Durant
	Nora Simpson	Sheila Raynor
	Alice Nichol	Joyce Marlow
	Mannion	Anthony Woodruff
	Bromley	Martin Sterndale
	Sid Camden	Malcolm Farquhar
	Hobbs	Fred MacNaughton
	Trina	Renny Lister

•	61 A Friend in Need	(27 Oct 1958)
	Producer	Barbara Burnham
	Director	Morris Barry
	Script	Allan Prior
	Lacey	Harry Littlewood
	Bromley	Martin Sterndale
	Rene Cremer	Katherine Parr
	Harry Crane	Arnold Ridley
	Jim Turner	Philip Ray
	Joe Trimmer	George Roderick
	Hughie Turner	Barry MacGregor
	Megs Turner	Nancy Nevinson
	Barley	Edward Evans
	Tom Turner	Brian McDermott

•	62 Money Worries	(30 Oct 1958)
	Producer	Barbara Burnham
	Director	Christopher McMaster
	Script	Allan Prior
	Jim Turner	Philip Ray
	Megs Turner	Nancy Nevinson
	Hughie Turner	Barry MacGregor
	Harry Crane	Arnold Ridley
	Rene Cremer	Katherine Parr
	Bromley	Martin Sterndale
	Forbes	Glenn Williams
	Barley	Edward Evans
	Joe Trimmer	George Roderick
	Bank Manager	Michael Logan
	Clerk	Haydn Ward

•	63 The White House	(3 Nov 1958)
	Producer	Barbara Burnham
	Director	Morris Barry
	Script	Tom Espie
	Mrs Childs	Betty Cooper
	Robin Starr	Michael Murray
	Ford	Antony Kenway
	Ford's secretary	Janet Hicks
	Joseph Starr	William Sherwood
	Tom Turner	Brian McDermott
	Arthur Gilbert	Graham Crowden
	Councillor Huxtable	Harold G Robert
	Gordon	Stratford Johns
	Jennie	Stella Richman
	Grover	Brown Derby
	Barley	Edward Evans
	Waiter	Horace Sequeira
	Len Forbes	Glenn Williams
	Jim Turner	Philip Ray

•	64 Calculated Risk	(6 Nov 1958)
	Producer	Barbara Burnham
	Director	Morris Barry
	Arthur Gilbert	Graham Crowden
	Joseph Starr	William Sherwood
	Jennie	Stella Richman
	Barley	Edward Evans
	Gordon	Stratford Johns
	Grover	Brown Derby
	Security man	John Richmond
	Jim Turner	Philip Ray
	Len Forbes	Glenn Williams
	Robin Starr	Michael Murray
	Mrs Childs	Betty Cooper
	Tom Turner	Brian McDermott
	Councillor Huxtable	Harold G Robert
	Waiter	Horace Sequeira

•	65 A Wedding has been Arranged	(10 Nov 1958)
	Producer	Barbara Burnham
	Script	Donald Bull; Ray Rigby
	Len Forbes	Glenn Williams
	Mr Brody	Ronald Mansell
	Trina	Renny Lister
	Tom Turner	Brian McDermott
	Jim Turner	Philip Ray
	Mary Tennison	Patricia Mort
	Hazel	Anne Pichon
	Isobel	Pamela Abbott
	Doris	Jose Read
	Gwyneth Turner	Gillian Gale
	Mrs Childs	Betty Cooper
	Megs Turner	Nancy Nevinson
	Mrs Tennison	Anne Blake

•	66 Together and Apart	(13 Nov 1958)
	Producer	Barbara Burnham
	Script	Donald Bull; Ray Rigby
	Director	Dorothea Brooking
	Mrs Tennison	Anne Blake
	Mary	Patricia Mort
	Tom Turner	Brian McDermott
	Trina	Renny Lister
	Len	Glenn Williams
	Mr Tennison	Charles Lamb
	Molly Dawes	Jane Cain
	Hughie Turner	Barry MacGregor
	Jim Turner	Philip Ray
	Megs Turner	Nancy Nevinson
	Isobel	Pamela Abbott
	Doris	Jose Read
	Hazel	Anne Pichon
	Bromley	Martin Sterndale
	Lacey	Harry Littlewood
	Rene Cremer	Katherine Parr
	Harry Crane	Arnold Ridley

•	67 On the Rocks	(17 Nov 1958)
	Producer	Barbara Burnham
	Director	Christopher McMaster
	Script	Barbara S Harper
	Jim Turner	Philip Ray
	Trina	Renny Lister
	Arthur Gilbert	Graham Crowden
	Len Forbes	Glenn Williams
	Jennie	Stella Richman
	Mr Brody	Ronald Mansell
	Craig	Nicholas Selby
	Mrs Brody	Edna Doré

•	68 Men of the World	(20 Nov 1958)
	Producer	Barbara Burnham
	Director	Morris Barry
	Script	Barbara S Harper
	Len Forbes	Glenn Williams
	Trina	Renny Lister
	Mr Brody	Ronald Mansell
	Mrs Brody	Edna Doré
	Arthur Gilbert	Graham Crowden
	Jennie	Stella Richman
	Jim Turner	Philip Ray
	Bromley	Martin Sterndale
	Craig	Nicholas Selby
	Rene Cremer	Katherine Parr

•	69 Work for Work's Sake	(24 Nov 1958)
	Producer	Barbara Burnham
	Script	Allan Prior
	Director	Morris Barry
	Robin Starr	Michael Murray
	Joseph Starr	William Sherwood
	Ackroyd	Derek Tansley
	Simpson	Maurice Durant
	Mannion	Anthony Woodruff
	Bromley	Martin Sterndale
	Hobbs	Fred MacNaughton
	Sid Camden	Malcolm Farquhar
	Len Forbes	Glenn Williams
	Tom Turner	Brian McDermott
	Mary	Patricia Mort
	Petrie	John Nettleton
	Exton	Hugh Cross
	Lacey	Harry Littlewood
	Thomas	Edward Palmer
	Hazel	Anne Pichon

•	70 Perpetual Motion	(27 Nov 1958)
	Producer	Barbara Burnham
	Script	Barbara S Harper
	Jim Turner	Philip Ray
	Megs Turner	Nancy Nevinson
	Joseph Starr	William Sherwood
	Tom Turner	Brian McDermott
	Len Forbes	Glenn Williams
	Arthur Gilbert	Graham Crowden
	Alf Stott	Eddie Malin
	Mike Dooley	Shay Gorman
	Mary	Patricia Mort
	Trina	Renny Lister
	Craig	Nicholas Selby
	Robin Starr	Michael Murray
	Ford	Antony Kenway
	Petrie	John Nettleton

•	71 Patent Bluff	(1 Dec 1958)
	Producer	Barbara Burnham
	Director	Dorothea Brooking
	Script	Tom Espie
	Jim Turner	Philip Ray
	Joseph Starr	William Sherwood
	Robin Starr	Michael Murray
	Jane Starr	Deirdre Day
	Arthur Gilbert	Graham Crowden
	Len Forbes	Glenn Williams
	Petrie	John Nettleton
	McColl	Guy Kingsley Poynter
	Mike Dooley	Shay Gorman
	Alf Stott	Eddie Malin
	Mrs Childs	Betty Cooper
	Buxton	Jack Newmark
	Ford	Antony Kenway

•	72 To Catch a Mackerel	(4 Dec 1958)
	Producer	Barbara Burnham
	Director	Morris Barry
	Script	Tom Espie
	Joseph Starr	William Sherwood
	Robin Starr	Michael Murray
	Ford	Antony Kenway
	Arthur Gilbert	Graham Crowden
	McColl	Guy Kingsley Poynter
	Alf Stott	Eddie Malin
	Mike Dooley	Shay Gorman
	Mrs Childs	Betty Cooper
	Jane Starr	Deirdre Day
	Lord Kitteridge	Deering Wells
	Hazel	Anne Pichon

•	73 Woman in the Case	(8 Dec 1958)
	Producer	Barbara Burnham
	Script	Allan Prior
	Robin Starr	Michael Murray
	Gwyneth Turner	Gillian Gale
	Hughie Turner	Barry MacGregor
	Jane Starr	Deirdre Day
	Mrs Childs	Betty Cooper
	Vincent Childs	David Webb
	Elizabeth Masters	Joan Carol
	Mr Dewey	Jeremy Geidt
	Hazel	Anne Pichon
	Louis	Donald Morley
	Ford	Antony Kenway
	Teenage girl	Anita Robinson
	Teenage boy	William Simons

•	74 The Intruders	(11 Dec 1958)
	Producer	Barbara Burnham
	Script	Allan Prior
	Director	Dorothea Brooking
	Robin Starr	Michael Murray
	Megs Turner	Nancy Nevinson
	Jane Starr	Deirdre Day
	Gwyneth Turner	Gillian Gale
	Hughie Turner	Barry MacGregor
	Exton	Hugh Cross
	Mrs Childs	Betty Cooper
	Elizabeth Masters	Joan Carol
	Mannion	Anthony Woodruff
	Ford	Antony Kenway
	Hazel	Anne Pichon
	Campbell	Brian Hayes
	Mr Dewey	Jeremy Geidt
	Vincent	David Webb
	Ethel	Annabelle Lee

•	75 Executive Triangle	(15 Dec 1958)
	Producer	Barbara Burnham
	Script	Tom Espie
	Director	Morris Barry
	Jim Turner	Philip Ray
	Megs Turner	Nancy Nevinson
	Robin Starr	Michael Murray
	Jane Starr	Deirdre Day
	Gwyneth	Gillian Gale
	Hughie	Barry MacGregor
	Mrs Childs	Betty Cooper
	Vincent Childs	David Webb
	Mannion	Anthony Woodruff
	Ford	Antony Kenway
	Exton	Hugh Cross
	Campbell	Brian Hayes
	Hazel	Anne Pichon
	Bridget	Sally Travers

•	76 Take My Advice	(18 Dec 1958)
	Producer	Barbara Burnham
	Script	Barbara S Harper
	Joseph Starr	William Sherwood
	Edith Starr	Barbara Cavan
	Robin Starr	Michael Murray
	Jane Starr	Deirdre Day
	Jim Turner	Philip Ray
	Megs Turner	Nancy Nevinson
	Tom	Brian McDermott
	Mary	Patricia Mort
	Hughie	Barry MacGregor
	Gwyneth	Gillian Gale
	Arthur Gilbert	Graham Crowden
	Len Forbes	Glenn Williams
	Mrs Childs	Betty Cooper
	Joe Trimmer	George Roderick
	Geoffrey Ford	Antony Kenway

•	77 Time to Say Goodbye	(22 Dec 1958)
	Producer	Barbara Burnham
	Script	Barbara S Harper
	Director	Morris Barry
	Jim Turner	Philip Ray
	Megs Turner	Nancy Nevinson
	Tom Turner	Brian McDermott
	Hughie Turner	Barry MacGregor
	Gwyneth Turner	Gillian Gale
	Mary	Patricia Mort
	Joseph Starr	William Sherwood
	Robin Starr	Michael Murray
	Jane Starr	Deirdre Day
	Edith Starr	Barbara Cavan
	Mrs Childs	Betty Cooper
	Vincent	David Webb
	Arthur Gilbert	Graham Crowden
	Ford	Antony Kenway
	Bromley	Martin Sterndale
	Len Forbes	Glenn Williams
	Exton	Hugh Cross
	Mannion	Anthony Woodruff
	Simpson	Maurice Durant
	Hazel	Anne Pichon
	Doris	Jose Read
	Lacey	Harry Littlewood
	Harry Crane	Arnold Ridley
	Marge	Doris Gilmore
