= Vanda Godsell =

English actress (1922–1990)

- Godsell in This Sporting Life in 1963
- Born: Nancy Evelyn Godsell; 17 November 1922; Bognor Regis, Sussex, England
- Died: c. 2 April 1990 (aged 67); North Kensington, Greater London, England
- Other names: Nancy Evelyn Selway; Nancy Evelyn Orchard
- Occupation: Actress
- Years active: 1937–1983
- Television: The Newcomers
- Spouses: George Selway (m. 1954; div. 1957) Alan Orchard (m. 1964; died 1979)
- Relatives: Naomi Jacob (maternal aunt)

Nancy Evelyn Orchard (née Godsell, formerly Selway; 17 November 1922 – c. 2 April 1990), known professionally as Vanda Godsell, was an English actress. With a career that spanned 46 years, she was best known for her role as Katie Heenan in the BBC One soap opera The Newcomers (1966–1969).

Hal Erickson writes in AllMovie, "Vanda Godsell specialised in playing disheveled housewives, busybody landladies and blowsy domestics."

== Early life ==
Nancy Evelyn Godsell was born in Bognor Regis, Sussex, England, on 17 November 1922, as the youngest child to Reginald Godsell, a retired Royal Navy commander who had participated in the Battle of Jutland, and his wife, Muriel Wilfreda Rachel Ellington (née Abbott or Jacob), an author, who was the sister of Naomi Jacob, a novelist.

She had two elder sisters, Muriel Felicia Mary Atkinson (née Godsell), an actress, and Audrey Rosemary Nina "Audrie" Atcheson (née Godsell, formally Young), an editor in the publishing world.

== Career ==
Godsell began her career as an actress when she joined the Bristol Repertoire in 1937, at the age of 14. She made her stage debut on 10 August 1942, portraying Nancy in Barry O'Brien and Roy Limbert's production of Gaslight. She made her television debut on 3 April 1949, with the role of Mirabelle in the television film My Mother Said.

She made her broadcasting debut on 4 March 1950, as the voice of Lulu Smith in the BBC Home Service production of the BBC Television series Sunday Night Theatre. She made her film debut in November 1953, with the role of Angela Neilson in the second feature ('B') crime film Flannelfoot.

Godsell portrayed Hilda Wardle in the ITV soap opera Coronation Street. She appeared in 14 episodes from 25 January 1961. The character was a lady friend of Christine Hardman's uncle Edwin Mason, who came to make sure Christine has enough money to live on following her mother's sudden death.

Godsell portrayed Katie Heenan in the BBC One soap opera The Newcomers from 1966 to 1969.

Godsell retired on 5 September 1983, following her role as Woman in the debut episode of the ITV television series Reilly, Ace of Spies.

== Personal life ==
Godsell married her first husband, George Selway, an actor, in Marylebone, Middlesex in October 1954. The couple divorced in 1957, after two years of marriage.

Godsell married her second husband, Alan Joseph Orchard (born 4 December 1924), in Hampstead, London, in January 1964. She was widowed in April 1979, after 15 years of marriage.

== Death ==
On 2 April 1990, Godsell was found dead at age 67, lying naked in an empty bathtub at her North Kensington home. Her body was discovered by police after neighbours of Scrubs Lane, complained of the putrid odor coming from her home. Her funeral service and cremation took place on 17 April 1990 at Mortlake Crematorium.

The inquest into Godsell's death was held at Hammersmith Crown Court in early November 1990, and heard from her brother-in-law, Francis Atcheson, that she had been prone to drinking heavily. Coroner John Burton reported that her body was in such a state of decomposition that her cause of death could not be ascertained. Burton recorded an open verdict.

== Filmography ==
=== Stage ===
Year	Title	Role	Production	Location
1942	Gaslight	Nancy	Barry O'Brien and Roy Limbert	King's Theatre, Edinburgh and Opera House, Manchester
1944	The Corn Is Green	Bessie Watty	Derek Salberg's Repertory Company	Alexandra Theatre, Birmingham
1944	Jane Eyre		Wolverhampton Repertory Company	Grand Theatre, Wolverhampton
1944	Laburnum Road	Elsie Radfern	Derek Salberg's Repertory Company	Alexandra Theatre, Birmingham
1944	Hattie Stowes	Elsie Peters	Derek Salberg's Repertory Company	Alexandra Theatre, Birmingham
1945	The Late Christopher Bean	Ada Haggett	Derek Salberg's Repertory Company	Alexandra Theatre, Birmingham
1945	Claudia	Julia Naughton	Derek Salberg's Repertory Company	Alexandra Theatre, Birmingham
1945	A Soldier for Christmas	Millie Smith	Derek Salberg's Repertory Company	Alexandra Theatre, Birmingham
1945	Little Women	Amy		Alexandra Theatre, Birmingham
1945	Worm's Eye View	Thelma	Derek Salberg's Repertory Company	Alexandra Theatre, Birmingham
1948	Trespass	Mrs Amos	Wolverhampton Repertory Company	Grand Theatre, Wolverhampton
1948	Lovers' Leap	Helen Storer	Wolverhampton Repertory Company	Grand Theatre, Wolverhampton
1948	Tons of Money	Louise Allington		Grand Theatre, Wolverhampton
1949	Tomorrow is a Lovely Day		Windsor Repertory Company	Theatre Royal, Windsor
1949	Jane Steps Out	Jane	Windsor Repertory Company	Theatre Royal, Windsor
1951	A Streetcar Named Desire	Blanche De Bois		Devonshire Park Theatre, Eastbourne and Palace Pier Theatre, Brighton
1956	Mister Lear	Violet Danefield	Worthing Theatre Company	Connaught Theatre, Worthing
1957	The Reluctant Debutant	Sheila Broadbent	Worthing Theatre Company	Connaught Theatre, Worthing
1957	An Air for Murder	Mrs Eltner	Worthing Theatre Company	Connaught Theatre, Worthing
1958	Daddy-O!	Maud Hopkinson	Worthing Theatre Company	Connaught Theatre, Worthing
1958	Summer of the Seventeenth Doll	Olive	Windsor Repertory Company	Theatre Royal, Windsor
1958	A Touch of the Sun	Margaret Lester	Windsor Repertory Company	Theatre Royal, Windsor
1959	All in the Family	Sylvie Sauvin	Henry Sherek Ltd	Strand Theatre, London, Grand Theatre & Opera House, Leeds, and other locations
1960–1961	The Lion in Love			Bristol Hippodrome
1961	The Pinedus Affair	The Lady	Pembroke Theatre Croydon	Pembroke Theatre, Croydon
1961	Life Worth Living	Maisie	Alexandra Repertory Company with Basil Dean Productions Ltd	Alexandra Theatre, Birmingham
1965	The Night of the Iguana	Maxine Faulk	Bernard Delfont, Clement Scott Gilbert, Hugh Wonter, New Pembroke Theatre Ltd	Savoy Theatre, London, Ashcroft Theatre, Croydon, and other locations
1970	The Wild Duck	Mrs Bertha Sorby	The Play Company of London	Criterion Theatre, London
1971	The Anniversary	Mum	Newpalm Productions	Princess Theatre, Tourquay, Cambridge Arts Theatre, and other locations
1973	The Starving Rich	Esther Fisher	Tom Arnold Presentations Ltd	Theatre Royal, Brighton, The Playhouse, Weston-super-Mare, and other locations
1974	The Morgan Yard	Carrie Morgan	Mercury Theatre Company	Mercury Theatre, Colchester
1974	Blue, White and Red	Madame Renoir	Birmingham Repertory Company	Birmingham Repertory Theatre
1975	She Stoops to Conquer	Mrs Hardcastle	Nottingham Playhouse Company	Nottingham Playhouse
1975	Major Barbara	Lady Britomart	Nottingham Playhouse Company	Nottingham Playhouse
1975	Habeas Corpus	Muriel Wicksteed	Liverpool Playhouse	Liverpool Playhouse
1977	George and Mildred	Ethel Pomfrey	Pier Theatre, Bournemouth	Pier Theatre, Bournemouth
1978	Funny Peculiar	Mrs Baldry	Nottingham Playhouse	Nottingham Playhouse
1979	Saturday Sunday Morning		Royal Lyceum Company	Royal Lyceum Theatre, Edinburgh
1981	Habeas Corpus	Muriel Wicksteed	Royal Lyceum Theatre Edinburgh	Royal Lyceum Theatre, Edinburgh

=== Television ===
Year	Title	Role	Notes
1949	My Mother Said	Mirabelle	Television film
1954	The Javanese Dagger	Wanda - Tresall's 1st Wife	Short
1955	Scotland Yard	Hotel guest	Episode: "Murder Anonymous"
1955	Song of Norway		Short
1955	Theatre Royal	Mary Smith	Episode: "The Little Black Book"
1956	Scotland Yard	Nina Hartier	Episode: "The Wall of Death"
1956	Adventure Theater	Wanda	Episode: "The Javanese Dagger"
1956	The Other Man	Billie Reynolds	2 episodes
1956	Without Love	Sylvia	Television film
1957–1963	ITV Television Playhouse	Miss Summerfield / Madge Tullis / May Vine	3 episodes
1957	Many Mansions	Susan Brown	Television film
1957	Shadow Squad	Stella Curtis	2 episodes
1957–1959	The Vise	Edwina / Nurse	2 episodes
1958	The Killing Stones	Lucille Kleiber	Episode: "The Carefulness of Kleiber"
1958	Television Playwright	Laura	Episode: "Liberty Hall"
1958–1959	Dial 999	Mary / Margaret	2 episodes
1958	Starr and Company	Mrs. Kay	2 episodes
1958	Private Investigator	Mrs. Raffanole	Episode: "The Villa St. Yves"
1958–1959	Sunday Night Theatre	Babs Coates / Commander's Wife	2 episodes
1959	Murder Bag		Episode: "Lockheart Breaks Even"
1959	Campion	Chloe Pye	2 episodes
1959	Nick of the River	Laida	Episode: "Oranges and Lemons"
1959	Knight Errant Limited	Drazin	Episode: "Adam Meets His Match"
1959	Emergency Ward 10	Mrs. Rendell	Episode: "Episode #1.296"
1960	Armchair Theatre	Grace Warren	Episode: "The Girl in the Market Square"
1960	Man from Interpol	Diane	Episode: "Latest Fashion in Crime"
1960–1962	No Hiding Place	Patsy Baines / Moira Forbes	2 episodes
1960–1962	Edgar Wallace Mysteries	Mrs. Ferber / Betty Conlon	2 episodes
1961	Coronation Street	Hilda Wardle	1 episode
1961	Around the Corner	Stella Palmer	Television film
1961	Three Live Wires		Episode: "Stranger Than Fiction"
1961	The Cheaters	Mrs. Little / First Matron	2 episodes
1961	Magnolia Street	Maggie Tawnie	4 episodes
1961	Probation Officer	Mrs. Goodwin	Episode: "Episode #3.5"
1961	Family Solicitor	Mrs. Anderson	Episode: "The Battle of Tanley Corner"
1962–1964	ITV Play of the Week	Mrs. Boone / Rosie / Margaret	3 episodes
1962	Silent Evidence	Viv	Episode: "Shadow of the Past"
1962	The Danny Thomas Show	Mavis	Episode: "A Hunting We Will Go"
1963	Taxi!	Madeleine	Episode: "It's Lonely Up Front"
1963	The Scales of Justice	Agnes Chester	Episode: "The Undesirable Neighbour"
1963–1973	Z-Cars	Mona Hodson / Mrs. Hartley	2 episodes
1963	Maigret	Madame Laboine	Episode: "The Lost Life"
1963	Dixon of Dock Green	Rosie Shaw-Browne / Rosie Brown / Mrs. Perry	3 episodes
1963	The Saint	Tina Ourley	Episode: "The Rough Diamonds"
1964	Festival	Prudence	Episode: "The Lady of the Camellias"
1964	Sergeant Cork	Mrs. Whibley	Episode: "The Case of the Dumb Witness"
1964	Detective	Dagmar Candour	Episode: "Death in Ecstasy"
1964	The Third Man	Miss Muffin	Episode: "A Question in Ice"
1964	The Four Seasons of Rosie Carr	Mrs. Quorn	Episode: "Spring at the Winged Horse"
1964	The Hidden Truth	Betty Cleaves	Episode: "The Achilles Heel"
1964	The Indian Tales of Rudyard Kipling	Mrs. Herriot	Episode: "The Rescue of Pluffles"
1964	Gideon's Way	Charlotte Borgman	Episode: "To Catch a Tiger"
1964	Crane	Ida Lewis	Episode: "The Man with the Big Feet"
1966	Dr. Finlay's Casebook	Alison Canning	Episode: "Hear No Evil"
1966–1969	The Newcomers	Katie Heenan	273 episodes
1971	Never Mind the Quality, Feel the Width	Mary Appleton	Episode: "You Will Go to the Ball, Manny Cohen"
1971	Crime of Passion	Madame Leclerc	Episode: "Louis"
1972	General Hospital	Edith Bishop	5 episodes
1973	Bless This House	Virginia	Episode: "Tea for Two and Four for Tea"
1973	Full House	Maria in On the High Road	Episode: "Episode #1.22"
1973	ITV Sunday Night Theatre	Amy Cooper	Episode: "Reckoning Day"
1974	Pianorama		Short
1975	Ten from the Twenties	Mrs. Dickson	Episode: "The Fifty Pound Note"
1975–1978	I Didn't Know You Cared	Mrs. Partington	9 episodes
1975	Kim & Co.	Mrs. Hansen	Episode: "Doublecross"
1977	Hazlitt in Love	Edinburgh prostitute	Television film
1977	Rough Justice	Angela May Brownes	Episode: "Irretrievable Breakdown"
1979	In Loving Memory	Elsie Unsworth	Episode: "The Legacy"
1980	Cowboys	Mrs. Hill	Episode: "Black Day at Bad Rock"
1982	Minder	Queenie	Episode: "Looking for Micky"
1983	Reilly, Ace of Spies	Woman	Episode: "An Affair with a Married Woman"

=== Radio ===
Year	Title	Role	Station	Notes
1950	Saturday Night Theatre	Lulu Smith	BBC Home Service	Episode: "Shooting Star"
1950	Monday Matinee	Lulu Smith	BBC Light Programme	Episode: "Shooting Star"
1956	Sunday Theatre: The Atom Bowler		BBC Light Programme	2 episodes
1957	The Dancers	Velma	BBC Home Service, BBC Light Programme	2 episodes
1957	Maigret and the Lost Life	Jeanine	BBC Home Service	
1958	Until the Day She Dies	Sibelle	BBC Light Programme	2 episodes
1971	Dr Finlay's Caseybook	Alison Canning	BBC Radio 4	
1973	John Dunn	Mrs Marsh	BBC Radio 2	2 episodes

=== Film ===
Year	Title	Role	Notes
1953	Flannelfoot	Angela Neilson	
1953	The Large Rope	Amy Jordan	
1954	Johnny on the Spot	Diane Townley	
1955	The Brain Machine	Mae Smith	
1955	The Atomic Man	Stenographer	
1957	Hour of Decision	Eileen Chadwick	
1958	Innocent Sinners	Lovejoy's Mother	
1959	Horrors of the Black Museum	Miss Ashton	
1959	No Safety Ahead		Uncredited
1959	In the Wake of a Stranger	Hetty McCabe	
1959	Upstairs and Downstairs	Buxom Train Passenger	Uncredited
1960	Hell Is a City	Lucretia 'Lucky' Lusk	
1960	The Man Who Was Nobody	Mrs. Ferber	
1960	Sword of Sherwood Forest	The Prioress	
1961	Payroll	Doll	
1961	Konga	Bob's Mother	
1961	The Shadow of the Cat	Louise Venable	
1961	The Frightened City	Sophie Peters	
1961	Night Without Pity	Tart	
1962	Waltz of the Toreadors	Emma Bulstrode	
1962	Candidate for Murder	Betty Conlon	
1962	The Pot Carriers	Mrs. Red Band	
1962	Term of Trial	Mrs. Thompson	
1963	This Sporting Life	Mrs. Weaver	
1963	The Wrong Arm of the Law	Annette	
1963	80,000 Suspects	Mrs. Agnes Davis	
1963	Bitter Harvest	Mrs. Pitt	
1963	The Victors	Nurse	Uncredited
1963	Clash by Night	Mrs. Grey-Simmons	
1964	A Shot in the Dark	Madame LaFarge	
1964	The Earth Dies Screaming	Violet Courtland	
1965	Dateline Diamonds	Mrs. Jenkins	
1966	The Wrong Box	Mrs. Goodge	
1966	Who Killed the Cat?	Eleanor Trellington	
1970	A Touch of the Other	Angela	
1976	The Pink Panther Strikes Again	Mrs. Leverlilly	
