= John Forbes-Robertson =

John Forbes-Robertson may refer to:

- Johnston Forbes-Robertson (1853–1937), British stage actor, noted as Hamlet
- John Forbes-Robertson (actor) (1928–2008), British film actor, Dracula in The Legend of the 7 Golden Vampires
