= Television Playwright =

British TV anthology series (1958–1959)

- Genre: Drama; Anthology; Television play
- Country of origin: United Kingdom
- Original language: English

Original release
- Network: BBC 1
- Release: 8 April 1958 – 26 March 1959

Television Playwright is a British television anthology series which aired from 1958 to 1959 on the BBC. Of the 29 episodes, only three are known to survive as early examples of British television drama.

== Episodes ==
Episode title	Original air date (UK)	Playwright	Guest cast
The Confession	8 April 1958		Robert Harris, Marian Spencer, Elvi Hale, Andre Dakar, Newton Blick, Helena Pickard
Call Me a Liar	22 April 1958		Cornell Borchers, Alec McCowen, Elwyn Brook-Jones, George Benson, Rita Webb, Damaris Hayman, Tony Sympson, Charles Farrell, Peter Bathurst, Mark Heath
The Transmogrification of Chester Brown	29 April 1958		David Gardner, Lois Maxwell, Robert Perceval, Alan Keith, Guy Kingsley Poynter, Larry Burns, Patrick Connor
The Waiting Room	6 May 1958		Sheila Burrell, Lesley Nunnerley, Rachel Thomas, Mary Hinton, Joseph Greig, John Hollis
The Maitland Scandal	13 May 1958		Helen Shingler, Carl Bernard, Shelagh Fraser, Glyn Dearman, Peter Copley, Geoffrey Frederick
Liberty Hall	3 June 1958		Nicolette Bernard, James Ottaway, Jill Freud, Derek Birch, Marion Mathie, Anthony Shaw, Vanda Godsell
And Her Romeo	10 June 1958		Zena Walker, Paul Massie, Christine Finn, Hugh David, Monica Stevenson, Laidman Browne
The Brittle Bond	17 June 1958		Freda Bamford, John Barrett, Esme Beringer, Sheila Burrell, Hamilton Dyce, Paddi Edwards, Frederick Leister, Ralph Nossek, Hal Osmond, Julian Somers, Douglas Wilmer, John G. Heller, Roy Purcell
Afternoon for Antigone	24 June 1958		Esmond Knight, Gwen Watford, Violet Carson, Frank Atkinson
This Day in Fear	1 July 1958		Patrick McGoohan, Billie Whitelaw, Allan McClelland, Kevin Stoney, Donal Donnelly, David Morrell, Hugh Moxey, Harold Berens, Bartlett Mullins, Paddy Joyce, Gladys Spencer
A Game for Eskimos	8 July		Siân Phillips, Ewen Solon, Richard Peel, Geoffrey Matthews, Edward Malin
High-Blown Lady			Joseph Tomelty, Kevin Scott, Eira Heath, Lorna Henderson, Delia Corrie, Rex Robinson, John Harvey
The House Opposite	29 July 1958		Alan Webb, Jessica Dunning, Richard Leech, Jean Theobald
Red Rose for Ransom	12 August 1958	Ada F. Kay	Joby Blanshard, Nan Marriott-Watson, Joyce Marlow, Brian Peck, Marian Dawson, Brian Rawlinson, Betty Alberge, Philip Latham, Guy Kingsley Poynter, Rosalie Williams, John Barrie
The Marrying of Milly	19 August 1958		George Margo, Katherine Kath, E. Kerrigan Prescott, Warren Mitchell, Catherine Feller, Garry Thorne
Thirty Pieces of Silver	26 August 1958		Joan Miller, Leonard Sachs, Gerard Heinz, Arnold Marlé, Clifford Elkin, Ann Hanslip
The Inside Chance	2 September 1958		Michael Denison, Jack Allen, Peter Bryant, Leslie French, Hugh McDermott, Helen Jessop, Jennifer Browne, Peter Stephens, Geoffrey Tyrrell, Philip Howard, Beatrice Varley, Victor Brooks
The Commentator	16 September 1958		Cec Linder, John Loder, Roland Brand, Rose Alba, Robert Perceval, Gaylord Cavallaro, Robert Henderson, Michael Caridia, Leslie French, Reed De Rouen, John Bay, Alec Wallis
Hour of the Rat	23 September 1958		Clifford Evans, John Longden, Lee Montague, George Skillan, Peter Halliday, Leonard Sharp, Frank Forsyth, John Richmond, Peter Copley, Hugh David, Anthony Woodruff, Russell Waters, Arnold Bell
The Board of Management	5 November 1958		Peter Soule, Patricia Tarjan, Peggy Thorpe-Bates, David Markham, Peter Copley, Edith Sharpe, Maurice Colbourne
A Bouquet for the President	2 December 1958		Derek Farr, Peter Illing, Helen Shingler, Marne Maitland, Michael O'Brien, Leonard White, Walter Randall
In a Backward Country	30 December 1958		Wilfrid Lawson, William Russell, Walter Hudd, Dorothy Bromiley, Jack Hedley, Christopher Burgess, Cyril Shaps, Pearl Prescod
The Dark Side of the Earth	3 January 1959		Graham Rowe, Paul Hansard, Patrick Parnell, George Pravda, George Murcell, John Carson, Katherine Kath, Sandor Elès, Richard Marner, Steve Plytas, Sydney Bromley, Jerome Willis, Leonard White, Anthony Jacobs, Victor Beaumont, Neil McCarthy, Walter Gotell, George Mikell, Michael Caine, Bruce Wightman, Norman Jones, Bart Allison, John Bay
High Fidelity	15 January 1959		Andrew Osborn, Rosemary Miller, Kathleen Michael, Paul Eddington
Ice Blink	3 February 1959		Fred Johnson, Philip Latham, Barry Letts, Ian Keill, Leonard Williams, David Scase
Skeleton in the Sand	10 February 1959		Lyndon Brook, Patrick Allen, Victor Maddern, Barry Warren, Gerard Heinz, John Sharplin, Brian Peck
No Through Line	17 February 1959	Ada F. Kay	William Squire, Sheila Ballantine, Michael Warre, Betty Cooper, Greta Watson, George Woodbridge, John Horsley, Jeremy Geidt, Harry Littlewood, John Ringham
Sammy's Consent	24 February 1959		John Pike, Michael Aldridge, Naomi Chance
The Birthday	3 March 1959		Helen Cherry, Jack Allen, Tim Seely, Janet Joye, Angela Crow, Carole Lorimer
Walk on the Grass	26 March 1959		Frank Pettingell, Rosemary Miller, Mark Dignam, Paul Taylor, Joan Haythorne, Ethel Coleridge, Sheila Raynor, Ian Hendry, Brian Peck
