= Edward Cast =

British actor (1925–1994)

- Born: Edward Raymond Cast; 2 March 1925; London, England
- Died: December 1994 (aged 69); Westminster, London, England
- Occupation: Actor

Edward Raymond Cast (1925–1994) was a British stage, film and television actor.

== Filmography ==
=== Film ===
Year	Title	Role	Notes
1954	Front Page Story	Flight Attendant	uncredited
1954	Father Brown	Seated Constable at Police Station	uncredited
1955	The Dam Busters	Crew Member	uncredited
1955	Josephine and Men	Motorcycle Policeman	uncredited
1956	Private's Progress	Intelligence Officer	uncredited
1956	The Long Arm	Police Constable - Information Room	uncredited
1957	These Dangerous Years	Desk Sergeant	uncredited
1957	The One That Got Away	Duty Driver, Hucknall	uncredited
1959	Tiger Bay	Detective Constable Thomas	
1959	Deadly Record	Constable Ryder	
1959	Blind Date	Police Officer at Airport	uncredited
1960	Linda	Vicar	
1960	The Professionals	Clayton	
1960	Snowball	Frank Martin	
1961	Payroll	Detective Sergeant Bradden	
1961	Seven Keys	Bank Clerk	uncredited
1963	The Cracksman	Prison Officer	uncredited
1963	Dr. Crippen	Warder Harding	
1963	It's All Happening	Hugh	
1964	Seventy Deadly Pills	Police Constable Weaver	
1964	The Comedy Man	Director at Film Shoot	uncredited
1967	Doctor Dolittle	Prison Guard	uncredited
1969	The Chairman	Audio Room Technician	
1971	10 Rillington Place	Plainclothes Sergeant	uncredited
1971	Quest for Love	Jenkins	

=== Television ===
Year	Title	Role	Notes
1954	Dear Dotty	Squadron Leader John Dearing	Episode: "Cardinal Puff Puff Rides Again"
1955	Colonel March of Scotland Yard	Carter	Episode: "Passage at Arms"
1956	The Adventures of the Big Man	Danny	Episode: "The Bomb"
1956-1957	Armchair Theatre	Jim Taylor / Sergeant / Neville Hammond / Edgar Jenkins	4 episodes
1957	Assignment Foreign Legion	Captain Dupont	Episode: "A Pony for Joe Crazy Horse"
1957	Hour of Mystery	Jim Stobart	Episode: "No Charge for the Proof"
1957-1961	ITV Television Playhouse	John Leek / Jackson / Joseph / Mr. Hadley	4 episodes
1958	Schlitz Playhouse of Stars	George Chappel	Episode: "Secrets of the Old Bailey"
1958	Starr and Company	Rocky	11 episodes
1959	ITV Play of the Week	Sergeant Hulet	Episode: "The Killing of the King"
1959	Charlesworth	Milton	2 episodes
1959	Nick of the River	Sergeant Watkins	2 episodes
1959	A Mask for Alexis	Detective Sergeant Edwards	6 episodes
1959	Interpol Calling	Police Officer	Episode: "The Angola Brights"
1959	The Flying Doctor	Joe Parsons	Episode: "The Conspiracy"
1959-1967	No Hiding Place	Sergeant / Joe Reynolds / Manager / Kevan Walsh / Alex / Inspector Wood	6 episodes
1959	Scotland Yard	Sergeant Webster	Episode: "The Dover Road Mystery"
1960	Probation Officer	Detective Sergeant Ryan	1 episode
1960	International Detective	Bartolomeo	Episode: "The Santino Case"
1960	Campion	Tommy Dacre	Episode: "Death of a Ghost"
1960	The Edgar Wallace Mystery Theatre	Laker	Episode: "The Malpas Mystery"
1961	Adventure Story	Perdiccas	
1961	Sir Francis Drake	Captain of the Guard	Episode: "Doctor Dee"
1961	Armchair Theatre	Smudge	Episode: "Looking for Frankie"
1961-1962	Ghost Squad	Peter / Stage Manager	2 episodes
1962	BBC Sunday-Night Play	Bob Mitchell	Episode: "This Happy Breed"
1962	Top Secret	Colonel Rodrigo	Episode: "The Second Man"
1963	Crane	Guard	Episode: "Three Days to Die"
1963	Man of the World	Pec	Episode: "In the Picture"
1963	Sergeant Cork	Albert Parry	Episode: "The Case of the Respectable Suicide"
1963	Zero One	Harry	Episode: "Hurricane"
1963	Espionage	'Torture Chamber' Recruit	Episode: "The Weakling"
1964	Gideon's Way	Detective Sergeant	Episode: "The 'V' Men"
1965	ITV Sunday Night Drama	Second Man	Episode: "A Tall, Stalwart Lancer"
1965	The Saint	Alexander Bellamy	Episode: "The Frightened Inn-Keeper"
1965	Compact	Mr. Parry	3 episodes
1965	The Flying Swan	Inspector Frobisher	Episode: "Angel Space"
1965	Emergency Ward 10	Mr. Esmond Elden	2 episodes
1965	The Avengers	Waiter	Episode: "Dial a Deadly Number"
1966	Danger Man	Rossi	Episode: "The Contessa"
1967	Armchair Theatre	Johnson	Episode: "England My England"
1967	George and the Dragon	Man in restaurant	Episode: "Friendship Bureau"
1967-1968	The Newcomers	Mr. Elliot / Archie Pringle	5 episodes
1968	Thirty-Minute Theatre	Sergeant Baker	2 episodes
1968	The Champions	Haley	Episode: "Twelve Hours"
1969	The Troubleshooters	Andrew Frazer	Episode: "You're Not Going to Believe This, But..."
1969	Strange Report	Llewellyn	Episode: "REPORT 0649 SKELETON 'Let Sleeping Heroes Lie'"
1969	Department S	Hallam	Episode: "The Duplicated Man"
1971	Paul Temple	Jack Radford	Episode: "Winner Take All"
1971	Owen, M.D.	Freddie Penfold	Episodes: "The Birdwatcher" (part 1 and 2)
1974	The Zoo Gang	Major	Episode: "African Misfire"
1977	Mr. Big	Bank Manager	Episode: "The Bank Job"
1978	Law & Order	Governor Maudling	Episode: "A Prisoner's Tale"
1985	Crossroads	Sir William Mowbray	1 episode
1989	Screen One	Sir Robert	Episode: "Blore M.P."
