= Frank Pettitt =

English actor (1899–1964)

- as Barman in Victim (1961)
- Born: Frank Milne Pettitt; 16 October 1899; Bucklow, Cheshire, England, U.K.
- Died: 27 March 1964 (aged 64); Harrow, Middlesex, England, U.K.
- Years active: 1949–1964

Frank Pettitt (16 October 1899 – 27 March 1964) was an English film, stage and television actor.

He played Albert Finney's father in the film Saturday Night and Sunday Morning (1960).

== Filmography ==
=== Film ===
Year	Title	Role	Notes
1950	Night and the City	Cabby	uncredited
1954	Face the Music	Constable	uncredited
1957	The Heart Within	3rd Constable	
1960	Saturday Night and Sunday Morning	Mr. Seaton	
1961	Victim	Barman	
1961	The Kitchen	Frank	
1962	Emergency	Sergeant Blakeley	uncredited
1962	The Pot Carriers	Van Driver	
1962	Serena	Fred	
1963	Impact	Sid the foreman	
1963	A Matter of Choice	Police Sergeant	

=== Television ===
Year	Title	Role	Notes
1952	The Three Hostages		Episode: "The First of June"
1952	My Wife Jacqueline	Police Constable	Episode: "The Mysterious Complaint"
1955	The Vise	Cameraman (uncredited)	Episode: "The Verdict"
1955	Sunday Night Theatre	2nd Worker	Episode: "The Makepeace Story #2: A New Generation"
1957	Sunday Night Theatre	Sergeant Morris	Episode: "Laburnum Grove"
1958	Starr and Company	Connors	2 episodes
1959	Charlesworth	2nd Prison Officer / Inspector Vaile	2 episodes
1959	The Adventures of Brigadier Wellington-Bull	Head waiter	Episode: "A Party Matter"
1959	Gert and Daisy		1 episode
1959	The Voodoo Factor	Jim, the Policeman	Episode: "The Malayan"
1960	Probation Officer	Police Constable	1 episode
1960	Arthur's Treasured Volumes	Man in shop	Episode: "A Blow in Anger"
1960	Theatre 70	Sergeant Rouse	Episode: "Full Circle"
1960	The World of Tim Frazer	PC Muir	1 episode
1960	The Strange World of Gurney Slade	Actor	1 episode
1961	Deadline Midnight	Inspector	Episode: "Manhunt"
1961	Coronation Street	Driver / Coach Driver	2 episodes
1961	Drama 61-67	Police Inspector	Episode: "The Face of the Enemy"
1963	Suspense	Sergeant	Episode: "The Man on the Bicycle"
1963	Bootsie and Snudge	Police Sergeant	Episode: "Small Back Garden"
1963	The Plane Makers	Robbo	Episode: "Who Goes First?"
1963	Taxi!	Porter	Episode: "The Runaway"
1963	No Hiding Place	Swallow	Episode: "An Eye on the Kings"
1963	Comedy Playhouse	Alf Stringer	Episode: "A Picture of Innocence"
1963	Drama 61-67	Jack	Episode: "Eyes Down and Look In"
1964	Detective	Duty Constable	Episode: "The Drawing"
