= Serena (1962 film) =

1962 British film by Peter Maxwell

- Title card
- Directed by: Peter Maxwell
- Written by: Edward Abraham; Valerie Abraham; Reginald Hearne
- Produced by: John I. Phillips
- Starring: Patrick Holt; Emrys Jones; Honor Blackman
- Cinematography: Stephen Dade
- Edited by: Allan Morrison
- Music by: John Gregory
- Production company: Butcher's Film Service
- Distributed by: Butcher's Film Service
- Release date: October 11, 1962; (UK)
- Running time: 60 min.
- Country: United Kingdom
- Language: English

Serena is a 1962 British black-and-white second feature ('B') crime thriller directed by Peter Maxwell, starring Patrick Holt, Emrys Jones and Honor Blackman. It was written by Edward Abraham, Valerie Abraham and Reginald Hearne.

== Plot ==
Detective Chief Inspector Gregory from Scotland Yard, and his partner, Sergeant Conway, are called in to investigate the shotgun murder of a woman at Rosehill Cottage, a remote Surrey cottage. The victim appears to be Ann Rogers, wife of womanising artist Howard Rogers. Her face is so badly disfigured by the two shotgun blasts that it is hard to be sure of her identity. Rogers looks for a birthmark that would positively prove the body belongs to his wife, but it is not there.

At first, Gregory had considered Rogers as the chief suspect, but his alibi proves he is innocent. When Ann suddenly shows up, the identity of the murdered woman may rest on her friend, Claire Matthews, who is missing. A search for both the artist's mistress, Serena Vaughan, and the missing woman, intensifies, but Ann's motivations are also suspect. One of the women may know the truth.

== Cast ==
- Patrick Holt as Inspector Gregory
- Emrys Jones as Howard Rogers
- Honor Blackman as Ann Rogers
- Bruce Beeby as Sergeant Conway
- John Horsley as Mr. Fisher
- Robert Perceval as bank manager
- Wally Patch as barman
- Gerry Duggan as Norman Cole
- Peter Glaze as station booking clerk
- Howard Greene as River Police Sergeant
- Reginald Hearne as doctor
- Lawrence James as Uniformed Constable
- Benedicta Leigh as Policewoman Scott
- Barry Linehan as forensic chemist
- Bill Mills as photographer
- Frank Pettitt as Fred
- Colin Rix as Plainclothes Detective
- Raymond Smith as River Police Constable
- Pat Shaw as Uniformed Policewoman

== Production ==
Principal photography took place on location in Surrey and at Shepperton Studios, Shepperton, Surrey, England.

== Critical reception ==
Monthly Film Bulletin said "Harking back in plot and presentation to the Danziger era of British second features, this film is nevertheless quite entertainingly done on its own level. The script manages one or two neat twists, and irritates only through a misguided determination to establish every character by an obtrusive trick of speech (the inspector, for instance, has to urge on his driver with "chop-chop" every time he gets in the car). Acting and direction are competent, and the glimpses of sophisticated life in the world of art will appeal to connoisseurs."

TV Guide gave Serena two out of five stars, calling it a "Basic programmer with a plot more clever than most"; and Allmovie called the film an "interesting mystery."

The Time Out Film Guide described the film as "stagey" and, "[a] not very taxing mystery."

The Radio Times Guide to Films gave the film 3/5 stars, writing: "Rising well above the usual quota-quickie standards, this entertaining little whodunnit shoehorns about two hours of plot into its short running time. Directed at a fair lick by Peter Maxwell, it revolves around the complicated sex life of smoothie artist Emrys Jones, who wants to leave his wife for his model mistress. When the body of an unknown woman is found in a country cottage, inspector Patrick Holt is called in to investigate."

== Releases ==
The film was released on DVD in 2011 in a double package with Impact (1963), also directed by Peter Maxwell.
