= Alec Clunes =

English actor and theatrical manager (1912–1970)

- Born: Alexander Sheriff de Moro Clunes; 17 May 1912; Brixton, London, England
- Died: 13 March 1970 (aged 57); London, England
- Occupations: Actor, director
- Spouse(s): Stella Richman (divorced); Daphne Acott (1956–1970; his death)
- Children: 2, including Martin Clunes

Alexander Sheriff de Moro Clunes (17 May 1912 – 13 March 1970) was an English actor and theatrical manager.

Among the plays he presented were Christopher Fry's The Lady's Not for Burning. He gave the actor and dramatist Peter Ustinov his first break with his production The House of Regrets. His film career was brief, but varied. He played Hastings in Laurence Olivier's Richard III (1955), and also appeared in wartime films such as One of Our Aircraft Is Missing (1942), although he was in fact a conscientious objector. He also appeared in The Adventures of Quentin Durward (1955).

In 1958 he was offered the lead part of Bernard Quatermass in the BBC science-fiction serial Quatermass and the Pit, but declined the role: André Morell was cast instead.

Clunes' later stage work included succeeding Rex Harrison as Henry Higgins in the stage musical My Fair Lady in 1959. His final stage appearance was in 1968.

== Early and personal life ==
Alexander Sheriff de Moro Clunes was born on 17 May 1912 to a show business family, he was the son of Alexander Sydenham Sherriff Clunes (1881–1960) and Georgina Ada Sumner (1882–1969). He began his stage career with Ben Greet's company before playing at the Old Vic theatre in 1934. He played numerous Shakespearian roles, before taking over the management of the Arts Theatre, London in 1942, where he remained until 1950. He later ran a theatre bookshop in Cecil Court.

He was twice married: to actress Stella Richman, later a television producer, and Daphne Gillian Acott, with whom he had one son, actor Martin Clunes.

Clunes died from lung cancer on 13 March 1970, aged 57.

== Filmography ==
Year	Title	Role	Notes
1940	Convoy		Uncredited
1940	Let George Do It!	Officer	Uncredited
1940	Saloon Bar	Eddie Graves	
1940	Sailors Three	British Pilot	
1942	One of Our Aircraft Is Missing	The Organist	
1949	Now Barabbas	Gale	
1952	La Bergère et le Ramoneur	The Blind Man	English version, voice role
1953	Melba	Cesar Carlton	
1955	The Adventures of Quentin Durward	Charles – Duke of Burgundy	
1955	Brighton Story (BFI film)	Narrator	
1955	Richard III	The Lord Hastings	
1956	Tiger in the Smoke	Asst. Commissioner Oates	
1956	The Buccaneers	Governor Woodes Rogers	Lead role, first three episodes
1963	Tomorrow at Ten	Anthony Chester	
1965	Undermind	Police Sergeant	Episode: "Onset of Fear"
1968	The Ronnie Barker Playhouse	Peregrine	Episode: "The Incredible Mister Tanner"
