= Ray Rigby (screenwriter) =

British screenwriter

Ray Rigby (b.1916, Rochford, Essex, England – May 19, 1995, Guadalajara, Mexico) was a British screenwriter and novelist.

== Career ==
He is mainly known for The Hill, a searing account of an abusive military prison, which was directed by Sidney Lumet and was greeted with critical acclaim, winning the Best Screenplay award at the 1965 Cannes Film Festival, an honour also bestowed by the Writers' Guild of Great Britain the following year, when it also won a BAFTA for Best Screenplay. The film was inspired by Rigby's own experience in a British military prison in World War II when he spent two terms in field punishment detention centres. He co-wrote the film Operation Crossbow, also released in 1965.

Throughout the 1950s and 1960s he worked for several of the major Hollywood studios writing for top TV series, including Starr and Company and The Avengers.

Rigby published a novel of the story of The Hill in 1965. Hill of Sand was written as a follow-up. Jackson's War dealt with similar themes. Other novels include Jackson's Peace and Jackson's England.

Author Tony Burton, who knew Rigby, said he was "a born raconteur, with keen street-smarts and a ready wit. Author Alex Gratton was not exaggerating when he described Ray in a memorial piece as a "world class wit and a fabulous story teller".

Rigby left Hollywood behind in 1972 and moved to Mexico, settling in Guadalajara, where he married for the fifth and final time, and lived until his death in 1995, at the age of 78.
