= Delia Corrie =

British actress (born 1937)

- Born: 8 September 1937 (age 89); Bombay, India
- Education: Royal Academy of Dramatic Art
- Occupation: Actress
- Spouse: Michael Thomas (m. 1962)

Delia Mary Corrie (born September 8, 1937) is a British actress and a voice artist.

== Life ==
Delia Corrie trained at RADA, graduating in 1957.

She has worked widely in the theatre, including the West End, Hampstead, Richmond, Worthing, Liverpool, Windsor and Royal Exchange Theatres and the Library in Manchester. Corrie appeared in stage productions such as Zuleika by James Ferman and Peter Tranchell, Cider With Rosie by James Roose-Evans, and Don Carlos by Friedrich von Schiller.

Her TV credits include Emergency Ward 10, The Avengers, Coronation Street and The Wind in the Willows.

Corrie has also done extensive radio work: documentaries, plays, short stories and poetry readings.

For several years she was the 2 voice for the BBC's On This Day and What The Papers Say. She has also voiced promos for Discovery Channel, and documentaries including All Our Yesterdays, World in Action, and Despatches.

== Filmography ==
=== Television ===
Year	Title	Role	Notes
1957	Mister Charlesworth	Secretary	Episode: "Once a Copper..."
1958	Television Playwright	Sailor's Girl	Episode: "High-Blown Lady"
1961	Probation Officer	Second Young Woman	Episode 2.38
1962	Compact	Elspeth	Episode: "Efficiency Expert"
1962	Emergency Ward 10	Angela MacGregor	Several episodes
1962	The Avengers	Miss Power	Episode: "The Mauritius Penny"
1962	No Hiding Place	Janet Greer	Episode: "Unfinished Business"
1964	Z-Cars	Mrs. Woolf	Episode: "Centre of Disturbance"
1965	Armchair Mystery Theatre	Nurse Palmer	Episode: "Wake a Stranger"
1966	The Three Musketeers	Mme. Coquenard	2 episodes
1968	Ooh La La!	Clara	Episode: "What a Wedding"
1979	Crown Court	Court Reporter	3 episodes
1981	Coronation Street	Dr. Judith Hollins	2 episodes
1982	Strangers	Old Man's Wife	Episode: "A Much Underestimated Man"
1984-88	The Wind in the Willows		44 episodes
1985	Seaview	Molly	Episode: "Big Brother"
1987	Brookside	Vicar's wife	Episode: "Non-Active Status"
2001	Always and Everyone	Maggie	Episode: "Episode 3.3"
