= Katherine Parr (actress) =

British actress (1921–2009)

- Born: Lily Elizabeth Tindal; 1921; London, England
- Died: 20 September 2009 (aged 88); Kent, England
- Occupation: Actress
- Years active: 1959–1990
- Spouse: Dennis Caldwell (m. 1941)

Lily Elizabeth Caldwell (née Tindal, 1921 – 20 September 2009), known professionally as Katherine Parr, was a British actress, who played the recurring role of Irene Holloway, commonly known as Auntie Irene, in the BBC soap opera EastEnders, between 1986 and 1987, when her character died from lung cancer.

== Career ==
Parr's television appearances date back to the late-1950s, when she made her screen debut as Joan Stringer on the series Emergency – Ward 10. She went on to appear in several popular television shows including Coronation Street (1963), appearing for seven episodes as Amy Preston. She also appeared in the 1963 film This Sporting Life.

She has also appeared in various other television shows including The Wednesday Play, Softly, Softly, Z-Cars, Dixon of Dock Green and The Sweeney.

In 1986, she was cast in the role of Irene Holloway, commonly known as Auntie Irene, in the soap opera EastEnders, which had been commissioned one year before Parr's arrival on the show. Parr's role in the show was as the elderly cancer-stricken aunt of established character Lofty Holloway (Tom Watt). She made her final appearance on the show on the 16 June 1987, and her character died off-screen two days later.

Parr played Mrs Penny in the BBC radio drama David Wade – Power of Attorney which was broadcast in 1990.

== Personal life ==
Parr was born in 1921 in London, England. She married writer Dennis Caldwell in 1941.

Parr died in Kent on 20 September 2009, at the age of 88.

== Selected filmography ==
=== Film ===
- This Sporting Life (1963) – Mrs. Farrer
- Otley (1970) – Newsagent
- Doomwatch (1972) – Middle-aged Woman

=== Television ===
- Starr and Company (1958, 16 episodes, as Rene Cremer)
- Three Golden Nobles (1959, 4 episodes, as Mother Bellinger)
- The Days of Vengeance (1960, 6 episodes, as Agnes Cranwell)
- Emergency – Ward 10 (1959, 1 episode, as Joan Stringer, 1965, 3 episodes, as Mrs. Hicks)
- Coronation Street (1967, 7 episodes, as Amy Preston)
- The Doctors (1969–1970, 10 episodes, as Gran Beckett)
- EastEnders (1986, 1987, 3 episodes, as Auntie Irene)
