= John Gregory (bandleader) =

British bandleader (1924–2020)

- Also known as: Chaquito, Nino Rico, Primo Rivera
- Born: Primino Giuseppe Giovanni Gregori; 12 October 1924; Camden Town, London, England
- Died: 23 April 2020 (aged 95) London, England
- Genres: Jazz, latin, film, easy listening, pop
- Years active: 1940s–circa 2000s

John Primo Gregory (born Primino Giuseppe Giovanni Gregori; 12 October 1924 – 23 April 2020) was a British bandleader who also recorded as Nino Rico and Chaquito.

== Life and career ==
Born on High Street, Camden Town, in north London on 12 October 1924, Primo Giovanni Giuseppe Gregori was one of five children of recent Italian immigrants Maria Louisa (née Rossi) and Francesco Gregori, the latter becoming the leader of a dance band that played at the Italian restaurant Quaglino's. Encouraged by his parents, who realised he was exceptionally musical, John studied the violin with the virtuoso teacher Alfredo Campoli and went on to take lessons in counterpoint and harmony at the London College of Music.

After a brief stint as a violinist with his father's band, by the late 1940s he was performing by himself and working as a staff arranger with Philips Records. His first broadcast as an arranger, for the BBC Revue Orchestra, aired in 1944. He was the BBC Radio Orchestra’s principal guest conductor for 17 years and continued to be recognised as one of the best and most innovative orchestral composers and arrangers of his time. He also collaborated with vocalists including Cleo Laine and Nana Mouskouri.

In the late 1950s, he recorded Latin-flavoured albums as Nino Rico, and then as Chaquito. In 1960, he began to make his own records, with The Cascading Strings, as part of the Philips record label's easy listening albums. More unusual was Melodies of Japan (1963), a reworking of the traditional folk music of the far east.

Into the 1980s, he regularly recorded under his own name, producing albums such as A Man for All Seasons and The Detectives. He won an Ivor Novello Award in 1976 for "Introduction and Air to a Stained Glass Window". From 1974 to 1991 he was the conductor of the BBC Radio Orchestra. He composed his last film score in 2002.

Gregory died on 23 April 2020, at the age of 95.

== Scores ==
He scored several films and TV shows, including Gaolbreak (1962), Strongroom (1962), Serena (1962), Impact (1963), Smokescreen (1964), The Night Caller (1965) and the television series Hark at Barker (1969-1970) and Don't Drink the Water (1974).

== Selected discography ==
- Nino Rico Plays Cha-Cha-Cha (as Nino Rico, 1957)
- Swinging Cha-Cha (as Chaquito, 1958)
- Melodies of Japan (1968)
- The Great Chaquito Revolution (as Chaquito, 1970)
- A Man for All Seasons (1975)
- The Detectives (1976)
