= Rosemary Johnson =

British actress (1913–1972)

- Born: Ann Rosemary Johnson; 18 January 1913; London, England
- Died: 10 November 1972 (aged 59); Cumbria, England
- Occupation: actress

Rosemary Johnson (1913–1972) was a British actress.

Ann Rosemary Johnson was born on 18 January 1913 in Balham in South West London. She was always known by her second name of Rosemary (and to many of her friends as ‘Rosie’). Her mother, Grace, was the daughter of a Presbyterian Minister, Rev John More. Her father, John Charles Johnson, was a physician and surgeon (practising in the partnership of Ker and Johnson) and from 1912-1919 the family resided at Gothic Lodge, 1 Old Devonshire Road.

After the First World War the Johnson family moved to Southbourne in Bournemouth. They lived in Pinewood Lodge, a substantial house in Stourwood Road, a couple of minutes walk from the sea.

Rosemary Johnson attended the Royal Academy of Dramatic Art from January 1930 to December 1931.

Her professional career began in repertory theatre and she is mentioned in Full and Frank: The Private Life of a Woman Novelist by Oliver Sandys. Johnson worked mostly in repertory theatre and a little in television.

After leaving RADA, she played her first season in Frinton and then joined the Aberystwyth-based repertory company run by Countess Barcynska (also known as Oliver Sandys). The company was billed as the Rogues and Vagabonds Repertory Company of West End artists in West End plays, although Sandys wrote in her memoir that its artists were not well known in the West End. Sandys also recalled that Johnson, then twenty, had acted since early childhood, and that she served her apprenticeship with the company before taking leading roles in Cardiff and Sheffield.

Life in Repertory was demanding. ‘The company travelled by motor coach, usually singing all the way and back again. A furniture van went ahead with scenery...Mondays it was Talybont (seven miles), Tuesdays, Borth (seven miles), Wednesdays, Lampeter (twenty-nine miles), Thursdays, Aberporth (thirty-three miles), Fridays, Aberdovery (twenty-eight miles), Saturdays, New Quay (twenty-three miles). They opened at Talybont Village Hall (to an all-Welsh audience) with Rosemary Johnson playing the title role in Noel Coward’s Marquise – ‘with fine theatrical subtlety’. Salaries ranged from £4 to £6 a week and the company got good mentions in The Western Mail and the Swansea Daily Post. They attracted enthusiastic Welsh audiences from miles around. In her memoir Oliver Sandys recalled how one young haymaker fainted in the theatre, having done a full day’s work and then cycled fifteen mile to see the Rogues and Vagabonds perform.

Two of the greatest periods of success in Rosemary Johnson’s theatrical career were with Sheffield and Northampton repertory companies. This is where she met and worked closely with the Producer, William Sherwood, which saw the beginning of a long love affair which endured the separation of the Second World War and led to their marriage in 1946.

In 1936 she played in a summer season show composed of a series of vignettes: Mrs Pearce in George Bernard Shaw’s Pygmalion; Mama in a couple of scenes from Rosie’s Repentance (which she also produced); the Dancer in The Dancer and the 2nd Lion in Nippies or The Lyons’ Removers. In September she played in Duet in Floodlight by J B Priestley, which William Sherwood produced and designed sets for. In November they performed Promise by Henry Bernstein in which Rosemary Johnson played Therese. In January 1937 they put on Richard of Bordeaux by Gordon Daviot in which Rosemary Johnson played Queen Anne of Bohemia.

In March 1938 Rosemary Johnson succeeded Helen Irving at Northampton, opening with Squaring the Circle. The programmed noted, ‘Miss Johnson comes to us with a wide experience in Repertory and has lately been at Cardiff and Sheffield’.

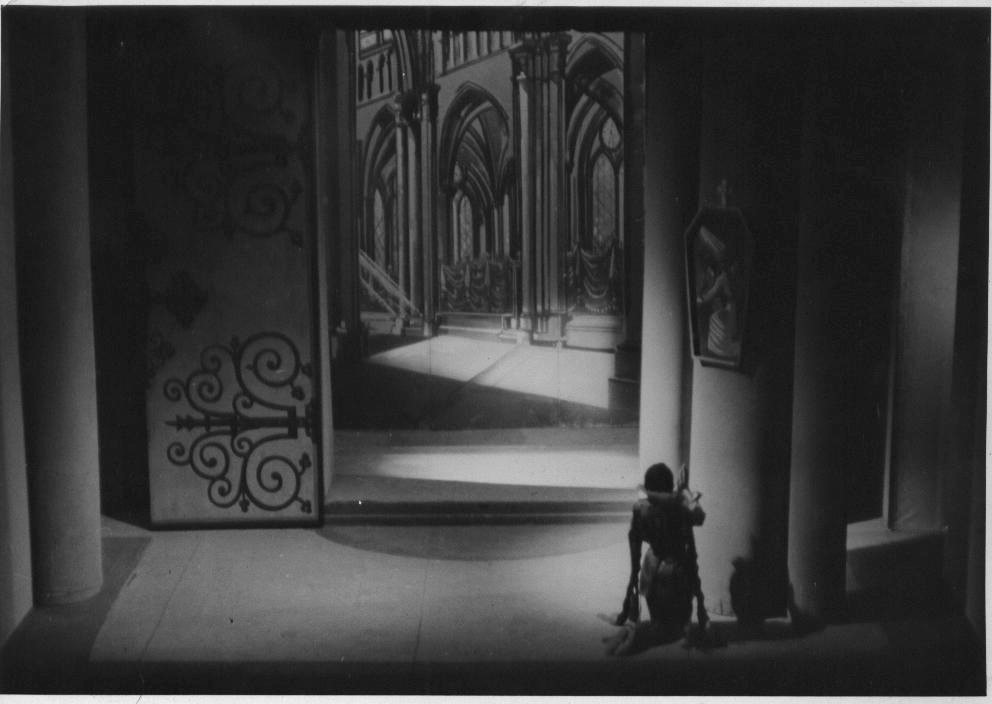

A notable role was as the telephone operator Hilda Rowse in the 1964 Doctor Who serial Planet of Giants.

== Filmography ==
Year	Title	Role	Notes
1958	Starr and Company	Maggie	Episode: Bank Holiday Outing
1959	The Common Room	woman	Episode: The Major
1960	Heller in Pink Tights	Tightrope-walker	uncredited
1964	Planet of Giants	Hilda Rowse	Episode: Crisis
1967	Champion House	Mrs Baker	Episode: The Suggestion Box
1971	Shadows of Fear	Marian	Episode: White Walls and Olive Green Carpets
