= Planet of Giants =

009 – Planet of Giants
- Doctor Who serial
- The miniaturised Susan and Ian encounter a normal-sized ant. Critics and viewers praised the serial's set design.

Cast
- Doctor: William Hartnell – First Doctor
- Companions: William Russell – Ian Chesterton; Jacqueline Hill – Barbara Wright; Carole Ann Ford – Susan Foreman
- Others: Alan Tilvern – Forester; Frank Crawshaw – Farrow; Reginald Barratt – Smithers; Rosemary Johnson – Hilda; Fred Ferris – Bert

Production
- Directed by: Mervyn Pinfield; Douglas Camfield (episode 3)
- Written by: Louis Marks
- Script editor: David Whitaker
- Produced by: Verity Lambert
- Music by: Dudley Simpson
- Production code: J
- Series: Season 2
- Running time: 3 episodes, 25 minutes each
- First broadcast: 31 October 1964
- Last broadcast: 14 November 1964

Chronology
| ← Preceded by The Reign of Terror | Followed by → The Dalek Invasion of Earth |

Planet of Giants is the first serial of the second season in the British science fiction television series Doctor Who. Written by Louis Marks and directed by Mervyn Pinfield and Douglas Camfield, the serial was first broadcast on BBC1 in three weekly parts from 31 October to 14 November 1964. In the serial, the First Doctor (William Hartnell), his granddaughter Susan Foreman (Carole Ann Ford), and her teachers Ian Chesterton (William Russell) and Barbara Wright (Jacqueline Hill) are shrunk to the size of an inch after the Doctor's time machine the TARDIS arrives in contemporary England.

The story's concept was first proposed as the first serial of the show's first season, but was rejected due to its technical complexity and lack of character development. When Marks was commissioned to write the script, he was inspired by Rachel Carson's 1962 environmental science book Silent Spring, the first major documentation on human impact on the environment. The story was originally written and filmed as a four-part serial, but later reduced to three parts; the third and fourth episodes were cut down to form a faster-paced climax. The serial premiered with 8.4 million viewers, maintaining audience figures throughout the three weeks. Retrospective response for the serial was mixed, with criticism directed at its story and characterisation despite praise for its ambition. It later received several print adaptations and home media releases.

== Plot ==
Despite indications of a malfunction in the TARDIS, its fault locator shows nothing is wrong and that it is safe to go outside. The First Doctor (William Hartnell), Ian Chesterton (William Russell), Barbara Wright (Jacqueline Hill), and Susan Foreman (Carole Ann Ford) consequently explore the vicinity, finding the remains of giant earthworm and ant, which appear to have died instantaneously. The travellers realise they have returned to Earth but have shrunk to the height of an inch. Ian investigates the interior of a discarded matchbox when it is picked up by a government scientist called Farrow (Frank Crawshaw), who is visiting a callous industrialist named Forester (Alan Tilvern) to tell him that his application for a new insecticide called DN6 has been rejected as it is far too deadly to all forms of insect life. News of this appraisal prompts Forester to fatally shoot Farrow. The Doctor, Barbara, and Susan hear the gunshot and head for the house to find Ian unhurt near Farrow's corpse.

Forester's aide, Smithers (Reginald Barratt), arrives but does not report the murder for fear of undermining the DN6 project to which he has dedicated his life. Ian and Barbara hide inside Farrow's briefcase to avoid being stepped on by Forester and Smithers, and get separated from the Doctor and Susan after the briefcase is brought inside the house. The Doctor and Susan climb up a drain pipe to find them. Forester alters Farrow's report to give support to the DN6 licence application and, disguising his voice as Farrow’s, makes a supportive phone call to the ministry to the same effect. This is overheard by the local telephone operator Hilda Rowse (Rosemary Johnson) and her policeman husband Bert (Fred Ferris), who suspect something is wrong.

Within the house, Ian and Barbara encounter a giant fly, which is killed instantly when it contacts sample seeds that had been sprayed with DN6. Barbara had handled one of these seeds and begins to feel unwell. The Doctor, realising the toxic nature of DN6 and the probable contamination of Barbara, proposes they alert someone by hoisting up the giant telephone receiver, but they cannot make themselves heard. At the telephone exchange, the engaged signal makes Hilda and Bert increasingly concerned. Bert heads off to the house to investigate. The Doctor and his companions decide to attract attention by starting a fire, succeeding in manoeuvring an aerosol can into the flames of the Bunsen burner gas outlet. This coincides with Smithers discovering the true virulence of DN6 and demanding Forester cease his licence application. In the lab, the makeshift bomb explodes in Forester’s face as PC Rowse arrives. Back in the TARDIS, the Doctor succeeds in returning the craft and crew to normal size, a process which cures Barbara of her infection by DN6.

== Production ==
=== Conception and writing ===
The concept of the Doctor and his companions shrinking in size was initially proposed as the first story of the show's first season, written by C. E. Webber and entitled The Giants. After some rewrites, the serial was rejected by show creator Sydney Newman in June 1963 due to its technical complexity and lack of character development. The concept of The Giants was given to writer Robert Gould in mid-1963 to develop as the four-part fourth serial of the first season, but it was dropped by January 1964 due to scripting difficulties. By February 1964, the serial was assigned to writer Louis Marks. The main narrative was inspired by Rachel Carson's 1962 environmental science book Silent Spring, the first major documentation on human impact on the environment. The fictional insecticide featured in the story, DN6, was inspired by incidents described by Carson regarding the impact of DDT on insects. Writer Mark Wilson wrote in 2017 that the story aired during a time when environmental awareness was beginning to develop among the British public. Whitaker commissioned Marks for the serial in May 1964, then titled The Planet of Giants. Mervyn Pinfield was assigned to direct the serial.

=== Filming ===
The special effect inserts of a cat were filmed on 30 July 1964 using silent 35mm film, with sound added later during a studio recording. The show's regular cast—Hartnell, Russell, Hill, and Ford—filmed the sequences in which they appeared alongside giant props; the effect was achieved by recording the actors through glass and reflecting the object onto a half-silvered mirror. The footage was later deemed unsatisfactory, and the scenes were re-shot on 13 August. Rehearsals for the first episode took place on 17 August at the London Transport Assembly Rooms, across the road from the BBC Television Centre. Weekly recording for the serial began on 21 August at the Television Centre, Studio 4. Due to Pinfield's other commitments, the fourth and final episode was directed by Douglas Camfield, who had worked as a production assistant to Waris Hussein during the show's first season. The final episode was recorded on 11 September.

=== Post-production ===
Planet of Giants is the first Doctor Who serial to feature the work of incidental music composer Dudley Simpson, who first recorded on 14 August 1964. On 19 October 1964, head of serials Donald Wilson decided to reduce the four-part serial to three episodes, as it was felt to be an unsatisfactory opening to the show's second season; he preferred to open the season with the following serial, The Dalek Invasion of Earth, but its depiction of Susan's departure prevented the change. The 24-minute third and fourth episodes were transferred to 35 mm film and edited together into a single 25-minute episode from 29 October to 2 November to form a faster-paced climax featuring the main characters. Camfield was credited for the final episode.

== Reception ==
=== Broadcast and ratings ===
| Episode | Title | Run time | Original release date | UK viewers (millions) | Appreciation Index |
|---|---|---|---|---|---|
| 1 | "Planet of Giants" | 23:15 | 31 October 1964 | 8.4 | 57 |
| 2 | "Dangerous Journey" | 23:40 | 7 November 1964 | 8.4 | 58 |
| 3 | "Crisis" | 26:35 | 14 November 1964 | 8.9 | 59 |

Planet of Giants was considered a strong debut to the second season, receiving 8.4 million viewers for the first two episodes and 8.9 million for the third. An Audience Research Report on the first episode indicated that the show had gained 17% of the viewing audience. The Appreciation Index increased slightly over the three episodes, from 57 to 59. The BBC Film and Videotape Library did not select the serial for preservation, and the original tapes were wiped in the late 1960s. In 1977, 16mm film prints of the serial were discovered at BBC Enterprises.

=== Critical response ===
At the BBC Programme Review Board after the broadcast of the first episode in November 1964, the director-general Hugh Greene was unimpressed by the story's concept; following the second episode's broadcast, he noted his disappointment at the serial and eagerness for the Daleks' return. An Audience Research Report on the first episode noted that the response had been positive, with praise directed at the props and special effects.

Retrospective reviews of the serial were mixed. In The Discontinuity Guide (1995), Paul Cornell, Martin Day, and Keith Topping described the serial as "a strange mix of ecological [science fiction] and 'cops and gangsters'", finding it "good fun, if a little unrepresentative of the series". In The Television Companion (1998), David J. Howe and Stephen James Walker found difficulty in understanding why the serial was considered so important by the production team, and found the plot to be "one of the weakest" in the series so far; they praised Hill's performance, and enjoyed Hartnell and Russell, though noted that Ford was "rather less impressive". In 2008, Patrick Mulkern of Radio Times wrote that the story had ambition and impressive set design, but felt that "the drama itself is less than enthralling"; Mulkern noted that Barbara "[came] across as uncharacteristically wet" and described Simpson's score as "annoyingly childish". In 2012, DVD Talk's John Sinnott felt that the serial was a "solid installment", but considered it strange that the main characters do not interact with the criminals. Dave Golder of SFX described the serial as "undeniably slow, talky and lacking in excitement", particularly criticising Barbara's characterisation. Christopher Bahn of The A.V. Club appreciated the ambition of the serial but felt that it "never quite gels together" and the condensed final episodes hindered the overall story.

== Commercial releases ==
Planet of Giants
- Author: Terrance Dicks
- Cover artist: Alister Pearson
- Series: Doctor Who book: Target novelisations
- Release number: 145
- Publisher: Target Books
- Publication date: 18 January 1990
- ISBN: 0-426-20345-3

A novelisation of Planet of Giants, written by Terrance Dicks, was published by Target Books in January 1990. It was the final First Doctor serial to be novelised. Dicks used the original rehearsal script for the first episode and a camera script for the scrapped final episode to restore the missing sequences.

The serial was released on VHS by BBC Video in January 2002; it was the first commercially released story to receive the VidFIRE process. 2 Entertain released the serial on DVD on 20 August 2012, alongside audio commentaries, documentaries, and a recreation of the original third and fourth episodes; the recreation, based on the original scripts, used animation and newly recorded dialogue by Ford and Russell, with John Guilor and Katherine Hadoke as the Doctor and Barbara. The serial was released on Blu-ray on 5 December 2022, alongside the rest of the second season as part of The Collection, and was added to BBC iPlayer on 1 November 2023 alongside most other serials.

== Bibliography ==
- Cornell, Paul; Day, Martin; Topping, Keith (1995). The Discontinuity Guide. London: Virgin Books. ISBN 0-426-20442-5.
- Howe, David J.; Walker, Stephen James; Stammers, Mark (1994). The Handbook: The Unofficial and Unauthorised Guide to the Production of 'Doctor Who'. Vol. 1 (2016 ed.). London: Telos Publishing. ISBN 978-1-845-83941-3.
- Howe, David J.; Walker, Stephen James (1998). Doctor Who: The Television Companion: Volume 1 (2021 ed.). London: BBC Books. ISBN 978-1-845-83156-1.
- Wilson, Mark (2017). Fleiner, Carey; October, Dene (eds.). Doctor Who and History: Critical Essays on Imagining the Past. North Carolina: McFarland & Company. ISBN 978-1-47-666656-3.
- Wright, Mark, ed. (2016). "The Sensorites, The Reign of Terror and Planet of Giants". Doctor Who: The Complete History. 3 (21). London: Panini Comics, Hachette Partworks. ISSN 2057-6048.
