= Fred Ferris (actor) =

British actor (1905–1978)

- Born: Frederick William Ferris; 13 July 1905; West Derby, Liverpool, England
- Died: 25 January 1978 (aged 72); Westminster, London, England
- Occupation(s): actor, stage producer, playwright

Fred Ferris (13 July 1905 – 25 January 1978) was a British actor, stage producer and playwright.

== Biography ==
Ferris was born in West Derby, Liverpool. In the earlier years of his career, he was known as a comic actor, featuring in the BBC Home Service's radio comedy Club Night, which starred Dave Morris and ran between 1950 and 1955.

Ferris was briefly in Coronation Street in 1962. He played Mr Appleby, the father of Colin Appleby.

In later years, Ferris played a large number of police characters, appearing in such shows as Sergeant Cork, Z-Cars, Dixon of Dock Green and The Avengers, as well as in films such as Sky West and Crooked. One of these parts was in the Doctor Who serial Planet of Giants.

Ferris died in 1978, aged 72.

== Filmography ==
Year	Title	Role	Notes
1962	A Kind of Loving	Althorpe	
1962	Some People	Clerk of the Court	
1962	Jigsaw	Information Sergeant	Uncredited
1966	Sky West and Crooked	Police Constable	
