= Dear Dotty =

1954 British TV sitcom

Dear Dotty is a British television sitcom that aired on the BBC in 1954. Starring Avril Angers, Naomi Chance, and Jack Melford, the series consisted of six 30-minute episodes. All six episodes are believed to be lost.

== Cast ==
- Avril Angers as Dotty Binns
- Naomi Chance as Margo Fairfax
- Jack Melford as Mr. Tibbett
- Stephen Hancock as Ian Prendergast
- Robert Dickens as William
- Jack Newmark as Undecided of Fulham/Trouncer
- Cecil Brock as Ian Prendergast
- David Kinsey as William
- Gretchen Franklin as Mrs. Fuller
- Michael Logan as Chairman
- Michael Balfour as Max
- Paul Whitsun-Jones as Butch
- Thomas Gallagher as Timothy Upjohn
- Victor Platt as Waiter
- Frank Atkinson as Club barman
- Cameron Hall as Sir Aubrey Popham
- Geoffrey Sumner as Flight Lieutenant Clanger McGregor
- John Gatrell as Adam Craig
- Edward Cast as Squadron Leader John Dearing
- Mae Bacon as Chloe
