= Nancy Nevinson =

British actress (1918–2012)

- Born: 26 July 1918; Chittagong, Bengal Presidency, British India (modern-day Chattogram, Bangladesh)
- Died: 25 January 2012 (aged 93); Wokingham, Berkshire, England
- Education: RADA
- Occupation: Actress
- Spouse: William Hoyes-Cock (died 1973)
- Children: 3

Nancy Nevinson (born as Nancy Ezekiel, 26 July 1918 – 25 January 2012) was a British actress.

== Early life ==
Nevinson was born in Chittagong, Bengal Presidency, British Raj, as Nancy Ezekiel, one of four children of Reemah (née Kadoorie) and David Ezekiel, members of the Baghdadi-Jewish community of Calcutta during the Raj. The family moved to London in the 1930s, where Nancy trained at RADA and took the stage name Nancy Nevinson, which she retained after her subsequent marriage to Commander William Hoyes-Cock.

== Career ==
Nevison worked on stage, in film and on television. She also dubbed voices for both young and old. She appeared in the films Foxhole in Cairo (1960), Light in the Piazza (1962), Mrs. Gibbons' Boys (1962), Ring of Spies (1964), The Spy Who Came in from the Cold (1965), For the Love of Ada (1972), Symptoms (1974), Jesus of Nazareth (1977), S.O.S. Titanic (1979), Le Pétomane (1979), Raise the Titanic (1980), Young Sherlock Holmes (1985), and Mrs Dalloway (1997).

== Personal life ==
Nevinson married Commander William Hoyes-Cock (1905–1973), whom she met while touring with the Entertainments National Service Association (ENSA) during WW2. They had three children: Nigel Nevinson, Gennie Nevinson, and Hugh Hoyes-Cock. Nigel and Gennie are both actors.

== Retirement ==
In 2001, she moved to Wokingham, to a retirement home funded by the Cinema and Television Benevolent Fund especially for film and television personalities. Nevinson died there on 25 January 2012, aged 93.

== Filmography ==
- 1956: Othello – Emilia (English version, voice)
- 1956: High Flight – Bishop's Wife
- 1957-1959: The Adventures of Twizzle – Twizzle / Narrator (voices)
- 1958: Wonderful Things! – Mother
- 1958: Starr and Company (TV Series) – Megs Turner
- 1960: Night Train for Inverness – Landlady (uncredited)
- 1961: Foxhole in Cairo – Signorina Signorelli
- 1961: Very Important Person – German wife (uncredited)
- 1961: Das Geheimnis der gelben Narzissen – Sluttish woman (uncredited)
- 1962: Light in the Piazza – Signora Naccarelli
- 1962: Mrs. Gibbons' Boys – Mrs. Morelli
- 1963: Ricochet – Elsie Siddall
- 1963: Ring of Spies – Helen Kroger
- 1964: Smuggler's Bay (TV series) – Mrs. Belmore
- 1965: The Big Spender (TV Series) – Mrs. Winters
- 1965: The Spy Who Came In from the Cold – Mrs. Zanfrello (uncredited)
- 1966: The Scales of Justice ('Infamous Conduct' episode)
- 1967: An Officer of the Court (TV Series) – Rachel
- 1970: Love Is a Splendid Illusion – Amanda's Mother
- 1972: Our Miss Fred – Patron's Wife
- 1972: For the Love of Ada – Elsie Lockwood
- 1974: Symptoms – Hannah
- 1977: Jesus of Nazareth (TV Mini-Series) – Abigail
- 1977: Gulliver's Travels – (voice)
- 1979: S.O.S. Titanic (TV Movie) – Ida Strauss
- 1980: Raise the Titanic – Sarah Martindale
- 1981: Private Schulz (TV Series) – Frau Ehrlich
- 1982: Jane (TV Series) – Colonels Wife
- 1985: Young Sherlock Holmes – Hotel Receptionist
- 1988: War and Remembrance (TV Mini-Series) – Woman at Weir Courteney
- 1994: Martin Chuzzlewit (TV Mini-Series) – Deaf Cousin
- 1997: Mrs. Dalloway – Mrs. Hilberry
