= Olga Dickie =

British/Australian actress (1900–1992)

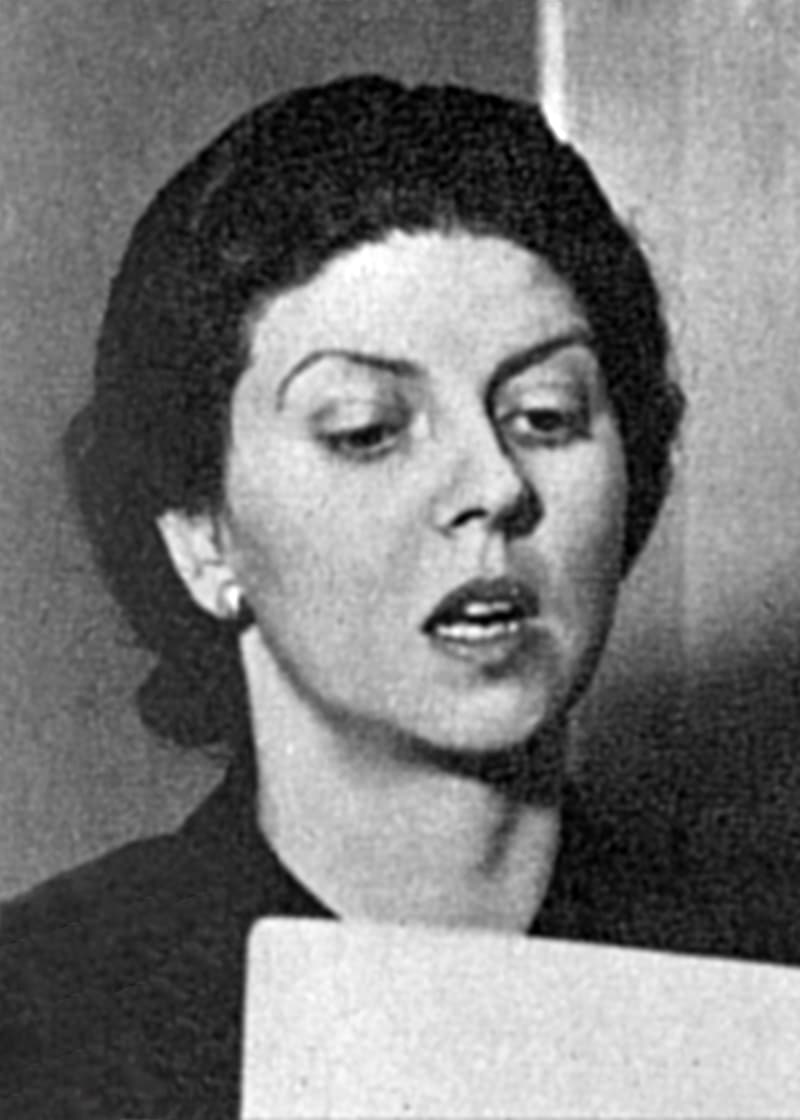
- Dickie at the BBC in 1945
- Born: Olga Helen Fowler Dickie; 28 August 1900; Mariani, Assam, British India (now India)
- Died: 7 March 1992 (aged 91); Sydney, New South Wales, Australia
- Occupations: Actress, radio announcer

Olga Helen Fowler Dickie (28 August 1900 – 7 March 1992) was a British character actress and radio announcer best known for film roles, primarily in the horror and suspense genres

In her later years she worked as a character actress in Australia, notable for roles in film and television.

== Early life ==
Dickie was born to Scottish parents in British India (now India) in 1900.

== Career ==
After living in the UK, and working as a radio announcer, she subsequently appeared in British film productions in cameo type roles from 1949 until 1964 and was best known for her role as Gerda in the English version of Dracula starring Sir Christopher Lee in 1958.

She emigrated to Australia, where in her latter years she had guest roles in TV series and television films from the 1970s onwards, including A Country Practice, Return to Eden and The Flying Doctors, and in film such as Picnic at Hanging Rock and a 1987 adaptation of Neville Shute's The Far County.

== Personal life ==
Dickie was married to British actor Patrick Susands in 1927 and divorced, she married Erik Ernest Swann from 1942 until his death in 1982; she died on 7 March 1992, aged 91, in Sydney, Australia.

== Selected filmography ==
Film
Year	Title	Role	Notes
1958	Dracula	Gerda	
1958	The Spaniard's Curse	Hannah	
1959	Invitation to Murder	Cary Slagg, Andrade's nurse	
1960	Two-Way Stretch	Woman in Pub	Uncredited
1960	Cone of Silence	Miss Wright	Uncredited
1960	The House in Marsh Road	Hotel Proprietress	Uncredited
1962	The Boys	Mrs. Coulter	Uncredited
1962	Kiss of the Vampire	Woman at Graveyard	Uncredited
1964	The Curse of the Mummy's Tomb	Housekeeper	Uncredited
1975	Picnic at Hanging Rock	Mrs. Fitzhubert	
Television
Year	Title	Role	Notes
1952	The Three Hostages	Madame Breda	4 episodes
1990	The Flying Doctors	Mrs. Lightburn	1 episode, (final appearance)
