= Allan Prior =

English TV scriptwriter and novelist (1922–2006)

- Born: 13 January 1922; Newcastle upon Tyne, Northumberland, England, UK
- Died: 1 June 2006 (aged 84); St. Albans, Hertfordshire, England, UK

Allan Prior (13 January 1922, Newcastle upon Tyne, Northumberland, – 1 June 2006) was an English television scriptwriter and novelist, who wrote over 300 television episodes from the 1950s onwards.

He was founder-writer of influential police drama Z-Cars with Troy Kennedy Martin and wrote five of the first ten episodes and a total of 136 episodes for Z-Cars and spin-off series Softly, Softly. He also wrote several episodes of the 1970s science-fiction series Blake's 7. Along with producer Gerard Glaister he co-created the BBC drama series Howards' Way in 1985.

He wrote more than thirty original plays for television, from episodes of Armchair Theatre to later works including The Charmer (1987) and A Perfect Hero (1991). In 1995 his radio play Führer was BBC Radio 4's flagship drama for its End of the War in Europe anniversary programmes.

His daughter is the Steeleye Span singer Maddy Prior.

== Awards ==
- 1962 and 1964 Crime Writers' Association Award,
- 1962 and 1965 Writers Guild of Great Britain Award
- 1963 Grand Prix de Littérature Policière
- 1974 BAFTA Award

== Novels ==
- A Flame in the Air (1951)
- The Joy Ride (1952)
- The One-eyed Monster (1958)
- Z Cars Again (1963)
- The Interrogators (1965)
- The Operators (1966)
- The Loving Cup (1968)
- The Charmer (1970)
- The Contract (1970)
- Theatre (1970)
- Paradiso (1972)
- Affair (1976)
- Never Been Kissed in the Same Place Twice (1978)
- The Big March (1983)
- A Cast of Stars (1983)
- Her Majesty's Hit Man (1986)
- Fuhrer (1991)
- The Old Man and Me (1994)
- One Away (2013)

== Non-fiction ==
- Script to Screen (1996)
