= Guy Kingsley Poynter =

American actor (1915–1983)

Guy Poynter
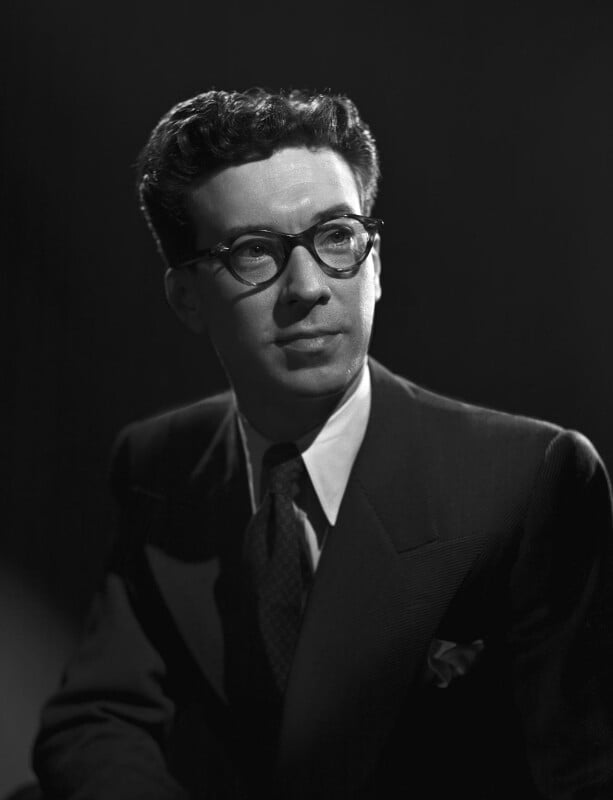
- Poynter in 1947
- Born: Guy Kingsley Poynter; 3 September 1915; Great Neck, Nassau County, New York, United States of America
- Died: 6 September 1983 (aged 68); London, England, UK
- Occupation: Actor
- Years active: 1940–1983

Guy Kingsley Poynter, also known as Guy Kingsley (3 September 1915 – 6 September 1983), was an American actor.

Poynter played 'Doctor Daniel "Doc" Matthews' in the 1950s radio series Journey into Space. He appeared in the TV drama Armchair Theatre in 1959; as the narrator for Harrison Marks' Naked as Nature Intended in 1961; and played twice in ITV's "Play Of The Week", in 1963. He made many other appearances in various-sized parts, often playing against well-known stars of the period.

== Personal life ==
He married Margaret E. Fraser in 1947.

He died in London in 1983.

== Filmography ==
- Too Much Johnson (1938) – Henry MacIntosh
- Cage of Gold (1950) – American soldier (uncredited)
- The Good Die Young (1954) – US serviceman at train station (uncredited)
- The Crooked Sky (1957) – Tom Alanson
- Floods of Fear (1958) – Deputy Sheriff
- Beyond the Curtain (1960) – Capt. Law
- Peeping Tom (1960) – P. Tate – Studio cameraman (uncredited)
- Naked as Nature Intended (1961) – Narrator
- Have Bikini Will Travel (1962) – Narrator
- Heavens Above! (1963) – American commentator (uncredited)
- The Girl Hunters (1963) – Dr Larry Snyder

== TV work ==
Date	Title	Role	Refs
17 August 1947	Double Door	Rip Van Bret	
14 March 1948	I Killed the Count	Bernard K. Froy	
27 December 1949	The Long Christmas Dinner	Roderick	
23 August 1954	The Runaway Slave	Mr. Allenby	
19 November 1954	War in the Air: 3: Fifty North	other voices	
6 October 1954	War in the Air: 5: Desert Air Force	other voices	
20 December 1954	War in the Air: 7: The Rising Sun	Narration	
27 December 1954	War in the Air: 8: Round the Clock	other voices	
27 December 1954	War in the Air: 12: The Cold Dawn	Commentary	
31 January 1955	War in the Air: 13: Eastern Victory	Commentary	
24 May 1955	The Golden Future	Mr. Henry Morton Stanley	
3 May 1956	The Male Animal	Michael Barnes	
15 June 1956	The Innocent Gunman	Samuel Clemens	
12 December 1956	The Adventures of Pierre...Zero Hour	Lawyer	
4 August 1957	Henry Sherek presents...Teru	Harold Clark	
4 October 1957	The Long Christmas Dinner	Roderick	
1 December 1958	Starr and Company: Patent Bluff	McColl	
4 December 1958	Starr and Company: To Catch a Mackerel	McColl	
