= Roy Limbert =

Roy Limbert (1893–1954) was a prominent London West End theatre director and producer between the 1930s and the 1950s.

== Biography ==
The son of Charles Limbert and Florence Strahan Campbell, Roy Limbert was born in 1893 and educated at Bedford School.

In 1929, Limbert established the Malvern Festival, at the Festival Theatre, Malvern, with Sir Barry Jackson. He was joint director of the festival with Jackson until 1938, when he assumed sole control. Between 1929 and 1949, the Malvern Festival was primarily a festival of the work of George Bernard Shaw, producing twenty-two of his plays, six of them for the first time in England, one a world premiere.

Between 1932 and 1952, Limbert directed and produced a large number of highly successful London West End theatre productions.

Roy Limbert died on 29 November 1954.

== London West End stage productions directed and produced by Roy Limbert ==
- The School for Husbands, Royal Court Theatre, 1932
- She Shall Have Music, Saville Theatre, 1934
- Barnet’s Folly, Haymarket Theatre, 1935
- The Last Trump, Duke of York's Theatre, 1938
- Geneva, Saville Theatre, 1938, and St James's Theatre, 1939
- Worth a Million, Saville Theatre, 1939
- Music at Night, Westminster Theatre, 1939
- In Good King Charles’s Golden Days, New Theatre, 1940
- Rookery Nook, St Martin's Theatre, 1942
- Mr Bolfry, Westminster Theatre, and subsequently Playhouse Theatre, 1943
- It Depends What You Mean, Westminster Theatre, 1944
- The Forrigan Reel, Sadler's Wells Theatre, 1945
- Dr Angelus, Phœnix Theatre, 1946
- School for Spinsters, Criterion Theatre, 1947
- The Anatomist, Westminster Theatre, 1948
- Miss Mabel, Duchess Theatre, subsequently Royal Strand Theatre, 1948
- Two Dozen Red Roses, Lyric Theatre, 1949
- Lady Audley’s Secret, Princes Theatre, 1949
- Buoyant Billions, Princes Theatre, 1949
- Black Chiffon, Westminster Theatre, 1949, 1950
- Background, Westminster Theatre, 1950
- Journey’s End, Westminster Theatre, 1950
- Lace on Her Petticoat, Ambassadors Theatre, 1950
- Beauty And The Beast, Westminster Theatre, 1950
- The Martins’ Nest, Westminster Theatre, 1951
- Taking Things Quietly, Ambassadors Theatre, 1951
- Winter Sport, on tour, 1951
- The Day’s Mischief, Duke of York's Theatre, 1951–52
