= Nick of the River =

1959 British crime television series

- Genre: Police procedural
- Directed by: Bill Hitchcock
- Starring: George Baker; Martin Wyldeck; Lane Meddick
- Country of origin: United Kingdom
- Original language: English
- No. of series: 1
- No. of episodes: 9

Production
- Running time: 30 minutes
- Production company: Associated-Rediffusion Television

Original release
- Network: ITV
- Release: 13 July – 7 September 1959

Nick of the River is a British crime television series that first aired on ITV in 1959. A police procedural, it starred George Baker as Detective Inspector D.H.C. 'Nick' Nixon. The main cast also included Martin Wyldeck and Lane Meddick.

Other actors who appeared in the show include Vera Day, Ronald Fraser, David Lodge, Frederick Piper, Sidney Vivian, Michael Nightingale, George Woodbridge, Campbell Singer, Vanda Godsell and Philip Leaver.

A review in The Spectator suggested that the show and other recent ITV programmes Cannonball and Overseas Press Club - Exclusive! were "notable only for lack of interest and inspiration".

== Bibliography ==
- The Spectator, Volume 203. F.C. Westley, 1959
