= The Three Hostages (TV series) =

1952 British TV drama series

- Genre: Historical thriller
- Based on: The Three Hostages by John Buchan
- Directed by: Julian Amyes
- Starring: Patrick Barr; Peter Rendall; Jill Melford
- No. of episodes: 6 (all missing)

Production
- Producer: Ian Atkins

Original release
- Network: BBC
- Release: 1952 – 1952

The Three Hostages is a British television series which aired on the BBC in 1952. It was an adaptation of the 1924 novel The Three Hostages by John Buchan featuring his character Richard Hannay who is played by Patrick Barr. It consisted of six 30 minutes episodes. The BBC adapted the story again in 1977 as a film The Three Hostages with Barry Foster as Hannay. Broadcast live before telerecording was utilised in the UK, the series is missing, believed lost.

== Main cast ==
- Patrick Barr ... Sir Richard Hannay (6 episodes)
- Peter Rendall ... Lord Mercot (6 episodes)
- Jill Melford ... Adela Victor (6 episodes)
- Robert Scroggins ... David Warcliff (6 episodes)
- Carla Lehmann ... Lady Mary Hannay (5 episodes)
- Stuart Douglass ... Sgt Flemyng (5 episodes)
- Alan Gordon ... The Thin Grey Man (5 episodes)
- John Byron ... Dominick Medina (5 episodes)
- John Laurie ... Inspector MacGillivray (4 episodes)
- Raymond Young ... Marquis de la Tour du Pin (4 episodes)
- Michael Gwynn ... Sandy Arbuthnot (4 episodes, 1952)
- Danny Green ... Odell (4 episodes)
- Olga Dickie ... Madame Breda (4 episodes)
- Maurice Bannister ... Julian / ... (3 episodes)
- Pamela Barnard ... Elsie Outhwaite / ... (3 episodes)
- Arthur Lawrence ... Archie Roylance (3 episodes)
