= Stella Richman =

British television producer (1922–2002)

- Born: 9 November 1922
- Died: 24 May 2002 (aged 79)
- Occupation: British actress turned script editor/television producer/programming director
- Spouse(s): Alec Clunes; Victor Brusa; Alec Hyams
- Children: 2

Stella Richman (9 November 1922 – 24 May 2002) was a British actress turned television executive.

== Biography ==
Originally an actress—she had a bit part in the second episode of The Quatermass Experiment in 1953—Richman was appointed as a script editor of single plays at ATV by Lew Grade in 1960. Grade's sole condition was that her commissions did not gain disastrous ratings. According to Frederic Raphael, "Richman proved, by her demanding eclecticism, that quality was not the enemy of popularity. Since there could (and can) be no rules for what the public liked, she assumed that, if she gave them the best work she could find, they would like that." In particular, she was responsible for overseeing the Love Story anthology series in its early years.

Moving to Associated Rediffusion around 1964, she became their Head of Series, and created a genre which critic Philip Purser termed 'Our Story'. At the new London Weekend Television, she oversaw a six-part series of television plays, The Company of Five (1968), which featured a central group of five actors. The series featured works by Leon Griffiths, Roy Minton, Alun Owen, Dennis Potter (Shaggy Dog), and C. P. Taylor.

In 1970, as Director of Programming at LWT, she was the first woman to be appointed to the board of an ITV contractor. A longstanding acquaintance of actress Jean Marsh, she commissioned the series Upstairs, Downstairs which Marsh had co-created. Richman's period at LWT was short-lived. Reportedly sacked by Rupert Murdoch, then in effective control of the company, she went independent, renewing an association with David Frost, and was responsible for projects such as Jennie: Lady Randolph Churchill (1974) starring Lee Remick. For Thames Television, she oversaw Trevor Griffiths' serial Bill Brand (1976), and for ATV, Clayhanger (1976), a 26-part dramatisation of Arnold Bennett's novel cycle The Clayhanger Family.

== Personal life ==
Stella Richman married three times; her first husband was actor Alec Clunes. With her second husband, Victor Brusa, the father of her two children, she established the White Elephant Club, a restaurant and drinking club of which she was chairwoman from 1960 to 1968. She married, thirdly, to Alec Hyams. Her marriages to Clunes and Hyams ended in divorce. Victor Brusa died in 1965.

== Death ==
She died in 2002, aged 79, and was survived by her two children (Paul Brusa and Cookie Vance), as well as her son-in-law, Tommy Vance, and two grandchildren.
