= Impact (1963 film) =

1963 British film by Peter Maxwell

- Quad poster
- Directed by: Peter Maxwell
- Written by: Peter Maxwell; Conrad Phillips
- Produced by: John I. Phillips; Ronald Liles
- Starring: Conrad Phillips; George Pastell
- Cinematography: Gerald Moss
- Edited by: David Hawkins
- Music by: Johnny Gregory
- Production company: Butcher's Film Service
- Distributed by: Butcher's Film Service
- Release date: 1963
- Running time: 61 minutes
- Country: United Kingdom
- Language: English

Impact is a 1963 British crime thriller directed by Peter Maxwell and starring Conrad Phillips and George Pastell. It was written by Maxwell and Phillips, and produced by John I. Phillips and Ronald Liles for Butcher's Film Service.

== Plot ==
Seeking vengeance for newspaper articles written about him, crooked Soho nightclub owner "The Duke" kidnaps crime reporter Jack Moir and frames him for theft. While serving a two-year prison sentence Moir plots his revenge and, upon release, embarks on a scheme to clear his name.

== Cast ==
- Conrad Phillips as Jack Moir
- George Pastell as Sebastian "The Duke" Dukelow
- Ballard Berkeley as Bill MacKenzie
- Linda Marlowe as Diana Travers
- Richard Klee as Wally Wheeler
- Anita West as Melanie Calf
- John Rees as Charlie Wright
- Frank Pettitt as Sid the foreman
- Edward Ogden as Maury Parfitt
- Jean Trend as Hilda, the secretary
- Desmond Cullum-Jones as prison warder
- Mike Pratt as Detective Sergeant
- Don Barkham as constable
- Cecil Waters as Jules

== Critical reception ==
The Monthly Film Bulletin wrote: "A modest but adequately staged thriller, with a script which is neat enough, and keeps one nicely guessing for a time whether Charlie has turned traitor or not. If it all seems rather flat, it is probably due to the acting. George Pastell's villain, and Anita West's night-club-singer-moll, are persuasive in an orthodox way, but the rest of the cast is variable, with one or two performances which would scarcely do credit to a hard-pressed repertory company. And many a schoolboy will pounce on errors in railway detail."

Kine Weekly wrote: "The picture, which presents a rugged permutation of the tit-for-tat theme, seldom lets up and the hero's battle against the villain is at once plausible and exciting. Conrad Phillips plays it cool as the determined Jack, George Pastell makes a thoroughly menacing 'Duke,' John Rees is a card as Charlie, and Linda Marlowe pleases as the loyal Diana. There are a few gay night club sequences, complete with songs, but it's the malarky in the deep freeze that gives the tabloid bite."

The Radio Times Guide to Films gave the film 2/5 stars, writing: "Co-written by star Conrad Phillips and director Peter Maxwell, this was produced in a matter of days on a shoestring budget and contains no surprises as ace reporter Phillips is set up as a train robber by vengeful club boss George Pastell. Maxwell just about keeps what action there is ticking over, but he is fighting a losing battle with a cast that is substandard, even for a B-movie."
