= Philip Ray =

British actor (1898–1978)

- in Interpol Calling (1959) Ep: The Angola Brights
- Born: Roy Edgar Cochrane; 1 November 1898; Streatham, London, England
- Died: 11 May 1978 (aged 79); Kingston upon Thames, London, England
- Occupations: Stage actor Film actor Television actor
- Years active: 1929–1973

Philip Ray (born Roy Edgar Cochrane, 1 November 1898 – 11 May 1978) was a British stage, film and television actor. Occasionally credited as Phil Ray, he played numerous and varied supporting roles, particularly in films and on television. He also saw military service in both WWI and WWII.

== Selected filmography ==
- Old Roses (1935) - Minor Role (uncredited)
- Blue Smoke (1935) - Jan
- Sexton Blake and the Bearded Doctor (1935) - Jim Cameron
- Twelve Good Men (1936) - Higgs
- Find the Lady (1936) - (uncredited)
- Not So Dusty (1936) - Dan Stevens
- Head Office (1936) - Gerrard
- Dark Journey (1937) - Faber
- Perfect Crime (1937) - Newbold
- Farewell Again (1937) - Moore
- The Man Who Made Diamonds (1937) - Tompkins
- Second Best Bed (1938) - Stanley Hurley
- Mr. Reeder in Room 13 (1938) - Fenner
- Double or Quits (1938) - Hepworth
- It's in the Air (1938) - Airman with Shoe (uncredited)
- The Nursemaid Who Disappeared (1939)
- Dangerous Fingers (1939) - Ben
- Jamaica Inn (1939) - Undetermined Role (uncredited)
- The Door with Seven Locks (1940) - Tom Cawler
- Send for Paul Temple (1946) - Horace Daley
- The October Man (1947) - Stebbins
- Fame Is the Spur (1947) - Doctor (uncredited)
- Miranda (1948) - Fisherman (uncredited)
- The Winslow Boy (1948) - First Speaking Member (uncredited)
- Adam and Evalyn (1949) - Gambler (uncredited)
- No Place for Jennifer (1950) - Mr. Marshall
- Night and the City (1950) - Man (uncredited)
- The Adventurers (1951) - Man in Restaurant
- No Highway in the Sky (1951) - Burroughs (uncredited)
- Emergency Call (1952) - Captain Wilcox
- Derby Day (1952) - 2nd Newspaper Reporter (uncredited)
- The Net (1953) - Sentry (uncredited)
- The Story of Gilbert and Sullivan (1953) - Theatre manager
- The Fake (1953) - Bearded Tramp
- Gilbert Harding Speaking of Murder (1953) - Theatre manager
- Trouble in Store (1953) - Girls' Hostel Caretaker (uncredited)
- Hell Below Zero (1954) - Capt. Petersen
- The Good Die Young (1954) - Promoter (uncredited)
- Before I Wake (1955) - Station master (U.S. title: Shadow of Fear)
- Where There's a Will (1955) - Squire Stokes
- Passage Home (1955) - River pilot
- The Extra Day (1956) - John Bliss
- No Road Back (1957) - Garage man
- The Secret Place (1957) - Mr. Venner (uncredited)
- Count Five and Die (1957)
- Dunkirk (1958) - Extra (uncredited)
- A Night to Remember (1958) - Reverend Anderson
- Sapphire (1959) - Mr. Young (uncredited)
- Date at Midnight (1959) - Jenkins
- Sons and Lovers (1960) - Dr. Ansell
- No Love for Johnnie (1961) - M.P - House of Commons Entrance Area (uncredited)
- Backfire! (1962) - Coroner
- In the Doghouse (1962) - Vicar (uncredited)
- Panic (1963) - Jessop
- The Mind Benders (1963) - Father (uncredited)
- Devil Doll (1964) - Uncle Walter (uncredited)
- Dracula: Prince of Darkness (1966) - Priest
- Frankenstein Created Woman (1967) - Mayor
- Doctor Who: The Seeds of Death (1969) - Daniel Eldred
