= John Forbes-Robertson (actor) =

English actor (1928–2008)

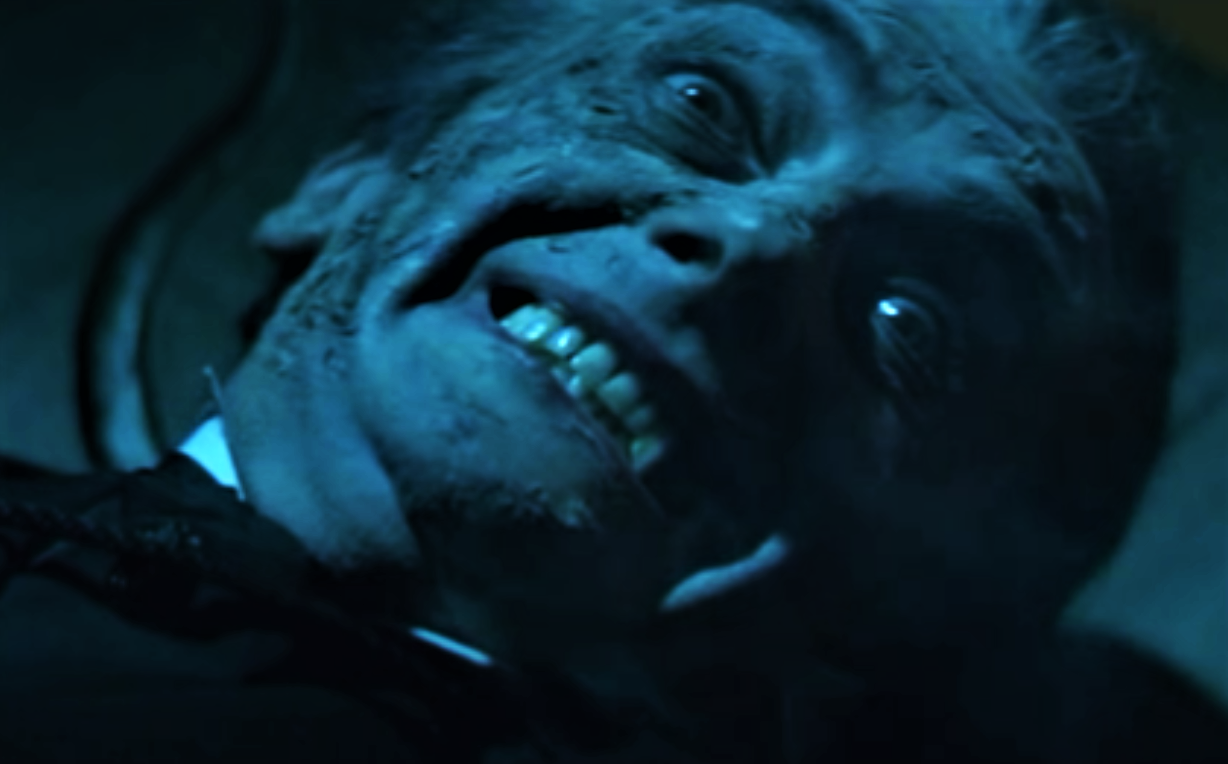
Forbes-Robertson in The Legend of the 7 Golden Vampires

John Forbes-Robertson (10 May 1928 – 14 May 2008) was a British actor best known for being the only actor other than Christopher Lee to play Count Dracula for Hammer Film Productions.

== Early life ==
He was born in Worthing, Sussex. He was not the son of actor-manager Sir Johnston Forbes-Robertson, as erroneously stated in the press at the time of his death; he was the grandson of one of Sir Johnston's brothers.

== Career ==
He began his acting career on the stage, starting at the Intimate Theatre in Palmers Green, before pursuing a film and TV career in the 1950s and 1960s, usually in minor roles, in films such as The Battle of the River Plate (1956), Bunny Lake Is Missing (1965) and The Spy with a Cold Nose (1966). He made two films for Hammer - The Vampire Lovers (1970), as the Man in Black, and The Legend of the 7 Golden Vampires (1974), as Dracula. Other film credits include Nicholas and Alexandra (1971), The Vault of Horror (1973), Venom (1981) and Lifeforce (1985). On TV he appeared in a 1975 episode of Thriller ("The Next Voice You See") and played Leonard Rossiter's love rival, Henry Possett, in The Fall and Rise of Reginald Perrin (1976).

His last appearance on screen was in a documentary, The Legend of Hammer: Vampires (2008), directed by Don Fearney.

== Death ==
Forbes-Robertson died on 14 May 2008.

== Filmography ==
Year	Title	Role	Notes
1937	Kathleen Mavourneen	Pat O'Moore	
1952	Salute the Toff	Gerald Harvey	Uncredited
1956	The Baby and the Battleship	Gunnery Officer	Uncredited
1956	The Battle of the River Plate	Lt. McBarnett - HMS Exeter	Uncredited
1963	Girl in the Headlines	Porter	
1963	The Partner	Alwood	
1964	First Men in the Moon	First Reporter	Uncredited
1965	Bunny Lake Is Missing	Hospital Attendant	
1966	The Fighting Prince of Donegal		
1966	The Spy with a Cold Nose	M.I.5 Workshop Director	
1970	Cromwell	Colonel Harrison	Uncredited
1970	The Vampire Lovers	Man in Black	
1971	Nicholas and Alexandra	Col. Voikov	
1973	The Vault of Horror	Wilson	(segment "The Neat Job")
1974	The Legend of the 7 Golden Vampires	Dracula	
1975	The Man from Nowhere	Mr Freeman	
1981	Venom	Sgt. Nash	
1982	The Island of Adventure	Mr. Roy	
1985	Lifeforce	The Minister	
2005	Room 36	Norman	
