= Emilia Marryat =

English children's writer (1835–1875)

Emilia Marryat (October 1835 – 20 April 1875) was an English writer of children's books. The third daughter of the author Captain Frederick Marryat and his wife, Catherine, she followed her father's example by infusing her adventure novels with moral lessons. Occasionally, she published under her married name, Emilia Marryat Norris.

== Biography ==
Marryat was born in Devonport, Plymouth, England. Some of her novels, including Amongst the Maoris (1874), are set in the Pacific and New Zealand. Amongst the Maoris was the first novel to take the Waikato region of New Zealand's North Island as a setting. Though two of her novels have Australian content, she is not known to have visited there.

Marryat was the daughter of the Royal Naval officer and author Frederick Marryat and his wife, Catherine. In the 1851 England Census, the Marryat family is listed at 4 Cambridge Villas, Richmond, Surrey. Captain Marryat was renowned for his nautical novels, which include Mr Midshipman Easy (1836), and their father's example as a popular novelist inspired Emilia and two of her sisters to write their own novels in adulthood. Augusta wrote adventure fiction, such as the novel Left to Themselves: A Boy's Adventure in Australia (1878). Florence was a prolific author of sensationalist novels, who also acquired a reputation for consorting with spiritual mediums. She gained further public interest with her late Victorian novel The Blood of the Vampire (1897).

=== Marriage ===
On 23 May 1862, Emilia Marryat married Henry Edmonds Norris at St Thomas Church, Winchester, Hampshire, England. With Henry, she had three children in rapid succession, Frank Marryat Norris (born 1864), Hensleigh (born 1865), and Helen Emilia. Born in 1866, Helen was baptized on 14 April of that year at Charmouth, Dorset, where the Norrises resided at the time of the 1871 England Census; living in the same home in Charmouth were the family's governess, Sarah L. Woods. and two servants. No doubt inspired by his grandfather's legacy, Frank achieved at the age of 24 the rank of second mate in the British Navy in Charmouth, Dorset. He later emigrated to Australia, where he married Frances Katherine Shaw in Sydney, New South Wales, on 10 November 1890. He died in Hutt, Wellington, New Zealand in 1945. At the age of 26, his sister Helen married Francis William Jenkins on 11 June 1892 in Spaxton, Somerset.

=== Death ===
Emilia was unable to see her children's successes in adulthood. She died in Charmouth, Dorset, England in 1875, aged 44 and was buried 24 April 1875. In the Preface to her sister's last work expressly intended for publication during her lifetime, Paul Howard's Captivity and Why He Escaped (1876), Augusta included the following note, "Since these pages were written, but before they could go to press, the kind hand that penned them – the active brain of one who loved and sought to benefit by tender truths all little children – lay at rest. Emilia Marryat Norris died suddenly on the 20th of last April; and all of you boys and girls who read this her last work – you in whose joys and sorrows she so greatly sympathized – must receive it now as you would a legacy from one who loved you."

== Works ==
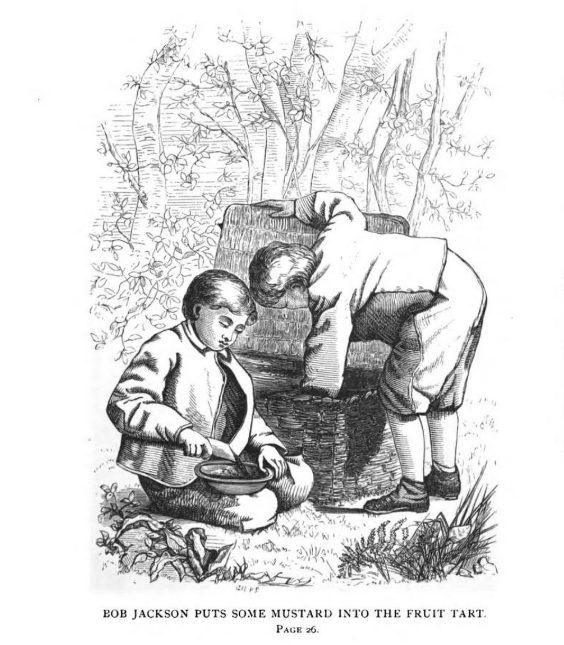
Illustration by Augusta Marryat from The Children's Pic-Nic and What Came of It (1868)

Though Emilia Marryat Norris is known now for writing novels intended for children, her first two were for adults.

Her forward to Temper (1854), which advertised her as her father's daughter, stated, "A short time before my father died, he desired me to attempt writing. I have followed his wishes; and you have the attempt"(Preface). Set in Norfolk, the story begins with the ungovernable temper of a child named Lawrence.

While in the nursery, to the horror of his mother, Lady Flora Arden, he flings a knife at a servant maid, resulting in her leg being amputated. In the course of the novel, his temper is seen to be the result of his parents' laughter at his expense in the nursery and encouragement of his childish anger for amusement, as well as emulating their own outbursts of anger. As an adult, Lawrence accidentally murders his sister's fiancé with a gun in a moment of passion, creating chaos for his family.

It was followed by Henry Lyle; or, Life and Existence (1856), a story of a beneficent young man, Henry Lyle, attempting to help several people in his community find self-worth and useful employment; most notably, he helps a young teenager, Willy Benson, overcome his learning difficulties through education, and find a place in society despite his disability.

She also wrote Every-day (1861) as a guide to proper child-raising, warning parents against mistreating any one of their children or showing favoritism, which leads to bad effects later in life. Emilia states, "Time softens all things: but speak in grown age to one who has passed through a neglected and an unjust childhood, and you will find that the more tangible sorrows of later years have not made so deep an impression as the remembrance of those first half-intelligible griefs."

All subsequent books were tales of children experiencing life at a young age, or conduct books of advice on how children should behave, beginning with Long Evenings, or, Stories for My Little Friends (1861). The Early Start in Life (1867) promotes the values of godliness, hard work, self-discipline, and the chances offered by the New World. In what appears to have been her only artistic collaboration with a family member, The Children's Pic-Nic and What Came of It (1868) was illustrated by her sister Augusta. It was followed by several other works such as What Became of Tommy (1866), and Alda Graham, and her brother Philip (1872).

Emilia used pictures by various illustrators to keep her audience engaged, while simultaneously giving them stories to which they could relate.

== Selected works ==
A full bibliography appears in The Cambridge Bibliography of English Literature: 1800–1900, Vol. 4.

=== Novels for adults ===
- Temper (1854)
- Henry Lyle; or, Life and Existence (1856)
- Every-day (1861)

=== Books for children ===
- Long Evenings, or, Stories for My Little Friends (1861)
- Harry at School: A Story for Boys (1862)
- A Week by Themselves (1865)
- What Became of Tommy (1866)
- The Early Start in Life (1867)
- The Children's Pic-Nic and What Came of it (1868)
- The Stolen Cherries, or Tell the Truth at Once (1869)
- Geoffrey's Great Fault (1870)
- Adrift on the Sea; or, the Children's Escape (1870)
- Alda Graham, and her brother Philip (1872)
- Snowed Up; or, the Hut in the Forest (1873)
- Amongst the Maoris (1874)
- The Sea-Side Home and the Smugglers' Cave (1875)
- Paul Howard's Captivity and Why He Escaped (1876)
