= Paddle Your Own Canoe =

Paddle Your Own Canoe is a phrase that implies independence from others. The first known use is in the 1844 book The Settlers in Canada.

It may also refer to:

- Paddle Your Own Canoe, an 1850 poem by Sarah T. Bolton
- Paddle Your Own Canoe: An Illustrated Guide to the Art of Canoeing, a 1999 book by Gary and Joanie McGuffin
- Paddle Your Own Canoe, a 2013 book by Nick Offerman
- The theme of Rovering to Success, a 1922 life-guide book
