= Percival Keene =

1842 book by Frederick Marryat

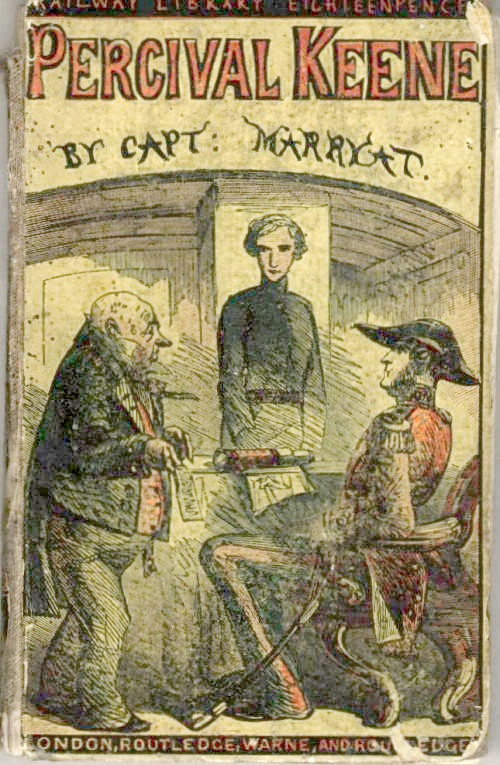
- Cover of the 1860 edition
- Author: Frederick Marryat
- Language: English
- Publication date: 1842
- Publication place: United Kingdom

Percival Keene is a coming-of-age adventure novel published in three volumes in 1842 by Frederick Marryat. The book follows the nautical adventures of the title character, a low-born illegitimate child of a captain in the Royal Navy, as he enters service as a midshipman during the Napoleonic Wars and rises through the ranks with the help of his influential father.

== Plot ==
At Madeline Hall, an old mansion-house near Southampton belonging to the wealthy de Versely family, lives an elderly spinster Miss Delmar, the aunt of the earl de Versely and Captain Delmar. Miss Delmar invites Arabella Mason, the daughter of a deceased, well-liked steward to stay with her as a lower-class guest in the house. Captain Delmar is known to visit his aunt at Madeline Hall frequently, accompanied by his valet Ben Keene, who is also a private marine. Captain Delmar eventually suggests that Ben should propose to Arabella, and the two marry in secret, to the frustration of Miss Delmar and Arabella's mother. The captain is able to smooth over the situation with his aunt, even after it is discovered that Arabella was six months pregnant at the time of the marriage. She later gives birth to a boy, who takes the Captain's Christian name and Ben's surname—the titular Percival Keene.

The family moves to Chatham, after Ben is ordered back with his detachment. Arabella opens up a successful shop and circulating library below her house, enlisting the help of her mother and sister, Amelia. Percival becomes well known in town from his mischievous pranks on officers and other strangers, often encouraged by his aunt Amelia. However, Percival's mother and grandmother are less fond of his disregard for manners, and insist on sending him to school after an episode in which he bites his grandmother. Percival reports to the school house of Mr. O'Gallagher, a poor Irish scholar, who rules his class with a system of severe corporal punishment. Mr. O'Gallagher routinely bullies Percival by stealing his lunch, leading Percival to seek revenge by poisoning his sandwiches with calomel. On Guy Fawkes Day the schoolteacher confiscates all the schoolboys' fireworks, for which Percival retaliates by setting off the collected fireworks while the teacher sits above them, leading to the total destruction of the schoolhouse and near death of the schoolmaster.

When Percival is a young teenager, Captain Delmar reappears and offers him a position aboard his new navy ship, the H.M. Calliope. While preparing to enter service, Percival overhears gossip of his illegitimate birth, introducing the idea that Captain Delmar may be his father. He confronts his mother about his parentage, which she at first harshly denies but later tearfully explains the truth of her affair. Early in his service in the navy, Percival is captured during a pirate raid along with others. The pirate crew is entirely black, and the captain explains that they are primarily escaped slaves from the Americas. Percival is taken in as a cabin boy, and later dyes his skin tan in the appearance of a mulatto to please the captain who doesn't approve of white skin. The pirates often seek to take over slave trading vessels, killing every white person on board. During the taking of one such vessel, Percival is able is convince the captain to spare the lives of a wealthy Dutch merchant and his young daughter, Minnie. Eventually the H.M. Calliope takes the pirate ship, and Percival—unrecognizable with his dyed skin—is taken as a prisoner, later to convince his fellow shipman of his true identity.

After his reappearance aboard the ship, Percival gains esteem among the crew and is welcomed back by the emotional Captain Delmar. His reputation continues to grow over the course of his service in conflicts with Dutch and French vessels around the island of Curacao. He also stands in for an ill Captain Delmar in a duel with a French officer, effectively saving the captain's life. At this point, the captain receives news that his older brother has died, making him the new Lord de Versely, and before returning to England he grants Perceval command of his own schooner. After another intense but successful battle with a French war ship, Percival is promoted to captain. During his service in the Navy, Percival still partakes in the merry pranks of his youth, and at one point teams up with a mulatto hotel owner in Curaçao to convince his fellow officers they've been poisoned. He also keeps correspondence with Minnie, developing a romance with the beautiful heiress.

Near the end of the story, Percival guides his crew through a terrible storm in which many of the crew are killed and the ship is heavily damaged. After being saved by another English vessel, he receives a letter informing him of Lord de Versely's sudden death from heart complications and learns that he has been left all of his personal property. Percival is still disappointed that he can not take his father's name. He later journey's with his friend Bob Cross to Hamburg to reunite with Minnie, but is captured by French troops on the road and sentenced to execution for spying. During a skirmish between the French and the Cossacks, Percival and Cross are able to escape and continue on the road. At the end of the novel, Percival proposes to Minnie, and stands to inherit a great fortune through her father. He also receives a letter from the de Versely attorney letting him know he has been granted the arms and name of Delmar.

== Characters ==
=== Major characters ===
- Percival Keene: The protagonist and narrator, Percival is the illegitimate son of Captain Delmar. After being raised by his mother and Ben Keene, he joins the Royal Navy as a midshipman aboard Captain Delmar's, the H.M. Calliope. He frequently pulls clever pranks on those around him both during his childhood and in his naval career.
- Captain Delmar: A captain in the Royal Navy and the father of Percival Keene. Delmar avoids recognizing Percival as his offspring early on, overseeing the boy's career with a detached admiration. Eventually Delmar becomes the heir to the de Versely name and fortune after his brother's death, and after his own death at the end of the novel, names Percival as his heir.
- Bob Cross: The coxswain aboard the H.M. Calliope, Bob Cross is Percival's closest friend and confidant during his naval career. He accompanies Percival on his trip to Hamburg, where they are captured and nearly executed by French forces.

=== Minor characters ===
- Tommy Dott: Another midshipman on the H.M. Calliope, Tommy Dott frequently conspires with Percival on pranks of other crew members. He is badly wounded during a raid from a French ship.
- Minnie Vanderwilt: Percival Keene's love interest, she first enters the narrative after she and her father are captured by the black pirates who hold Percival hostage. Percival is able to convince Vincent, the pirate captain, to let the Vanderwilts go unharmed. Minnie's father is a wealthy Dutch merchant. By the end of the novel, Percival proposes to Minnie and will inherit her father's wealth when he marries her.
- Mr. O'Gallagher: An Irish schoolmaster who severely beats Percival when he is a child. Percival retaliates against Mr. O'Gallagher through elaborate pranks which ultimately result in the destruction of the schoolhouse and near-death of the schoolmaster.
- Vincent: The captain of the all-black pirate crew that takes Percival hostage. He explains his background to Percival, which involves being a runaway slave from the United States. He begins to like Percival after the boy dies his skin a darker color.
- Crissobella: A female, mulatto hotel owner in Curacao who works with Percival to trick other rowdy tenants of the hotel into thinking that they've been poisoned.

== Genre and Style ==
As an early nineteenth century adventure novel, Percival Keene splits its focus between concerns of family and social connections and nautical action and seafaring. Percival narrates his story in first person, much like Marryat's stylistically similar Peter Simple, which also focuses on the life of a young midshipman in the Napoleonic Wars. Percival Keene was published a decade after Peter Simple, however, in the second half of Marryat's writing career which many critics regard as his transition into juvenile adventure fiction. Percival Keene could also be read as a form of bildungsroman novel; there is a great deal of focus on the titular protagonist's education and process of coming-of-age as he matures from age six to eighteen.

== Literary background ==
Frederick Marryat first entered naval service at age fourteen as a midshipman aboard the Impérieuse, under the command of Lord Thomas Cochrane who may have influenced his writing of Captain Delmar and other characters. He experienced many different skirmishes around Europe during the Napoleonic Wars and was later promoted to lieutenant before eventually being promoted to commander. He developed an influential system of maritime flag signalling known as Marryat's Code, and he was "the first important English novelist after Tobias Smollett to make full and amusing use of his varied experience at sea."

== Historical background ==
=== Napoleonic Wars ===
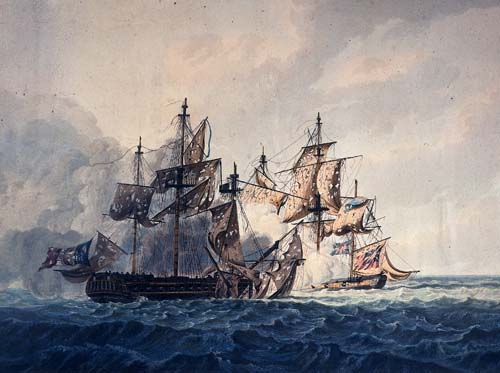

The British Royal Navy saw huge growth at the beginning of the nineteenth century during the Napoleonic Wars. During peacetime in the eighteenth century, the number of seamen in the Navy ranged from 12,000 to 20,000 men. This number grew to almost 150,000 at the peak of the Napoleonic Wars. Through the formidable size of their fleet, the Royal Navy was able to effectively disrupt France's trade outside of the continent—both through blocking shipping routes in the Atlantic and by seizing French colonies.

=== Piracy and the Slave Trade ===
The transatlantic slave trade became a lucrative business around the eighteenth and nineteenth centuries, and the trade's profits began to attract the interest of pirates. Because of this, many pirates at this time were also slavers. Due to shifting attitudes towards slavery, the British parliament passed the Slave Trade Act 1807 which abolished the slave trade. They backed this up with another act of Parliament in 1834 which specified that anyone who offended the 1807 law would be tried under existing British laws against piracy and sentenced to death. Despite the redefinition of slavery as a form of piracy, many Caribbean pirate captains welcomed runaway slaves, who made up "as much as one-third of some pirate crews." The revolts aboard slave ships La Amistad (1839) and Creole (1841) challenged new definitions of piracy. Slave traders were legally defined as pirates but, according to Sarah Ficke, "rebellious slaves from the Amistad and Creole were referred to by some newspapers not only as 'murderers' but also as 'pirates.'" There is no evidence that Marryat knew of the Amistad or Creole, but they were reported on by many British newspapers right around the publication of Percival Keene.

== Themes ==
=== British Empire and Nationalism ===
Imperialism is introduced in the text through the warring of European naval forces over colonial islands in the Caribbean. Specifically Percival explains the battles between English and French forces over Martinique and Pigeon Island. Minnie Vanderwilt's father is an extremely wealthy Dutch merchant living in Curaçao, a formerly Dutch colony. Nautical trade of colonial goods, including slaves, is also brought in by the text.

Through serving in the British Royal Navy, Percival and his fellow sailors often uphold the value of British Nationalism, displaying animosity towards their French rivals. Marryat as a writer often allows the concerns of British family connections and social status to overshadow the naval action in the text. At one point, Percival explains that his desire to inherit Captain Delmar's name, "has been the sole object of my ambition," suggesting that proper social status relating to British identity is key in the novel.

=== Piracy and Race ===
Percival's connections to the British Royal Navy frequently lead him to raid and destroy French ships, and the only specific reference to piracy in the novel comes when Percival is taken hostage by a crew of runaway slaves. The pirate crew is described as 'negro' and captain Vincent swears to kill any white sailor whom he captures, burning slave-traders alive and throwing others overboard. Percival is the first white captive that Vincent decides to spare, and the two often seem sympathetic of each other, with Percival going so far as to dye his skin a darker color to please the captain. Vincent makes several connections in the text between race and piracy, mentioning that the black race is branded with the "curse of Cain" and that, "even the white pirates feel the truth of this, or why do they hoist the black flag?" Sarah Ficke interprets the pirate episode of Percival Keene as representing the chaos of giving up national identity in favor of a racial identity. "By transforming piracy into racial warfare in this novel, Marryat expresses his anxieties about the nature of a national identity that would incorporate ethnic others as legal and political equivalents." Other critics suggest that this nationalist relationship between British sailors and black slaves is further explored by Marryat in Peter Simple

== Critical reception ==
Contemporaneous reviewers of Percival Keene noted its similarities to Marryat's other novel Peter Simple, saying that they both relied largely upon the same model. A review in an 1842 edition of Ainsworth's Magazine said "the hero is the same preternaturally tricksy, shrewd, successful being—always in scrapes, always on Fortune's high way, but never run over by the many untoward circumstances which travel the same road." Other reviewers from the same year were critical of the main character of the novel, with one regarding Percival as "a shrewd, knowing, getting-on fellow, with the most selfish disregard for everything below the sun, save his own interests and advancement," and another admitting "with all of Capt. Marryat's cleverness, the last of his sea-heroes is not the most engaging. We are amused with the adventures, but care nothing for the principal actor in them." Some saw the book in a more favorable light, however, noting that it "has a vein of humour and pleasantry which, with all its occasional coarseness, one cannot resist, it is full of life, it has one or two capital descriptions, and it is read through before it is laid down." Marryat's writing was notably enjoyed by many famous later writers, including Mark Twain, Joseph Conrad, and Ernest Hemingway. Critic Mark Spilka has suggested that Percival Keene might have served as inspiration for part of Hemingway's story The Short Happy Life of Francis Macomber.
