= Peter Simple =

Peter Simple may mean:

- Peter Simple (novel), an 1834 seafaring novel by Marryat
- Peter Simple (horse), a racehorse that won the Grand National twice
- Peter Simple, pseudonym of and newspaper column by the British journalist Michael Wharton
