= Augusta Marryat =

Augusta Marryat (bapt. 23 September 1828 – 10 May 1899) was a British children's writer and illustrator, perhaps best known for her adventure novel Left to Themselves: A Boy's Adventure in Australia (1878) – later published as The Young Lamberts. The novel is set in Australia, but she is not known to have ever visited the continent.

== Life ==
Marryat was born in Fulham, Surrey, England, the daughter of Frederick Marryat and his wife Catherine (née Shairp). Captain Marryat was a successful popular novelist and two of Augusta's sisters, Florence and Emilia, also became writers. Augusta wrote adventure fiction heavily infused with morality in her father's vein, and Florence was a prolific author of sensationalist novels who also acquired a reputation for hanging out with spiritual mediums.

She died in Surrey in 1899.

== Selected works ==
- Lost in the Jungle: A Story of the Indian Mutiny (London: Griffith and Farran, 1877).
- Left to Themselves: A Boy's Adventures in Australia (London: Frederick Warne, 1878).
- The Reverse of the Shield: or, The Adventures of Grenville Le Marchant during the Franco-Prussian War (London: Frederick Warne, 1879)

A full bibliography is available in The Cambridge Bibliography of English Literature: 1800-1900, Vol. 4.
