= The Adventures of Peter Simple =

1957 British TV period drama series

- Genre: Historical drama
- Based on: Peter Simple by Frederick Marryat
- Written by: Naomi Capon
- Directed by: Naomi Capon
- Starring: Timothy Bateson
- Country of origin: United Kingdom
- Original language: English
- No. of series: 1
- No. of episodes: 6

Production
- Producer: Naomi Capon
- Running time: 25 minutes
- Production company: BBC

Original release
- Network: BBC One
- Release: 13 January – 17 February 1957

The Adventures of Peter Simple is a British period adventure television series which aired in six parts on BBC 1 in 1957. It stars Timothy Bateson in the title role, a midshipman in the Royal Navy at the time of the Napoleonic Wars. It is based on the 1834 novel Peter Simple by Frederick Marryat.

Other actors who appeared in the series include Sam Kydd, Ronald Adam, Patrick Cargill, Nadia Cattouse, Barry Letts, Andre Charisse, Rosamund Greenwood, André Maranne, John Phillips, Kynaston Reeves, Sally Travers, George Woodbridge, Wilfrid Brambell, Peter Bull, Robert Raglan and Willoughby Goddard.

== Main cast ==
- Timothy Bateson as Peter Simple
- Thomas Heathcote as Terence O'Brien
- Evelyn Cordeau as Celeste
- Michael Goodliffe as Peter's Uncle
- John Serret as Colonel O'Brien

== Bibliography ==
- Ellen Baskin. Serials on British Television, 1950-1994. Scolar Press, 1996.
