= Masterman Ready, or the Wreck of the Pacific =

1841 novel by Frederick Marryat

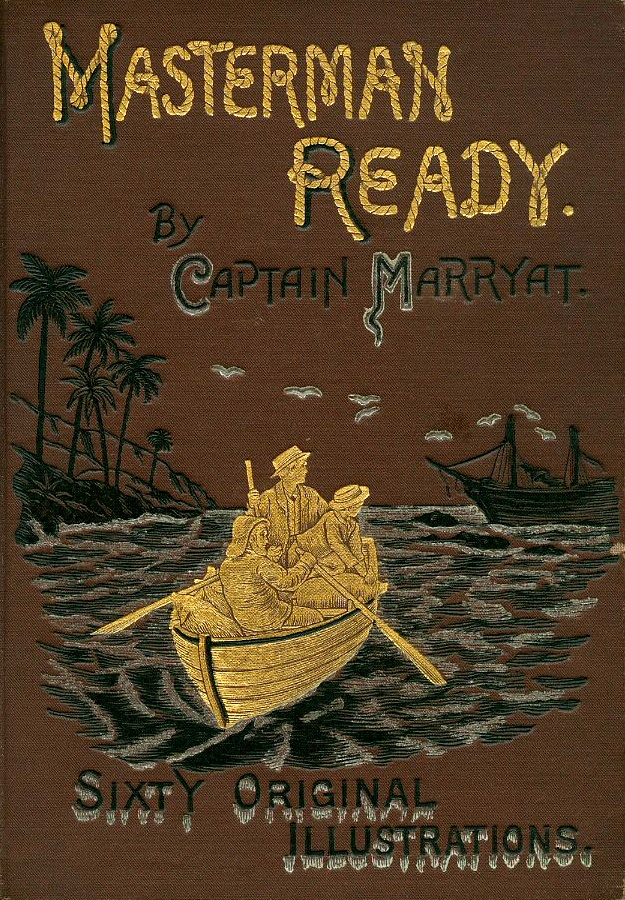
- 1886 illustrated edition
- Author: Frederick Marryat
- Language: English
- Publication date: 1841
- Publication place: United Kingdom

Masterman Ready, or the Wreck of the Pacific is a robinsonade children's novel published in 1841 by Frederick Marryat. The book follows the adventures of the Seagrave family who are shipwrecked at sea, and survive on a desert island with the assistance of veteran sailor Masterman Ready.

== Plot ==
The Seagrave family are returning to New South Wales on board the Pacific when a storm strikes, wrecking the ship. The crew escape in a lifeboat leaving the passengers to their fate. The Seagrave family, together with their young black female servant Juno, and the veteran sailor Masterman Ready, are shipwrecked on a desert island. The family learn to survive many obstacles, helped by Ready's long experience of life as a seaman. The worse threat comes when a tribe of natives attacks the party, resulting in the death of Ready. Rescue comes when the captain of the Pacific, who the family thought had died in the storm, arrives in a schooner.

== Themes ==
Masterman Ready was one of the first historical adventures written for young readers. It was written in response to the 1812 book The Swiss Family Robinson by Johann Wyss. As a sailor of long experience, Marryat was annoyed that Wyss had portrayed being shipwrecked as a romantic adventure and he disapproved of the ignorance regarding flora and fauna displayed by Wyss. The Seagrave family in Marryat's novel have to overcome many hazards, beginning with the initial storm which wrecks the ship and injures the passengers.

The book throughout has a strong moral and pious tone. It contains many long reminiscences of Ready's life at sea, in which thanks is given to God, and of the comfort to be found in the Bible. Likewise the family learn lessons on natural history and discover evidence for God's benevolence everywhere.

== Reception ==
For many years Masterman Ready was one of the most popular adventure stories for children. It was ranked alongside The Children of the New Forest as the best of Marryat's books for children and it was at one time thought Masterman Ready would "always be the more popular of the two, from the neverceasing attractiveness of its subject matter." The book is now less popular than it once was, partly because moral lessons constantly intrude on the action.
