= Robert Folkestone Williams =

Robert Folkestone Williams (1809 – 1870) was an English novelist, poet, journalist, historian, biographer, magazine editor, and professor.

== Life ==
He was born in London in 1809, the son of Edward Williams, a surgeon. Robert originally studied surgery under George James Guthrie, but decided on a literary career.

He wrote domestic novels and historical novels on the life of William Shakespeare, the English Civil War, and the early eighteenth century. His novel Sir Roger de Coverley (1846) was published under the pseudonym Frank Ranelagh.

Williams's fictional works were widely read, with his Shakespeare novels being the best known. He was also well known in literary circles and was a close friend of Frederick Marryat, whose unfinished novel The Little Savage Williams completed, and Theodore Hook, whose unfinished novel Fathers and Sons Williams also completed for publication.

He served as Professor of Ancient and Modern History at Cavalry College, Richmond, and edited The New Monthly Magazine.

In 1839 he married Rosa Lucy du Ponte, the widow of William Francis Player, and they had three children. Williams died in 1870.

== Works ==
=== Novels ===
- Mephistopheles in England: or, The Confessions of a Prime Minister (1835)
- Eureka: A Prophecy of the Future (1837)
- Shakspeare and his Friends: or, "The Golden Age" of Merry England (1838)
- The Youth of Shakspeare (1839)
- The Secret Passion (1844)
- Maids of Honour: A Tale of the Court of George I (1845)
- Sir Roger de Coverley: A Tale of the Court of Charles the Second (1846)
- Strawberry Hill: An Historical Novel (1847)
- The Luttrells: or, The Two Marriages (1850)
- Jack Scudamore's Daughter: A Domestic Story (1865)

=== Poetry ===
- Rhymes and Rhapsodies (1833)

=== History and biography ===
- Memoirs of Sophia Dorothea, Consort of George I (1845)
- The Court and Times of James the First, 2 vols (1848)
- Domestic Memoirs of the Royal Family and of the Court of England, 3 vols (1860)
- Lives of the English Cardinals, Including Historical Notices of the Papal Court (1868)

=== Miscellaneous ===
- An Historical Sketch of the Art of Sculpture in Wood, from the Earliest Period to the Present Time (1835)

== Citations ==
- Bassett, Troy J. (31 October 2024). "Robert Folkestone Williams". victorianresearch.org.
- Jeaffreson, John Cordy (1858). Novels and Novelists, from Elizabeth to Victoria, Vol 2. Hurst and Blackett. p. 403-404.
