= Frank Marryat =

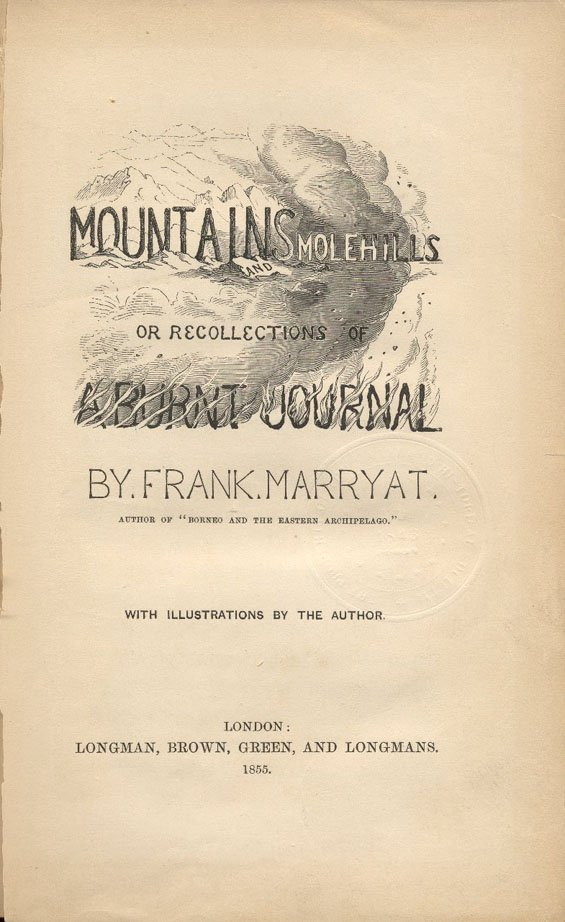
Mountains and Molehills: or Recollections of a Burnt Journal (1855)

Samuel Francis Marryat (1826–1855), known as Frank Marryat, was an English sailor, artist, and author. He was one of the sons of Captain Frederick Marryat.

== Early life ==
Marryat's early years were spent at Langham, Norfolk, where his father had an estate. In 1830, at the precociously early age of about four or five, he was admitted to the nearby Holt Grammar School, at the same time as his older brother Frederick. The school register notes his year of birth as 1825. He later continued his education in Paris.

== Service in the Royal Navy ==
He joined the Royal Navy at 14 years old as midshipman and made a number of drawings during his service on HMS Samarang in the Far East in 1843. He planned to publish these without any accompanying text, but then added text from his own, and colleagues' journals to produce his first book in 1848.

== Travels to California and infection by yellow fever ==
In 1850, he left England for California via Panama with a manservant and three hunting dogs. This provided the material for another book, published in New York in 1855, a sportsman-tourist's chronicle of California in the early 1850s: hunting, horse races, bear and bull fights, and an Englishman's bemused comments on social life in San Francisco, Stockton, and the gold fields. There is also a long and vivid description of the San Francisco Fire of 1851. He had returned to England in 1853, married, and prepared to return with his new bride to California that same year. However, he had contracted yellow fever on board ship, which forced him to cut the trip short and return to England. He died there shortly before his book was published, under the title Mountains and Molehills, or Memoirs of a Burnt Journal.
