= Alexander Dingwall Bateson =

British barrister and High Court judge

- Born: 30 April 1866; Allerton, Liverpool, England
- Died: 11 January 1935 (aged 68); London, England
- Spouse: Isabel Mary Latham (m. 1893)
- Children: 6

Sir Alexander Dingwall Bateson (30 April 1866 – 11 January 1935) was a British barrister and High Court judge. A shipping specialist, he sat in the Probate, Divorce and Admiralty Division from 1925 until his death in 1935.

== Biography ==
Bateson was born in Allerton, Liverpool, the youngest of the six sons of William Gandy Bateson, partner in a prominent Liverpool firm of shipping solicitors, and of Agnes Dingwall Bateson, daughter of Sir Thomas Blaikie. A brother was the English rugby union player Harold Dingwall Bateson.

He was educated at Rugby School and at Trinity College, Oxford, where he took third-class honours in classical moderations (1887) and graduated with a pass BA degree in 1888. He was called to the Bar by the Inner Temple in 1891, and began his career in the chambers of Joseph Walton, later Mr Justice Walton. Drawing on Walton's backing and his own family connections, Bateson specialized in shipping work, mainly in salvage and collision cases in the Admiralty Division and sometime in the Commercial Court, and built a substantial practice. He was appointed junior counsel to the Admiralty for Admiralty Division work in 1909, and the following year he relinquished the appointment when he became a King's Counsel. He was elected a bencher of the Inner Temple in 1920.

In 1925, on the recommendation of Viscount Cave, Dingwall was selected to fill the additional judgeship created by the Administration of Justice Act 1925 in order to relieve congestion in the Probate, Divorce and Admiralty Division. He was duly appointed on 12 May 1925, and received the customary knighthood. During the First World War, he made Thomas splints at the Kensington Red Cross depot. He died at his home in London on 11 January 1935.

== Family ==
Dingwall married Isabel Mary Latham (died 1919), fourth daughter of William Latham QC, in 1893; they had four sons and two daughters. Sir Dingwall Latham Bateson, President of the Law Society, was his son.
