= Timothy Bateson =

British actor (1926–2009)

- Born: Timothy Dingwall Bateson; 3 April 1926; London, England
- Died: 15 September 2009 (aged 83); London, England
- Occupation: Actor
- Years active: 1947–2007
- Spouse: Sheila Shand Gibbs (m. 1953)
- Children: 3

Timothy Dingwall Bateson (3 April 1926 – 15 September 2009) was an English actor.

== Life and career ==
Born in London, the son of solicitor Dingwall Latham Bateson and the great-nephew of rugby player Harold Dingwall Bateson, he was educated at Lockers Park School in Hertfordshire, Uppingham School in Rutland and Wadham College, Oxford. At Oxford, he read history, rowed cox for the Wadham College Boat Club during Eights Week and performed in the Oxford University Dramatic Society.

Bateson's stage credits included the first British production of Samuel Beckett's Waiting for Godot in 1955 at the Arts Theatre in London in a production directed by Peter Hall. In 1957 he starred in the BBC adventure serial The Adventures of Peter Simple.

He appeared in many film, television and radio productions including The Avengers, The Cadfael Chronicles, Doctor Who (in the serial entitled "The Ribos Operation") and Labyrinth.

He also provided the voices for several characters in the children's TV series Tugs (1989). Most notably, he provided the voice of O.J., the oldest member of the Star Fleet.

Since 1994, he did the voice of Measley from the audiotape version of The Animals of Farthing Wood.

Bateson was featured in many productions of Focus on the Family Radio Theater. Among his appearances on the program were in A Christmas Carol (1996), where he doubled as narrator and as the Ghost of Christmas Present; Dietrich Bonhoeffer: The Cost Of Freedom (1997), portraying Dr. Karl Bonhoeffer; Ben-Hur (2001), portraying Balthasar; Father Gilbert Mysteries: The Silver Cord (2004), portraying Mr. Lehman; and Silas Marner (2007), portraying Mr. Macey.

He voiced the house-elf Kreacher in Harry Potter and the Order of the Phoenix, his last work.

== Family and death ==
In 1953, Bateson married actress Sheila Shand Gibbs, with whom he had three children, Elizabeth, Andrew and Caroline. He and his wife were committed Christians. He died in London aged 83, on 15 September 2009.

== Selected filmography ==
- Nicholas Nickleby (1947) – Lord Verisopht
- Vice Versa (1948) – Coker
- The Guinea Pig (1948) – Tracey
- The History of Mr. Polly (1949) – Apprentice (uncredited)
- White Corridors (1951) – Dr. Cook
- Never Look Back (1952) as Court Official (uncredited)
- Sunday Night Theatre (1952–1954) – Val
- Carrington V.C. (1955) – 1st Soldier in NAAFI (uncredited)
- Richard III (1955) – Ostler
- The Black Arrow (1958) – Lord Shoreby
- Tread Softly Stranger (1958) – Fletcher
- Mother Courage and Her Children (1959) – 'Swiss Cheese'
- Yesterday's Enemy (1959) – Simpson (uncredited)
- The Mouse That Roared (1959) – Roger
- Devil's Bait (1959) – Dentist (uncredited)
- Bleak House (1959) – William Guppy
- Our Man in Havana (1959) – Rudy (uncredited)
- The Shakedown (1960) – Estate Agent
- The Big Day (1960) – Clerk
- There Was a Crooked Man (1960) – Flash Dan
- Barnaby Rudge (1960) – Simon Tappertit
- The Unstoppable Man (1960) – Rocky
- Seven Keys (1961) – Bank Teller (uncredited)
- What a Carve Up! (1961) – Porter – (US: 'No Place like Homicide')
- On the Fiddle (1961) – Stretcher Bearer (uncredited)
- The Day the Earth Caught Fire (1961) – Printer in Printroom (uncredited)
- The Golden Rabbit (1961) – Henry Tucker
- Ring-a-Ding Rhythm (1962) – Coffee shop owner
- Crooks Anonymous (1962) – Partrige
- The Girl on the Boat (1962) – Purser
- Jigsaw (1962) – Porter (uncredited)
- Doctor in Distress (1963) – Mr. Holly
- Seventy Deadly Pills (1964) – Goldstone
- Father Came Too! (1964) – Wally
- Nightmare (1964) – Barman
- The Evil of Frankenstein (1964) – Hypnotized Man (uncredited)
- The Knack ...and How to Get It (1965) – Junkyard Owner
- The Wrong Box (1966) – Clerk
- Thirty-Minute Theatre (1966) – Big Ted
- After the Fox (1966) – Michael O'Reilly (uncredited)
- Danger Route (1967) – Halliwell
- Torture Garden (1967) – Fairground Barker
- The Anniversary (1968) – Mr. Bird
- Z-Cars (1968, TV) – Andrew Rogers
- Twisted Nerve (1968) – Mr. Groom
- The Italian Job (1969) – Dentist
- 1917 (1970) – Corporal Falk
- Doctor at Large (1971, TV) – Mr. Clifford
- Kindly Leave the Kerb (1971, TV)
- Please Sir! (1971, TV) – Dutton
- The Rivals of Sherlock Holmes (1971, TV) – Goujon
- Barlow at Large (1973) – Smeed
- David Copperfield (1974) – Mr. Dick
- Autobiography of a Princess (1975) – Blackmailer
- The Good Life (1976, TV) – Arthur Bailey
- Joseph Andrews (1977) – Master of Hounds
- The Duchess of Duke Street (1977, TV) – Mr. Bream
- Doctor Who: The Ribos Operation (1978, TV) – Binro
- Last of the Summer Wine (1978, TV) – Amos Hames
- Going Straight (1978, TV) – Oaksey
- All Creatures Great and Small (1978, TV) – Mr. Beckwith
- As You Like It (1978) – Sir Oliver Martext
- Pinocchio (1978, TV) – Schoolmaster
- A Hitch in Time (1978) – Headmaster (uncredited)
- The Famous Five (1978, TV) – Professor Hayling
- Diary of a Nobody (1979) – Cummings
- Rings on Their Fingers (1979) – Meter Reader
- Tanglewoods' Secret (1980) – Mr. Tandy
- Treasures of the Snow (1980) – Portier
- Grange Hill (1980–1983) – Mr. Thomson
- Loophole (1981) – 3rd Interviewer
- Chintz (1981) – Shop Assistant
- Terry and June (1981) – Mervyn
- Q.E.D. (1982) – Alfie
- The Hunchback of Notre Dame (1982) – Commerce
- High Road to China (1983) – Alec Wedgeworth
- Don't Wait Up (1983) – Mr. Burton
- A Christmas Carol (1984) – Mr. Fezziwig
- Minder (1984) – Railwayman
- Ever Decreasing Circles (1984) – Laurence
- Dramarama (1985) – Keeper
- Labyrinth (1986) – The Worm / The Four Guards / Goblin (voice)
- Foreign Body (1986) – Agent at Harley Street
- East of Ipswich (1987) – Mr. Macklin
- Hi-de-Hi! (1987) – Charlie
- Chelmsford 123 (1988) – Latin Tutor
- A Handful of Dust (1988) – MacDougal
- Tugs (1989–1990, TV Series) – O.J. / Eddie / Little Ditcher / Lord Stinker / Garbage Corporation Master / Big Mickey (voice)
- Never Come Back (1990, TV Series) – Poole
- Zorro (1990–1993, TV Series) – Padre Benites
- Shakespeare: The Animated Tales (1992) – Antigonus (voice)
- 2point4 Children (1992) – Mr Podd
- The Animals of Farthing Wood (1994) – Measley (Audiotape only)
- True Blue (1996) – Porter
- For My Baby (1997) – Max Liebman
- Merlin (1998) – Father Abbot
- Les Misérables (1998) – Banker
- Midsomer Murders (1999, TV) – Mr. Jocelyne
- The Criminal (1999) – Thomas
- The Messenger: The Story of Joan of Arc (1999) – English Judge
- The Clandestine Marriage (1999) – Gaoler
- Barbara (2000, TV) – Mr. Dugdale
- The 10th Kingdom (2000, TV) – Tooth Fairy
- The Discovery of Heaven (2001) – Mr. Keller
- All or Nothing (2002) – Harold
- Fakers (2004) – Old Gezzer
- Ladies in Lavender (2004) – Mr. Hallett
- Oliver Twist (2005) – Parson
- Mrs. Palfrey at the Claremont (2005) – Summers
- My Hero (2006, TV) – Leo
- Terry Pratchett's Hogfather (2006, TV) – The Lecturer
- Harry Potter and the Order of the Phoenix (2007) – Kreacher (voice) (final film role)
