= The Settlers in Canada =

1844 novel by Frederick Marryat

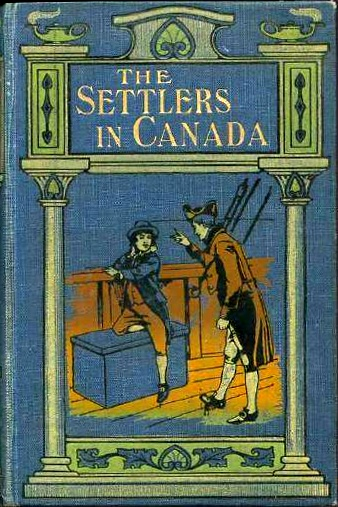
- Author: Frederick Marryat
- Language: English
- Publication date: 1844
- Publication place: United Kingdom

The Settlers in Canada is a children's novel written by Frederick Marryat, and published in 1844. The novel is set in the wilderness of Upper Canada in the 1790s. It describes the adventures of an immigrant family who settle near Lake Ontario, despite the threats from the native people and wild animals.

== Plot summary ==
The story begins in England with a reasonably well-off family (the Campbells) who have inherited the family estate. Their eldest son has gone to college and the second son is in the navy. One day a claimant to the estate appears. His claim proves to be true and the Campbells must give up the estate.

Mr. Campbell had given up his business to take over the estate and with the legal costs as well they have very little money left. They just have enough to journey to emigrate to Canada, and take up a settlement near Lake Ontario. The family is united in their troubles and they pull together to make their farm a success, in the process, dealing with the weather, hostile natives and forest fires. They are aided by an eccentric but helpful hunter Malachi Bone, and they rescue young Percival from hostile Indians and welcome new immigrants to their farm.

Eventually a letter arrives to say that the relative who had taken the estate, has died, and it is now theirs once again. Mr. and Mrs. Campbell travel home and the rest of the family go their separate ways.

== Writing and publication ==
Marrayat wrote the novel following the success of his first children's novel, Masterman Ready (1841). Marryat had visited Canada in 1837, and had acquired several hundred acres of land on the Canadian side of the Great Lakes where he set his work.

The novel was published in 1844 and was his twenty-first book.

== Themes ==
The novel is set in the wilderness of Upper Canada in the 1790s, and follows the fortunes of the Campbell family who settle near Lake Ontario. The theme of the work probably owes something to the historical romances of James Fenimore Cooper which dealt with frontier and Indian life in the early American days. Marryat's story similarly combines adventure with colonial pastoral. The rigors of pioneering and combating the native threat shape the Campbell family into successful immigrants, in part by teaching them the ways of the indigenous natives.

The novel is often cited for containing the first known use of the phrase "paddle your own canoe". The phrase appears in the eighth chapter when an indigenous chief reflects on the differences between the European and native religions:

"You believe in one God—so do we; you call him one name—we call him another; we don’t speak the same language, that is the reason. You say, suppose you do good, you go to land of Good Spirits—we say so too. Then Indians and Yangees (that is, English) both try to gain same object, only try in not the same way. Now I think that it much better that, as we all go along together, that every man paddle his own canoe. That my thought."
