= Dingwall Latham Bateson =

British lawyer

Sir Dingwall Latham Bateson CBE MC
- Born: 7 July 1898; Kensington, London, UK
- Died: 29 January 1967; Merstham, Surrey, UK
- Occupation: Solicitor
- Spouse: Naomi Judith

Sir Dingwall Latham Bateson, CBE MC (7 July 1898 – 29 January 1967) was a British solicitor and President of the Law Society.

== Personal life ==
Bateson was born on 7 July 1898 in Kensington, London. He was the son of judge Sir Alexander Dingwall Bateson and Isabel Mary, the fourth daughter of William Latham QC. He had three brothers and two sisters.

In 1922, he married Naomi Judith, eldest daughter of composer Sir Walter Galpin Alcock. They had two sons and one daughter. One son, Timothy, became an actor.

Bateson advised Noël Coward on financial affairs; Coward, in gratitude, named his speedboat "Dingo" after Bateson. Bateson was also friends with Sir Roland Gwynne, Mayor of Eastbourne 1928-1931 and purported lover of serial killer Dr John Bodkin Adams: he left Bateson his whole estate in his will, though in the end Bateson predeceased him.

== Career ==
=== Military service ===
Bateson served in the King's Royal Rifle Corps, British Army during the First World War. As part of the 1919 King's Birthday Honours, he was awarded the Military Cross (MC) whilst a second lieutenant attached to the 2nd Battalion, Gloucestershire Regiment "for distinguished service in connection with military operations in the Balkans".

=== Professional career ===
Bateson was a solicitor with Slaughter and May, and then a partner at Walters & Hart Solicitors. From 1952 to 1953, he was president of the Law Society.

He was appointed a Commander of the Order of the British Empire (CBE) in the 1946 Birthday Honours. He was knighted as a Knight Bachelor in the 1953 Coronation Honours.

== Death ==
Bateson died in a shooting accident in Merstham, Surrey, on 29 January 1967 aged 68.
