= The Blood of the Vampire =

1897 novel by Florence Marryat

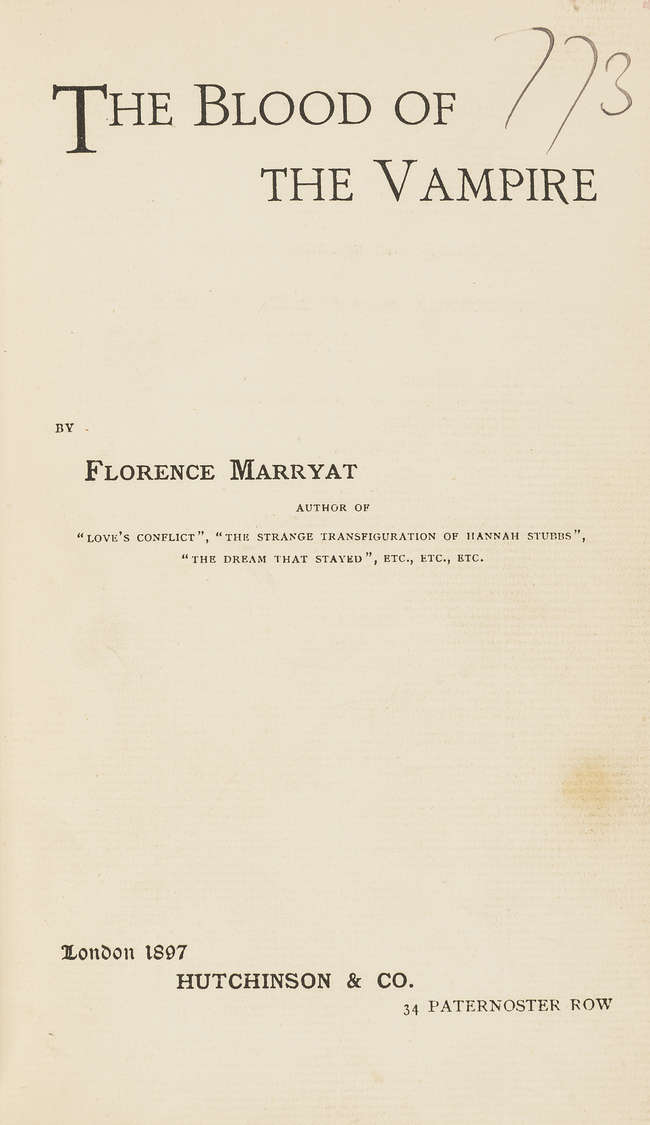
- Title page of The Blood of the Vampire's first edition
- Author: Florence Marryat
- Language: English
- Genre: Gothic; horror; vampire
- Publisher: Hutchinson & Co.
- Publication date: 1897
- Publication place: England

The Blood of the Vampire is a Gothic novel by Florence Marryat, published in 1897. The protagonist, Harriet Brandt, is a mixed-race psychic vampire who kills unintentionally. The novel follows Harriet after she leaves a Jamaican convent for Europe, and her ill-fated attempts to integrate with Victorian society.

One contemporary reviewer scathed the novel, comparing it unfavourably to Marryat's previous works and another vampire text published in the same year—Bram Stoker's Dracula. Although The Blood of the Vampire is still relatively unknown, it has received increased critical coverage since the end of the twentieth century. Academics highlight the novel's treatment of race, eugenics, and social class. Marryat's conception of vampires as medical rather than supernatural has also elicited interest, and critics frequently compare it both to Dracula and Sheridan Le Fanu's Carmilla (1872).

== Plot ==
The novel opens in Heyst, Belgium, where 21-year-old Harriet Brandt meets two English women, Margaret and Elinor. Harriet reveals that she was raised in a Jamaican convent, following the death of her parents ten years prior. When she came of age, she used her inheritance to move to Europe to start a new life. Although one of the women finds Harriet distasteful, Margaret Pullen likes Harriet. Harriet is fond of Margaret's young child, but Margaret is cautious about letting Harriet hold her. Harriet reminisces about her childhood on a plantation, saying that she misses its overseer because he let her whip the slaves when they were lazy. After Harriet touches her, Margaret suddenly feels drained and begs Harriet to let her go. After finding out that she is wealthy, a local aristocrat, the Baroness Gobelli, invites Harriet back to England. Harriet spends more time with Margaret's child, who becomes severely ill.

A medical professional—Doctor Phillips—is summoned. He does not know what is wrong with the child, but recognises her surname because he knew her father. The baby grows ill and dies. Harriet travels to England, and Harriet begins spending many hours with the Baroness' young son, Bobby. She also meets and falls in love with a socialist, Anthony Pennell. Bobby also becomes ill, and the Baroness accuses her of being cursed with both "black blood" and "vampire blood". Harriet, frightened, returns to Doctor Phillips, who tells her about her family history. Her father was a doctor who performed experiments on his plantation's slaves until they revolted and killed him, and her mother was the daughter of a slave of the Judge of Barbados. He advises Harriet that she should never marry, and instead withdraw from society. Shortly thereafter, Bobby dies.

Harriet returns to Anthony, who tells her that Dr Phillips' theory is ridiculous, and that they should ignore him and marry. For their honeymoon, they travel to Nice. The next morning, Harriet wakes to find Anthony dead beside her. She leaves a written will bequeathing her possessions to Margaret Pullen, and then kills herself by taking chloral.

== Genre ==
Scholars position The Blood of the Vampire as a non-traditional Gothic text. Greta Depledge notes that, although Gothic fiction is traditionally associated with the supernatural and its capacity for horror, Marryat's novel is neither explicitly supernatural nor straightforwardly horrifying. Academic Helena Ifill writes that the Female Gothic typified by Ann Radcliffe was no longer relevant to readers at the end of the nineteenth century. Female Gothic imagery related to women's vulnerability, but, by the time of Marryat's novel, women were experiencing "unprecedented levels of freedom and responsibility". (Note: Ifill clarifies that "[t]his is not to say that women did not continue to feel oppressed or reduced in patriarchal structures, and Female Gothic metaphors of entrapment remain a part of twentieth-century Female Gothic literature [...].) Also remarked upon by Ifill is that, although the vampire is a Gothic monster, Belgium is not transformed into a Gothic city, as in Dracula's London.

== Contemporary reception ==
In a January 1898 review, The Speaker wrote that Dracula had inspired The Blood of the Vampire as part of "a wave of imitations by inferior writers". The anonymous reviewer said it lacked the charms of her previous work, describing it as tedious. They also objected to the text's sensationalist elements and criticised Harriet's illegitimate birth as the daughter of a mad scientist and a "voluptuous Creole slave".

== Analysis ==
=== Race ===
The text associates Harriet's mixed race background with her vampirism. H. L. Malchow notes that vampires and mixed-race individuals elicited similar fears from Victorian readers; the ability of both to pass—as human or white-skinned—resulted in anxiety about "pollution of the blood". Ifill advanced that thought, writing that Harriet's efficacy as a vampire-predator is determined by her ability to pass, giving her access to victims. In Reading Vampire Gothic Through Blood, Aspasia Stephanou points out that Harriet's mother—the child of a slave—passed on "not only the inherited black [...] blood of her mother, but also the vampire strain". Stephanou argues that Harriet's vampirism is associated with her blackness because Victorian readers conceived of blackness as hypersexual and gluttonous. Others have concurred. Academic Ardel Haefele-Thomas notes that Marryat racialises Harriet by comparing her to animals, such as snakes. The novel's English characters are made to feel sick by the way she eats.

[Harriet]: “We had plenty of niggers on the coffee plantation, regular African fellows with woolly heads and blubber lips and yellow whites to their eyes. When I was a little thing of four years old Pete used to let me whip the little niggers for a treat when they had done anything wrong. It used to make me laugh to see them wriggle their legs under the whip and cry!”

— Florence Marryat, The Blood of the Vampire

The novel's treatment of race is not always read as straightforwardly xenophobic. Haefele-Thomas says that Marryat characterises the British as "hypocritical and unsympathetic" to marginalised groups. Ifill concurs, noting that Harriet's pleasant childhood memories of whipping slaves reflects upon "the morally unwholesome conditions in the Western world". The Washington Post's literary critic Michael Dirda posits that the novel supplies non-vampiric explanations for the deaths occurring around Harriet, suggesting that she might be a victim of racial prejudice.

=== Gender and sexuality ===
Gender and femininity has been considered alongside the novel's treatment of race. Both Helena Ifill and A. N. Bulamur associate Harriet Brandt with the anxiety posed by the New Woman—a 19th-century idea characterised by financial independence and confidence. Approaches to gender and sexuality in The Blood of the Vampire are frequently mingled with race. For example, Sarah Willburn analyses Harriet's "psychical" feeding on Margaret as an instance of Stephen Arata's reverse colonisation. (Note: The way in which Harriet's proximity saps Margaret's energy could be read allegorically as what Stephen Arata has termed ‘‘reverse colonization’’: "At the end of the century, when the British Empire's power is waning, Harriet's magnetic attraction to and depleting force upon Margaret could be read as a wealthy Jamaican colonizing the concept of English womanhood.") Willburn goes on to discuss how Harriet's feeding is characterised as "a lesbian threat [...] unsophisticated, practically accidental", but nonetheless "a serious threat".

=== Comparisons to Dracula and Carmilla ===
The Blood of the Vampire is overshadowed by two other Gothic vampire novels—Stoker's Dracula and Sheridan Le Fanu's Carmilla (1872). As a result, comparisons between the three are fairly common. Susan Ziegler writes that the supernatural explanation for vampirism in Dracula is dismissed in favour of a medical one, making it an aspect of her race. In Dracula, the primary association of blood is with Christianity, compared to Marryat's novel which makes it symbolic of heredity and eugenics. Marryat's vampire is separated from Le Fanu's Carmilla is that Harriet is completely unaware she is a vampire; Haefele-Thomas points out that only the title would indicate to Victorian readers that they were reading a vampire story.

Critics have also noted similarities. Greta Depledge's introduction to a 2010 version observes that, in Dracula, Carmilla, and The Blood of the Vampire, the deaths of the three main vampires come as the result of medical intervention. Of Carmilla's vampire hunters, two are medical practitioners; Dracula's Abraham Van Helsing and John Seward are both doctors; and Dr Phillips influences Harriet's decision to kill herself. Depledge relates that the medical profession is tied to the female vampires of each text because of the Victorian diagnosis of hysteria—a condition of excess emotionality in women. To deal with her vampirism, Dr Phillips instructs Harriet to practice self-help and self-reliance; this is similar to the advice given by medical professionals to treat the incurable hysteria.

Haefele-Thomas argues that, although there is "no clear evidence" Marryat had read Carmilla, it is likely. Both novels reflect anxieties over an increasingly multicultural Britain.

== Bibliography ==
=== Books ===
- Haefele-Thomas, Ardel (2012). "'One does things abroad that one would not dream of doing in England': Miscegenation and Queer Female Vampirism in J. Sheridan Le Fanu's Carmilla and Florence Marryat's The Blood of the Vampire". Queer Others in Victorian Gothic: Transgressing Monstrosity. Cardiff: University of Wales Press. pp. 96–119. ISBN 978-0708324646. JSTOR j.ctt9qhdw4.8.
- Marryat, Florence (2010). "Vampirism, hysteria, sexual aggression and the 'other'". In Depledge, Greta (ed.). The Blood of the Vampire. Brighton: Victorian Secrets. pp. xii. ISBN 9781906469160.
- Malchow, H. L. (1996). Gothic Images of Race in Nineteenth-Century England. Stanford: Stanford University Press. ISBN 0804726647.
- Stephanou, Aspasia (2014). Reading Vampire Gothic Through Blood. New York: Palgrave Macmillan. ISBN 978-1-349-46784-6.
- Ziegler, Susan (2008). Inventing the Addict: Drugs, Race, and Sexuality in Nineteenth-Century British and American Literature. Amherst: University of Massachusetts Press. ISBN 978-1-55849-680-4.

=== Journals and newspapers ===
- Bulamur, A. N. (2019). "Fin-de-Siècle and Motion Sickness in Florence Marryat's The Blood of the Vampire". Gaziantep University Journal of Social Sciences. 18: 60–70. doi:10.21547/jss.593965.
- Dirda, Michael (29 October 2019). "Sure, 'Dracula' is great, but don't overlook Florence Marryat's 'The Blood of the Vampire'". The Washington Post.
- Hammack, Brenda Mann (2008). "Florence Marryat's Female Vampire and the Scientizing of Hybridity". SEL: Studies in English Literature 1500–1900. 48 (4): 885–896. ISSN 0039-3657. JSTOR 40071373.
- Ifill, Helena (30 June 2019). "Florence Marryat's The Blood of the Vampire (1897): Negotiating Anxieties of Genre and Gender at the Fin de Siècle" (PDF). Victorian Popular Fictions Journal. 1: 80–99. doi:10.46911/GSWJ1008.
- "Fiction". The Speaker: The Liberal Review. 17: 29. 1 January 1898. ProQuest 6369151.
- Willburn, Sarah (2008). "The Savage Magnet: Racialization of the Occult Body in Victorian Fiction". Women's Writing. 15 (3): 436–453. doi:10.1080/09699080802444892. S2CID 162238911.
