= The Children of the New Forest =

1847 children's novel by Frederick Marryat

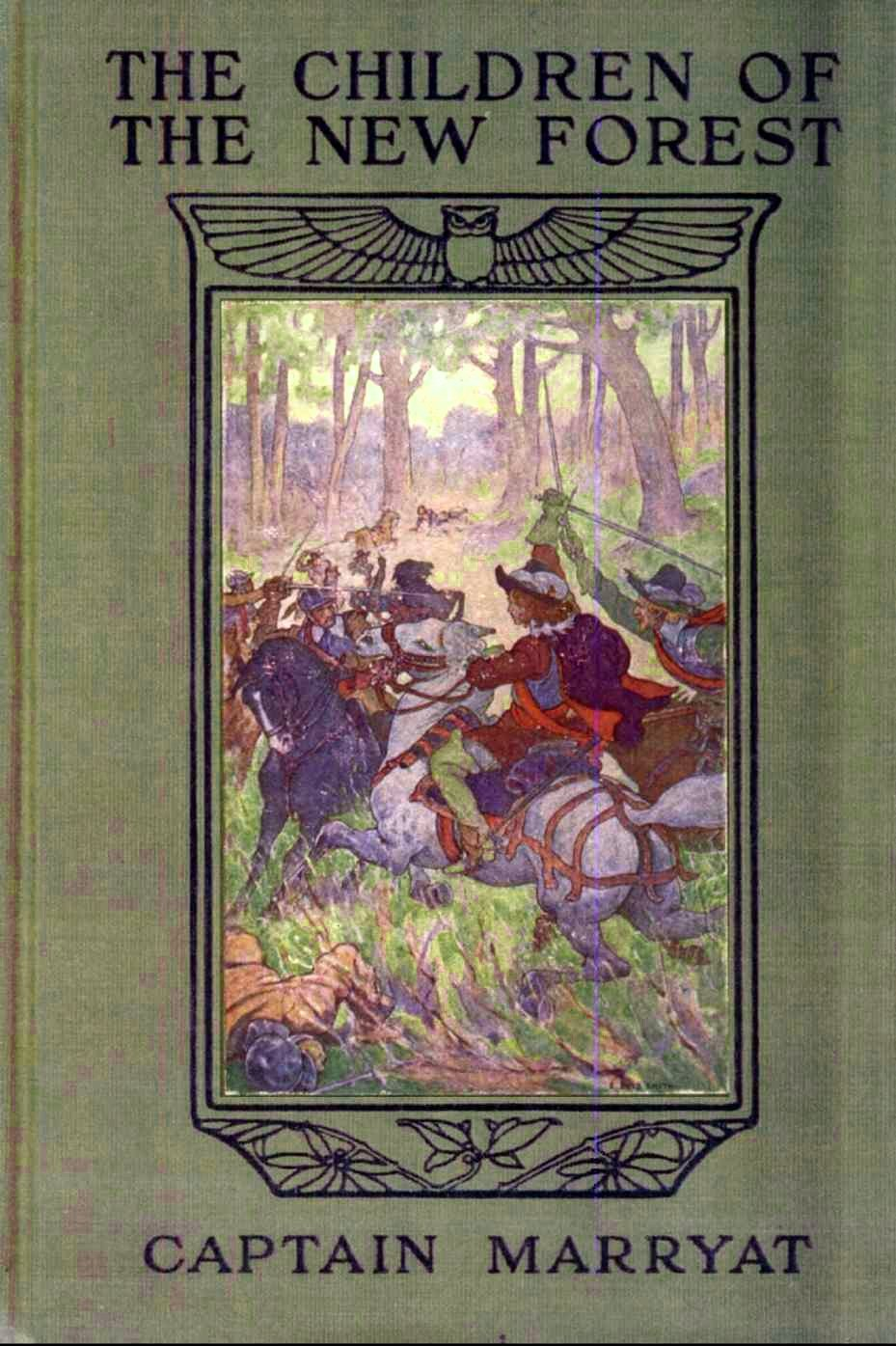
- 1911 illustrated edition
- Author: Frederick Marryat
- Language: English
- Publisher: H. Hurst
- Publication date: 1847
- Publication place: United Kingdom

The Children of the New Forest is a children's novel published in 1847 by Frederick Marryat. It is set in the time of the English Civil War and the Commonwealth. The story follows the fortunes of the four Beverley children who are orphaned during the war, and hide from their Roundhead oppressors in the shelter of the New Forest where they learn to live off the land.

== Plot summary ==
The story begins in 1647 when King Charles I has been defeated in the civil war and has fled from London towards the New Forest. Parliamentary soldiers pursuing him decide to torch Arnwood, the house of Colonel Beverley, a Cavalier officer killed at the Battle of Naseby. The four orphan children of the house - Edward, Humphrey, Alice and Edith - are believed to have died in the flames, but they are saved by Jacob Armitage, an elderly verderer, who hides them in his isolated cottage and disguises them as his grandchildren.

Under Armitage's guidance, the children adapt from their genteel lifestyle to that of simple foresters. After the old man's death, Edward takes charge and the children develop and expand the farmstead, aided by the entrepreneurial spirit of the younger brother Humphrey. They are assisted by a gypsy boy, Pablo, whom they rescue from a pitfall trap. A sub-plot involves a hostile Puritan gamekeeper named Corbould who seeks to harm Edward and his family. Edward also encounters the sympathetic Puritan, Heatherstone, placed in charge of the Royal land in the New Forest, and rescues his daughter, Patience, in a house-fire. Edward leaves the cottage and works as a secretary for Heatherstone, but Edward maintains the pretence that he is the grandson of Jacob Armitage.

Edward eventually joins the army of the future King Charles II, but after the Royalist defeat at the Battle of Worcester, he returns to the New Forest where he learns that Heatherstone has been awarded the old Arnwood estate. Disillusioned by this, and by Patience's apparent rejection of his declarations of love, Edward flees to France. His sisters are sent away to be brought up as aristocratic ladies and his brother continues to live in the New Forest. Edward learns that Patience does, in fact, love him, and that Heatherstone had acquired the Arnwood estate for Edward, but he works as a mercenary soldier in exile until the Restoration when they are reunited.

== Writing ==
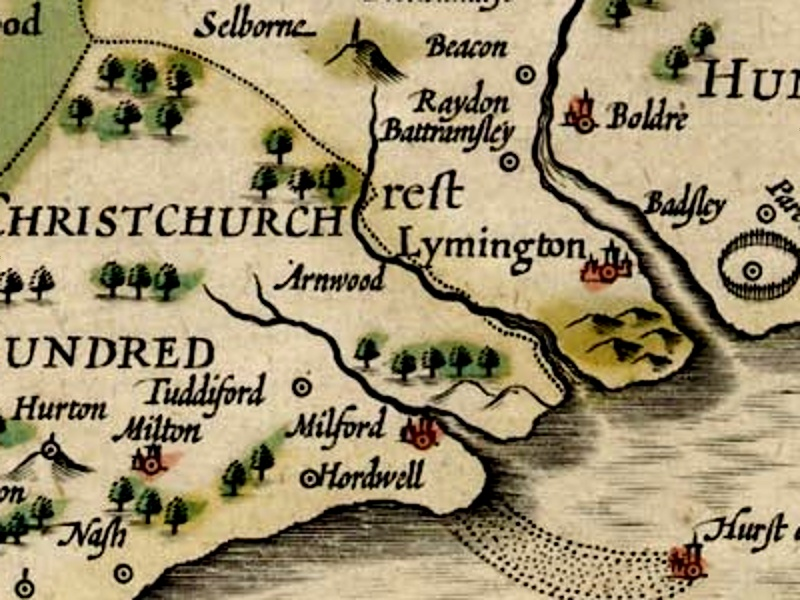
Arnwood and Lymington on John Speed's 1611 map of Hampshire

The Children of the New Forest was written during Marryat's years of retirement in Norfolk, and it was his last novel published during his lifetime. Marryat would sometimes travel to Hampshire to stay at his brother George's country house, Chewton Glen (now a five star hotel), on the edge of the New Forest. It was here that he gathered material for his novel, which is set in and around the real-life manor of Arnewood (spelled without the "e" in Marryat's novel), just south of the village of Sway. Three miles east of Arnewood is the coastal town of Lymington which also features in Marryat's novel.

The book was first published in the "Juvenile Library" in two volumes by H. Hurst, London, in 1847.

== Themes ==
The story is centred on the four Beverley children who learn to survive on their own in the forest, and is particularly focused on the maturing of Edward Beverley as the rather rash, eldest teenager. It celebrates the ideals of chivalry and bravery, tempered by modesty. The four children in the novel eventually become ideal models of manhood and womanhood, and even the gypsy boy Pablo is tamed into their civilising ways. The appearance of Pablo in the novel reflects the fact that Romani people were a common sight in the New Forest in the 19th century, and the association of gypsies with the New Forest was familiar in the Victorian imagination.

Marryat had rather conservative political opinions, and his story favours the Royalist cause, following the fortunes of the children of a Royalist officer. One of the story's major characters, however, is a sympathetically portrayed Roundhead named Heatherstone, the Intendant given the task of managing the Forest lands. Marryat had been wounded several times in his naval career; he understood the nature of war and makes clear his hostility to extremists on both sides. He suggests that good governance lies somewhere between King Charles's insistence on the divine right of kings and Parliament's unjustifiable execution of him. The homecoming and reconciliation at the end of the story are deliberately associated with the restoration of the monarchy. This message about reconciliation in 17th-century England reflects the fact that he wrote the novel during the political chaos of the 1840s when the Chartists were urging political reform in Britain, and shortly before the Revolutions of 1848 erupted across Europe.

== Legacy ==
The Children of the New Forest was one of the first historical novels written for a young audience, and the first such novel which has endured. It was particularly successful in fixing the image of the English Civil War as a quarrel of opposites, with dour Roundheads versus swashbuckling Cavaliers.

== Adaptations ==
=== Comics ===
An adaptation of the book appeared in Thriller Picture Library No. 38.

=== Television ===
The BBC has adapted the novel four times for television. These series were first shown in 1955 (5 episodes), 1964 (6 episodes), 1977 (5 episodes), and 1998 (6 episodes).

The 1998 series departed from original plot. Craig Kelly starred as the villainous preacher Reverend Abel Corbould who was obsessed with capturing and executing the Beverley family. He also pursued a romantic relationship with Heatherstone's daughter Patience, but to no avail. Edward Beverley and Corbould had a final confrontation at a watermill in the forest, which ended with Edward pushing Corbould over the side of the wooden railings and onto the water wheel, dragging the evil preacher down and under the water, drowning him.
