= Frederick Marryat =

Royal Naval officer and novelist (1792–1848)

Captain Frederick Marryat CB FRS
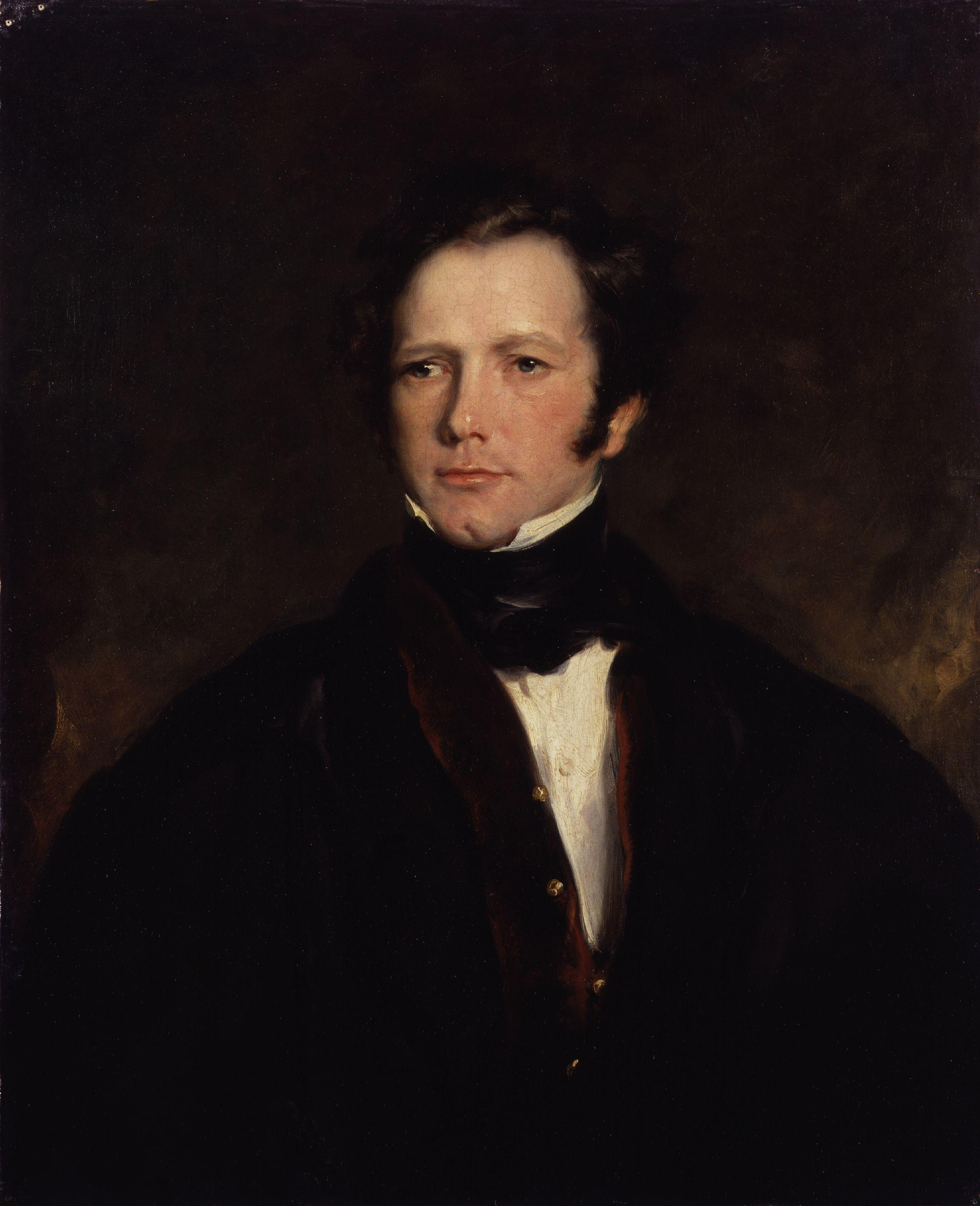
- Portrait by John Simpson, 1826
- Born: 10 July 1792; Westminster, London, UK
- Died: 9 August 1848 (aged 56); Langham, Norfolk, UK
- Occupations: Royal Navy officer, writer, novelist
- Writing career
- Period: 19th century
- Genres: Sea stories and children's literature

Captain Frederick Marryat (10 July 1792 – 9 August 1848) was a Royal Navy officer and novelist. He is noted today as an early pioneer of nautical fiction, particularly for his semi-autobiographical novel Mr Midshipman Easy (1836). He is remembered also for his children's novel The Children of the New Forest (1847). In addition, he developed a widely used system of maritime flag signalling, known as Marryat's Code.

== Early life and naval career ==
Marryat was born at Great George Street in Westminster, London. His father was Joseph Marryat, a "merchant prince" of Huguenot descent and member of Parliament, as well as slave owner and anti-abolitionist, and his American mother was Charlotte, née von Geyer, of Boston. As a youth, Marryat tried to run away to sea several times before he was permitted to enter the Royal Navy in 1806 as a midshipman aboard HMS Imperieuse, a frigate commanded by Lord Cochrane, who later served as inspiration for Marryat and other authors.

Marryat's time aboard the Imperieuse included action off the Gironde, the rescue of a fellow midshipman who had fallen overboard, captures of many ships off the Mediterranean coast of Spain, and capture of the castle of Montgat. The Imperieuse shifted to operations in the Scheldt in 1809, where Marryat contracted malaria; he returned to England on the 74-gun HMS Victorious. After recuperating, he returned to the Mediterranean in the 74-gun HMS Centaur and again saved a shipmate by leaping into the sea after him. He sailed as a passenger to Bermuda in the 64-gun HMS Atlas, and from there to Halifax, Nova Scotia on the schooner HMS Chubb, where he joined the 32-gun frigate HMS Aeolus on 27 April 1811.

A few months later, Marryat earned distinction again by leading the effort to cut away the Aeolus's mainyard to save the ship during a storm. He saved one of the crew from the sea. Shortly after, he moved to the frigate HMS Spartan, participating in the capture of a number of American ships during the War of 1812. On 26 December 1812, he was promoted to lieutenant, and as such served in the sloop HMS Espiegle and in HMS Newcastle. Marryat led four barges from the Newcastle on a raid against Orleans, Massachusetts on 19 December 1814, the last combat in New England during the war. Though initially, Marryat cut out an American schooner and three sloops, he managed to escape with just one sloop. The local militia avoided casualties while killing one Royal marine. Marryat was promoted to commander on 13 June 1815, just as the war ended.

=== After the war ===
Marryat turned to scientific studies after the war. He invented a lifeboat, which earned him a gold medal from the Royal Humane Society and the nickname "Lifeboat". He developed a practical, widely used system of maritime flag signalling, known as Marryat's Code, based on his experience in the Napoleonic Wars escorting merchant ships in convoys. He also described a new gastropod genus Cyclostrema with the type species Cyclostrema cancellatum.

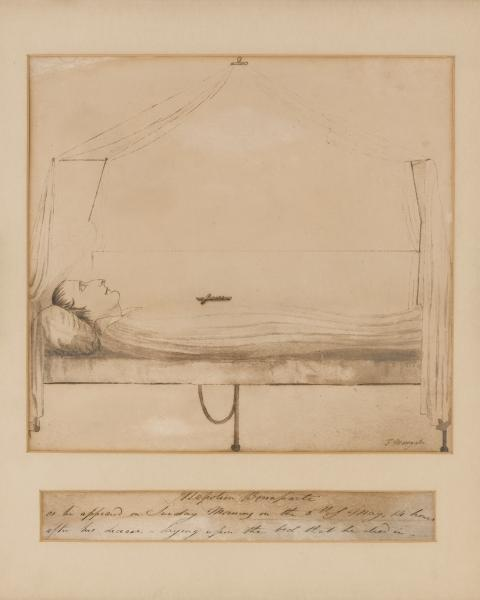
Frederick Marryat's sketch of Napoleon's body on his deathbed

In 1820, Marryat commanded the sloop HMS Beaver and temporarily commanded HMS Rosario in order to carry despatches to England announcing the death of Napoleon on Saint Helena. He also took the opportunity to make a sketch of Napoleon's body on his deathbed; this was later published as a lithograph. His artistic skills were modest, but he made numerous sketches of shipboard life above and below deck.

In 1823, Marryat was appointed to HMS Larne and took part in an expedition against Burma in 1824, which resulted in large losses from disease. He was promoted to command the 28-gun HMS Tees, which gave him the rank of post-captain. By 1826 he was back in England and that year donated two Burmese artifacts to the British Museum, in an unsuccessful effort to be selected as a trustee. In 1829, he was commanding the frigate HMS Ariadne on a search for shoals around the Madeira and Canary Islands. This was an uninspiring exercise. As his first novel The Naval Officer had just been published, he decided to resign his commission in November 1830 and take up writing full-time.

== Literary career ==
From 1832 to 1835, Marryat edited The Metropolitan Magazine. Additionally, he kept writing novels; his biggest success came with Mr Midshipman Easy in 1836. He lived in Brussels for a year, travelled in Canada and the United States, and moved to London in 1839, where he was in the literary circle of Charles Dickens and others. He was in North America in 1837 when rebellion broke out in Lower Canada, and served with the expeditionary force sent to suppress it.

Marryat was named a Fellow of the Royal Society in recognition of his lifeboat, signals system and other achievements. In 1843, he moved to a farm at Manor Cottage, Langham in Norfolk. He died there in 1848. His daughter Florence Marryat later became known as a writer and actress. His son Francis Samuel Marryat completed his father's last novel, The Little Savage.

Marryat's novels are typical of their time, with concerns of family connections and social status often overshadowing the naval action. He based much of his fiction on his 25 years' experience at sea. Among those who admired his works were Mark Twain, Joseph Conrad, and Ernest Hemingway. As the first nautical novels, they served as models for 20th century works by C. S. Forester and Patrick O'Brian. These also were set in the time of Nelson and told of young men rising through the ranks due to their successes as naval officers.

Marryat was also known for short writings on nautical subjects. These short stories, plays, pieces of travel journalism, and essays were published in The Metropolitan Magazine, and many were later collected in book form as Olla Podrida.

Marryat's 1839 Gothic novel The Phantom Ship contained "The White Wolf of the Hartz Mountains". This featured the first female werewolf to appear in a short story.

In 1839, Marryat also published his Diary in America, a travelogue that reflects his criticisms of American culture and society. The book and the author were both subject to acts of violence. The book and Marryat's effigy were each burned in public.

Controversy arose among Marryat's readers. Some criticized him for careless writing, others admired his vivacity about life at sea. His later novels were generally for the children's market, including his most famous novel today: The Children of the New Forest, published in 1847 and set in the countryside round the village of Sway, Hampshire.

The works of Marryat are considered by the maritime historians of today to be a reliable source on the operation and characteristics of the sailing vessels of his time.

== Marriage and family ==
On 21 January 1819, Marryat married Catherine Shairp. They had four sons and seven daughters together, of whom eight survived infancy. These included Florence, a prolific novelist; Emilia, who became a writer of moralist adventure novels in her father's vein and wrote a biography of him; Augusta, who also wrote adventure fiction; and Frank, a naval officer and author.

Marryat's niece Augusta Sophia Marryat married Henry Young, who served as Governor of South Australia and Tasmania. A suburb of Adelaide, called Marryatville, and the town of Port Augusta were named after her. Augusta's brother Charles Marryat was the first Anglican Dean of Adelaide.

== Works ==
- The Naval Officer, or Scenes in the Life and Adventures of Frank Mildmay (1829)
- The King's Own (1830)
- Newton Forster or, the Merchant Service (1832)
- Peter Simple (1834)
- Jacob Faithful (Book Six of the Marryat Cycle, 1834)
- The Pacha of Many Tales (1835)
- Mr Midshipman Easy (1836)
- Japhet, in Search of a Father (1836)
- The Pirate (1836)
- The Three Cutters (1836)
- Snarleyyow, or the Dog Fiend (1837)
- Rattlin the Reefer (with Edward Howard, 1838)
- The Phantom Ship (1839)
- Diary in America (1839)
- Olla Podrida (1840)
- Poor Jack (1840)
- Masterman Ready, or the Wreck of the Pacific (1841)
- Joseph Rushbrook, or the Poacher (1841)
- Percival Keene (1842)
- Monsieur Violet (1843)
- The Settlers in Canada (1844)
- The Mission, or Scenes in Africa (1845)
- The Privateer's Man, or One Hundred Years Ago (1846)
- The Children of the New Forest (1847)
- The Little Savage (posthumous, 1848, completed by Robert Folkestone Williams)
- Valerie (posthumous, 1848)
