= Peter Simple (novel) =

1834 book by Frederick Marryat

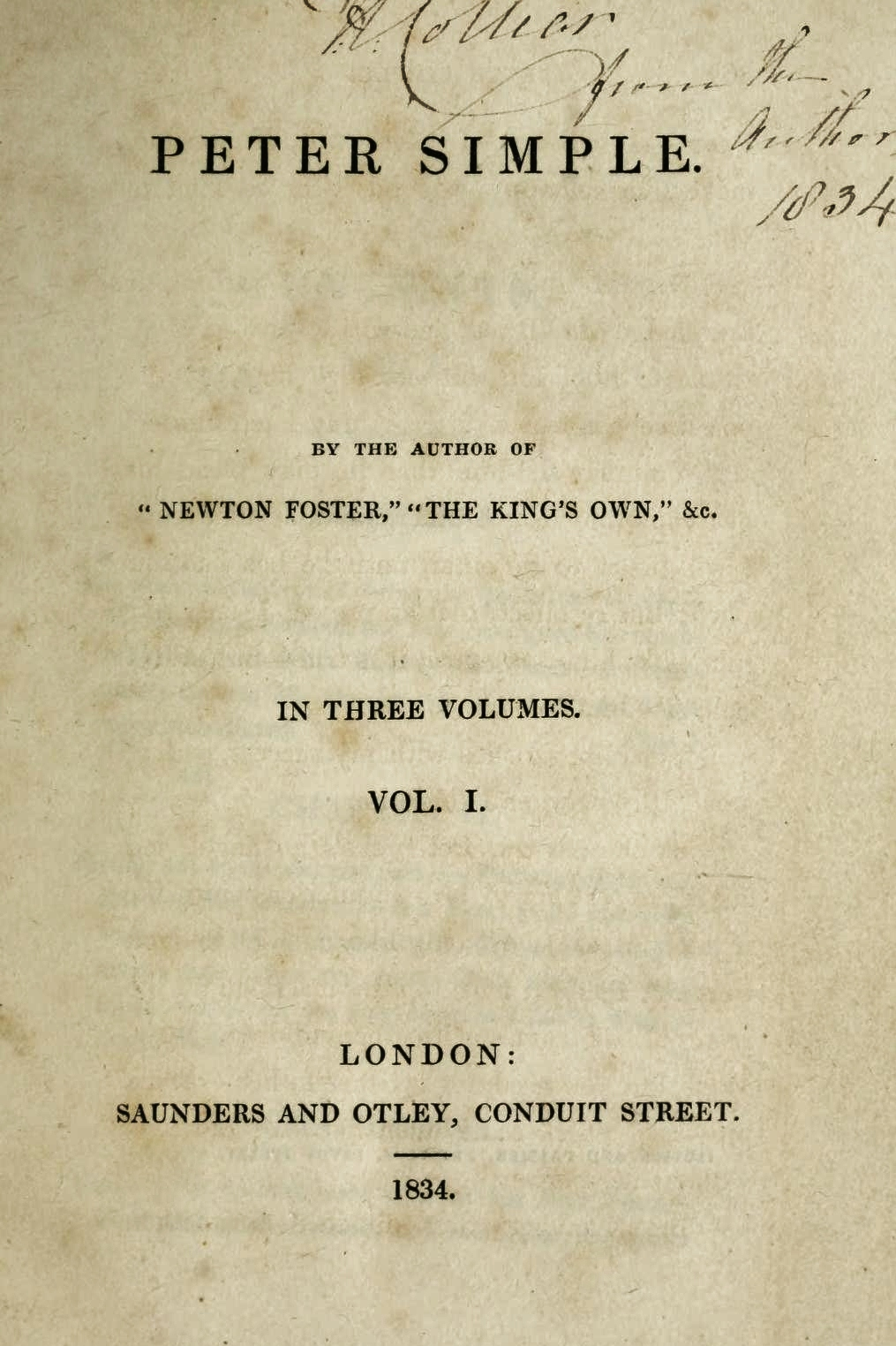
- First edition title page with hand written dedication from the author
- Author: Frederick Marryat
- Language: English
- Publication date: 1834

Peter Simple is an 1834 novel written by Frederick Marryat about a young British midshipman during the Napoleonic Wars. It was originally published in serialized form in The Metropolitan Magazine in 1832-33, during Marryat's editorship. It is the longest of Marryat's novels and during his lifetime was the most celebrated.

== Plot summary ==
The novel describes the naval career of a young gentleman during the period of British mastery of the seas in the early 19th century. The hero of the title is introduced as 'the fool of the family', son of a parson and heir presumptive to the influential Lord Privilege. This forms a subplot among several others that run alongside the main narrative which mainly concerns the young man's journey from adolescent to adulthood amidst a backdrop of war at sea.

One of the key components of the tale is Peter's relationship with the various shipmates he meets, mainly an older officer who takes young Simple under his wing and proves invaluable in his sea education, and also a post captain who has Münchausen syndrome, among others.

== Adaptation ==
In 1957 the novel was adapted into a BBC television series The Adventures of Peter Simple starring Timothy Bateson.
