= Gary and Joanie McGuffin =

Canadian explorers

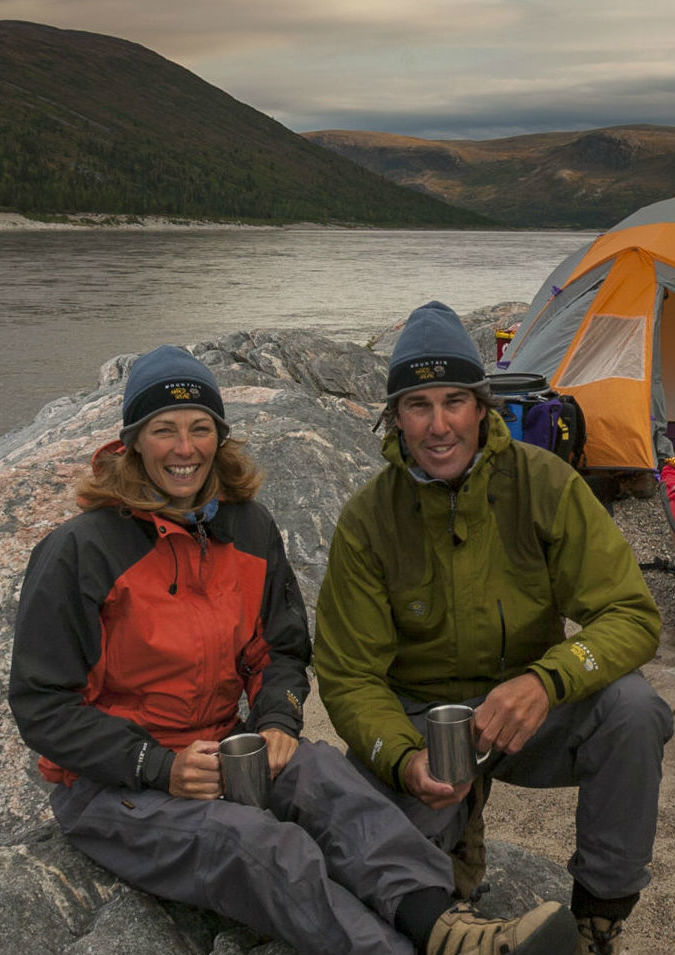
- Born: 1959, 1960; London and Thornhill, Ontario
- Education: Seneca College
- Occupations: Explorers, Conservation Photographers, Authors, Public Speakers
- Years active: 1983–Present
- Website: https://www.themcguffins.ca

Gary and Joanie McGuffin are Canadian explorers, conservation photographers, writers, motivational speakers, documentarians and conservationists. Their most documented adventures have been about canoeing on waterways throughout North America, bicycling from the Arctic to the Pacific to the Atlantic oceans, backpacking the entire length of the Appalachian Trail, circumnavigating Lake Superior by canoe and paddling across Northern Ontario in the footsteps of Grey Owl. The McGuffins are noted primarily for their popular paddle sports instructional books on canoeing and kayaking, and their documentary film based on their research about the Group of Seven artists. Between adventures, the McGuffins are ambassadors of the wilderness, touring the world through speaking events, photo exhibitions, book tours, eco-tourism development, and educational seminars on conservation. In 2000, the Ontario government officially appointed Gary and Joanie as Champions of the Coast under the Great Lakes Heritage Coast program. In 2003, they were the recipients of the Premier's Award and the Queen's Golden Jubilee Medal for wilderness preservation and environmental education achievements for their province and their country.

== Education ==
Gary McGuffin and Joan Wood met and fell in love at Seneca College in 1979. They were enrolled in a two-year Outdoor Recreation Technology program and graduated with honours. Their college education propelled them into their career through skill sets such as wilderness expeditions, writing, outdoor clothing and equipment design. In 2003, Seneca College presented each of them with a Distinguished Alumni Award in the category of Applied Arts. The award honours outstanding Ontario college graduates. Joanie and Gary McGuffin are the first husband-and-wife recipients.

== Career ==
=== Wilderness expeditions ===
==== Appalachian Trail ====
In 1981, the McGuffins completed their first long-distance journey together. They spent four and a half months backpacking the 2100 mile Appalachian Trail through 14 states from Georgia to Maine. Gary photographed their journey with a Pentax K1000 35mm camera and a 50mm lens. The only other photographic equipment he carried consisted of a tiny tripod which could be screwed, clamped or balanced on a variety of surfaces. With only seven rolls of 36-exposure Kodak slide film, Gary could only average 2 photographs a day to document the expedition. Using a system of small town post offices, they received new supplies and sent their photographs and writing journals back home. The long-distance journey confirmed their personal commitment to a life of exploration and adventure. The success of completing the Appalachian Trail led them dream bigger dreams together.

==== Canoeing across Canada ====
Shortly after getting married in April 1983, the McGuffins went on the world's longest honeymoon: a two-year canoe trip across Canada from the Gulf of St. Lawrence to the Arctic Ocean. Preparations for this journey were extensive. They spent hours researching the route on maps and reading through historical journals. They sought out sponsors such as their major underwriter Labatt Breweries, and acquired equipment and clothing that would be tested along the journey. Thanks to both corporate and media support, this journey was well publicized. The McGuffins wrote regular articles for The Toronto Star, The London Free Press and the Bracebridge Herald Gazette, and they did a weekly radio broadcast series with CBC Ontario Morning for 40 weeks, and broadcasts with each provincial CBC radio network as they paddled through each province during the journey. Upon returning from the wilderness, they were inundated with requests to give presentations, talks and interviews about their trip, including one from Peter Gzowski, a well-known Canadian broadcaster and writer. In 1988, they published their first book, Where Rivers Run, which chronicled this voyage. The hardcover version was also published by Hodder and Stoughton in the UK under the title Canoeing Across Canada. Their Canadian publisher Jack Stoddart sent the McGuffins on a six-week, 25-city Canadian book promotion tour. In 1990, Be-Pal Magazine, a popular outdoor publication in Japan with a readership of 500,000 ran a 6-part series excerpted from Where Rivers Run. This book created the credibility needed to launch their career.

==== Cycling across Canada ====
In 1986, McGuffins continued their self-propelled exploration of Canada when they embarked on a 7,500 mile (12,000 km) bicycling journey from Tuktoyaktuk in the Northwest Territories to L'Anse aux Meadows in Newfoundland. They began their cycling journey on April 1 on the Ice Road that links Tuktoyuktuk on the Arctic Coast with Inuvik at the northern end of the Dempster Highway thereby making a physical link with their previous canoe voyage. The journey took five months. The route was mapped out to link the three oceans from the Arctic to the Pacific to the Atlantic, to include the Northwest Territories, Yukon Territory and all ten provinces from British Columbia to Newfoundland and, for the most part, the route was on the most northerly roads they could find. Challenges faced included frostbite in the -40-degree weather on the Ice Road, avoiding grizzly bear encounters on the Dempster, enduring severe knee pain on 1500 miles of bone-jarring, unpaved roads, sheltering from hail storms on the prairies, having close encounters with log hauling trucks in British Columbia and northern Ontario, and surviving frigid late autumn weather in Newfoundland off the Strait of Belle Isle.

==== Lake Superior ====
In September 1989, the McGuffins completed a 3-month circumnavigation of Lake Superior’s rugged wilderness shoreline in solo sea canoes. Lake Superior is the greatest freshwater expanse in the world. It is renowned by mariners for its late autumn storms that can create seas more challenging than the open ocean as immortalized in Gordon Lightfoot’s song The Wreck of the Edmund Fitzgerald. In the book, Superior: Journeys On An Inland Sea, Joanie describes their voyage around Superior while Gary’s photography illustrating the book throughout is a compilation of images from the McGuffins four seasons of exploration from the shoreline to the rivers to the ancient mountains.

==== In the footsteps of Grey Owl ====
In February 1997, the Province of Ontario was embarked on a comprehensive land use planning process called Lands for Life which would determine the future use of almost half of Ontario’s landscape. Lands For Life was going to determine the fate of Ontario’s old growth forests, wetlands, wildlife, and resource use over the long term. Industrial activities of logging, mining and hydroelectric development were being favoured on over 90% of this land so the Federation of Ontario Naturalists, World Wildlife Fund Canada, and the Wildlands League formed the Partnership for Public Lands to speak with one voice for protecting natural heritage areas. While public roundtable debates were taking place across the province with the input from corporations, interest groups, and the public, Gary and Joanie McGuffin decided to make their own contribution by embarking on a canoe journey into the heart of this ancient forest country. They aimed to show that the ancient forests and pristine waterways of the region constitute a magnificent natural heritage corridor that should be preserved. The McGuffins three-month-long, 1,200 mile canoe trip route from Algonquin Park to Lake Superior was based in part on the work of Dr. Peter Quinby and the Ancient Forest Exploration & Research Organization. The route linked key parks, major rivers and connected many of the remaining ancient forests to demonstrate the ecological and recreational values. This route also followed the same rivers and lakes travelled and written about by the most famous conservationist of the 1930s—an Englishman, Archie Belaney, who lived in a reimagined life as an Indian named Grey Owl. Before setting off on the journey, the McGuffins garnered the support of MSAT, Apple, Canon, Kodak and Nissan to enable unique virtual participation from the wilderness. While most corporations had not yet even built their first website, the McGuffins launched www.the adventurers.org to enable daily website updates, a weekly colour feature with Southam News through the Sault Star, weekly broadcasts with CBC Radio and a television series with Baton Broadcasting. They captured the journey through a digital camera and a laptop computer which was extremely rare in photojournalism and very forward thinking during the late 1990s. The journey created a much greater public awareness, involvement and debate over conservation policy in Ontario during that time. In 2002 McClelland & Stewart published the McGuffins 4th book, In the Footsteps of Grey Owl, Journey into the Ancient Forest. The photographic book includes the story of their journey and excerpts from Grey Owl’s books. Monte Hummel, WWF Canada President wrote in the Forward "In the end Lands for Life produced a "Living Legacy" of 378 new or expanded parks …. This was by far the most important single decision to protect nature ever taken in Ontario and the McGuffins were a big part of the team that made it possible."

==== Great Lakes heritage coast ====
Another outcome of Lands For Life was an innovative comprehensive land use approach based on the beautiful Great Lakes shoreline submitted by Sault Ste Marie’s Ministry of Natural Resources Shorelines Technician Peter Burtch. It was called Great Lakes Heritage Coast. This was accepted as one of the nine Signature Sites under Ontario’s Living Legacy. In 2000, the Ontario Government made Gary and Joanie McGuffin Official Champions of the Coast. To support the protection and restoration of the ecosystem of the Great Lakes Coast, which was the government’s number one priority under this Heritage Coast initiative, the McGuffins planned a journey to paddle the route from the Minnesota-Ontario border on Lake Superior to Severn Sound on Georgian Bay. In the summer of 2002, for three months, they paddled over 1,200 miles (1,800 kilometres), with their three-year-old daughter, Sila, and their Alaskan malamute, Kalija, from the Pigeon River near Thunder Bay to Port Severn on Georgian Bay. They carried the communications equipment necessary to share the adventure through weekly radio broadcasts, newspaper stories, and a website. The book, Great Lakes Journey: Exploring the Heritage Coast, documenting these travels was published in 2003.

==== Quetico ====
In 2009, the McGuffins published Quetico: Into The Wild with Chrismar Publications to celebrate the Centennial anniversary of Ontario’s second oldest provincial park. This photographic book recounts four seasons of explorations throughout the park and is a celebration of journey documenting all four seasons of Quetico's waterways, trails and backcountry.

==== Other expeditions ====
The McGuffins have documented and published other expeditions. Kayaking the Baja’s Wild Coastline, an article published in Explore Magazine, recounts their 3-month journey exploring the desert, mountains, seashores, wildlife and the local culture of Baja Mexico. Reader’s Digest published Landscape of My Dreams that chronicled their backpacking and kayaking experiences in the Greenland Fjords. The trek Climbing Chimborazo was printed in Doctor’s Review describing a journey to the Ecuadorian Andes.

=== Conservation ===
==== Lake Superior Watershed Conservancy ====
Gary and Joanie McGuffin with Ruth O’Gawa are the founders of the Lake Superior Watershed Conservancy(LSWC). LSWC is dedicated to the long-term sustainable health of the Lake Superior watershed. The organization's members include the David Suzuki Foundation, Ducks Unlimited, Science North, the City of Sault Ste. Marie, artist Ken Danby and the Thunder Bay Field Naturalists. LSWC's land acquisitions in Northern Ontario to protect wilderness areas for the future generations include preserves located in Prince Township, on Goulais Bay, and off the coast of Cape Gargantua, Lake Superior Provincial Park.

==== Group of Seven heritage landscapes ====
Since 2008, the McGuffins and art historian Michael Burtch have been exploring the landscapes of the formative years of the Group of Seven. They have travelled on foot and by canoe into Algonquin, Georgian Bay, Algoma and the Lake Superior North Shore seeking the exact sites immortalized in their paintings made a century ago. This ongoing cultural anthropology research locates, identifies, and documents these painting sites and the landscapes inspired from them. They co-produced an award-winning documentary film Painted Land: In Search of the Group of Seven, with White Pine Pictures. The film time travels between the past (historical footage of the Group of Seven and re-created scenes) and the present as the McGuffins and Burtch take us on adventures to find these painting that inspired The Group of Seven.

==== Miichipicoten Bay trap rock quarry ====
The McGuffins, as Champions of the Heritage Coast, were against the development of the trap rock quarry and blasting operations that was developed on the Michipicoten Bay shore. A letter, sent in January 2004, requested a full Environmental Assessment to avoid the deterioration of the Great Lakes Heritage Coast and was supported by other champions such as Pierre Berton, Roberta Bondar, Ken Danby, Tony Esposito, Phil Esposito, Bobby Orr, Ted Nolan, and much more. The government reviewed the assessment and declined to overturn the development of this property in 2009.

==== Gargantua Islands ====
In April 2013, the McGuffins and the Lake Superior Watershed Conservancy (LSWC) helped create a permanent conservation to keep the Gargantua Islands from being sold to private owners. In partnership with American Friends of Canadian Land Trusts, the Gargantua 20-islands Preserve off the coast of Lake Superior Provincial Park remain an integral part of a pristine, undeveloped coastline.

==== Lake Superior Water Trail ====
In the fall of 1989, the McGuffins were involved in the first steps to establish a basin-wide Lake Superior Water Trail. In 2013, the McGuffins mapped the 1,000 km Trans Canada Lake Superior Water Trail between Thunder Bay’s Fisherman’s Park and Whitefish Bay’s Gros Cap Harbour. The Lake Superior Watershed Conservancy [LSWC] is the registrant and overseer of this section of trail. The Conservancy is also working towards completion of an international connected route around Superior by 2017 for the benefit of the entire lake and its people.

== Works by Gary and Joanie McGuffin ==
=== Books ===
- Where Rivers Run: A 6,000-mile Exploration of Canada by Canoe, 1988. ISBN 1-55046-314-4
- Canoeing Across Canada, 1988. ISBN 0-906371-23-6
- Superior: Journeys on an Inland Sea, 1995 (reprinted in 2000). A Great Lakes Booksellers Award winner. ISBN 1-55046-067-6
- Paddle Your Own Canoe: An Illustrated Guide to the Art of Canoeing, 1999 (reprinted in 2005). ISBN 1-55046-377-2
- In the Footsteps of Grey Owl: Journey into the Ancient Forest, 2002. ISBN 0-7710-5537-4
- Great Lakes Journey: Exploring the Heritage Coast, 2003. ISBN 0-7710-5539-0
- Wilderness Ontario, 2007. ISBN 978-1-55046-504-4
- Paddle Your Own Kayak: An Illustrated Guide to the Art of Kayaking, 2008. ISBN 1-55046-464-7
- Quetico: Into The Wild, 2009. ISBN 0-929140-99-0

=== Films ===
- Painted Land: In Search of the Group of Seven, White Pine Pictures, 2015.

=== Art exhibitions ===
- 2009 Photographic Wave Wall Exhibition Exploring Ontario International Centre, Toronto; Quiet Water Symposium, Michigan State University, Lansing MI; Canoecopia, Dane County Exhibition Center, Madison WI
- 2008 Wilderness River Expedition Art Foundation Visions of the Boreal Forest: Artists Deep in the Northern Wilderness, Wilderness Experience Gallery, Parker Colorado
- 2008 Photographic Wave Wall presentation with Ontario Tourism and Ontario Parks Toronto, Lansing and Madison
- 2007 Wilderness River Expedition Art Foundation’s Visions of the Boreal Forest: Artists Deep in the Northern Wilderness --- Wildling Art Museum, Los Olivos, CA
- 2007 Photographic Wave Wall Tour with Ontario Tourism/Ontario Parks/Paddling Ontario --- International Centre, Toronto; Quiet Water Symposium, Michigan State University, Lansing MI; Canoecopia, Dane County Exhibition Center, Madison WI; MidWest Mountaineering Show, Minneapolis MN
- 2006 Photographic Wave Wall Discover Northern Ontario International Centre, Toronto; Dane Exhibition Center, Madison WI; Jersey Paddler, Brick, New Jersey
- 2005 Wave Wall Great Lakes Journey, Exploring the Heritage Coast International Centre, Toronto; Michigan State University, Lansing MI; Dane Exhibition Center, Madison WI
- 2000 Journeys on An Inland Sea, Thunder Bay National Exhibition Centre, Thunder Bay, Ontario
- 2000 In the Footsteps of Grey Owl, Thunder Bay National Exhibition Centre, Thunder Bay, Ontario
- 1999 Journeys on An Inland Sea, W.K.P. Kennedy Gallery, North Bay, Ontario
- 1999 Journeys into the Ancient Forest, Blind River Timber Museum, Blind River, Ontario
- 1998 Journeys on An Inland Sea, Art Gallery of Algoma, Sault Ste. Marie, Ontario
- 1998 Journeys into the Ancient Forest, Art Gallery of Algoma, Sault Ste. Marie, Ontario
- 1996 Behold Our Canada, W.K.P. Kennedy Gallery, North Bay, Ontario
- 1993 Behold Our Canada, Virginia McCune Art Gallery, Petoskey, Michigan
- 1992 Behold Our Canada, Art Gallery of Algoma, Sault Ste. Marie, Ontario
- 1991 Behold Our Canada, Wawa Tourism & Interpretive Centre, Wawa, Ontario
- 1990 Behold Our Canada, Thunder Bay National Exhibition Centre, Thunder Bay, Ontario
- 1990 Behold Our Canada, Chapel Art Gallery, Bracebridge, Ontario
- 1989 Behold Our Canada, Chatham Cultural Centre, Chatham, Ontario
- 1989 Behold Our Canada, Barrie Art Gallery, Barrie, Ontario
- 1988 Behold Our Canada, London Regional Art Gallery, London, Ontario
