= Langham, Norfolk =

Village in Norfolk, England

Coordinates: 52.931°N 0.986°E

Langham
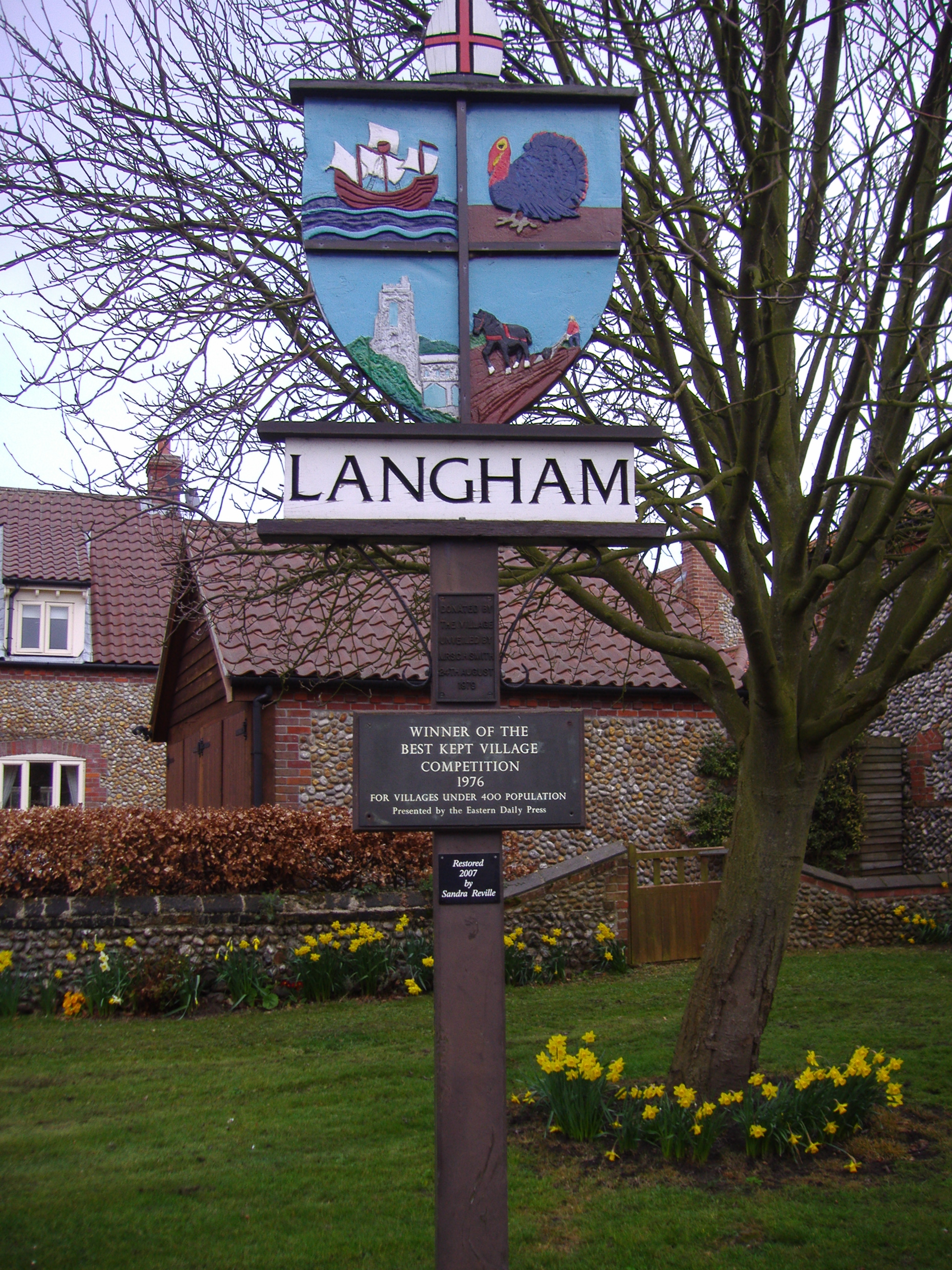
- Langham Village Sign

- Location within Norfolk
- Area: 2.73 sq mi (7.1 km^{2})
- Population: 355 (2021 census)
  - Density: 130/sq mi (50/km^{2})
- OS grid reference: TG000410
  - London: 126 miles (203 km)
- Civil parish: Langham CP
- District: North Norfolk
- Shire county: Norfolk
- Region: East
- Country: England
- Sovereign state: United Kingdom
- Post town: HOLT
- Postcode district: NR25
- Dialling code: 01328
- Police: Norfolk
- Fire: Norfolk
- Ambulance: East of England
- UK Parliament: North Norfolk

Langham is a village and civil parish in the English county of Norfolk.

Langham is located 14.7 miles (23.7 km) west of Cromer and 27.2 miles (43.8 km) northwest of Norwich, along the B1156 road, between Blakeney and Sharrington and within the Norfolk Coast Area of Outstanding Natural Beauty.

== History ==
Langham's name is of Anglo-Saxon origin and derives from the Old English for the long homestead.

In the Domesday Book, Langham is listed as a settlement of 62 households in the hundred of Holt. In 1086, the village was part of the East Anglian estates of William de Beaufeu.

Langham Hall was built in the 18th century in the Greek Revival style for the Reverend Rippinghall who also designed the house. The hall was used as a hospital by the Royal Air Force during the Second World War.

During the Second World War, much of the parish became RAF Langham which was used until 1961 mostly by RAF Coastal Command. Today, a dome used to trained air gunners still stands and is one of the few examples still left in the country.

The former site of the airfield is the site of reputed haunting in which screaming, the sounds of aircraft crashing and ghostly USAAF servicemen have been heard or seen.

== Geography ==
According to the 2021 census, Langham had a population of 355 people, a decrease from the 372 people recorded in the 2011 census.

== Church of St Andrew and St Mary ==
Langham's parish church is jointly dedicated to Saint Andrew and Saint Mary and dates from the fourteenth century. The church is located on Holt Road and has been Grade I listed since 1959. The church no longer holds Sunday service.

St Andrew's and St Mary's features a stained-glass window installed in the 1890s by Sir Edward Burne-Jones and a set of royal arms depicting those of Queen Anne which may be from an earlier reign.

== Notable residents ==
- Captain Frederick Marryat CB (1792-1848) naval officer and novelist, died & buried in Langham
- Stephen Rippingall (1825-1856) rower and cricketer, lived in Langham.

== Governance ==
Langham is part of the electoral ward of Priory for local elections and is part of the district of North Norfolk.

The village's national constituency is North Norfolk, which has been represented by the Liberal Democrat Steff Aquarone MP since 2024.

== Historic Gallery ==
Street view of Langham circa 1915.

Langham Church circa 1915.
