= Harold Dingwall Bateson =

English rugby union player

Harold Dingwall Bateson (2 May 1855 – 29 October 1927) was an English rugby union international player.

== Personal history ==
Bateson was born in Liverpool, Lancashire. He was the son of William Gandy Bateson and Agnes Dingwall Bateson (née Blaikie). He was the older brother of Sir Alexander Dingwall Bateson. Bateson entered Rugby School on 2 May 1869.

Bateson was married to Susan Clara Lemonius on 19 October 1881, at All Hallows Church. Susan's brother, Gerard MacLean Lemonius C.B.E. was also another Old Rugbeian who went on to play for Clifton R.F.C.

== Oxford University ==
Bateson entered Trinity College, Oxford 19 October 1874 aged 19, and was awarded B.A. of the Inner Temple, 12 December 1877.

Harold became Captain of Oxford University Rugby Football Club following the tradition at the time which meant that the Captain, Secretary and one of the committeemen must always be Rugbeian.

== Club Rugby ==
Bateson played club rugby for Liverpool F.C.& Blackheath F.C. He was a capped international with England when he played in a friendly against Ireland in 1879. He died on 29 October 1927 aged 72.

== England Cap ==
Harold received his one and only England Cap as a forward against Ireland on 24 March 1879. The match was played at the Oval in Kennington and England won 3 goals to nil.
