= Florence Marryat =

British author and actress (1833–1899)

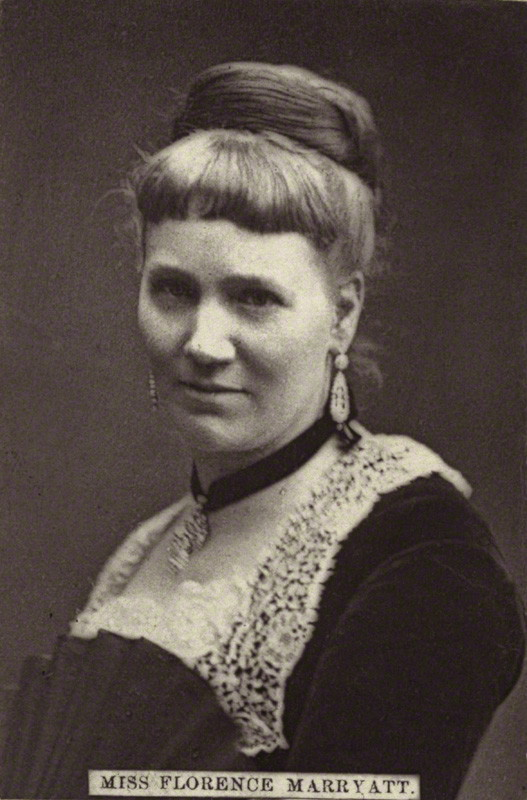
Marryat in the late 1860s–1870s

Florence Marryat (9 July 1833 – 27 October 1899) was an English author and actress. The daughter of author Capt. Frederick Marryat, she was particularly known for her sensation novels and her involvement with several celebrated spiritual mediums of the late 19th century. Her works include Love’s Conflict (1865), Her Father's Name (1876), There is No Death (1891), The Spirit World (1894), The Dead Man's Message (1894) and The Blood of the Vampire (1897). She was a prolific author, writing around 70 books, as well as newspaper and magazine articles, short stories and works for the stage.

From 1876 to 1890, she had a performing career, at first writing and performing a comic touring piano sketch entertainment, together with George Grossmith, and later performing in dramas, comedies, comic opera with a D'Oyly Carte Opera Company, her own one-woman show, and appearing as a lecturer, dramatic reader and public entertainer. During the 1890s, she ran a school of Journalism and Literary Art.

== Early life ==
Marryat was born in Brighton, Sussex, in 1833, daughter of author and naval Captain Frederick Marryat and his wife, Catherine (née Shairp). Her parents separated when Marryat was young; her childhood was divided between her parents' residences, where she was privately educated.

Shortly before her 21st birthday, in 1854, she wed Thomas Ross Church, an officer in the Madras staff corps of the British Army in India; they spent the first seven years of their married life travelling extensively in India before she returned to England in 1860 with her children but without her husband, who apparently visited only occasionally. She had eight children with Church, three of them while in India.

== Career ==
Marryat wrote her first novel, Love’s Conflict (1865), while her young children were suffering from scarlet fever, to distract herself from "sad thoughts". The novel met with modest success and was followed by Too Good for Him and Woman Against Woman in the same year. Other early works included The Confessions of Gerald Escourt (1867), Nelly Brooke (1868), Veronique (1868) and The Girls of Feversham (1869), mining the British public's taste for sensational fiction: "lurid stories of seduction, murder, insanity, extramarital sex, incest, and the exploits of the demi-monde". Marryat continued to write novels for 35 years. In 1872, she wrote a biography of her father, Life and Letters of Captain Marryat. From 1872 to 1876, in addition to writing for newspapers and magazines, she edited the monthly magazine London Society.

By the mid-1870s Marryat was an internationally successful author and was living together with her future husband, Colonel Francis Lean of the Royal Marine Light Infantry. Church eventually sued for divorce in 1878, citing his wife's adultery as the grounds. From 1876 to 1877, she collaborated with George Grossmith, writing and performing a comic touring entertainment called Entre Nous ("Between you and me"). This piece consisted of a series of piano sketches, alternating with scenes and costumed recitations, including a two-person "satirical musical sketch", really a short comic opera, by Grossmith called Cups and Saucers. Marryat and her husband divorced in 1879; later that year, she wed Colonel Lean, but they divorced only a year later, in 1880.

At the age of 48, in 1881, Marryat returned to the stage, playing the role of Hephzibah Horton in a drama she wrote based on her novel Her World Against a Lie. The next year, she joined a D'Oyly Carte Opera Company touring company in Gilbert and Sullivan's Patience, playing the role of Lady Jane. In 1884 she played Queen Altemire in a revival of W. S. Gilbert's fairy comedy The Palace of Truth in London with Herbert Beerbohm Tree. In 1886, Marryat wrote a lighthearted book about her travels in the United States called Tom Tiddler's Ground. She later appeared in her own one-woman show, Love Letters, and appeared as a lecturer, dramatic reader and public entertainer. She continued performing until 1890, when she played Cassandra Doolittle in an operetta called The Dear Departed.

== Last years and death ==
Marryat became active in the Society of Authors, founded in 1884, and also began to breed bulldogs and terriers. Over the last 14 years of her life, she had a relationship with a younger actor, Herbert McPherson, who inherited half of her estate. During the 1890s, she ran a school of Journalism and Literary Art. She continued writing for the rest of her life, and some of her best known books were her late-career writings on spiritualism, and included There Is No Death (1891), The Spirit World (1894) and A Soul on Fire. She influenced wiccan Gerald Gardner in his youth.

Marryat died in 1899 from diabetes and pneumonia and is buried in Kensal Green Cemetery in London.

== Works and reaction ==
Marryat published 68 novels before her death, as well as various non-fiction works such as The Life and Letters of Captain Marryat (1872) and Gup (1868), an account of garrison life in India. She also wrote newspaper and magazine articles, short stories and works for the stage. Her works treated such then-controversial themes as marital cruelty, adultery, alcoholism and spiritualism. There is No Death and The Spirit World give accounts of séances she attended.

The public found Marryat's work accessible, and reviewers admitted the effectiveness of her "graphic, nervous, vital" style, but critics called her "cynical and 'third-rate', too dependent for her plots on 'the stock in trade of fourth-rate solicitors'". Despite critical hostility, her novels remained popular.

=== Novels ===
- Love’s Conflict (1865)
- Too Good for Him (1865)
- Woman Against Woman (1865)
- For Ever and Ever (1866)
- The Confessions of Gerald Estcourt (1867)
- Nelly Brooke – A Homely Story (1868)
- The Girls of Feversham (1869)
- Veronique (1869)
- Petronel (1870)
- Her Lord and Master (1871)
- The Prey of the Gods (1871)
- Mad Dumaresq (1873)
- No Intentions (1874)
- Fighting the Air (1875)
- Open! Sesame! (1875)
- Her Father’s Name (1876)
- My Own Child (1876)
- A Harvest of Wild Oats (1877)
- A Little Stepson (1878)
- Her World Against a Lie (1878)
- Written in Fire (1878)
- A Broken Blossom (1879)
- The Root of All Evil (1879)
- Out of His Reckoning (1879)
- The Fair-Haired Alda (1880)
- My Sister the Actress (1881)
- With Cupid’s Eye (1881)
- Facing the Footlights (1882)
- How They Loved Him (1882)
- Phyllida (1882)
- Peeress and Player (1883)
- The Heart of Jane Warner (1884)
- Under the Lillies and Roses (1884)
- The Heir Presumptive (1885)
- Miss Harrington’s Husband (a reissue of The Spiders of Society) (1886)
- The Master Passion (1886)
- The Spiders of Society (1886)
- A Daughter of the Tropics (1887)
- Driven to Bay (1887)
- A Crown of Shame (1888)
- Gentleman and Courtier (1888)
- Mount Eden (1889)
- On Circumstantial Evidence (1889)
- A Scarlet Sin (1890)
- Blindfold (1890)
- Brave Heart and True (1890)
- A Fatal Silence (1891)
- The Risen Dead (1891)
- The Lost Diamonds (with Charles Ogilvie) (1891)
- How Like a Woman (1892)
- The Nobler Sex (1892)
- Parson Jones (1893)
- A Bankrupt Heart (1894)
- The Beautiful Soul (1894)
- The Hampstead Mystery (1894)
- The Dead Man’s Message – An Occult Romance (1894)
- At Heart a Rake (1895)
- The Dream that Stayed (1896)
- The Strange Transfiguration of Hannah Stubbs (1896)
- A Passing Madness (1897)
- In the Name of Liberty (1897)
- The Blood of the Vampire (1897)
- A Soul on Fire (UK edition of The Dead Man’s Message) (1898)
- An Angel of Pity (1898)
- Why Did She Love Him? (1898)
- A Rational Marriage (1899)
- Iris the Avenger (1899)
- The Folly of Alison (1899)

=== Short story collections ===
- Captain Norton’s Diary and other stories (1870)
- A Lucky Disappointment and other stories (1876)
- A Star and a Heart (1876)
- Hidden Chains (1876)
- The Poison of Asps (1876)
- A Moment of Madness and other stories (1883)
- The Ghost of Charlotte Cray and other stories (1883)
- Old Contrairy and other stories (1884)
- The Luckiest Girl in Yorkshire and other stories (1907)

=== Children’s stories ===
- Sybil’s Friend and How She Found Him (1873)
- The Little Marine and the Japanese Lily (1891)

=== Collaborations ===
- Twenty Novelettes (1889)
- The Fate of Fenella (with 23 other authors) (1892)
- Seven Xmas Eves, being the Romance of a Social Revolution (1894)
- The Summer Holiday (1898)

=== Plays ===
- Miss Chester (1871)

=== Memoirs ===
- Gup – Sketches of Anglo-Indian Life (1868)
- Life and Letters of Captain Marryat (1872)
- Tom Tiddler’s Ground (1886)

=== Spiritualism ===
- There is No Death (1891)
- The Clairvoyance of Bessie Williams (1893)
- The Spirit World (1894)

== Sources ==
- Herbermann, Charles, ed. (1913). "Florence Marryat" . Catholic Encyclopedia. New York: Robert Appleton Company.
- Lee, Elizabeth (1901). "Marryat, Florence" . In Lee, Sidney (ed.). Dictionary of National Biography (1st supplement). London: Smith, Elder & Co.
- Fodor, Nandor. "Florence Marryat," An Encyclopaedia of Psychic Science (1934).
