= The Professionals (1960 film) =

British crime thriller by Don Sharp

- British Front of House still
- Directed by: Don Sharp
- Written by: Peter Barnes
- Produced by: Norman Priggen
- Starring: William Lucas; Andrew Faulds; Colette Wilde
- Cinematography: Michael Reed
- Music by: William Alwyn
- Distributed by: Anglo-Amalgamated
- Release date: 6 June 1960 (UK)
- Running time: 61 mins
- Country: United Kingdom
- Language: English

The Professionals is a 1960 British crime thriller film, directed by Don Sharp and starring William Lucas, Andrew Faulds and Colette Wilde. It was written by Peter Barnes.

It screened on US television in 1961 as part of the Kraft Mystery Theatre series. It was one of a series of films Anglo-Amalgamated sold to US television for one million dollars.

== Premise ==
A gang of criminals, Joe Lawson, Vince Clayton and Eddie Holden, rob a suburban bank. Lawson then wants to rob a city bank and enlists the services of safe cracker Philip Bowman, who is just out of prison and is about to marry his girlfriend, Ruth. The thieves manage to rob the bank but Inspector Rankin interrogates Holden about the earlier robbery. Holden confesses and the police arrest the gang just as Bowman marries Ruth.

== Cast ==
- William Lucas as Philip Bowman
- Andrew Faulds as Inspector Rankin
- Colette Wilde as Ruth
- Stratford Johns as Lawson
- Vilma Ann Leslie as Mabel
- Edward Cast as Clayton
- Charles Vance as Eddie Holden
- Jack May as Edwards
- Eric Corrie as detective
- Arthur Skinner as plainclothes man
- Douglas Muir as Beaumont
- David Williams as constable
- Arthur Hewlett as Hoskins
- Patrick Boxill as Renagan
- Stuart Hillier as Condor
- Raymond Ray as night watchman
- Noel Coleman as Chief Inspector

== Production ==
In September 1959 it was announced that the director would be Sidney Hayers. The job of directing eventually went to Don Sharp, who had been going to make another film written by Barnes, Echo of Barbara, that does not seem to have been made. (There is a film called Echo Of Barbara from 1961, directed by Sidney Hayers and starring Mervyn Johns and Maureen Connell, which may be the film in question.)

It was the first fictional film Sharp made for Independent Artists, although he had made the documentary Keeping the Peace (1959) for the same producers. Independent Artists were based at Beaconsfield Film Studios but the studio was so busy at the time that The Professionals had to be filmed at Pinewood Studios.

== Release ==
In the UK the film was released on the bottom of a double bill with Goliath and the Barbarians (1959).

In the US it was the first episode of NBC's Kraft Mystery Theatre a series of 16 original mystery and suspense films from England, which replaced Perry Como over the summer in the US and Canada. Frank Gallop hosted. It debuted on 14 June 1961.

The film was so well received that Independent Artists then offered Sharp the job of directing another movie, Linda (1960). It also led to Sharp being offered Kiss of the Vampire (1963).

== Reception ==
Kinematograph Weekly called it an "engrossing and thrilling tale."

The Monthly Film Bulletin wrote: "The planning along the lines of a military operation, the trek through the sewers, the night watchman and his cat, the tear-gas and the fatal slip – these have quickly become the new stereotypes of the bank robbery nerve-stretcher. This tame and unconvincing example adds nothing new, unless it be an excruciatingly lady-like heroine, and no one connected with its execution, except perhaps William Lucas, appears to have taken the title very seriously."

The New York Times TV critic called the film "an item of first rate suspense".

Variety said "Don Sharp's direction was impressive in the heist sequences."

The Boston Globe called it "professional enough but just too commonplace to be absorbing."
