= Don Sharp =

Australian film director (1921–2011)

- Filming The Four Feathers (1978)
- Born: Donald Herman Sharp; 19 April 1921; Hobart, Tasmania, Australia
- Died: 14 December 2011 (aged 90); Wadebridge, Cornwall, England
- Occupations: Director, writer, actor
- Known for: Kiss of the Vampire (1963), Rasputin, the Mad Monk (1966)

Donald Herman Sharp (19 April 1921 – 14 December 2011) was an Australian film director.

His best known films were made for Hammer in the 1960s, and included Kiss of the Vampire (1963) and Rasputin, the Mad Monk (1966). In 1965 he directed The Face of Fu Manchu, based on the character created by Sax Rohmer, and starring Christopher Lee. Sharp also directed the sequel The Brides of Fu Manchu (1966). In the 1980s he was also responsible for several hugely popular miniseries adapted from the novels of Barbara Taylor Bradford.

== Early career ==
=== Early life ===
Sharp was born in Hobart, Tasmania, in 1921, according to official military records and his own account (some sources still give 1922 as his year of birth). He was the second of four children.

He attended St Virgil's College and began appearing regularly in theatre productions at the Playhouse Theatre in Hobart, where he trained under a young Stanley Burbury. He later said this was prompted "by a desire not to study to become an accountant, which is what my parents wanted for me." Among the plays Sharp appeared in were You Can't Take It With You and Our Town. He also directed a production of Stage Door. He studied accountancy in the evenings but this was interrupted by war service.

=== War service ===
Sharp enlisted in the Royal Australian Air Force on 7 April 1941 and was transferred to Singapore. In addition to his military duties he appeared in radio and on stage with a touring English company. Among his radio performances were Escape and The Barretts of Wimpole Street. "The acting bug had definitely gotten hold of me," says Sharp, "and I did a bit of it while I was in the RAAF as well, in the odd moment."

Sharp was invalided out before the city fell to the Japanese. He returned to Melbourne and recuperated at Heidelberg Hospital. Sharp spent the majority of his war service in Melbourne, appearing in amateur theatre productions of Quality Street and The Late Christopher Bean as well as recorded broadcasts and ABC plays.

In early 1943 Sharp moved to Hobart. He appeared in a theatre production of Interval by Sumner Locke Elliott, also serving as assistant director. Following this he appeared in a theatre revue, Khaki Kapers, notably in a sketch which figured a flag flown over the air force station in Singapore which Sharp had brought back with him.

Sharp was discharged from the air force on 17 March 1944 at the rank of corporal.

=== Acting career ===
After the war Sharp did not want to return to Hobart. He auditioned for and won an understudy's position in J. C. Williamson Limited version of the Broadway comedy Kiss and Tell; when a bout of laryngitis incapacitated one of the leads two weeks later, Sharp stepped into the role. He toured in the production from 1944-1945 then went on to appear in such plays as Arsenic and Old Lace (1945) and The Dancing Years. He worked for Morris West's production company in radio and played a small role in Smithy (1946), one of the few feature films shot in Australia at this time.

Sharp also toured Japan performing for the occupying troops there. From Japan he went to London in 1948. "I could have gone on with a theatrical career in Australia," says Sharp, "but what I really wanted was movies. So I went to England."

== Move to England ==
=== Ha'Penny Breeze ===
Arriving in England in 1948, Sharp got some stage work quickly "but I couldn't even get an appointment to see a casting director" for films.

He was sharing a flat with an assistant director and they decided to make their own film. He co-wrote Ha'penny Breeze (1950), with a fellow Australian, Frank Worth. Together with another man, Darcy Conyers, they formed a production company and raised finance to make the £8,000 film. Sharp also played a leading role, did the accounts and helped with the direction. The film was not a large hit but it was theatrically released.

Sharp also got a small role in a British radio adaptation of Robbery Under Arms (1950).

Sharp said "Shortly after, a number of influential film people made contact with me, but none of them offered me a job as an actor — they all asked if I would write for them!" Sharp was unable to cash in on Ha'penny Breeze as he came down with a recurrence of tuberculosis and spent nearly two years in hospital, during which he had six ribs and one lung removed.

=== Group 3 ===
When Sharp recovered he got some acting roles in such films as The Planter's Wife (1952), Appointment in London (1953), The Cruel Sea (1953) and You Know What Sailors Are (1954). Several of these films were directed by Ken Annakin who Sharp says was particularly helpful giving him jobs when needed.

He began to turn increasingly to writing and directing. Sharp said his background as an actor was useful for his development as a director, in particular it developed his sense of timing:

You’ve got to know, for example, a thing I was taught early in theatre – if there's a scene in a movie, in a play, that always gets good laughs, on a good night, when there's a good and laughing audience, you’ll get laughs in the build-up to it, in the five or ten minutes beforehand, because it's a good audience who's appreciative of what's going on. On a bad night, when the audience are not laughing, increase your pace, get them at the point. And this teaches you a control of speed and how to control an audience. . . . Working with good actors, you get a feeling of timing with them; although sometimes the timing between them can be good but their overall pace, which is quite different, can be wrong – its context in the film, because of the situation in the film, perhaps there should be that little more urgency, therefore pace, in the scene.

When Sharp was ill he received "messages of encouragement" from Michael Balcon, John Grierson and James Lawrie. When he got out of hospital he contacted them and they invited him to write an original story for Group Three, a new government-backed film company which had a brief to support new talent. Sharp sold them an original script called Child's Play (made 1952, released 1954). Group Three liked Sharp's work and assigned him to work on the script for Background; he was also given the job as assistant to the producer which he later called "the most wonderful education". He stayed with Group Three for two years, writing four films and working as a personal assistant to the producer on them, as well as (after three attempts) getting in the ACTT unnion. Sharp later said, "no doubt about it, Ha'penny Breeze paid off."

Group Three bought a story of Sharp's, originally called The Norfolk Story. He turned this into a novel called Conflict of Wings (1954), the title under which it was filmed; Sharp also collaborated on the screenplay with John Pudney, and did some second unit directing.

Sharp and Pudney then wrote The Blue Peter (1955) for Group Three. Once again, Sharp also directed second unit, and he began to develop ambitions to direct. Sharp was offered a job at Ealing Studios as a production assistant but decided to turn it down.

== Director ==
=== Early films and documentaries ===
Sharp left Group Three to direct some documentaries for Pathe. He worked on a proposed film at Ealing about the Skeleton Coast which was never made. Sharp's first feature as director was The Stolen Airliner (1955), made for the Children's Film Foundation, based on a script by Pudney.

Sharp then received an offer from the BBC to replace fellow Australian, Bruce Beeby, as an actor on the science fiction serial Journey into Space. The show was recorded on Sundays, enabling Sharp to appear in it while still continuiing with his writing and directing work. Sharp was hired by Ealing Studios to adapt the novel Robbery Under Arms into a feature film script. He says some of his work was included in the final script which was ultimately done by Bill Lipscomb.

Sharp made some television documentary shows for Pathe. During the making of one of them, Crossroads (1955), a film about why British soldiers left the army, he met actor Mary Steele who he later married. Sharp directed a "three reeler" for Warwick Films in Rome called Arrivederci Roma (1956). This was followed by a documentary for Martin Films, The Passing Years (1957), a dramatised documentary about the British motor industry.

Sharp's second feature film as director as another for the Children's Film Foundation, The Adventures of Hal 5. He received an offer to direct second unit on Carve Her Name with Pride (1958), directed by Lewis Gilbert; Sharp was responsible for various action sequences.

Sharp wrote and directed The Golden Disc (1959), starring his wife, Mary Steele. This was the first British rock 'n' roll movie – released a year before the Cliff Richard vehicle Expresso Bongo (1959) and a full two years ahead of Beat Girl (1960). Sharp was hired to do more second unit work, on Harry Black (1958), which involved shooting tiger footage in India. After this he made a documentary for American television at Expo 58, and one for the British army called Keeping the Peace (1959).

=== Independent Artists ===
After an unsuccessful attempt to get up finance for a film with Lonnie Donegan Sharp made two films for Independent Artists. The first was a low-budget thriller, The Professionals (1960), which screened on US TV as part of the Kraft Mystery Theatre. The second was Linda (1960), a teen drama starring Carol White for Independent Artists, which went out as a support feature for Saturday Night and Sunday Morning (1960) and is now considered a lost film. Sharp then made another army documentary.

He went into TV, becoming the resident director for the first season of Ghost Squad (1961–62). Sharp directed Two Guys Abroad (1962) with George Raft, which was intended as a pilot for a TV series or as a B movie, but ended up not being released at all. Sharp then directed second unit on The Fast Lady (1962) for Ken Annakin.

=== Hammer Films and Harry Alan Towers ===
Sharp received an offer from Tony Hinds of Hammer Films who had seen The Professionals and was looking for a director for Hammer's vampire movie Kiss of the Vampire (1963). Sharp had never seen a horror movie before but agreed after watching several Hammer films. According to his obituary Sharp helped make an "atmospheric, suspenseful gothic horror and giving a depth to the characters that was sometimes missing in Hammer's other vampire productions." Kiss of the Vampire is now one of Hammer's most highly regarded horrors; Sharp's New York Times obituary says "Not a few Hammer fans contend that Kiss of the Vampire is one of the greatest Gothic horror movies ever made".

Kiss of the Vampire was shot in 1962. After making it, Sharp went back to television, directing episodes of The Human Jungle, then made another teen musical in the vein of The Golden Disc, It's All Happening (1963), with Tommy Steele.

He returned to Hammer for a swashbuckler, The Devil-Ship Pirates (1964) which starred Christopher Lee, who would make several movies with Sharp. By now Kiss of the Vampire had been released, and Sharp started receiving offers to direct more horror films; he says Milton Subotsky offered him the choice of three scripts but Sharp liked none of them. Instead Sharp made Witchcraft (1964), for producer Robert L. Lippert. Sharp called it "a little four-week movie, very quickly done, but it received some lovely notices".

Sharp then spent several months directing second unit on Those Magnificent Men in Their Flying Machines (1965) at the behest of director Ken Annakin. Sharp said "I had to think very hard about going back to second unit after directing a half-dozen features — but it was so tempting, especially after my air force days. So I did it; and it was tremendously exciting, and a marvelous movie to work on." Sharp did find shooting footage with old airplanes very slow - "you're fortunate if you can get two set-ups in a day" so when his work was done on Magnificent Men he asked his agent to get him any directing job he could. He wound up making a sequel to The Fly for Robert Lippert, Curse of the Fly (1965). "I'm afraid they'd pretty much run out of ideas," said Sharp who says he and the writer "both had the feeling,'Oh dear, what a pity they're making another one'."

Sharp reteamed with Lee for The Face of Fu Manchu (1965), produced by Harry Alan Towers in Ireland. Sharp later said "I like Harry, a great deal... but Harry will get more kick out of making $5 in a slightly crooked and fast way, than he would making $100 legitimately; he's a dealer rather than a movie maker, and he enjoys getting the best part of a deal. But he does have a certain enthusiasm, and a sense of showmanship. In order to make a good film while working with Harry, you have to be insistent."

Fu Manchu was a big hit and led to four sequels; Sharp only directed the first of these, but he worked several more times for Towers who later said he "kept using Don because his films came in on budget and were without exception very successful. On top of that he was a most agreeable person of very good character – no tantrums – clear headed – resourceful; a gentleman too." The movie would give Sharp a reputation for action movies. He later stated his philosophy:

You can’t do big action sequences and then have flabby, everyday stuff round it. Those movies have got to have a feeling of latent energy in there... You can’t do action sequences as an entity in themselves. They’ve got to be part of the way a whole movie is developing. You’ve got to have, apart from energy, a very good sense of editing, what a camera can do... a sense of timing... and an ability to have a visual of exactly what it's going to look like... Also, I enjoyed it... some directors... didn’t get the same enjoyment out of it; it was a necessity rather than a pleasure. I always liked doing it, liked doing action.

Sharp returned to Hammer for Rasputin, the Mad Monk (1966), with Lee playing the title role. In contrast with Kiss of the Vampire and The Devil Ship Pirates Sharp said he disliked this experience working for Hammer as the budgets were being tightened.

Sharp made two more films for Towers, Our Man in Marrakesh (1966), a spy spoof starring Tony Randall, and The Brides of Fu Manchu (1966), again with Lee. After this he worked on an adaptation of H.G. Wells' The Sleeper Awakes for American International Pictures; Sharp said Sam Arkoff, head of AIP ultimately decided not to make this movie because it did "not have enough sex and violence".

Sharp then made Jules Verne's Rocket to the Moon (1967), an adventure tale in the vein of Magnificent Men in Their Flying Machines for Towers. Sharp and Towers were meant to follow this with Casanova, a film in the style of Tom Jones (1963) from a script by Peter Yeldham to be shot in Czechoslovakia starring Horst Buchholz. This film was ultimately cancelled due to tensions following the Six-Day War. Also not made was another proposed Sharp-Towers collaboration, Legion of the Damned, based on a script by Harry Spalding, which was to have been shot in Spain; Sharp says Towers was unable to raise the finance, and their collaborations ended.

Sharp said "after a couple of months of doing nothing" he returned to TV, directing some episodes of The Avengers (1968) and The Champions (1969). He was hired by producer George Willoughby to direct Taste of Excitement (1969), which then led to making The Violent Enemy for the same producers (the former would be released first). Sharp was offered The Vengeance of She at Hammer but was unable to take the job. Sharp was meant to direct the feature film version of Till Death Us Do Part but clashed with Johnny Speight over the script and was fired before filming.

=== Puppet on a Chain and 70s movies ===
Sharp said he was "out of work for about a year" when he got an offer to direct a boat chase sequence for Puppet on a Chain (1971), based on a novel by Alistair MacLean. The producers liked his work so much they hired him to shoot some additional footage. In 2007 Sharp said the film earned him a reputation as "The Doctor" and he was still getting royalties from the movie.

Sharp worked on a number of films which did not get made including Turncoat from a script by Peter Yeldham, a project with Judy Geeson called Dead, and a film in Israel for the producers of Puppet on a Chain. Michael Carreras of Hammer asked Sharp to take over from Seth Holt who had died while directing Blood from the Mummy's Tomb (1971) but Sharp was unable as he had a contract to make the aforementioned film in Israel. According to Filmink "it’s a great shame Sharp only worked with" Hammer three times "because he was one of their best ever directors."

Sharp was put under long-term contract to a company called Scotia who assigned him to direct Psychomania (1973), the final movie of George Sanders. This picture has become a cult classic; Sharp called it "great fun to do, especially after doing several films in a row like The Violent Enemy. It was a great change, geared for a younger audience as it was." Scotia loaned out Sharp's services to another company so he could direct Dark Places (1973). Sharp then developed further projects with Scotia, and worked for months on another project to be made in Israel; neither was made, nor was a proposed version of the Robin Hood story.

Sharp's next project was Callan (1974), a big screen adaptation of the TV series starring Edward Woodward (1967–72). During the making of that film Sharp received an offer to direct a thriller, Hennessy (1975), with Rod Steiger in the title role, as an IRA man out to assassinate Queen Elizabeth II. This led to Sharp receiving an offer from producer Harry Saltzman to work on The Micronauts, a "shrunken man" epic to have starred Gregory Peck and Lee Remick. Sharp worked on the film for months before deciding to leave the project, which was ultimately never made.

Michael Carreras offered Sharp the job of directing To the Devil a Daughter for Hammer and he was interested but Sharp ultimately pulled out due to dissatisfaction with the script. Sharp worked on some films that were not made: a proposed film adaptation of Alistair MacLean's The Way to Dusty Death; a horror film, Croc; an adaptation of Jeffrey Archer's Not a Penny More, Not a Penny Less; an adaptation of Alistair MacLean's Bear Island (originally postponed); a biopic of Kim Philby.

Sharp received an offer to direct the fourth version of The Four Feathers (1978), made for American TV but released theatrically in some markets. He then directed another remake, The Thirty Nine Steps (1978), with Robert Powell (who had been in Four Feathers). Greg Smith, who produced The Thirty Nine Steps, said he hired Sharp "because he's one of Britain's best action adventure directors and he was familiar with the period." The film was very popular.

Eventually the Bear Island (1979), project was re-activated and was made starring Richard Widmark, Donald Sutherland and Vanessa Redgrave. It was one of the most expensive Canadian films ever made and a box office flop. Following this Sharp was going to make a version of two other MacLean novels - Goodbye California, with Charlton Heston, and Air Force One is Down - but the finance fell through for both. Neither made were adaptations of Quicksand by Wilfred Greatorex and Scoop by Evelyn Waugh.

=== Later career ===
Sharp returned to TV with episodes of Hammer House of Horror (1980) ("Guardian of the Abyss") and QED (1982) (TV series). "It was nice to shoot something again," said Sharp.

Sharp developed several projects that were not made - Spy Ship; a biopic of John Simpson Kirkpatrick; Red Alert West; a film about the Spanish Civil War. A film that was made was What Waits Below (1984) shot in America with Robert Powell in the lead role; it was an unhappy experience for Sharp. He developed a film version of Jack Higgins' novel A Prayer for the Dying but the eventual movie was directed by Mike Hodges. However Sharp was then called in to replace the original director on the mini series A Woman of Substance (1985); based on the novel by Barbara Taylor Bradford, and starring Jenny Seagrove and Deborah Kerr. This was a huge ratings success.

After Tusitala (1986), an Australian mini series shot in Samoa, Sharp directed Hold the Dream (1986), a mini-series sequel to Woman of Substance, with Jenny Seagrove reprising her role. Tears in the Rain (1988) was a TV movie from a novel by Pamela Wallace which gave an early starring role to Sharon Stone. Act of Will (1989) was another mini series based on a novel by Barbara Taylor Bradford, which starred Liz Hurley.

== Personal life ==
Sharp married Australian actress Gwenda Wilson in 1945, after appearing on stage with her in Kiss and Tell. In 1956, he married actress Mary Steele who he had met while shooting a documentary, Crossroads.

Sharp died on 14 December 2011, after a short spell in hospital. He was survived by Mary Steele, two sons and a daughter. Another son, Massive Attack producer Jonny Dollar, predeceased him in 2009.

== Filmography ==
=== As actor ===
- Smithy (1946)
- Ha'penny Breeze (1950, also writer, producer) – Johnny Craig
- The Planter's Wife (1952) – Lieutenant Summers (uncredited)
- Appointment in London (1953) – Mid Upper Gunner (uncredited)
- The Cruel Sea (1953) – Lieutenant-Commander (final film role)
- You Know What Sailors Are (1954)
- Journey into Space (1953–54) (radio serial)
- The Red Planet (1954–55) (radio serial)

=== As writer only ===
- Background (1953)
- Conflict of Wings (1954) – also novel, and second unit director
- Child's Play (1954) - and second unit director
- The Blue Peter (1955) – and second unit director

=== 2nd Unit Director Only ===
- Carve Her Name with Pride (1958)
- Harry Black (1958)
- The Fast Lady (1962)
- Those Magnificent Men in Their Flying Machines (1965)
- Puppet on a Chain (1971) – 8-minute boat chase sequence, also script.

=== As director ===
- The Stolen Airliner (1955) – also script
- As Old as the Windmill (1957) (documentary)
- The Changing Life (1958) (documentary)
- Keeping the Peace (1959) (documentary)
- The Golden Disc (1959) – also script
- The Adventures of Hal 5 (1959) – also script
- Linda (1960)
- The Professionals (1960)
- Ghost Squad (1961–62) (TV series)
- The Human Jungle (1963) (TV series) – episode "A Friend of the Serjeant Major"
- Two Guys Abroad (1962)
- It's All Happening (1963)
- Kiss of the Vampire (1963)
- Witchcraft (1964)
- The Devil-Ship Pirates (1964)
- Curse of the Fly (1965)
- The Face of Fu Manchu (1965)
- Rasputin, the Mad Monk (1966)
- Our Man in Marrakesh (1966)
- The Brides of Fu Manchu (1966)
- The Violent Enemy (1967)
- Jules Verne's Rocket to the Moon (1967)
- The Avengers (1968) (TV series) – episodes "Get-A-Way!", "The Curious Case of the Countless Clues", "Invasion of the Earthmen"
- The Champions (1969) (TV series) – episode "Project Zero"
- Taste of Excitement (1969) – also script
- Dark Places (1973) – also script
- Psychomania (1973)
- Callan (1974)
- Hennessy (1975)
- The Four Feathers (1978) (TV film)
- The Thirty Nine Steps (1978)
- Bear Island (1979) – also script
- Hammer House of Horror (1980) (TV series) — episode "Guardian of the Abyss"
- QED (1982) (TV series) – episode "The Limehouse Connection"
- A Woman of Substance (1985) (TV mini-series)
- What Waits Below (1985)
- Tusitala (1986) (TV mini-series)
- Hold the Dream (1986) (TV)
- Tears in the Rain (1988) (TV)
- Act of Will (1989) (TV)

=== Unmade projects ===
Sharp was announced for the following projects which were not made:

- Sleeper Awakens (circa 1967) from the novel by H. G. Wells with Christopher Lee and Vincent Price for Harry Alan Towers
- Spaceborn – an action suspense story that was to start filming in 1972
- Philby (circa 1977) – biopic of Kim Philby starring Michael Caine in the lead role supported by Nicol Williamson as Guy Burgess and Vanessa Redgrave as Philby's first wife
- Outpost (circa 1983) - a "futuristic action drama"

== Theatre credits ==
- The Man from Toronto (January 1940) – The Playhouse, Hobart – actor
- You Can't Take It with You by Kaufman and Hart (April 1940) – The Playhouse, Hobart – actor
- I Killed the Count by Alec Coppel (August 1940) – The Playhouse, Hobart – actor
- Tonight at 8.30 – "Hands Across the Sea" and "Ways and Means" by Noël Coward (October 1940) – The Playhouse, Hobart – actor
- Our Town by Thornton Wilder (March 1941) – The Playhouse, Hobart – actor
- revue at Theatre Royal Hobart (April 1941) – actor
- Dear Octopus (May 1941) – The Playhouse, Hobart – assistant producer
- Quiet Wedding (June 1941) – The Playhouse, Hobart – actor
- Silver Lining Revue (June 1941) – The Playhouse, Hobart – performer
- Stage Door (mid 1941) – The Playhouse, Hobart – producer
- The Barretts of Wimpole Street (late 1941) – Singapore – actor
- Quality Street (1942) – Melbourne – actor
- The Late Christopher Bean (1942) – Melbourne – actor
- Interval by Sumner Locke Elliott (February 1943) – The Playhouse, Hobart – actor, assistant producer
- Khaki Kapers musical revue (April 1943) – Theatre Royal, Hobart – contributing writer
- The Amazing Dr Clitterhouse by Barre Lyndon (December 1944) – Comedy Theatre, Melbourne – actor
- Kiss and Tell (1944–45) – national tour for J.C. Williamson Ltd – actor
- Arsenic and Old Lace (1945) – national tour for J.C. Williamson Ltd – actor
- The Dancing Years by Ivor Novello (June 1946) – His Majesty's Theatre, Melbourne

== Radio credits ==
- Joseph Lister, Surgeon (March 1944)
- The Lawsons (1945) (serial) - recurring role as Eric
- Never Say Die (June 1947)
- Robbery Under Arms (1950) (serial)
- Journey Into Space (1957) (serial)

== Sources ==
- Koetting, Christopher (1995). "Costume Dramas". Hammer Horror. pp. 7–13.
- The Midnight Writer (December 1983). "Sharp Turns". Fangoria. No. 31. pp. 14–18.
- Vagg, Stephen (27 July 2019). "Unsung Aussie Filmmakers: Don Sharp – A Top 25". Filmink.
- Sharp, Don (2 November 1993). "Interview with Don Sharp" (Interview). Interviewed by Teddy Darvas and Alan Lawson. London: History Project.
- Sharp, Don (July 1963). "How to get into films by the people themselves". Films and Filming. p. 13-14.
