= The Adventures of Hal 5 =

1958 British film by Don Sharp

- Opening titles
- Directed by: Don Sharp
- Written by: Don Sharp
- Based on: novel Hal 5 and the Haywards by Henry Donald
- Produced by: Gilbert Church
- Starring: William Russell
- Production company: Bushey Film Studios
- Distributed by: Children's Film Foundation
- Release date: 1958
- Running time: 57 mins
- Country: United Kingdom
- Language: English

The Adventures of Hal 5 (also known as Hal Five) is a 1958 British children's adventure film directed by Don Sharp and starring William Russell and John Glyn-Jones. It was produced for the Children's Film Foundation (CCF) and was written by Sharp based on the 1955 novel Hal 5 and the Haywards by Henry Donald.

== Plot ==
Hal 5, an old car, is discovered by two children and purchased by their uncle, a vicar. The garage proprietor, Goorlie, conceals Hal's faulty transmission.

== Cast ==
- William Russell as the vicar
- John Glyn-Jones as Mr. Goorlie
- David Morrell as Mr. Dicey
- Edwin Richfield as Cooper
- Kathleen Williams as Grannie
- Peter Godsell as Charles
- Janina Faye as Moira
- Michael Maguire as Ginger
- Ian Higginson as Titch
- Martin Boddey as the doctor
- Bartlett Mullins as Ben

== Production ==
Sharp had previously directed The Stolen Airliner for the CCF.

== Reception ==
The Monthly Film Bulletin wrote: "In spite of some technical crudities this is a charming little film. 'Hal' has a genuine personality, the children are attractive and are not asked to act beyond their modest capabilities. The adults know their place, and there are several entertaining accidents with pipes, buckets and ponds – all gratifyingly full of water."

Robert Shall wrote that Hal 5 "combines two favorite CFF elements: gentle fantasy and nostalgic affection for vintage vehicles of varying kinds...the appeal, apart from the charming anthropomorphic car, lies in the presentation of a rural idyll... the pace is particularly leisurely."

In British Sound Films: The Studio Years 1928–1959 David Quinlan rated the film as "good", writing: "British relative of The Love Bug is charming, full of fun."
