= David Morrell (actor) =

British actor (1926–1974)

- Born: 27 October 1926; Carmarthenshire, Wales, UK
- Died: 5 December 1974 (aged 48); Paddington, London, England, UK
- Occupation: Actor

David Morrell (27 October 1926 – 5 December 1974) was a Welsh actor.

== Film appearances ==
- The Dam Busters (1955) – Flight Lieutenant W. Astell, D.F.C.
- Simon and Laura (1955) – T.V. Producer
- A Hill in Korea (1956) – The Regular Soldiers: Pte. Henson / Pte Henson
- The Adventures of Hal 5 (1958) – Dicey
- Death and the Sky Above (1961)
- Two Letter Alibi (1962) – Detective Sergeant Day
- Three Hats for Lisa (1965) – P.C. Hanbury

== Television appearances ==
- The Adventures of Sir Lancelot: 21 episodes (1956–57)
- This Day in Fear TV film (1958)
- BBC Sunday-Night Play: The Squeeze (1960)
- Pathfinders in Space: Spaceship from Nowhere (1960)
- The True Mystery of the Passion TV film (1960)
- Five Bells for Logan TV film (1961)
- Three Live Wires: The Play Off (1961)
- BBC Sunday-Night Play: Six Men of Dorset (1962)
- Garry Halliday: Two for the Price of One (1962)
- No Hiding Place: Little Girl Stolen (1962)
- Suspense: A Ride in a Pram (1963)
- The Plane Makers: The Testing Time (1963)
- Coronation Street: Episode No. 1.248 (1963)
- Lorna Doone: 5 episodes (1963)
- The Saint: The Well Meaning Mayor (1963)
- Meet the Wife: The Strain (1964)
- Theatre 625: Women in Crisis No. 3: My Grandmother (1964)
- The Villains: Hideaway (1964)
- The Scales of Justice: Personal and Confidential (1965)
- No Hiding Place: Found Dead (1965)
- The Man in Room 17: The Years of Glory (1965)
- R3: Unwelcome Visitor (1965)
