= Dark Places (1974 film) =

1974 British film by Don Sharp

- Directed by: Don Sharp
- Written by: Ed Brennan; Joseph Van Winkle
- Produced by: James Hannah Jr.
- Starring: Christopher Lee; Joan Collins; Herbert Lom
- Cinematography: Ernest Steward
- Edited by: Teddy Darvas
- Music by: Wilfred Josephs
- Production company: Glenbeigh Limited
- Distributed by: Cinerama Releasing Corporation (USA); EMI Film Distributors (UK)
- Release date: May 10, 1974 (US); June 1975 (UK)
- Running time: 91 minutes
- Country: United Kingdom
- Language: English

Dark Places is a 1974 British psychological horror film directed by Don Sharp and starring Robert Hardy, Christopher Lee, Joan Collins and Herbert Lom. It was written by Ed Brennan and Joseph Van Winkle.

== Plot ==
After the previous owner Andrew Marr dies, Edward Foster inherits his mansion. Despite attempts to scare him out of the house, that is rumoured to be haunted, he decides to renovate and inhabit it.

Unknown to him, Marr’s former physician Dr Ian Mandeville and his sister Sarah compete with solicitor Prescott in trying to locate two suitcases of money rumoured to be hidden on the large estate, that he hopes to claim for himself.

Edward, later revealed to have been recently released from an asylum, soon starts hearing voices and begins to have flashbacks of the life of Andrew Marr, slowly witnessing the latter’s marriage to his mentally unstable wife Victoria fall apart. Andrew had planned to leave her for the younger and more attractive governess Alta. In desperation Victoria had encouraged the two equally psychotic children to murder the governess whilst she attempted to seduce Andrew in the bedroom. Hearing the children murder Alta, Andrew strangled his wife and killed the children with a sword before bricking all four corpses up behind a wall with the two cases of money.

Edward, driven mad by the constant flashbacks and unable to distinguish between himself and Andrew, accidentally strangles Sarah while experiencing the murder of Andrew’s wife. He kills Dr Mandeville with a pick axe and attempts to kill Prescott before being arrested and led away by police, who also seize the money.

== Cast ==
- Christopher Lee as Doctor Ian Mandeville
- Joan Collins as Sarah Mandeville
- Herbert Lom as Prescott
- Jane Birkin as Alta
- Robert Hardy as Edward Foster / Andrew Marr
- Jean Marsh as Victoria
- Carleton Hobbs as Old Marr
- Roy Evans as Baxter
- Martin Boddey as Sgt. Riley
- John Glyn-Jones as bank manager
- John Levene as doctor
- Jennifer Thanisch as Jessica
- Michael McVey as Francis
- Barry Linehan as asylum gatekeeper

== Production ==
The film was shot towards the end of 1972 at an old asylum near Uxbridge.

Director Don Sharp was under contract to the Scotia studio at the time, who loaned him out to make this film. In a 1993 interview he said that "apart from one slow sequence" near the beginning, the movie "had some super stuff", but that it was "a very strange production all the way through" in part because producer James Hannah was eccentric. "Nobody could figure out why he was making a movie," recalled Sharp, who said there were rumours that the film was being made as a tax loss. James Hannah (1930-2006) was the American heir to a shipping fortune who led what his obituary called "a jet set lifestyle based in London" and who "dabbled in theatre shows" as well as producing Dark Places.

Christopher Lee told his biographer Robert Pohle: "it was a fascinating, very clever story, a fantasy. It was shot in a house not far from Pinewood Studios: a house empty and abandoned, water dripping down the walls, no proper plumbing, no heating. Thoroughly uncomfortable film to make." The location "was perfect casting, for Robert Hardy’s house was supposed to be in a similar state." Lee added, "I don’t think the film was very successful, but I rather liked it; a great cast and director, and an interesting, if a bit convoluted, story." He enjoyed working with Herbert Lom ("great to work with") and Joan Collins ("a real pro").

The movie was one of a series of horror and psychological thrillers Collins made in the 1970s in England. "I became known by the British press as Queen of the Horror Films — a title I didn't particularly relish," wrote Collins later. "But I was resilient. A survivor. I considered myself lucky to be working so much after such a long period away from the British screen, particularly since I was well into my thirties."

== Release ==
There were delays in releasing the film. "There were rumours it had disappeared," said Sharp, who said twenty years after filming was completed he started receiving cheques from the film being sold to cable TV in Switzerland.

The movie was released in the US in May 1974 and in Britain in 1975.

== Critical reception ==
The Monthly Film Bulletin wrote: "Parts of this rather Hammerish horror are quite ingeniously plotted but how unfortunate that the action should revolve round that most hackneyed of institutions, the old dark house (complete with attendant trappings: the frightened taxi driver who warns that no one from the village goes up to Marr's Grove after dark; the sinister doctor who contrives supernatural manifestations to scare off the new resident). Don Sharp has his work cut out for him trying to gee up this old warhorse but achieves a couple of quite agreeable frissons when the moribund Marr suddenly sits bolt upright to gasp his last ("Alta, dear God, forgive me"), and when Foster knocks a hole in his bedroom wall thereby releasing a flock of bats. Sharp also manages to keep his head when all about are losing theirs (literally in the case of the two children) during a grisly denouement. His timing and discretion keep the carnage just the right side of crude excess."

The Los Angeles Times calls it "implausible but rather enjoyable."

The Daily Breeze called it "a masterpiece of its kind... an intense psychological thriller that keeps your eyes glued to the screen."

TV Guide awarded the film 1/5 stars, calling it "mediocre in all respects."

Dave Sindelar from Fantastic Movie Musings and Ramblings wrote: "Though there’s not a whole lot of novelty to this story of ghostly possession, it does have some interesting points to it. I like the way that the protagonist finds himself shuttled back and forth between his life in the present and the life of the possessing spirit in the past. Furthermore, the movie is well acted, with solid work from Christopher Lee, Joan Collins, Robert Hardy and Herbert Lom. However, the problems eventually sink the production. The pace is quite sluggish throughout, and it tends to repeat some of its ideas more often than is strictly necessary. Its worst problems arrive towards the end of the movie; the revelations about the past events in the house have a somewhat silly edge to them, and the movie loses a lot of steam in its final moments and ends with a whimper rather than a bang. In short, it’s watchable, but not very memorable."

=== Home media ===
The film was released for the first time on DVD by Film 2000 on 20 November 2006.
