= The Rainbow Jacket =

1954 British film by Basil Dearden

- Original UK quad format poster
- Directed by: Basil Dearden
- Written by: T.E.B. Clarke
- Produced by: Michael Balcon; Michael Relph
- Starring: Kay Walsh; Bill Owen; Edward Underdown; Robert Morley; Honor Blackman
- Cinematography: Otto Heller
- Edited by: Jack Harris
- Music by: William Alwyn
- Production company: Ealing Studios
- Distributed by: General Film Distributors
- Release date: 27 May 1954
- Running time: 99 minutes
- Country: United Kingdom
- Language: English

The Rainbow Jacket (also known as Newmarket Heath) is a 1954 British drama film directed by Basil Dearden, and starring Robert Morley, Kay Walsh, Bill Owen, Honor Blackman and Sid James. It was written by T.E.B. Clarke.

== Premise ==
A champion jockey, having forfeited his own career by taking a bribe, takes a young rider under his wing.

At a racetrack meeting banned former jockey Sam is checking the perimeter for illicit means of entry and a cheeky young boy, Georgie, shows him how to get in. Georgie show a penchant for horse riding and is befriended by Sam who encourages him to train as a jockey.

He is placed in the stables of Lord Logan at Newmarket. He shows much promise and Sam bets £100 on him to win. Georgie is impressive but a photo finish shows he comes second. On his second race his mother steals £50 from her employer's safe and bets it on him to win. He comes first but a stewards’ inquiry wrongly disqualifies him and his mother loses the money.

On the third race and for his mother’s sake, Sam persuades Georgie to take a fall to throw the race but when Sam visits in the first aid area their connection is exposed. Sam faces another ban but Georgie’s staunch defence of his character to the stewards eventually leads to Sam having his license renewed.

But in the final classic of the season, the St Leger, the two are neck and neck and Sam clearly whips Georgie’s horse to urge it on and to win. He does this because he has realized that Georgie was trying to throw the race to avoid implicating Sam in the throwing of the early third race. Georgie felt he had no choice as he was being threatened by Sam's bookmaker, but Sam doesn't want Georgie to ruin his career.

Sam’s actions of course mean he is finally banned from racing and after a final piece of illicit betting he retires to live with Georgie’s widowed mother, with the intention to buy his friend's sandwich van.

== Cast ==
- Fella Edmonds as Georgie Crain
- Kay Walsh as Barbara Crain
- Bill Owen as Sam
- Edward Underdown as Geoffrey Tyler
- Robert Morley as Lord Logan
- Honor Blackman as Mrs Tyler
- Charles Victor as Mr Voss
- Wilfrid Hyde-White as Lord Stoneleigh
- Ronald Ward as Bernie Rudd
- Howard Marion-Crawford as Travers
- Sid James as Harry
- Michael Trubshawe as Gresham
- Sam Kydd as Bruce
- Colin Kemball as Archie Stevens
- Michael Ripper as Benny Loder
- Frederick Piper as Lukey
- Herbert C. Walton as Adams
- George Thorpe as Ross
- Eliot Makeham as valet
- Brian Roper as Ron Saunders
- Bernard Lee as racketeer
- Glyn Houston as security man at stables
- Katie Johnson as sports paper reader on train
- Raymond Glendenning as racing commentator
- Gordon Richards cameo as a jockey

== Production ==
The film was made at Ealing Studios produced by Michael Balcon and Michael Relph and shot in Technicolor. The film's sets were designed by the art director Thomas N. Morahan. Location shooting took place in London and at a variety of racecourse towns including Newmarket and Epsom. The film was released by General Film Distributors as a part of a long-term arrangement with Ealing.

== Reception ==
The film premiered at the Odeon Leicester Square in London on 27 May 1954, and the reviewer for The Times wrote that, "It is, then, an entertaining film, a film in love with racing and yet not quite so devotedly so as to refrain from suggesting that in the running of the St. Leger there can be some very queer goings-on indeed."

The Monthly Film Bulletin wrote: "Basil Dearden's direction, as in The Square Ring, is more sober and more genuinely incisive than in his earlier films, and maintains an admirable competence. The colour is variable, and some of the process work is ugly. Performances are generally very adequate; the boy, Fella Edmonds, is excellent, Bill Owen (as Sam) authentically and convincingly underplays, and Robert Morley (as Lord Logan) amusingly but not altogether convincingly overplays. And there is a nice little episode with a surprising old lady (Katie Johnson) in a train."

Kine Weekly wrote: "The picture deals fully with its subject and introduces everything from a finish to stable manners, roguery and enquiries by the Stewards, and visit to Lingfield, Sandown and Doncaster. But atmosphere and detail, although impeccable, are not created at the cost of human interest."

TV Guide felt that "a trite outcome mars this fairly entertaining film, which features real-life British racing figures Raymond Glendenning and Gordon Richards."

Time Out noted that the film was "the first collaboration between Dearden and TEB Clarke after The Blue Lamp... Despite its intriguing subject, the film offers little but the cosy, sentimental view of life that is typical of late Ealing films."

== See also ==
- List of films about horses
- List of films about horse racing
