= Jennifer Thanisch =

English actress

Jennifer Thanisch (born 24 April 1964) is an English former child actress, most active during the 1970s.

== Life ==
Jennifer Thanisch is a native of Laleham, Middlesex, where her parents owned the Three Horseshoes, a public house. Her first role was in the 1973 film Dark Places, which starred Christopher Lee and Joan Collins. She is well known for having played Flying Squad Detective Inspector Jack Regan's daughter, Susan, in the Thames Television/ITV detective series The Sweeney. Her most famous role was Anne in the televised version of Enid Blyton's children's book series The Famous Five, produced by Southern Television for ITV in the UK, in 1978 and 1979. She has made few acting appearances since the 1970s.

Married with two grown-up children, she lives today in Lewes, Sussex and is a religious education teacher in a primary school. In late 2008 she was reunited with her fellow Famous Five co-star Marcus Harris for an item celebrating fifty years of ITV in the south of England and which was broadcast on the regional news programmes Meridian Tonight and Thames Valley Tonight. The special was called "Famous Five revisited".

In February 2011 Sunshine Hospital Radio brought Jennifer together with Gary Russell (Dick), Marcus Harris (Julian) and series writer and BAFTA award winner Gail Renard for their first group interview in over 30 years. The 30-minute interview, entitled "Famous Five Reunited" was made available to download from the station's website.

== Filmography ==
- Dark Places (1973) (also known as: Das Grab der lebenden Puppen) as Jessica
- Spy Trap (1973) (episode: "A Perfect Victim")
- Lorna Doone (1976) (episode: #1.1) as Young Lorna
- The Sweeney (1975–1976) (three episodes) as Susie Regan
- Leap in the Dark (1977) (episode: "The Fetch") as Ludovika
- The Famous Five (1978–1979) (TV series) as Anne
