= Tears in the Rain =

1988 television movie

- Genre: Drama; Romance; War
- Based on: Tears in the Rain by Pamela Wallace
- Written by: Freda Kelsall
- Directed by: Don Sharp
- Starring: Sharon Stone; Christopher Cazenove; Leigh Lawson; Anna Massey
- Music by: Barrie Guard

Production
- Executive producers: Jonathan Dana; John Goldstone; Keith Richardson
- Producer: Peter Snell
- Cinematography: Ken Westbury
- Editor: Teddy Darvas
- Running time: 100 minutes
- Production companies: Atlantic Videoventures; British Lion Film Corporation; Yorkshire Television

Original release
- Release: 1988

Tears in the Rain is a 1988 television film directed by Don Sharp and starring Sharon Stone and Christopher Cazenove. It was one of a series of films produced in the Harlequin Romance Movie Series (USA).

It was one of the last films directed by Australian Don Sharp.

The film is based on the novel of the same name written by Pamela Wallace and published in the Silhouette Special Edition line of romance novels in 1985 by Simon & Schuster before the Silhouette brand was acquired by Harlequin. There are alterations to the plot line made by the screenwriter but the essential story has stayed the same. The action and events take place in two time periods in England, the 1940s and the 1980s. The World War Two story is told in flashbacks.

== Plot ==
Casey Cantrell (Sharon Stone) sets off for the UK to personally take a letter to Lord Richard Bredon, the last request of her late mother. A failed attempt to find him at his country residence has her falling from a wall into the arms of Lord Bredon's playboy son, Michael (Christopher Cazenove). Casey manages to escape his grilling without giving her name, but the younger Bredon tracks her to an inn in the local village where he uses his clout to get it.

Casey accepts his dinner invitation in order to learn the whereabouts of his father. The evening is spent with the two trying to get information from each other. It ends with neither one being any more informed than when it started. Wanting to see her again and to continue to try and solve her mystery Michael convinces her to visit Bredon Hall the next day. While she is there, Michael's flamboyant best friend Hamdan al Dubai (Leigh Lawson) arrives. Not unexpectedly based on their mutual history, Hamdan immediately starts expressing an interest in Casey much to Michael’s annoyance. After Casey learns that Michael's father is in London, she accepts an offer made by Hamdan to go back there with him.

Continuing her quest, Casey finds Lord Bredon at his office in Half Moon Square. While visibly shaken by the news of Jessie's death, he denies ever having known her and refuses to accept the letter. Instead of deterring her, Richard's confusing reaction only serves to make her more determined to uncover the mystery. Meanwhile a still suspicious but intrigued Michael has found her again and asks her out for the following day

The next day Hamdan calls to charm Casey into having lunch with him on his yacht. Michael, upon finding out her plans with Hamden, shows up at lunch uninvited. The talk switches to a discussion of the party going on at Hamdan's house that evening. Hamdan invites her to the event but it's not until she finds out Lord Bredon is going to be there that she accepts. Later that evening as Casey is modeling her dress for the party, Michael happens to see that she's wearing a necklace that reminds him of his family crest. When she claims that it belonged to her mother, he persists in trying to talk about it, but she laughingly blows off the conversation.

At the party Casey and Michael have a confrontation with his father who accuses her of being a con artist and tells his son about her trip to his office. Michael, who has a deep fear of being taken in by a woman, immediately lays into her. Casey becomes distraught by both men attacking her and runs off. Michael chases after her ultimately cornering her in a garden house where they end up in a passionate embrace. He agrees to hear her side of the story and the pair leave the party.

Before his own departure, Richard has a flashback revealing the nature of his relationship with Jessie. Still concerned that Casey is trouble, Richard asks Hamdan to dig up information on her. Hamdan expresses his discomfort with the situation, but this falls on deaf ears.

Michael and Casey arrive at his apartment after her having told him the story about the letter on the way there. The two reexamine the pendant with him verifying that is the family crest. Casey and Michael end up sleeping together after the postulating theories about how Jessie and Richard knew each other. Meanwhile Richard is lost in his own memories about their meeting and Jessie’s connection to a Bredon family friend, Emily.

The next morning Hamdan calls Richard, and Richard asks him to work on Casey while he talks to Michael. Once again Hamdan expresses reluctance to involve himself, but Richard hangs up on him. Hamdan then goes to see Casey at her hotel and ends up following her to track down a woman whose name is in her mother's address book. Back at the office Richard confronts Michael about Casey, and then Michael turns the confrontation on him asking how Casey's mother got the pendant. Richard kicks him out and goes into a flashback about giving the pendant to Jessie.

Casey and Hamden end up going to a pub owned by Billie Cooper, the person in the address book. Billie confirms that Jessie was in England during the Second World War following Frank, Casey's father. Billie tells her about a fateful mission in which Frank was believed to have died trying to save Billie's husband. Billie also confirms that Richard and Jessie knew one another and that their interest in each other angered Richard's old friend, Emily. As the two are talking Hamdan finally calls a PI to investigate Casey.

Later at Michael's apartment, Casey and Michael discuss the latest revelations. This leads to a discussion of their feelings and a proposal of marriage from Michael. After at first questioning whether he means it, Casey accepts.

Having been told about Michael’s desire to marry Casey, Richard goes to meet with Hamdan at Bredon Enterprises to find out the results of the investigation on Casey. He not only learns that Casey's record is clear, but that Frank was discovered not to have died around the time that Jessie vanished. This changes his whole perspective on what happened, and he contacts Michael who Casey alone at his apartment to go to see him. While he is gone, Casey receives a visit from Michael's mother. She turns out to be the family friend, Emily. The story she tells reveals the truth about Michael’s parentage and that Jessie is his real mother.

Casey flees the flat and runs to Hamdan. She asks him to take her to the airport without explaining what happened. He reluctantly agrees believing she should talk to Michael first. Michael gets wind she is leaving and arrives to hear the story about their shared mother.

Richard confronts Emily about what happened during the war. A flashback reveals that in her determination to be the mistress of Bredon Hall and Richard's wife, she manipulated events so that Richard was led to believe that Jessie had abandoned him. She then screws the knife in further by revealing to him the truth about Michael.

On the drive to the airport, Casey reveals the whole story to Hamdan. As she dozes off in the seat next to him a flummoxed Hamdan picks up a file from his PI and looks through it. Whatever is in the file causes Hamdan mood to change for the positive. He has his driver take them to Bredon Hall where Richard and Michael have gotten together to share the reading of the letter. Hamdan's car pulls up outside and Casey awakens from her nap to find that she's there. She is distressed by this, but Hamdan convinces her to trust him. After gaining admittance, Hamdan hands Richard the file. Richard reads through it then tells Casey that she was adopted by Frank and Jessie meaning she can have a relationship with Michael. The film ends with Richard looking back on his time with Jessie and looking forward to the future for Michael and Casey.
