= Two Guys Abroad =

1962 British film by Don Sharp

- Directed by: Don Sharp
- Produced by: Ian Warren exec Maurie Suess
- Starring: George Raft; Maxie Rosenbloom; Diana Decker; Diane Todd
- Production company: Summit Films
- Release date: 1962 (intended)
- Running time: 75 mins
- Country: United Kingdom
- Language: English
- Budget: £20,000

Two Guys Abroad is an unreleased 1962 British film directed by Don Sharp and starring George Raft and Maxie Rosenbloom. The screenplay was by Alex Gottlieb. It was intended as a pilot for a TV series or as a B movie. Neither eventuated.

== Plot ==
A pair of Piccadilly Club owners continually get in trouble.

== Cast ==
- George Raft as nightclub owner
- Maxie Rosenbloom as nightclub owner
- Diane Todd
- Diana Decker
- David Lawton
- Barbara Lashbrook
- Sam Kydd

== Production ==
The film was shot at Shepperton Studios in March 1962. George Raft and Maxie Rosenbloom were old friends; Raft even once owned a share in Rosenbloom when the latter was a boxer.

Director Don Sharp later recalled "at the time there was a fashion for these 'products'. They were made for a double purpose: as a pilot episode for a TV series; if that failed, for release as a B movie supporting the main feature. Very few of them even made the grade."

Sharp said the film was made "on a very small budget in very minimal time... a terrible script." He said the film was made because Maurie Seuss had "come into money and wanted to make a movie"; Seuss had been George Raft's dresser.

Sharp says he "got on very well with George – the complete Hollywood pro. He was amiable, always ribbing Maxie; constantly doing his coin-flipping act; and likely at any moment to break into a few dance steps – for no particular reason. There is a photo of me and my camera operator on the camera dolly with George doing the grip's job and pushing it because he said, he always wanted a real job." Filming took three weeks. "We're just aiming to make a film that will entertain people for 75 minutes or so," said Suess.
