= Candida (1961 TV film) =

Television play by the BBC

- Genre: Comedy drama
- Created by: George Bernard Shaw
- Based on: Candida
- Written by: George Bernard Shaw
- Directed by: Naomi Capon
- Starring: Wendy Craig; Patrick Allen; Peter McEnery; Peter Sallis; Rosamund Greenwood; Michael Brennan
- Theme music composer: John Hotchkis
- Composer: John Hotchkis
- Country of origin: United Kingdom

Production
- Producer: Naomi Capon
- Running time: 90 Minutes
- Production company: BBC

Original release
- Network: BBC Television
- Release: 29 December 1961

Candida is a 1961 TV play starring Wendy Craig, Patrick, Peter McEnery, Peter Sallis, Rosamund Greenwood, Michael Brennan. The movie is based on George Bernard Shaw's play of the same name. It was made by the BBC, produced in black and white and broadcast on 29 December 1961 on BBC Television.

== Plot ==
Candida a sensible wife has a husband named Reverend James Mavor Morrell, a clergyman who works at the Church of England with Reverend Alexander Mill and Miss Proserpine Garnett. However Reverend James Mavor Morrell starts to take his wife Candida for granted, but Candida has a young admirer named Eugene Marchbanks who doesn't. Eugene Marchbanks who is a young poet wants to rescue Candida. Both Morrell and Marchbanks end up arguing with each other and soon both of them ask Candida who she should pick to be with. After some thinking Candida eventually chooses her husband Reverend James Mavor Morrell after recognising where her strength is truly needed.

== Cast ==
- Wendy Craig as Candida
- Patrick Allen as Reverend James Mavor Morrell
- Peter McEnery as Eugene Marchbanks
- Peter Sallis as Reverend Alexander Mill
- Rosamund Greenwood as Miss Proserpine Garnett
- Michael Brennan as Mr Burgess

== Reception ==
The play made its debut on BBC Television on 29 December 1961 at 9:25 pm. The play is available to watch for public viewings at the British Film Institute.

== Candida BBC archive holding ==
Candida 1961 is also notable for being the fifth time the BBC had adapted the play for television, as well as the only one that has managed to survive in the BBC Archives.The 1939, 1946, 1950, 1955 and 1971 adaptations of Candida that the BBC made are all believed now to be lost making the 1961 version the only one that has survived in the BBC Archives.
