= Diane Todd =

British-born actress and singer

- Born: 4 June 1937; Edinburgh, Scotland
- Died: 18 April 2010 (aged 72); Kent, England
- Citizenship: British and South African (dual)
- Occupation: Actress
- Spouses: Douglas Major Cullinan (m. 1965–1975): Robin Dolton
- Children: 1 daughter; Angelique Cullinan

Diane Todd (4 June 1937 – 18 April 2010) was a British-born and South African naturalized stage, film, television and stage actress and singer. She is best known for her illustrious stage career.

== Personal life ==
Todd was born in Edinburgh and at the age of ten, she moved with her family to London where her father, Eric continued a music career, joining the Billy Ternent Orchestra and appearing on BBC radio.

She later married the diamond heir, Douglas Cullinan, great-grandson of Thomas Cullinan. The couple settled in Cullinan's native South Africa in 1965. The couple separated but later reunited. In 1975, Cullinan died of a heart attack. Todd later married a fellow stage actor, Robin Dolton. They were in the midst of getting a divorce when Dolton died during their legal proceedings.

In 2000, she announced her engagement to Andrew Finlay in the Port Elizabeth press. She was soon alerted by her fiancé's ex-wives and creditors that he had used a false name and lied about his profession and background. Todd later left South Africa and settled in England in 2007. She died of leukemia on 18 April 2010.

== Career ==
Todd received singing lessons from Harold Miller, the voice coach for Julie Andrews and Shirley Bassey. She would make her West End debut at 16 in A Girl Called Jo. In 1956 she performed in the original 1956 Broadway production of My Fair Lady and in the Drury Lane and Johannesburg productions. She later had the honour of an American national holiday in her name, with the Diane Todd/Eliza Doolittle Day when she took on the Doolittle role in 1959. She played Doolittle in a touring production across the United States, Canada and South Africa.

She appeared in major South African productions of famous musicals such as Guys & Dolls, Kiss Me, Kate, Daddy Long Legs, Stop the World I Want to Get Off and The Merry Widow.

=== Filmography ===
Film and television
Year	Title	Role	Notes
1957	O.S.S.	Girl Singer	1 episode; Operation Barbecue
1957	Dixon of Dock Green	Dor	1 episode; Rock, Rattle and Roll
1958	Six-Five Special	Anne	
1958	Castle Dangerous	Lady Anne	TV film
1958	The Dickie Henderson Half-Hour		Episode 1.3
1962	Two Guys Abroad		
