= Jennifer Daniel =

Welsh actress (1936–2017)

- Born: Jennifer Ruth Williams; 23 May 1936; Pontypool, Wales, UK
- Died: 16 August 2017 (aged 81); Clapham, London, England, UK
- Occupation: Actress
- Spouse: Dinsdale Landen (m. 1959; died 2003)

Jennifer Daniel (born Jennifer Ruth Williams; 23 May 1936 – 16 August 2017) was a Welsh actress. Her film appearances included assorted roles in the Edgar Wallace Mysteries film series, Gideon's Way, the Francis Durbridge serial A Man Called Harry Brent (1965) and the Hammer horror films Kiss of the Vampire (1963) and The Reptile (1966).

She played Mrs. Linton in the 1992 film Emily Brontë's Wuthering Heights. Her television credits include Barnaby Rudge, ITV Play of the Week, Barlow, General Hospital, Rumpole of the Bailey, Public Eye and The Collectors.

== Personal life ==
Daniel was born in Pontypool, South Wales, and she was a student at the Central School of Speech in London. She was married to actor Dinsdale Landen from 1959 until his death in 2003. Jennifer Daniel died on 16 August 2017 at the age of 81 in Clapham, London.

== Sources ==
- Kinsey, Wayne A. Hammer Films: The Bray Studios Years (Reynolds & Hearn, 2002)
