= Norman Priggen =

British film producer and film director

Norman Priggen (7 July 1924 in London – December 1999 in Uckfield, East Sussex) was a British film producer and assistant film director. He was an assistant director on Kind Hearts and Coronets (1949). As a producer he is best remembered for his work with Joseph Losey in the 1960s and early 1970s. Among his production credits are The Cruel Sea (1953), The Professionals (1960), Payroll (1961), The Servant (1963), King & Country (1964), Accident (1967), Secret Ceremony (1968), The Go-Between (1971), Black Gunn (1972), The Assassination of Trotsky (1972), Tales That Witness Madness (1973), and Freddie as F.R.O.7 (1992).
