= Barry Warren =

English actor (1933–1994)

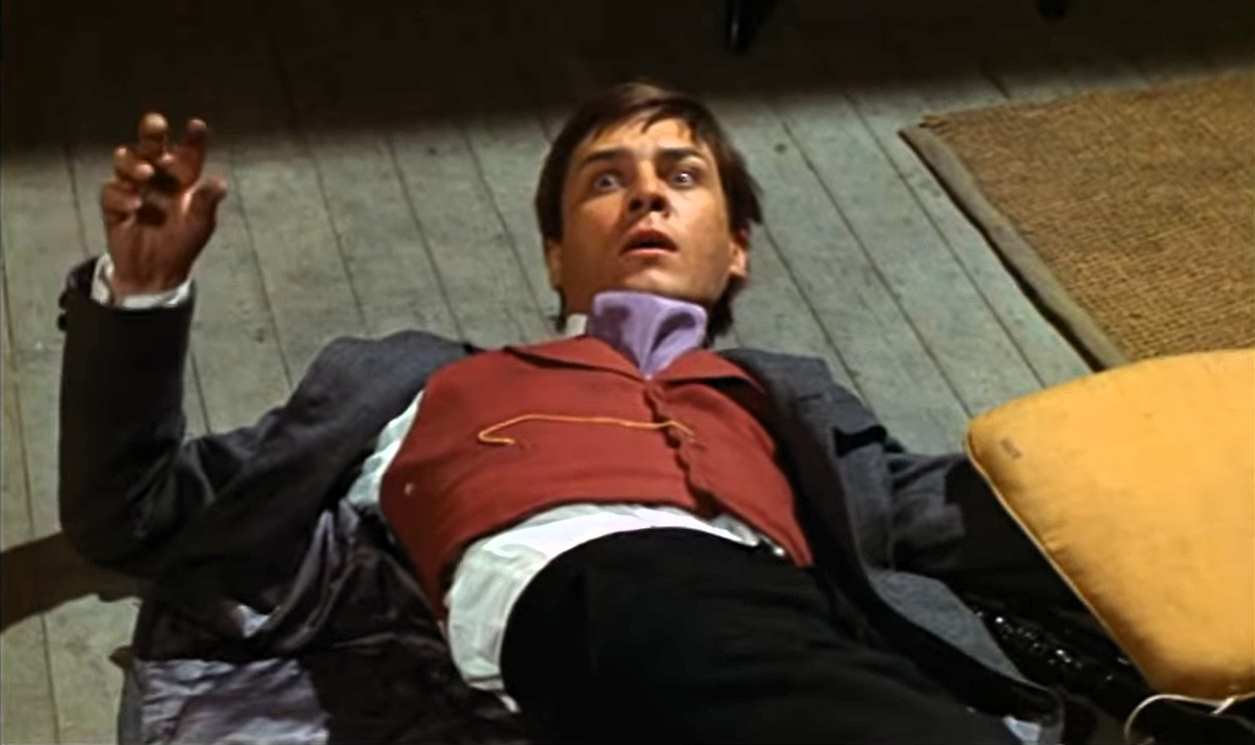
- Warren in Frankenstein Created Woman (1967)
- Born: Barry Christopher J. Warren; 12 July 1933; London, England
- Died: 22 February 1994 (aged 60); Chichester, Sussex, England
- Occupation: Actor

Barry Warren (12 July 1933 — 22 February 1994) was a British actor, born as Barry Christopher J. Warren. He trained at RADA, graduating in 1955. As well as several stage and TV appearances, including one episode of the sci-fi drama Undermind (1965) for ABC Weekend Television, he played three major characters for Hammer Film Productions: Carl Ravna in Kiss of the Vampire (1963); Don Manuel Rodríguez de Sevilla in The Devil-Ship Pirates (1963); and Karl in Frankenstein Created Woman (1967).

== Filmography ==
Year	Title	Role	Notes
1962	Lawrence of Arabia	Two British Officers / Arab Sheik	Uncredited
1963	Kiss of the Vampire	Carl Ravna	
1964	The Devil-Ship Pirates	Don Manuel Rodríguez de Sevilla	
1964	Do You Know This Voice?	Det. Sgt. Connor	
1967	Frankenstein Created Woman	Karl	

== Television ==
Year	Title	Role	Episode
1965	The Avengers	Jeremy Wade	Too Many Christmas Trees
1968	The Avengers	Melville	False Witness
