= Tales That Witness Madness =

- Theatrical Film Poster
- Directed by: Freddie Francis
- Written by: Jennifer Jayne (as Jay Fairbank)
- Produced by: Norman Priggen
- Starring: Donald Pleasence; Joan Collins; Kim Novak; Jack Hawkins
- Cinematography: Norman Warwick
- Edited by: Bernard Gribble
- Music by: Bernard Ebbinghouse
- Production company: World Film Services
- Distributed by: Paramount Pictures
- Release date: 31 October 1973
- Running time: 90 minutes
- Country: United Kingdom
- Language: English

Tales That Witness Madness is a 1973 British anthology horror film directed by Freddie Francis and starring Donald Pleasence, Joan Collins, Kim Novak and Jack Hawkins. It was written by actress Jennifer Jayne (as Jay Fairbank) and produced by Norman Priggen.

The film was one of several in a series of anthology films made during the 1960s and 1970s which included Dr. Terror's House of Horrors (1965), Torture Garden (1967), The House That Dripped Blood (1970), Asylum (1972), Tales from the Crypt (1972), The Vault of Horror (1973) and From Beyond the Grave (1974). These portmanteau horror films were all produced by Amicus Productions. Tales That Witness Madness is sometimes mistaken for an Amicus production; however, it was actually produced by World Film Services.

== Plot ==
In the clinic link episodes, Dr Tremayne, a psychiatrist in a modern mental asylum, reveals to colleague Dr. Nicholas that he has solved four special cases. Tremayne explains the case histories of patients Paul, Timothy, Brian, and Auriol, presenting each in turn to Nicholas:

In "Mr Tiger", Paul is the sensitive and introverted young son of constantly bickering parents Sam and Fay Patterson. Amid the unhappy domestic situation, Paul befriends an "imaginary" tiger.

In "Penny Farthing", antique store owner Timothy stocks a strange portrait of "Uncle Albert" and a penny-farthing bicycle he has inherited from his aunt. In a series of episodes, Uncle Albert compels Timothy to mount the bicycle, and he time travels to an earlier era, where he courts Beatrice, who was young Albert's love interest. These travels place Timothy's girlfriend Ann in peril.

In "Mel", Brian Thompson brings home an old dead tree, which he lovingly calls Mel, mounting it in his modern home as a bizarre piece of found object art. He increasingly shows unusual attention to Mel, angering his jealous wife Bella.

In "Luau", an ambitious literary agent, Auriol Pageant, lasciviously courts new client Kimo; he shows more interest in her beautiful young daughter Ginny. Auriol plans a sumptuous luau for him; when the plans fall through, Kimo's associate Keoki takes over. The luau, as organised by Keoki, is actually a ceremony to assure Kimo's dying mother Malia passage to heaven by appeasing a Hawaiian god, and a requirement is that he consume the flesh of a virgin: Ginny.

In the epilogue, Tremayne watches as manifestations of the patients' histories materialise. Nicholas cannot see the manifestations and has Tremayne declared insane, apparently for believing the patients' bizarre accounts. Nicholas enters the patient holding area, and is killed by "Mr Tiger".

== Cast ==
Segment "Clinic Link Episodes"

- Jack Hawkins as Dr Nicholas
- Donald Pleasence as Dr Tremayne
- Charles Gray as Nicholas (segment "Clinic Link Episodes") (voice) (uncredited)

Segment "Mr Tiger"

- Georgia Brown as Fay
- Donald Houston as Sam
- Russell Lewis as Paul
- David Wood as Tutor

Segment "Penny Farthing"

- Suzy Kendall as Ann Beatrice
- Peter McEnery as Timothy
- Neil Kennedy as 1st removal man
- Richard Connaught as 2nd removal man
- Beth Morris as Polly
- Frank Forsyth as Uncle Albert

Segment "Mel"

- Joan Collins as Bella
- Michael Jayston as Brian

Segment "Luau"

- Kim Novak as Auriol
- Michael Petrovitch as Kimo
- Mary Tamm as Ginny
- Lesley Nunnerley as Vera
- Leon Lissek as Keoki
- Zohra Sehgal as Malia (as Zohra Segal)

== Production ==
Tales That Witness Madness was filmed at Shepperton Studios on 35 mm, with an aspect ratio of 1.85:1. It was the last film of Frank Forsyth, who appears as Uncle Albert. Jack Hawkins died shortly after his scenes were filmed. Hawkins had had his larynx removed in an operation in 1966, and here his voice was dubbed by Charles Gray in post-production. Tales That Witness Madness was Hawkins's final film appearance.

Kim Novak broke a four-year hiatus from films with her appearance in Tales. She replaced Rita Hayworth shortly after production started.

Freddie Francis said "we made this film which I took it as far away from horror as I could, because it really wasn't a horror film." However, when Frank Yablans, who financed, saw it, he said "well it's not a horror film. I said well it wasn't a horror script. He said 'Oh Jesus I don't read scripts.' So I don't know where you go from there. So we then had to shoot for another few days to try and make a non-horror film into a horror film. It still wasn't a bad film though."

== Reception ==
Variety wrote: "Freddie Francis, as usual, directs with flair, economy and effect. ... Episodic films are generally jinxed at the b.o., but perhaps among the popcorn and horror buff trade, where the film has its potential, an exception will be proved. ... The guffaw-type humor nuggets come from a style that is not camp, but instead a dead-pan rendition of non-sequiturs and improbabilities. Thus, the audience's sense of humor is being tested, not that of the filmmakers."

In Offbeat: British Cinema's Curiosities, Obscurities and Forgotten Gems, David Sutton wrote: "The opening titles come on like a cut price Bond movie, with X-ray skulls (instead of silhouette girls) suggesting that we're going on a journey into the unexplored recesses of the human mind ... The film pinches the established Amicus formula of four linked stories played out by a cast of British stalwarts and some international names, and there's not a little resemblance to Amicus's own and far better remembered Asylum (1972)."

The Encyclopedia of Horror writes that the film "avoids farce and develops a nicely deadpan style of humour which is ably sustained by the excellent cast in which only Novak appears unable to hit the right note."

In Nightmare Movies, Kim Newman dismissed the film as a "cheap imitation" that "ripped off" Amicus' anthology films.
