= The Famous Five (1978 TV series) =

British children's TV series (1978–1979)

- Genre: Adventure, Children's
- Written by: Enid Blyton
- Starring: Michele Galagher, Marcus Harris, Gary Russell, Jennifer Thanisch
- Theme music composer: Rob Andrews, Les Spurr
- Country of origin: United Kingdom
- Original language: English
- No. of series: 2
- No. of episodes: 26

Production
- Producers: Don Leaver, Sidney Hayers
- Camera setup: Multiple-camera setup
- Running time: 25 minutes
- Production companies: Southern Television; Portman Productions

Original release
- Network: ITV
- Release: 3 July 1978 – 8 August 1979

Related
- The Famous Five (1995 TV series); Famous 5: On the Case; The Famous Five (2023 TV series)

The Famous Five is a British television series based on the children's books of the same name by Enid Blyton. It was broadcast on ITV over two series in 1978 and 1979. It was produced by Southern Television in 26 half-hour episodes.

== Cast ==
- Michele Galagher as George
- Marcus Harris as Julian
- Gary Russell as Dick
- Jennifer Thanisch as Anne
- Toddy (a Border Collie) as Timmy the Dog
- Michael Hinz as Uncle Quentin
- Susanne Best as Aunt Fanny
- Friedrich von Thun as Rogers

== Production ==
Production for the series began in 1977, with filming commencing during the summer of that year. The series was produced by Southern Television in a co-production with a German company also for the German Television Network ZDF. The episodes were recorded on location and on film (rather than the more usual video tape), making it the most expensive children's television series ever produced at that point. Each story was adapted from one of the original novels and featured the same main characters; George, Julian, Dick, Anne and Timmy the dog.

The first series was produced by Don Leaver, while the second was produced by Sidney Hayers. The executive producer was James Gatward. The stories were adapted for television by a number of writers and directors and starred many notable actors in guest appearances including Patrick Troughton, Cyril Luckham, Brenda Cowling, Geoffrey Bayldon, Brian Glover, Ronald Fraser and an early appearance by Rupert Graves.

The television scripts were amended slightly from the books to give them a contemporary, 1970s setting, with the actors wearing contemporary fashions, such as jeans, polo shirts and Speedos, instead of 1950s style clothing as described in the books. Of the original 21 novels, three were never adapted: Five on a Treasure Island and Five Have a Mystery to Solve because the Children's Film Foundation still had the film and TV rights to the books, while Five Have Plenty of Fun didn't fit in the production schedule. Due to the success of the series, Southern Television were keen to make another season of episodes, but the Enid Blyton estate forbade them to create original stories. One criticism of the series was that many of the episodes featured scenes set at night-time which were badly lit to the point that it was difficult to see what was happening. These scenes were actually shot in daylight, but a heavy filter was placed over the camera to give the impression of darkness. The series was filmed mostly on location in the New Forest and partly in Christchurch, with many of the indoor scenes filmed in Exbury House, where the house doubled as many different dwellings.

The title song was the only original composition by Rob Andrews (music) and Les Spurr (lyrics). The incidental music was mainly taken from library music and from Drama Montage vol 1 & 2 by Brian Bennett.

== Broadcast ==
The Famous Five was first broadcast on ITV on Monday 3 July 1978 at 4:45 pm. This was a year after it had been filmed and during production of the second series. The first episode was Five Go to Kirren Island (an incorrect spelling of Kirrin), although it was not the first episode filmed (Five Go to Mystery Moor). The first series proved popular and, to capitalise on its success, the first six episodes of the second series (which had been filmed in the summer of 1978) were broadcast on Sundays in November and December. The remaining seven episodes of the second series were broadcast on Wednesdays from June to August 1979 (again, a year after production). The Famous Five was sold to many overseas countries such as Ireland (where it was repeated in 1981, 1983 and 1985), Canada and Australia and was dubbed into many languages for the European market such as German (the series having been part-financed by a German company), French, Italian and Spanish.

The series made its Australian debut on ABC television on Tuesday 22 May 1979 at 5:30 pm, with the remainder of the first series screened on weekday evenings from that date, concluding on Thursday 7 June. The second series premiered in Australia, again on ABC, on Tuesday 4 March 1980 at 5:00 pm, as part of an afternoon line-up of children's programming, with new episodes following weekly until 27 May, though transmitted in a different order to the original UK broadcast. These were immediately followed by a repeat of the first series. Episodes from both series were regularly repeated in similar afternoon time-slots on the ABC in the early-to-mid-1980s, before moving to a morning time-slot. The series was still being repeated as late as 1989.

The series spawned many merchandise items such as jigsaws and annuals, while Look-in magazine ran a picture-strip story each week for nearly two years. The theme music (contrary to popular belief, not sung by the cast but by the Corona Stage Academy choir) was released as a single in 1978, but failed to chart.

The scriptwriters who adapted Enid Blyton's books for the first series (of thirteen episodes) were Richard Sparks, Gail Renard, Richard Carpenter and Gloria Tors.

== Episodes ==
=== Series One ===
- Five Go to Kirrin Island: Part 1 (Original transmission: 3 July 1978)
- Five Go to Kirrin Island: Part 2 (10 July 1978)
- Five Go Adventuring Again (17 July 1978)
- Five Go to Smuggler's Top: Part 1 (24 July 1978)
- Five Go to Smuggler's Top: Part 2 (31 July 1978)
- Five Go Off in a Caravan (7 August 1978)
- Five Go Off to Camp: Part 1 (14 August 1978)
- Five Go Off to Camp: Part 2 (21 August 1978)
- Five on a Hike Together (4 September 1978)
- Five Go to Mystery Moor (11 September 1978)
- Five on a Secret Trail (8 September 1978)
- Five Go to Billycock Hill (25 September 1978)
- Five on Finniston Farm (2 October 1978)

=== Series Two ===
- Five Get into Trouble - Prisoners (19 November 1978)
- Five Get into Trouble - Conspiracies (26 November 1978)
- Five Get into a Fix (3 December 1978)
- Five Are Together Again: Part 1 (10 December 1978)
- Five Are Together Again: Part 2 (17 December 1978)
- Five Have a Wonderful Time (31 December 1978)
- Five Fall into Adventure: Part 1 (27 June 1979)
- Five Fall into Adventure: Part 2 (4 July 1979)
- Five Run Away Together (11 July 1979)
- Five Go to Demon's Rocks: Part 1 (18 July 1979)
- Five Go to Demon's Rocks: Part 2 (25 July 1979)
- Five Go Down to the Sea: Part 1 (1 August 1979)
- Five Go Down to the Sea: Part 2 (8 August 1979)

== Aftermath ==
Despite Southern Television's wishes to continue the series, no further episodes were made due to the Blyton estate's veto on the writing of new stories, although a new set of novels were published in France in 1981. The four starring actors met up again in 1980 for a newspaper story on their progressing careers. By this time, only Gary Russell was continuing an acting career and he, too, soon gave it up. This was the last time the four met up although Russell, Harris and Thanisch have met a number of times since for interviews.

- Jenny Thanisch (b. 24 April 1964) later worked as a school teacher in the south of England.
- Gary Russell (b. 18 September 1963) gave up acting in the mid-1980s to concentrate on writing, as well as being the editor of several magazines. He was the script editor on the successful 2005 revival of Doctor Who.
- Marcus Harris (b. 19 April 1964) embarked on a number of business ventures and later became a town councillor. Harris returned in a small cameo role in a German film based on the series titled Famous Five (Fünf Freunde), which was released in January 2012.
- Michele Galagher (4 April 1964 – 30 January 2001), who played the part of George Kirrin, disappeared from the public eye following the cancellation of the series. She died by suicide in 2001. In 2006, rumours began circulating on the Enid Blyton Society website that Gallagher had died. In an interview for the German tabloid Bild-Zeitung in January 2012, Marcus Harris confirmed that Galagher had died "a couple of years ago", though he gave no specific information as to the circumstances of her death, nor the exact date.
- Toddy Woodgate the dog died shortly after filming was completed on the series.
- Michael Hinz (b. 28 December 1939 d. 6 November 2008) who played Uncle Quentin, returned to Germany where he continued to act until his death, aged 68.
- Sue Best (b. 21 April 1943) was Aunt Fanny and her last appearance on TV was in Rosemary and Thyme in 2004.

In 1996 the books were adapted again for another British television adaptation by Harlech Television (HTV) and Tyne Tees Television. This time, unlike the 1970s series, it was set in the 1950s. More recently, an animated version was made by the French company Marathon, which featured the children of the Famous Five.

For many years, the series was not released on DVD due to confusion over the ownership of rights to the television episodes, as well as complexities with the Enid Blyton estate. However, in October 2010, distributor Koch Media remastered the whole series and released it in Germany on Region 2 in a seven-disc DVD set (and on three Blu-ray Discs, respectively) with extensive bonus material including an interview with original cast members and their German counterparts who provided the voices for the German dubbed version. France followed in November 2011 with two 3-DVD sets (but only with the French dubbed version and no bonus material), whilst the complete series was finally released on DVD in the UK in June 2012 by Koch Media. A new 45-minute interview (recorded earlier in 2012) with the original cast is featured on one of the Series 1 DVDs.

The series saw a previous DVD release in Australia in 2005 by Reel Corporation, when the company released this version with images from the 1995–1997 version (the "Five on a Treasure Island" episode from that version was also included). The set was soon corrected (as a "revised edition") with images from the 1978 series, and reissued again in 2011. The series was previously made available on ITVX, formerly known as the British version of Britbox.
