= Jules Verne's Rocket to the Moon =

1967 British film by Don Sharp

- UK cinema poster
- Directed by: Don Sharp
- Written by: Dave Freeman
- Based on: original story by Harry Alan Towers (as "Peter Welbeck") "inspired by the writings of Jules Verne"
- Produced by: Harry Alan Towers
- Starring: Burl Ives; Terry-Thomas; Troy Donahue; Gert Fröbe; Hermione Gingold; Lionel Jeffries; Dennis Price; Daliah Lavi
- Narrated by: Maurice Denham
- Cinematography: Reginald H. Wyer
- Edited by: Ann Chegwidden
- Music by: John Scott
- Production company: Jules Verne Films
- Distributed by: AIP (US); Warner-Pathé (UK)
- Release date: 13 July 1967 (UK)
- Running time: 117 min
- Country: United Kingdom
- Language: English
- Budget: $3 million

Jules Verne's Rocket to the Moon (U.S. title: Those Fantastic Flying Fools; also known as Chiflados Del Espacio, Blast-off, and Rocket to the Moon) is a 1967 British science fiction comedy film directed by Don Sharp and starring Burl Ives, Troy Donahue, Gert Fröbe and Terry-Thomas.

It was released in the U.S. as Those Fantastic Flying Fools, in order to capitalise on the success of Those Magnificent Men in their Flying Machines two years earlier. Director Don Sharp shot second unit on Magnificent Men.

== Plot ==
In Victorian England, everyone is trying to make new scientific discoveries, including such failures as the Duke of Barset's attempt to create the first house in England illuminated by electricity (leading to its going up in flames), Sir Charles Dillworthy's suspension bridge (which falls apart directly as Queen Victoria cuts its inaugural ribbon) and, in Germany, the disastrous recoil of Siegfried von Bulow's powerful new explosive (which is intended to require only a minute quantity). In the US, meanwhile, when Phineas T. Barnum's "Greatest Show on Earth" burns to the ground, he heads to England with his star, General Tom Thumb.

Barnum and Thumb are invited to a scientific lecture by Von Bulow who proposes the idea of sending a projectile to the Moon using his powerful new explosive. Von Bulow is ridiculed, but Barnum thinks the idea has the potential to make him money. He sets about finding the financial backing in order to build a giant cannon to fire the projectile, carrying a reluctant Tom Thumb.

The project attracts investment from all over the world; however, the spaceship designed by Sir Charles Dillworthy proves useless since it does not provide a means for returning to Earth.

Barnum then meets an American aeronaut, Gaylord Sullivan, who has run off with his girlfriend, Madelaine, on her wedding day to another man, the wealthy Frenchman Henri. Upon arriving in Wales and meeting Barnum, Gaylord claims that he has designed a projectile equipped with round-trip rockets. Henri offers to finance Gaylord's missile if he agrees to take Tom Thumb's place. Meanwhile, Dillworthy and his shady brother-in-law, Harry Washington-Smythe, who have already embezzled most of Barnum's funds, immediately plot to sabotage Gaylord's flight in order to win large wagers on the failure of the moonship expedition.

When Madelaine discovers their plan, she is kidnapped and taken off to Angelica's Home for Wayward Girls. She escapes, however, and arrives back at the launching pad, located on a mountain in Wales, just as unconscious Gaylord is being removed from the sabotaged moonship.

Dillworthy, Washington-Smythe, and a Russian spy, Bulgeroff (who rendered Gaylord unconscious), sneak into the spaceship to continue their sabotage. Bulgeroff pulls the takeoff lever, and the three men are sent soaring on a one-way trip thanks to Von Bulow explosive.

They land in what is presumably barren wasteland to find inhabitants singing in Russian. The befuddled Washington-Smythe can only conclude that the Russians are already on the Moon; Washington-Smythe and Dillworthy find themselves as part of the Burlak work brigade hauling barges under the knout of the foreman (Bulgeroff) to the tune of The Song of the Volga Boatmen.

== Main cast ==
- Burl Ives as Phineas T. Barnum
- Troy Donahue as Gaylord Sullivan
- Gert Fröbe as Professor Siegfried von Bulow
- Hermione Gingold as Angelica
- Lionel Jeffries as Sir Charles Dillworthy
- Dennis Price as The Duke of Barset
- Daliah Lavi as Madelaine
- Terry-Thomas as Captain Sir Harry Washington-Smythe
- Stratford Johns as Royal Engineer Sergeant
- Graham Stark as Bertram Grundle
- Renate von Holt as Anna Lindstrom
- Jimmy Clitheroe as General Tom Thumb
- Judy Cornwell as Lady Electra
- Joachim Teege as Joachim Bulgeroff
- Edward de Souza as Henri
- Joan Sterndale-Bennett as Queen Victoria
- Allan Cuthbertson as Colonel Scuttling
- Hugh Walters as Carruthers
- Derek Francis as Puddleby
- Anthony Woodruff as Announcer

== Production ==
Towers (as "Peter Welbeck") devised the story, very loosely based on the 1865 novel From the Earth to the Moon by Jules Verne, whilst the script was by Dave Freeman, a comedy writer for The Benny Hill Show. Don Sharp, who eventually directed the film, said Freeman's original script was "glorious" which encouraged Towers to make an all-star film.

The film was originally announced as going to star Bing Crosby as Phineas T. Barnum and Senta Berger, along with Terry-Thomas, Gert Fröbe and Wilfred Hyde-White. AIP said it would be a "wild adventure laced with comedy." In the end Lionel Jeffries replaced Hyde-White and Burl Ives and Daliah Lavi stood in for Crosby and Berger.

"The cast just grew and grew," recalled Sharp, "so the cost became bigger than the original budget." Sharp says this meant the script was rewritten to accommodate stars who could raise finance. He said what had been "a glorious, tight 100 minutes of comedy grew and grew and it got unwieldy."

The film was almost entirely shot in Ireland starting 6 August 1966. The rocket launch was shot at the site of a disused copper mine in Avoca in Co.Wicklow, other exterior scenes were shot in the sand dunes of Brittas Bay, and the interior scenes were shot at Ardmore Studios, just south of Dublin.

Director Don Sharp who had made several films for the producer Harry Alan Towers recalled that the film was Towers' most expensive. Attempting to obtain more funds for the projected US$3 million budget, Towers approached several international film studios who planned to release the films in their home countries; Constantin Film in West Germany, Anglo-Amalgamated in Great Britain and American International Pictures in the United States of America. In exchange, each of the film studios provided funds with the provisos that their national stars of Gert Fröbe, Terry-Thomas and Troy Donohue received more screen time expanding the originally much tighter screenplay. Sharp did say the shoot was pleasant experience.

== Release ==
=== British release ===
During production, the film was known as Jules Verne's Rocket to the Moon, but when it was screened by the British censors on 21 February 1967, it was registered as Rocket to the Moon (unusually, it was presented to the BBFC by the producer, Harry Towers, instead of the distribution company, which indicates that no distribution deal had been struck at the time). However, by the time it was released, on 13 July 1967, it was once again known as Jules Verne's Rocket to the Moon.

The Times' reviewer, Michael Billington, was not impressed:

"Inspired by Jules Verne", the credits for this film rather cryptically announce. One can't argue with the credits, of course; but a more instantly recognizable inspiration is that brand of screen comedy that assumes that a large gathering of well-known names plus some vintage piece of machinery (a car for preference, but a plane or rocket will do) adds up to irresistible mirth. But, as this film takes nearly two hours to demonstrate, it's no use cramming the cast with comedy actors if you're not going to give them anything very funny to do.

=== US release ===
In the United States, the film was first released by American International Pictures in Los Angeles on 26 July 1967 as Those Fantastic Flying Fools, in order to capitalise on the success of Those Magnificent Men in Their Flying Machines (1965), which also starred Terry-Thomas and Gert Fröbe, and where the director Don Sharp was responsible for the aerial sequences. However, it wasn't the hit that the distributors expected, so it was cut down to 95 minutes and released as Blast-Off elsewhere in the US – but that version was no success either.

The Los Angeles Times said the film had a "leisurely, not to say soporific pace... it takes its time which is risky in a slapstick enterprise. Still it does retain an easy sauntering tone of amiable nonsense, with enough pratfalls and explosions to keep the small fry happy." The New York Times said "it's all been done before, and better, but there are still some smiles."

== See also ==
- First Men in the Moon (1964 film)
