= Fella Edmonds =

British actor (born 1941)

Fella Edmonds (born 25 October 1941), also known as Eddie Edmonds, is a British child actor of film and television.

== Life ==
Edmonds was born on 25 October 1941 in Chiswick.

His early promise as Georgie Crain, the principal figure in The Rainbow Jacket, failed to land him any further leading roles other than in a Children's Film Foundation film, The Stolen Airliner, the following year. Although his small size (and confidence) allowed him to play a jockey, he grew up to be 6 feet 1 inch tall.

He had no film roles as an adult.

== Known roles ==
- To the Rescue (1952, short)
- Paradise Island (1954, TV series), appeared in five out of the six episodes as Don Gurney
- The Rainbow Jacket (1954), as Georgie Crain, the main character
- Whistle for Silence (1954), as boy
- Hand in Glove (1955, TV movie), as Peter
- The Stolen Airliner (1955), as Fred
- The Right Answers (1955, TV movie), as Christopher Wright
- Supersonic Saucer (1956), as Rodney
- Calling All Boys (1956, TV series), as Bill
