= The Collectors (TV series) =

Television series

- Starring: Peter McEnery; Michael Billington; Pierre Vaneck
- Country of origin: United Kingdom
- Original language: English
- No. of series: 1
- No. of episodes: 10

Production
- Production locations: Poole, Weymouth
- Running time: 50 minutes

Original release
- Network: BBC1
- Release: 1 March – 3 May 1986

The Collectors is a British television drama about Her Majesty's Customs and Excise in the fictional Dorset town of Wrelling. Produced by the BBC, one series of 10 episodes was first shown in 1986.

Location scenes were filmed around the English resorts of Poole and Weymouth, in particular featuring the old Poole Customs House on the harbour.

== Regular cast and characters ==
- Peter McEnery as Harry Caines, the new district head of Customs
- Michael Billington as Tom Gibbons, a Customs Officer
- Pierre Vaneck as Charles Thieron, the main malefactor
- Jack McKenzie
- Lois Butlin
- William Whymper
- Robert Burbage
- Jennifer Daniel

== Availability ==
At present the series has not been released on DVD.
