= Linda (1960 film) =

1960 British film by Don Sharp

- Promotional image
- Directed by: Don Sharp
- Written by: Bill MacIlwraith
- Produced by: Leslie Parkyn; Julian Wintle
- Starring: Carol White; Alan Rothwell
- Cinematography: Michael Reed
- Music by: Gary Hughes
- Production company: Independent Artists
- Distributed by: Bryanston Films (UK)
- Release date: November 1960 (UK)
- Running time: 61 minutes
- Country: United Kingdom
- Language: English
- Budget: £22,300

Linda is a 1960 British second feature teen drama film, directed by Don Sharp and starring Carol White and Alan Rothwell. It was written by Bill MacIlwraith.

It was considered a lost film and was on the British Film Institute's "75 Most Wanted" list of missing British feature films, but has now been rediscovered and was shown on Talking Pictures TV in August 2025. Talking Pictures repeated the showing in September 2026.

== Plot ==
Bored south London teenager Phil joins a gang led by the Chief and begins to be drawn into a world of petty crime and violence. When he meets Linda, his interest begins to shift away from the gang and towards her. She tries to pull him away from the gang's bad influence.

The couple go on a day trip to Brighton. On the way home Phil makes a pass at Linda, but is rebuffed as she tells him she is not that kind of girl. Later, the local coffee bar which acts as the gang's territory is threatened by incomers. The Chief musters his minions, and Phil agrees to join in after being duped into thinking that Linda is playing fast and loose with another boy. After the ruck, Phil finds out that he has been tricked by the Chief. Urged by the progressively-minded local vicar, he decides to leave the gang behind. Other members also see the light and join him, leaving the Chief on his own. Phil and Linda discuss the possibility of marriage.

== Cast ==
- Carol White as Linda
- Alan Rothwell as Phil
- Cavan Malone as Chief
- Edward Cast as vicar
- Vivienne Lacey as Rosie
- Lois Daine as Clara
- Larry Dann as Len
- Keith Faulkner as Joe
- Harry Pringle as Fred
- Richard Palmer as Teddy
- Tony Lyons as Dave
- Pearson Dodd as Jack

== Production ==
Don Sharp was offered the job of directing by Independent Artists who were pleased with the work he had just done for them on The Professionals (1960). The film was made for Bryanston Films, and designed to play the bottom half of a double bill. Filming began on 23 May 1960 at Beaconsfield.

The film was shot over 15 days, on location in south London and Brighton. Don Sharp said the key to making a film with such a tight schedule was preplanning. He said, "Obviously you cannot do all the covering that you might on a longer schedule. So you plan to eliminate cover shots wherever possible to give yourself extra time for those sequences where you need them for dramatic cutting."

In her autobiography, White called the film "an unmemorable B flick" in which her character "was a vulnerable, amazingly stupid girl from south of the river". She recalled, "We spent days and days on location at Battersea Fun Fair, the icy wind like cold fingers up my dress as I went from whirlygigs to the big wheel, every shot being repeated until the director managed to film me with a dumb, exhilarated grin and my legs wide open."

Carol White had recently appeared in Never Let Go (1960) but Linda was her first starring role. She later starred in Gaolbreak (1962) which she described as "the story appearing to carry on where Linda had left off."

== Release ==
On its release, it played as the support feature to Saturday Night and Sunday Morning (1960).

== Reception ==
White said the film had "mixed reviews". As a second feature, Linda received only passing attention from contemporary critics.

The Monthly Film Bulletin wrote: "This is a far cry from the ordinary run of teenage stories. Presented with insight, humour and even charm, it is touchingly played by Carol White (Linda), adequately by a long-haired, bootlace-tied and tight-trousered Alan Rothwell (Phil). The script is fresh and sympathetic when it deals with the young couple; elsewhere its details are sometimes hard to swallow. The gang is observed ingenuously, and both the character of the vicar and how the teenagers are wooed away from Chief seem to be offering a somewhat treacly solution to a serious problem. But despite its air of calculation, this is an entertaining little film, and agreeable in its attempt to do something positive and different."

Kine Weekly wrote: "The young players make the most of their slender opportunities, and its London and Brighton settings are authentic, but the tale is dog-eared "paperback" fiction. So-so British "second." ... The picture clearly suggests juvenile delinquency is mainly caused by too much money and leisure, but offers a syrupy solution to a serious problem. Alan Roth who sports long hair, a bootlace tie and tight trousers, looks the part as Phil, and Carol White a peroxide blonde, is also suitably garbed as Linda, but both fight a losing battle with an unimaginative script. The same goes for the rest. The opus neither touches, shocks nor thrills."

The Cinema Exhibitors' Association Report of 18 November 1960 said: "This is an unpretentious but amusing little film which combines action with humour and even some charm."

== See also ==
- List of rediscovered films
