= Peter McEnery =

British actor (born 1940)

- Born: Peter Robert McEnery; 21 February 1940 (age 86); Walsall, Staffordshire, England
- Education: Ellesmere College
- Occupation: Actor
- Years active: 1959–2008
- Spouse(s): Julie Peasgood (divorced, 1 child); Julia St John (2007)
- Relatives: John McEnery (brother)

Peter Robert McEnery (born 21 February 1940) is a retired English stage and film actor.

== Early life ==
McEnery was born in Walsall, Staffordshire, to Charles and Ada Mary (née Brinson) McEnery. He was educated at Ellesmere College, Shropshire.

His younger brothers are actor John and the photographer David.

== Career ==
McEnery appeared in Victim, a 1961 British neo-noir suspense film directed by Basil Dearden in which McEnery plays Barrett, a young working-class gay man who falls prey to blackmailers after he and the titular character are photographed in an intimate embrace. McEnery also starred alongside Hayley Mills in the 1964 film The Moon-Spinners. In 1966, he took the lead in the Disney adventure film The Fighting Prince of Donegal. He had the lead role in the expensive 1970 adventure film The Adventures of Gerard, which flopped.

He played Edwin Clayhanger in the television dramatisation of the novels by Arnold Bennett with support from Janet Suzman, Harry Andrews and Clive Swift. He played Mr Sloane in Entertaining Mr Sloane (1970).

As an actor for the Royal Shakespeare Company, he played the title role in Ron Daniel's 1979 production of Pericles, Prince of Tyre at The Other Place, and played several roles in the 1982 epic production of Nicholas Nickleby for the same company. In 1981, he played Oberon in the BBC Television Shakespeare production of A Midsummer Night's Dream. Another stage role is that of the surgeon Treves in the National Theatre's 1980 production of The Elephant Man.

== Personal life ==
McEnery married Julie Peasgood in 1978. They met in 1975 when she played a maid called Ada in the Clayhanger television series in which McEnery starred. Their daughter Kate was born in 1981. They later divorced. In 2007, he married actress Julia St John.

== Stage credits ==
Year	Title	Role	Theatre
1957	Flowering Cherry	Tom	Theatre Royal Haymarket
1960	Look Homeward, Angel	Eugene Gant	Pembroke Theatre, Croydon
1961	Hamlet	Laertes	Stratford Memorial Theatre
1962	Afore Night Come	Johnny Hobnails	Arts Theatre
1965	The Merchant of Venice	Bassanio	Royal Shakespeare Company
1966	The Jew of Malta	Ithamore	Royal Shakespeare Company
1970	The Merchant of Venice	Director	Gateway Theatre, Chester
1971	Rosencrantz and Guildenstern are Dead	Guildenstern	Nottingham Playhouse
1972	The Shadow of a Gunman	Donal Davoren	Young Vic
1972	Julius Caesar	Cassius	Young Vic
1975	The Sea Gull	Boris Trigorin	Lyric Theatre, London
1976	Romeo and Juliet	Romeo	St. George Theatre
1977	Henry VI, Part 1	Earl of Suffolk	Royal Shakespeare Company
1977	Henry VI, Part 2	Duke of Suffolk	Royal Shakespeare Company
1977	The Lorenzaccio Story	Lorenzo	Royal Shakespeare Company
1977	Sons of Light	Yescanab	Royal Shakespeare Company
1978	As You Like It	Orlando	Royal Shakespeare Company
1978	The Jail Diary of Albie Sachs	Albie Sachs	Royal Shakespeare Company
1979	Pericles	Pericles	Royal Shakespeare Company
1979	Once In a Lifetime	Jerry Hyland	Aldwych Theatre
1980	The Elephant Man	Frederick Treves	Royal National Theatre
1981	Julius Caesar	Julius Caesar	Royal Shakespeare Company
1983	Julius Caesar	Marcus Brutus	Royal Shakespeare Company
1983	The Comedy of Errors	Antipholus of Ephesus	Royal Shakespeare Company
1984	The Devils	De Laubardemont	Barbican Centre
1984	The Devils	Urbain Grandier	Royal Shakespeare Company
1986	Made in Bangkok	Edward Gover	Aldwych Theatre
1987	The Lover & A Slight Ache	Richard (The Lover)	Young Vic
1990	A Little Night Music	Fredrik Egerman	Piccadilly Theatre
1990	A Dream of People	Claude Godber	Royal Shakespeare Company
1991	Cider with Rosie	Narrator/Laurie Lee	Birmingham Repertory Company
1993	A Doll's House	Torvald Helver	Minerva Theatre, Chichester
1994	Dangerous Corner	Robert Caplan	Minerva Theatre, Chichester
1995	Women of Troy	Menelaus	Royal National Theatre
1997	Heartbreak House	Hector Hushabye	Almeida Theatre
2000	Hamlet	Claudius	Royal National Theatre

=== Director ===
Year	Title	Theatre
1970	The Merchant of Venice	Gateway Theatre, Chester
1971	Richard III	Nottingham Playhouse

== Filmography ==
=== Film ===
Year	Title	Role	Notes
1960	Beat Girl	Tony	
1960	Tunes of Glory	David MacKinnon, 2nd Lieutenant	
1961	Victim	Jack "Boy" Barrett	
1964	The Moon-Spinners	Mark Camford	
1966	The Game Is Over	Maxime Saccard	
1966	The Fighting Prince of Donegal	"Red" Hugh O'Donnell	
1967	I Killed Rasputin	Felix Yusupov	
1968	Sleep Is Lovely	Peter	
1968	Negatives	Theo	
1968	Better a Widow	Tom Proby	
1970	The Adventures of Gerard	Col. Etienne Gerard	
1970	Entertaining Mr Sloane	Mr. Sloane	
1970	Atlantic Wall	Jeff	
1973	Tales That Witness Madness	Timothy	Segment: "Penny Farthing"
1975	Footprints on the Moon	Henry	
1978	The Cat and the Canary	Charlie Wilder	
1996	Lucky Punch	Flaherty	

=== Television ===
Year	Title	Role	Notes
1959	The Case of Private Hamp	Lieutenant Johnson, the Junior Member	Television film
1959–60	ITV Television Playhouse	Cy Whelan / George Poddy / Cyril	Episodes: "Promenade" (1959), "The Essay Prize" (1960), "Poor Sidney" (1960)
1959–60	International Detective	Alan Vernon	Episode: "The Rainis Case" (1960)
1960–63	Armchair Theatre	Tom / Stephen Strang	Episodes: "Lena, O My Lena" (1960), "The Chocolate Tree" (1963)
1960–64	ITV Play of the Week	Simon / Captain Richard Travers	Episodes: "The Patchwork Quilt" (1960), "Tarnish on a Golden Boy" (1964)
1961	Candida	Eugene Marchbanks	Television film
1963	Still Life	Barney	Television film
1965	Theatre 625	Teifion	Episode: "Progress to the Park" (1965)
1966	The Magical World of Disney	Hugh O'Donnell / Mark Camford	Documentary
1967	Cinéma	Himself	TV series documentary: episode dated 16 February 1967
1970	Omnibus	Modigliani	TV series documentary: "A Requiem for Modigliani" (1970)
1973	So It Goes	Claude Duchesne	Episode: "Free Fall"
1973	Life and Soul	Nicholas	Television film
1976	Clayhanger	Edwin Clayhanger	22 episodes
1979	The Aphrodite Inheritance	David Collier	8 episodes
1980	Hammer House of Horror	Edwyn	Episode: "The Mark of Satan" (1980)
1981	The Jail Diary of Albie Sachs	Albie Sachs	Television film
1981	A Midsummer Night's Dream	Oberon	Television film
1982	Arena	Mr Sloane	Episode: "A Genius Like Us: A Portrait of Joe Orton" (1982)
1983	Live from Pebble Mill	Dan	Episode: "Japanese Style" (1983)
1983	Pictures	Bill Trench	7 episodes
1984	Weekend Playhouse	Dominic Hanson	Episode: "Change Partners" (1984)
1985	The South Bank Show	2nd Lt. David Mackinnon	Episode: "Sir Alec Guinness" (1985)
1985	Florence Nightingale	Sidney Herbert	Television film
1986	The Collectors	Harry Caines	10 episodes
1987	The Mistress	Luke Mansel	6 episodes
1988	Inspector Morse	Donald Phillipson	Episode: "Last Seen Wearing" (1988)
1989	Awayday	Himself	TV series: Episode #1.4 (1989)
1991	Safari	Dr. Peter Wolff	Television film
1992	Boon	Robert MacGuffin	Episode: "MacGuffin's Transputer" (1992)
1992	Witchcraft	Jamie Matheson	2 episodes
1994	All Quiet on the Preston Front	Fraser	Episodes: "Ally's Husband" (1994), "Kirsty's Biscuit" (1994)
2000	Reach for the Moon	William Martin	6 episodes
2008	Scalp	Coolet	Episodes: "Chute libre" (2008), "St-Martin" (2008), "Peracor" (2008), "Mr Smith?" (2008)
