= Kiss of the Vampire (film) =

1963 film directed by Don Sharp

- US theatrical release poster
- Directed by: Don Sharp
- Written by: John Elder
- Produced by: Anthony Hinds
- Starring: Clifford Evans; Noel Willman; Edward de Souza; Jennifer Daniel; Barry Warren
- Cinematography: Alan Hume
- Edited by: James Needs
- Music by: James Bernard
- Production company: Hammer Film Productions
- Distributed by: Rank Film Distributors (UK)
- Release dates: September 11, 1963 (US); January 26, 1964 (UK)
- Running time: 88 minutes
- Country: United Kingdom
- Language: English

Kiss of the Vampire is a 1963 British vampire horror film from Hammer Film Productions, directed by Don Sharp and starring Clifford Evans, Noel Willman, Edward de Souza, Jennifer Daniel, and Barry Warren. The film follows a honeymooning couple who encounter a cult of vampires in rural Bavaria. The screenplay was written by Anthony Hinds, under the pen name 'John Elder'.

Originally conceived as a sequel in Hammer's Dracula series, the film was retooled into a standalone project. It was the first of several films that Australian director Sharp made for Hammer. Shooting took place at Bray Film Studios.

The film was first released in the United States on 11 September 1963, before being released in Britain on a double-bill with Paranoiac on 26 January 1964. A heavily re-edited version, featuring new scenes with actors Carl Esmond and Virginia Gregg, was later aired on American television under the title Kiss of Evil.

== Plot ==
Gerald and Marianne Harcourt are a couple honeymooning in early 20th-century Bavaria when their car runs out of petrol. They stop in a small village and opt to stay at the local inn until a cart arrives with more petrol. They accept a dinner invitation from Dr. Ravna, who introduces them to his children Carl and Sabena.

At a costume ball at Ravna's chateau, Gerald and Marianne are separated from each other. Donning a mask identical to Gerald's in order to impersonate him, Carl silently leads Marianne to an upstairs bedroom, where Dr. Ravna, a vampire, bites her. Gerald becomes concerned about Marianne's whereabouts, but Sabena gives him a drugged drink which renders him unconscious. Ravna is the leader of a vampire cult which intends to induct Marianne as a member.

When Gerald awakes, Carl insists that he was travelling alone and that Marianne was never in the chateau. The innkeeper, Bruno, supports Carl's story, and the police say that Dr. Ravna's standing in the community is too respected to investigate his chateau. Only the hard-drinking savant Professor Zimmer, who lost his daughter to the cult, acknowledges Marianne's existence and agrees to help. He advises Gerald that the cult will not be able to complete Marianne's transformation into a vampire until the following night, and prepares an arcane ritual using the Seal of Solomon that he can use to destroy the vampires once Marianne is freed.

Gerald knocks at the chateau's front door and knocks out the guard when he answers. He breaks into Tania's bedroom and enlists her help in finding Marianne, but she betrays him to Ravna. Ravna has Gerald tied up and demonstrates to him that they have already brainwashed Marianne into embracing the cult and renouncing her love for Gerald. As Tania scratches Gerald's chest as foreplay to a vampiric bite, he surreptitiously slips his bonds, then uses blood from the scratch to draw a cross on his chest. The vampires reel from the cross, giving Gerald the opportunity to subdue Marianne and escape. The cult searches the grounds for them, but Zimmer provides a distraction which allows Gerald to topple a pillar on the guard.

Back at the inn, Zimmer says he knows Bruno only denied Marianne's existence for fear that the cult would harm his daughter, and compels him to bring the local priest to cure Marianne. As Zimmer works on the ritual, Gerald checks on Marianne and finds she has left, having been mystically summoned by the cult. The cult realizes that Zimmer will not destroy them so long as Marianne is with them. Gerald and the priest catch up to Marianne and tackle her to the ground. Zimmer's arcane ritual is completed, releasing a swarm of vampire bats which swarm over the vampires, draining them of their blood. As the vampires die, Marianne is freed of their spell.

== Cast ==
- Clifford Evans as Professor Zimmer
- Noel Willman as Dr. Ravna
- Edward de Souza as Gerald Harcourt
- Jennifer Daniel as Marianne Harcourt
- Barry Warren as Carl Ravna
- Brian Oulton as First Disciple
- Noel Howlett as Father Xavier
- Jacquie Wallis as Sabena Ravna
- Peter Madden as Bruno
- Isobel Black as Tania
- Vera Cook as Anna
- John Harvey as Police Sergeant

Kiss of Evil cut only

- Carl Esmond as Anton Stangher (TV movie only)
- Virginia Gregg as Rosa Stangher (TV movie only)
- Sheilah Wells as Theresa Stangher (TV movie only)

== Production ==
=== Development ===
The film was originally intended to be the third movie in Hammer's Dracula series, which began with 1958's Dracula with Christopher Lee and Peter Cushing, and was followed by 1960's The Brides of Dracula with Cushing alone. Following the success of Brides of Dracula, Universal agreed to co finance and the film was put on Hammer's schedule in January 1961. Additional finance was to come from Italian producer Roberto Dandi.

However, by the time Anthony Hinds finished his script in 1962, Dracula had been removed from the project and Dandi was not involved. The script involved left over elements from The Brides of Dracula as well as the British thriller So Long at the Fair.

The job of directing was offered to Don Sharp, who later said he had never seen a horror film before being asked to the job by Tony Hinds. Hinds told Sharp he thought the director would be ideal based on Sharp's other work. The director watched The Curse of Frankenstein, Dracula and Stranglers from Bombay and became enthusiastic.

"What intrigued me about them was after about 20 minutes I was totally hooked despite a totally absurd situation," Sharp said later. "I thought it was wonderful - here was a genre with its own ground rules and self contained world and you could be theatrical but treat it realistically to grab the audience and make them believe something absurd."

Sharp said he was worried that "as Hammer progressed, the goal seemed to be for each picture to top the one before it and they were becoming satiated with violence. So I persuaded Tony that it was better to suggest 'Is it going to happen?' and give the audience a little touch of it, and then go on and really get your big shock at the end. There could be a good size shock in the middle too but not all the time."

Sharp said "I've always believed there needs to be a separation between suspense and shock. You lead on a mood but if you introduce the shock moment too quickly then it's expected. If you hang on keeping the same mood and tempo as the rest of the sequence, and then shatter the mood with a sudden violent moment, that's when it really works."

Sharp says the idea that the vampires belonged to a cult came from Hinds. "He persuaded me that it would be great if, instead of just one person, there were a whole lot of people who couldn't come out in the daylight.”

"Not every villain has to be a Bill Sykes," added Sharp. "Some of the most awful corruption has been in the most respectable of places: the old Biblical thing of whited sepulchres that were shining on the outside but absolutely corrupt underneath. Once we had that kind of approach, the whole of the designing and costuming grew from it."

=== Casting ===
The film was made without Hammer's two biggest stars, Peter Cushing and Christopher Lee. Noel Willman, who at the time was better known as a Tony-winning theatre director, was cast as the vampire. Edward de Souza had been in Hammer's Phantom of the Opera.

=== Filming ===
The film went into production on 7 September 1962 at Bray Studios and finished on 25 October.

Sharp enjoyed making the film and later said Tony Hinds was the best producer he ever worked with.

The film's climax, involving black magic and swarms of bats, was intended to be the ending of The Brides of Dracula, but the star of that film, Peter Cushing, objected that Van Helsing would never resort to black sorcery. However, the paperback novelization of Brides does use this ending.

The finale involving the bat attack was shot using plastic bats. "It was a chaotic day shooting that scene, but everyone seemed to believe that we were on to something and people started taking chances and put their all into it," said Sharp. "I'm very proud of it."

== Release ==
When the film was delivered to Universal the studio was concerned about the accidental similarities between the film's ending and that of The Birds. The release of Kiss of the Vampire was delayed in America until September 1963. It was not released in Britain until 1964 when it went out on a double-bill with Paranoiac.

=== Home media ===
In North America, the film was released on 6 September 2005 along with seven other Hammer horror films (The Brides of Dracula, Nightmare, The Evil of Frankenstein, The Curse of the Werewolf, Paranoiac, Night Creatures, The Phantom of the Opera) on the four-DVD set The Hammer Horror Series (ASIN: B0009X770O), which is part of MCA-Universal's Franchise Collection. This set was re-released on Blu-ray on 13 September 2016. In July 2020, Scream Factory released the film with a collector's edition Blu-ray that included both 1.85:1 and 1.66:1 aspect ratios as well as the TV version Kiss of Evil in standard definition.

=== Kiss of Evil version ===
Retitled Kiss of Evil for American TV, Universal trimmed so much of the original film for its initial television screening that more footage had to be shot to fill the missing time, featuring actors Carl Esmond, Virginia Gregg and Sheilah Wells.

Additional characters that didn't appear at all in the original release were added, creating a whole new subplot. Every scene that showed blood was edited out, e.g. the pre-credits scene in which blood gushes from the coffin of Zimmer's daughter after he plunges a shovel into it. Also, in the televised version it is never revealed what Marianne sees behind the curtain (Ravna lying on his bed with blood trickling from the corners of his mouth), a sight which makes her scream. A couple of the cuts result in scenes that no longer make sense: while the theatrical release had Harcourt smearing the blood on his chest into a cross-shaped pattern (keeping the vampires away as he escapes), the televised version omits the blood-smearing, leaving the vampires' inaction unexplained.

The additional footage shot for the televised version revolves around a family, the Stanghers, who argue about the influence of the vampiric Ravna clan but never interact with anybody else in the movie. The teenage daughter, Theresa, throws over her boyfriend in favor of Carl Ravna (unseen in these scenes) who has given her a music box which plays the same hypnotic tune that he plays on the piano elsewhere in the movie.

== Critical reception ==
Howard Thompson of The New York Times wrote, "Until the picture floridly hops off the track toward the end, this horror exercise is a quietly stylish, ice-cold treat, beautifully tinted, well-directed (Don Sharp) and persuasively acted (Edward de Souza and Jennifer Daniel have the leads)."

Variety wrote "Horror fans will dig this latest effort from the Hammer Film shop in Britain. It is a slickly-produced color story of evil doings in Bavaria, circa 1910, replete with suspense, demonism and mystery tightly wrapped in a skillful package of effective performance and well-paced direction."

The Monthly Film Bulletin wrote "No new developments seem to have emerged in the vampire world, and this film is a straightforward and rather tame rehash of the standard formula...The direction is competent enough, though Don Sharp reveals no flair for this kind of thing, and there is a signal lack of atmosphere."

Leslie Halliwell said: "This unsubtle variation on Dracula is handled in lively fashion, with a splendid climax in which assorted white-robed vampires are destroyed by bats."

The Radio Times Guide to Films gave the film 2/5 stars, writing: "Newlyweds honeymooning in Bavaria find themselves up to their necks in vampires in this lesser-known Hammer horror from director Don Sharp. Studio stalwarts Peter Cushing and Christopher Lee are absent here, so it's Clifford Evans (The Curse of the Werewolf) who takes on the mantle of the vampire killer determined to put an end to the evil reign of chief bloodsucker Noel Willman. It's pretty formulaic stuff, but the camerawork (by veteran British cinematographer Alan Hume) at least makes the tale a vivid experience."

The review aggregator Rotten Tomatoes reported an approval rating of 88%, with an average score of 7.2/10, based on 8 reviews.

== Bibliography ==
- Rigby, Jonathan (July 2000). English Gothic : A Century of Horror Cinema. Reynolds & Hearn. ISBN 978-1903111017. OCLC 45576395.
- Koetting, Christopher (1995). "Costume Dramas". Hammer Horror.
