= Interval (play) =

1939 play by Sumner Locke Elliott

- Written by: Sumner Locke Elliott
- Characters: Laura Mannington, actress Terry Cotswald, playwright Marthy, the dresser Joyce Clements
- Original language: English
- Setting: Behind the scenes at the Queen Anne Theatre, London

Premiere
- Date premiered: 1 April 1939
- Place premiered: Independent Theatre, Sydney

Interval is a 1939 play by Sumner Locke Elliott. It was popular and was performed throughout Australia at a time when this was not common for local plays.

The Sydney Morning Herald called it "interesting drama."

The play was published in book form in 1942 by Melbourne University Press It was one of four plays published with the aid of the Commonwealth Literary Fund, the others being Daybreak, Red Sky at Morning and A Touch of Silk. The Sydney Morning Herald said Interval "has some smart repartee and succeeds in showing the deterioration of an actress's character under the influence of success."

Elliott later recalled the play as "an unqualified success, even being revived the following year at North Sydney and I still remember it most fondly partly because of the companionable cast it had and because it contained a showy part for the author. At its second performance all the scenery fell down during the author’s first scene on him."

== Premise ==
The play is set behind the scenes of a long-running stage show in London over a two year period for a play called "Neither Shall They Mourn". Laura Mannington becomes offensive as she reaches fame.

== Radio versions ==
The play was adapted for radio in 1945, 1948 and 1949.
