= The Stolen Airliner =

- Opening titles
- Directed by: Don Sharp
- Written by: Don Sharp; John Pudney
- Based on: novel Thursday Adventure by John Pudney
- Produced by: Howard Thomas
- Starring: Fella Edmonds; Diana Day; Michael Maguire
- Cinematography: Jo Jago
- Edited by: Eily Boland
- Music by: Philip Green
- Production companies: Children's Film Foundation; Associated British Pathé
- Release date: 1955
- Country: United Kingdom
- Language: English

The Stolen Airliner is a 1955 British Children's Film Foundation production, directed by Don Sharp and starring Fella Edmonds, Diana Day and Michael Maguire. It was written by Sharp and John Pudney based on Pudney's 1955 adventure story for boys, Thursday Adventure.

== Premise ==
An international gang of revolutionaries hijack a plane which is being guarded by three young air cadets. The crooks are overpowered in midair, and the Royal Air Force eventually comes to the rescue.

== Cast ==
- Fella Edmonds as Fred
- Diana Day as Anne
- Michael Maguire as John
- Peter Dyneley as Uncle George
- Nicola Braithwaite as Kitty
- Ballard Berkeley as Mr. Head
- Iris Russell as Mrs. Head
- David King-Wood as controller

== Production ==
It was Don Sharp's debut feature film as director, although he had directed some documentaries, following his decision to abandon acting. According to Anthony Hayward the film "demonstrated [Sharp's] ability to keep the action fast-paced". Sharp had written a number of films with John Pudney, whose novel formed the basis for this film. Sharp called it "a very good little action movie".

== Reception ==
The Monthly Film Bulletin wrote: "'The film takes a little time to warm to the excitements of the story, and some of the climaxes are spoilt by poor timing, but once the plot is under way it gets its response from the child audience. No great demands are made on the boy and girl players, who, on the whole, acquit themselves with credit, but the adults are less effective; Uncle George, in particular, plays in a brusque, unsmiling manner which it is hard to believe is attractive to children. The villains are suitably obvious; their excessive ineptitude, however, to some extent weakens the tension at moments of danger. Not the best of the C.F.F. films, it is, nevertheless, a welcome addition to the repertoire of Saturday morning entertainment."
