= Paul Temple Returns =

1952 British film by Maclean Rogers

- Theatrical release poster
- Directed by: Maclean Rogers
- Written by: Francis Durbridge
- Based on: Paul Temple by Francis Durbridge
- Produced by: Ernest G. Roy
- Starring: John Bentley; Patricia Dainton; Peter Gawthorne
- Cinematography: Geoffrey Faithfull
- Edited by: Jim Connock
- Music by: Wilfred Burns
- Production company: Nettlefold Films
- Distributed by: Butcher's Film Service
- Release date: 24 November 1952
- Running time: 71 minutes
- Country: United Kingdom
- Language: English

Paul Temple Returns (U.S. title: Bombay Waterfront ) is a 1952 British second feature ('B') crime film directed by Maclean Rogers and starring John Bentley, Patricia Dainton and Peter Gawthorne. It was written by Francis Durbridge.

It was the fourth and last in the series of Paul Temple films distributed by Butcher's Film Service: the others are Send for Paul Temple (1946) (with Anthony Hulme as Paul Temple), Calling Paul Temple (1948, the first with John Bentley in the title role), and Paul Temple's Triumph (1950).

Aside from Bentley, the other actors in this film are different from those in the earlier films.

== Plot ==
A series of seemingly unconnected murders takes place in London, with the murderer leaving a calling card signed "The Marquess". Aspiring novelist and amateur detective Paul Temple and his wife Steve are called in to investigate. An ancient papyrus scroll recently excavated in Egypt by the menacing archaeologist Sir Felix Raybourne appears to hold the key to the murders. It details an antidote for all narcotic drugs, which if put to use could put an end to lucrative criminal drug cartels in London.

== Cast ==
- John Bentley as Paul Temple
- Patricia Dainton as Steve Temple
- Grey Blake as Storey
- Peter Gawthorne as Sir Graham Forbes
- Valentine Dyall as Superintendent Bradley
- Robert Urquhart as Slater
- Christopher Lee as Sir Felix Raybourne
- Dan Jackson as Sakki
- Ronald Leigh-Hunt as Inspector Ross
- Arthur Hill as Cranmer Guest
- Ben Williams as Reddy Carson

== Production ==
The film was shot at Walton Studios with sets designed by the art director George Paterson. Some location shooting also took place in London.

== Critical reception ==
The Monthly Film Bulletin wrote: "On the whole, the somewhat thin and bloodless story does hold together, even if it often just misses being convincing. The camera tends to be over-suggestive, especially in indicating the murderer, but this fault may lie with the editing rather than the direction. Competent acting ensures this inoffensive thriller some measure of success."

Kine Weekly wrote: "The picture moves around and introduces an artful touch of colour into its hardy blood and thunder, but fails to spring a surprise climax. John Lender has an engaging and disarming way with him as Temple. Patricia Dainton pleases as Steve, but Grey Blake lets the side down through no fault of his own as Storey. It's obvious from the start that he is the killer, and lack of subtlety takes some of the sting out of the robust "who-dunnit." The impediment is, however, considerably offset by effectively sinister atmosphere, apt light relief and spectacular pyrotechnic 'curtain'."

TV Guide called the film a "standard murder mystery."

Britmovie wrote: "B-movie director Maclean Rogers keeps the story moving at a brisk pace and makes good use of exterior locations."

== Home media ==
Renown Pictures has issued all four Paul Temple films on DVD.
