= Salute the Toff =

1952 British film by Maclean Rogers

- Directed by: Maclean Rogers
- Written by: John Creasey
- Based on: Salute the Toff by John Creasey
- Produced by: Ernest G. Roy
- Starring: John Bentley; Carol Marsh; Valentine Dyall
- Cinematography: Geoffrey Faithfull
- Edited by: Jim Connock
- Music by: Wilfred Burns
- Production company: Nettlefold Films
- Distributed by: Butcher's Film Service
- Release date: January 1952
- Running time: 75 minutes
- Country: United Kingdom
- Language: English

Salute the Toff (also known as Brighthaven Express) is a 1952 British crime film directed by Maclean Rogers and starring John Bentley and Carol Marsh. It was written by John Creasey based on his 1941 novel of the same title, the sixth in a series featuring upper-class sleuth Richard Rollinson, also known as "The Toff".

== Plot ==
The Honourable Richard Rollinson is a well-known private detective who has friends and contacts in all echelons of society from the wealthy West End set to the lowest East End hovels. He likes to take on cases on behalf of underdogs, and is feared by the criminal underworld for his fearsome reputation of always getting his man.

Young secretary Fay Gretton comes to Rollinson, worried that her employer has not shown up for work for several days and cannot be contacted. Rollinson breaks into the man's flat and finds a body – not that of Fay's missing boss, but the son of a millionaire businessman. The missing man is the prime suspect, and it is up to Rollinson to get to the bottom of the case, aided by his East End contacts. After a series of dramatic events, including Fay being abducted and tied up, the truth is finally revealed, the missing man is found, and Rollinson proves that he is innocent of any wrongdoing.

== Cast ==
- John Bentley as Richard Rollinson
- Carol Marsh as Fay Gretton
- Valentine Dyall as Inspector Grice
- Shelagh Fraser as Myra Lorne
- June Elvin as Lady Anthea
- Arthur Hill as Ted Harrison
- Michael Golden as Benny Kless
- Roddy Hughes as Jolly
- Wally Patch as Bert Ebbutt
- Vi Stevens as Emily Ebbutt
- Tony Britton as Draycott
- John Forbes-Robertson as Gerald Harvey
- Peter Bull as Lorne
- Peter Gawthorne as Mortimer Harvey
- Pauline Johnson as Phyllis Harvey
- Peter Dyneley as Lady Anthea's husband
- Peter Swanwick as night porter
- Andreas Malandrinos as Frederico

== Production ==
This film and another Toff adaptation, Hammer the Toff, were shot back-to-back at Nettlefold Studios in the summer of 1951. They were released to cinemas in January and May 1952 respectively.

== Reception ==
Kine Weekly wrote: "The picture, which alternates between London's West End and underworld, is so crowded that it is difficult to keep track of the main plot, but despite occasional confusion, incidental moments are both amusing and exciting. ... a sturdy, comprehensive yarn"

The Daily Film Renter called it "a deep and varied plot of robbery and murder, calculated to keep audience attention alert, a popular winner in the mystery and murder category."

Today's Cinema enjoyed the film, but pointed out that sophisticated fare was not on the menu by classing it as a "bustling crime and detection action of the brand beloved by the masses."

== Preservation status ==
Salute the Toff and Hammer the Toff were included on the British Film Institute's "75 Most Wanted" list of missing British feature films. This changed when Salute the Toff was released on DVD in November 2013, and Hammer the Toff in March 2016, by Renown Pictures Limited.

== See also ==
- List of rediscovered films
