= For You Alone =

- Promotional poster
- Directed by: Geoffrey Faithfull
- Written by: Kathleen Butler; Montgomery Tully
- Produced by: F.W. Baker
- Starring: Lesley Brook; Dinah Sheridan; Jimmy Hanley
- Cinematography: Ernest Palmer
- Music by: Harry Bidgood
- Distributed by: Butcher's Film Service
- Release date: 28 May 1945
- Running time: 105 minutes
- Country: United Kingdom
- Language: English

For You Alone is a 1945 British World War II romance melodrama, one of only two films directed by cinematographer Geoffrey Faithfull, starring Lesley Brook, Dinah Sheridan and Jimmy Hanley. It was written by Kathleen Butler and Montgomery Tully.

== Preservation status ==
The film was included on the BFI's "75 Most Wanted" list of missing British feature films. On 31 July 2019, a 16mm safety print was uncovered by Ray Langstoneat the UCLA Film and Television Archive using their online searchable database, being held as part of the Mel Torme Collection.

== Plot ==
John Bradshaw, a young naval officer, attends a lunchtime concert at Westminster Central Hall where he meets Reverend Peter Britton and his daughter Katherine. After the concert the three share a taxi, and after seeing her father off on the train to a conference Katherine agrees to have tea with John. They enjoy each other's company and later go to see a film, followed by dinner and a stroll along the Thames Embankment. John impulsively tells Katherine that he has fallen in love with her, but she reminds him that they hardly know one another, and since her brother's death in the Far East she has to devote herself to her father.

The couple finally part, agreeing to meet again the following day. However Katherine receives a telegram at her hotel, stating that her brother Dennis has turned up alive and will be arriving home the next day. She returns home early the next morning, leaving a note of explanation for John. Unfortunately John forgets the name of Katherine's hotel, so does not receive the note and is distraught when she fails to turn up for their rendezvous. Meanwhile, back at home, Katherine finds that Dennis is accompanied by Max Borrow, an old admirer who still wants to marry her. He has sustained serious eye injuries while saving Dennis' life, and Katherine as a result feels she must accept him. Dennis himself immediately rekindles his courtship with local schoolteacher Stella White.

John remembers that Katherine's father is due to return to London from the conference and waits at the station until he arrives. They learn from the hotel why Katherine departed so hurriedly, and Rev. Britton invites John back to their village where he knows the local squire is looking for help in cataloguing his library. John is deeply upset to discover Katherine is engaged, and also resentful towards Dennis and Stella for their obvious happiness together. Katherine finally admits to John the reason she and Max are engaged, and John agrees to not pursue matters unless Max can be cured.

Max goes off for a medical examination, and John is recalled to his ship. As he is about to leave, a fire breaks out in a storage shed where children are playing. Max, having been told that his sight is safe, arrives back while the drama is in progress, and John is injured as he rescues the children. Katherine's reaction leaves Max in no doubt as to her feelings. That evening he tells her that he knows the situation, and will release her from her obligation to him so that she may marry John.

== Cast ==
- Lesley Brook as Katherine Britton
- Dinah Sheridan as Stella White
- Jimmy Hanley as Dennis Britton
- Robert Griffiths as John Bradshaw
- G. H. Mulcaster as Rev. Peter Britton
- Hay Petrie as Sir Henry Markham
- Olive Walter as Lady Markham
- Manning Whiley as Max Borrow
- Irene Handl as Miss Trotter
- George Merritt as P.C. Blundell
- Muriel George as Mrs. Johns
- Aubrey Mallalieu as eye specialist
- Heddle Nash as himself
- Helen Hill as herself

== Reception ==
The Daily Film Renter wrote: "Simple love story inspired by song which gives title to picture. Elaborate musical setting, both instrumental and vocal, with London Symphony Orchestra and Heddle Nash at the start, and Albert Sandler and Helen Hill later in the film. Pleasant humorous touches – village gossip, country fair and scenes in church and school – diversify a plot with slight pathetic lining. Should be sure of a welcome in the populars, and will not be despised even by the more sophisticated.

Kine Weekly wrote: "Warm, ingratiating and musically exciting romantic comedy melodrama, recording the heartbeats of a sensitive and refined young woman torn between love and duty. The story, set for the most part in a picturesque English village, seldom departs from the obvious, but a strong star performance and the incidental music supplied by the London Symphony Orchestra give it sufficient 'pull' as a supporting family programmer."

The Monthly Film Bulletin wrote: "The film is much too long, and many scenes of wartime village life, though mildly entertaining, might, with advantage, have been omitted."

== See also ==
- List of rediscovered films
