= Black Orchid (film) =

1953 British film by Charles Saunders

- Theatrical release poster
- Directed by: Charles Saunders
- Written by: Francis Edge; John Temple-Smith; Maurice Temple-Smith
- Produced by: Robert S. Baker; Monty Berman
- Starring: Ronald Howard; Olga Edwardes; John Bentley; Mary Laura Wood
- Cinematography: Eric Cross
- Edited by: Jack Slade
- Release date: February 1953
- Running time: 58 minutes
- Country: United Kingdom
- Language: English

Black Orchid is a 1953 British B mystery film directed by Charles Saunders and starring Ronald Howard, Olga Edwardes and John Bentley. It was written by Francis Edge, John Temple-Smith and Maurice Temple-Smith.

In the film, a physician is implicated in the death of his wife, which allows him to marry her sister.

== Plot ==
Dr. John Winnington and Sophie have an unhappy marriage, and John falls in love with his new laboratory assistant, Sophie's sister Christine. Sophie agrees to a divorce and announces her intention to leave for South Africa. Feeling unwell on the day of her departure, John gives her a stimulant, but she is run down by a lorry. When poison is found in her body, John is accused of murder.

== Cast ==
- Ronald Howard as Dr. John Winnington
- Olga Edwardes as Christine Shaw
- John Bentley as Eric Blair
- Mary Laura Wood as Sophie Winnington
- Patrick Barr as Vincent Humphries
- Sheila Burrell as Annette
- Russell Napier as Inspector Markham
- Mary Jones as Mrs. Humphries
- Alan Robinson as solicitor
- Ian Fleming as coroner
- Tom Gill as travel agent clerk
- Tucker McGuire as American woman
- Richard Shaw as lorry driver
- Daniel Wherry as padre

== Critical reception ==
The Monthly Film Bulletin wrote: "An indifferent murder story. Every piece of the puzzle falls into place too perfectly and none of the players seem really comfortable in their parts, even Ronald Howard lacking his usual charm."

Picturegoer wrote: "Who did it? ... The solution is worked out neatly and deftly and holds the interest throughout. But the film loses its grip halfway through."

Sky Movies wrote, "Following his success in the title parts of the Paul Temple and Toff films, John Bentley starred in this murder melodrama which is very typical of British second feature production of the period."
