= Ernest G. Roy =

British film producer (1892–1977)

Ernest George Roy
- Born: 1892; London, United Kingdom
- Occupation: Producer

Ernest G. Roy (1892–1977) was a British film producer who was managing director of Kay (West End) Laboratories, Kay Carlton Hill Studios Ltd and Nettlefold Studios.

Roy was born in Clerkenwell, London, in 1892, son of Charles (1857–1932) and Lucy (1859–1942). He was brother to Eliza, Alfred, Charles, Elsie and Gladys and knew Charlie Chaplin in his youth, through his association with the ensemble Eight Lancashire Lads. Prior to World War I, he was manager to J. W. Jackson who had various troupes of dancers working throughout England, America, Germany and France including the Eight Lancashire Lads in which Chaplin performed.

In 1912, he worked in Paris at the Chatelet Theatre and then in the Marigny Theatre where Mistinguett was appearing. After a year in Paris he returned to England and appeared at the Alhambra Theatre in Leicester Square with various reviews including Eightpence a Mile and Keep Smiling. He toured all over England, Scotland and Ireland. His sister Edith Elsie Roy (1896-1925) also danced and performed with him, as did her husband whom she married in 1916, Percy Frederick Smith. He left the stage in 1914 to join up as a soldier.

Following World War I, Roy joined Kay Laboratories in 1919 as general manager and director under chairman David Martineau, with Alan and Louis Martineau on the board. The company, which started its processing facility in 1916, was located in Red Lion Square, Holborn, London, but soon moved to 22 Soho Square and had premises in Greek Street, London as well as processing facilities in Finsbury Park, North London.Under his leadership, Kay's went from being a processor of orthochromatic film to a sophisticated processor of colour film. Its name is seen on many colour films of the post-war period. It was one of the first to install colour processing equipment under the vision of George Hawkes (technical director) with A.W. Smart and Charles Parkhouse. He was awarded a Fellowship by the British Kinematograph, Sound and Television Society. His family home was Dukes Place in West Peckham Kent and he had an apartment over the studios in Greek Street, London.

Nettlefold Studios had been owned by the Birmingham Industrial family and in 1926 acquired film studios from Cecil Hepworth at Walton-on-Thames. The studios were requisitioned by Vickers-Armstrongs in 1940 to build Wellington Bombers.

Roy headed production for Kay's after the Second World War, overseeing films made at the company's Nettlefold Studios in Walton-on-Thames in Surrey which had previously been the Hepworth Studio, often in collaboration with Butcher's Film Service (a production and distribution company). Roy seems to have bought Nettleford in 1947 and films from this period include Tom Brown's Schooldays (1951), Scrooge (1951) with Alastair Sim and The Pickwick Papers (1952). Others include a series of Paul Temple films. He produced Laurence Harvey's first starring film, There Is Another Sun (1951). His final film at Kay's was Marilyn (1953).

He died at Hastings in 1977.

== Selected filmography ==
- The Hills of Donegal (1947)
- Master of Bankdam (1947)
- Calling Paul Temple (1948)
- The Monkey's Paw (1948)
- The Story of Shirley Yorke (1948)
- Dark Secret (1949)
- Paul Temple's Triumph (1951)
- Scarlet Thread (1951)
- ‘’Hammer the Toff’’ (1952)
- There Is Another Sun (1951)
- Madame Louise (1951)
- Paul Temple Returns (1952)
- Operation Diplomat (1953)
- Marilyn (1953)
- Hundred Hour Hunt (film)] (1953)
- There Was a Young Lady (1953)
- The Broken Horseshoe (1953)

== Bibliography ==
- Chibnall, Steve & McFarlane, Steve. The British 'B' Film. Palgrave MacMillan, 2009.
