= Once a Sinner (1950 film) =

1950 British film by Lewis Gilbert

- Directed by: Lewis Gilbert
- Written by: David Evans
- Produced by: John Argyle
- Starring: Pat Kirkwood; Jack Watling
- Cinematography: Len Harris; Frank North
- Edited by: Lister Laurance
- Music by: Ronald Binge
- Distributed by: Butcher's Film Service (UK); Hoffberg Productions (USA)
- Release date: July 1950 (UK)
- Running time: 78 minutes
- Country: United Kingdom
- Language: English

Once a Sinner is a 1950 British drama film directed by Lewis Gilbert and starring Pat Kirkwood, Jack Watling and Joy Shelton. It was written by David Evans.

== Plot ==
Bank clerk John Ross falls for good-time girl Irene and ends his relationship with his fiancée Vera. Irene leaves her lover Jimmy Smart, a crook who has been passing forged bank notes, and although at first she tries to discourage John, they are quickly married. They soon find that Irene does not get along with John's middle-class parents and friends, and he is questioned by Inspector Rance and his manager at the bank over a counterfeit bank note he failed to spot; he realises that Irene is passing over Smart's counterfeit bank notes to her father and others.

When John finally insists on meeting Irene's mother he is taken aback by her hostility towards her own daughter, but he learns that Irene has a child by her former lover, Jimmy.

John tells her it's over between them and Irene reluctantly goes back to Jimmy and they move to London. A few weeks later, when John's father gives him his letters from Irene which his mother had tried to hide from him, John realises he still wants Irene and he sets off to find her.

The actual counterfeiter, a man called Charlie, lives in the room opposite Jimmy and Irene and she finds out that he actually makes the notes. Charlie arranges to have Jimmy killed and, although he manages to kill one of his attackers, Jimmy is shot and fatally wounded.

John arrives and persuades Irene to go with him and they decide they will try to make a life together in a new place, away from his disapproving family and friends. However, on the train back to town Irene sees Inspector Rance on the train and decides that John would be better off without her, and throws herself from the moving train.

Before John realises what has happened, Inspector Rance comes into his carriage and tells him that Irene is in the clear over the bank notes.

== Cast ==
- Pat Kirkwood as Irene James
- Jack Watling as John Ross
- Joy Shelton as Vera Lamb
- Sydney Tafler as Jimmy Smart
- Thora Hird as Mrs James
- Humphrey Lestocq as Lewis Canfield
- Gordon McLeod as Mr Ross
- Edith Sharpe as Mrs Ross
- Harry Fowler as Bill James
- Danny Green as Ticker James
- Stuart Lindsell as Inspector Rance
- Olive Sloane as Lil
- George Street as Bridges
- Rose Howlett as Mrs Lamb
- Charles Paton as Mr Lamb
- Stuart Latham as Charlie
- Cameron Hall as Mr Barker
- Nora Gordon as Mrs Barker
- Norman Williams as Fred, barman

== Critical reception ==
Kine Weekly wrote: "Pat Kirkwood not only looks and acts the part as the streamlined Irene, Jack Watling registers in the unrewarding role of John, and Sidney Tafler is the most promising of the supporting players. ... The film rattles along at a brisk pace, but much of it is sordid and its unhappy ending fails to ring true."

The Monthly Film Bulletin wrote: "Superficial melodrama."

Picturegoer wrote: "Pat Kirkwood places a great deal of reliance on revealing clothes and heavy make-up in her portrayal of Irene, but nevertheless manages to be a fairly convincing bad girl. The supporting cast, with Sydney Tafler and Humphrey Lestocq, is generally good. Certainly not a bad picture, but I have a feeling that the Americans would have made it far more slickly and credibly than this."

Picture Show wrote: "Pat Kirkwood makes the most of the acting opportunities offered her ... Jack Watling as the husband and Sydney Tafler as the oily 'spiv' are excellent."

Variety wrote: “In an effort to prove that the upper-class gentry should not mingle with the lower strata, this turns out to be a very thin English effort. It's all told implausibly. The pic carries a certain amount of wallop when It goes sexy, but even this sometimes becomes stilted. Miss Kirkwood supplies the sex lure In a neat flamboyant package. ... Lewis Gilbert's direction seldom is convincing."

Leslie Halliwell called the film: "an uninteresting character melodrama which defeats its lightweight stars."

In British Sound Films: The Studio Years 1928–1959 David Quinlan rated the film as “average” and wrote: “Kirkwood surprisingly good in straight role, but film lacks basic credibility.''
