= Calling Paul Temple =

1948 British film by Maclean Rogers

- Directed by: Maclean Rogers
- Written by: Francis Durbridge (radio play); A.R. Rawlinson; Kathleen Butler
- Produced by: Ernest G. Roy
- Starring: John Bentley; Dinah Sheridan; Margaretta Scott
- Distributed by: Butcher's Film Service (UK) Eagle-Lion (West Germany)
- Release date: June 1948
- Running time: 92 minutes
- Country: United Kingdom
- Language: English

Calling Paul Temple is a 1948 British crime film directed by Maclean Rogers and starring John Bentley, Dinah Sheridan and Margaretta Scott. It was the second in a series of four Paul Temple films distributed by Butcher's Film Service. The first was Send for Paul Temple (1946), with Anthony Hulme as Paul Temple. John Bentley then took over the role in Calling Paul Temple, continuing for two further films: Paul Temple's Triumph (1950) and Paul Temple Returns (1952). It was produced by Ernest G. Roy at the Nettlefold Film Studios in Walton On Thames.

== Plot ==
A woman is found dead on a train, and the name "Rex" has been written on the pull-down blind. It is the third in a mysterious string of "Rex" murders, all carried out on trains. And soon there's a fourth murder. All the victims are discovered to have been the wealthy patients of a doctor who specialises in nervous disorders. The detective novelist Paul Temple and his wife Steve are called in to help Scotland Yard's Sir Graham Forbes solve the case before the serial killer strikes again. While at a nightclub, they receive a message from singer Norma Rice concerning the murders. But before Sir Graham has the chance to speak to her she dies, falling down the stairs in the middle of her second number, What's Cooking in Cabaret?. The suspects include the Egyptian therapist Dr Kohima, his mysterious secretary Mrs Trevelyan, and a salesman, Hugh Pryse of the Quick Boil Kettle Company (in the next carriage when one of the murders takes place).

== Production ==
Calling Paul Temple was based on the Francis Durbridge radio serial Send for Paul Temple Again, broadcast in September 1945. Writing credits for the film are Francis Durbridge, A.R. Rawlinson & Kathleen Butler. Steve Race (with Sid Colin) wrote the two songs performed by Celia Lipton, and appeared himself as the bandleader in the nightclub section. The footage includes evocative shots of gothic Canterbury in the 1940s.

== Cast ==
- John Bentley as Paul Temple
- Dinah Sheridan as Steve Temple
- Margaretta Scott as Mrs. Trevellyan
- Abraham Sofaer as Dr. Kohima
- Celia Lipton as Norma Rice
- Jack Raine as Sir Graham Forbes
- Alan Wheatley as Edward Lathom
- Hugh Pryse as Wilfred Davies
- Wally Patch as Spider Williams
- Shaym Bahadur as Rikki
- Maureen Glynne as Girl in Boat
- Michael Golden as Frank Chester
- Harry Herbert as Boatman
- Aubrey Mallalieu as Waiter
- John McLaren as Leo Brent
- Ian McLean as Inspector Crane
- George Merritt as Ticket Inspector
- Mary Midwinter as Carol Reagan
- Hugh Miller as Doctor
- Steve Race as Bandleader
- Gerald Rex as Boy in Boat
- Paul Sheridan as Maitre d`Hotel
- Marion Taylor as Esther van Ralston
- Merle Tottenham as Millie
