= Operation Diplomat (film) =

1953 film by John Guillermin

- Directed by: John Guillermin
- Screenplay by: A. R. Rawlinson; John Guillermin
- Story by: Francis Durbridge
- Produced by: Ernest G. Roy
- Starring: Guy Rolfe; Lisa Daniely; Patricia Dainton; Sydney Tafler
- Cinematography: Gerald Gibbs
- Edited by: Joseph Sterling
- Music by: Wilfred Burns
- Production company: Nettleford
- Distributed by: Butcher's Film Service
- Release date: December 1953 (UK)
- Running time: 70 minutes
- Country: United Kingdom
- Language: English

Operation Diplomat is a 1953 British second feature ('B') drama film directed by John Guillermin and starring Guy Rolfe and Lisa Daniely. It was written by A. R. Rawlinson and Guillermin based on a story by Francis Durbridge. It was produced by Ernest G. Roy.

== Plot summary ==
Mr. Mark Fenton, a surgeon operating on an unknown patient discovers that he is involved in the kidnapping of a British diplomat. After his hospital patient Mrs. Terry is murdered for revealing the patient's identity, the police are called in.

== Cast ==
- Guy Rolfe as Mr. Mark Fenton
- Lisa Daniely as Lisa Durand
- Patricia Dainton as Sister Rogers
- Sydney Tafler as Wade
- Ballard Berkeley as Inspector Austin
- Anton Diffring as Shroder
- Brian Worth as Geoffrey Terry
- Michael Golden as Harrison
- James Raglan as Sir Oliver Peters
- Avice Landone as Mrs. Terry
- Eric Berry as Colonel Williams
- Edward Dain as Sergeant Lewis
- William Franklyn as Dr. Gillespie
- Desmond Llewelyn as Police Constable (uncredited)

== Critical reception ==
The Monthly Film Bulletin called it an "energetic yet improbable figure with too many points left unexplained".

Kine Weekly wrote: "Hearty 'thick ear' efficiently acted and more than adequately staged. ... The picture contains one or two minor technical flaws, such as a gun fight on rooftops which fails to attract the slightest notice of flat-dwellers, but otherwise it's stoutly carpentered, actionful crime melodrama. Guy Rolfe acts with dignity and energy as Mark, Patricia Dainton displays schoolgirl-like relish as Sister Rogers, and Ballard Berkeley, the screen's most convincing cop, scores as Inspector Austin. The support is effective, too. There are innumerable chases, quietly interleaved with relevant touches of sentiment and, above all, a really hectic finale. What more can the 'ninepennies' demand?"

The Daily Film Renter wrote: "Adapted from a recent television serial, the structure follows the accepted lines for mystery-thriller mellers. ...The dialogue is of the bread and butter variety, and the photography is adequate to the job in hand."

TV Guide concluded that "this film is hard to swallow, but the non-stop action helps cover up the gaping holes in the plot."

In British Sound Films: The Studio Years 1928–1959 David Quinlan rated the film as "average", writing: "Unlikely, but vigourous thriller."

FilmInk wrote that "it's crisply done".

A profile of the director in Film Comment called the film "perhaps the first example of prime Guillermin ... a 70-minute programmer so tautly directed that every image counts, every detail matters, every actor's movement feels perfectly timed – a true gem."
