= The Black Rider (film) =

1954 British film by Wolf Rilla

- Australian daybill poster
- Directed by: Wolf Rilla
- Written by: A. R. Rawlinson
- Based on: Marion by Peter Jones
- Produced by: A.R. Rawlinson
- Starring: Jimmy Hanley; Rona Anderson; Leslie Dwyer
- Cinematography: Geoffrey Faithfull
- Edited by: John Trumper
- Music by: Wilfred Burns
- Production company: Balblair Productions
- Distributed by: Butcher's Film Service
- Release date: December 1954
- Running time: 65 minutes
- Country: United Kingdom
- Language: English

The Black Rider is a 1954 British crime thriller film directed by Wolf Rilla and starring Jimmy Hanley, Rona Anderson, and Leslie Dwyer. It was written by A. R. Rawlinson and produced as a low budget second feature for release by Butcher's Film Service.

== Plot ==
In a small seaside town in Southern England Jerry Marsh, a young reporter and amateur motorcyclist, investigates sightings of a hooded black figure on a motorbike. It turns out that a gang of smugglers use a haunted castle as their base, deterring curious locals by pretending to be ghosts.

== Cast ==
- Jimmy Hanley as Jerry Marsh
- Rona Anderson as Mary Plack
- Leslie Dwyer as Robert Plack
- Lionel Jeffries as Martin Bremner
- Beatrice Varley as Mrs. Marsh
- Michael Golden as Rakoff
- Valerie Hanson as Karen
- Vincent Ball as Ted Lintott
- Edwin Richfield as Geoff Morgan
- Kenneth Connor as George Amble
- Robert Rietti as Mario
- James Raglan as Rackton
- Frank Atkinson as Landlord
- Edie Martin as elderly lady
- Peter Swanwick as holiday-maker

== Production ==
The film was shot at the Walton Studios near London. The film's sets were designed by the art director John Stoll.

== Reception ==
The Monthly Film Bulletin wrote: "This modest thriller achieves some excitement and suspense, which are helped out by the antics of the motor-cycle club. A good comedy performance by Leslie Dwyer spices an otherwise unremarkable film."

Kine Weekly wrote: "The picture, unblushing boys' adventure, subtly broadens its appeal by using motor cycle racing and gymkhanas to raise laughs and provide extra thrills, Jimmy Hanley displays a sure sense of humour and sets the right tempo, as Jerry, Rona Anderson has a touch of class as Mary, Leslie Dwyer amuses as the explosive Plack, and Lionel Jeffries is convinciing as Brenner. The concluding reels are great fun and, together with authentic atmosphere and first rate camera work, complete the entertainment oracle."

Picturegoer wrote: "It maintains maximum speed during its sixty-odd minute run."

Picture Show wrote: "Crisp comedy ... Exciting, brisk action with enthusiastic performances from the whole cast."

Britmovie writes that the "plot is seemingly lifted almost intact from the pages of a Boys' Own adventure or the writings of children’s author Enid Blyton. ... Of particular note here is Lionel Jeffries (The Revenge of Frankenstein 1958) as the villain of the piece. Although only in his late 20s, Jeffries already looks much older than his years and effortlessly brings to the role the gravitas it requires. ... Jeffries also succeeds in making A.R. Rawlinson’s mediocre dialogue sound far better than it actually is. ... This is a surprisingly stylish piece of filmmaking overall. Most importantly, Rilla succeeds in keeping the narrative moving at a brisk pace. At a time when low-budget British productions remained resolutely studio-bound, The Black Rider features a refreshing amount of exterior footage. Among the lengthiest sequences occurring outdoors is an obstacle course at a fete that takes on an almost newsreel-like quality."

According to TV Guide, "the only thing discomfiting about this film is the poor direction and inept acting".
