= The Third Alibi =

1961 British film by Montgomery Tully

- Directed by: Montgomery Tully
- Screenplay by: Maurice J. Wilson; Montgomery Tully
- Based on: play A Moment of Blindness by Pip Baker; Jane Baker
- Produced by: Maurice J. Wilson
- Starring: Laurence Payne; Patricia Dainton; Jane Griffiths
- Cinematography: Walter J. Harvey (as James Harvey)
- Edited by: Jim Connock
- Music by: Don Banks
- Production company: Eternal Films Limited
- Distributed by: Grand National Pictures (UK)
- Release date: September 1961 (UK)
- Running time: 68 minutes
- Country: United Kingdom
- Language: English

The Third Alibi is a 1961 British 'B' thriller film directed by Montgomery Tully and starring Laurence Payne, Patricia Dainton, Jane Griffiths and Edward Underdown. The screenplay is by Maurice J. Wilson and Tully, based on the play A Moment of Blindness by Pip and Jane Baker.

Cleo Laine (billed as a guest star) is seen singing a musical number during a brief sequence set in a theatre; her piano accompanist is an uncredited (and unspeaking, though clearly visible) Dudley Moore, in his first film role.

== Plot ==
Musicals composer Norman Martell is having an affair with his wife Helen's divorced half sister, Peggy. Peggy repeatedly asks him to obtain a divorce and marry her; he finally agrees when she becomes pregnant. His wife refuses his request, partly because she still loves Norman, but also out of sibling rivalry, saying that their parents had always made her give way to Peggy's demands, but she would not give in to her this time. She suggests that the child's father may be someone else. Martell cannot just leave his wife, as she manages his royalty income. Instead, he plots her murder with Peggy, intending to use the tape recorder he uses in his composing to establish an alibi. Helen, however, has decided to allow the divorce, and goes to tell her sister, but when she goes to Peggy's house, she overhears their plans, and uses them to devise a murder plan herself.

== Cast ==
- Laurence Payne as Norman Martell
- Patricia Dainton as Helen Martell
- Jane Griffiths as Peggy Hill
- Edward Underdown as Doctor Murdoch
- John Arnatt as Superintendent Ross
- Humphrey Lestocq as producer
- Lucy Griffiths as Miss Potter
- Cleo Laine as singer
- Arthur Hewlett as Marshall
- Annette Kerr as cinema cashier
- Dudley Moore as piano accompanist (uncredited)

== Critical reception ==
The Monthly Film Bulletin wrote: "Despite one or two flaws in the story, this is a cleverly worked out little thriller whose theatrical development and powerful twist ending ensure continuity of excitement. Furthermore, its economy extends to the dialogue as well as the footage, and the acting meets all demands."

TV Guide gave the film two out of four stars, calling it a "tight little thriller."

BFI Screenonline wrote, "The Third Alibi benefits distinctly from the assured economy of his [Tully's] direction. Compact, low-key, but exciting ... this later work is, characteristically, constructed with precision; and moves smoothly and swiftly towards an effective and ingenious denouement."

The Radio Times Guide to Films gave the film 1/5 stars, writing: "This is the kind of shoddy crime thriller that gives even low-budget features a bad name. The action never for a second escapes its stage origins ... Blame playwrights Pip and Jane Baker for the elaborate murder games, but even they are betrayed by a cast incapable of holding its own in an amateur theatrical."
