= No Road Back =

- Theatrical release poster
- Directed by: Montgomery Tully
- Screenplay by: Charles Leeds; Montgomery Tully; Falkland Cary; Philip Weathers
- Produced by: Steven Pallos
- Starring: Skip Homeier; Paul Carpenter; Patricia Dainton; Norman Wooland; Margaret Rawlings; Eleanor Summerfield; Alfie Bass; Sean Connery
- Cinematography: Lionel Banes
- Edited by: Jim Connock
- Music by: John Veale
- Production company: Gibraltar Films
- Distributed by: RKO Radio Pictures
- Release date: 1957
- Running time: 83 minutes
- Country: United Kingdom
- Language: English

No Road Back is a 1957 British second feature ('B') crime film directed by Montgomery Tully and starring Skip Homeier, Paul Carpenter and Patricia Dainton. It was written by Charles Leeds and Tully from a play by Falkland Cary and Philip Weathers, who contributed additional dialogue.

The film is notable for being the first major film role for future filmstar Sean Connery, as a minor gangster with a speech impediment.

== Plot ==
Mrs. Railton is blind and deaf from a wartime injury. She allows a criminal gang to use her London club as a hideout, and acts as a fence for their stolen goods. Her son John is unhappy with the gang's criminal activities and tries, but fails, to sabotage a diamond robbery. When gangleader Clem Hayes murders driver Rudge Harvey, he disposes the corpse in the back of Rudge's car. Seeing the car parked in front of the club, John drives it back to Rudge's house, but he's seen exiting the car, making him seem like the suspect. Mrs. Railton forces Clem to sign a confession and take the rap.

== Cast ==
- Skip Homeier as John Railton
- Paul Carpenter as Clem Hayes
- Patricia Dainton as Beth
- Norman Wooland as Inspector Harris
- Margaret Rawlings as Mrs. Railton
- Eleanor Summerfield as Marguerite
- Alfie Bass as Rudge Harvey
- Sean Connery as "Spike"

== Reception ==
The Monthly Film Bulletin wrote: "This taut crime thriller, though efficiently handled, is marred by several outbursts of vicious brutality. Competent playing by Margaret Rawlings as the afflicted but razor-witted fence and Paul Carpenter (who is especially convincing in the safe-breaking scenes) lend credibility to an otherwise improbable plot line."

Kine Weekly wrote: "Margaret Rawlings, clever in the leading part, a resourceful supporting cast and an astute director handle the extravagant plot skilfully and the outcome is colourful and exciting crime-does-not-pay [...] The picture's tale is, to put it mildly, theatrical, but slick presentation gives it poignancy and punch."

Variety wrote: "Script develops a consistent degree of suspense, but the frequent use of sign language, though intriguing at times, has a delaying effect. Actual holdup achieves a note of realism [...] Carpenter is a typical heavy, while Miss Dalnton is given little opportunity as the blind woman's eyes and ears. Eleanor Summerfield, as a girl employed in the club, has a completely negative part, Norman Wooland, although given star billing, has only a minor role as a detective. Alfie Bass gives one of the best performances in the film as a driver who's ready to squeal when he discovers he's involved in a murder rap."

In The Radio Times Guide to Films David Parkinson gave the film 2/5 stars, writing: "Sean Connery had been a lifeguard and a coffin polisher before he began acting. He must have doubted the wisdom of giving up the day job after his first experience of film-making, as this is almost an Identikit 'quota quickie'. The lead is a skid-row American star (Skip Homeier), the plot is a threadbare crime caper, the sets are cheap and much of the action takes place in dank inner-city backstreets. Crooks Connery and Alfie Bass are convincing enough, with their botched robbery causing Homeier to question the honesty of his blind and deaf, club-owning ma."

In British Sound Films: The Studio Years 1928–1959 David Quinlan rated the film as "mediocre", writing: "Gloomy, dull drama, uneventful apart from a good safecracking sequence."

== See also ==
- List of films featuring the deaf and hard of hearing
