= Hammer the Toff =

1952 British film by Maclean Rogers

- Directed by: Maclean Rogers
- Written by: John Creasey
- Produced by: Ernest G. Roy
- Starring: John Bentley; Patricia Dainton; Valentine Dyall
- Cinematography: Geoffrey Faithfull
- Edited by: Jim Connock
- Production company: Nettlefold Films
- Distributed by: Butcher's Film Service
- Release date: March 1952 (UK)
- Running time: 71 minutes
- Country: United Kingdom
- Language: English

Hammer the Toff is a 1952 British second feature crime film directed by Maclean Rogers and starring John Bentley and Patricia Dainton. The film was based on the 1947 novel of the same name by John Creasey, the 17th in the series featuring upper-class sleuth Richard Rollinson, also known as "The Toff".

== Plot ==
On the train to the seaside resort of Brighthaven, Richard Rollinson is sharing a carriage with an attractive young lady called Susan Lancaster. The journey is rudely interrupted when the window of the carriage is shattered by a barrage of bullets. Richard learns from the shaken Susan that she is on her way to join an uncle on holiday, and offers to escort her safely to her hotel. They learn that her uncle has disappeared, but has left Susan a package. Later, Rollinson happens to overhear a pair of shady characters discussing how to kidnap Susan. She explains that her uncle has developed a secret formula which sinister characters are keen to get their hands on, and they have been receiving threats of menace, hence the flight to Brighthaven.

Rollinson consults his old colleague Inspector Grice of Scotland Yard, who tells him that the evidence is pointing in the direction of a particular man as being responsible for the abduction. Using his friends and contacts in the East End, Rollinson investigates, while Susan is being kidnapped and tied up. Rollinson finally succeeds in identifying the criminals and their leader "The Hammer", releasing Susan and proving that the man suspected by the police is innocent.

== Cast ==
- John Bentley as Richard Rollinson
- Patricia Dainton as Susan Lancaster
- Valentine Dyall as Inspector Grice
- John Robinson as Linnett
- Wally Patch as Bert Ebbutt
- Roddy Hughes as Jolly
- Basil Dignam as Superintendent
- Lockwood West as Kennedy
- Katherine Blake as Janet Lord
- Charles Hawtrey as Cashier
- Ian Fleming as Doctor Lancaster

== Production ==
This film and another Toff adaptation Salute the Toff (1952) were shot back-to-back at Nettlefold Studios in the summer of 1951 with identical production credits and many of the same actors. Hammer the Toff was released in March 1952 as the sequel to Salute the Toff, and there would be no further entries in the series of films.

Although it was once considered lost, appearing on the British Film Institute's "75 Most Wanted" list of missing British feature films, it was released on DVD in March 2016.

== Critical reception ==
Kine Weekly described it as "well staged, with a bright line in dialogue, and neat crime angles", while the Daily Film Renter termed it "lively, easily-assimilated strong-arm stuff with a whiff of comedy and a dash of romance".

In British Sound Films: The Studio Years 1928–1959 David Quinlan rated the film as "average", writing: " Good source material, but just another tick-ear thriller results.

== See also ==
- List of rediscovered films
