= Rogues of the Turf =

1923 film

- Directed by: Wilfred Noy
- Written by: John F. Preston (play)
- Starring: Fred Groves; Olive Sloane; James Lindsay
- Production company: Carlton Films
- Distributed by: Butcher's Film Service
- Release date: January 1923
- Country: United Kingdom
- Languages: Silent; English intertitles

Rogues of the Turf is a 1923 British silent sports film directed by Wilfred Noy and starring Fred Groves, Olive Sloane and James Lindsay. The screenplay involves a plot to kidnap a race horse.

== Cast ==
- Fred Groves as Bill Higgins
- Olive Sloane as Marian Heathcote
- James Lindsay as Capt. Clifton
- Mavis Clair as Nellie Flaxman
- Bobbie Andrews as Arthur Somerton
- Clarence Blakiston as Sir George Venning
- Dora Lennox as Rose
- Nell Emerald as Nurse
- James Reardon as Rogue

== See also ==
- List of films about horses

== Bibliography ==
- Low, Rachael. The History of the British Film 1918-1929. George Allen & Unwin, 1971.
