= Paul Temple =

Character

- Crawford Logan and Gerda Stevenson as Paul and Steve
- First appearance: Send for Paul Temple (1938)
- Created by: Francis Durbridge
- Portrayed by: Anthony Hulme (film, 1946); John Bentley (film, 1948–1952); Francis Matthews (television, 1969–1971)
- Voiced by: Hugh Morton (1938–1939); Bernard Braden (1940); Carl Bernard (1941–1942); Richard Williams (1944); Barry Morse (1945); Howard Marion Crawford (1946); Kim Peacock (1946–1953); Peter Coke (1954–1968); Crawford Logan (2006–2013)

In-universe information
- Gender: Male
- Occupation: Author, detective
- Spouses: Louise ("Steve") Temple, née Harvey
- Nationality: English

Paul Temple is a fictional character created by English writer Francis Durbridge. Temple is a professional author of crime fiction and an amateur private detective. With his wife Louise, affectionately known (and almost exclusively referred to) as 'Steve' in reference to her journalistic pen name 'Steve Trent', he solves whodunnit crimes through subtle, humorously articulated deduction. Always the gentleman, the strongest expletive he employs is "by Timothy!".

Created for the BBC radio serial Send for Paul Temple in 1938, the Temples featured in more than 30 BBC radio dramas, twelve serials for German radio, four British feature films, a dozen novels, and a BBC television series. A Paul Temple daily newspaper strip ran in the London Evening News for two decades.

== Overview ==
Paul Temple was a professional novelist. While he possessed no formal training as a detective, his background in constructing crime plots for his novels enabled him to apply deductive reasoning to solve cases whose solution had eluded Scotland Yard.

Over the course of each case, Temple eschewed formal interviews or other police techniques, in favour of casual conversations with suspects and witnesses. Yet even this informal style of investigation invariably precipitated attempts by the suspects to hamper him, through traps, ambushes, even assassination attempts. Always surviving these, Temple would arrange a cocktail party or similar social event at which he unmasked the perpetrator. In many of the serials, the perpetrator in question had been operating under an assumed name, as the mastermind of complex criminal operations in the shadows while meeting Temple openly under their true identity.

At the end of each tale, Paul, Steve and Sir Graham Forbes of Scotland Yard held a post mortem. Here, Paul explained why certain events in the serial took place, which of these had been red herrings, and which had been genuine clues. In general, the serials feature similar types of events, often in the same sequence.

== Works ==
=== Original radio serials ===
The Paul Temple characters and formula were developed in a series of BBC Radio serials broadcast between 1938 and 1968, with various actors portraying the Temples. In the initial post-war period the detective was played by a succession of different actors: Barry Morse (1945), Howard Marion-Crawford (1946) and Kim Peacock (1946–1951). The longest-running team, and the most popular with audiences, was Peter Coke (pronounced Cook) and Marjorie Westbury, who starred together in every serial made between 1954 and 1968; Westbury had held the role of Steve since 1945.

The supporting characters of Sir Graham Forbes and the Temples' cockney butler Charlie were also repeatedly recast. Lester Mudditt was the longest lasting Sir Graham, playing the part from 1939 to 1958. He was replaced by Richard Williams, (who had previously voiced Paul in the 1944 version of News of Paul Temple), then James Thomason. Gareth Thomas of Blake's 7 fame essayed the role for the Crawford Logan-Gerda Stevenson remakes.

The radio series was a collaboration between writer Francis Durbridge and BBC producer Martyn C Webster, both of whom worked on all of the Paul Temple radio broadcasts aired over the thirty years from 1938 to 1968. Durbridge was still at college when he approached Webster, who was then with the BBC Midland Region, with a proposal for a mystery series about a gentleman detective.

Initially the serials were broadcast only on the Midlands transmitters of the BBC's pre-war Regional service. As they gained in popularity, they aired nationally on the newly created Home Service. However, in 1945 they found a new permanent home on the Light Programme, another national service, where they remained (except for occasional repeats on Home Service) until the final serial in 1968. The introductory and closing music for the majority of the serials was Coronation Scot, composed by Vivian Ellis, although the earliest serials (those aired up to December 1947) used an excerpt from Scheherazade by Rimsky-Korsakov. Repeats of some serials were heard on the successor to the Home Service, Radio 4, during the 1980s, and as late as 1992 (when The Spencer Affair was repeated to celebrate Francis Durbridge's 80th birthday).

Many of the earliest serials, in which the eponymous hero was played by many different actors, have not survived. Several were remade in the 1940s, in abridged form, as feature films. However, some of the early radio serials do still exist, including Paul Temple Intervenes from 1942, featuring the first appearance in the series by Marjorie Westbury, in a supporting role. All but one of the serials starring Peter Coke also exist: since 2003, these have been regularly repeated on digital station BBC Radio 7 (now BBC Radio 4 Extra). In 2005 the station tracked down the then 93-year-old Coke for a half-hour interview programme, Peter Coke and the Paul Temple Affair, and the actor was also interviewed in 1998 for a half-hour documentary Send For Paul Temple, an episode in the series The Radio Detectives.

Because no recordings survive for many of the early serials, in 2006 BBC Radio 4 began recreating them, in as authentic a manner as possible: as mono productions, employing vintage microphones and sound effects, and using the original scripts. In all cases Crawford Logan starred as Paul Temple with Gerda Stevenson as Steve, in place of the original leads. The first of these broadcasts, in August 2006, was a new eight-part production of Paul Temple and the Sullivan Mystery, originally aired in 1947. A new production of The Madison Mystery, from 1949, aired between May and July 2008, followed by the 1947 serial Paul Temple and Steve in June and July 2010. A Case for Paul Temple, from 1946, was transmitted in August and September 2011. The final such production was Paul Temple and the Gregory Affair, aired in 2013 (the longest of all the serials, running to ten episodes). Many of these new productions featured Welsh actor Gareth Thomas as Sir Graham Forbes, the Head of Scotland Yard. Each of the new recordings was also released on CD.

Paul Temple's catchphrase, "by Timothy", is used in his first scene in episode one of Send for Paul Temple, in the first line he speaks. He is describing his response to criticism by a reader of his last book: “I said, ‘My dear madam, the story may be hackneyed, the psychology may be warped, the characters may be unpleasant - but, by Timothy! The spelling’s terrific!’”. Interviewed in 2005, Peter Coke said he hated the phrase, because even in the 1950s he thought it sounded old-fashioned.

In 1998, on the death of author Francis Durbridge, the BBC broadcast a radio documentary about Paul Temple written and presented by Jeffrey Richards, entitled Send For Paul Temple (aired 20 May 1998), which featured extracts from surviving recordings held in the BBC Sound Archive including from the first ever serial in 1938, and a new interview with Peter Coke.

=== List of radio serials ===
Serial number	Serial title	As Paul Temple	As Steve (Louise) Temple	Original broadcast dates	Episodes	Archive status
1	Send for Paul Temple	Hugh Morton	Bernadette Hodgson	8 April – 27 May 1938 (BBC Midland region only)	8 × 25 minutes	1–5 & 7–8 lost, 6 exists. A 1940 remake for Canadian radio exists in full, starring Bernard Braden. (Note: Abridged remake in the 1946 film Send for Paul Temple)
2	Paul Temple and the Front Page Men	Hugh Morton	Bernadette Hodgson	1 November – 21 December 1938 (BBC Midland region only)	8 × 25 minutes	1–7 lost, 8 exists
3	News of Paul Temple	Hugh Morton	Bernadette Hodgson	13 November – 18 December 1939	6 × 25 minutes	all lost (Note: Abridged remake in the 1950 film Paul Temple's Triumph) (Note: Lester Mudditt first played Sir Graham Forbes, the Chief Commissioner of Scotland Yard, in this serial – and would continue to play that part in every serial up to and including The Spencer Affair in 1958.)
1 (abridged remake)	"Send for Paul Temple" (abridged remake)	Carl Bernard	Thea Holme	13 October 1941	1 × 60 minutes	lost
4	Paul Temple Intervenes	Carl Bernard	Bernadette Hodgson	30 October – 18 December 1942	8 × 20 minutes	exists in full (Note: Marjorie Westbury, who in 1945 would take over the role of Mrs Temple, had a supporting role in this serial (as Dolly Fraser – episode 1 only).) (Note: Abridged remake in the 1952 film Paul Temple Returns)
3 (abridged remake)	"News of Paul Temple" (abridged remake)	Richard Williams	Lucille Lisle	5 July 1944	1 × 60 minutes	lost
5	Send for Paul Temple Again	Barry Morse	Marjorie Westbury	13 September – 1 November 1945	8 × 30 minutes	all lost (Note: Abridged remake in the 1948 film Calling Paul Temple) (Note: Remade in 1968 with Peter Coke and Marjorie Westbury, as Paul Temple and the Alex Affair)
6	A Case for Paul Temple	Howard Marion Crawford	Marjorie Westbury	7 February – 28 March 1946	8 × 30 minutes	all lost (Note: Remade in 2011 starring Crawford Logan)
7	Paul Temple and the Gregory Affair	Kim Peacock	Marjorie Westbury	17 October – 19 December 1946	10 × 30 minutes	all lost (Note: Remade in 2013 starring Crawford Logan)
8	Paul Temple and Steve	Kim Peacock	Marjorie Westbury	30 March – 18 May 1947	8 × 30 Minutes	all lost (Note: Remade in 2010 starring Crawford Logan)
9	"Mr & Mrs Paul Temple"	Kim Peacock	Marjorie Westbury	23 November 1947	1 × 45 minutes	lost
10	Paul Temple and the Sullivan Mystery	Kim Peacock	Marjorie Westbury	1 December 1947 – 19 January 1948	8 × 30 minutes	all lost (Note: Remade in 2006 starring Crawford Logan) (Note: There was a rumour that recordings of this serial had been found. It arose when an American collector heard a recording of the BBC's 2006 re-make of this lost serial.)
11	Paul Temple and the Curzon Case	Kim Peacock	Marjorie Westbury	7 December 1948 – 25 January 1949	8 × 30 minutes	all lost
12	Paul Temple and the Madison Mystery	Kim Peacock	Marjorie Westbury	12 October – 30 November 1949	8 × 30 minutes	all lost
13	Paul Temple and the Vandyke Affair	Kim Peacock	Marjorie Westbury	30 October – 18 December 1950	8 × 30 minutes	exists in full (archived at the British Library) (Note: Remade in 1959 with Peter Coke and Marjorie Westbury)
14	Paul Temple and the Jonathan Mystery	Kim Peacock	Marjorie Westbury	10 May – 28 June 1951	8 × 30 minutes	all lost (Note: Remade in 1963 with Peter Coke and Marjorie Westbury)
15	"Paul Temple and Steve Again"	Kim Peacock	Marjorie Westbury	8 April 1953	1 × 60 minutes	lost
16	Paul Temple and the Gilbert Case	Peter Coke	Marjorie Westbury	29 March – 17 May 1954	8 × 30 minutes	exists in full (this is the version available on CD/cassette from the BBC Radio Collection) (Note: This is the version repeated by BBC Radio 4 Extra in 2011, 2013 and 2016)
12 (remake)	Paul Temple and the Madison Mystery (remake)	Peter Coke	Marjorie Westbury	20 June – 8 August 1955	8 × 30 Minutes	all lost
17	Paul Temple and the Lawrence Affair	Peter Coke	Marjorie Westbury	11 April – 30 May 1956	8 × 30 minutes	exists in full
18	Paul Temple and the Spencer Affair	Peter Coke	Marjorie Westbury	13 November 1957 – 1 January 1958	8 × 30 minutes	exists in full
13 (remake)	Paul Temple and the Vandyke Affair (remake)	Peter Coke	Marjorie Westbury	1 January – 19 February 1959	8 × 30 minutes	exists in full
19	Paul Temple and the Conrad Case	Peter Coke	Marjorie Westbury	2 March – 20 April 1959	8 × 30 minutes	exists in full
16 (remake)	Paul Temple and the Gilbert Case (remake)	Peter Coke	Marjorie Westbury	22 November 1959 – 10 January 1960	8 × 30 minutes	exists in full
20	Paul Temple and the Margo Mystery	Peter Coke	Marjorie Westbury	1 January – 19 February 1961	8 × 30 minutes	exists in full
14 (remake)	Paul Temple and the Jonathan Mystery (remake)	Peter Coke	Marjorie Westbury	14 October – 2 December 1963	8 × 30 minutes	exists in full
21	Paul Temple and the Geneva Mystery	Peter Coke	Marjorie Westbury	11 April – 16 May 1965	6 × 30 minutes	exists in full
5 (remake with 'Rex' changed to 'Alex')	Paul Temple and the Alex Affair (Note: Remake of Send for Paul Temple Again, with the name of the villain changed from "Rex" to "Alex")	Peter Coke	Marjorie Westbury	26 February – 21 March 1968	8 × 30 minutes	exists in full
10 (remake)	Paul Temple and the Sullivan Mystery (remake)	Crawford Logan	Gerda Stevenson	7 August – 2 October 2006	8 × 30 minutes	exists in full
12 (2nd remake)	Paul Temple and the Madison Mystery (remake)	Crawford Logan	Gerda Stevenson	16 May – 4 July 2008	8 × 30 minutes	exists in full
8 (remake)	Paul Temple and Steve (remake)	Crawford Logan	Gerda Stevenson	11 June – 30 July 2010	8 × 30 minutes	exists in full
6 (remake)	A Case for Paul Temple (remake)	Crawford Logan	Gerda Stevenson	24 August – 12 October 2011	8 × 30 minutes	exists in full
7 (remake)	Paul Temple and the Gregory Affair (remake)	Crawford Logan	Gerda Stevenson	3 July – 11 September 2013	10 × 30 minutes	exists in full

=== Film adaptations ===
Between 1946 and 1952, Paul Temple appeared in four feature films, each an abridged version of one of the early (hence, now lost) BBC radio serials. These films were distributed by Butcher's Film Service based in the North of England. All were made in the years before Peter Coke was cast as the definitive Paul Temple in the radio series in 1954. Marjorie Westbury had been established in the radio series by this point, but was not cast in these films because she was not a film actress.

- 1946 Send for Paul Temple (abridged remake of the radio serial of the same name) with Anthony Hulme (1910–2007) (born Harry Idris Miller) as Temple, Joy Shelton as Steve and Maire O'Neill as Mrs Neddy.
- 1948 Calling Paul Temple (abridged remake of radio serial Send for Paul Temple Again) with John Bentley as Temple and Dinah Sheridan as Steve.
- 1950 Paul Temple's Triumph (abridged remake of radio serial News of Paul Temple) with John Bentley as Temple and Dinah Sheridan as Steve.
- 1952 Paul Temple Returns (abridged remake of radio serial Paul Temple Intervenes) with John Bentley as Temple and Patricia Dainton as Steve. It was also released under the alternative title Bombay Waterfront.

=== BBC television series ===
Francis Durbridge licensed the television rights in his characters to the BBC, who between 1969 and 1971 produced a drama series entitled Paul Temple. It starred Francis Matthews as Paul Temple, and co-starred Ros Drinkwater as his wife Steve. None of the television scripts were written by Durbridge and the stories are set in the 70s and lack the period charm of the radio stories.

The 52 episodes, made over 4 seasons, were co-produced with ZDF, a West German television station based in Munich. This made it practicable, in terms of the show's budget, to film location scenes for the series overseas (i.e. in Munich and other cities in West Germany). The episodes were subsequently dubbed into German, using German voice artists, for broadcast by ZDF to German audiences.

Only 16 of the 52 episodes currently exist in the BBC's television archive with their original English soundtrack, and only 11 of these are in colour (for the other five, only black and white telerecordings survive). Seasons 2-4 survive, in colour, in archives in Germany, but with dubbed German soundtracks. The 11 colour episodes are available on DVD (EAN 5036193099021).

The theme tune of the television series was composed by Ron Grainer.

=== Novels ===
Many of the BBC Paul Temple radio serials were novelised between 1938 and 1989 by Francis Durbridge working with collaborators from his original scripts. The first was Send for Paul Temple (1938) with John Thewes. 'Thewes' is thought to have been a pseudonym for Charles Hatton, with whom Durbridge collaborated on the following four Temple novelisations up until 1948. All of these were rapidly adapted from the original scripts in order to capitalise on the popularity of the radio serial. Publicity for Send for Paul Temple described it as "the novel of the thriller that created a BBC fan-mail record". Durbridge used a co-author because he regarded himself as a writer of dialogue, a scriptwriter rather than a novelist. The two novels with Douglas Rutherford (The Tyler Mystery, 1957 and East of Algiers, 1959) appeared under the pen name 'Paul Temple'. The Tyler Mystery is unusual in giving Temple's wife Steve a more central role. East of Algiers was partly based on the 1947 radio serial Paul Temple and the Sullivan Mystery. From The Kelby Affair on the novels are credited to Francis Durbridge alone.

1. Send for Paul Temple (1938) (with John Thewes, aka Charles Hatton?)
2. Paul Temple and the Front Page Men (1939) (with Charles Hatton)
3. News of Paul Temple (1940) (with Charles Hatton)
4. Paul Temple Intervenes (1944) (with Charles Hatton)
5. Send for Paul Temple Again! (1948) (with Charles Hatton)
6. Paul Temple and the Tyler Mystery (1957) (with Douglas Rutherford)
7. Paul Temple: East of Algiers (1959) (with Douglas Rutherford)
8. Paul Temple and the Kelby Affair (1970)
9. Paul Temple and the Harkdale Robbery (1970)
10. Paul Temple and the Geneva Mystery (1971)
11. Paul Temple and the Curzon Case (1972)
12. Paul Temple and the Margo Mystery (1986)
13. Paul Temple and the Madison Case (1988)
14. Paul Temple and the Conrad Case (1989)

== Newspaper strip ==
Between 19 November 1951 and 1 May 1971, whilst the character was at the height of his popularity on radio and television, Paul Temple was adapted as a daily newspaper strip in the London Evening News. The strip was written by (and credited in-page to) Francis Durbridge himself.

Until 1954 the strip was drawn by Alfred Sindall. From 1954 onward it was continued by Bill Bailey, John McNamara and Philip Mendoza. Selected editions from the strips drawn by John McNamara were reprinted by an obscure South London magazine publisher, Micron, in a short lived series in 1964. At no stage did the strip feature recognisable portraits of the then-current stars of the radio series, Peter Coke and Marjorie Westbury.

== Commercial releases ==
All the surviving English-language radio episodes, including the 1940 Canadian remake of Send for Paul Temple, have been released on CD by the BBC.

The 11 surviving colour episodes held in the BBC archives (featuring Francis Matthews and Ros Drinkwater) from the BBC-TV version of "Paul Temple" were released on DVD on 6 July 2009 by Acorn Media UK. A further five black-and-white recordings (of originally colour episodes) were released in April 2012. All of Seasons 2-4 exist in Germany in various archives (principally in the archives of ZDF, the series' German co-producer) with soundtracks dubbed in German (just one, not existing at the BBC, survives in English). The German language versions have all been released on DVD in Germany by Fernsehjuwelen DVD.

In 2010 Renown Pictures Ltd, new owners of The Butchers Library, released on DVD the feature films Send For Paul Temple, Paul Temple Returns (a.k.a. Bombay Waterfront) and Calling Paul Temple.

During 2011–12 all four Paul Temple movies were released by Renown. A DVD box set of three was released in November 2011; the fourth film, Paul Temple's Triumph, was released singly, initially to Renown Club members only, in March 2012, but has since become generally available.

Starting in February 2016, all the surviving Paul Temple radio serials were released on CD across four new BBC box sets. These include the previously unreleased 1959 remake of Paul Temple and The Gilbert Case and the original 1950 Kim Peacock version of Paul Temple and The VanDyke Affair (the latter featuring Peter Coke in a supporting role) as well as the remakes made in the 21st century.

== International adaptations ==
=== Netherlands ===
In the Netherlands, several of the radio plays were re-recorded using Dutch actors and the title character's name adapted as Paul Vlaanderen.

=== Norway ===
In Norway there were made around 30 episodes for radio in three series in the years 1952 to 1973.
1952 - Paul Temple og Gregory-saken, based on Paul Temple and the Gregory-affair (1946)
1953 -Paul Temple og Madison-mysteriet, based on Paul Temple and the Madison Mystery (1949)
1973-Paul Temple og Milbourne-saken, based on Paul Temple and the Geneva Mystery (1965)

=== Germany ===
In Germany, twelve Paul Temple radio serials were adapted between 1949 and 1967, each episode (in common with the BBC serials) ending on a cliffhanger. They were listened to by such huge numbers of people that they earned the sobriquet Straßenfeger ("street sweepers"), because they left the streets practically deserted whenever an episode was broadcast. They were performed by actors of national renown, including Luxembourg-born René Deltgen (who played the title role in 11 of the 12 series), Gustav Knuth, Friedrich W Bauschulte, Pinkas Braun, Heinz Schimmelpfennig, Siegfried Wischnewski, Wolfgang Wahl, Günther Ungeheuer and Paul Klinger amongst others.

All 11 surviving German radio serials have since been released on CD as audiobooks. Two short-lived comic series by the Aachener Bildschriftenverlag and the Luna-Kriminalromane are rare collector's items.

In 2014, an abridged remake of the lost 1949 version of "Paul Temple and the Gregory Affair" was aired and released, followed by a live radio show in 2015 with the cast and the WDR Radio Orchestra, hosted by German Comedian Bastian Pastewka.

In 2015, all four Paul Temple feature films were released on DVD.

=== Italy ===
Seven Italian-language Paul Temple serials were produced by RAI between 1953 and 1977, each with a different voice actor in the title role:

- Paul Temple, il romanziere poliziotto (from A Case for Paul Temple), 1953 with Fernando Farese
- Paul Temple e il caso Gregory (from Paul Temple and the Gregory Affair), 1961 with Gualtiero Rizzi
- Paul Temple e l'Uomo di Zermatt (from Paul Temple and the Lawrence Affair), 1961 with Adolfo Geri
- Margò (from Paul Temple and the Margo Mystery), 1967 with Aroldo Tieri
- Chi è Jonathan? (from Paul Temple and the Jonathan Mystery), 1971 with Mario Feliciani
- La ragazza scomparsa (from Paul Temple and the Conrad Case), 1975 with Alberto Lupo
- Cabaret (from Paul Temple and the Spencer Affair), 1975 with Luigi Vannucchi

Both 1961 productions are presumed lost.

=== Israel ===
In Israel, the Voice of Israel began broadcasting the series on April 21, 1964 until 1968. The programme was directed and produced by Reuven Morgan starring Bezalel Levi as Paul Temple and Nili Keynan as his wife Steve. The series, which was broadcast in the days when there was no TV station in Israel, gained a wide audience. It was also known for the opening title "The Frightened City" performed by The Shadows, which added a touch of horror to the dramas.
