= The House in Marsh Road =

1960 British film by Montgomery Tully

- Original lobby card
- Directed by: Montgomery Tully
- Screenplay by: Maurice J. Wilson
- Based on: novel by Laurence Meynell
- Produced by: Maurice J. Wilson
- Starring: Tony Wright; Patricia Dainton; Sandra Dorne
- Cinematography: James Harvey
- Edited by: Jim Connock
- Music by: John Veale
- Production company: Merton Park Studios
- Distributed by: Grand National Pictures (UK)
- Release date: 12 December 1960
- Running time: 70 minutes
- Country: United Kingdom
- Language: English

The House in Marsh Road, known on American television as Invisible Creature, is a 1960 British horror suspense film produced by Maurice J. Wilson, directed by Montgomery Tully and starring Tony Wright, Patricia Dainton and Sandra Dorne. The plot centres on a benevolent poltergeist in a country home that protects a woman from her homicidal husband. It may be one of the first films to use the word 'poltergeist' in reference to a spirit or ghost. The film was never released to theatres in the USA and instead went straight to television.

The screenplay, also by Wilson, is based on the 1960 novel The House in Marsh Road by Laurence Meynell.

== Plot ==
David and Jean Linton move from rented flat to rented flat, leaving each with unpaid bills. David is a would-be author with an alcohol problem, and also involved in passing counterfeit notes. He has had several affairs during his marriage to Jean. Their luck changes when Jean inherits a house and £1,000 from a distant aunt.

They go to see the house, "Four Winds", which lies in a country location and decide to live there. They are told by the housekeeper, Mrs O'Brien ("Mrs B"), that the home is already inhabited – by a poltergeist she has named "Patrick", after her late husband. Patrick makes his presence known to Jean by moving furniture about, breaking mirrors, and so on. David treats Jean badly, and Patrick retaliates by giving David warnings to stop. David prefers spending time in the local pub, The Plough, rather than at home.

In the pub Morris Lumley tells him of Valerie Stockley, who might be able to type out his material for his novel. Lumley is an estate agent and offers him £6,000 for the house and land. However, David can do nothing as the house is in Jean's name and he is unable to convince her to sell. He hires local sexpot Valerie Stockley – she calls herself "Mrs" but her true marital status is questionable – as his typist and they begin an affair. He steals money from Jean to give to Valerie, who tells him that once her divorce comes through, she'll be free to marry him, as he has proposed. But when she learns that Jean controls the property and the money, she angrily suggests that David kill Jean so that he can inherit.

Patrick becomes protective of Jean and helps her discover her husband's latest affair, but after she confronts Valerie, David convinces her that the affair is over and he wants another chance. However, he now starts to make attempts on Jean's life – first by trying to push her down the open lift shaft in the house, but Patrick quickly closes the safety gate. Next David dissolves an overdose of sleeping pills in her glass of hot milk, but Patrick intervenes again, causing a loud alarm to ring each time Jean raises the doctored milk to her lips, which makes her realise that there is something wrong with it. David comes in later to see if she is dead yet.

Jean consults a solicitor in London about a divorce, but he tells her that her argument that a poltergeist is the only thing preventing David from murdering her "won't hold water" in court.

With Jean in London, David is free to have Valerie spend the night with him. Patrick takes the opportunity to punish them. As they're lying in bed, Patrick locks them in the bedroom and sets Four Winds on fire. When Jean returns later that night, having been driven home by her close friend and confidant Richard Foster, she learns that both David and Valerie have perished in the fire, trapped behind the bedroom's barred windows.

== Cast ==
- Tony Wright as David Linton
- Patricia Dainton as Jean Linton
- Sandra Dorne as Valerie Stockley
- Derek Aylward as Richard Foster
- Sam Kydd as Morris Lumley
- Llewellyn Rees as Webster
- Anita Sharp-Bolster as Mrs O'Brien
- Roddy Hughes as Daniels
- Harry Hutchinson as Pub Landlord
- Olive Sloane as Mrs Morris
- Geoffrey Denton as Police Inspector
- Olga Dickie as Hotel Proprietress

== Production ==
The film was produced by Merton Park Studios in the UK, but actually shot at Walton Studios in Walton-on-Thames, Surrey in May 1960. While making the film Wright was granted a divorce from his wife Janet Munro. Filming started 2 May. The novel was published after the film had been made but before it was released.

The House in Marsh Road was granted an A-certificate by the British Board of Film Censors on 26 July 1960. This meant that the film was considered to be more suitable for adults.

== Distribution ==
Theatrical distribution in the UK of The House in Marsh Road was by Grand National Pictures.

The film was never distributed theatrically in the US. But under the title Invisible Creature, it was released to television in 1964 as part of American International Television's Amazing '65 syndication package, an 'eclectic assortment of 65 genre features' sold to individual TV stations around the US. As such, the movie was 'one of the earliest AITV releases', and was given an on-screen copyright date of 1964 and listed as an Alta Vista Production 'with UK production' by Merton Park Studios. Invisible Creature was broadcast, for example, in the 1960s on WIIC-TV in Pittsburgh on the 'monster movie' programme Chiller Theater on 23 July 1966 and 2 August 1969. It was also shown on WFLD-TV in Chicago numerous times during the 1970s: on Screaming Yellow Theater on 27 October 1972 and 2 March 1973; on WFLD Chiller Theater on 29 June 1975, 4 April 1976 and 15 August 1976; and on Monstrous Movie on 16 April 1977.

More recently, the film was shown as The House in Marsh Road, its British title, on Talking Pictures TV in the UK on 11 October 2019.

The House in Marsh Road was teamed with The Monkey's Paw (1948) for video distribution in the UK by Video Renown Productions Ltd. The video was given a PG rating on 8 May 2013 under the 1985 ratings guidelines issued for videos by the British Board of Film Classification, which defines PG as 'Parental Guidance - general viewing but some scenes may be unsuitable for young children'.

== Critical reception ==
The Monthly Film Bulletin wrote: "This loosely contrived, amateurishly directed melodrama mixes attempted murder, adultery, domestic misery and the supernatural before blowing up in a pyrotechnic blaze. The suspense is modest; the acting of the three leads humble."

British film critic Phil Hardy is unimpressed by The House in Marsh Road, calling it 'a rather tame supernatural thriller' and describing Tully as 'a veteran of medium- and low-budget British programme fillers'. He notes, however, that instead of the people who usually do so in horror films, it is Patrick the poltergeist who 'appears to be responsible for the house catching fire during a storm, trapping the adulterous couple in the flames'.

American academic critic Rob Craig views the film in a more positive light. He calls it 'a cracking good drama with surprisingly adult themes', such as 'infidelity, alcoholism, paranoia and conspiracy'. And while it is 'essentially an old-fashioned ghost story', Craig writes that The House in Marsh Road 'comes to life due to an insightful screenplay, excellent characterizations and an abundance of atmosphere'. He also notes that the movie is perhaps one of the first to use the much-used-in-horror-films word 'poltergeist'.

Steve Chibnall and Brian McFarlane, also British critics, point out that the four-way relationship of Jean, Richard, David and Valerie is somewhat unusual for its time in that it shows them living 'at some remove from the safety of quotidian middle-class mores'. The film offers 'an unusually frank picture of a grim marriage (...) with a suggestion of adultery', they write, also noting that for 'a haunted house mystery', it is one 'with (not rare in British Bs) a downbeat ending'. They also noted Tony Wright has a 'statutory shirtless scene to sustain his beefcake image.'

Wheeler W. Dixon, an American academic critic, pays special attention to the 'grim conclusion' of The House in Marsh Road. He writes that 'in the stern moral universe the film inhabits, [David and Valerie's] violent deaths are seen as entirely deserved. Jean, it is implied, will move on through life with her new love, Richard'.

A reviewer at Britmovie writes that 'this entertaining and atmospheric low-budget feature rises above the standard expected from the much-maligned b-movie.'
