= Ticket to Paradise (1961 film) =

British film by Francis Searle

- Directed by: Francis Searle
- Written by: Max Kester; Brock Williams
- Produced by: Charles Leeds; Francis Searle
- Starring: Emrys Jones; Patricia Dainton; Vanda Hudson
- Cinematography: Ken Hodges
- Edited by: Jim Connock
- Music by: William Davies
- Production company: Bayford
- Distributed by: Eros Films
- Release date: 23 January 1961
- Running time: 61 minutes
- Country: United Kingdom
- Language: English

Ticket to Paradise is a 1961 British second feature romance film directed by Francis Searle and starring Emrys Jones, Patricia Dainton and Vanda Hudson. It was written by Max Kester and Brock Williams.

== Plot ==
Jack Watson, a clerk in a travel agency, is given a holiday to the fictitious Italian fishing village of Palmos. There he meets Mary Rillston, and romance blossoms. However, both mistakenly believe the other is wealthy, causing the romance to falter. Back in England, they meet again by chance, and love prevails.

== Cast ==
- Emrys Jones as Jack Watson
- Patricia Dainton as Mary Rillston
- Vanda Hudson as Gina
- Denis Shaw as Giuseppe
- Claire Gordon as Sybil
- Maureen Davis as Betty
- Raymond Rollett as Higginbottom
- Gretchen Franklin as Mrs. Higginbottom
- Sheila Bernette as Clarice
- Carlo Borelli as Batistano
- Nora Gordon as Mrs. Withers
- Geoffrey Denton as Baker

== Production ==
The film was shot at Walton Studios with sets designed by the art director Duncan Sutherland.

== Critical reception ==
Monthly Film Bulletin said "Embarrassingly cosy and well-worn comedy-romance, with a song number calling itself 'Dolce Mio' thrown in."

Kine Weekly wrote: "The picture, which titivates its central theme with North Country humour and teenage shenanigans, treads a popular, if well worn, path to its happy ending. Patricia Dainton pleases as Mary, Emrys Jones is adequate as Jack, and Vanda Hudson makes a curvacious Gina. ... As for the staging, the studio stuff and the authentic exteriors match up well, while 'Dolce Mio,' a catchy song number, is an added attraction."
