= Salute the Toff (novel) =

1941 novel

- Author: John Creasey
- Language: English
- Series: The Toff
- Genre: Crime Thriller
- Publisher: John Long Ltd
- Publication date: 1941
- Publication place: United Kingdom
- Media type: Print
- Preceded by: The Toff Breaks In
- Followed by: The Toff Proceeds

Salute the Toff is a 1941 crime thriller novel by the British writer John Creasey. It is the sixth in his long-running featuring the gentleman amateur detective The Toff.

== Adaptation ==
In 1952 it was made into a British film of the same title directed by Maclean Rogers and starring John Bentley, Carol Marsh and Valentine Dyall.

== Bibliography ==
- Goble, Alan. The Complete Index to Literary Sources in Film. Walter de Gruyter, 1999.
- Reilly, John M. Twentieth Century Crime & Mystery Writers. Springer, 2015.
