= Paul Temple's Triumph =

1950 British film by Maclean Rogers

- Theatrical release poster
- Directed by: Maclean Rogers
- Written by: Francis Durbridge (novel); A.R. Rawlinson
- Produced by: Ernest G. Roy
- Starring: John Bentley; Dinah Sheridan; Jack Livesey
- Cinematography: Brendan J. Stafford
- Music by: Stanley Black
- Distributed by: Butcher's Film Service
- Release date: May 1950
- Running time: 80 minutes
- Country: United Kingdom
- Language: English

Paul Temple's Triumph is a 1950 British second feature ('B') crime film directed by Maclean Rogers and starring John Bentley, Dinah Sheridan and Jack Livesey. It was the third in the series of four Paul Temple films made at Nettlefold Studios and was an adaptation by Francis Durbridge and A. R. Rawlinson of Durbridge's radio serial News of Paul Temple (1939). Temple is on the trail of a gang of international criminals trying to steal atomic secrets.

== Cast ==
- John Bentley as Paul Temple
- Dinah Sheridan as Steve Temple
- Jack Livesey as Sir Graham Forbes
- Beatrice Varley as Mrs. Weston
- Barbara Couper as Mrs. Morgan
- Jenny Mathot as Jacqueline Giraud
- Andrew Leigh as Professor Hardwick
- Hugh Dempster as Oliver Ffollett
- Dino Galvani as Van Draper
- Ivan Samson as Major Murray
- Bruce Seton as Bill Bryant
- Leo de Pokornoy as Dr. Steiner
- Michael Brennan as Hammond
- Joseph O'Conor as Inspector Crane
- Shaym Bahadur as Rikki
- Gerald Rex as Ernie
- Ben Williams as Mr. Weston
- Anne Hayes as Celia Hardwick
- Peter Butterworth as telephone engineer
- Hamilton Keene as an interested visitor
- Frederick Morant as doctor
- Jean Parker as nurse
- Denis Val Norton as 1st gangster
- Michael Hogarth as 2nd gangster

== Critical reception ==
In a contemporary review The Monthly Film Bulletin wrote: "A competently made and acted thriller, with pleasant New Forest locations."

TV Guide called it "an uninvolving series entry."

The Radio Times wrote: "perhaps too many scenes are staged in hotel rooms, but the plot rattles along, with Teutonic boffins, petrol smugglers, snooping reporters and French singers armed with doped cigarettes distracting the Temples from cracking the case."

In British Sound Films: The Studio Years 1928–1959 David Quinlan rated the film as “mediocre” and wrote: "Runs like a radio script on screen; no triumph for the famous sleuth this time.''
