= Dinah Sheridan =

British actress (1920–2012)

- Sheridan in 1950
- Born: Dinah Nadyejda Ginsburg; 17 September 1920; Finchley, Middlesex, England
- Died: 25 November 2012 (aged 92); Northwood, London, England
- Resting place: Northwood Cemetery, Northwood, London, England
- Education: Italia Conti Academy of Theatre Arts
- Occupation: Actress
- Years active: 1932–1954; 1965–1999
- Spouses: Jimmy Hanley (m. 1942; div. 1952); John Davis (m. 1954; div. 1965); John Merivale (m. 1986; died 1990); Aubrey Ison (m. 1992; died 2007)
- Partner: John Merivale (1968–1986)
- Children: 3, including Jeremy and Jenny Hanley

Dinah Sheridan (born Dinah Nadyejda Ginsburg; 17 September 1920 – 25 November 2012) was an English actress with a career spanning seven decades. She was best known for the films Genevieve (1953) and The Railway Children (1970), the long-running BBC comedy series Don't Wait Up (1983–1990), and for her distinguished theatre career in London's West End.

== Early life and career ==
Sheridan was born Dinah Nadyejda Ginsburg in Finchley, London, to Charlotte Lisa Ginsburg (née Everth; 1893–1966) and James Ginsburg (1893–1958).

Her father was born in Osaka, Japan, to a father of Russian descent. Her mother was born in Kew, Surrey, to parents of German descent. Her parents were photographers commissioned as "Studio Lisa" by the Queen Mother and her daughter Elizabeth II to photograph the royal family at such events as royal pantomimes. She was educated at Sherrardswood School in Welwyn Garden City, Hertfordshire and the Italia Conti Stage School.

In 1932, at the age of 11, she debuted professionally in Where the Rainbow Ends at the Holborn Empire. She changed her name to Dinah Sheridan, which she selected from a phone book, to play Wendy, at the age of 14, in a long-running theatrical production of Peter Pan starring Jean Forbes-Robertson. Sheridan became the first actress to play both Peter Pan and Wendy, touring between 1934 and 1936 and taking the show to Stratford-upon-Avon. Her parents changed their surname to Sheridan at the same time. Her first feature film was Give My Heart (1935). Other early films included Father Steps Out (1937) and her first starring role the following year in Irish and Proud of It. Stage appearances included Terence Rattigan's French Without Tears (1939, Oxford), J B Priestley's When We Are Married (1940, with Cyril Cusack, Llandudno) and The Golden Grain (1952, with Betty Balfour, Embassy Theatre, London).

== One of television's pioneers ==
Sheridan was one of the first actresses to appear on television in 1936 when the medium was in its infancy, and was interviewed on the BBC TV magazine programme Picture Page. The BBC had commenced the world's first regular-scheduled service that year from Alexandra Palace. Dinah's acting credits included appearing with Robert Helpmann in The Maker of Dreams (1937); and in Gallows Glorious, the first-ever three-act play on television (1938).

== Films ==
She postponed her film career to serve for two years as an ambulance driver at the start of World War II at Welwyn Garden City, where she participated in repertory theatre. After marrying Jimmy Hanley in 1942, she appeared in several films with him. Notable films in the 1940s were Salute John Citizen (1942), Get Cracking (1943, with George Formby), Murder in Reverse (1945, with Chili Bouchier), For You Alone (1945), and the lead roles in The Hills of Donegal (1948) and The Story of Shirley Yorke (1949). She played Jane Huggett in The Huggetts Abroad (1949) and appeared as "Steve Temple" in two Paul Temple films, Calling Paul Temple (1948) and Paul Temple's Triumph (1950).

She received wider recognition for her acting in 1951 as the game warden's wife in a film about African wildlife, Where No Vultures Fly. The film was notable for being largely shot on location in Africa. Although a fictional story, it was inspired by the events and life of Mervyn Cowie who had recently fought to establish the National Parks of Kenya. Given a Royal Premiere, it became one of the UK box office hits of the year and won the National Board of Review award (USA) for Foreign Film of the Year. Dinah followed this with playing the second female lead in the acclaimed The Sound Barrier (1952) directed by David Lean. The film was a popular and critical success, winning many awards including three BAFTAs, an Academy Award, a New York Critics Circle award and four National Board of Review awards. In interviews, Dinah spoke of how she was very happy to take a supporting role to Ann Todd in order to be directed by Lean. Sheridan then starred opposite Dirk Bogarde in Appointment in London (1952) and had a featured role as Grace Marston in The Story of Gilbert and Sullivan which was made as part of the Coronation celebrations of 1953. She was Britain's top female box-office star of 1953, according to the Motion Picture Herald's poll of film exhibitors. This issued a ranking of the 'Top Ten British Box-Office Stars' each year.

One of her enduringly popular roles was as Wendy McKim in the comedy Genevieve (1953), where her "comic instinct and control were precise and stylish". The film won a BAFTA, a Golden Globe and a National Board of Review award. Her other most memorable screen role was as Mrs Waterbury, the mother of the Railway Children in the famous film The Railway Children (1970). She made only one more cinema film after The Railway Children: The Mirror Crack'd (1980), which starred Elizabeth Taylor and Rock Hudson, with Angela Lansbury as Miss Marple. That role was an atmospheric cameo appearance with Anthony Steel and Nigel Stock in the 'film within a film' Murder at Midnight.

== Return to the stage ==
Sheridan's second husband, film executive John Davis, whom she married in 1954, insisted that she give up acting and stay at home with her children. After their 1965 divorce (which was granted to Sheridan on the grounds of cruelty, as reported in contemporaneous press coverage, and cited in obituaries including in The Times), she resumed her career appearing in Margaret Williams' comedy Let's All Go Down the Strand in 1967, alongside Gladys Cooper and Evelyn Laye, at the Phoenix Theatre.

Let's All Go Down the Strand began a prolonged period of success in London's West End, with Sheridan appearing in both comedic and dramatic roles for the next 25 years. She starred in Ronald Gow's A Boston Story (1968, opposite Tony Britton, Duchess Theatre); Ira Wallach's Out of the Question (1969, again opposite Dame Gladys Cooper, St Martin's Theatre), and in the title role of Ray Cooney's Move Over Mrs Markham (1972, again opposite Tony Britton, Vaudeville Theatre). She played the Countess of Chell in Waterhouse & Hall's The Card (1973, with Jim Dale, Queen's Theatre), and starred in Frances Durbridge's The Gentle Hook (1973, Yvonne Arnaud Theatre, Guildford, then Piccadilly Theatre), Samuel Taylor & Cornelia Otis Skinner's The Pleasure of His Company (1976 revival, starring opposite Douglas Fairbanks Jr., Phoenix Theatre), Agatha Christie's A Murder Is Announced (1977, opposite Dulcie Gray, Vaudeville Theatre), William Douglas Home's In The Red (1977, with Gerald Harper, Whitehall Theatre) and Noël Coward's Present Laughter (1981, with Donald Sinden and Gwen Watford, Vaudeville Theatre). The latter production was recorded and transmitted on BBC Television. During 1978/79, Sheridan starred opposite John Gielgud in Half Life which toured the UK, before they both took the play to Toronto, Canada.

Other theatre credits included Robert's Wife (1968, with future husband John Merivale at the Yvonne Arnaud Theatre), Softly, Goldfish Mating (1971, with Patrick Macnee, toured the UK), Touch of Purple (1972, Thorndike Theatre, Leatherhead), Don Taylor's Out on the Lawn (1975, with Edward Hardwicke, Rosemary Leach and T. P. McKenna, Watford Palace Theatre), Noël Coward's Star Quality (1982/83, with Emlyn Williams and Annette Crosbie amongst others, Theatre Royal Bath), George Bernard Shaw's The Apple Cart (1985/86, with Peter O'Toole and Susannah York, firstly in Bath, then transferred to the London's Theatre Royal Haymarket), and William Douglas Home's The Kingfisher (1992, Theatre Royal Bath and toured the UK).

Sheridan participated in A Talent To Amuse a gala evening production at the Phoenix Theatre, London, on 16 December 1969 which celebrated Noël Coward's 70th birthday. Sheridan and John Merivale were friends of Coward. Many stars appeared in the production, including John Gielgud, Anna Neagle, Richard Attenborough, Joyce Grenfell and Danny La Rue.

== Television ==
Having made television history by appearing in the first major TV play and being the first actor interviewee in the 1930s, Sheridan worked extensively in the medium later in her career. Roles included guest appearances in popular series of the time including Armchair Theatre (1969), Seasons of the Year (1971), Zodiac, Crown Court and Marked Personal (all during 1974), Village Hall (1975); Sykes (1979) and The Swish of the Curtain (1980).

Sheridan featured in several major television plays (in the BBC Play of the Month and Play for Today strands) most notably Oscar Wilde's An Ideal Husband (1969, with Margaret Leighton, Keith Michell, Jeremy Brett and Susan Hampshire); and John Galsworthy's Loyalties (1976, with Edward Fox amongst others). Both were produced by Cedric Messina and directed by Rudolph Cartier. In 1983 she made a guest appearance in the BBC science fiction television series Doctor Who as the Time Lady Chancellor Flavia in the 20th-anniversary special, "The Five Doctors".

She co-starred with long-standing friend and colleague Tony Britton and Nigel Havers in British sitcom, Don't Wait Up (1983–1990, BBC TV) which had audiences of over 15 million. She was a regular in the ITV series The Winning Streak (1985) and Just Us (1992), and the BBC comedy series All Night Long (1994). She made a memorable guest appearance as Dotty Mayhew in BBC TV's Lovejoy special The Prague Sun (1992), which also featured Donald Pleasence and Peter Vaughan. Her last role was in 1999 as Kathleen Gilmore in the Jonathan Creek television episode "Miracle in Crooked Lane".

When Sheridan was the subject of the British TV show This Is Your Life in 1979, guests in the studio included John Gielgud, Evelyn Laye, Douglas Fairbanks Jr., Betty Marsden and Charles Hawtrey, and filmed tributes from Dirk Bogarde and Tony Britton.

Sheridan died peacefully at her home in Northwood, London, on 25 November 2012, aged 92.

== Personal life ==
Sheridan married four times, divorcing twice and being made a widow twice: firstly to actor Jimmy Hanley (1942–1952), with whom she had three children, then to business executive John Davis (1954–1965), later to actor John Merivale (1986–1990, his death) and lastly to Aubrey Ison (1992–2007, his death). During her marriage to Ison, the couple lived in Palm Desert, California; following Ison's death, Sheridan returned to the UK in 2007.

Her son Jeremy Hanley became an accountant, Conservative Party Chairman, and government minister under John Major's administration. Her daughter Jenny Hanley became an actress and a co-presenter of the British television series Magpie. Another daughter died in infancy.

== Selected filmography ==
- Landslide (1937) – Dinah Shaw
- Behind Your Back (1937) – Kitty Hogan
- Father Steps Out (1937) – Helen Hardcastle
- Irish and Proud of It (1938) – Moira Flaherty
- Full Speed Ahead (1940) – Joan Barrymore
- Salute John Citizen (1942) – Evie
- Get Cracking (1943) – Mary Pemberton
- 29 Acacia Avenue (1945) – Pepper
- For You Alone (1945) – Stella White
- Murder in Reverse (1945) – Jill Masterick
- The Hills of Donegal (1947) – Eileen Hannay
- Calling Paul Temple (1948) – Steve Temple
- The Story of Shirley Yorke (1948) – Shirley Yorke
- The Huggetts Abroad (1949) – Jane Huggett
- Dark Secret (1949) – Valerie Merryman
- Paul Temple's Triumph (1950) – Steve Temple
- Blackout (1950) – Pat Dale
- No Trace (1950) – Linda
- Where No Vultures Fly (1951) – Mary Payton
- The Sound Barrier (1952) – Jess Peel
- Appointment in London (1952) – Eve Canyon
- The Story of Gilbert and Sullivan (1953) – Grace Marston
- Genevieve (1953) – Wendy McKim
- The Railway Children (1970) – Mrs. Waterbury
- The Mirror Crack'd (1980) – Lady Amanda Ridgeley
- Jonathan Creek (1999) - Kathleen Gilmore
