= Humphrey Lestocq =

British actor (1919–1984)

- Born: Humphrey Lestocq Gilbert; 23 January 1919; Chiswick, London, England
- Died: 29 January 1984 (aged 65); London, England
- Occupation: Actor

Humphrey Lestocq (23 January 1919 – 29 January 1984) was a British actor, best known for his roles in Angels One Five (1952) and The Long Shadow (1961), and guest appearances in the television series The Avengers.

Lestocq shot to fame as Flying Officer Kyte in the BBC radio wartime comedy Merry-Go-Round (1944–1948), which later evolved into Much-Binding-in-the-Marsh.

He was also the presenter of the TV series Whirligig, the first Saturday children's programme to be broadcast live from the BBC's Lime Grove Studios. It ran from 1950 to 1956. Calling himself "H.L.", he was the stooge of the puppet Mr. Turnip, voiced by Peter Hawkins. Lestocq's catchphrases were "Goody, Goody Gumdrops" and "Jolly D", and Mr. Turnip's was "Lawky, Lawky, Lum".

== Family ==
He was born Humphrey Lestocq Gilbert on 23 January 1919 in Chiswick, London, England. His parents were George Marx Gilbert and May Frances née Wooldridge, married 1911 in Brentford (Chiswick). They had three sons, George (1912), Maurice (1913), and Humphrey. He married Dallas E Edwards in 1943. They had two children – Michael (1945), and Patricia (1947). That marriage finished and Gilbert lived in common-law marriage with Mary Barnard Bilton until his death. After retiring from acting, he ran a fishing fleet from Rye Harbour, East Sussex. He was an avid collector of English silver coins. He died on 29 January 1984 in London.

Gilbert's mother came from a large family around Brentford, London. Her father was William Lestocq.

== Filmography ==
Year	Title	Role	Notes
1949	Stop Press Girl	Radio Commentator	
1950	Once a Sinner	Lewis Canfield	
1950	Fake's Progress	Commentator	
1951	Two on the Tiles	Jimmy Bradley	
1952	Angels One Five	Flight Lt. 'Batchy' Salter	
1952	Miss Robin Hood	Drunk Driver	Uncredited
1952	Come Back Peter	Arthur Hapgood	
1953	The Good Beginning	Thoroughgood	
1953	Meet Mr Lucifer	Arthur	
1954	Conflict of Wings	Sqd. Ldr. Davidson	
1958	The Son of Robin Hood	Blunt	
1959	Life in Danger	Inspector Bennet	
1960	Not a Hope in Hell	Cricklegate	
1961	The Unstoppable Man	Sgt. Plummer	
1961	The Long Shadow	Bannister	
1961	Two Wives at One Wedding	Mark	
1961	The Third Alibi	Producer	
1961	Pit of Darkness	Bill	
1961	The Court Martial of Major Keller	Lieutenant Cameron	
1962	The Golden Rabbit		
1962	Design for Loving	Club manager	
1962	Waltz of the Toreadors	Fox Hunter	Uncredited
1963	Bomb in the High Street	Reporter	
