= Jimmy Hanley =

English actor (1918–1970)

- Hanley as Leonard Parry in Little Friend (1934)
- Born: 22 October 1918; Norwich, England
- Died: 13 January 1970 (aged 51); Fetcham, England
- Years active: 1933–1968
- Spouses: Dinah Sheridan (m. 1942; div. 1952) Margaret Avery (m. 1955)
- Children: 6, including Jeremy Hanley and Jenny Hanley

Jimmy Hanley (22 October 1918 – 13 January 1970) was an English actor who appeared in the popular Huggetts film series, and in ITV's most popular advertising magazine programme, Jim's Inn, from 1957 to 1963.

== Early life ==
Born in Norwich, Norfolk, Hanley began his career as a child actor before becoming popular in juvenile roles. He was groomed by the Rank Studio system during his teenage years and earned film stardom as a "boy-next-door" type. The young actor attended the Italia Conti Academy of Theatre Arts and whilst he was studying there, made his stage debut at age 12 at the London Palladium, as John Darling in Peter Pan. He began to make films in his teens.

== Career ==
During the Second World War he served as an officer with the King's Own Yorkshire Light Infantry, and in a commando raid in Norway he was wounded in the leg and was invalided out of the service. He returned to films, including Salute John Citizen (1942), Henry V with Laurence Olivier (1944), For You Alone (1945) and the Huggetts films. He later worked on radio and TV, appearing in several television series and hosting the ITV series Jim's Inn from 1957 to 1963, which combined advertising messages with the plot of a soap opera, where he and his wife Maggie played the hosts of a pub where customers discussed bargains and new products whilst drinking. The series finished when advertising magazine programmes were banned.

== Personal life ==
Hanley was married twice:

- Dinah Sheridan 1942–1952 three children, including Jenny Hanley and the Conservative politician Sir Jeremy Hanley. The third died in infancy.
- Margaret Avery (1955–1970, three daughters: Jane, Sarah and Katy)

Hanley died from pancreatic cancer in Fetcham, Surrey, on 13 January 1970, at the age of 51.

== Selected filmography ==
- Red Wagon (1933) - Young Joe Prince
- Those Were the Days (1933) - Boy with bicycle (uncredited)
- Little Friend (1934) - Leonard Parry
- Wild Boy (1934) - Boy With Message (uncredited)
- Royal Cavalcade (1935) - Newsboy
- Boys Will Be Boys (1935) - Cyril Brown
- Brown on Resolution (1935) - Ginger
- The Tunnel (1935) - Geoffrey McAllan
- Landslide (1937) - Jimmy Haddon
- Cotton Queen (1937) - Jack Owen (uncredited)
- Night Ride (1937) - Dick Benson
- Housemaster (1938) - Travers
- Coming of Age (1938) - Arthur Strudwick
- There Ain't No Justice (1939) - Tommy Mutch
- Gaslight (1940) - Cobb
- Salute John Citizen (1942) - Ernest Bunting
- The Gentle Sex (1943) - 1st Soldier
- The Way Ahead (1944) - Pte. Geoffrey Stainer
- Henry V (1944) - Williams - Soldier in the English Army
- Kiss the Bride Goodbye (1945) - Jack Fowler
- 29 Acacia Avenue (1945) - Peter Robinson
- For You Alone (1945) - Dennis Britton
- Murder in Reverse (1945) - Peter Rogers
- The Captive Heart (1946) - Pte. Mathews
- Holiday Camp (1947) - Jimmy Gardner
- Master of Bankdam (1947) - Simeon Crowther Jr.
- It Always Rains on Sunday (1947) - Whitey
- Nothing Venture (1948) - Introduction to serial version
- It's Hard to Be Good (1947) - Captain James Gladstone Wedge VC
- Here Come the Huggetts (1948) - Jimmy Gardner
- The Huggetts Abroad (1949) - Jimmy Gardner
- Don't Ever Leave Me (1949) - Jack Denton
- Boys in Brown (1949) - Bill Foster
- The Blue Lamp (1950) - PC Andy Mitchell
- Room to Let (1950) - Curly Minter
- The Galloping Major (1951) - Bill Collins, Bus Driver
- Radio Cab Murder (1954) - Fred Martin
- Views on Trial (1954) - Nicholas Diabolus/Garble/Budgenot/foreman/machinist
- The Black Rider (1954) - Jerry Marsh
- The Deep Blue Sea (1955) - Dicer Durston
- Satellite in the Sky (1956) - Larry
- The Lost Continent (1968) - Patrick, the Bartender

=== Television series ===
- Jim's Inn (1957–1963, ITV advertising programme) - host
- Five O'Clock Club (1963–1966, ITV children's programme) - host
- Futurama (1964, ITV children's science programme) - host
- Crossroads (1966, ITV soap) - Jimmy Gudgeon, old friend of central character Meg Richardson (played by Noele Gordon)
