= 36 Hours (1953 film) =

1953 British film noir directed by Montgomery Tully

- Theatrical release poster
- Directed by: Montgomery Tully
- Written by: Steve Fisher (based on his novel)
- Produced by: Anthony Hinds
- Starring: Dan Duryea; Elsy Albiin; Ann Gudron; Eric Pohlmann; John Chandos
- Cinematography: Walter J. Harvey
- Edited by: James Needs
- Music by: Ivor Slaney; John Hollingsworth
- Production company: Hammer Film Productions
- Distributed by: Lippert Pictures (US); Exclusive Films (UK)
- Release date: 25 October 1954 (UK)
- Running time: 80 minutes (UK); 84 minutes (US)
- Country: United Kingdom
- Language: English

36 Hours, released in the United States as Terror Street, is a 1954 British film noir directed by Montgomery Tully and starring Dan Duryea. It was written by Steve Fisher based on his earlier novel 36 Hours and made by Hammer Film Productions. Jimmy Sangster was Assistant Director and J. Elder Wills was Art Director. Production began May 4, 1953 and finished in early June, and released in UK on Oct. 25, 1954.

== Plot ==
Bill Rogers, a US Air Force pilot, visits England to visit his estranged wife Katie. He finds details that suggest she has left him and is living a life that involves several male "friends". She shows up to meet him at her new flat, but then he is suddenly knocked unconscious from behind by a man named Orville Hart, who then kills Katie with Bill Rogers' own gun. When he awakes, he finds that his wife has been murdered and that he is the prime suspect. With only 36 hours at his disposal, Rogers has to track down the actual killer and prove his innocence with the help of a young lady he meets named Jenny Miller.

== Cast ==
- Dan Duryea as Major Bill Rogers
- Elsie Albiin as Katherine 'Katie' Rogers
- Gudrun Ure as Sister Jenny Miller
- Eric Pohlmann as Slauson, the smuggler
- John Chandos as Orville Hart
- Kenneth Griffith as Henry Slauson
- Harold Lang as Harry Cross, desk clerk
- Jane Carr as soup kitchen supervisor
- Michael Golden as the Inspector
- Marianne Stone as Pam Palmer
- Russell Napier as policeman (uncredited)
- Lee Patterson as Joe, pilot

== Reception ==
The Monthly Film Bulletin wrote: "The rather commonplace murder story loses much of its interest simply because Dan Duryea has not the look of a sympathetic character. The supporting cast is strong, however, and gives the story some conviction. The direction is somewhat showy; but the superficial gloss cannot cover up the defects of the script."

Kine Weekly wrote: "It strains at the leash at the start, but once it slips its collar it bounds through exciting channels to a satisfactory and thrilling climax. Dan Duryea, the American star, seizes all his chances and creates an essential air of mystery. Support and settings adequate."
