= Marjorie Westbury =

English radio actress and singer (1905–1989)

Marjorie Westbury (18 June 1905 – 16 December 1989) was an English radio actress and singer whose career lasted for more than fifty years. She is best remembered for voicing Louise 'Steve' Temple in the long-running BBC Radio series Paul Temple.

== Career ==
Born in Oldbury, Worcestershire, she studied Voice at the Royal College of Music in London between 1927 and 1930. During the 1930s, she made many radio broadcasts as a soprano from the BBC's studios in Birmingham. By the late 1930s, she had moved into acting as well as singing. This led in 1942 to a small part in Francis Durbridge's Paul Temple Intervenes.

In 1945, she took on the role of Paul's wife, Steve Temple, and continued to play the part until the radio serials came to an end in 1968. The surviving Paul Temple serials have been broadcast on BBC Radio 4 Extra.

While "Steve Temple" might have been her longest-lasting role, she was a very frequent radio actress into the 1970s and beyond. During the 1950s, she created the part of the (fictional) Austrian soprano Elsa Strauss in the Hilda Tablet series of radio plays by Henry Reed. In 1964, she played the part of the baby in a radio adaptation of Mervyn Peake's long poem The Rhyme Of The Flying Bomb. In 1983, she chose to celebrate the golden jubilee of her first appearance on radio by appearing as "Helen Lancaster" in N. C. Hunter's play, Waters of the Moon.

Westbury's career was mostly on radio with occasional films and theatre work. She died at her farmhouse in Maresfield, near Uckfield, Sussex on 16 December 1989, aged 84.

== Filmography ==
- 1964: The Finest Hours (as George Westbury – voice)
- 1975: The Girls of Slender Means (voice)

== See also ==
- Tale Spinners For Children
