= Olive Sloane =

English actress (1896–1963)

- Olive Sloane in Seven Days to Noon
- Born: 16 December 1896; London, England
- Died: 28 June 1963 (aged 66); London, England
- Occupation: Actress
- Years active: 1921-1963

Olive Sloane (16 December 1896 – 28 June 1963) was an English actress whose film career spanned over 40 years from the silent era through to her death. Sloane's career trajectory was unusual in that for most of her professional life she was essentially an anonymous bit part actress, and her best, most substantial roles did not come until relatively late in her career when she was in her 50s. Her most famous film appearance is the 1950 production Seven Days to Noon.

== Career ==
=== 1920s–1940s ===
Born in London in 1896, Sloane's first screen credit came in a 1921 silent film The Door That Has No Key produced by Frank Hall Crane, and there were five further appearances in silents up to 1925, including 1922's Trapped by the Mormons, a film which many decades later became a cult favourite with midnight film aficionados owing to its unintentionally ludicrous hilarity, and received a DVD release in the US in 2006. After 1925, there would be no further film appearance for Sloane until after the advent of talkies with 1933's The Good Companions. Details of Sloane's activities in the intervening years are sparse, but information retrieved places her working with a touring stage company in New Zealand in 1927.

After 1933, Sloane rapidly began to accumulate credits in British films. The majority of these were cheaply made quota quickies which immediately vanished into oblivion, but occasionally there was a higher-profile and more prestigious production such as the Gracie Fields star vehicle Sing As We Go (1934), in which she was credited as "Violet, the Song-Plugger's Girlfriend". However Sloane toiled mainly in insignificant roles in inferior films for many years, and it was not until towards the end of the 1940s, aged over 50, that she began to find her services in increasing demand, with a notable improvement both in the quality of films and size of roles being offered to her.

=== 1950–1963 ===
A minor role in Alfred Hitchcock's 1949 British production Under Capricorn was followed the next year by her most widely admired and best-known screen performance in the critically acclaimed Boulting Brothers-directed Seven Days to Noon, as Goldie Phillips, the woman who helps the desperate Professor Willingdon (Barry Jones). The character of Goldie was written as an ageing ex-chorus girl – brassy, excessively made-up and cheaply and gaudily dressed, whiling away her days gossiping and tippling in local public houses. Although not explicitly stated, the script strongly implied that Goldie relied on casual prostitution to make ends meet. With the open and unquestioning way in which she offered assistance and shelter to Willingdon, and her devotion to her little dog Trixie, Goldie came across as a cheerful, good-hearted soul and Sloane's performance earned much praise from critics for the mixture of humour and pathos she brought to Goldie's character, in a way that a younger or more glamorous actress would probably have failed to achieve.

The next few years brought roles for Sloane in other notable films. In an ensemble cast, she brought a poignant note to the theatre comedy Curtain Up (1952), as an actor whose best days are behind her encouraging an ingenue. She appeared in the 1953 Ealing Studios satire Meet Mr. Lucifer with Stanley Holloway and the 1954 prison drama The Weak and the Wicked, in which she played Nellie Baden, an elderly compulsive shoplifter sharing the cells with, amongst others, Glynis Johns and Diana Dors. 1955 brought the Richard Widmark heist thriller A Prize of Gold and 1957 the legal comedy Brothers in Law. Sloane's final credit came in the Peter Sellers satire Heavens Above!, released two weeks before she died in London on 28 June 1963, aged 66.

== Filmography ==
- The Door That Has No Key (1921) – Blossy Waveney
- Greatheart (1921) – Rose de Vigne
- Trapped by the Mormons (1922) – Sadie Keane
- Lord Arthur Savile's Crime (1922)
- Rogues of the Turf (1923) – Marian Heathcote
- The Dream of Eugene Aram (1923) – Mrs. Aram
- Money Isn't Everything (1925) - Elizabeth Tuter
- The Good Companions (1933) – Effie
- Soldiers of the King (1933) – Sarah Marvello
- Music Hall (1934) – (uncredited)
- Faces (1934) – Lady Wallingford
- Brides to Be (1934) – Phyllis Hopper
- Sing As We Go (1934) - Violet - The Song-Plugger's Girlfriend
- Key to Harmony (1935) - Nonia Sande
- Squibs (1935) - Barmaid (uncredited)
- Alibi Inn (1935) - Oueenie
- The Private Secretary (1935) - Impecunious bus passenger (uncredited)
- The Howard Case (1936) - Lena Maxwell
- In the Soup (1936) - Defendant (uncredited)
- It's Love Again (1936) - Francine Grenoble (uncredited)
- Café Collette (1937)
- Overcoat Sam (1937)
- Stardust (1938) - Gloria Dane
- Make It Three (1938) - Kate
- Inquest (1939) - Lily Prudence
- Tower of Terror (1941) - Florist
- Those Kids from Town (1942) - Vicar's Wife
- Let the People Sing (1942) - Daisy Barley
- Thunder Rock (1942) - Woman Director
- The Dummy Talks (1943) - (uncredited)
- The Voice Within (1946) - Fair Owner's Wife
- They Knew Mr. Knight (1946) - Mrs. Knight
- Send for Paul Temple (1946) - Ruby
- Bank Holiday Luck (1947)
- Counterblast (1948) - Ingram's Housekeeper (uncredited)
- The Guinea Pig (1948) - Aunt Mabel
- Under Capricorn (1949) - Sal
- Once a Sinner (1950) - Lil
- Waterfront (1950) - Mrs. Gibson
- Seven Days to Noon (1950) - Goldie
- The Tall Headlines (1952) - Mrs. Baker
- Curtain Up (1952) - Maud Baron
- My Wife's Lodger (1952) - Maggie Higginbotham
- Alf's Baby (1953) - Mrs. Matthews
- Meet Mr Lucifer (1953) - Mrs. Stannard
- The Weak and the Wicked (1954) - Nellie Baden, inmate
- The Golden Link (1954) - Mrs. Pullman
- Murder by Proxy (1954) - Landlady (uncredited)
- A Prize of Gold (1955) - Mavis
- The Man in the Road (1956) - Mrs. Lemmin - the Landlady
- The Last Man to Hang (1956) - Mrs. Bayfield
- Brothers in Law (1957) - Mrs. Newent
- Serious Charge (1959) - Mrs. Browning
- Wrong Number (1959) - Miss Crystal
- The Price of Silence (1959) - Landlady
- Your Money or Your Wife (1960) - Mrs. Withers
- The House in Marsh Road (1960) - Mrs. Morris
- Heavens Above! (1963) - Quarreling Housewife (final film role)
