= The Hills of Donegal (film) =

1947 film

- Theatrical release poster
- Directed by: John F. Argyle
- Screenplay by: John Dryden
- Produced by: John F. Argyle
- Starring: Margherita Stanley; Dinah Sheridan; James Etherington
- Edited by: Ted Richards
- Production company: Nettlefold Studios
- Release date: 5 January 1948
- Running time: 85 minutes
- Country: United Kingdom
- Language: English

The Hills of Donegal is a 1947 British second feature ('B') drama film directed by John Argyle and starring Dinah Sheridan, James Etherington and Moore Marriott. It was written by John Dryden.

== Plot ==
A young Irish woman abandons a promising career as singer to get married, only to discover that her husband is not the man she thought he was.

== Cast ==
- Dinah Sheridan as Eileen Hannay
- James Etherington as Michael O'Keefe
- Moore Marriott as Old Jake
- John Bentley as Terry O'Keefe
- Brendan Clegg as Paddy Hannay
- Irene Handl as Mrs. Mactavish
- Tamara Desni as Carole Wells
- Maire O'Neill as Hannah
- Robert Arden as Daniel
- Margherita Stanley as Gypsy dancer
- The Irish Gaelic Dancers
- Ian Wilson as opera stage director
- Wilfrid Brambell as ship's steward

== Reception ==
The Monthly Film Bulletin wrote: "The film suffers badly from overcrowding. So many side issues – gipsy revels, murder echoes from the past, jealous housekeeper, comic retainer, stage intrigue – make for disjointedness, whatever they may lend to local colour. There is a generous allowance of music, including the ballads "The Hills of Donegal", "Eily Mavourneen"', "The Harp that Once Thru' Tara's Halls", etc., a scene each from Traviata and The Bartered Bride, and some capable singing from James Etherington (Michael). The rest of the cast, led by Dinah Sheridan, John Bentley and Moore Marriott, cope loyally with what singing, dancing or romancing comes their way."

Kine Weekly wrote: "Naive, yet colourful musical melodrama, suggested by popular ballad. ... The plot is not exactly subtle, but James Etherington's fine singing and a wealth of expertly varied by-play more than atones for its various cliches."

Picture Show wrote: "Competently acted and directed."

In British Sound Films: The Studio Years 1928–1959 David Quinlan rated the film as "mediocre", writing: "Musical with all the predictable Irish songs ... and an overcrowded plot."

The Radio Times Guide to Films gave the film 2/5 stars, writing: "Melodramatic tarradiddle."

Chinball and McFarlane, writing in The British 'B' Film, called the film a "dim Irish-set musical".
