= Len Harris (cinematographer) =

British cinematographer and camera operator (1916–1995)

Len Harris(1916–1995) was a British cinematographer and camera operator.

== Selected filmography ==
- Once a Sinner (1950)
- My Wife's Lodger (1952)
- Further Up the Creek (1958)
- Gaolbreak (1962)
