= Dial 999 (1955 film) =

Crime drama directed by Montgomery Tully

- US theatrical release poster
- Directed by: Montgomery Tully
- Written by: Montgomery Tully
- Based on: the novel, The Way Out by Bruce Graeme
- Produced by: Alec C. Snowden
- Starring: Gene Nelson; Mona Freeman; John Bentley
- Cinematography: Phil Grindrod
- Edited by: Geoffrey Miller
- Music by: Richard Taylor
- Production company: Todon Productions
- Distributed by: Anglo-Amalgamated (UK); RKO Radio Pictures (US)
- Release dates: December 1955 (UK): 11 April 1956; (US)
- Running time: 89 minutes (Dial 999); 78 minutes (The Way Out)
- Country: Great Britain
- Language: English

Dial 999 (U.S title: The Way Out ) is a 1955 British B movie crime drama film directed and written by Montgomery Tully and starring Gene Nelson, Mona Freeman and John Bentley. It was based on the novel of the same name by Bruce Graeme. Produced by Todon Productions, it was shot at the Merton Park Studios in London. RKO Radio Pictures purchased the rights to distribute it in the United States, where it was released in cut form on 11 April 1956.

== Plot ==
Greg Carradine tells his wife Terry that he has accidentally killed a man during a drunken fight. Terry tries to hide Greg, despite finding out that he in fact deliberately killed the man – a bookmaker to whom he owed money. Wanted by the police, Greg tries to flee the country via "The Way Out", a secret escape route for criminals. But he panics, and the police catch up with him.

== Cast ==
- Gene Nelson as Greg Carradine
- Mona Freeman as Terry Carradine
- John Bentley as Det. Sgt. Seagrave
- Michael Goodliffe as John Moffat
- Sydney Tafler as Cressett
- Charles Victor as Tom Smithers
- Paula Byrne as Vera Bellamy
- Michael Golden as Inspector Keyes
- Arthur Lovegrove as George
- Charles Mortimer as Harding
- Cyril Chamberlain as Anderson
- Tony Sympson as Harry Briggs
- Jack McNaughton as plainclothes officer
- Michael Duffield as fingerprint man
- Patrick Newell as 1st brewer's man
- Kay Callard as blonde
- Peter Welch as plainclothes officer
- Margaret Harrison as Policewoman Larkins
- Kenneth Midwood as radio operator
- Clifford Buckton as Alf
- Frank Forsythe as 1st police constable
- Frank Hawkins as 2nd police constable
- Walter Gotell as policeman
- Harry Lane as Bob
- Barbara Roscoe as model

== Production ==
The film was a production of Todon, the company of Donna Reed and her husband Tony Owen.

== Critical reception ==
The Monthly Film Bulletin wrote: "An uninspired and novelettish thriller, taken at such a slow pace that not even the final chase develops any real excitement. Mona Freeman cannot do much with the loyal wife, and Gene Nelson is inclined to overplay as the thoroughly unlikable Greg."

Kine Weekly wrote: "There are a few inconsistencies In Its script, but most of the players are on their toes and vital teamwork leads to genuine heart throbs, plus ultimate tension. ... The picture stretches credulity to the full, but, despite the fact that the behaviour of some of its leading characters is a little odd and that the police give them too much rope, it furnishes moving and exciting thick thick ear."

In British Sound Films: The Studio Years 1928–1959 David Quinlan rated the film as "good", writing: "Seat-gripper thriller whose tension increases nicely."
