= Murder by Proxy =

1954 British film by Terence Fisher

- Theatrical release poster
- Directed by: Terence Fisher
- Written by: Richard Landau
- Based on: Murder by Proxy (novel) by Helen Nielsen
- Produced by: Michael Carreras
- Starring: Dane Clark; Belinda Lee; Betty Ann Davies
- Cinematography: Walter J. Harvey; Len Harris
- Edited by: Maurice Rootes
- Music by: Ivor Slaney
- Production company: Hammer Film Productions
- Distributed by: Exclusive Films; Lippert Pictures (US)
- Release dates: 21 May 1954 (US); 28 March 1955 (UK)
- Running time: 87 minutes
- Country: United Kingdom
- Language: English

Murder by Proxy (U.S. title: Blackout) is a 1954 British 'B' film noir crime drama film directed by Terence Fisher for Hammer Films and starring Dane Clark, Belinda Lee and Betty Ann Davies. The film was based on the 1952 novel Murder by Proxy by Helen Nielsen. The film was first released in the United States by Lippert Pictures on May 21, 1954, and later released in the UK by Exclusive on March 29, 1955. This was the first of an eight-picture deal between Hammer and Lippert Productions signed on September 24, 1954. Production began on September 28, 1954. Jimmy Sangster was assistant director, J. Elder Wills was Art Director and Phil Leakey handled Makeup. Belinda Lee died at age 25 in a car crash, ending a promising career.

== Plot ==
Drunk and down-and-out Casey Morrow in London is approached by a young and beautiful heiress, Phyllis Brunner, offering him much money if he will marry her. He accepts, but then wakes up the next morning in some other woman's apartment with blood on his coat from the murder of Ms. Brunner's father with a fire poker. Now he must unravel the mystery to clear his name, which leads him into a twisted labyrinth of encounters with various suspicious characters who seem to make his situation worse the more he learns.

== Cast ==
- Dane Clark as Casey Morrow
- Belinda Lee as Phyllis Brunner
- Betty Ann Davies as Mrs. Alicia Brunner
- Eleanor Summerfield as Maggie Doone
- Andrew Osborn as Lance Gordon
- Harold Lang as Travis / Victor Vanno
- Jill Melford as Miss Nardis
- Alvys Maben as Lita Huntley
- Michael Golden as Inspector Johnson
- Nora Gordon as Casey's mother
- Alfie Bass as Ernie
- Delphi Lawrence as Linda
- Arnold Diamond as Mrs. Brunner's butler
- Cleo Laine as singer
- Olive Sloane as landlady

== Production ==
Dane Clark's casting was announced in September 1953. This was the 2nd of three films he starred in for Hammer. He stayed on in England to make Five Days (1954).

The film was shot at Hammer's Bray Studios in Berkshire with sets designed by the art director J. Elder Wills.

Script supervisor Renee Glynne later recalled that Belinda Lee "was still very inexperienced at that time and I had to watch her quite carefully. She'd cross her legs the wrong way or turn her head at the wrong moment or come out with the wrong line, so I'd have to correct her and try to help her out. Dane obviously fancied her and got very cross with my professional interference. He got quite nasty and was actually pushing me away from her." Glynne says she had to take medication "in order to survive the rest of the film. After that I had to give all my instructions to him through the director, Terry Fisher ... after some shots he'd have to put his head under cold water because he was so enraged that I was even there. Eventually he realised how silly it all was and went down on his knees, tears streaming down his face, begging me to forgive him. But I still asked Tony Hinds to take me off the next film he was in."

== Reception ==
The Monthly Film Bulletin wrote: "The treatment is sufficiently persuasive to bring a fair amount of excitement to the well tried material. Dane Clark, playing with effective restraint, makes a credible character out of the bail hero, aided by Eleanor Summerfield as the wisecracking Maggie Doone. Belinda Lee's voluptuous charms are more stimulating than her acting. Technically the film is competently made, and the dialogue is agreeably convincing."

Variety called it "a gabby, overlong, import from England that has Dane Clark heading the cast as the only name known in the domestic market. Condition of the supporting feature market is such currently that the film will have no trouble getting bookings, even though it offers scant measure of entertainment.... There's nothing the players can do with the plot as presented under the production helming of Michael Carreras, and Terence Fisher's direction is deliberate to the extreme, even for a British offering."

In British Sound Films: The Studio Years 1928–1959 David Quinlan rated the film as "average", writing: "Grim, slightly dull thriller with some witty lines along the way."

Chibnall and McFarlane in The British 'B' Film described the film as: "a pretty hackneyed story."

Filmink called it "an entirely decent, unpretentious film noir; the age gap between the leads is annoying, but Lee is an ideal femme-fatale-or-isn't-she?"
