= Michael Golden (actor) =

Irish actor (1913–1983)

- in Hungry Hill (1947)
- Born: 15 August 1913; Bray, County Wicklow, Ireland
- Died: 1983 (aged 69); Hastings, East Sussex, England
- Occupations: Stage actor film actor television actor
- Years active: 1942–1979

Michael Golden (15 August 1913 – 1983) was an Irish stage, film and television actor, mainly active in England. His stage work encompassed Shakespearean roles at Stratford in 1947; and as police inspectors in the original West End productions of Agatha Christie's plays Verdict and The Unexpected Guest in 1958.

== Selected filmography ==
- A Canterbury Tale (1944) - Sergt. Smale
- Send for Paul Temple (1946) - Dixie
- Hungry Hill (1947) - Sam Donovan
- Escape (1948) - Detective Penter
- Calling Paul Temple (1948) - Frank Chester
- Noose (1948) - Moggie
- Another Shore (1948) - D.O. Broderick
- The Blue Lamp (1950) - Mike Randall (uncredited)
- Pool of London (1951) - Customs Officer Andrews
- Cry, the Beloved Country (1951) - Second reporter (uncredited)
- Salute the Toff (1952) - Benny Kless
- The Gentle Gunman (1952) - Murphy
- The Square Ring (1953) - Warren
- Operation Diplomat (1953) - Harrison
- 36 Hours (1953) - The Inspector
- Murder by Proxy (1954) - Inspector Johnson
- The Green Scarf (1954) - Warder
- The Black Rider (1954) - Rakoff
- Track the Man Down (1955) - 'Wild' Max (uncredited)
- Cross Channel (1955) - W.L. Carrick
- Dial 999 (1955) - The Chief Inspector
- Women Without Men (A.K.A. Blonde Bait) (1956) - Bargee
- Up in the World (1956) - Nightclub Doorman (uncredited)
- The Man Without a Body (1957) - Nostradamus
- Date with Disaster (1957) - Det. Inspector Matthews
- The One That Got Away (1957) - First Detective (uncredited)
- Tread Softly Stranger (1958) - St. John's Ambulance Man
- Robbery with Violence (1958) - Inspector Wilson
- During One Night (1960) - Constable
- The Day They Robbed the Bank of England (1961) - Gamekeeper (uncredited)
- Murder, She Said (1961) - Hillman

=== Television roles ===
- Jude the Obscure (1971) - as Tinker Taylor
- Fall of Eagles (1974) - Putilov
- The Onedin Line (1976) - Storeman

== Selected stage roles ==
- The Gentle Gunman (1950) - Shinto
- Verdict (1958) - Detective Inspector Ogden
- The Unexpected Guest (1958) - Inspector Thomas
