= Montgomery Tully =

Irish film director and writer (1904–1988)

- Montgomery Tully
- Born: Geoffrey Montgomery Tully; 6 May 1904; Dublin, Ireland
- Died: 10 October 1988 (aged 84)
- Education: University of London
- Occupations: Film director, screenwriter

Montgomery Tully (6 May 1904 – 10 October 1988) was an Irish film director and writer.

== Film career ==
Born in Dublin, Tully studied at the University of London, and originally entered the film industry as a director of documentaries. Later, Tully worked on low-budget British films, and is mostly known for his crime dramas. He worked several times for Anglo Amalgamated and British National.

One of his films, No Road Back (1957), featured Sean Connery in a very early role. His last film, The Terrornauts, was made in 1967. He also worked in television, directing episodes of shows including Edgar Wallace Mysteries, Kraft Mystery Theatre, Man from Interpol and Fabian of the Yard.

== Partial filmography ==
- Waltz Time (1945)
- Murder in Reverse (1945)
- Spring Song (1946)
- Mrs. Fitzherbert (1947)
- Boys in Brown (1949)
- A Tale of Five Cities (a.k.a. A Tale of Five Women ) (1951)
- Girdle of Gold (1952)
- Small Town Story (1953)
- 36 Hours (a.k.a. Terror Street) (1953)
- The Diamond (a.k.a. The Diamond Wizard) (1954)
- Five Days (a.k.a. Paid to Kill) (1954)
- Devil's Point (a.k.a. Devil's Harbor) (1954)
- The Glass Cage (a.k.a. The Glass Tomb) (1955)
- Dial 999 (a.k.a. The Way Out) (1955)
- The Counterfeit Plan (1957)
- No Road Back (1957)
- The Key Man (a.k.a. Life at Stake) (1957)
- The Hypnotist (a.k.a. Scotland Yard Dragnet) (1957)
- Man in the Shadow (a.k.a. Violent Stranger) (1957)
- The Diplomatic Corpse (1958)
- Escapement (a.k.a. The Electronic Monster) (1958)
- The Strange Awakening (a.k.a. Female Fiends) (1958)
- The Long Knife (1958)
- Man with a Gun (1958)
- I Only Arsked! (1958)
- Man Accused (1959)
- The Price of Silence (1959)
- Jackpot (1960)
- The Man Who Was Nobody (1960)
- Dead Lucky (1960)
- The House in Marsh Road (a.k.a. Invisible Creature) (1960)
- Two Wives at One Wedding (1961)
- The Third Alibi (1961)
- Middle Course (1961)
- She Knows Y'Know (1962)
- Out of the Fog (a.k.a. Fog for a Killer) (1962)
- Clash by Night (a.k.a. Escape by Night) (1963)
- Master Spy (1963)
- Who Killed the Cat? (1966)
- The Terrornauts (1967)
- Battle Beneath the Earth (1967)
