= Patricia Dainton =

British actress (1930–2023)

- Born: Margaret Bryden Pate; 12 April 1930; Hamilton, Lanarkshire, Scotland
- Died: 31 May 2023 (aged 93)
- Education: Italia Conti Academy of Theatre Arts
- Occupation: Actress
- Years active: 1947–1961

Patricia Dainton (born Margaret Bryden Pate; 12 April 1930 – 31 May 2023) was a British actress who appeared in a number of films and television roles between 1947 and 1961.

== Early years ==
Margaret Bryden Pate was born in Hamilton, Scotland, the daughter of film and stage agent Vivienne Black. She left Scotland at age ten, moving to London. She attended the Italia Conti Academy of Theatre Arts in London and the Cone school of dance.

== Stage ==
After her stage debut at Stratford-upon-Avon, Dainton acted in the suburbs of London, with roles in Babette, Watch on the Rhine, Quiet Wedding, and A Midsummer Night's Dream.

== Film ==
Dainton made her film debut in 1942 in The Bells Go Down, in an unnamed role. Dainton's "dancing and acting debut in Technicolor" came in The Dancing Years, with her first notable film role being in Dancing with Crime (1947). She trained at the Rank Organisation's "charm school". Her twin brother, George Bryden, also made a couple of film and stage appearances during this period.

As well as appearing in over a dozen film roles, Dainton starred in ITV's Sixpenny Corner, the UK's first daily soap. She appeared in 179 episodes between 1955 and 1956.

In 2016, fifty-five years after her last film role, Dainton attended the 2nd Renown Festival of Film, and provided introductions to her films in An Afternoon with Patricia Dainton on her 86th birthday, for Talking Pictures TV.

== Personal life and death ==
Dainton was married to the actor turned producer Norman Williams. They had four children.

Dainton died on 31 May 2023, at the age of 93.

== Filmography ==
- The Bells Go Down (1943) (uncredited)
- Dancing with Crime (1947) (uncredited)
- Uncle Silas a.k.a.The Inheritance (1947) (uncredited)
- Love in Waiting (1948) (uncredited)
- A Piece of Cake (1948) (uncredited)
- Don't Ever Leave Me (1949)
- The Dancing Years (1950)
- Castle in the Air (1952)
- Hammer the Toff (1952)
- Paul Temple Returns a.k.a. Bombay Waterfront (1952)
- Tread Softly (1952)
- Operation Diplomat (1953)
- No Road Back (1957)
- The Passionate Stranger a.k.a. A Novel Affair (1957)
- At the Stroke of Nine (1957)
- Witness in the Dark (1959)
- The House in Marsh Road a.k.a. Invisible Creature (1960)
- The Third Alibi (1961)
- Ticket to Paradise (1961)

== Television roles ==
- The Boltons Revue (TV Special) (1948) – Performer (as Pat Dainton)
- The Song in the Forest (TV Movie) (1950) – Baroness Mary Vetsera
- The Inch Man (TV Series), "The Big Gamble" (1951) – Gloria Renshaw
- Sixpenny Corner (TV Series) 179 episodes (1955–1956) – Sally Norton
- White Hunter (TV Series), "Out of the Wind" and "Deadfall" (1958) – Doctor Ann Clements / Louise
