= John Bentley (actor) =

British actor (1916–2009)

- Born: 2 December 1916; Sparkhill, Birmingham, Warwickshire, England
- Died: 13 August 2009 (aged 92); Petworth, West Sussex, England
- Years active: late 1930s–1976
- Spouse: Joyce Barrett (1944 – 1955) (divorced) 1 child

John Bentley (2 December 1916 – 13 August 2009) was a British film actor. He had a successful career as a leading man from the 1940s to the late 50s and was a popular heart-throb who appeared in many British B-movies during that time. Later in his career, in the 1970s he appeared as Hugh Mortimer, Meg Richardson's ill-fated third husband in the English soap opera Crossroads. He also starred in the jungle adventure series African Patrol (1957) as Chief Inspector Paul Derek and made various other guest appearances in many popular TV series from the late 50s onwards.

John Bentley was also an accomplished singer and stage actor.

== Early life and career ==
Born in Sparkhill, Birmingham in 1916, Bentley was brought up by his mother after his father, a furniture retailer, died when he was a toddler. He came to acting quite by chance, in his own words:

Apart from the odd school play, I had very little interest in the theatrical world until I was sixteen and that was quite by accident. I got into the business through radio producer Martyn C. Webster. On one of his radio broadcasts he offered listeners to come to his studio and audition. Those who were good enough would be offered work at the station. I actually decided that I would be quite a good singer, so armed with a 78 record to accompany my performance, I sang for Martyn. He liked what he heard and offered me a part in a radio musical. And that is where the singing evolved into acting. Other radio dramas soon followed thankfully.

As a result of singing for Webster, he was given the joint leading role in a radio musical, backed by the BBC Midland Orchestra and Chorus. He worked for Radio Luxembourg in the late 1930s as an announcer, and in 1940 made his West End stage debut in the variety show New Faces at the Comedy Theatre with Judy Campbell and Charles Hawtrey (of Carry On... fame).

== Film career ==
After the war he started his film career playing Terry O'Keefe in the low-budget musical romance The Hills of Donegal in 1947. The film was produced at Nettlefold Studios in Walton-on-Thames and financed by Butcher's Film Service. Bentley went on to do several other films in the same vein with Butcher's at Nettlefold, most of them being completed in less than a week. Three based on Francis Durbridge's "Paul Temple" the amateur detective (Calling Paul Temple in 1948, Paul Temple's Triumph in 1950 and Paul Temple Returns in 1952) were released at the same time as a popular radio series. Similarly, Salute the Toff and Hammer the Toff were produced in 1952 in which Bentley played amateur sleuth Richard Rollison.

In 1950 he had a supporting role in the main feature comedy The Happiest Days of Your Life playing schoolteacher Richard Tassell alongside Alistair Sim, Margaret Rutherford and Joyce Grenfell. Following many other "B" films in the 1950s there were appearances in Hollywood films – as a police detective in Istanbul (1957), one of Errol Flynn's last films, and Submarine Seahawk (1958) as a naval officer. However he hated Hollywood, saying people were judged on how much they earned rather than their ability and subsequently returned to the UK, where he was offered the lead role of "Inspector Paul Derek" in the TV series African Patrol filmed entirely on location in Kenya. This ran for 39 episodes that were shown on ITV in 1958–59.

In 1961 he acted alongside Dirk Bogarde and John Mills in The Singer Not the Song, and in 1962 in one of his last films he starred as Mike Andrews in the thriller The Fur Collar.

== Television career ==
In the later 1960s and 1970s Bentley featured in soap opera Crossroads as Hugh Mortimer, third husband of the motel owner Meg Richardson, played by Noele Gordon. There was a previous connection with Gordon, who had presented the daytime TV magazine programme Lunch Box, popular in the 1950s, in which Bentley regularly appeared as a guest singer. Lunch Box was produced by Reg Watson who was part of the Crossroads team. This connection gave him the offer of the part of Mortimer.

In the soap Hugh Mortimer was a millionaire businessman who arrived in 1965 and started romancing the widowed Meg. They were engaged twice, but he eventually married Jane Templeton, while Meg became the wife of Malcolm Ryder, who later tried to murder her. When Hugh's wife died, he renewed his interest in Meg and gave Crossroads one of its biggest audiences, for 1975's television wedding of the year. Eighteen million viewed the episode and there were thousands lining the streets of Birmingham when the blessing was filmed in Birmingham Cathedral. The couple were chauffeured by the comedian Larry Grayson, a close friend of Noele Gordon. Two years after the wedding he was written out of the series via a terrorist attack; he said that the script writers did not know what to do with his part following the marriage.

After leaving Crossroads, Bentley returned to the stage including a starring role as the English literature professor in a tour of Educating Rita, but by the early 1990s he had retired as a result of breaking an ankle on stage, which subsequently caused arthritis.

== Personal life ==
Bentley was married twice. He and his first wife were divorced in 1955. He married again in 2003; he and his wife lived in Petworth, West Sussex until his death in 2009 at the age of 92.

== Selected filmography ==
- The Hills of Donegal (1947) – Terry O'Keefe
- Calling Paul Temple (1948) – Paul Temple
- Bait (1950) – DuCane
- Torment (1950) – Jim Brandon
- The Happiest Days of Your Life (1950) – Richard Tassell
- Paul Temple's Triumph (1950) – Paul Temple
- She Shall Have Murder (1950) – Douglas Robjohn
- Salute the Toff (1952) – The Honourable Richard Rollison
- The Woman's Angle (1952) – Renfro Mansell
- Hammer the Toff (1952) – The Honourable Richard Rollison
- The Lost Hours (1952) – Clark Sutton
- Paul Temple Returns (1952) – Paul Temple
- Tread Softly (1952) – Keith Gilbert
- Men Against the Sun (1953) – Hawker
- Black Orchid (1953) – Eric Blair
- Golden Ivory (1954) – Paul Dobson
- River Beat (1954) – Dan Barker
- The Scarlet Spear (1954) – District Officer Jim T. Barneson
- Double Exposure (1954) – Pete Fleming
- Profile (1954) – Peter
- Final Appointment (1954) – Mike Billings
- Confession (1955) – Detective Inspector Kessler
- Stolen Assignment (1955) – Mike Billings
- The Flaw (1955) – Paul Oliveri
- Dial 999 (1955) – Det. Sgt. Seagrave
- Count of Twelve (1955) – Dr. Lawrence (episode "Blind Man's Bluff")
- Flight from Vienna (aka Escape from the Iron Curtain) (1956) – Capt. Philip J. Lawton
- Run for the Sun (1956) – Jim Harrison
- Istanbul (1957) – Insp. Nural
- Submarine Seahawk (1958) – Lt. Cmdr. Paul Turner
- Sacred Waters (1960) – Lemmy, ein Engländer
- The Singer Not the Song (1961) – Police Captain
- Mary Had a Little... (1961) – Dr. Malcolm Nettel
- The Sinister Man (Edgar Wallace Mysteries) (1961) – Superintendent Wills
- The Fur Collar (1962) – Mike Andrews
- Shadow of Treason (1963) – Steve
