= John Argyle =

British screenwriter, film producer and director (1911–1962)

- Born: 6 March 1911; Tamworth, Staffordshire, United Kingdom
- Died: December 1962 (aged 51); Salisbury, Rhodesia
- Occupation(s): Film director Film producer

John Argyle (1911–1962) was a British screenwriter, producer and film director.

== Selected filmography ==
Director

- The Last Tide (1931)
- Paradise Alley (1931)
- The Final Reckoning (1932)
- This Man Is Dangerous (1941)
- Send for Paul Temple (1946)
- The Hills of Donegal (1947)

Producer

- Love's Old Sweet Song (1933)
- Variety (1935)
- Wanted by Scotland Yard (1937)
- My Irish Molly (1938)
- Tower of Terror (1941)
