= Send for Paul Temple =

Calling Paul Temple
- Directed by: John Argyle
- Written by: Francis Durbridge (novel); John Argyle
- Produced by: John Argyle
- Starring: Anthony Hulme; Joy Shelton; Tamara Desni
- Distributed by: Butcher's Film Service
- Release date: 23 December 1946
- Running time: 83 minutes
- Country: United Kingdom
- Language: English

Send for Paul Temple is a 1946 British crime film directed by John Argyle and starring Anthony Hulme, Joy Shelton and Tamara Desni. Paul Temple is called in by Scotland Yard after a major diamond theft. It was the first of four film adaptations of the BBC's Paul Temple radio serials, with John Bentley taking over the lead role in future installments.

The film is an abridged version of the first ever Paul Temple radio serial, originally broadcast in April and May 1938 over eight episodes, also entitled Send for Paul Temple. The radio script was by Francis Durbridge, who immediately collaborated with a co-author, John Thewes, on a novelisation, published in June 1938. ('John Thewes' is thought to be a pseudonym of Charles Hatton, who collaborated with Durbridge on four subsequent novelisations of radio scripts up until 1948). The original radio script was used again in 1940 for a remade radio production using a Canadian cast, starring Bernard Braden.

Much of the 200 minute nominal duration of the radio production was discarded in abridging the story to fit the film's much shorter 83 minute running time, with the plot heavily truncated and considerably simplified. In his adaption, the director John Argyle reused the names of characters and places from the novel and radio script, and recycles some plot ideas and situations, and the basic storyline; but a comparison with the extant 1940 Canadian radio production reveals (unsurprisingly, since five of the eight radio episodes have been omitted) that little of Durbridge's original dialogue, characterisation or detailed plotting survives. Durbridge's trademark ability to construct his radio dramas around the seven cliffhanger endings in his multipart serials is entirely lost.

== Story ==
A pair of criminals, who are part an organised criminal syndicate known as the Midlands Gang, arrive by a black saloon car outside a jewellers shop in Derby and commit a daring daylight robbery stealing £4000 worth of jewellery. Whilst escaping they shoot and kill a police officer trying to stop them.

Another pair of criminals then break into another jewellers stealing £8000 worth of jewellery. The police arrive and in his dying breath, the night watchman mentions "The Green Finger".

The Morning Mercury newspaper prints an article wondering if novelist and criminologist Paul Temple should be called to assist Scotland Yard in the investigation of the Midland Gang.

Meanwhile, Paul Temple is at home in Bramley, and is entertaining his neighbour Dr. Milton and his niece Diana Thornley, when his butler Ricky announces that Chief Inspector Harvey of Scotland Yard has arrived. Dr. Milton and his niece leave and Chief Inspector Harvey tells Paul Temple of his concerns over the recent crimes by the Midland Gang. Chief Inspector Harvey tells Paul Temple he is staying at a local pub called the Little General and Paul Temple invites him to stay at his house.

Paul Temple drives Chief Inspector Harvey to the pub to retrieve his things and on the way they discus Chief Inspector Dale and the comment by the Night watchman about the Green Finger.

Paul Temple waits in the car for Chief Inspector Gerald Harvey, and speaks to barmaid, and hears a gun shot. The pub landlord Horace Daley, rushes out and tells Paul Temple that Chief Inspector Harvey has shot himself. Paul Temple enters the pub and calls for the police. After speaking to Horace Daley he speaks to a lady staying at the pub, Miss Amelia Marchment, who researches old English inns and tells Paul Temple that the Old General was originally called the Green Finger. Dr. Milton and the local police Sergeant Morrison and a constable arrive to secure the scene. Horace Daley covers the body of Chief Inspector Harvey and whilst alone speaks to Dr, Milton.

Steve Trent, a female reporter from London arrives at Paul Temple's house to conduct an interview with him just as he arrives home with Sergeant Morrison. She tells Paul Temple that her brother was Chief Inspector Harvey. Steve Trent is shocked to learn of her brother's death and Paul Temple invites her to stay.

Paul Temple takes Steve Trent to the morgue to identify her brother Gerald. They discuss the circumstances and Steve Trent reveals her name to be Louise Harvey and is using an alias to protect her identity. She reveals that her brother had previously worked for the police in Cape Town, South Africa with another officer, Sidney Bellman and had been investigating a criminal organisation using the same method, led by a mysterious figure known as the Knave of Diamonds also known as Max Lorraine. Max Lorraine has a small scar on his right elbow and smokes Russian cigarettes with a girlfriend called Ludmilla. Sidney Bellman was murdered and Max Lorraine disappeared. Paul Temple agrees to help find the killer of her brother.

Steve and Paul go horse riding near the Little General and whilst talking notice Horace Daley releasing pigeons from the pub.

In Leamington a lorry, driven by a criminal called Skid Tyler, loses control and drives into a jewellers whilst Diana Thornley is speaking to a police officer. Whilst police are dealing with the accident, another criminal, Dixie, pretends to call for an ambulance and steals £5000 worth of jewellery.

Inspector Merritt telephones Paul Temple to inform him of the circumstances and Chief Inspector Dale speaks to him on behalf of the Commissioner.

Sir Graham Forbes discusses the case with Paul Temple and requests his help whilst Skid Tyler is interviewed. Skid Tyler agrees to talk and whilst being interviewed is poisoned and dies. Miss Marchment then arrives for an appointment with Sir Graham Forbes and reveals Steve Trent's identity.

Sir Graham conducts a briefing with the investigation team, revealing that the jewellery is being flown out by pigeon from the Little General pub. It is decided that the next day K division will raid the pub in the evening.

K division conduct the operation and find Horace Daley murdered. A code is found written PENG.

Miss Neddy telephones the pub and speaks to police and tells them Steve Trent is abducted. Miss Marchment gets access to the basement and reveals that PENG is short for the First Penguin, a local pub. She is revealed to be Mrs Bellman who is trying to track down the murderer of her husband Sidney Bellman.

Dixie and Snow, criminals who are part of the Midlands Gang, drive to the First Penguin and are happy that it was the last job and meet Dr. Milton and his niece. One of the criminals, Snow is poisoned. Steve Trent witnesses Dr. Milton disposing of Snow's body. Dixie knows that his drink is poisoned and offers Dr. Milton the drink. Diana offers to drink the poison and throws the drink in Dixie's face. Dr. Milton puts Dixie in a cupboard. Miss Marchant arrives and declares she is there to see Miss Trent. Paul Temple and Steve Trent arrive and give the gun to Miss Marchant. A telephone rings and the call is traced to Paul Temple's house. Paul and Steve return to his house and leave Miss Marchment in charge. Miss Marchment asks for the name of Max Lorraine. Dixie wakes up and attacks Miss Marchment. Whilst Paul and Steve are driving, they are shot at by Dixie in another car. They manage to force his car off the road and Dixie dies from his injuries.

Sir Graham Forbes finds that the telephone wires have been cut at Paul Temple's house. A message is sent through a window . Paul Temple instructs the police to guard the First Penguin.

Paul and Steve arrive at the First Penguin revealing that Ludmilla is Diana Thornley. Max Lorraine arrives and is revealed to be masquerading as Chief Inspector Norman Dale whom he murdered and assumed his identity. Miss Marchment is found tied up in a cupboard.

Steve and Paul drive off together to get married.

== Cast ==
- Anthony Hulme ... Paul Temple
- Joy Shelton ... Steve Trent
- Tamara Desni ... Diana Thornley
- Jack Raine ... Sir Graham Forbes
- Beatrice Varley ... Miss Marchmont
- Hylton Allen ... Dr. Milton
- Maire O'Neill ... Mrs. Neddy
- Philip Ray ... Horace Daley
- Olive Sloane ... Ruby
- Melville Crawford ... Inspector Harvey
- Michael Golden ... Dixie
- Norman Pierce ... Sgt. Morrison
