= Jim Connock =

English film editor (1925–1991)

Jim Connock (5 June 1925 – 29 June 1991) was an English film editor.

== Selected filmography ==
- Salute the Toff (1952)
- Hammer the Toff (1952)
- Paul Temple Returns (1952)
- Before I Wake (1955)
- Guilty? (1956)
- The Man in the Road (1956)
- The Surgeon's Knife (1957)
- The Diplomatic Corpse (1958)
- The House in Marsh Road (1960)
- Jackpot (1960)
- Freedom to Die (1961)
- Ticket to Paradise (1961)
- Follow That Man (1961)
- Dead Man's Evidence (1962)
- Gaolbreak (1962)
- Emergency (1962)
- Night of the Prowler (1962)
- Danger by My Side (1962)
- The Marked One (1963)
- Slaughter High (1986)
