= Wilfred Burns =

British film score composer

Wilfred Burns (1917 – 25 September 1990) was a British composer of film scores.

Burns was born Bernard Wilfred Harris. He was severely wounded in World War 2 in 1940. Shot in the left elbow, right hand and left eye, he eventually recovered from his injuries and remained a POW until repatriated on medical grounds in 1943. His recovery involved dealing with the complete loss of his left eye along with restoring vision to his right. The injury to his left elbow left that arm shorter than his right and the injury to his right hand required therapy to restore strength and dexterity to the fingers. After recuperation in several German prison hospitals he was able to play the piano again.

== Selected filmography ==
- Something in the City (1950)
- There Is Another Sun (1951)
- Madame Louise (1951)
- Emergency Call (1952)
- Paul Temple Returns (1952)
- There Was a Young Lady (1953)
- Marilyn (1953)
- Forces' Sweetheart (1953)
- The Broken Horseshoe (1953)
- The Black Rider (1954)
- The Love Match (1955)
- Not So Dusty (1956)
- Assignment Redhead (1956)
- Man from Tangier (1957)
- Them Nice Americans (1958)
- The Hand (1960)
- Enter Inspector Duval (1961)
- A Question of Suspense (1961)
- Ambush in Leopard Street (1962)
- Breath of Life (1963)
- Delayed Flight (1964)
- The London Nobody Knows (1967)
- Till Death Us Do Part (1969)
- Love Is a Splendid Illusion (1970)
- Dad's Army (1971)
- Adolf Hitler: My Part in His Downfall (1973)
