= Walton Studios =

Former British film studios

- Interactive map of the Walton Studios area
- Former names: Hepworth Studios; Nettlefold Studios

General information
- Type: Film studios
- Location: Hepworth Way, Walton-on-Thames, Surrey, United Kingdom
- Coordinates: 51.385819°N 0.423419°W
- Opened: 1899
- Closed: 1961
- Owner: Hepworth Pictures (1899-1926); Archibald Nettlefold (1926-1947); Ernest G. Roy (1947-mid-1950s); Sapphire Films (mid-1950s-1961)

Walton Studios, previously named Hepworth Studios and Nettlefold Studios, was a film production studio in Walton-on-Thames in Surrey, England. Hepworth was a pioneering studio in the early 20th century and released the first film adaptation of Alice's Adventures in Wonderland (Alice in Wonderland, 1903).

The decline of the British cinematic production industry in the mid-20th century led to a decline in work for the facility, and after failing to financially survive as a television production outlet it was eventually closed in 1961. The studio was subsequently demolished and the land was sold for house-building.

== History ==
Cecil Hepworth leased a house for £36 per annum in Hurst Grove, Walton-on-Thames, in 1899, and established Hepworth Studios. The film recording studio he built included electric lighting and a film laboratory. Along with his cousin Monty Wicks, Hepworth created the filmmaking production company Hepwix, and began producing actualities, which were newsreel-like short documentary films. A 15 ft by 8 ft stage was also constructed in the house's back garden. By the turn of the 20th century Hepworth was making 100 films a year.

By 1905, Hepworth built a larger glass stage and began producing trick films as well as filmed material in other genres. In 1907 the studio was wrecked by a fire, which killed a member of staff. The studio continued production through the First World War, producing short propaganda films to support the war effort. During the early stages of that war, the studios were used to make films featuring the American star Florence Turner.

In 1923 Cecil Hepworth's Hepworth Picture Plays company which operated at the studio declared bankruptcy, due in part to the increasing competition from rival film companies. All of the original film negatives in Hepworth's possession were melted down by the receiver in order to sell the constituent silver, and thus Hepworth's entire back catalogue of 2,000 films was destroyed, a historical disaster in which 80% of British films made between 1900 and 1929 were lost for ever.

=== Nettlefold Studios ===
The studio was purchased by Archibald Nettlefold in 1926, and renamed Nettlefold Studios; it began producing comedy silent films, until it was upgraded to sound production with the advent of sound film in the early 1930s. The 1930s saw the studio mainly producing what were known in the industry as "Quota Quickies", an inadvertent consequence of the provisions in the Cinematograph Films Act 1927 that were intended to protect Britain's cinematic production industry from the commercial threat of Hollywood films.

During the Second World War, the studio's buildings were requisitioned by the government and used as a storage facility for the war effort, and the Vickers-Armstrong Aircraft Company built two new aircraft construction hangars on the site in order to reinforce and disperse its production capacity, following damage by enemy bombing attacks at its factory site at Brooklands, Weybridge, on 4 September 1940. Archibald Nettlefold died in 1944, and when the studio reopened after the war it was sold in 1947 to Ernest G. Roy.

The British film industry, declining after the Second World War, could support only a few domestically made films in the late 1940s and 1950s, on modest budgets. To keep the studio afloat financially and to maintain its operation, an 'open door' hiring policy was initiated, where the studio's facilities were made available to hire for non-sited companies, which led to a contract being signed with Columbia Pictures, and American actors working in the studio's facilities including eminent film figures such as Douglas Fairbanks Jr., Bette Davis, and Rock Hudson.

=== Walton Studios ===
In 1955 Sapphire Films, owned by the American producer Hannah Weinstein, rented the studio, and subsequently bought it from Ernest R. Roy, renaming it as The Walton Studios. Sapphire Films productions at the facility, all shown on ITV, began with The Adventures of Robin Hood (143 episodes) in the late 1950s for Lew Grade's ITC. Other Sapphire/ITC television series were also produced on the site, including The Adventures of Sir Lancelot (1956), The Buccaneers (1956), Sword of Freedom (1957) and The Four Just Men (1959).

== Closure and demolition ==
At the start of the 1960s, the studio ran into serious difficulty with its financing. Unable to compete with other television studio production facilities, it ceased trading and was closed permanently in March 1961. Most of its equipment was sold to the nearby Shepperton Studios, and some of its 200 former employees transferred there.

The majority of the studio's buildings were demolished in the early 1960s and the site was sold for house building. Today, all that remains of the studio is the power generating house, originally built by Hepworth, which was converted into a theatre in 1925. It was known for some years as the Walton Playhouse, subsequently the Cecil Hepworth Playhouse, and is a performing arts venue for hire.

== Selected filmography ==
=== Hepworth era ===
- 1900: The Beggar's Deceit
- 1900: How It Feels to Be Run Over
- 1900: Explosion of a Motor Car
- 1903: Alice in Wonderland
- 1905: Rescued by Rover
- 1905: Baby's Toilet
- 1913: David Copperfield
- 1915: The Baby on the Barge
- 1916: Annie Laurie
- 1919: City of Beautiful Nonsense
- 1919: Broken in the Wars
- 1919: The Forest on the Hill
- 1920: Helen of Four Gates
- 1921: The Narrow Valley
- 1921: Tansy
- 1921: Wild Heather
- 1923: Comin' Thro the Rye
- 1923: Mist in the Valley

=== Nettlefold era ===
- 1951: Madame Louise
- 1951: Scrooge
- 1952: The Pickwick Papers
- 1952: Escape Route
- 1952: The Man Who Watched Trains Go By
- 1953: Albert R.N.
- 1953: House of Blackmail
- 1953: Forces' Sweetheart
- 1954: Before I Wake (1955 film) (U.S. title: Shadow of Fear)
- 1954: River Beat
- 1955: Stock Car
- 1955 Track the Man Down'
- 1955: Escapade
- 1955: Miss Tulip Stays the Night
- 1956: A Touch of the Sun
- 1956: The Weapon
- 1956: Radio Cab Murder

=== Walton Studios era ===
- 1956: Bond of Fear
- 1957: The Naked Truth
- 1958: Tread Softly Stranger
- 1959: Don't Panic Chaps!
- 1959: The Navy Lark (film)
- 1959: Cover Girl Killer
- 1960: Beyond the Curtain
- 1960: Mary Had a Little...
- 1961: During One Night
