= Butcher's Film Service =

British film company

Opening credits, Send for Paul Temple (1946)

Butcher's Film Service was a British film production and distribution company that specialised in low-budget productions. The company was founded by William Butcher, a chemist from Blackheath. The company survived through several production slumps in the British film industry and two World Wars.

In later years the company mainly released films made at the Nettlefold Studios in Walton-upon-Thames in Surrey. Amongst the films produced after the Second World War was a series of four Paul Temple films and The Story of Shirley Yorke which proved to be a surprise hit. The company attempted to give its films a patriotic and populist appeal, and were particularly aimed at working-class audiences in industrial areas. In 1954 it was renamed Butcher's Film Distributors.

In the 1970s it was primarily distributing pornographic films. In 1982 it distributed the sci fi film Inseminoid.

== Selected filmography ==
- East Is East (1916 film)
- Grim Justice (1916)
- The Princess on Broadway (1927) starring Pauline Garon, Johnny Walker, Ethel Clayton, and Dorothy Dwan
- Send for Paul Temple (1946)
- The Story of Shirley Yorke (1948)
- The Hi-Jackers (1963)

== Bibliography ==
- Low, Rachael. The History of the British Film, 1918-1929. George Allen & Unwin, 1971.
- Chibnall, Steve & McFarlane, Brian. The British 'B' Film. Palgrave MacMillan, 2009.
