= World of Wonder (magazine) =

Educational magazine for children

World of Wonder was a British educational magazine for children published by IPC's Fleetway Publications (formerly Amalgamated Press) from 1970 to 1975. It was launched under the editorship of Robert Bartholomew with a cover price of 1/6 on 28 March 1970, and it replaced the earlier title, Tell Me Why. It was printed and published in the Netherlands.

The magazine was similar in content to Look and Learn, which the company had been publishing for eight years, and shared many of its best artists, including Angus McBride, C. L. Doughty, Dan Escott, Richard Hook, Roger Payne, Severino Baraldi and Wilf Hardy. Like its sister publications, World of Wonder was aimed at both boys and girls. It included history, science, geography and literature, serialised stories, as well as names and addresses of children wanting pen pals. The magazine sold all over the English-speaking world (other than the US), with readers in Australia, Ireland, Malaysia, South Africa, and New Zealand.

The masthead of the magazine proclaimed "Every Monday," but the cover date of the first issue of the magazine was 28 March 1970 (a Saturday, in fact), and actually appeared on sale in shops on Monday, 23 March 1970. Issue number 2 came out on the following Good Friday, 27 March 1970. In January 1971, World of Wonder incorporated the older children's magazine, Treasure (from issue 44), and the title ran until 1 March 1975, when it was itself swallowed by the longer running and more successful Look and Learn. World of Wonder ran for a total of 258 issues, joining Look and Learn on its issue 686, when a number of its more popular features continued in the new combined 40-pager.

In the mid-1980s American filmmakers Fenton Bailey and Randy Barbato used the World of Wonder name for their record company, which later evolved into World of Wonder Productions, a company known for programmes such as RuPaul’s Drag Race.
