= Treasure (magazine) =

Treasure was a British educational magazine for young children published by Fleetway Publications which ran for 418 issues published between 19 January 1963 and 16 January 1971. The editor was Arthur Bouchier.

== Features and style ==
Treasure was heavily illustrated in both colour and black & white, the first issue introducing many of the features that were to be popular over the coming years. 'Mr Answers' (actually staff editor Edward Northcott) answered children's questions on subjects as diverse as 'Why do the leaves fall off the trees in autumn?' to 'Why was Tower Bridge built to open?'; 'Peeps Into Nature' was a regular nature page; 'How It Happens' began with an explanation of how the post office worked; 'A Picture to talk about' covered a wide variety of subjects from a visit to a pantomime to a children's hospital; 'Tales from Many Lands' was a series of fairy tales from around the world; and a regular story featuring Tufty Fluffytail, the squirrel created to make children aware of road safety. Other features included 'Adventure Stories from the Bible', 'The Wonderful Story of Britain', illustrated primarily by Peter Jackson, and various puzzle pages.

=== Series ===
Two long-running series debuted in the first issue:

- A series of text stories featuring the worldwide travels of 'Wee Willie Winkie', a young boy who has a 'special green ticket' which allows him to travel free on any form of transport. Befriending a young elephant named Hannibal, Willie journeys across Europe, Africa, Australia and America. The stories were illustrated by John Worsley and Robert Hodgson.
- The comic strip 'Princess Marigold' which featured the fairy tale adventures of the inhabitants of Marigold Land.

=== Classics ===
Treasure also included a number of illustrated children's classics, including The Borrowers by Mary Norton, The Wind in the Willows by Kenneth Grahame, The Water Babies by Charles Kingsley, Pinocchio by Carlo Collodi, Gulliver's Travels by Jonathan Swift, Alice in Wonderland Alice Through the Looking Glass by Lewis Carroll and The Wonderful Adventures of Baron Munchhausen. The front and back cover were cleared for fourteen weeks to serialise JM Barrie's "Peter Pan" in a comic strip format in 1966.

=== Companion titles ===
Companion titles included Treasure Annual (1963–75), a series of 6 'Treasure Book of Animals' (1966–71), the Treasure Book of Answers (1970) and Treasure Book of Princess Marigold (undated).

== Artists ==
Amongst the artists who worked on Treasure were Clive Uptton, Phillip Mendoza, Nadir Quinto, C. L. Doughty, Wilf Hardy, Jesus Blasco, Colin Merrett, Luis Bermejo, John M. Burns and Gerry Haylock.

== History ==
In January 1971, Treasure was incorporated into World of Wonder, which a few years later was itself incorporated into Look and Learn.

In November 2004, Treasure was purchased by Look and Learn Magazine Ltd.
