= Ronald Lampitt =

Ronald George Lampitt (16 March 1906 – October 1988) was an English artist. He produced illustrations for books and magazines, particularly those for children, and designed posters for railway companies.

== Life ==
Lampitt was born in Worcester in 1906, the eldest of three sons of Roland Edward Lampitt and Florence (née Pope). He was self-taught as an artist. He painted in oil and in watercolour.

During the Second World War he worked in RAF Intelligence; this is thought to have influenced his subsequent work showing aerial views of landscapes and towns.

He produced illustrations for children's magazines, including Modern Wonder, Look and Learn and Treasure; and other periodicals including Illustrated, The Passing Show, and John Bull, to which he contributed from the 1940s to its closure in the 1960s, often providing its cover picture.

He collaborated with his brother-in-law, the journalist Henry Deverson, with work including the series "Mainly for Children" published by The Sunday Times. From 1965 to 1972 Lampitt produced the artwork for nine Ladybird Books.

He produced travel posters for Great Western Railway, Southern Railway, London, Midland and Scottish Railway and British Railways.

Lampitt lived for many years in Sidcup, and he married in 1938 Mona Deverson; they had two daughters. He died in 1988, aged 82.
