= Madame Louise =

1951 British film by Maclean Rogers

- Richard Hearne, Petula Clark & Garry Marsh
- Directed by: Maclean Rogers
- Screenplay by: Michael Pertwee
- Based on: the play Madame Louise (1945) by Vernon Sylvaine
- Produced by: Ernest G. Roy
- Starring: Richard Hearne; Petula Clark; Garry Marsh
- Cinematography: Wilkie Cooper
- Edited by: Charles Hasse
- Music by: Wilfred Burns
- Production company: Nettlefold Films
- Distributed by: Butcher's Film Service (UK)
- Release date: 1 October 1951 (UK)
- Running time: 88 minutes
- Country: United Kingdom
- Language: English

Madame Louise (also known as The Madame Gambles), is a 1951 British comedy film directed by Maclean Rogers and produced by Ernest G. Roy, starring Richard Hearne, Petula Clark, Garry Marsh and Richard Gale. It is loosely based on the 1945 play Madame Louise by Vernon Sylvaine.

== Plot summary ==
In order to settle her debts, the owner of a dress shop transfers control to a bookmaker, Mr Trout. Trout is wanted by a gang of criminals and much mayhem follows, causing the usual stunts by Mr Pastry. He has patented a dress, modelled by the resourceful assistant Miss Penny, which can be transformed from a day dress to an evening dress and other modes by the removal of the sleeves and part of the skirt. A good deal of slapstick is involved, with Hearne's acrobatic agility being much in evidence. All is well at the end of the film as the dress shop owner recovers her business (due to Mr Pastry's incompetence) and Pastry is rewarded by being made her business partner.

== Cast ==
- Richard Hearne as Mr Pastry
- Petula Clark as Miss Penny
- Garry Marsh as Mr Trout
- Richard Gale as Lieutenant Edwards
- Doris Rogers as Mrs Trout
- Hilda Bayley as Madmoiselle
- Charles Farrell as Felling
- Robert Adair as bookmaker
- Anita Sharp-Bolster as cafe proprietress
- Vic Wise as Curly
- Harry Fowler as Trout's clerk
- John Powe as Dumbo
- Pauline Johnson as Pearl
- Mavis Greenaway as mannequin
- Pat Raphael as mannequin
- Doorn Van Steyne as mannequin
- Mackenzie Ward as business man
- Gerald Rex as messenger

== Critical reception ==
The Monthly Film Bulletin wrote: "This is not a particularly good comedy even of its type; it may amuse firm Mr. Pastry fans but Petula Clark is completely wasted in a coy love affair".

Today's Cinema wrote: "The production word, if unpretentious, is competent; and the experienced hand of Maclean Rogers has kept the action moving fast and furiously. A pleasant little film successfully aimed at the vast market for unsophisticated British comedy...Richard Hearne virtually carries the whole film, which owes all its best moments to his unflagging agility."
