= John Worsley (artist) =

British artist and illustrator

- Born: John Godfrey Bernard Worsley; 16 February 1919; Liverpool, England
- Died: 3 October 2000 (aged 81); England
- Education: St Winifred's boarding school, Brighton College, Goldsmiths
- Occupations: Artist, Midshipman, Illustrator
- Writing career
- Genre: Children's books
- Notable works: P.C. 49, Belle du Ballet, John Worsley's War

John Godfrey Bernard Worsley (16 February 1919 – 3 October 2000) was a British artist and illustrator best known for his naval battle scenes and portraits of high-ranking officers and political figures. One of the very few active service artists of the Second World War, Worsley was the only person to render contemporary sea-warfare in situ, and the only official war artist captured by the Germans. Detained in the infamous prisoner-of-war camp Marlag O, Worsley documented prison life with supplies provided by the Red Cross, his expertise employed in the forging of identity papers, and an ingenious escape attempt requiring the construction of a mannequin named Albert R.N.

During his lifetime, Worsley was president of the Royal Society of Marine Artists: sixty-one of his paintings – including portraits of Field Marshal Montgomery, and the First Sea Lord, Sir John Cunningham – hang in the Imperial War Museum, with another twenty-nine pictures archived in the collections of the National Maritime Museum.

== Life ==
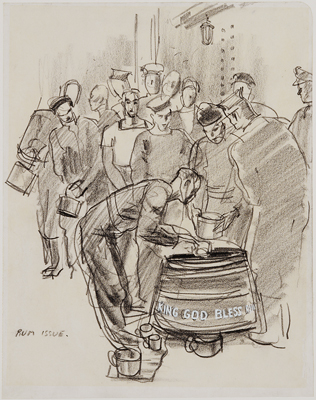
"Rum Issue": sketch by John Worsley

Worsley spent his childhood on a coffee farm in Kenya, his family having emigrated from Liverpool just six months after his birth. In 1928 he was sent back to England and was enrolled in St. Winifred's boarding school, from where Worsley won a scholarship to Brighton College, after which he spent three years studying fine art at Goldsmiths' School of Art. After graduating, in 1938, Worsley secured work as a commercial illustrator, mainly working on romance magazines.

At the start of World War Two, Worsley joined the Royal Navy and spent three years on convoy escort duty in the Atlantic and the North Sea. During that period, Worsley served on HMS Laurentic, HMS Lancaster and HMS Devonshire. Worsley was aboard the Laurentic when it was torpedoed and sunk in November 1940. Worsley's painting of that incident, based on sketches he made at the time in an open lifeboat, plus his drawings of wartime life at sea, gained the attention of Kenneth Clark – the director of the War Artists' Advisory Committee –who appointed him as one of the two full-time artists attached to the Commander-in-Chief's staff, Malta.

In 1943, the Navy dispatched Worsley to an island in the north Adriatic, where he hoped to record an attempt by Allied saboteurs to establish a base camp, but the Germans intercepted his party, forcing them to surrender.

As a prisoner, Worsley documented camp life with warmth, accuracy, and humour. He also directed his talent to covert pursuits, including the creation of counterfeit documentation, and Albert, an ingenious life-size figurine, crafted from newspaper, a wire frame, and human hair. The figurine had blinking ping-pong ball eyes that were powered by a pendulum made from a sardine tin. For four days, Albert successfully deceived the prison guards, masquerading as an officer during roll-call, while the lieutenant he had replaced made good his escape. However, the escapee was eventually recaptured, and Albert was hidden for the next escape.

After the war, Worsley remained under Naval engagement, painting portraits of high-ranking officers for the Admiralty, before securing a commission for the popular children's weekly, Eagle, and its companion paper, Girl, achieving his greatest success with The Adventures of P.C. 49, a comic strip featuring the exploits of a British constable. Aside from illustrating comics, periodicals, and advertisements – including a series of army recruitment posters out of the Boy's Own mould - Worsley also assisted the Metropolitan Police; his ability to draft from description secured the capture of the nurse implicated in the notorious London baby-snatch of 1990.

By 1970, Worsley entered the arena of family entertainment, rendering hundreds of large plates for televised adaptations of The Wind in the Willows, Treasure Island, A Christmas Carol, and The Little Grey Men, later released as large-format prints for children. During his lifetime, he illustrated over forty books, concluding with a record of his exploits during the Second World War. Worsley died on 3 October 2000 at the age of 81.

A collection of his wartime sketches, found in his studio after his death, was displayed by his stepdaughter on a special edition of the BBC television programme Antiques Roadshow on 8 September 2019, marking 80 years since the start of World War II. At that time, they remained in the ownership of his family.

== Selected works ==
=== Biography ===
- Worsley, John; Giggal, Kenneth (1993). John Worsley's War: An Official War Artist in World War II. Shrewsbury: Airlife. ISBN 978-1-85310-257-8.

=== Illustrations ===
- Guy Morgan (1945), P.O.W., Whittlesey House, McGraw-Hill Book Company Inc. (ISBN 978-0545047746)
- Guy Morgan (1945), Only Ghosts can Live, Crosby Lockwood & Son
- Stephen MacFarlane (pseud. John Keir Cross) (1946), Detectives in Greasepaint, Peter Lunn
- John Keir Cross (1946), Studio 'J' Investigates, Peter Lunn
- Robert Harling (1946), The Steep Atlantick Stream, Chivers, Chatto & Windus (ISBN 978-0855949341)
- The Illustrated London News (ed. Sir Bruce Ingram) (1949)
- Eric Romilly (1949), Bleeding from the Roman, Chapman & Hall
- Thomas Cubbin, with an introduction by Henry Major Tomlinson (1950), The Wreck of the Serica, Dropmore Press
- Eagle Annual Number 2 (1953) (ed. Marcus Morris), Hulton Press
- Eric Phillips and Alan Stranks (1953), P.C. 49 "Eagle" Strip Cartoon Book, Preview Publications (UK) Ltd
- Alan Stranks (1954), P.C. 49 "Eagle" Strip Cartoon Book Number 2, Andrew Dakers Ltd
- Alan Stranks (1954), On the Beat with P.C. 49, Preview Publications (UK) Ltd
- Alan Stranks (1955), PC 49 Annual, Andrew Dakers Ltd
- Roderick Langmere Haig-Brown (1949), Saltwater Summer, Collins (ISBN 978-0001831292)
- George Beardmore (1956), Belle of the Ballet's Gala Performance, Hulton Press
- George Beardmore (1957), Belle of the Ballet's Country Holiday, Hulton Press
- George Beardmore (1958), Scandale a la Cour, Dargaud
- George Beardmore (1958), Le Secret De La Ballerine, Dargaud
- Ships (1962), Watson-Guptill Publications
- John Gordon Williams (1963), God in the Space Age, Church Information Office
- Macdonald Hastings (1971), Sydney the Sparrow, Ward Lock (ISBN 978-0706312911)
- Robert Louis Stevenson's Treasure Island, retold by Jane Carruth (1975), Golden Press (ISBN 978-0307147509)
- Johanna Spyri's Heidi, retold by Jane Carruth (1975), Award (ISBN 978-0861630677)
- Anna Sewell's Black Beauty, retold by Jane Carruth (1975), Award (ISBN 978-0861630660)
- Alexandre Dumas' The Three Musketeers, retold by Jane Carruth (1976), Award (ISBN 978-0861630684)
- Mark Twain's Tom Sawyer, retold by Jane Carruth (1977), Award (ISBN 978-0861631322)
- R.D. Blackmore's Lorna Doone, retold by Jane Carruth (1979), Purnell (ISBN 978-0361044028)
- Daniel Defoe's Robinson Crusoe, retold by Jane Carruth (1982), Award (ISBN 978-0861630653)
- Kenneth Grahame (1982), The Wind in the Willows, Purnell (ISBN 978-0361055017)
  – (1983), Mr. Toad (Tales from The Wind in the Willows), Purnell (ISBN 978-0361056113)
  - (1983), Home Sweet Home (Tales from The Wind in the Willows), Purnell (ISBN 978-0361056106)
  – (1983), Toad's Adventures (Tales from The Wind in the Willows), Purnell (ISBN 978-0361056120)
  – (1983), The River Bank (Tales from The Wind in the Willows), Purnell (ISBN 978-0361056083)
  – (1983), The Open Road (Tales from The Wind in the Willows), Purnell (ISBN 978-0361056090)
  – (1983), The Further Adventures of Toad (Tales from The Wind in the Willows), Purnell (ISBN 978-0361056137)
- John Worsley (1984), foreword to A Roving Reporter: A Tribute to the Memory of Donald Charles Orbach 1914–1982
- Robert Louis Stevenson's Treasure Island, retold by Jane Carruth (1984), Award (ISBN 978-0861631315)
- Charles Dickens, ed. Jane Wilton-Smith (1985), A Christmas Carol, Gallery Books (ISBN 978-0831712983)
- Alan Stranks (1990), The Adventures of P.C. 49 (Eagles Classics), Hawk Books (ISBN 978-0948248177)
- Kenneth Grahame (1990), Mr. Toad (the Wind in the Willows Library), Award Publications Ltd (ISBN 978-0861634637)
- Barry O'Brien, Kaj Melendez, and Mirza Javed (1962), Ace London, Fleetway Publications; repub. (2011) Cuauhtemoc Publishing Ltd (ISBN 978-0957032101)

== Selected filmography ==
- The Captive Heart (1946)
- Albert R.N. (1953)
- Anglia Story Series: The Wind in the Willows (1969)
  – The Winter of Enchantment (1970)
  – A Christmas Carol (1970)
  – Treasure Island (1972)
  – Baldmoney, Sneezwort, Dodder and Cloudberry (The Little Grey Men) (1975)
  – The Whisper of Glocken (1976/ 1980)

== See also ==
- Treasure (magazine)
- Marlag und Milag Nord
