= Kenneth Norman Lilly =

British wildlife artist

Kenneth Norman Lilly (1929–1996) was a British wildlife artist who contributed many painted pages to educational magazines (Look and Learn, Treasure). He designed a set of stamps for Royal Mail in 1986; the set was named: "Nature Conservation: Species at Risk". The 17p stamp showed a Barn Owl, the 22p stamp showed a Pine Marten, the 31p showed a Wild Cat, the 34p showed a Natterjack Toad. At the time Ken Lilly lived in Colyton, Devon.
