= Booby trap (disambiguation) =

A booby trap is an antipersonnel device disguised as a harmless object.

Booby Trap may also refer to:

- "Booby Trap" (Star Trek: The Next Generation), an episode of Star Trek: The Next Generation
- Booby Trap (film), a 1957 British crime film
- Booby Trap (novella), a 1944 Nero Wolfe story by Rex Stout
- "Booby Trap", a 1996 single by godheadSilo
- Booby Traps, a 1944 Warner Bros. Private Snafu cartoon directed by Bob Clampett
- 10 Seconds to Murder or Booby Trap, a 1973 exploitation movie directed by Carl Monson
