= James McConnell =

James McConnell may refer to:

- James McConnell (engineer) (1815–1883), British engineer of the London and North Western Railway
- James McConnell (chess), (1829–1917), Louisiana lawyer who played chess with Morphy and other champions, see Sacrifice
- James V. McConnell (1925–1990), American biologist
- James McConnell (Medal of Honor) (1878–1918), Philippine–American War Medal of Honor recipient
- James E. McConnell (1903–1995), British book and magazine cover artist
- James Robert McConnell (1915–1999), Irish theoretical physicist and Roman Catholic priest
- James Rogers McConnell (1887–1917), World War I aviator
- James McConnell (footballer, fl. 1886–1890), English football goalkeeper
- James McConnell (footballer, born 2004), English football midfielder for Liverpool

== See also ==
- James McConnell Anderson (1907–1998), American artist
- Jim McConnell (born 1946), American politician
