= Anthony Raine Barker =

British artist

Anthony Raine (A.R.) Barker (4 September 1880 – 9 August 1963) was a British artist. He was educated at Framlingham College, Suffolk, and trained initially as an architect at the Royal Institute of British Architects (RIBA). In 1909, he won the RIBA John Soane medallion for design, and in January of the following year, he was awarded a certificate of honourable mention in the William Tite prize. He later became a painter in the traditional school of English watercolour as well as an engraver, lithographer, and etcher.

Barker exhibited over many years at the Royal Academy, and examples of his work are owned by the Victoria and Albert Museum, the British Museum, and the Walker Art Gallery in Liverpool. In the 1920s, he was an active member of the Senefelder Club. He published two children's books illustrated with his own wood-cuts, The Fairyland Express (1925) and Hidden Gold (1926).

On 26 February 1916, Barker married Martha Lydia Patricia Russell, commonly known as "Patricia", at St Paulinus church, Crayford, Kent. She was the youngest daughter of Thomas Russell, a photographer based in Chichester, West Sussex. Barker died on 9 August 1963, aged 82, at Queen Mary's Hospital, Sidcup, South East London. The funeral was held at the parish church of St George, Benenden, Kent, on 14 August 1963, at 12:30 pm, with interment taking place in the churchyard. He was survived by his wife, daughter, and son, Felix Barker, the British journalist and drama critic.
