= Ralph Hyde =

British art historian (1939–2015)

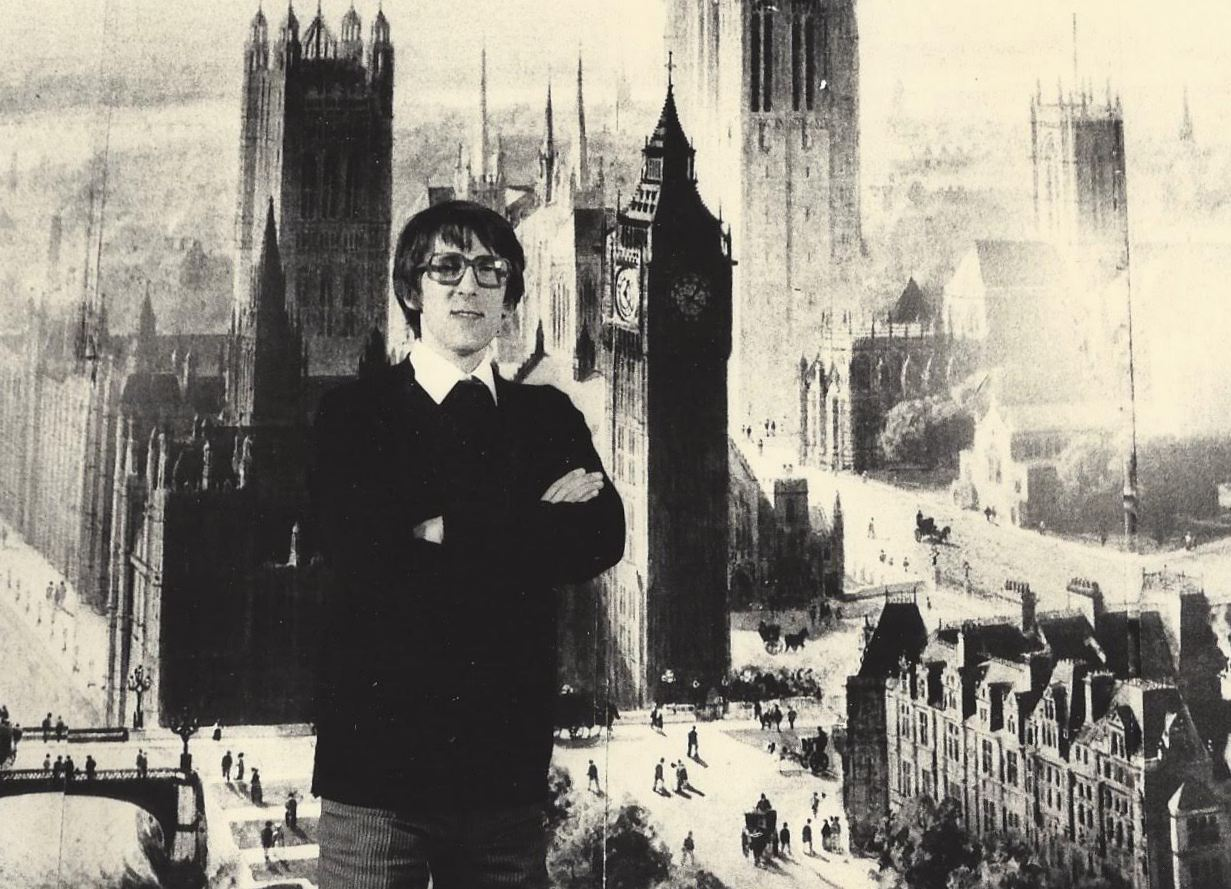
- Born: 25 March 1939; Uxbridge, West London, England
- Died: 5 June 2015 (aged 76)

Academic work
- Discipline: Panoramic painting

Ralph Hyde (25 March 1939 – 5 June 2015) was a curator of graphic arts at the Guildhall Library in London, a pre-eminent historian and writer on the subject of Panoramic painting. On his retirement he lived for a time in France but returned to London to continue as an active scholar in the field. In addition to having curated the Panoramania exhibition at the Barbican, he co-authored with Felix Barker the richly illustrated book London As It Might Have Been, which illustrates numerous planned, but never built, fanciful structures in London. He was a member of the International Panorama Council, and at the time of his death was compiling a Dictionary of Panoramists.
