= There Is Another Sun =

1951 British film by Lewis Gilbert

- DVD cover
- Directed by: Lewis Gilbert
- Written by: Guy Morgan
- Produced by: Ernest G. Roy
- Starring: Maxwell Reed; Laurence Harvey; Susan Shaw
- Cinematography: Wilkie Cooper; Dudley Lovell
- Edited by: Charles Hasse
- Music by: Wilfred Burns
- Distributed by: Butcher's Film Service (UK); Realart Pictures (US)
- Release dates: 12 June 1951; 17 May 1952 (US)
- Running time: 89 minutes
- Country: United Kingdom
- Language: English

There Is Another Sun (U.S. title: Wall of Death) is a 1951 British drama film directed by Lewis Gilbert and starring Maxwell Reed, Laurence Harvey and Susan Shaw. It was written by Guy Morgan and produced by Ernest G. Roy.

== Cast ==
- Maxwell Reed as Eddie 'Racer' Peskett
- Laurence Harvey as Mag Maguire
- Susan Shaw as Lillian
- Leslie Dwyer as Mick Foley
- Meredith Edwards as Detective Sergeant Bratcher
- Hermione Baddeley as Gypsy Sarah, fortune-teller
- Robert Adair as Sarno
- Leslie Bradley as racetrack manager
- Eric Pohlmann as Markie, club owner
- Nosher Powell as Teddy Green, champ boxer
- Earl Cameron as Ginger Jones, carnival boxer
- Dennis Vance as Len Tyldesley
- Laurence Naismith as Riley, Green's trainer
- Charles Farrell as Mr. Simmons, fight promoter
- Wilfred Burns as pianist
- Harry Fowler as first novice biker
- Jennifer Jayne as Dora, Lil's friend at Markie's
- Arthur Mullard as Harry, boxing booth contestant
- Hal Osmond as Mannock
- J.H. Messham as 1st Wall of Death rider
- Jim Kynaston as 2nd Wall of Death rider
- Tom Messham as 3rd Wall of Death rider

== Production ==
The film was shot at Walton Studios, with sets designed by the art director George Provis.

== Critical reception ==
The Monthly Film Bulletin wrote: "The atmosphere of the fairground and the speedway is quite well caught, but the picture is otherwise mediocre. Most of the characters are weak-willed or unpleasant, the ending is trite and the playing, with the exception of Hermione Baddeley's effective appearance as a fortune teller, without distinction."

The Radio Times Guide to Films gave the film 3/5 stars, writing: "There's nothing new in the story and the performances of Maxwell Reed and Laurence Harvey have little to commend them. But director Lewis Gilbert's thoroughly nasty atmosphere conjured up in a place dedicated to enjoyment makes this unusually effective movie worth watching."

In British Sound Films: The Studio Years 1928–1959 David Quinlan rated the film as "mediocre", writing: "Gloomy, depressing number; long too."

Leslie Halliwell said: "Glum quickie which was oddly popular."
