= Harry Fowler =

English actor (1926–2012)

Harry Fowler MBE
- Born: Henry James Fowler; 10 December 1926; Lambeth, London, England
- Died: 4 January 2012 (aged 85)
- Occupation: Actor
- Years active: 1942–2004
- Spouses: Joan Dowling (m. 1951; died 1954); Catherine Palmer (m. 1960)

Henry James Fowler (10 December 1926 – 4 January 2012) was an English character actor in film and television. Over a career lasting more than six decades, he made nearly 200 appearances on screen.

== Personal life ==
Fowler was born in Lambeth, south London, on 10 December 1926. As a "near illiterate newspaper boy" making eight shillings a week, he told film historian Brian McFarlane, he was invited on to radio to speak about his life in wartime London.

In 1951, Fowler married actress Joan Dowling, who died by suicide in 1954. In 1960, he married Catherine Palmer.

Fowler died on 4 January 2012. He was survived by his wife and had no children.

== Career ==
Fowler's radio interview about his experiences in wartime London led to an invitation to a screen test at Elstree Studios and a film debut as Ern in the 1942 film Those Kids from Town, a propaganda piece about wartime evacuee children from London (co-starring alongside fellow debutant George Cole). His fee was 2 guineas (42 shillings) a day - a fortune compared to the 8 shillings a week he had been earning as a newspaper boy up to his audition.

His early juvenile roles included Hue and Cry (1947), usually considered the first of the Ealing comedies. Fowler later married Joan Dowling, one of his co-stars in the Ealing film. Dowling died by suicide in 1954, aged 26.

During the Second World War, he served as an aircraftman in the Royal Air Force and played a cheerful cockney character with the same job in the films Angels One Five (1952), and Conflict of Wings (1954), a portrayal he used in other contexts, often with a humorous slant, especially during his year in The Army Game (1959–60) TV series.

He played Harry Danvers in the clerical comedy Our Man at St. Mark's (1965–66) opposite Donald Sinden and made several appearances on children's television during the 1970s, reading on Jackanory and hosting the series Get This and Going a Bundle with Kenny Lynch. Fowler also made several appearances in the consumer affairs sections of the Eamonn Andrews Show on ABC TV in the late 1960s. He is also noted for having narrated Bob Godfrey Films' Great: Isambard Kingdom Brunel (1975), the first British cartoon to win an Academy Award. His familiar voice was regularly used for TV commercials.

In 1975, Fowler took the part of Eric Lee Fung, described as "a Chinese cockney spiv", in The Melting Pot, a sitcom written by Spike Milligan and Neil Shand. The series was cancelled by the BBC after the first episode had been broadcast.

He was awarded an MBE in 1970, as part of Harold Wilson's Resignation Honours.

In his book British Film Character Actors (1982), Terence Pettigrew wrote that Fowler "was as English as suet pudding ... his characters were neither honest nor irretrievably delinquent, merely wise in the ways of the streets, surviving through a combination of wit and stealth. He had a certain arrogance, but there was an appealing vulnerability, too."

== Selected filmography ==
- Those Kids from Town (1942) – Ern
- Salute John Citizen (1942) – Office Boy (uncredited)
- Went the Day Well? (1942) – Young George
- Get Cracking (1943) – (uncredited)
- The Demi-Paradise (1943) – Small Boy (An Evacuee) (uncredited)
- Bell-Bottom George (1944) – Boy on Bicycle (uncredited)
- Champagne Charlie (1944) – 'Orace
- Give Us the Moon (1944) – Bellboy (uncredited)
- Don't Take It to Heart (1944) – Telegraph Boy
- Painted Boats (1945) – His Brother Alf
- Hue and Cry (1947) – Joe Kirby
- Trouble in the Air (1948) – (uncredited)
- A Piece of Cake (1948) – Head Spiv
- For Them That Trespass (1949) – Dave, Rosie's friend
- Now Barabbas (1949) – Smith
- Landfall (1949) – RAF Corporal Orderly (uncredited)
- Dance Hall (1950) – Amorous Youth (uncredited)
- Once a Sinner (1950) – Bill James
- Trio (1950) – Undetermined Secondary Role (uncredited)
- She Shall Have Murder (1950) – Albert Oates
- The Dark Man (1951) – 1st Reporter
- Mister Drake's Duck (1951) – Corporal
- Scarlet Thread (1951) – Sam
- There Is Another Sun (1951) – Young Rider
- Madame Louise (1951) – Trout's Clerk
- High Treason (1951) – Street Photographer (uncredited)
- The Promise (1952)
- The Last Page (1952) – Joe
- 13 East Street (1952) – (uncredited)
- I Believe in You (1952) – Hooker
- Angels One Five (1952) – Airman
- The Pickwick Papers (1952) – Sam Weller
- Top of the Form (1953) – Albert
- A Day to Remember (1953) – Stan Harvey
- Don't Blame the Stork (1954) – Harry Fenn
- Conflict of Wings (1954) – Leading Aircraftman 'Buster'
- Up to His Neck (1954) – Smudge
- Stock Car (1955) – Monty Albright
- The Blue Peter (1955) – Charlie Barton
- Fire Maidens from Outer Space (1956) – Sydney Stanhope
- Behind the Headlines (1956) – Alfie
- Home and Away (1956) – Syd Jarvis
- Town on Trial (1957) – Leslie (Bandleader)
- West of Suez (1957) – Tommy
- Booby Trap (1957) – Sammy
- Lucky Jim (1957) – Cab Driver (uncredited)
- The Birthday Present (1957) – Charlie
- The Supreme Secret (1958) – Bluey
- Soapbox Derby (1958) – Barrow Boy
- The Diplomatic Corpse (1958) – Knocker Parsons
- I Was Monty's Double (1958) – Civilian (End Scene)
- Idol on Parade (1959) – Ron
- The Heart of a Man (1959) – Razor
- The Dawn Killer (1959) – Bert Iron
- Don't Panic Chaps! (1959) – Ackroyd
- Crooks Anonymous (1962) – Woods
- Flight from Singapore (1962) – Sgt. Brooks
- The Longest Day (1962) – British Paratrooper (uncredited)
- Lawrence of Arabia (1962) – William Potter (uncredited)
- Tomorrow at Ten (1962) – Smiley
- Ladies Who Do (1963) – Drill Operator
- Seventy Deadly Pills (1964) – Covent Garden porter
- Father Came Too! (1964)
- Clash by Night (1964) – Doug Roberts
- The Nanny (1965) – Milkman
- Life at the Top (1965) – Magic Beans Man
- Doctor in Clover (1966) – Grafton
- Secrets of a Windmill Girl (1966) – Harry
- Start the Revolution Without Me (1970) – Marcel
- Crossed Swords (1977) – Nipper
- High Rise Donkey (1980) – Crook
- Sir Henry at Rawlinson End (1980) – Buller Bullethead
- George and Mildred (1980) – Fisher
- Fanny Hill (1983) – Beggar (uncredited)
- Body Contact (1987) – Herbert
- Chicago Joe and the Showgirl (1990) – Morry

== Selected TV appearances ==
- Dial 999 (TV series) (1959) ("Barge Burglars", episode) – Sandy Gordon
- The Army Game (1959–1960) – Cpl. 'Flogger' Hoskins
- Gideons Way (1964)
- Dixon of Dock Green (1963–1970) – Duncan / Billy Reynolds / Alf Stubbings / Handbag Wilson
- Z-Cars (1963–1972) – Billy Carrick / Tony / Toff
- Jackanory (1969–1971) – Storyteller
- Crown Court (1973) – George Curl
- Going A Bundle (1976) – himself
- Minder (1982) – Monty Wiseman
- In Sickness and in Health (1985–1992) – Harry / milkman
- Casualty (1986–1992) – George / Terry
- Super Gran (1987) – Sid Scoundrel
- Doctor Who: Remembrance of the Daleks (1988) – Harry
- The Bill (1989–1992) – Alfred Sheldon / Pat Fitzgerald
- The Impressionable Jon Culshaw (2004) – customer (final appearance)
