= Josef Bryks =

Czechoslovak pilot (1916–1957)

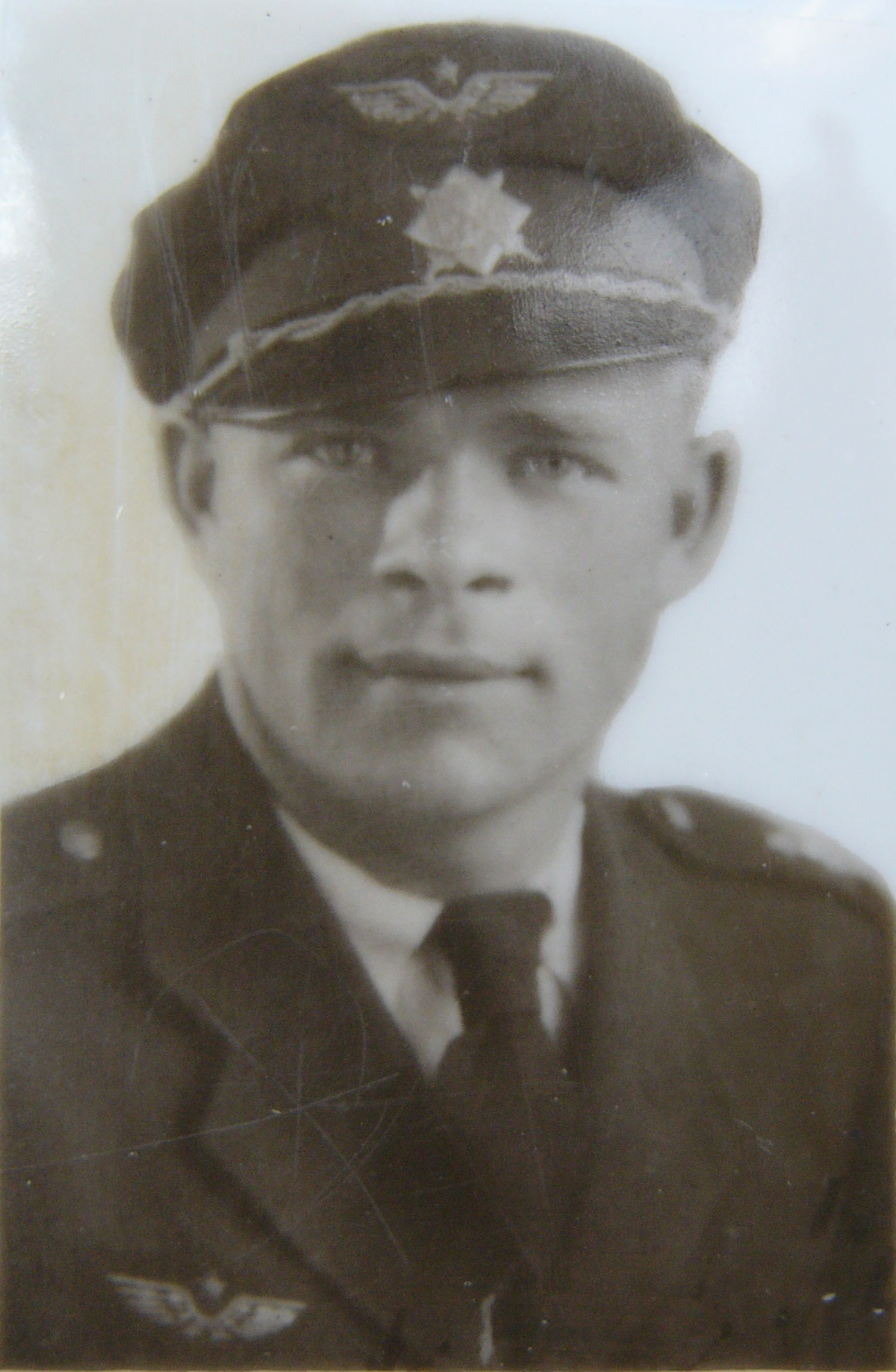
- Josef Bryks in Czechoslovak Air Force uniform
- Born: 18 March 1916; Lašťany, Moravia
- Died: 11 August 1957 (aged 41); Ostrov nad Ohří, Czechoslovakia
- Burial place: Motol, Prague
- Relatives: 1st wife: Marie, née Černá (1939–, divorced) 2nd wife: Gertrude, née Dellar (1945–) Daughter: Sonia Bryksová
- Military career
- Allegiance: Czechoslovakia; United Kingdom; Czechoslovakia
- Branch: Czechoslovak Army Czechoslovak Air Force Royal Air Force
- Service years: 1935–1948
- Rank: Major
- Units: 5th Sqn, 2nd Aviation Regt 33rd Fighter Squadron; No. 310 Squadron RAF; Headquarters Ferry Pool; No. 6 Maintenance Unit No. 242 Squadron RAF
- Conflicts: World War II; Circus offensive; Warsaw Ghetto Uprising
- Awards: Member of Order of the British Empire; Order of the White Lion (posthumous) Czechoslovak War Cross 1939–1945 × 2 Československá medaile Za chrabrost před nepřítelem × 2 Československá medaile za zásluhy, 1. stupně Pamětní medaile čs. zahraniční armády

Josef Bryks, MBE, (Czech pronunciation: [ˈjozɛv brɪks]; 18 March 1916– 11 August 1957) was a Czechoslovak cavalryman, fighter pilot, prisoner of war and political prisoner.

In 1940 he escaped the German occupation of Czechoslovakia and joined the Royal Air Force Volunteer Reserve. In 1941 he was shot down over German-occupied France.

Bryks was a prisoner of war for four years, in which time he escaped and was recaptured three times. After his third escape he served in the Polish Home Army in Warsaw, where he helped to get supplies to Jewish resistance fighters in the Warsaw Ghetto Uprising.

After his third recapture Bryks was moved to Stalag Luft III where he helped in the Great Escape, and then to Oflag IV-C in Colditz Castle, where he remained until it was liberated by the US Army in 1945.

In 1945 Bryks returned to Czechoslovakia and his Czechoslovak Air Force career. However, after the 1948 Czechoslovak coup d'état the Communists purged Bryks and many other officers who had served in Free Czechoslovak units under French or UK command.

In 1949 the Communists sentenced Bryks to 10 years in prison and stripped him of his rank and medals. In 1950 20 years' hard labour and a heavy fine were added to his original sentence. In 1952 he was moved to a prison where he was forced to work in a uranium mine. Bryks died of a heart attack in a prison hospital in 1957.

Bryks was posthumously rehabilitated after the 1989 Velvet Revolution ended the Communist dictatorship.

== Early life ==
Josef Bryks was born in 1916 in Lašťany, a village about 12 kilometres (7 miles) northeast of Olomouc in Moravia. His parents František and Anna (née Nesvetrová) were farmers. Bryks was the seventh of eight children, but only four survived to adulthood. Bryks studied at the Commercial Academy in Olomouc and passed his Matura (final exam of secondary education) in June 1935.

In October 1935, Bryks joined the Czechoslovak Army. He started his service in a cavalry regiment in Košice. At the same time, he studied at a school for cavalry officers in Pardubice until July 1936. From October 1936 to August 1937, he studied at the Military Academy in Hranice, where he transferred from the cavalry to the air force. He was promoted to lieutenant and specialized as an aerial observer. After his training, he was posted to the 5th Observation Squadron of the 2nd "Dr Edvard Beneš" Aviation Regiment, stationed in Prague. From October 1937, he trained as a pilot in Prostějov. On 30 September 1938, he graduated and was posted to the 33rd Fighter Squadron at Olomouc, where he flew Avia B-534 fighter aircraft.

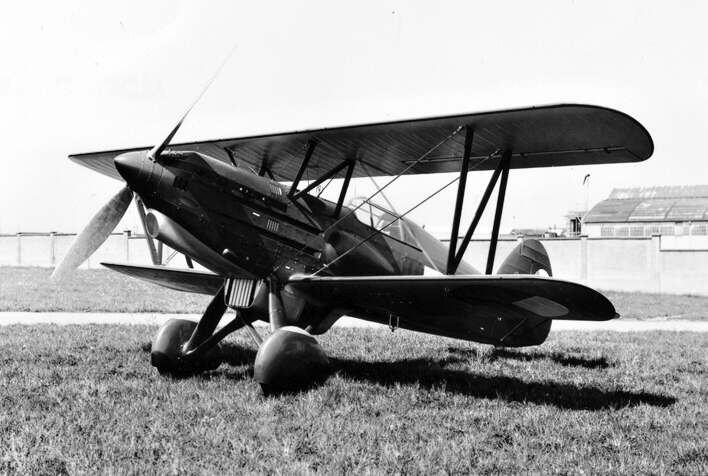
Bryks flew an Avia B-534 fighter with the 33rd Fighter Squadron

On the day that Bryks qualified as a fighter pilot, the United Kingdom and France signed the Munich Agreement that forced Czechoslovakia to cede the Sudetenland to Nazi Germany. On 15 March 1939, Germany occupied the remainder of Bohemia and Moravia, and the resulting Protectorate of Bohemia and Moravia was forced to dissolve its army and air force.

In the meantime, Bryks' girlfriend, Marie Černá, became pregnant. On 18 April 1939, Bryks and Černá got married and her father, a butcher, gave Bryks a job as his assistant. The baby, a daughter, died two days after being born. Until the German invasion of Poland, Bryks secretly helped Czechoslovak pilots to escape to Poland. In December 1939, Bryks got a job as a civil servant at the Ministry of the Interior, but after three days he resigned.

== Second World War ==
=== Escape from the Reich Protectorate ===
On 20 January 1940, Bryks escaped from Bohemia and Moravia. He passed illegally through Slovakia and into Hungary. He was arrested in Hungary on 26 January and held in jail in Budapest until 4 April, when he was extradited to Slovakia. He escaped, traveled through Hungary again, reached Yugoslavia, and on 17 April 1940 he reported to the French Consulate in Belgrade.

From there, Bryks travelled through Greece and Turkey to French-ruled Syria, where he embarked on a ship to France. The ship reached France on 10 May, the day Germany launched its invasion of France, the Netherlands and Belgium. Bryks and other Czechoslovak Air Force personnel were sent to Agde on the coast of Languedoc. The Armée de l'air was fully occupied resisting the German advance and repeatedly having to retreat to different airfields. It had neither the instructors, equipment nor time to retrain the Czechoslovaks to operate French aircraft. On 22 June, France surrendered, and on 27 June, Bryks was evacuated by ship.

=== Royal Air Force (1940–1941) ===
Bryks reached Britain, where he was commissioned into the RAF Volunteer Reserve as a pilot officer. He was retrained at RAF Cosford in Shropshire, where he learnt to fly the Hawker Hurricane. On 4 August he was posted to the recently formed No. 310 Squadron RAF, which was the RAF's first squadron formed of exiled Czechoslovak personnel. However, on 17 August he was posted for further fighter training with No. 6 Operational Training Unit at RAF Sutton Bridge in Lincolnshire.

Then on 1 October Bryks was posted to No. 12 Operational Training Unit at RAF Benson in Oxfordshire, which taught light bomber aircrew. On 11 November, he was posted to the Headquarters Ferry Pool at RAF Kemble in Gloucestershire, which worked with the non-combatant Air Transport Auxiliary. On 1 January 1941, he was transferred to No. 6 Maintenance Unit at RAF Brize Norton in Oxfordshire as a test pilot.

==== Hurricane pilot with 242 Squadron ====
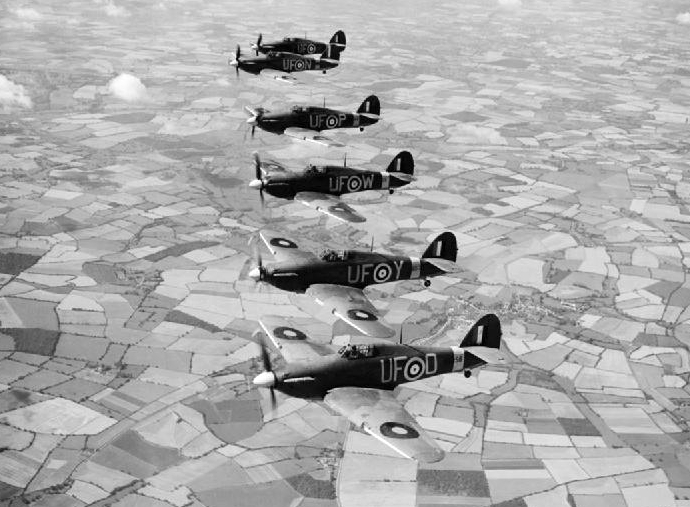
Hurricane Mk IIb fighters in formation over Essex in 1941

On 23 April 1941, Bryks was at last posted to a combat squadron. He spoke good English thanks to his secondary school studies in Olomouc. He was posted not to one of the RAF's Czechoslovak squadrons but to No. 242 Squadron RAF, which was commanded by Douglas Bader and had a large Canadian contingent. At the time, it flew Hurricane Mk IIb aircraft as night fighters, so Bryks was trained in night flying and navigation.

When Bryks joined 242 Squadron, it was based at RAF Stapleford Tawney in Essex. While he was with the squadron it was transferred to RAF North Weald, also in Essex. Bryks became friends with a WAAF, Gertrude "Trudie" Dellar, who was the widow of an RAF pilot.

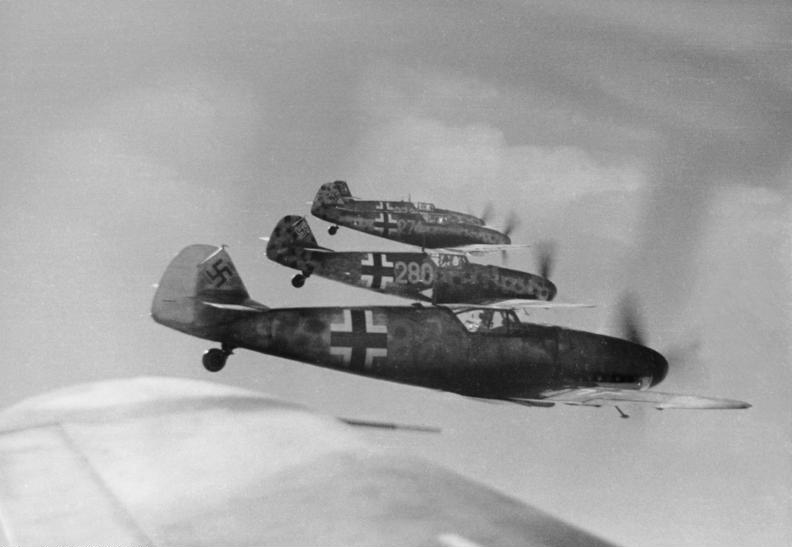
A formation of Messerschmitt Bf 109 fighters

242 Squadron's rôle was changed to Circus offensives over German-occupied Europe, escorting RAF bombers with the purpose of enticing Luftwaffe fighter attacks. On 17 June 1941, the squadron took part in Circus 14. This was a late afternoon attack on Lille in northern France by 23 Bristol Blenheim bombers of 18, 105 and 110 Squadrons, escorted by 19 Hurricanes and Supermarine Spitfires. A large force of Messerschmitt Bf 109 fighters from I, II and III/Jagdgeschwader 26, led by flying ace Lieutenant Colonel Adolf Galland, plus Bf 109s from III/Jagdgeschwader 2, attacked the formation, shooting down 13 of the 40 RAF aircraft.

The RAF raiders managed to shoot down only three Bf 109s. One of these was downed by Bryks, but then three Bf 109s attacked his Hurricane, hitting its fuel tank and setting it afire. Bryks suffered burns to his face and ankle, and his cockpit filled with smoke. He bailed out at an altitude of 10,000 feet (3,000 m), about 15 kilometres (9 miles) west of Saint-Omer-en-Chaussée, losing one of his flying boots as he did so.

=== Prisoner of war (1941–1945) ===
Bryks landed safely and started to bury his parachute. Frenchmen who had seen him descend gave him a civilian coat to hide his RAF uniform and told him to go to a safe house in a nearby hamlet. Bryks hid in a barn until nightfall, then went to the hamlet, where he asked at a house for a doctor to treat his burns. The occupants betrayed him by calling the Germans, but when Bryks heard their motorised patrol coming, he fled the house and hid in a garden. The patrol caught him, beat him up and took him to St Omer.

The Protectorate of Bohemia and Moravia was subject to Nazi Germany, whose authorities deemed anyone from the protectorate who served in Allied forces to be a traitor. He could therefore be executed, and his family would suffer reprisals. Therefore, Bryks assumed the identity of "Joseph Ricks", born in 1918 in Cirencester, a Gloucestershire market town about 8 kilometres (5 miles) from where he had been spent two months at RAF Kemble.

When he was shot down, Bryks was wearing the Mae West lifejacket of a Polish colleague from 242 Squadron, F/O Henry Skalsky. Therefore, the Germans who questioned him at St Omer suspected he was Polish, and sent him to Dulag Luft at Oberursel in Hesse for interrogation by a Polish-speaking German officer. There he was accused of shooting a Luftwaffe fighter pilot who was parachuting from his Bf 109 in the air battle near St Omer on 17 June. For this, he was threatened with being court-martialled in Berlin. After the war, no such shooting was found in German records for that day. The accusation seems to have been a false one to put pressure on Bryks.

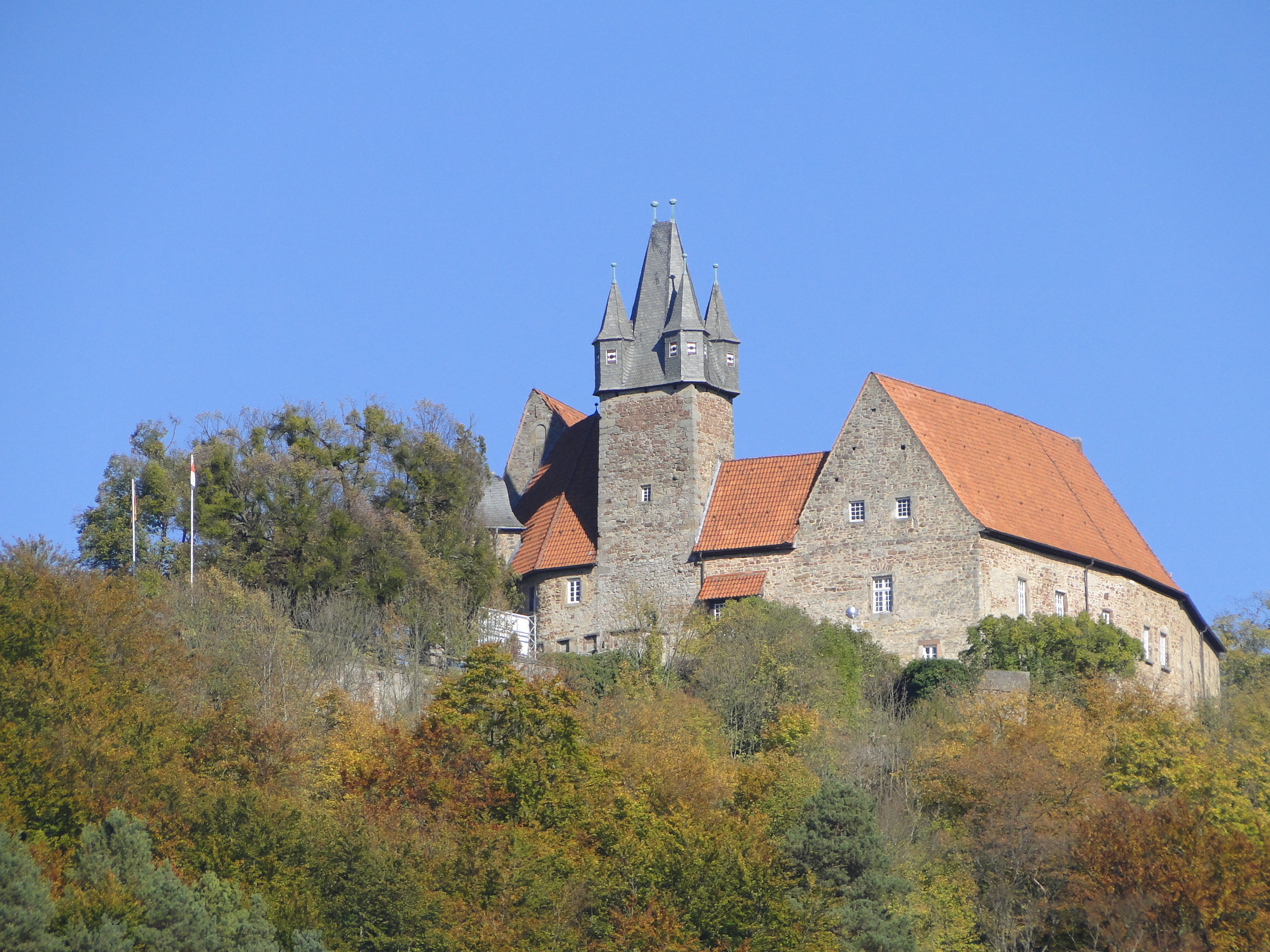
Spangenberg castle in Hesse, where Bryks was held in Oflag IX-A/H from June to October 1941

On 22 June, Bryks was transferred from Dulag Luft to Oflag IX-A/H in Spangenberg castle in Hesse-Nassau. Here he advised the Senior British Officer (SBO), Major General Victor Fortune, of his true identity. Fortune knew the threat to Czechoslovak pilots in captivity and supported Bryks' assumed identity. And via the Red Cross, Bryks, posing as "Joseph Ricks", started writing to Gertrude Dellar.

==== Escape from Oflag VI-B ====
On 8 October 1941, Bryks was transferred to Oflag VI-B at Dössel in Westphalia. There again he advised the SBO of his true identity. The PoWs' Escape Committee authorised a team of four men, including Bryks, to dig a 10-metre (33 ft) escape tunnel through frozen clay. On the night of 19/20 April 1942, three Poles and three Czechoslovaks escaped through the tunnel in pairs. Bryks was one of them, paired with a fellow Czechoslovak, Flight Lieutenant Otakar Černý.

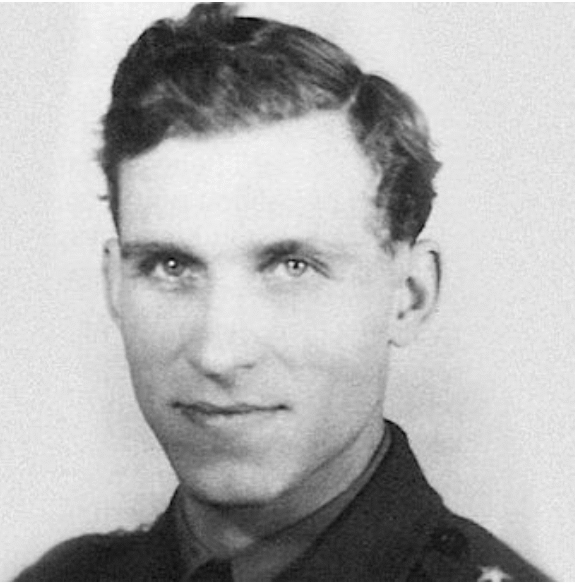
Otakar Černý in 1946

Bryks and Černý aimed to reach Switzerland. Around midnight on 28 April, Černý was recaptured near Marburg in Hesse-Nassau. Near Giessen in Hesse-Darmstadt, Bryks stole a bicycle. He passed Offenbach am Main. A German guard shot at him as he crossed a bridge near Stuttgart in Württemberg. After this, short of food and water, Bryks fell ill with dysentery. He hid in a wood near Eberbach in Baden. There, on 31 April, a group of Hitler Youth captured him.

Bryks had been on the run for 11 days and had travelled 300 kilometres (190 miles) south from Dössel before being caught. On 5 May 1942, he was taken to Darmstadt and held by the Gestapo. He was returned to Oflag VI-B at Dössel, where he was treated in the camp's infirmary from 8 May to 10 June.

==== Escape from Oflag VI-A ====
By 20 July 1942, Bryks had been transferred to Oflag VI-A near Soest in Westphalia. He was held in solitary confinement from 12 August, but fellow prisoners smuggled razor blades to him hidden inside bread. With these, he cut a hole in the wooden floor of his cell and tunnelled to the German quarters. On 17 August he escaped through the tunnel, wearing only pyjamas, a sweater and a blanket.

Again Bryks headed south. About 10 kilometres (6 miles) south of Frankfurt, he found a Luftwaffe airfield where Bf 109 night fighters were based. He planned to steal one and fly to Britain, until a patrol with guard dogs approached. He fled and waded along a river to put the dogs off the scent. He reached Mannheim in Baden, where on the night of 8 September he was captured by German air defence troops, who handed him to the local Gestapo. He had been on the run for 22 days and once again had travelled 300 kilometres (190 miles) south before being caught.

Bryks was returned to Oflag VI-B, but soon afterwards he and other RAF PoWs were transferred to Oflag XXI-B at Szubin in German-occupied Poland. There he told the SBO, Wing Commander Harry Day, of his true identity.

==== Escape from Oflag XXI-B ====
On 4 March 1943, Polish workers in the camp helped Bryks and a British officer, Squadron Leader Morris, to escape. The pair hid in a sewage tank that was mounted on a cart to empty the camp's latrines, wearing masks to try to protect them from the sewage. Members of the secret Armia Krajowa ("Home Army" or AK) hid them in a farmhouse. There they met Flight Lieutenant Černý, who had escaped via a tunnel the night before. Their plan was to travel via Warsaw to Danzig, and there board a ship to neutral Sweden.

Morris fell ill, but Bryks and Černý set off on foot. In three weeks, they covered the 280 kilometres (170 miles) to Warsaw, where on 6 April they reported to an address that the AK had given them. Bryks assumed a Polish identity, calling himself "Josef Brdnisz". He and Černý spent four weeks in Warsaw disguised as a pair of stove fitters and chimney sweeps. They drove a horse and cart around Warsaw, supplying arms to resistance groups and bringing in food from the countryside.

On 19 April, Jewish resistance groups launched the Warsaw Ghetto Uprising. Bryks and Černý helped to smuggle weapons and food to the rebels. The Germans crushed the ghetto uprising on 16 May.

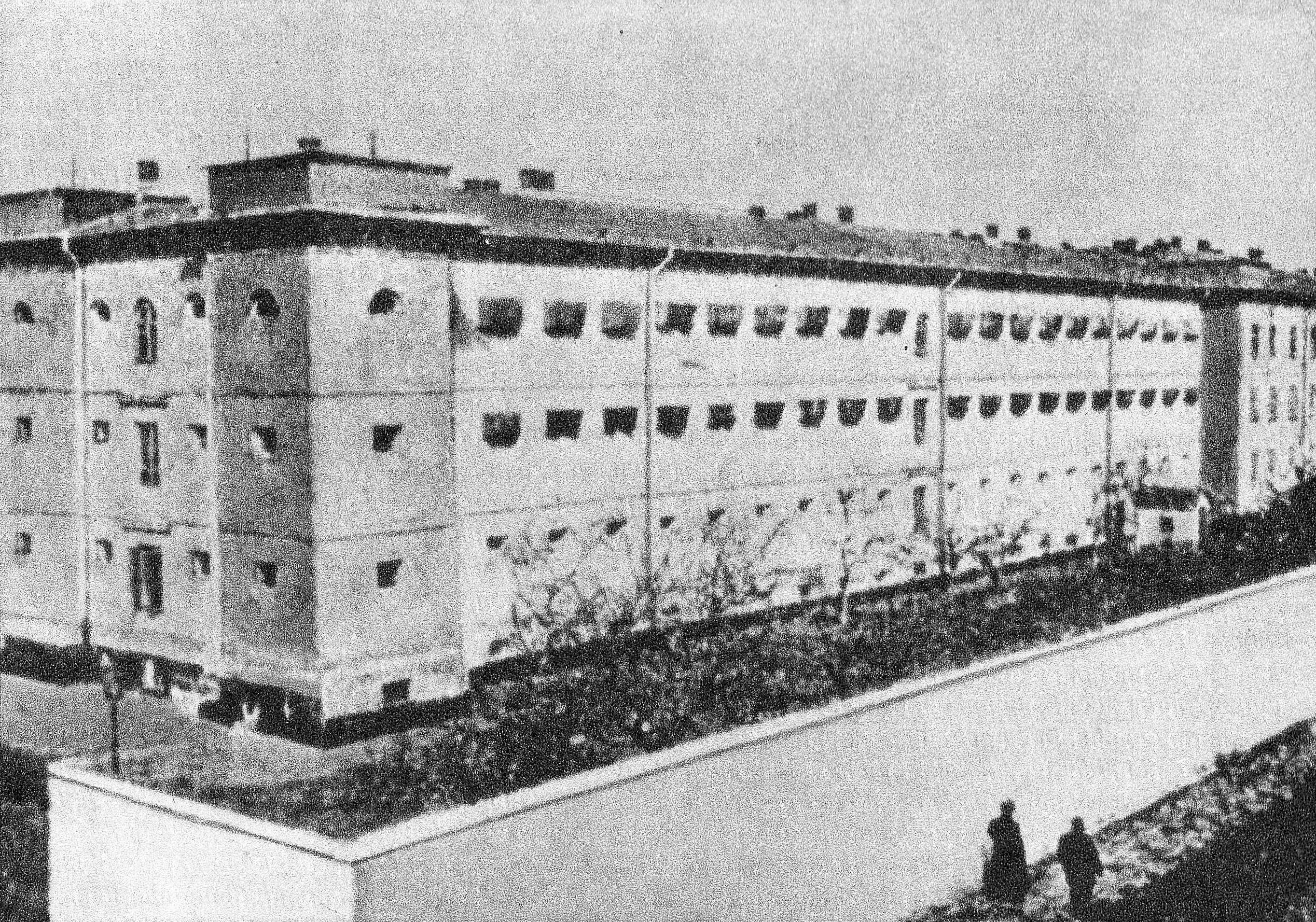
Pawiak prison in Warsaw, where Bryks and Černý were tortured for two months

A fortnight later, Bryks and Černý were lodging with a Polish widow, Mrs Błaszkiewiczowá, who had two young children and lived in a village several kilometres outside Warsaw. A collaborator told the German authorities, so on 2 June 1943 the Gestapo surrounded Mrs Błaszkiewiczowá's house and arrested everyone inside. They took Bryks, Černý and Mrs Błaszkiewiczowá to Pawiak prison, and hanged Mrs Błaszkiewiczowá for helping enemy pilots.

Bryks and Černý were interrogated, beaten and threatened with execution. On 5 June, a Scharführer called Grunnem kicked Bryks in the stomach, beat him about the head and left him unconscious. The Gestapo held him for 63 days. He suffered ruptured intestines and a punctured eardrum. Bryks was sentenced to death for helping the AK, but the sentence was commuted.

Bryks was then sent to Stalag Luft III, near Sagan in Lower Silesia. The camp's SBO, Group Captain Herbert Massey, sent a medical report to the UK authorities. On 10 October 1943, Bryks was transferred to the British military hospital at Stalag VIII-B in Upper Silesia. He underwent surgery on 7 November and was returned to Stalag Luft III on 23 December.

==== Stalag Luft III and the Great Escape ====
Months before Bryks was first sent to Stalag Luft III, preparations had been started for a mass escape of 200 PoWs, now commemorated as the Great Escape. Bryks joined in the preparations, which included completing a long tunnel code named "Harry". On the night of 23/24 March 1944, "Harry" was completed, and PoWs started leaving through it in pairs. Bryks was one of the men listed to escape, but before his turn came, the guards discovered the tunnel exit just outside the perimeter fence.

Only three days later, on 27 March, Bryks and a Royal Australian Air Force officer, Group Captain Douglas Wilson, tried to escape. Guards saw them and opened fire, so the pair surrendered and were put in solitary confinement.

==== Unmasked and interrogated ====
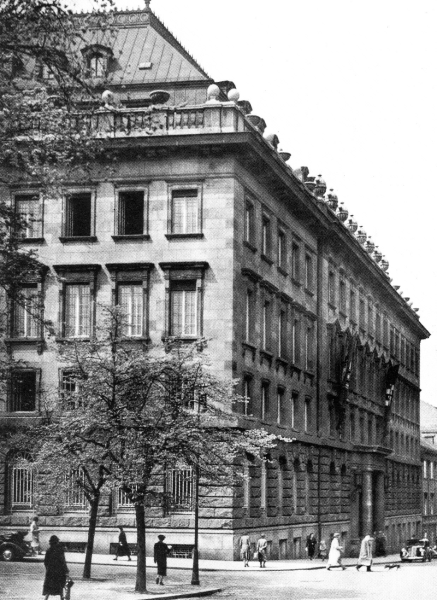
Petschek Palace in Prague, the Gestapo headquarters where Bryks was held and interrogated

In July 1944, the RAF promoted Bryks to flight lieutenant. Unfortunately the official letter sent from the UK via the Red Cross to tell Bryks of his promotion revealed his real name and nationality.

The Gestapo interrogated Bryks, told him his family in Bohemia and Moravia had been arrested and that he would be executed for treason. On 1 September 1944, he was brought to Gestapo headquarters in Petschek Palace in Prague. In due course, he was also held at Pankrác Prison and Loreta military prison. Twenty-three other Czechoslovak members of the RAFVR were also being held in these prisons. They were repeatedly interrogated and told that under German military law they were traitors and would be executed.

Through the Red Cross, the British Government was told that Germany was threatening to execute the Czechoslovak airmen. The United Kingdom replied through the same channel. As the Czechoslovak airmen were UK armed forces personnel, the UK demanded that Germany afford them the same rights and protections as any other PoWs from the UK. Winston Churchill threatened that if Germany executed any of them, the Allies would execute 10 Luftwaffe airmen for each Czechoslovak killed.

Germany did not revoke the threat of execution, but the Gestapo did return the Czechoslovaks to PoW camps. On 22 September 1944, Bryks was sent to Stalag Luft I near Barth in Western Pomerania.

==== Oflag IV-C, Colditz Castle and liberation ====
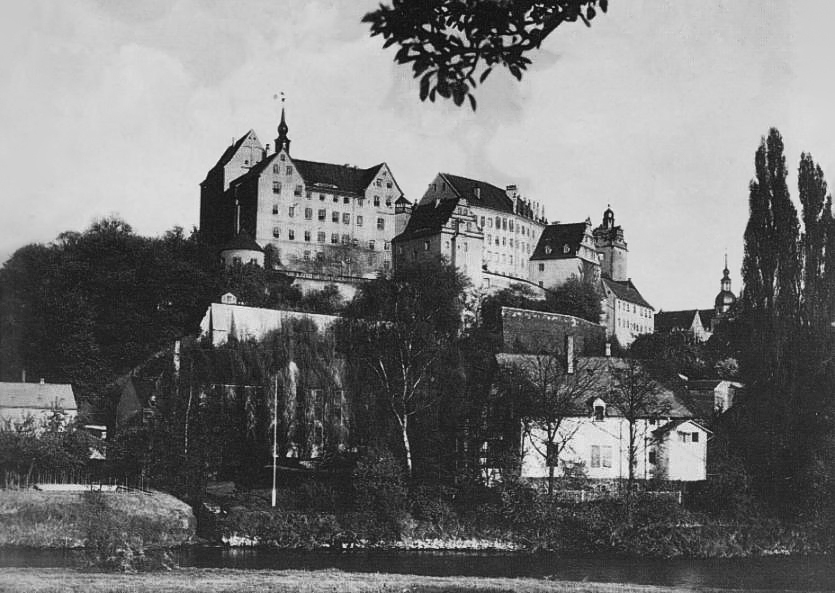
In his last six months as a PoW Bryks was held at Oflag IV-C in Colditz Castle in Saxony.

Because of his injuries from Gestapo interrogations, Bryks appeared before an international medical board on 6 November. The board deemed that he should be repatriated to the UK on medical grounds, but the German authorities refused because he was still accused of treason.

The next day, he was moved to Oflag IV-C at Colditz Castle in Saxony. This was a high-security prison for PoWs who had repeatedly escaped from other camps. There he remained until the United States Army liberated the camp on 16 April 1945.

Bryks returned to RAF Cosford in England to recover from his captivity and Gestapo torture. He learnt that his wife Marie in Czechoslovakia had divorced him in his absence, had remarried, and in April 1945 had committed suicide. After Germany surrendered in May 1945, Bryks went to see Gertrude Dellar and proposed to her. They were married on 18 June.

In August 1945, Bryks underwent further surgery for injuries from his Gestapo interrogation. In June 1946, he had surgery to remove a piece of shrapnel that had been embedded in the floor of his mouth when he was shot down in June 1941.

== In Czechoslovakia from 1945 ==
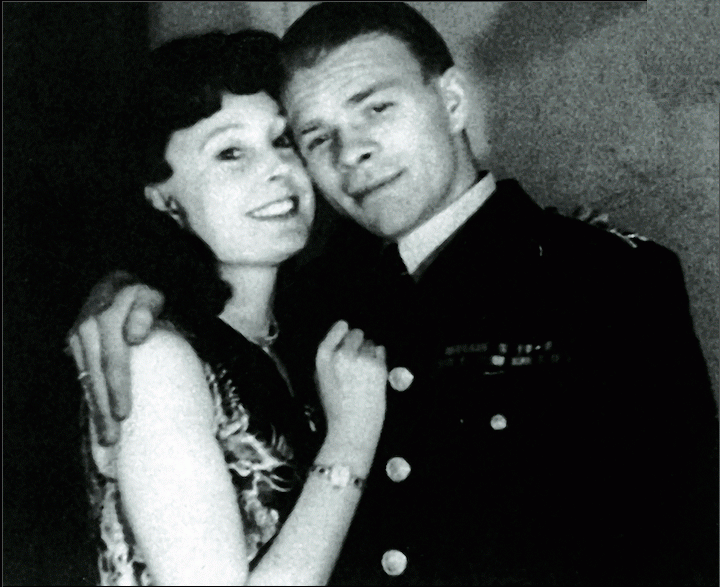
Trudie and Josef Bryks in Olomouc in 1947

On 6 October 1945, Bryks returned to Czechoslovakia with his second wife Gertrude. He resumed his Czechoslovak Air Force career, but his injuries, and particularly his hearing loss, prevented him from serving as a pilot. He was posted to the Military Aviation Academy at Olomouc, where he taught English and the theory of flight. He was promoted to captain in September 1945, staff captain in December 1945 and major in May 1946. Also in 1946, Gertrude bore Bryks a daughter, Sonia.

In April 1946, Ealing Studios released Basil Dearden's war film The Captive Heart. In it, Michael Redgrave played a Czechoslovak officer based on Bryks, Rachel Kempson played a young widow based on Gertrude Dellar, and Basil Radford the PoW camp's Senior British Officer (SBO) who protects the Czechoslovak officer.

=== Persecution ===
Bryks' air force career continued while a democratic coalition ruled the Third Czechoslovak Republic. But in February 1948, the Communist Party of Czechoslovakia (KSČ) seized power in a coup d'état. Bryks was deemed "politically unreliable" and on 9 March was placed on enforced leave and transferred to the military reserve force. His political opinions resulted in his superior officer, Colonel Václav Fuksa, writing that Bryks was "untrustworthy for his political irresponsibility and for the lack of understanding of the ideology of People's Democracy".

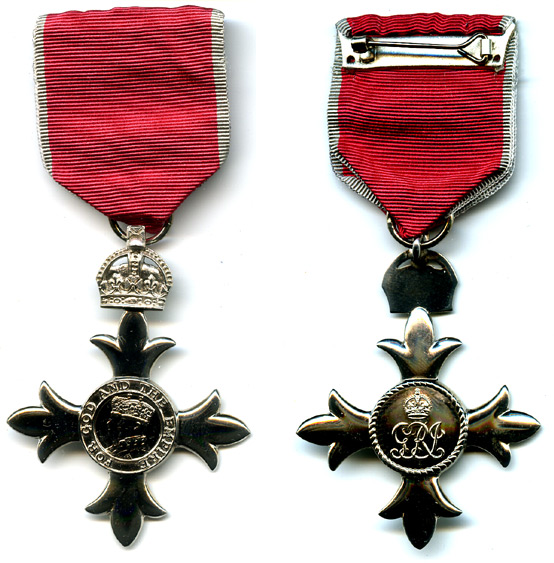
A Member of the Order of the British Empire (MBE) medal

The UK Government informed Bryks that he was to be made a Member of Order of the British Empire (MBE) in recognition of his escapes as a PoW and the help he gave to other escapees. He was invited to Buckingham Palace in London to be decorated. But the Communist authorities refused to grant him a visa to leave Czechoslovakia. Therefore, the UK Ambassador to Czechoslovakia presented Bryks with his MBE at the UK Embassy in Prague.

=== Three trials ===
Just after midnight on the night of 2–3 May 1948, the StB secret police arrested Bryks at his home in Olomouc. He was charged with involvement in an alleged attempt by other former RAF airmen, including Air Marshal Karel Janoušek, to escape to the West. Bryks was court-martialled in Prague between 14 and 16 July 1948 and was found not guilty, because Communists did not yet control these courts. But the prosecutor appealed and Bryks remained in prison.

Bryks was retried on 2 September 1949. By now the Communists controlled the courts. He was found guilty and sentenced to 10 years imprisonment. He was stripped of his rank and medals and expelled from the air force. His wife obtained an exit visa for herself and their young daughter, stating that it was to pay her parents in England a short visit. In fact, she left Czechoslovakia for the duration of the Communist era, and did not return until 2009.

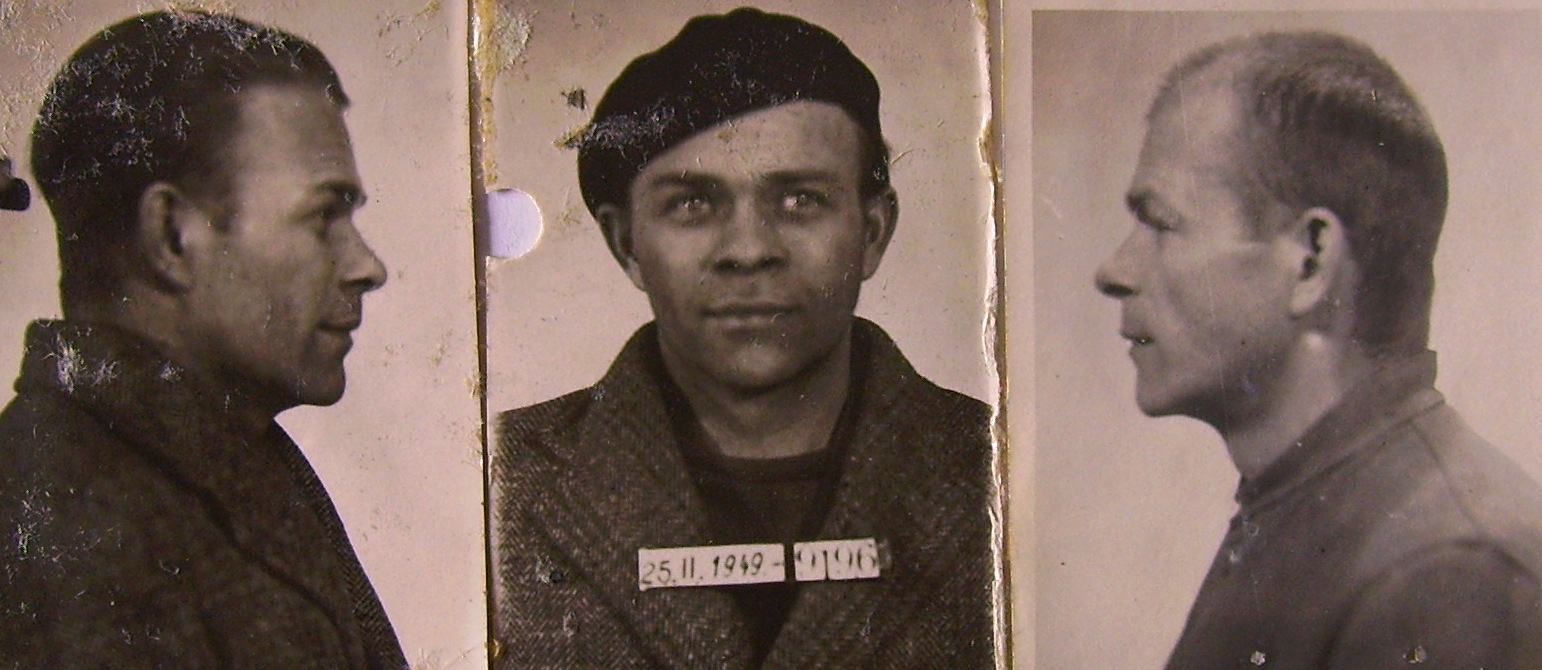
Bryks as a prisoner in Bory prison in Plzeň in 1949

After his conviction, Bryks was held first in Pankrác, in the same prison where the Gestapo had held him in 1944. On 17 August 1949, he was transferred to Bory prison in Plzeň. On 18 April, the prison authorities announced that they had uncovered a plan for a prison uprising and mass escape. Bryks was among those accused of the allaged plot. He was tried on 11 May 1950 and found guilty. His sentence was extended with 20 years hard labour and he was fined Kčs 20,000. His wife protested to the General Secretary of the Communist Party of Czechoslovakia, Rudolf Slánský, but received no answer.

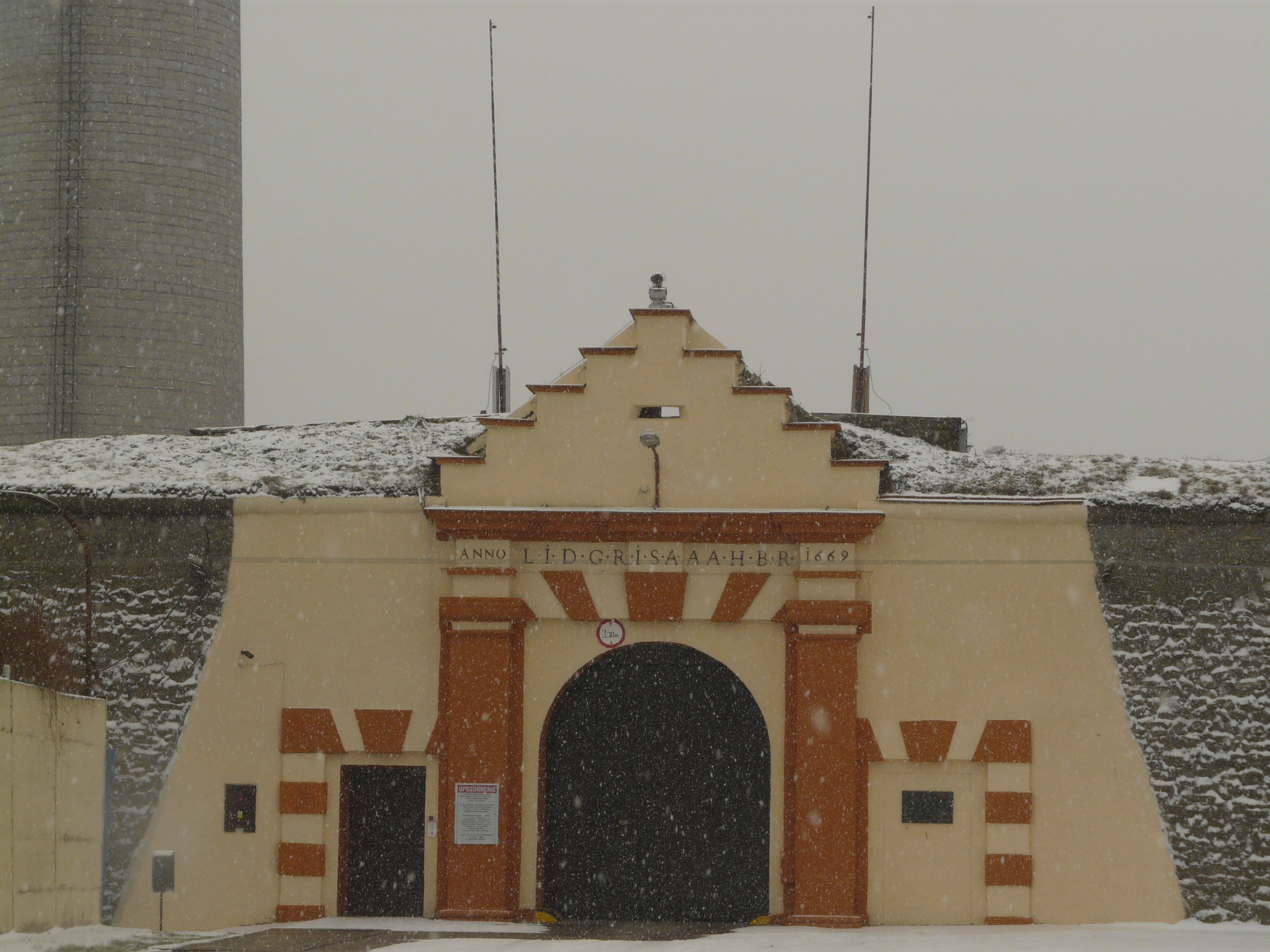
The entrance to Leopoldov Prison, where Bryks was held from June 1952

On 6 November 1950, Bryks was transferred to a prison at Opava in Czech Silesia. There were other former RAF political prisoners, included Karel Janoušek. Bryks was insubordinate and resisted the prison authorities. On 18 June 1952, he was transferred to Leopoldov Prison, a converted 17th-century fortress in Slovakia. There he continued to resist the prison authorities, and he was again accused of planning to escape.

=== Uranium mine and death ===
Finally he was moved to a prison in Ostrov nad Ohří in western Bohemia and made to work in a uranium mine called Rovnost (The Czech word for "Equality"). Here prisoners were paid a small wage for their work. Bryks worked hard, exceeding his work quotas, and sent his wage to help support his sick father and his wife and daughter. But in December 1955, the Communists banned Bryks from sending money to his family.

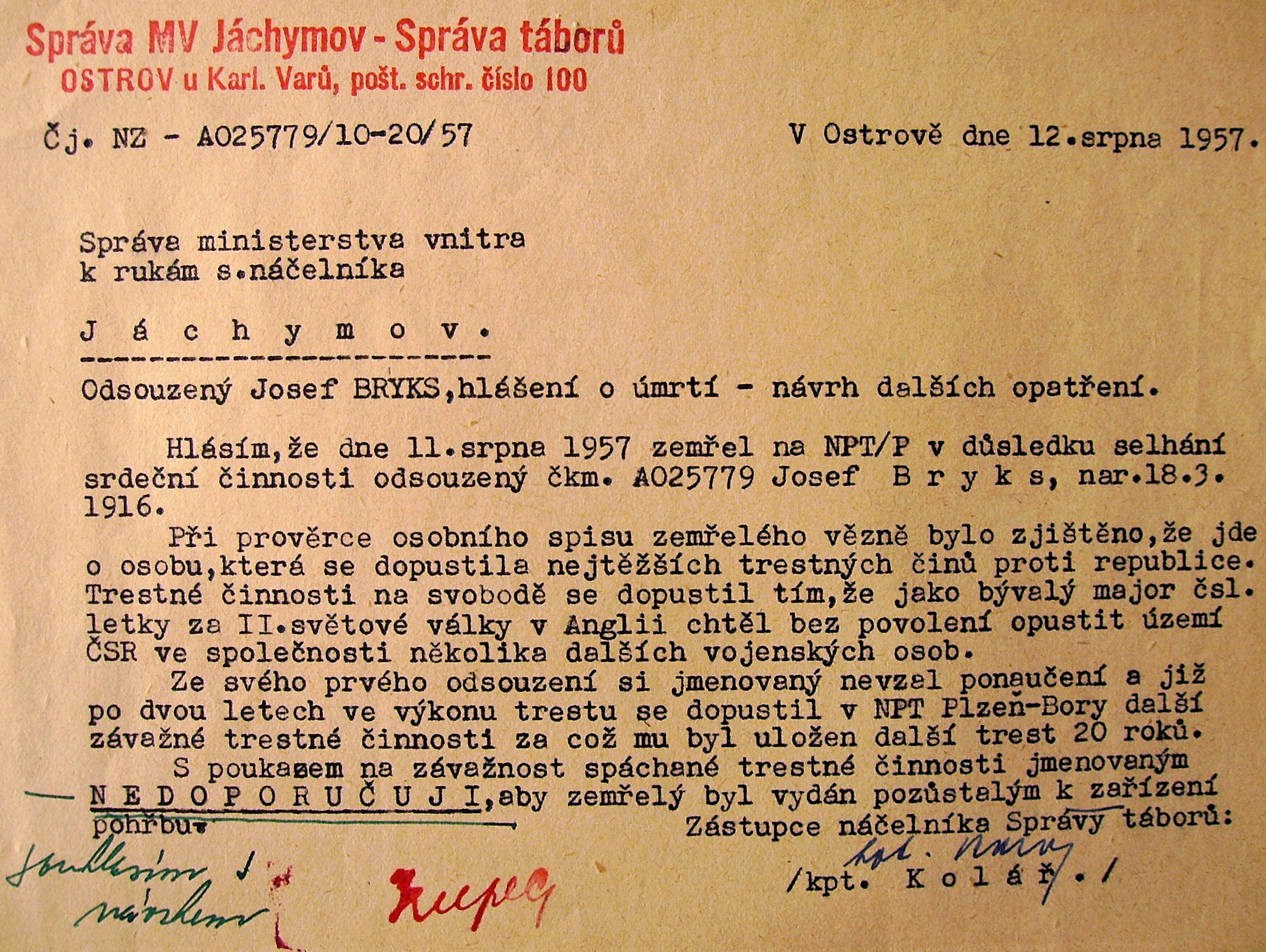
Interior Ministry note dated 12 August 1957 recording Bryks' death

Bryks resumed his resistance, but his health worsened. On 11 August 1957, he suffered a massive heart attack. He died in the prison hospital at Ostrov nad Ohří. The Communist authorities notified his wife in England in a brief telephone call, in which they gave her no further details.

Bryks' remains were not released to his family. The Communists secretly cremated him. Eight years later, in 1965, they buried his ashes in a cemetery in the Motol district of Prague.

== Rehabilitation and monuments ==
Bryks was rehabilitated after the November 1989 Velvet Revolution. On 29 May 1991, the Czech and Slovak Federative Republic posthumously promoted Bryks to colonel. A memorial plaque to him in front of the local war memorial at his birthplace in Lašťany was unveiled on 4 June 1994.

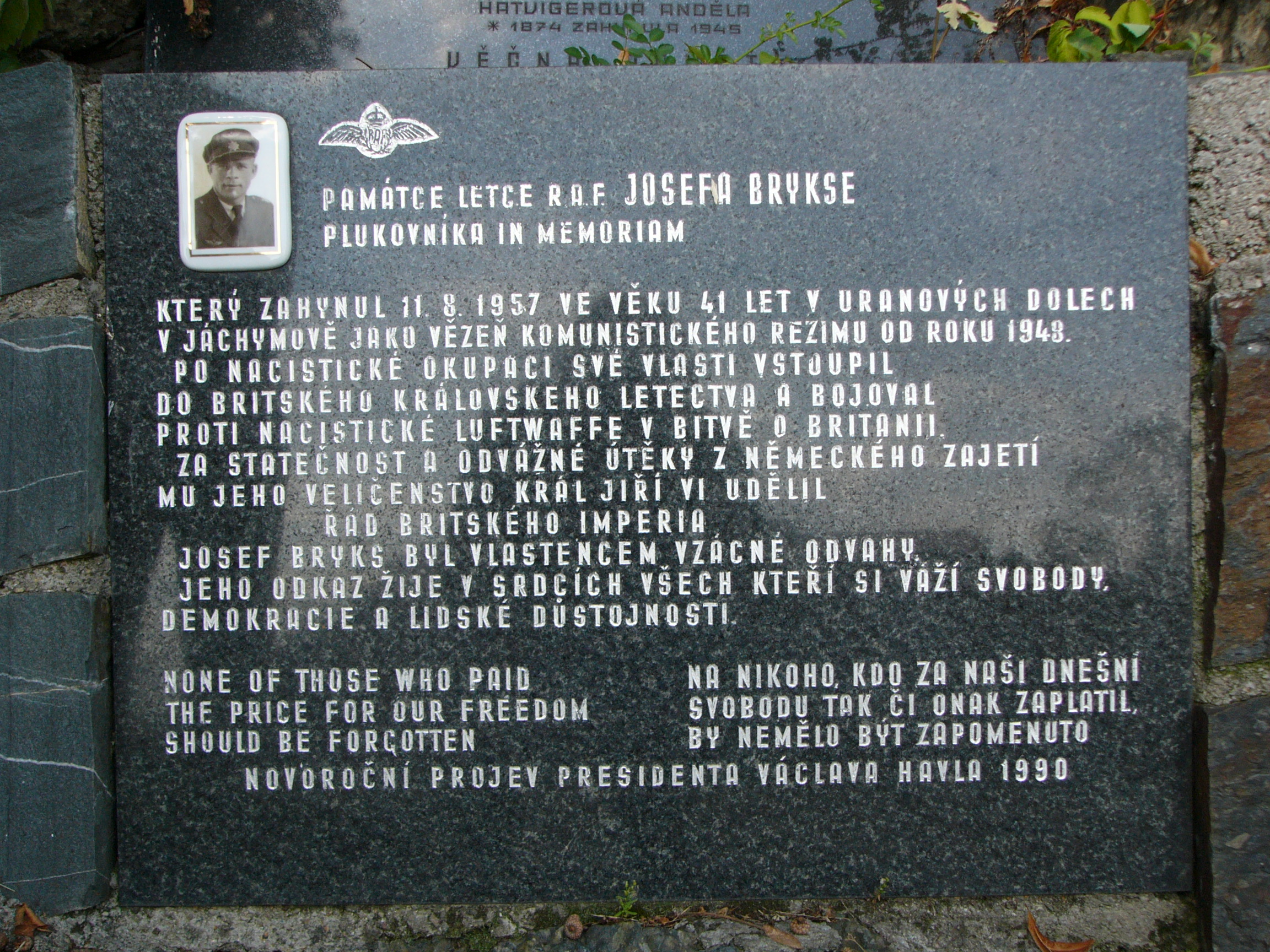
Memorial plaque to Josef Bryks in his birthplace Bělkovice-Lašťany, unveiled in 1994. Part of the Czech inscription reads: Josef Bryks was a patriot with precious courage. His legacy lives in the hearts of everybody, who esteem freedom, democracy and human dignity.

In 2004, Bryks was honoured with the "Award of the City of Olomouc" for "bravery and courage during the Second World War". A memorial plaque was unveiled outside 5 Hanáckého pluku, Olomouc, where Bryks was living with his wife and daughter when the StB arrested him in 1948.

In 2006, a court in Prague finally exonerated him of his false convictions.

On 28 October 2006, the Czech Republic gave Bryks its highest award, the Order of the White Lion, military division, 2nd class. In 2008 the Czech Republic posthumously promoted Bryks to brigadier general.

Two streets are named after Bryks: one in the Černý Most suburb of Prague and the other in Slavonín on the edge of Olomouc.

In 2007, Czech Television made a documentary about Bryks, Muž, který přecenil českou duši aneb Útěky Josefa Brykse (lit. 'The Man Who Overestimated the Czech Soul or The Escapes of Josef Bryks'). The film includes an interview with his widow Gertrude.

In 2009, two historians found out about the secret burial in Motol in 1965 of the urn containing Bryks' ashes. With this information, his British widow, Gertrude Bryksová, was able to visit his grave, 52 years after his death.

== Honours and awards ==
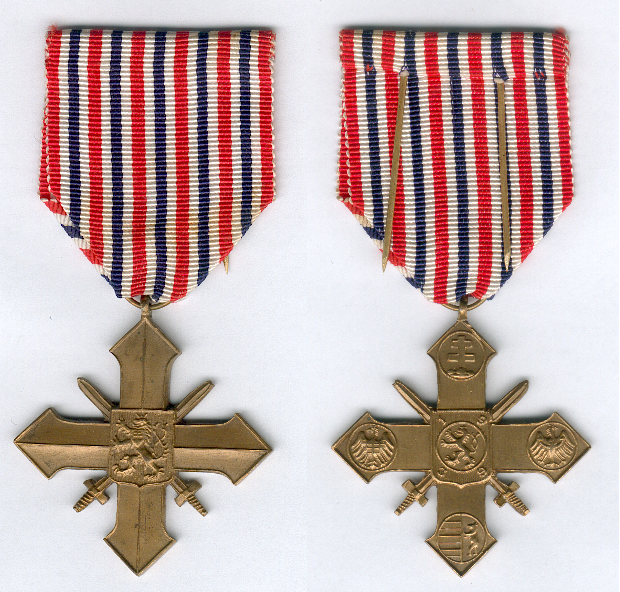
A Czechoslovak War Cross 1939–1945. Bryks was awarded this decoration three times.

Bryks was awarded numerous UK and Czechoslovak honours.

UK honours:

- Member of Order of the British Empire (MBE)
- 1939–1945 Star
- Air Crew Europe Star
- War Medal 1939–1945.

Czechoslovak honours:

- Czechoslovak War Cross 1939-1945 – three times
- Československá medaile Za chrabrost před nepřítelem ("Czechoslovak Medal For Gallantry in the Face of the Enemy") – twice
- Československá medaile Za zásluhy I. stupně ("Czechoslovak Military Medal for Merit, 1st class")
- Pamětní medaile čs. zahraniční armády ("Commemorative Medal of the Czechoslovak Army Abroad") with bars for Great Britain and France

== Bibliography ==
- Brown, Alan (2000). Airmen in Exile, The Allied Air Forces in WWII. Stroud: Sutton Publishing. ISBN 0-7509-2012-2.
