= Look and Learn =

British children's magazine, 1960s-80s

- Look and Learn cover page from 25 March 1972

Publication information
- Publisher: Fleetway
- Schedule: Weekly
- Publication date: 1962–1982
- No. of issues: 1049
- ISSN: 0262-6985

Creative team
- Artist(s): Fortunino Matania; John Millar Watt; Ron Embleton; Gerry Embleton; C. L. Doughty; Wilf Hardy; David Ashford; Angus McBride; Oliver Frey; James E. McConnell; Kenneth Lilly; R. B. Davis; Clive Uptton; Eric Parker

Look and Learn was a British weekly educational magazine for children published by Fleetway Publications Ltd from 1962 until 1982. It contained educational text articles that covered a wide variety of topics from volcanoes to the Loch Ness Monster; a long running science fiction comic strip, The Trigan Empire; adaptations of famous works of literature into comic-strip form, such as Lorna Doone; and serialized works of fiction such as The First Men in the Moon.

The illustrators who worked on the magazine included Fortunino Matania, John Millar Watt, Peter Jackson, John Worsley, Ron Embleton, Gerry Embleton, C. L. Doughty, Wilf Hardy, Dan Escott, Angus McBride, Oliver Frey, James E. McConnell, Kenneth Lilly, R. B. Davis and Clive Uptton.

It featured the Pen-Friends pages, a section where readers could make new friends overseas.

== Pre-publication history ==
Look and Learn was the brainchild of Leonard Matthews, the editorial director of juvenile publications at Fleetway Publications which was already publishing the long-running Children's Newspaper. An early attempt by Matthews to launch a new educational title along the lines of Italian educational magazines Conoscere and La Vita Meravigliosa had been turned down by the board of directors.

A British edition of Conoscere was brought out in 1961 under the title Knowledge and Matthews reassessed his original proposal and approached the board again, this time receiving the go-ahead to produce a dummy of the proposed magazine.

The dummy was put together by the firm's Experimental Art Department headed by David Roberts and Trevor Newton. David Stone, a former sub-editor with Everybody's Weekly, was appointed editor and, with the dummy approved, the magazine began publication. John Sanders replaced Stone as editor before the new title reached the newsstands.

== Publication history ==
The first issue of Look and Learn was dated 20 January 1962, and contained a wide spectrum of features ranging from articles on history (Rome, the Houses of Parliament, the story of King Charles I, "The Dover Road", "From Then Till Now"), science ("Eyes on Outer Space"), geography and geology (The Grand Canyon, "The Quest for Oil"), art (Vincent van Gogh), nature ("The story of a seed", "Your Very Own Basset Hound"), literature (The Arabian Nights, and its editor Sir Richard Burton), and travel ("The Children of Tokio"). The debut issue also contained the first episodes of "Three Men in a Boat" by Jerome K. Jerome and "The Children's Crusade" by Henry Treece, and a feature on the founding of the World Wildlife Fund.

The first issue of the magazine sold about 700,000 copies and settled down to a regular sale of over 300,000 copies a week. Its success has been put down to the high quality of the magazine's content. Historian Steve Holland said, "The premise of Look and Learn was to delight and inspire the imaginations of its young readers. To advance this principle, the features were clearly and briskly written and illustrated by some of the finest artists of the era resulting in a magazine of unmatched quality."

The first major change to the contents of the magazine came in 1966 when it incorporated Ranger with issue 232 (25 June 1966). The amalgamation brought with it a number of comic strips including The Rise and Fall of the Trigan Empire, written by Mike Butterworth and drawn by Don Lawrence, and the French comic strip Asterix, translated into English. The adventure Asterix and Cleopatra appears under the title In the Days of Good Queen Cleo, with the Gauls turned into Ancient Britons and Asterix and Obelix renamed "Beric" and "Doric".

This amalgamation was overseen by recently appointed editor John Davies who had replaced Sanders when the latter left to edit the short-lived Ranger in 1965. Davies had previously edited The Children's Newspaper until it merged with Look and Learn (issue 173, 8 May 1965).

It amalgamated with its competitor Finding Out in 1967.

Davies continued the magazine with the same mixture as before (the page count of the magazine having increased from 32 pages to 36 to accommodate the additional content), as did the editors who followed him, Andy Vincent (1969–1977) and Jack Parker (1977–1982).

The magazine absorbed World of Wonder in March 1975, and Speed & Power with issue no. 724 (29 November 1975).

Under Parker's editorship the magazine underwent a facelift with issue 844 (18 March 1978), absorbed World of Knowledge in early 1981, and celebrated its 1,000th issue on 9 May 1981. Sales had been declining throughout the 1970s, a decade which saw the price of the magazine rise from 7½ pence to 30 pence due to sharply increasing production costs. Price increases in the early 1980s added a further 10 pence to the weekly cost, and the editor admitted "we simply do not sell enough to meet the very heavy cost of producing a magazine of the quality of Look and Learn and we are therefore unable to continue publication."

Look and Learn folded with issue 1049, dated 17 April 1982.
