= Going a Bundle =

British children's TV series (1974–1976)

Going A Bundle was a Southern TV children's television series hosted by Harry Fowler and Kenny Lynch shown between 1974 and 1976 . The series also featured James Villiers and Anne Aston. Six twenty-five-minute episodes were made.
