= Felix Barker =

English journalist, drama critic and historian

- Born: Richard Felix Raine Barker; 7 May 1917; London, England
- Died: 11 July 1997 (aged 80)
- Education: Felsted School; Choate Rosemary Hall
- Occupations: Journalist, drama critic, historian
- Spouse: Anthea Francis Gotch (m. 1950)
- Children: 2
- Parent(s): Anthony Raine Barker; Patricia Russell

Richard Felix Raine Barker (7 May 1917 – 11 July 1997) was an English journalist, drama critic and historian. He is known for having been the youngest dramatic critic on Fleet Street.

== Biography ==
Barker was born in London on the 7th of May 1917, the son of architect Anthony Raine Barker and his wife, photographer Patricia Russell. He was educated at Felsted School before attending the Choate School in Connecticut as part of a student exchange programme. He married Anthea Francis Gotch in 1950. Felix Barker died on 11 July 1997.

== Career ==
Barker began his career in his late teens reporting for the Evening News. Two well-received pieces, one on school life and the other on the 1936 Crystal Palace fire, earned him a weekly column as the paper's amateur drama critic at the age of 19, making him the youngest dramatic critic working on Fleet Street. During World War II he served as private and later a sergeant in the Gordon Highlanders where he helped run the theatrical entertainment group, the Balmorals. After the war he rejoined the Evening News, becoming a feature writer in 1946, the deputy drama critic later that same year, and the chief critic in 1958.

In 1960, Barker expanded his work to include film criticism, making him one of the few critics at the time who was working in both theatre and film. He became the president of The Critics' Circle in 1974. Throughout his career as a critic, Barker also established himself as an author and historian, publishing such works as The Oliviers (1953), The House that Stoll Built (1957), London: 2000 Years of a City and its People (1974, with Peter Jackson), London as it Might Have Been (1982, with Ralph Hyde), The Black Plaque Guide to London (1987, with Denise Silvester-Carr), The History of London in Maps (1990, again with Peter Jackson) and Greenwich and Blackheath Past (1993). His final book Edwardian London, was published in 1995. A posthumous publication was issued by the London Topographical Society, numbered 167, which represented another important collaboration with artist Peter Jackson, entitled The Pleasures of London (2008), and edited by Ann Saunders and Denise Silvester-Carr.

In retirement he lived in Benenden in Kent where he landscaped the grounds of the 15th century Wealden Hall house his father Anthony Raine Barker had extensively restored from the 1930s. He had two children, Kent Barker (1953–) and Maxine Barker (1956–1992).
