= Hell Is Sold Out =

1951 British film by Michael Anderson

- Lobby card
- Directed by: Michael Anderson
- Screenplay by: Guy Morgan; Nick Salamon
- Based on: Satan Refuse du Monde by Maurice Dekobra
- Produced by: Raymond Stross
- Starring: Mai Zetterling; Herbert Lom; Richard Attenborough; Hermione Baddeley; Nicholas Hannen; Olaf Pooley
- Cinematography: Jack Asher
- Edited by: Hazel Wilkinson
- Music by: Hans May
- Production company: Zelstro Productions
- Distributed by: Eros Films (UK); Realart Pictures (US)
- Release date: 23 July 1951
- Running time: 85 minutes
- Country: United Kingdom
- Language: English
- Budget: £70,000

Hell Is Sold Out is a 1951 British drama film directed by Michael Anderson and starring Mai Zetterling, Herbert Lom and Richard Attenborough. The film was written by Guy Morgan and Moie Charles, from an adaptation by Nick Salamon of the 1947 novel Satan Refuse du Monde by Maurice Dekobra. It was the first producing credit from Raymond Stross.

== Plot ==
A Swedish-born woman, Valerie Martin, posing as the widow of French Resistance novelist Dominic Danges, ensconces herself at his home after the end of the Second World War, and after having written under his name "Hell is Sold Out", a best selling novel. She did this after finding that the last book published under his name was a republication of her diary, "Boundless Ecstasy", found by his publisher among his writings when he was thought dead; he had been taken prisoner during the war.

He returns home. The tangle ensues putting the reputations of all involved at risk because there is interest in the book to be serialized, made into a film, and reshape his reputation in the US as a former ladies man. They argue and in order to return to Sweden, she calls on Pierre Bonnet, a fellow prisoner of Dominic. She confesses to Pierre that she and Dominic are unmarried, and does not want Dominic to know of her whereabouts. A love triangle develops when Pierre falls in love with her.

Pierre falls ill due to shrapnel in his head, and she is found out when she encounters Dominic in Pierre's room. Dominic lets known that he is not the author of the best seller. Dominic and Pierre have a heart to heart. Pierre misleads Valerie into believing that Dominic has dedicated his latest work to her. They reconcile.

== Cast ==
- Mai Zetterling as Valerie Martin
- Herbert Lom as Dominic Danges
- Richard Attenborough as Pierre Bonnet
- Hermione Baddeley as Mme. Louise Menstrier
- Nicholas Hannen as François
- Olaf Pooley as Cheri, male secretary
- Eric Pohlmann as Louis, the proprietor
- Mara Lane as Midinette
- Kathleen Byron as Arlette de Balzamann
- Joan Young as Mrs. Gertrude de Montfort Cole
- Althea Orr as Mrs. Eunice Weinhardt
- Virginia Bedard as Mrs. Irma Reinhardt
- Joan Hickson as Hortense, the housekeeper

== Release ==
The film is on Blu-ray. Amazon.com released the film on DVD on 31 August 2010.

== Critical reception ==
The Monthly Film Bulletin wrote: "This melodramatically titled film turns out to be a curious and rather uncertain mixture of drama and farce. The result is not unattractive, the somewhat uneventful story and flat dialogue being jerked into life by Michael Anderson's intelligent, if uneven, direction. Mai Zetterling, hampered by hideous gowns, is adequate, her various accomplishments being painstakingly displayed (she sings). Herbert Lom looks a little unsure of himself in the unfamiliar role of a heart breaker, but will probably please. Richard Attenborough's boyish and rather comic charm is well exploited. There is a scathing depiction of three American types who claim to represent the women of America. Music is well used. Photography is often noticeably bad."

TV Guide wrote, "despite the portentous title, this is a farce, and a good one at that."
