= Scarlet Thread =

1951 film by Lewis Gilbert

- Theatrical release poster
- Directed by: Lewis Gilbert
- Written by: Moie Charles; A.R. Rawlinson
- Produced by: Ernest G. Roy
- Starring: Kathleen Byron; Laurence Harvey
- Cinematography: Geoffrey Faithfull
- Music by: Kenneth D. Morrison
- Distributed by: Butcher's Film Service (UK); Realart Pictures (US)
- Release date: 1951
- Running time: 85 mins.
- Country: United Kingdom
- Language: English

Scarlet Thread is a 1951 British second feature ('B') crime drama film directed by Lewis Gilbert and produced by Ernest G. Roy. It was written by Moie Charles and A.R. Rawlinson.

== Plot ==
Two criminals plan a jewellery robbery. The robbery goes wrong and an innocent man is shot.

== Cast ==
- Kathleen Byron as Josephine
- Laurence Harvey as Freddie
- Sydney Tafler as Marcon
- Arthur Hill as Shaw
- Dora Bryan as Maggie
- Eliot Makeham as Jason
- Harry Fowler as Sam
- Cyril Chamberlain as Mason
- Renee Kelly as Eleanor
- Hylton Allen as the Dean

== Production ==
The film was made at Nettlefold Studios, Walton-on-Thames in Surrey, England, and on location.

== Reception ==
The Monthly Film Bulletin wrote: "Sydney Tafler and Laurence Harvey do well as the unattractive pair of gangsters, and the characterisation and dialogue are as a whole more effective than the improbable story."

Kine Weekly wrote: "Well-made, if slightly far-fetched romantic melodrama ... Unusual and intriguing story, exciting climax, feminine angle, and quota."

In The Radio Times Guide to Films Allen Eyles gave the film 2/5 stars, writing: "In one of his early leading roles, Laurence Harvey working with Alfie director Lewis Gilbert gives this downbeat British crime drama some modest interest. Harvey is convincingly unpleasant as the skirt-chasing spiv and petty criminal with a sleazy charm, who panics and kills a bystander during a jewel robbery. But the twist in the tale is more implausible than ironic."
