= Peter Jackson (artist) =

British artist (1922–2003)

Peter Jackson's London Is Stranger Than Fiction strip which appeared on 10 August 1949

Peter Charles Geoffrey Jackson (4 March 1922, in Brighton – 2 May 2003, in Northwood, London) was a British artist noted for his cartoon strip London is Stranger Than Fiction.

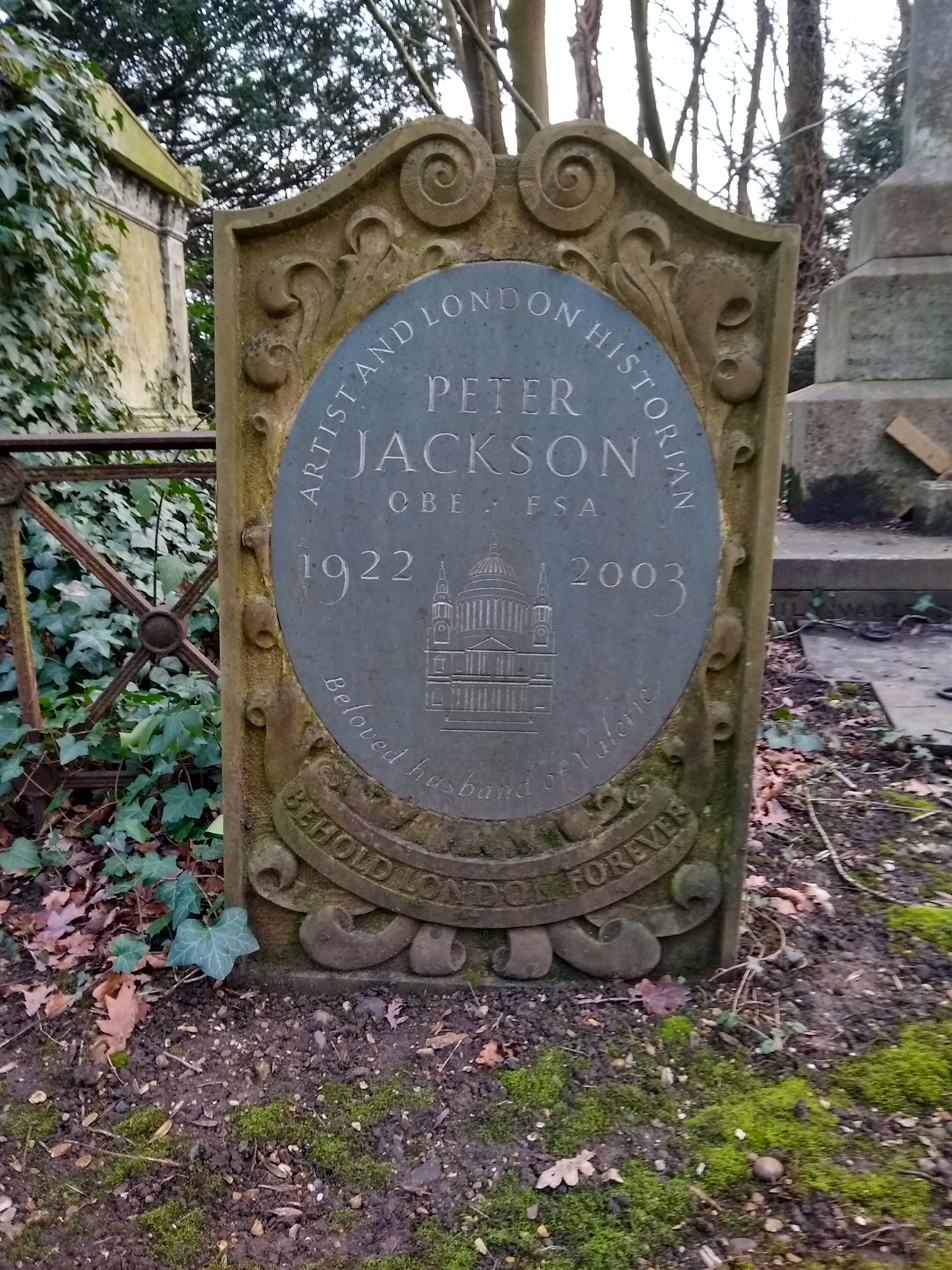
Grave of Peter Jackson at Highgate Cemetery

== Career ==
Jackson showed a talent for illustration from childhood. He attended Hove High School and then Willesden School of Art.

He submitted some sketches to the newspaper unsolicited in 1949 and through a lucky coincidence the paper was looking for an artist to do a strip about London at that time. He was hired and the strip become a success, giving rise to books of compilations of his work. The London Is Stranger Than Fiction strip ran every Wednesday in the London Evening News newspaper. The strip featured quirky and little known historical facts about London in an easy to read illustrated cartoon strip. The strip ran continuously from 1949 until the paper closed for good in 1980.

He also authored the "Saul of Tarsus" cartoon, which appeared in the first issues of the Eagle comic and reflected Jackson's religious faith. His work also appeared in the children's educational comics Look and Learn and Treasure .

Jackson also became a notable collector of antiques and documents relating to the history of London. The Ephemera Society, presented Jackson with the Samuel Pepys Medal for his contribution to ephemera studies. He co-authored a number of books on London and its history with Felix Barker.

== Personal life ==
Peter Jackson married Valerie Harris in 1995. He is buried at Highgate Cemetery (West).

== Publications ==
- London is Stranger than Fiction (1951)
- London Explorer (1953)
- Tallis's London Street Views (1969)
- London Bridge (1971)
- London: 2000 Years of a City and its People (1974), with Felix Barker
- George Scharf's London: Sketches and Watercolours of a Changing City, 1820-50 (1987)
- The History of London in Maps (1990), with Felix Barker
- Walks in Old London (1993)
- Drawings of Westminster by Sir George Scharf (1994)
- London Bridge: A Visual History (2002)
- The Pleasures of London (2008), posthumous with Felix Barker
- Peter Jackson's London is Stranger Than Fiction (2012), posthumous
