= Bělkovice-Lašťany =

- Municipality
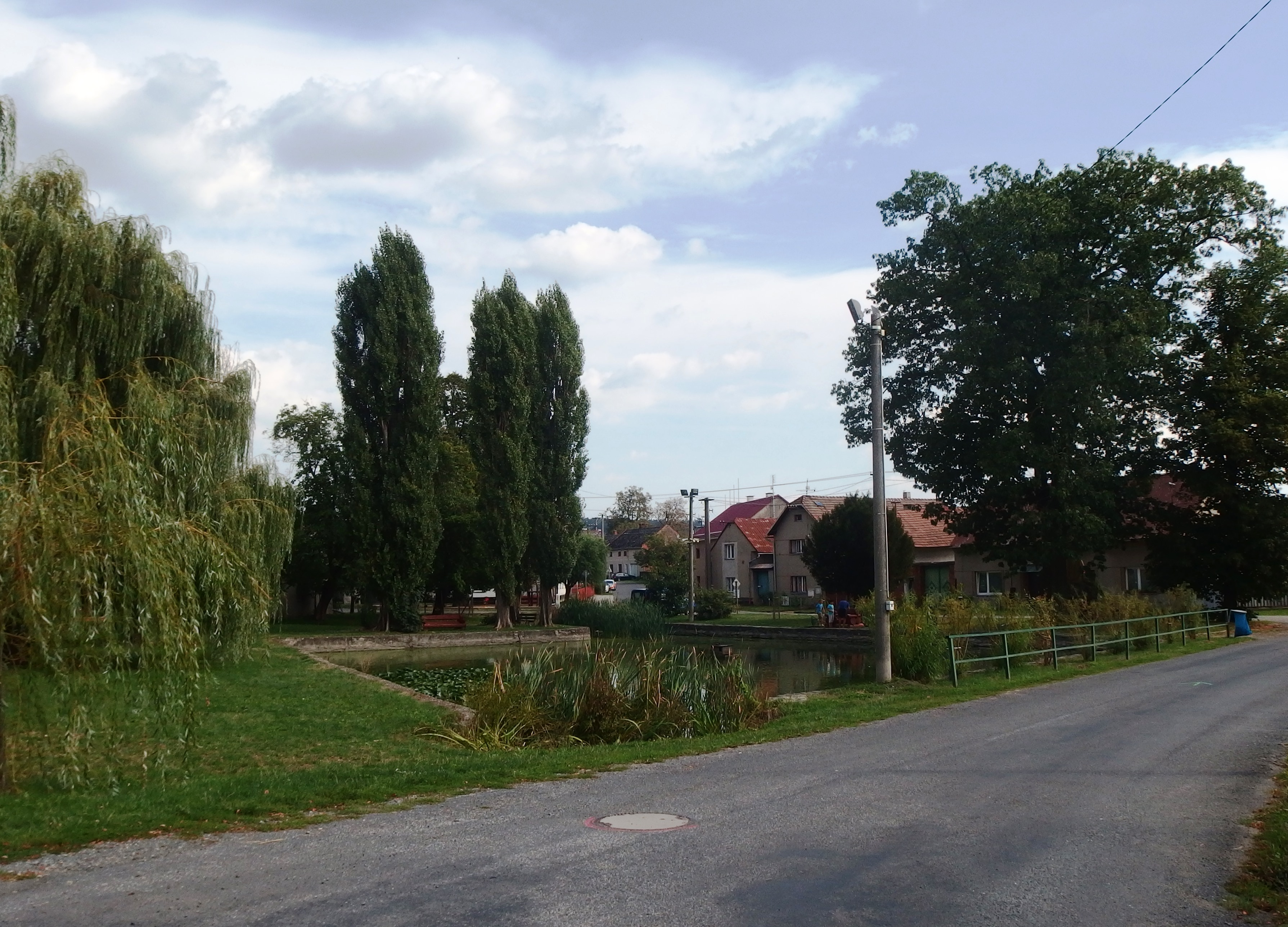
- Common in Lašťany

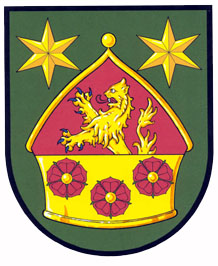
- Flag Coat of arms

- Location in the Czech Republic
- Coordinates: 49°40′7″N 17°19′2″E
- Country: Czech Republic
- Region: Olomouc
- District: Olomouc
- First mentioned: 1078

Area
  - Total: 15.30 km^{2} (5.91 sq mi)
- Elevation: 258 m (846 ft)

Population (2026-01-01)
  - Total: 2,315
  - Density: 151.3/km^{2} (391.9/sq mi)
- Time zone: UTC+1 (CET)
  - Summer (DST): UTC+2 (CEST)
- Postal code: 783 15
- Website: www.belkovice-lastany.cz

Bělkovice-Lašťany is a municipality and village in Olomouc District in the Olomouc Region of the Czech Republic. It has about 2,300 inhabitants.

== Geography ==
Bělkovice-Lašťany is located about 9 kilometres (6 mi) north of Olomouc. It lies on the border between the Upper Morava Valley and Nízký Jeseník range. The highest point is at 440 m (1,440 ft) above sea level. The stream Trusovický potok flows through the municipality.

== History ==
The first written mention of Lašťany is from 1078. Bělkovice was first mentioned in 1238. In 1960, Bělkovice and Lašťany were merged and today they form one integral municipality.

== Demographics ==
Historical population

| Year | Pop. | ±% |
|---|---|---|
| 1869 | 1,376 | — |
| 1880 | 1,480 | +7.6% |
| 1890 | 1,483 | +0.2% |
| 1900 | 1,468 | −1.0% |
| 1910 | 1,562 | +6.4% |

| Year | Pop. | ±% |
|---|---|---|
| 1921 | 1,628 | +4.2% |
| 1930 | 1,897 | +16.5% |
| 1950 | 1,645 | −13.3% |
| 1961 | 1,821 | +10.7% |
| 1970 | 1,805 | −0.9% |

| Year | Pop. | ±% |
|---|---|---|
| 1980 | 1,905 | +5.5% |
| 1991 | 1,819 | −4.5% |
| 2001 | 1,854 | +1.9% |
| 2011 | 2,101 | +13.3% |
| 2021 | 2,271 | +8.1% |

Source: Censuses

== Transport ==
The I/46 road (heading from Olomouc to Opava and the Czech–Polish border) runs through the municipality.

== Sights ==
The only protected cultural monument in the municipality is a border stone from 1739.

== Notable people ==
- Josef Bryks (1916–1957), fighter pilot and political prisoner
- Alois Kaňkovský (born 1983), cyclist
- Martin Pospíšil (born 1991), footballer
