= Anne Aston =

Scottish actress and television presenter (born 1948)

- Born: Anne Lloyd; 1 January 1948 (age 78); Glasgow, Scotland
- Occupations: Game Show hostess Actress
- Years active: 1969–1994
- Height: 5 ft 4 in (1.63 m)
- Spouse: Eddie Trevett (m. 1986)

Anne Aston (born Anne Lloyd, 1 January 1948) is an actress and television presenter best known as the hostess of The Golden Shot in the late 1960s and early 1970s.

== Early career and The Golden Shot ==
Born Anne Lloyd on New Year's Day 1948 in Glasgow, she grew up from the age of three weeks old in West Bromwich in Sandwell and attended West Bromwich Technical High School. She was a supporter and season ticket holder at local football club, West Bromwich Albion. After leaving school she worked for the travel agency run by her father, Lewis Lloyd, before auditioning successfully for The Golden Shot where she made her debut, aged 21, on 12 January 1969. Aston said, "100 girls were interviewed and the number was reduced to seven for the final audition and then I was chosen". The Golden Shot was her first show, which was broadcast live in black and white on Sunday afternoons at 5pm. Her surname was changed, as directed by the actors' union Equity, from Lloyd to Aston to avoid confusion with an actress who had the same name at the time. It was chosen in reference to Aston, Birmingham, the location of the studios where the Golden Shot was produced. On the show she gave the appearance of struggling to cope with the simple arithmetic needed to calculate the contestants' scores – this was later perceived as stereotyping but, in fact, she admitted she found that part of the job difficult. At its peak the show was being watched by 16 million viewers and Aston was receiving over 100 fan mail letters every week. She made many personal appearances and became a comic-book character nicknamed "The Hostess with the Mostess". In October, 1974 she made a recording called "I Can’t Stop Myself From Loving You Babe" on PYE Records (7N 45403-A), produced by Martin Rushent, however this failed to chart.

== Acting and later Television work ==
Her acting roles have included Up the Chastity Belt (1971) a British film in which she played the part of Princess Lobelia and the TV series Jason King (1971). In 1973, she had her theatrical debut in There's a Girl in My Soup. She has also starred in many productions including Carry on Laughing, where in 1976 she replaced Barbara Windsor and in 1979 appearing in the production of Peter Pan at the Birmingham Hippodrome. Other appearances have been with Ivor Emmanuel in Aladdin at the Grand Theatre, Swansea in 1978 as well as with Frankie Howerd in Cinderella at Theatre Royal, Hanley, Stoke-on-Trent. She hosted several television programmes after leaving the Golden Shot which have included Going a Bundle (she presented 11 episodes between 1975 and 1976) and All Kinds of Everything in 1982. Aston worked up until 1994, travelling extensively but made the decision to retire from work due to all the travelling involved.

== Business ventures ==
In 1974, Aston launched her own fashion line called Golden Made. During the 1980s, Aston ran a property business in Hampshire although she has now retired.

== Personal life ==
Aston was briefly engaged to film producer Chris Raphael in 1972, although she met her future husband and manager Eddie Trevett whom she started dating in January 1974, whilst in pantomime alongside Tony Blackburn. She married Trevett 12 years later in 1986 and has one stepson, Chris. She currently resides in Ringwood on the edge of the New Forest in Hampshire, where she has lived for over 30 years.
