= James E. McConnell =

James Edwin McConnell (15 July 1903 - 4 May 1995) was a British book and magazine cover artist best known for Western and historical subjects.

== Life ==
Born in Bedlington, Northumberland, McConnell worked for a local blockmaker before moving to London where he continued in the same trade whilst studying part-time at St. Martin's School. He went freelance in 1933, working through the Partridge Agency with whom he remained until 1953.

McConnell's early freelance work was in advertising and designing book covers. After the Second World War he established himself as one of the leading artists for the burgeoning paperback market. For British readers, his Western covers were the essence of the Wild West, albeit the Hollywood version, with their clean cut, square-jawed cowboy heroes riding through sun drenched landscapes.

McConnell was widely employed to tackle other genres, producing covers for Collins Crime Club and Thriller Book Club titles. He was one of the main cover artists on Look and Learn, the educational weekly, where he proved he was the master of any subject his editors required. Over the years, McConnell painted over 1,000 covers and frontispiece illustrations. He also contributed to the artwork in the American Roll of Honour, which lies in the American Chapel, St Paul's Cathedral, London.

As he was primarily a paperback cover artist, McConnell has rarely come to the attention of critics, although an exhibition of his Western artwork was held at the Association of Illustrators Gallery in London in 1976.
