= Booby Trap (film) =

1957 film by Henry Cass

- Lobby card
- Directed by: Henry Cass
- Written by: Peter Bryan
- Produced by: Bill Luckwell
- Starring: Sydney Tafler
- Cinematography: James Wilson
- Edited by: Robert Jordan Hill (as Robert Hill)
- Music by: Wilfred Burns
- Production company: Jaywell Productions
- Distributed by: Eros Films
- Release date: 1957
- Running time: 72 minutes
- Country: United Kingdom
- Language: English

Booby Trap is a 1957 black and white British comedy drama 'B' film, directed by Henry Cass and starring Tony Quinn, Harry Fowler and Sidney Tafler. It was written by Peter Bryan.

== Plot ==
Professor Hasdane has invented an explosive fountain pen, which will explode if it hears the first chime of Big Ben. The absent-minded professor leaves his briefcase, containing the pen, in a taxi. The next customer in the taxi, Sammy the spiv, takes the case. He pawns the pen. Sammy and Hasdane subsequently trace the pen to a seedy club operated by narcotics gangster Hunter, who distributes his drugs in mock fountain pens. Hunter unwittingly mixes up the Professor's pen with his own pens, and escapes pursued by the police. His car explodes when Big Ben chimes over the car radio.

== Cast ==
- Tony Quinn as Professor Hasdane
- Harry Fowler as Sammy
- Sydney Tafler as Mr. Hunter
- Patti Morgan as Jackie
- Jacques Cey as Bentley
- Richard Shaw as Paul Richards

== Crititical reception ==
The Monthly Film Bulletin wrote: "A lively, if juvenile, idea is sacrificed after the opening scenes, promising a suspense which never materialises. The development of this uninspired thriller is thin, the characters are pasteboard and the production is sparing."

Kine Weekly wrote: "The central idea is novel, but suspense and thrills are dissipated by indifferent acting and haphazard direction. It fizzles out like a damp squib ... Harry Fowler scores as spiv Sammy and Patti Morgan has her moments as a hostess, but Tony Quinn unblushingly hams as Hasdane, and so does Sydney Tafler as Hunter. Its opening army demonstration scene bores and it never recovers from the shaky start. The settings are nothing to shout about, either."

Picturegoer wrote: "Can bombs be funny? This neat British thriller is time-set for laughs as well as thrills. ...Cheers to writer Peter Bryan for a fast and funny plot. And to the cast. They make this one of the brightest 'B' films for some time."

In British Sound Films: The Studio Years 1928–1959 David Quinlan rated the film as "average" and wrote: "Bright comedy thriller, fast and amusing, misses on the thrills."

The Radio Times Guide to Films gave the film 1/5 stars, writing: "This dire British B-feature was barely seen when it first came out. [...] The build-up is feeble and none of the characters engage one's interest."
