= Guy Morgan (writer) =

British screenwriter (1908–1964)

Edward Guy Trice Morgan (6 February 1908 – 20 July 1964) was a British screenwriter.

Morgan was educated at Haileybury College and Merton College, Oxford, graduating in 1929. He worked as a journalist and film critic for the Daily Express. During the Second World War, Morgan served in the RNVR; he was wounded in a raid on a Yugoslav island, and became a POW.

After the war he wrote his first novel, The Captive Heart, which he sold to Ealing, launching his career. His other books included Only Ghosts Can Live (1945) and Adventures of the Sea Hawk. He was co-author of the play Albert R.N., which he later adapted as a screenplay. He also wrote early episodes of the Storm Nelson strip in Eagle.

Morgan married, and had a daughter. He died in 1964.

== Selected filmography ==
- The Captive Heart (1947)
- Counterblast (1948)
- Anna Karenina (1948)
- There Is Another Sun (1951)
- Hell Is Sold Out (1951)
- The Girl on the Pier (1953)
- Albert R.N. (1953)
- Love in Pawn (1953)
- Eight O'Clock Walk (1954)
- The Man in the Road (1957)
