= Charles Hasse =

British film editor (1904–2002)

Charles Hasse (1904–2002) was a British film editor.

== Selected filmography ==
- The Girl Who Forgot (1940)
- My Learned Friend (1943)
- The Halfway House (1944)
- Champagne Charlie (1944)
- Dead of Night (1945)
- The Captive Heart (1946)
- Hue and Cry (1947)
- Mrs. Fitzherbert (1947)
- Private Angelo (1949)
- Something in the City (1950)
- There Is Another Sun (1951)
- Night Was Our Friend (1951)
- Emergency Call (1952)
- The Fake (1953)
- Albert R.N. (1953)
- It's Never Too Late (1956)
- A Touch of the Sun (1956)
- She Didn't Say No! (1958)
