= The Captive Heart =

1946 British film by Basil Dearden

- Original British 1946 quad film poster
- Directed by: Basil Dearden
- Screenplay by: Angus MacPhail; Guy Morgan
- Story by: Patrick Kirwan
- Produced by: Michael Balcon; Michael Relph (associate producer)
- Starring: Michael Redgrave; Mervyn Johns; Basil Radford; Rachel Kempson
- Cinematography: Douglas Slocombe; Lionel Banes
- Edited by: Charles Hasse
- Music by: Alan Rawsthorne
- Production company: Ealing Studios
- Distributed by: General Film Distributors
- Release date: 29 April 1946
- Running time: 104 minutes
- Country: United Kingdom
- Language: English

The Captive Heart is a 1946 British war drama, directed by Basil Dearden and starring Michael Redgrave. It was written by Angus MacPhail and Guy Morgan. It is about a Czechoslovak Army officer who is captured in the Fall of France and spends five years as a prisoner of war, during which time he forms a long-distance relationship with the widow of a British Army officer. The film was entered into the 1946 Cannes Film Festival.

The film is partly based on the true story of a Czechoslovak officer in the RAF Volunteer Reserve, Josef Bryks MBE, and his relationship with a British WAAF, Gertrude Dellar, who was the widow of an RAF pilot.

== Plot ==
In 1940, Czechoslovak Army Captain Karel Hašek escapes from Dachau and reaches France during the German invasion. He assumes the identity of a dead British officer, Geoffrey Mitchell, and becomes a prisoner of war after the German victory. Hašek is initially suspected of being a spy by the British prisoners, because he can speak German and no one else from Mitchell's unit was captured. Some wish to lynch him. But Major Dalrymple, the senior British officer, hears Hašek out and believes him, especially after Gestapo agent Forster visits the camp. Forster ran Dachau during Hašek's stay, and eyes Hašek suspiciously. To avoid exposure, Hašek must maintain the fiction that Mitchell is still alive. He gets a letter from Mitchell's abandoned wife Celia, reminding her husband of their two children and hoping to rekindle their marriage. Since the Germans read all prisoner correspondence, Hašek decides he must respond as if he were Mitchell, now returning Celia's affection. They exchange many letters, and develop a relationship.

Forster visits the camp several times, and Hašek fears he may be unmasked. Forster compliments him on his nearly perfect German and seems to recognise him, but cannot quite place him. Later, after almost four years captivity, Forster tells Hašek he knows he is not Mitchell and that his photograph has been sent to Berlin for identification. Soon after, it is announced that some prisoners are to be repatriated, but when Hašek goes for his medical exam, he is turned away.

The other prisoners devise a plan to save him without his knowledge. Private Mathews is on the repatriation list and volunteers to let Hašek go in his place. Major Dalrymple, Hašek's friend Lieutenant Stephen Hardy, and Mathews (a burglar in civilian life) break into the Kommandant's office and replace "Mathews" with "Mitchell" on the list. The plan works, and Hašek is "returned" to Britain.

Celia goes to meet the repatriation group, but is baffled when her husband does not appear. Hašek explains his situation to the British authorities, and enrolls in the Free Czechoslovak Army. He also travels to Celia's residence and breaks the news of her husband's death and his impersonation. She is devastated, and Hašek leaves. After she recovers, however, she rereads his letters, realizing that she has fallen in love with the writer. When Hašek calls her on the telephone on V-E Day, she is eager to speak with him.

== Cast ==
- Michael Redgrave as Capt. Karel Hašek [alias Geoffrey Mitchell]
- Rachel Kempson as Celia Mitchell
- Frederick Leister as Mr. Mowbray
- Mervyn Johns as Pte. Evans
- Rachel Thomas as Dilys Evans
- Jack Warner as Cpl. Horsfall
- Gladys Henson as Flo Horsfall
- James Harcourt as Doctor
- Gordon Jackson as Lieut. David Lennox
- Elliott Mason as Mrs. Lennox (as Elliot Mason)
- Margot Fitzsimons as Elspeth McDougall
- David Keir as Mr. McDougall
- Derek Bond as Lieut. Harley
- Jane Barrett as Caroline Harley
- Meriel Forbes as Beryl Curtiss
- Basil Radford as Major Ossy Dalrymple
- Guy Middleton as Capt. Jim Grayson
- Jimmy Hanley as Pte. Mathews
- Ralph Michael as Capt. Thurston
- Robert Wyndham as Lieut. Cdr. Robert Marsden
- Jack Lambert as Padre
- Karel Stepanek as Herr Forster
- Friedrich Richter as Camp Commandant (as Frederick Richter)
- Frederick Schiller as German M.O.
- Jill Gibbs as Janet Mitchell
- David Walbridge as Desmond Mitchell
- Sam Kydd as Pte. Grant

Many of the prisoners were played by serving soldiers.

== Production ==
Locations included the ex-naval prisoner of war camp Marlag, near Westertimke, which had remained largely intact after the end of the war the previous year, and Aston Rowant railway station.

== Reception ==
=== Box office ===
According to trade papers, the film was a "notable box office attraction" at the British box office in 1946.

The Washington Post said it was the fourth biggest hit at the British box office in 1946 after The Wicked Lady, The Bells of St Marys and Piccadilly Incident. According to Kine Weekly the "biggest winner" at the box office in 1946 Britain was The Wicked Lady, with The Captive Heart being a "runner up".

=== Critical ===
The Monthly Film Bulletin wrote: "The Captive Heart is a moving, sincere and often beautifully directed picture and should take its place among our more exceptional war films, if only for its finest moment, the return of Corporal Horsfall to his wife. The excellent music by Alan Rawsthorne endorses the policy of using the finest of our younger composers for the scoring of our more important films. Great trouble has been taken to authenticate the details of camp life, and Guy Morgan, a journalist who was himself a prisoner in Marlag Milag Nord, collaborated in the writing of the screenplay. The Unit was assisted by the B.A.O.R. in making the large-scale camp scenes, for which there can be nothing but praise."

Kine Weekly wrote: "Intensely moving melodrama built on the courage and good fellowship of a group of soldiers captured by the Germans in 1940. ... Human, authentic, thrilling and cleverly written story, subtle feminine angle and box-office cast."

Picture Show wrote: "This is a moving and dramatic story of a group of prisoners of war, captured in 1940. Their experiences, their memories, and behaviour give us a fine imprestion of the magnificent spirit and humour that buoys them up in separation and suffering. It is dominated by Michael Redgrave's brilliantly sensitive porayal of a Czech officer who assumes the identity of a dead British officer. The well-chosen cast are all excellent, and the direction is intelligent."
