= Cecil Langley Doughty =

British comics artist and illustrator (1913–1985)

Cecil Langley Doughty (7 November 1913 – 26 October 1985) was a British comics artist and illustrator, best known for his work in the comic Knockout and the educational weekly Look and Learn. His historical illustrations were used in a history book entitled 'Everyone's Story of Britain' (Sampson Low Publishers, 1966), where they pictured historical events in fascinating detail.

== Biography ==
Born in Withernsea, East Riding of Yorkshire, Doughty trained at Battersea Polytechnic, his earliest work comic strip appearing in Knockout and The Children's Newspaper in 1948. Doughty went on to draw Terry Brent for School Friend before finding his metier drawing historical strips for Thriller Comics, his first story adapting William Harrison Ainsworth's novel Windsor Castle followed by many stories featuring Robin Hood and Dick Turpin. In the late 1950s he also drew for Express Weekly and the Eagle, taking over the "Jack O'Lantern" strip in colour for eight months.

In 1962, Doughty began producing illustrations in black & white and colour for Look and Learn. He proved to be one of the paper's most successful historical illustrators, his work appearing over the full twenty-year history of the magazine. When Look and Learn closed in 1982, Doughty retired from commercial artwork to concentrate on landscapes. Already in his late sixties, Doughty held an exhibition of his paintings at Carmarthen, where he was then living.

C. L. Doughty died at the age of 71.
