= Clive Uptton =

British painter

Clive Uptton (12 March 1911 – 11 February 2006) was a widely regarded British illustrator and painter of landscapes and portraits.

== Biography ==
Uptton was born in Highbury, north London, the son of Clive Upton, who worked for Swain's, the engravers, as a touch-up artist and later for the Daily Mail newspaper.

Clive Uptton was educated at Brentwood Grammar School and Southend Art School before moving to London to attend the Central Art School and, later, Heatherley's School of Art. He began contributing professionally at the age of 19 before graduating from the Central Art School. When he noticed another artist named Upton was working for the Evening Standard, he added a second "t" to his surname so that their work would not be confused. From his studio in Cheapside, Uptton contributed illustrations to most of the major magazines of the day, including the Strand Magazine, Tit-Bits, Good Housekeeping, John Bull and The Sphere.

Between 1940 and 1942 Uptton was the political cartoonist of the Daily Sketch and the Sunday Graphic. During World War II, he also worked for the Ministry of Information producing cartoons and posters. After the war, he had a varied career as an illustrator and painter. He was a member of the Chelsea Arts Club, the Savage, and the London Sketch Club.

Uptton lived in Holland Park, west London, where he died shortly before his 95th birthday.
