= Wilfred Hardy =

British artist and illustrator

Wilfred 'Wilf' Hardy (7 July 1938 – 4 September 2016) was a British artist and illustrator who contributed many painted pages to Treasure, Look and Learn, Eagle and Speed and Power magazines. He also produced work for the Royal International Air Tattoo. He specialised in painting aircraft, producing posters and private commissions.

== Early life ==
Hardy was born in Brentford in Middlesex (West London).

== Aviation work ==
From 1976 to the 2000s Hardy produced work for the Royal International Air Tattoo airshow, formerly the International Air Tattoo. His first advertisement poster for the airshow featured a hovering Hawker Siddeley Harrier GR.1. His artwork for the next five shows included aircraft such as the Panavia Tornado GR.1, Lockheed Hercules and Hawker Siddeley Nimrod. For the 1983 edition, he helped create a design that would become commonplace for many years to come, with the aircraft heading straight towards the viewer. Over time this design was refined further with more aircraft being included and with the image being used principally on progranmmes rather than posters. The design can be seen on the 1994 and 1996 editions.

In 1979 Hardy designed the special paint scheme for a Royal Air Force McDonnell Douglas Phantom FGR.2 (XV424), and its backup (XV486), which was to re-enact the Transatlantic flight of Alcock and Brown for the 60th anniversary of the crossing.

Hardy also provided illustrations for other airshows and the cover of several editions of the Royal Air Force Yearbook.

== Personal life ==
Hardy lived in Kent. He married Barbara Woolstencroft in 1960 in Kent. They had three sons (born 1961, 1963 and 1965).
