= Gideon of Scotland Yard =

Gideon of Scotland Yard may refer to:

- George Gideon of Scotland Yard, fictional policeman created by John Creasey under the pen name J. J. Marric
- Gideon's Day, J. J. Marric's 1955 novel, reprinted as Gideon of Scotland Yard in 1958
- Gideon's Day (film), originally released as Gideon of Scotland Yard, 1958 film starring Jack Hawkins as George Gideon
- Gideon's Way, a 1964 British TV series starring John Gregson as George Gideon
