= The Long Arm (film) =

1956 British film by Charles Frend

- British film poster
- Directed by: Charles Frend
- Written by: Robert Barr; Janet Green
- Produced by: Michael Balcon
- Starring: Jack Hawkins
- Cinematography: Gordon Dines
- Edited by: Gordon Stone
- Music by: Gerard Schurmann
- Production company: Ealing Studios
- Distributed by: Rank Film Distributors (UK)
- Release date: June 1956 (UK)
- Running time: 96 minutes
- Country: United Kingdom
- Language: English

The Long Arm (USA title: The Third Key) is a 1956 British film noir police procedural crime film directed by Charles Frend and starring Jack Hawkins. It was based on a screenplay by Robert Barr and Janet Green, and produced by Michael Balcon. It was shot on location in London and Snowdonia in North Wales.

Hawkins played a similar role in John Ford's Gideon's Day (1958), based on books by John Creasey.

== Plot ==
When police respond to a burglar alarm at premises in Long Acre, Central London, they find nothing amiss after meeting the nightwatchman, who allows them to search the premises. However, the next day the safe, which had been opened with a key, is found empty. Superintendent Tom Halliday and his new Detective Sergeant Ward, begin searching for the fraudulent nightwatchman.

Halliday eventually concludes that the false nightwatchman has committed 14 safe-breaking jobs across the country, all on the same type of safe, and all completed with genuine keys. Visiting the safe manufacturer, Halliday gets the names of all current and former staff, but they are all cleared. When another safe is broken into, a young man on his way to work sees the thief climbing over the gate, and, realising something is wrong, tries to stop the thieves escaping but is deliberately run over by the getaway car. However, the victim manages to pass limited information to the police before dying. The hit-and-run vehicle is found in a scrapyard. The car has been stolen from a Mrs Elliot. Inside they find a newspaper that leads them to a garage in North Wales and to a Mr Gilson, a deceased former employee of the safe manufacturer.

Halliday finds that there are 28 more safes of the same type in London. He also finds that the thief is being tipped off by an insurance agent about which safes contain significant amounts of cash. The police arrange with the owner of a safe located in the Royal Festival Hall to let the insurance agent know about gala nights, which generate a lot of cash that will be stored in the safe overnight. They tail the insurance agent to a meeting with Mrs Elliot, the woman whose car was stolen. She is identified as Mrs Gilson, the wife of the apparently dead safe key maker.

Halliday and Ward deduce that Gilson faked his own death after spending years making duplicate keys for all the safes his company produced. Gilson breaks into the Royal Festival Hall, but the detectives are waiting. Mrs Gilson arrives and waits in her car in the nearby car park. After a short scuffle, Mr Gilson punches Ward and makes a run for it, but is soon re-captured by the police. Meantime, Halliday jumps on the bonnet of Mrs Gilson's car and breaks the windscreen, preventing Mrs Gilson from seeing where she is driving. Halliday is thrown from the car bonnet and lands on the ground. Both Mr and Mrs Gilson are arrested and the case is solved.

== Cast ==
- Jack Hawkins as Supt Tom Halliday
- John Stratton as Sergeant Ward
- Dorothy Alison as Mary Halliday
- Michael Brooke as Tony Halliday
- Sam Kydd as police control room operator
- Glyn Houston as police sergeant
- Richard Leech as Gilson, the burglar
- Newton Blick as Deputy Commander Harris
- Geoffrey Keen as Chief Superintendent Malcolm
- Sydney Tafler as Mr Stone
- Ursula Howells as Mrs Elliott (Mrs Gilson)
- Peter Burton as Mr Creasey, insurance agent
- George Rose as Slob, the informer
- Arthur Rigby as Detective Inspector at Chester
- Ralph Truman as Colonel Blenkinsop
- Ian Bannen as Stanley James, hit-and-run victim
- John Warwick as Detective Inspector at shipping office
- Joss Ambler as cashier at shipping office
- Harry Locke as secondhand dealer
- Alec McCowen as doctor in the hospital
- Nicholas Parsons as PC Bates
- Warwick Ashton as newspaper circulation manager
- David Davies as Welsh police constable
- John Welsh as house agent at Shepperton
- Richard Davies as a police officer at newsagent
- Maureen Delany as daily help
- Gillian Webb (actress) as the housewife in Shepperton
- Jameson Clark as Detective Superintendent Ogilvie
- William Mervyn as manager of the Royal Festival Hall
- Harold Goodwin as a librarian
- Meredith Edwards as Mr Thomas, garage owner

== Production ==
It was the last film made by Ealing under its agreement with Rank.

== Release ==
The film premiered at Gaumont Haymarket in London on 22 June 1956.

== Reception ==
The Monthly Film Bulletin wrote: "The last film to be made at Ealing Studios before the close-down, The Long Arm epitomises both the virtues and the weaknesses of the organisation. The film is competently photographed, decently acted and cleanly devoid of rough edges, yet as a thriller it is a trifle thin and unimaginative. The pseudo-documentary atmosphere, effective enough in itself, here tends to emphasise the plot's implausibilities. The personal asides (Halliday's jocular relations with his assistant and with his neglected but patient wife) fail really to humanise the characters: they remain impeccably reserved stereotypes. Jack Hawkins gives a conscientious performance as Halliday and makes the most of the script's few touches of humour, and John Stratton plays amiably as the eager Ward. There are some effective character studies from the supporting cast, notably Meredith Edwards' chatty and inquisitive Welsh garage proprietor and Gillian Webb's comically retiring housewife. The Long Arm does not attempt anything particularly original, but it is a generally efficient example of popular British film-making."

The reviewer for The Times was not impressed, and found the story implausible and "not quite clever enough" even though it used a documentary filming style.

In British Sound Films: The Studio Years 1928–1959 David Quinlan rated the film as "very good", writing: "Solid, well-knit police thriller. Dragnet with British accents."

== Accolades ==
The film won the Silver Bear for an Outstanding Single Achievement award at the 6th Berlin International Film Festival.
