= Robert Burnard =

Robert Burnard may refer to:

- Robert Burnard (painter)
- Robert Burnard (actor)
