= Burnard =

Burnard is a surname and a given name. Notable people called Burnard include:

Surname:

- Bonnie Burnard (1945–2017), Canadian short story writer and novelist
- Lou Burnard (born 1946), expert in digital humanities, text encoding and digital libraries
- Neville Northey Burnard (1818–1878), 19th-century English sculptor
- Norah Telford Burnard (1902–1979), New Zealand school dental supervisor and journal editor
- Robert Burnard (actor) (c. 1902 – 1950), English stage and radio actor
- Robert Burnard (painter) (1799/1800 – 1846/1847), Cornish painter
- Trevor Burnard (1961–2024), professor of American history at the University of Melbourne
- Verna Burnard (born 1956), Australian sprinter

Given name:

- Philip Burnard Ayres (1813–1863), British physician, botanist and plant collector
- Richard Burnard Munday (1896–1932), English flying ace with nine aerial victories during World War I
- Renfrey Burnard Potts (1925–2005), Australian mathematician notable for the Potts model
- John Burnard West FRCP (born 1928), respiratory physiologist who made major research contributions
- Hector Burnard White (1900–1969), Australian politician

== See also ==
- Burnard, a character from Mixels
- Barnard
- Bernard
