= Gideon's Wrath =

1967 novel by John Creasey

- First edition (UK)
- Author: John Creasey (as J.J. Marric)
- Genre: Detective fiction
- Publisher: Hodder & Stoughton (UK); Harper & Brothers (US)
- Publication date: 1967
- Media type: Print
- Followed by: Gideon's River

Gideon's Wrath is the thirteenth in a series of police procedural novels by John Creasey writing as J.J. Marric. Published in 1967, it centres on Commander George Gideon of the C.I.D., Scotland Yard.

== Plot summary ==
Gideon's Wrath sees Gideon wrestling with several major crimes, as well as debating whom to recommend to the Commissioner as his new Deputy Commander; Hobbs or Lemaitre?

Attacks are being mounted with explosives on places of worship throughout London. The Dean of St Ludd's approaches Gideon with his suspicions and a plan of action is formulated. As many police as can be spared are posted to guard the churches and synagogues; community volunteers are also placed on guard, much like the firewatchers during World War 2. The attacks stop temporarily, but then resume. Two perpetrators are arrested, but they will say nothing. Gideon eventually discovers that they belong to the ‘Simple Brethren’, a secretive group led and financed by lunatic millionaire Hector Marriott, who sees it as his mission to destroy what he considers idolatry.

The group's offices are raided and the members and their intended targets identified.

Whilst Gideon visits Paris to attend an Interpol meeting on gold smuggling, Marriott launches a final lone bombing of St Paul's Cathedral. He is apprehended, but escapes and commits suicide.

Gideon also oversees an investigation in which several young girls have been murdered. They are suspected of having been drugged after posing for pornographic photos. Toni Botelli, the main perpetrator, is eventually arrested after a tense stand-off at his premises. A drug smuggling operation is also uncovered.
