= Doreen Hawkins =

English actress

- Born: Doreen Mary Beadle; 13 July 1919; Southampton, England
- Died: 15 June 2013 (aged 93); Chelsea, London, England
- Other name: Doreen Lawrence
- Occupation: Actress
- Spouse: Jack Hawkins (m. 1947; died 1973)
- Children: 3

Doreen Mary Beadle (13 July 1919 – 15 June 2013), also known as Doreen Lawrence and by her married name Doreen Hawkins, was a British actress.

== Life ==
Hawkins was born in Southampton in 1919 and by the time she was four she had appeared on the stage. At the age of fifteen she was touring with an acting troupe where she was cast as the flirty teenager. She appeared under the name Doreen Lawrence. This was the start of her time in Repertory theatre where she would learn new parts and get regular work. When she was eighteen she was engaged to fellow actor Peter Cushing, but she decided not to marry him. She said that she broke off the engagement because he would bring his parents on dates and he was too easily moved to tears.

Acting in "rep" occupied her time until war broke out. As war broke out she wanted to help and the best opportunity was to join the Entertainments National Service Association (ENSA). She appeared in show to entertain the troops in West Africa, South Africa and Egypt. She was then sent to Bombay in India in 1944.

She belonged to an ENSA unit that was headed by Colonel Jack Hawkins.

The war ended in 1945 and she married Jack Hawkins. He was a leading man who was frequently cast as an army or navy character. Doreen is said to have given up her acting career after she married and devoted her time to her family, but she did appear in the 1948 film Hamlet.

Her husband died in 1973. She wrote an autobiography titled Drury Lane to Dinapur and died in 2013.

== Personal life ==
In 1947, she married Jack Hawkins who had a teenage daughter named Susan. Doreen was his second wife as he had married actress Jessica Tandy in 1932; they divorced in 1940. Hawkins and Doreen remained married until his death in 1973. Together they had three children, Caroline (b. 1955), Andrew (1950), and Nicholas (1948) Hawkins.
