= Judith (1966 film) =

1966 drama film directed by Daniel Mann

- Theatrical release poster by Michel Landi
- Directed by: Daniel Mann
- Written by: John Michael Hayes
- Story by: Lawrence Durrell
- Produced by: Kurt Unger
- Starring: Sophia Loren; Peter Finch; Jack Hawkins
- Cinematography: John Wilcox
- Edited by: Peter Taylor
- Music by: Sol Kaplan
- Distributed by: Paramount Pictures
- Release date: 20 January 1966 (US)
- Running time: 109 minutes
- Countries: Israel; United Kingdom; United States
- Language: English

Judith is a 1966 drama film directed by Daniel Mann from a screenplay by John Michael Hayes, based on a story by Lawrence Durrell. An international co-production of Israel, the United Kingdom and the United States, the film stars Sophia Loren, Peter Finch and Jack Hawkins. The music score was composed by Sol Kaplan, and John Wilcox served as the film's cinematographer.

Judith received a theatrical release in the US on 20 January 1966 by Paramount Pictures.

== Plot ==
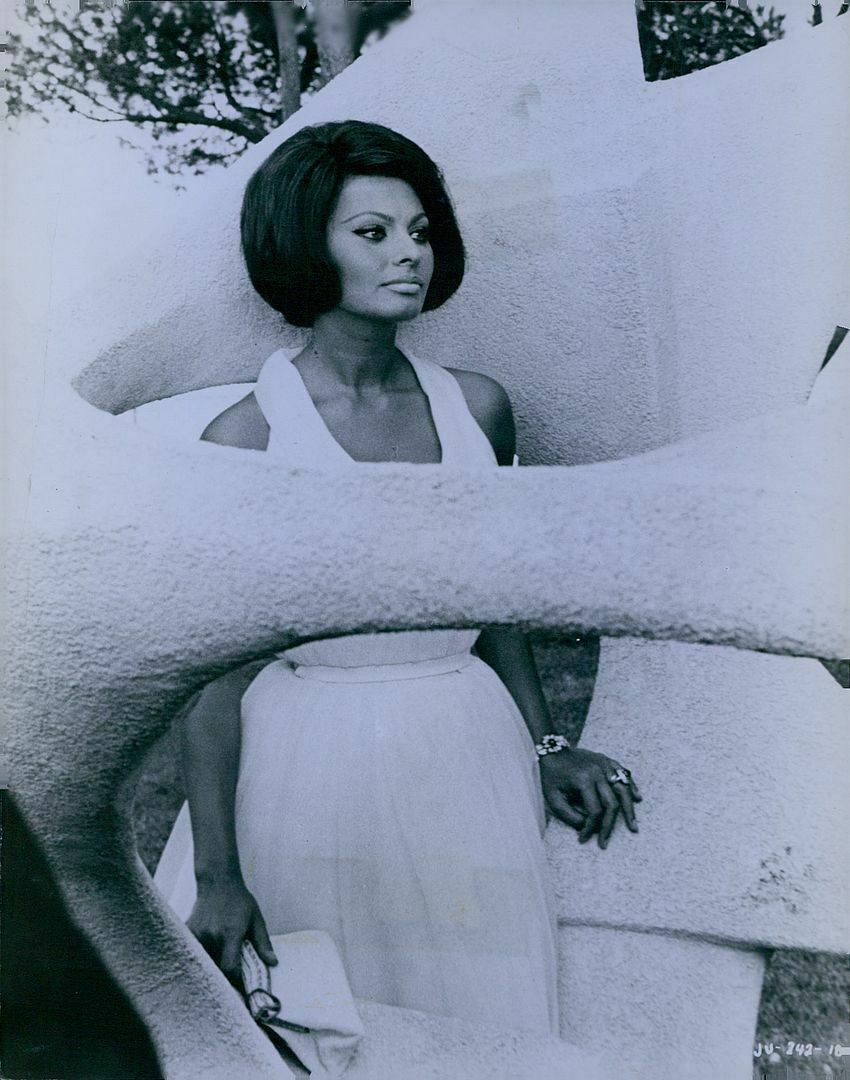
Loren in a publicity photo for the movie

In Palestine shortly before the end of the British mandate, the Haganah has learned that a former German tank commander, General Gustav Schiller, is teaching the Arabs battle tactics, but they are unable to locate him. Then they learn of the existence of his Jewish former wife, Judith Auerbach Schiller, and arrange for her to be smuggled into Palestine via the port of Haifa. She is placed in the care of Aaron Stein, a Haganah commander, at a kibbutz.

Schiller had abandoned his wife during the war and took away their son. Judith was then sent to the Dachau concentration camp, where she was forced to serve in an officers' brothel, but survived.

Judith dislikes the rigours of kibbutz life, and is unable to tell the kibbutz leaders anything about Schiller, but Stein hopes that she can at least identify him. He "suggests" that she ask the local army commander, Major Lawton, to help her. Judith travels to Haifa to see him and pleads with him to hand over the file on Schiller, which he eventually does. It turns out that Schiller was last known to be in Damascus, Syria.

Judith, Stein and a colleague are smuggled into Damascus, and after days of searching, they find Schiller. As they are about to capture him, Judith shoots and wounds him. Schiller is smuggled back to Palestine and interrogated, but he refuses to give any information. Left alone with Judith, he pleads for mercy. But as the kibbutz comes under attack by Arab forces, he finally reveals the battle plans, and also tells Judith that he knows the whereabouts of their son, Karl. The room in which he is being kept is bombed and Schiller is killed. Aaron promises that he will help Judith find her son.

== Cast ==
- Sophia Loren as Judith Auerbach
- Peter Finch as Aaron Stein
- Jack Hawkins as Major Lawton
- Hans Verner as Gustav Schiller
- Frank Wolff as Eli
- Shraga Friedman as Nathan
- André Morell as Haim
- Zaharira Harifai as Dr. Rachel
- Arnoldo Foà as Interrogator
- Joseph Gross as Yanek
- Roger Beaumont as Ze'ev
- Zipora Peled as Hannah
- Peter Burton as Conklin
- Terence Alexander as Carstairs
- Daniel Ocko as Arab Guide

== Production ==
John Michael Hayes recalled "They had another writer on the project to begin with, and they were on location for months trying to shoot scenes. Danny Mann, for whom I'd done Butterfield Eight, persuaded me to come over and do a rewrite, which I did in eighteen days. They started shooting when I was on page 21, hoping it would come out all right. There was a lot of conflict over the film. It went way over budget. Sophia Loren was getting a million dollars to play the part."

== Release ==
The film premiered on 20 January 1966 at Radio City Music Hall.

=== Reception ===
New York Times film critic Bosley Crowther, wrote that the film "... comes out as a disappointing picture, more lurid and loud than lustrous," and that the film is more fiction than an illusion. However, he praised Loren's acting: "She is lending her name and her presence to a routine cloak-and-dagger film that, without her, would get no more attention—and would deserve no more—than a quickie on the lower half of a double bill."

The film has a 20% "fresh" rating on Rotten Tomatoes, based on five reviews.
