= The Toff on the Farm =

1958 novel by John Creasey

- First edition
- Author: John Creasey
- Language: English
- Series: The Toff novels
- Genre: Mystery
- Publisher: Hodder & Stoughton
- Publication date: 1958
- Publication place: United Kingdom
- Pages: 192 (paperback edition)
- ISBN: 0-340-12934-4 (1969 edition)
- Preceded by: The Toff and the Stolen Tresses
- Followed by: Double for the Toff

The Toff on the Farm is a 1958 mystery novel by John Creasey featuring his character the Honourable Richard Rollison, aka 'The Toff'.

== Plot ==
Monty Morne, an old friend of Richard Rollison, tries to persuade The Toff to buy a farm from some friends of his, brother and sister Alan and Gillian Selby. But on arriving at Selby Farm, they discover that Alan Selby has been kidnapped and Gillian has been made offers for the farm that are much more than it is worth.

Rollison is drawn into the mystery when one of the bidders and his accomplice are found murdered, with the other bidder, William 'Tex' Brandt, suspected of the crimes.

The Toff has to discover the secret of Selby Farm and why rival bidders are seemingly prepared to kill for it, despite the presence of a sitting tenant who refuses to leave.

== Adaptations ==
In 1977, BBC Radio broadcast an adaptation of the novel in six parts, with Terence Alexander as The Toff. The serial has been re-broadcast on BBC Radio 7. It was broadcast again on R4 extra in June 2012, December 2013, June 2020, January 2022, and February 2024.
