= Gideon's Day =

1955 novel by John Creasey

- First edition (UK)
- Author: John Creasey (as J.J. Marric)
- Genre: Detective fiction
- Publisher: Hodder & Stoughton (UK); Harper & Brothers (US)
- Publication date: 1955
- Media type: Print
- Pages: 192
- OCLC: 1303053
- Followed by: Gideon's Week

Gideon's Day is the first in a series of police procedural novels by John Creasey writing as J.J. Marric. Published in 1955, it features a day in the professional life of Detective Superintendent George Gideon of the C.I.D., Scotland Yard. In later books in the series, Gideon has been promoted to the rank of C.I.D. Commander.

== Plot summary ==
Gideon's Day follows senior Superintendent George ‘Gee-Gee’ Gideon of Scotland Yard through one day of his 20-year career, during which a dozen different problems beset him and his men at Scotland Yard. C.I.D. Superintendent George Gideon is furious when he finds out that one of his detectives has accepted bribes. The consequences of confronting him spin out through the day. Other cases that Gideon deals with during the day include hunting for a child's killer and a jewel thief, solving a series of mail van robberies, and trying to find out who killed an old woman in a sweet-shop.

== Adaptations ==
The movie of the same name, directed by John Ford and starring Jack Hawkins as Gideon, is a comedy-melodrama, loosely adapted from the book.

== See also ==
- Gideon's Day (film), the film adaptation by John Ford
