= The Toff Goes to Market =

1942 crime thriller novel

- 1947 edition
- Author: John Creasey
- Language: English
- Series: The Toff
- Genre: Crime Thriller
- Publisher: John Long Ltd
- Publication date: 1942
- Publication place: United Kingdom
- Media type: Print
- Preceded by: Salute the Toff
- Followed by: The Toff Is Back

The Toff Goes to Market is a 1942 crime thriller novel by the British writer John Creasey. It was the eighth in his long-running featuring the gentleman amateur detective The Toff. It was one of a number of novels produced in the era that featured the booming wartime black market as a major plotline. It has been republished on a number of occasions.

== Bibliography ==
- Reilly, John M. Twentieth Century Crime & Mystery Writers. Springer, 2015.
- Roodhouse, Mark. Black Market Britain: 1939-1955. OUP Oxford, 2013.
