= The Toff =

- First appearance: The Black Circle (1933)
- Last appearance: The Toff and the Dead Man's Finger (1978) by William Vivian Butler
- Created by: John Creasey
- Portrayed by: John Bentley (film); Robert Burnard (radio); Terence Alexander (radio); Michael Johnson (theatre)

In-universe information
- Full name: Richard Rollison
- Alias: Bernard Brown
- Nicknames: The Toff; Rolly; Mr. Ar
- Gender: Male
- Occupation: Aristocrat; Amateur sleuth
- Origin: Cambridge
- Nationality: British
- Home: 22 Gresham Terrace

In the series of adventure novels by John Creasey, the Toff is the nickname of the Honourable Richard Rollison, an upper-class crime sleuth. Creasey published almost 60 Toff adventures, beginning with Introducing the Toff in 1938 and continuing through The Toff and the Crooked Copper, published in 1977, four years after the author's death.

Rollison's calling card includes a caricature of a toff—a line drawing with a top hat, monocle, bow-tie and cigarette with a holder. His flat includes a trophy wall, on which is a memento of every case Rollison helped to solve.

In these stories Rollison is moderately well-known, as his exploits are frequently reported in the newspapers. He is as at home in the East End of London as he is in upper-crust society circles.

== Bibliography ==
The Toff was introduced in the tuppenny weekly crime magazine The Thriller in 1933, while the first novel was published in 1938.

=== Magazines ===
- The Black Circle, The Thriller, 2 Dec 1933
- Murder of a Tramp, The Thriller, 13 Jul 1935
- The Man Who Knew, The Thriller, 6 Mar 1937
- The Toff and the Terrified Lady, The Creasey Mystery Magazine, Aug 1956
- Death to Joy, The Creasey Mystery Magazine, Sep 1956
- The Toff Beside the Sea, The Creasey Mystery Magazine, Feb 1957
- The Toff Takes Shares, John Creasey Mystery Magazine, Oct 1958
- The Love Racket, Mike Shayne Mystery Magazine, May 1959
- "Hate for the Toff", Mike Shayne Mystery Magazine, Oct 1959
- The Toff and the Unknown Victim, Mike Shayne Mystery Magazine, Nov 1959
- "Death Beneath the Apple Tree", John Creasey Mystery Magazine, Apr 1960
- "The Toff and the Watching Eyes", John Creasey Mystery Magazine, Jan 1962
- "Race to Death", John Creasey Mystery Magazine, Mar 1962
- The Toff and the Killer, John Creasey Mystery Magazine, Apr 1962
- "The Mark of the Thief", John Creasey Mystery Magazine, Dec 1963

=== Books ===
1. Introducing the Toff (1938)
2. The Toff Steps Out (1939)
3. The Toff Goes On (1939)
4. Here Comes the Toff (1940)
5. The Toff Breaks In (1940)
6. Salute the Toff (1941)
7. The Toff Proceeds (1941)
8. The Toff Goes to Market (1942)
9. The Toff Is Back (1942)
10. The Toff Among Millions (1943)
11. Accuse the Toff (1943)
12. The Toff and the Curate (1944) a.k.a. The Toff and the Deadly Parson
13. The Toff and the Great Illusion (1944)
14. Feathers for the Toff (1945)
15. The Cinema Crimes (1945)
16. The Toff and the Lady (1946)
17. The Toff on Ice (1946) a.k.a. Poison for The Toff
18. Hammer the Toff (1947)
19. The Toff in Town (1947)
20. The Toff Takes Shares (1948)
21. The Toff and Old Harry (1949)
22. The Toff on Board (1949)
23. Fool the Toff (1950)
24. Kill the Toff (1950)
25. A Knife for the Toff (1951)
26. The Toff Goes Gay (1951) a.k.a. A Mask for the Toff
27. Hunt the Toff (1952)
28. Call the Toff (1953)
29. The Toff Down Under (1953) a.k.a. Break the Toff
30. Murder Out of the Past (1953)
31. The Toff at Butlin's (1954)
32. The Toff at the Fair (1954) a.k.a. Last Laugh For The Toff
33. A Six for the Toff (1955) a.k.a. A Score for the Toff
34. The Toff and the Deep Blue Sea (1955)
35. Make-Up for the Toff (1956) a.k.a. Kiss the Toff
36. The Toff in New York (1956)
37. Model for the Toff (1957)
38. The Toff on Fire (1957)
39. The Toff and the Stolen Tresses (1958)
40. The Toff on the Farm (1958) a.k.a. Terror for the Toff
41. Double for the Toff (1959)
42. The Toff and the Runaway Bride (1959)
43. A Rocket for the Toff (1960)
44. The Toff and the Kidnapped Child (1960) a.k.a. The Kidnapped Child
45. Follow the Toff (1961)
46. The Toff and the Teds (1961) a.k.a. The Toff and the Toughs
47. A Doll for the Toff (1959)
48. Leave It to the Toff (1962)
49. The Toff and the Spider (1965)
50. The Toff in Wax (1966)
51. A Bundle for the Toff (1967)
52. Stars for the Toff (1968)
53. The Toff and the Golden Boy (1969)
54. The Toff and the Fallen Angels (1970)
55. Vote for the Toff (1971)
56. The Toff and the Trip-Trip-Triplets (1972)
57. The Toff and the Terrified Taxman (1973)
58. The Toff and the Sleepy Cowboy (1974)
59. The Toff and the Crooked Copper (1977)

After Creasey's death, William Vivian Butler wrote The Toff and the Dead Man's Finger (1978).

=== Play ===
In 1961, Creasey wrote a play titled The Toff for the Salisbury Arts Theatre.

== Characters ==
=== Richard Rollison ===
The Toff is a wealthy bachelor living in a Mayfair flat at 22 Gresham Terrace. Although the settings of the stories keep up with the times, Rollison himself maintains an age of roughly 40 throughout. He is over six feet tall, with dark hair. Rollison's friends refer to him as Rolly, and acquaintances from the East End refer to him as "Mr. R".

=== Jolly ===
Jolly is Rollison's valet, as well as a partner is his investigations. He is dour, and is in every way the proper gentleman's gentleman.

=== Superintendent William "Bill" Grice ===
Superintendent Bill Grice of Scotland Yard respects Rollison's abilities and contributions, but complains about his methods. Grice bears a scar on his face from a case in which Rollison was involved.

=== Richard Shuttleworth ===
Shuttleworth owns the stables at the end of Shoreditch Lane and often acts as Rollison's apprentice.

=== William "Bill" Ebbut ===
Bill Ebbut is the proprietor of the Blue Dog Gymnasium, in which he trains fighters, and The Sailor's Arms public house. Ebbut frequently provides trustworthy men to act as guards or trail suspects. He has: "...a big head, pendulous jowls, no neck to speak of, and a huge chest merging into a mammoth waist-line. All the time he breathed, he wheezed."

=== Lady Gloria Hurst ===
Rollison's aunt. Her home is the Marigold Club, where she takes in women requiring temporary assistance. She occasionally protects women involved in Rollison's adventures.

== Adaptations ==
=== Film ===
Two Maclean Rogers films were made from Toff adventures in 1952: Salute the Toff and Hammer the Toff. The Toff was played by John Bentley in both films.

=== Radio ===
At least six early novels, namely Introducing the Toff, The Toff Steps Out, Here Comes the Toff, Salute the Toff, The Toff Proceeds, and The Toff Is Back, were adapted into a serial by Australia's Crawford Productions in the late 1940s. Robert Burnard starred as the Toff. Hundreds of episodes are kept in Australia's National Film and Sound Archive.

Two other novels, The Toff and the Runaway Bride and The Toff on the Farm, were adapted into BBC Radio dramas starring Terence Alexander, in 1975 and 1977 respectively.

=== Theatre ===
The 1961 production The Toff by Salisbury Arts Theatre Limited, which debuted on 17 April 1961 at Salisbury Playhouse, starred Michael Johnson as the Toff.

=== Comics ===
A couple Super Detective Library comic books published by Amalgamated Press were adapted from Toff novels: The Toff at Butlin's (#61) and The Missing Millionaire (#110, based on A Six for the Toff).
