= John Creasey =

English writer (1908–1973)

John Creasey MBE
- Born: 17 September 1908; Southfields, London Borough of Wandsworth, England
- Died: 9 June 1973 (aged 64); Salisbury, Wiltshire, England
- Occupation: Writer
- Writing career
- Pen name: see list here
- Genres: Crime fiction, Science fiction, Westerns, Romantic novels
- Notable works: The Toff series George Gideon series (as J.J. Marric); Inspector Roger West series The Baron series (as Anthony Morton); Doctor Emmanuel Cellini series Dr. Palfrey series

John Creasey MBE (17 September 1908 – 9 June 1973) was an English author known mostly for detective and crime novels but who also wrote science fiction, romance and westerns. He wrote more than six hundred novels using twenty-eight different pseudonyms.

He created several ongoing characters, such as The Toff (The Honourable Richard Rollison), Commander George Gideon of Scotland Yard (starting with Gideon's Day in 1955), Inspector Roger West, The Baron (John Mannering), Doctor Emmanuel Cellini, and Doctor Stanislaus Alexander Palfrey. Gideon of Scotland Yard was the basis for the John Ford movie Gideon's Day (1958) and for the television series Gideon's Way (1964–66). The Baron character was made into a TV series starring Steve Forrest as The Baron (1966–67).

== Life and career ==
John Creasey was born in Southfields, London Borough of Wandsworth (formerly part of Surrey), to a working-class family. He was the seventh of nine children of Ruth and Joseph Creasey, a poor coach maker. Creasey was educated at Fulham Elementary School and Sloane School, both in London. From 1923 to 1935 he worked various clerical, factory, and sales jobs while trying to establish himself as a writer. After a number of rejections, Creasey's first book was published in 1930. His first crime novel, Seven Times Seven, about a gang of criminals, was published in January 1932 by Melrose. In 1935 he became a full-time writer. In 1937 alone, twenty-nine of his books were published. A phenomenally fast writer, he once suggested that he could be shut up in a glass-box and write there a whole book.

In 1938, he created the character The Toff with the first novel Introducing the Toff. The Toff series would continue for 59 novels from 1938 to 1978. The Toff, The Honourable Richard Rollison, is an aristocrat and an amateur sleuth. ("Toff" is a British slang expression for an aristocrat.)

During World War II, he created the character of Dr. Stanislaus Alexander Palfrey, a British secret service agent, who forms Z5, a secret underground group that owes its allegiance to the Allies. The first novel of the Dr. Palfrey 34-book series was Traitor's Doom, published in 1942 by John Long Ltd., while the last was The Whirlwind in 1979.

In 1962, Creasey won an Edgar Award for Best Novel, from the Mystery Writers of America (MWA), for Gideon's Fire, written under the pseudonym J. J. Marric. In 1969 he received the MWA's greatest honour, the Grand Master Award. He served one term as president of the organization in 1966, one of only three non-American writers to be so honoured.

Creasey had as many publishers as he had pseudonyms, but enjoyed enduring relations with John Long and Hodder & Stoughton in the UK. After he finally broke into the American market in the 1950s, many of his books were released by Harper and Scribners; Walker reissued many older titles in revised editions.

During the 1940s, Creasey was living at "Cattistock", Fernlea Avenue, Ferndown, Wimborne in Dorset. He died at his home New Hall, which is now New Hall Hospital, Bodenham near Salisbury, Wiltshire in 1973.

In March 2007, his family sold all of Creasey's copyrights to Fleming Literary Management.

=== Adaptations ===
- Several adaptations were made of Creasey's novels. On film these included: Salute the Toff (1952, also known as Brighthaven Express in the USA), Hammer the Toff (1952), John Ford's Gideon's Day (1958, also known as Gideon of Scotland Yard in the USA), released by Columbia Pictures, and Cat & Mouse (1958, also known as The Desperate Men in the USA), written as Michael Halliday.
- On television, a series based on the Commander George Gideon character, Gideon's Way, was produced from 1964 to 1965 by ITC Entertainment and starring John Gregson in the title rôle. ITC followed this with a version of Creasey's The Baron character (1965–66), starring Steve Forrest.
- Between 1967 and 1971 the BBC produced a radio version of Creasey's Roger West stories with actor Patrick Allen in the title role as Scotland Yard Chief Inspector Roger "Handsome" West, with Allen's real-life wife Sarah Lawson playing the role of West's wife Janet. The Toff was also portrayed on Australian and BBC radio.

==== BBC Radio Adaptations ====
Story Title	Episode Name	Broadcast Date	Broadcast Station
Battle For Inspector West	Honeymoon spells Nightmare	04.05.1967	BBC Light Programme
	Terror for a Bride	11.05.1967	BBC Light Programme
	Shadow on a Millionaire	18.05.1967	BBC Light Programme
	Bait for a Bogey	25.05.1967	BBC Light Programme
	Trail from a Tip-off	01.06.1967	BBC Light Programme
	Explosion in Red	08.06.1967	BBC Light Programme
	Master-mind at Midnight	15.06.1967	BBC Light Programme
Inspector West At Home	The Voice of Doom	25.03.1968	BBC Radio 2
	Crisis for a Copper	28.03.1968	BBC Radio 2
	Fear in Flat Nine	01.04.1968	BBC Radio 2
	A Call from the Whistler	04.04.1968	BBC Radio 2
	A Girl for a Hostage	08.04.1968	BBC Radio 2
	Clue from a Captive	11.04.1968	BBC Radio 2
	A Date with Justice	15.04.1968	BBC Radio 2
Inspector West At Bay	Flashpoint in Fleet Street	27.05.1969	BBC Radio 2
	Bombshell in Bournemouth	29.05.1969	BBC Radio 2
	Encounter with an Eve	03.06.1969	BBC Radio 2
	Conflict in Kensington	05.06.1969	BBC Radio 2
	Package for Peril	10.06.1969	BBC Radio 2
	Shadow of Darkness	12.06.1969	BBC Radio 2
	Bullets in Bell Street	17.06.1969	BBC Radio 2
	Finale for a Vendetta	19.06.1969	BBC Radio 2
A Beauty for Inspector West	Death Calls for a Queen	13.07.1970	BBC Radio 4
	Killer - With a Question Mark	20.07.1970	BBC Radio 4
	Heat Seven - Hammersmith	27.07.1970	BBC Radio 4
	Beauty Beware!	03.08.1970	BBC Radio 4
	Murder, Sweet Murder	10.08.1970	BBC Radio 4
	Fire in the Night	17.08.1970	BBC Radio 4
	Murder Wears a Veil	24.08.1970	BBC Radio 4
Inspector West Cries Wolf	The Mark of the Wolf	31.08.1970	BBC Radio 4
	Knife In the Dark	07.09.1970	BBC Radio 4
	Murder at Morden Lodge	14.09.1970	BBC Radio 4
	Captive at Cannon Row	21.09.1970	BBC Radio 4
	Hunt the Wolf	28.09.1970	BBC Radio 4
	The Face of Lobo	05.10.1970	BBC Radio 4
Inspector West Makes Haste	Old Coppers Never Die	28.08.1971	BBC Radio 4
	Murder Steps In	04.09.1971	BBC Radio 4
	A Clue from the Past	11.09.1971	BBC Radio 4
	Appointment by Night	18.09.1971	BBC Radio 4
	Someone Missing	25.09.1971	BBC Radio 4
	The Race is Run	02.10.1971	BBC Radio 4

== Crime Writers' Association (CWA) ==
In 1953, John Creasey founded the Crime Writers' Association (CWA) in the UK. The CWA New Blood Dagger is awarded in his memory, for first books by previously unpublished writers; sponsored by BBC Audiobooks, it includes a prize of £1000. This award was known previously as the John Creasey Memorial Dagger.

== Pseudonyms ==
His pseudonyms include:

- Gordon Ashe
- Henry St. John Cooper
- Credo
- Norman Deane
- Robert Caine Frazer
- Patrick Gill
- Michael Halliday
- Charles Hogarth (with Ian Bowen)
- Brian Hope
- Colin Hughes
- Kyle Hunt
- Abel Mann
- Peter Manton
- J.J. Marric
- James Marsden
- Richard Martin
- Rodney Mattheson
- Anthony Morton
- Henry St. John
- Martin Richard
- Jeremy York

In addition, he wrote Westerns under the names of Ken Ranger, Tex Riley, William K. Reilly, and Jimmy Wilde. He also wrote Romantic novels under the names of Margaret Cooke, M.E. Cooke, and Elise Fecamps.

== Political career ==
Creasey was a longtime committed Liberal party member though he later became an independent. He said that he had been organising Liberal street-corner meetings from the age of 12. At the time of the 1945 general election Creasey was Chairman of the local Liberal Association in Bournemouth where his publicity and writing skills were instrumental in helping the Liberals to an atypical second place. He was adopted as prospective parliamentary candidate for Bournemouth West in 1946 and appeared on the platform at the 1947 Liberal Assembly, which was held in Bournemouth.

He fought Bournemouth West in the 1950 general election, coming third. He became increasingly unhappy with the party through the 1950s though and disagreed so much with the party's policy concerning the Suez Crisis he resigned his membership. However, after the Orpington by-election success of 1962 and impressed with Jo Grimond's leadership of the party he seemed to be reviving his Liberal activity. By January 1966 however, he had founded the All Party Alliance, a pressure group which sought to unite the best people from all parties.

The platform of the All Party Alliance was based on running industry by councils made up of workers, managers, investors and government to avoid industrial action, with a mind to eventually eliminate income tax.

Creasey fought by-elections as an independent in support of this idea around 1967 at Nuneaton, Brierley Hill and Manchester Gorton. He also fought Oldham West during the by-election of June 1968. He did well for an independent with the first-past-the-post system, having limited resources and often little time to campaign.

In Oldham West he beat his old party's candidate into fourth place. He could not seem to shed his affection for the Liberal party however, congratulating Birmingham Ladywood by-election victor Wallace Lawler in July 1969 and attending the 1969 party assembly albeit to promote All Party Alliance aims.

In 1972 he relaunched the All Party Alliance as Evolution to Democracy (Evo). Evo merged with Colin Campion's "The Organisation", a Yorkshire-based party which advocated coalition governments based on the proportion of votes cast for each party, to form the "Independent Democratic Alliance", which soon faded after Creasey's death, and its poor performance in the February 1974 general election.

John Creasey features in the Look At Life film I Protest! where he is seen collecting signatures for a petition to lobby the government to take action against the number of deaths due to road accidents.

== Honours ==
Creasey was awarded the Member of the Order of the British Empire (MBE) for services in the United Kingdom's National Savings Movement during World War II.

== Museum ==
The Young Gallery in Salisbury holds a collection of books, personal effects, and objects relating to John Creasey as part of its collection. This was previously known as the John Creasey Museum, but now comes under the Young & Creasey Gallery Trust.

== Published works ==
code	series	titles
GG	The Commander George Gideon series	28
Z5	Dr. Palfrey (Z5) series	39
DZ	The Department Z series	28
RW	Chief Inspector Roger West series	68
TT	The Toff series	80
SB	Sexton Blake series	4
Ba	The Baron series	62
BM	The Bruce Murdoch series	6
Li	The Liberator series	3
MK	The Mark Kilby series	8
SF	The Superintendent Folly series	12
FB	The Fane Brothers series	8
DC	The Doctor Cellini series	22
PD	The Patrick Dawlish Series	54

Genres: RO for romance, WE for westerns, MY for mystery, na for no idea. Reprint, sometimes under another name.

genre	credits	ser.	title	year	comments
MY	J. J. Marric	GG	Gideon's Day	1955
MY	J. J. Marric	GG	Gideon of Scotland Yard	-	reprint of Gideon's Day
MY	J. J. Marric	GG	Gideon's Week	1956
MY	J. J. Marric	GG	7 Days to Death	-	reprint of Gideon's Week
MY	J. J. Marric	GG	Gideon's Night	1957
MY	J. J. Marric	GG	Gideon's Month	1958
MY	J. J. Marric	GG	Gideon's Staff	1959
MY	J. J. Marric	GG	Gideon's Risk	1960
MY	J. J. Marric	GG	Gideon's Fire	1961
MY	J. J. Marric	GG	Gideon's March	1962
MY	J. J. Marric	GG	Gideon's Ride	1963
MY	J. J. Marric	GG	Gideon's Vote	1964
MY	J. J. Marric	GG	Gideon's Lot	1965
MY	J. J. Marric	GG	Gideon's Badge	1966
MY	J. J. Marric	GG	Gideon's Wrath	1967
MY	J. J. Marric	GG	Gideon's River	1968
MY	J. J. Marric	GG	Gideon's Power	1969
MY	J. J. Marric	GG	Gideon's Sport	1970
MY	J. J. Marric	GG	Gideon's Art	1971
MY	J. J. Marric	GG	Gideon's Men	1972
MY	J. J. Marric	GG	Gideon's Press	1973
MY	J. J. Marric	GG	Gideon's Fog	1975
MY	J. J. Marric	GG	Gideon's Drive	1976
MY	J. J. Marric	GG	Gideon's Force	1978	written by William Vivian Butler
MY	J. J. Marric	GG	Gideon's Law	1981	written by William Vivian Butler
MY	J. J. Marric	GG	Gideon's Way	1983	written by William Vivian Butler
MY	J. J. Marric	GG	Gideon's Raid	1986	written by William Vivian Butler
MY	J. J. Marric	GG	Gideon's Fear	1990	written by William Vivian Butler
na	John Creasey	Z5	Traitor's Doom	1942 Nov.
na	John Creasey	Z5	The Valley of Fear	1943 May
na	John Creasey	Z5	The Perilous Country	-	reprint of The Valley of Fear
na	John Creasey	Z5	The Legion of the Lost	1943 Nov.
na	John Creasey	Z5	Dangerous Quest	1944
na	John Creasey	Z5	Death in the Rising Sun	1945
na	John Creasey	Z5	The Hounds of Vengeance	1945
na	John Creasey	Z5	Shadow of Doom	1946
na	John Creasey	Z5	The House of the Bears	1946
na	John Creasey	Z5	Dark Harvest	1947
na	John Creasey	Z5	The Wings of Peace	1948
na	John Creasey	Z5	The Sons of Satan	1948
na	John Creasey	Z5	The Dawn of Darkness	1949
na	John Creasey	Z5	The League of Light	1949
na	John Creasey	Z5	The Man Who Shook the World	1950
na	John Creasey	Z5	The Prophet of Fire	1951
na	John Creasey	Z5	The Children of Hate	1952
na	John Creasey	Z5	The Killers of Innocence	-	reprint of The Children of Hate
na	John Creasey	Z5	The Touch of Death	1954
na	John Creasey	Z5	The Mists of Fear	1955
na	John Creasey	Z5	The Flood	1956
na	John Creasey	Z5	The Plague of Silence	1958
na	John Creasey	Z5	The Drought	1959
na	John Creasey	Z5	Dry Spell	-	reprint of The Drought
na	John Creasey	Z5	The Terror	1962
na	John Creasey	Z5	The Depths	1963
na	John Creasey	Z5	The Sleep	1964
na	John Creasey	Z5	The Inferno	1965
na	John Creasey	Z5	The Famine	1967
na	John Creasey	Z5	The Blight	1968
na	John Creasey	Z5	The Oasis	1969
na	John Creasey	Z5	The Smog	1970
na	John Creasey	Z5	The Unbegotten	1971
na	John Creasey	Z5	The Insulators	1972
na	John Creasey	Z5	The Voiceless Ones	1973
na	John Creasey	Z5	The Thunder-Maker	1976
na	John Creasey	Z5	The Whirlwind	1979
last two books written by Richard Creasey; the central figure is Thomas Palfrey, the doctor's grandson
na	John Creasey	Z5	Eternity's Sunrise	2012
na	John Creasey	Z5	Hard Targets	2013	omnibus: Wings of Fear, Burning Night and Deadly Sleep
MY	John Creasey	DZ	The Death Miser	1933
MY	John Creasey	DZ	Redhead	1933
MY	John Creasey	DZ	First Came a Murder	1934
MY	John Creasey	DZ	Death 'Round the Corner	1935
MY	John Creasey	DZ	The Mark of the Crescent	1935
MY	John Creasey	DZ	Thunder in Europe	1936
MY	John Creasey	DZ	The Terror Trap	1936
MY	John Creasey	DZ	Carriers of Death	1937
MY	John Creasey	DZ	Days of Danger	1937
MY	John Creasey	DZ	Death Stands By	1938
MY	John Creasey	DZ	Menace!	1938
MY	John Creasey	DZ	Murder Must Wait	1939
MY	John Creasey	DZ	Panic!	1939
MY	John Creasey	DZ	Death by Night	1940
MY	John Creasey	DZ	The Island of Peril	1940
MY	John Creasey	DZ	Sabotage	1941
MY	John Creasey	DZ	Go Away Death	1941
MY	John Creasey	DZ	The Day of Disaster	1942
MY	John Creasey	DZ	Prepare for Action	1942
MY	John Creasey	DZ	No Darker Crime	1943
MY	John Creasey	DZ	Dark Peril	1944
MY	John Creasey	DZ	The Peril Ahead	1946
MY	John Creasey	DZ	The League of Dark Men	1947
MY	John Creasey	DZ	The Department of Death	1949
MY	John Creasey	DZ	The Enemy Within	1950
MY	John Creasey	DZ	Dead or Alive	1951
MY	John Creasey	DZ	A Kind of Prisoner	1954
MY	John Creasey	DZ	The Black Spiders	1957
MY	John Creasey	RW	Inspector West Takes Charge	1942
MY	John Creasey	RW	Inspector West Leaves Town	1943
MY	John Creasey	RW	Go Away to Murder	-	reprint of Inspector West Leaves Town
MY	John Creasey	RW	Inspector West at Home	1944	adapted for BBC Radio starring Patrick Allen
MY	John Creasey	RW	Inspector West Regrets	1945
MY	John Creasey	RW	Holiday for Inspector West	1946
MY	John Creasey	RW	Battle for Inspector West	1948	adapted for BBC Radio starring Patrick Allen
MY	John Creasey	RW	Triumph for Inspector West	1948
MY	John Creasey	RW	The Case Against Paul Raeburn	-	reprint of Triumph for Inspector West
MY	John Creasey	RW	Inspector West Kicks Off	1949
MY	John Creasey	RW	Sport for inspector West	-	reprint of Inspector West Kicks Off
MY	John Creasey	RW	Inspector West Alone	1950
MY	John Creasey	RW	Inspector West Cries Wolf	1950	adapted for BBC Radio starring Patrick Allen
MY	John Creasey	RW	The Creepers	-	reprint of Inspector West Cries Wolf
MY	John Creasey	RW	A Case for Inspector West	1951
MY	John Creasey	RW	The Figure in the Dusk	-	reprint of A Case for Inspector West
MY	John Creasey	RW	Puzzle for Inspector West	1951
MY	John Creasey	RW	The Dissemblers	-	reprint of Puzzle for Inspector West
MY	John Creasey	RW	Inspector West at Bay	1952	adapted for BBC Radio starring Patrick Allen
MY	John Creasey	RW	The Blind Spot	-	reprint of Inspector West at Bay
MY	John Creasey	RW	The Case of the Acid Throwers	-	reprint of Inspector West at Bay
MY	John Creasey	RW	A Gun for Inspector West	1953
MY	John Creasey	RW	Give a Man a Gun	-	reprint of A Gun for Inspector West
MY	John Creasey	RW	Send Inspector West	1953
MY	John Creasey	RW	Send Superintendent West	-	slightly rewritten Send Inspector West
MY	John Creasey	RW	A Beauty for Inspector West	1954	adapted for BBC Radio starring Patrick Allen
MY	John Creasey	RW	The Beauty Queen Killer	-	reprint of A Beauty for Inspector West
MY	John Creasey	RW	So Young, So Cold, So Fair	-	reprint of A Beauty for Inspector West
MY	John Creasey	RW	Inspector West Makes Haste	1955	adapted for BBC Radio starring Patrick Allen
MY	John Creasey	RW	Murder Makes Haste	-	reprint of Inspector West Makes Haste
MY	John Creasey	RW	The Gelignite Gang	-	reprint of Inspector West Makes Haste
MY	John Creasey	RW	Night of the Watchman	-	reprint of Inspector West Makes Haste
MY	John Creasey	RW	Two for Inspector West	1955
MY	John Creasey	RW	Murder: One, Two, Three	-	reprint of Two for Inspector West
MY	John Creasey	RW	Murder Tips the Scales	-	reprint of Two for Inspector West
MY	John Creasey	RW	Parcels for Inspector West	1956
MY	John Creasey	RW	Death of a Postman	-	reprint of Parcels for Inspector West
MY	John Creasey	RW	A Prince for Inspector West	1956
MY	John Creasey	RW	Death of an Assassin	-	reprint of A Prince for Inspector West
MY	John Creasey	RW	Accident for Inspector West	1957
MY	John Creasey	RW	Hit and Run	-	reprint of Accident for Inspector West
MY	John Creasey	RW	Find Inspector West	1957
MY	John Creasey	RW	The Trouble at Saxby's	-	reprint of Find Inspector West
MY	John Creasey	RW	Doorway to Death	-	reprint of Find Inspector West
MY	John Creasey	RW	Murder, London – New York	1958
MY	John Creasey	RW	Strike for Death	1958
MY	John Creasey	RW	The Killing Strike	-	reprint of Strike for Death
MY	John Creasey	RW	Death of a Racehorse	1959
MY	John Creasey	RW	The Case of the Innocent Victims	1959
MY	John Creasey	RW	Murder on the Line	1960
MY	John Creasey	RW	Death in Cold Print	1961
MY	John Creasey	RW	The Scene of the Crime	1961
MY	John Creasey	RW	Policeman's Dread	1962
MY	John Creasey	RW	Hang the Little Man	1963
MY	John Creasey	RW	Look Three Ways at Murder	1964
MY	John Creasey	RW	Murder, London – Australia	1965
MY	John Creasey	RW	Murder, London – South Africa	1966
MY	John Creasey	RW	The Executioners	1967
MY	John Creasey	RW	So Young to Burn	1968
MY	John Creasey	RW	Murder, London – Miami	1969
MY	John Creasey	RW	A Part for a Policeman	1970
MY	John Creasey	RW	Alibi	1971
MY	John Creasey	RW	Alibi for Inspector West	-	reprint of Alibi
MY	John Creasey	RW	A Splinter of Glass	1972
MY	John Creasey	RW	The Theft of Magna Carta	-
MY	John Creasey	RW	Theft of Magna Carta	-	reprint of The Theft of Magna Carta
MY	John Creasey	RW	The Extortioners	1974
MY	John Creasey	RW	A Sharp Rise in Crime	1978
MY	John Creasey	TT	Introducing the Toff	1938
MY	John Creasey	TT	The Toff Goes On	1939
MY	John Creasey	TT	The Toff Steps Out	1939
MY	John Creasey	TT	Here Comes the Toff	1940
MY	John Creasey	TT	The Toff Breaks In	1940
MY	John Creasey	TT	Salute the Toff	1941
MY	John Creasey	TT	The Toff Proceeds	1941
MY	John Creasey	TT	The Toff Goes to Market	1942
MY	John Creasey	TT	The Toff Is Back	1942
MY	John Creasey	TT	The Toff Among Millions	1943
MY	John Creasey	TT	Accuse the Toff	1943
MY	John Creasey	TT	The Toff and the Curate	1944
MY	John Creasey	TT	The Toff and the Deadly Parson	-	reprint of The Toff and the Curate
MY	John Creasey	TT	The Toff and the Great Illusion	1944
MY	John Creasey	TT	Feathers for the Toff	1945
MY	John Creasey	TT	The Cinema Crimes	1945
MY	John Creasey	TT	The Toff and the Lady	1946
MY	John Creasey	TT	The Toff on Ice	1946
MY	John Creasey	TT	Poison for The Toff	-	reprint of The Toff on Ice
MY	John Creasey	TT	Hammer the Toff	1947
MY	John Creasey	TT	The Toff in Town	1947
MY	John Creasey	TT	The Toff Takes Shares	1948
MY	John Creasey	TT	The Toff and Old Harry	1949
MY	John Creasey	TT	The Toff on Board	1949
MY	John Creasey	TT	Fool the Toff	1950
MY	John Creasey	TT	Kill the Toff	1950
MY	John Creasey	TT	A Knife for the Toff	1951
MY	John Creasey	TT	The Toff Goes Gay	1951
MY	John Creasey	TT	A Mask for the Toff	-	reprint of The Toff Goes Gay
MY	John Creasey	TT	Hunt the Toff	1952
MY	John Creasey	TT	Call the Toff	1953
MY	John Creasey	TT	The Toff Down Under	1953
MY	John Creasey	TT	Break the Toff	-	reprint of The Toff Down Under
MY	John Creasey	TT	Murder Out of the Past	1953
MY	John Creasey	TT	The Toff at Butlin's	1954
MY	John Creasey	TT	The Toff at the Fair	1954
MY	John Creasey	TT	Last Laugh For The Toff	-	reprint of The Toff at the Fair
MY	John Creasey	TT	A Six for the Toff	1955
MY	John Creasey	TT	A Score for the Toff	-	reprint of A Six for the Toff
MY	John Creasey	TT	The Toff and the Deep Blue Sea	1955
MY	John Creasey	TT	Make-Up for the Toff	1956
MY	John Creasey	TT	Kiss the Toff	-	reprint of Make-Up for the Toff
MY	John Creasey	TT	The Toff in New York	1956
MY	John Creasey	TT	Model for the Toff	1957
MY	John Creasey	TT	The Toff on Fire	1957
MY	John Creasey	TT	The Toff and the Stolen Tresses	1958
MY	John Creasey	TT	The Toff on the Farm	1958
MY	John Creasey	TT	Terror for the Toff	-	reprint of The Toff on the Farm
MY	John Creasey	TT	Double for the Toff	1959
MY	John Creasey	TT	The Toff and the Runaway Bride	1959
MY	John Creasey	TT	A Rocket for the Toff	1960
MY	John Creasey	TT	The Toff and the Kidnapped Child	1960
MY	John Creasey	TT	The Kidnapped Child	-	reprint of The Toff and the Kidnapped Child
MY	John Creasey	TT	Follow the Toff	1961
MY	John Creasey	TT	The Toff and the Teds	1961
MY	John Creasey	TT	The Toff and the Toughs	-	reprint of The Toff and the Teds
MY	John Creasey	TT	A Doll for the Toff	1959
MY	John Creasey	TT	Leave It to the Toff	1962
MY	John Creasey	TT	The Toff and the Spider	1965
MY	John Creasey	TT	The Toff in Wax	1966
MY	John Creasey	TT	A Bundle for the Toff	1967
MY	John Creasey	TT	Stars for the Toff	1968
MY	John Creasey	TT	The Toff and the Golden Boy	1969
MY	John Creasey	TT	The Toff and the Fallen Angels	1970
MY	John Creasey	TT	Vote for the Toff	1971
MY	John Creasey	TT	The Toff and the Trip-Trip-Triplets	1972
MY	John Creasey	TT	The Toff and the Terrified Taxman	1973
MY	John Creasey	TT	The Toff and the Sleepy Cowboy	1974
MY	John Creasey	TT	The Toff and the Crooked Copper	1977
MY	John Creasey	TT	The Toff and the Dead Man's Finger	1978	written by William Vivian Butler
MY	John Creasey	SB	The Case of the Murdered Financier	1937
MY	John Creasey	SB	The Great Air Swindle	1939
MY	John Creasey	SB	The Man from Fleet Street	1940
MY	John Creasey	SB	The Case of the Mad Inventor	1942
MY	John Creasey	SB	Private Carter's Crime	1943
MY	John Creasey		Seven Times Seven	1932
MY	John Creasey		Men, Maids and Murder	1933
MY	John Creasey		The Men Who Died Laughing	1935
MY	John Creasey		Yesterday's Murder	1945
MY	John Creasey		The Mountain of the Blind	1960
MY	John Creasey		The Foothills of Fear	1961
MY	John Creasey		The Masters of Bow Street	1972
WE	Anthony Morton	Ba	Meet the Baron	1937
WE	Anthony Morton	Ba	The Man in the Blue Mask	-	U.S. title for Meet the Baron
WE	Anthony Morton	Ba	The Baron Returns	1937
WE	Anthony Morton	Ba	The Return of Blue Mask	-	U.S. title for The Baron Returns
WE	Anthony Morton	Ba	The Baron Again	1938
WE	Anthony Morton	Ba	Salute Blue Mask	-	U.S. title for The Baron Again
WE	Anthony Morton	Ba	The Baron at Bay	1938
WE	Anthony Morton	Ba	Blue Mask at Bay	-	U.S. title for The Baron at Bay
WE	Anthony Morton	Ba	Alias the Baron	1939
WE	Anthony Morton	Ba	Alias Blue Mask	-	U.S. title for Alias the Baron
WE	Anthony Morton	Ba	The Baron at Large	1939
WE	Anthony Morton	Ba	Challenge Blue Mask	-	U.S. title for The Baron at Large
WE	Anthony Morton	Ba	Versus the Baron	1940
WE	Anthony Morton	Ba	Blue Mask Strikes Again	-	U.S. title for Versus the Baron
WE	Anthony Morton	Ba	Call for the Baron	1940
WE	Anthony Morton	Ba	Blue Mask Victorious	-	U.S. title for Call for the Baron
WE	Anthony Morton	Ba	The Baron Comes Back	1943
WE	Anthony Morton	Ba	A Case for the Baron	1945
WE	Anthony Morton	Ba	Reward for the Baron	1945
WE	Anthony Morton	Ba	Career for the Baron	1946
WE	Anthony Morton	Ba	The Baron and the Beggar	1947
WE	Anthony Morton	Ba	A Rope for the Baron	1948
WE	Anthony Morton	Ba	Blame the Baron	1948
WE	Anthony Morton	Ba	Books for the Baron	1949
WE	Anthony Morton	Ba	Cry for the Baron	1950
WE	Anthony Morton	Ba	Trap the Baron	1950
WE	Anthony Morton	Ba	Attack the Baron	1951
WE	Anthony Morton	Ba	Shadow the Baron	1951
WE	Anthony Morton	Ba	Warn the Baron	1952
WE	Anthony Morton	Ba	The Baron Goes East	1953
WE	Anthony Morton	Ba	The Baron in France	1953
WE	Anthony Morton	Ba	Danger for the Baron	1953
WE	Anthony Morton	Ba	The Baron Goes Fast	1954
WE	Anthony Morton	Ba	Nest-Egg for the Baron	1954
WE	Anthony Morton	Ba	Deaf, Dumb and Blonde	-	U.S. title for Nest-Egg for the Baron
WE	Anthony Morton	Ba	Help from the Baron	1955
WE	Anthony Morton	Ba	Hide the Baron	1956
WE	Anthony Morton	Ba	Frame the Baron	1957
WE	Anthony Morton	Ba	The Double Frame	-	U.S. title for Frame the Baron
WE	Anthony Morton	Ba	Red Eye for the Baron	1958
WE	Anthony Morton	Ba	Blood Red	-	U.S. title for Red Eye for the Baron
WE	Anthony Morton	Ba	Black for the Baron	1959
WE	Anthony Morton	Ba	If Anything Happens to Hester	-	U.S. title for Black for the Baron
WE	Anthony Morton	Ba	Salute for the Baron	1960
WE	Anthony Morton	Ba	A Branch for the Baron	1961
WE	Anthony Morton	Ba	The Baron Branches Out	-	U.S. title for A Branch for the Baron
WE	Anthony Morton	Ba	Bad for the Baron	1962
WE	Anthony Morton	Ba	The Baron and the Stolen Legacy	-	U.S. title for Bad for the Baron
WE	Anthony Morton	Ba	A Sword for the Baron	1963
WE	Anthony Morton	Ba	The Baron and the Mogul Swords	-	U.S. title for A Sword for the Baron
WE	Anthony Morton	Ba	The Baron on Board	1964
WE	Anthony Morton	Ba	The Baron and the Chinese Puzzle	1965
WE	Anthony Morton	Ba	Sport for the Baron	1966
WE	Anthony Morton	Ba	Affair for the Baron	1967
WE	Anthony Morton	Ba	The Baron and the Missing Old Masters	1968
WE	Anthony Morton	Ba	The Baron and the Unfinished Portrait	1969
WE	Anthony Morton	Ba	Last Laugh for the Baron	1970
WE	Anthony Morton	Ba	The Baron Goes A-Buying	1971
WE	Anthony Morton	Ba	The Baron and the Arrogant Artist	1972
WE	Anthony Morton	Ba	Burgle the Baron	1973
WE	Anthony Morton	Ba	The Baron, King-Maker	1975
WE	Anthony Morton	Ba	Love for the Baron	1979
MY	Norman Deane	BM	1. Secret Errand	1939
MY	Norman Deane	BM	2. Dangerous Journey	1939
MY	Norman Deane	BM	3. Unknown Mission	1940
MY	Norman Deane	BM	4. The Withered Man	1940
MY	Norman Deane	BM	5. I Am the Withered Man	1941
MY	Norman Deane	BM	6. Where is the Withered Man	1942
MY	Norman Deane	Li	1. Return to Adventure	1943
MY	Norman Deane	Li	2. Gateway to Escape	1944
MY	Norman Deane	Li	3. Come Home to Crime	1945
MY	Robert Caine Frazer	MK	1. Mark Kilby Solves a Murder	1959
MY	Robert Caine Frazer	MK	R.I.S.C.	-	reprint of Mark Kilby Solves a Murder
MY	Robert Caine Frazer	MK	The Timid Tycoon	-	reprint of Mark Kilby Solves a Murder
MY	Robert Caine Frazer	MK	2. Mark Kilby and the Secret Syndicate	1960
MY	Robert Caine Frazer	MK	3. Mark Kilby and the Miami Mob	1960
MY	Robert Caine Frazer	MK	4. Mark Kilby Stands Alone	1962
MY	Robert Caine Frazer	MK	5. Mark Kilby Takes a Risk	1962
MY	Robert Caine Frazer	MK	6. The Hollywood Hoax	1964
MY	Jeremy York	SF	Foul Play Suspected	1942	originally standalone without Folly
MY	Jeremy York	SF	Murder in the Family	1944	originally standalone without Folly
MY	Jeremy York	SF	Crime With Many Voices	1945	originally standalone without Folly
MY	Jeremy York	SF	No Crime More Cruel	1945	originally standalone without Folly
MY	Jeremy York	SF	Find the Body	1945
MY	Jeremy York	SF	Murder Came Late	1946
MY	Jeremy York	SF	Mystery Motive	1947	originally standalone without Folly
MY	Jeremy York	SF	Run Away to Murder	1947
MY	Jeremy York	SF	First a Murder	1947
MY	Jeremy York	SF	Close the Door on Murder	1948
MY	Jeremy York	SF	Let's Kill Uncle Lionel	1948
MY	Jeremy York	SF	The Gallows are Waiting	1948	originally standalone without Folly
MY	Michael Halliday	FB	Take a Body	1951	in UK
MY	Michael Halliday	FB	Murder in the Stars	1953	in UK
MY	Michael Halliday	FB	Man on the Run	1953	in UK
MY	Michael Halliday	FB	Lame Dog Murder	1955	in UK
MY	Jeremy York	FB	Take a Body	1972	in the US: reprint
MY	Jeremy York	FB	Murder in the Stars	1972	in the US: reprint
MY	Jeremy York	FB	Man on the Run	1972	in the US: reprint
MY	Jeremy York	FB	Lame Dog Murder	1972	in the US: reprint
MY	Michael Halliday	DC	Cunning as a Fox	1965	in UK
MY	Michael Halliday	DC	Wicked as the Devil	1966	in UK
MY	Michael Halliday	DC	Sly as a Serpent	1967	in UK
MY	Michael Halliday	DC	Cruel as a Cat	1968	in UK
MY	Michael Halliday	DC	Too Good to Be True	1969	in UK
MY	Michael Halliday	DC	A Period of Evil	1970	in UK
MY	Michael Halliday	DC	As Lonely as the Damned	1971	in UK
MY	Michael Halliday	DC	As Empty as Hate	1972	in UK
MY	Michael Halliday	DC	As Merry as Hell	1972	in UK
MY	Michael Halliday	DC	This Man Did I Kill?	1974	in UK
MY	Michael Halliday	DC	The Man Who Was Not Himself	1975	in UK
MY	Kyle Hunt	DC	Cunning as a Fox	1965	in the US: reprint
MY	Kyle Hunt	DC	Wicked as the Devil	1966	in the US: reprint
MY	Kyle Hunt	DC	Sly as a Serpent	1967	in the US: reprint
MY	Kyle Hunt	DC	Cruel as a Cat	1968	in the US: reprint
MY	Kyle Hunt	DC	Too Good to Be True	1969	in the US: reprint
MY	Kyle Hunt	DC	A Period of Evil	1971	in the US: reprint
MY	Kyle Hunt	DC	As Lonely as the Damned	1972	in the US: reprint
MY	Kyle Hunt	DC	As Empty as Hate	1972	in the US: reprint
MY	Kyle Hunt	DC	As Merry as Hell	1973	in the US: reprint
MY	Kyle Hunt	DC	This Man Did I Kill?	1974	in the US: reprint
MY	Kyle Hunt	DC	The Man Who Was Not Himself	1975	in the US: reprint
MY	Jeremy York		By Persons Unknown	1941
MY	Jeremy York		Murder Unseen	1943
MY	Jeremy York		No Alibi	1944
MY	Jeremy York		Yesterday's Murder	1945
MY	Jeremy York		Wilful Murder	1946
MY	Jeremy York		Death to My Killer	1950
MY	Jeremy York		Sentence of Death	1950
MY	Jeremy York		Voyage of Death	1952
MY	Jeremy York		Voyage with Murder	-	reprint of Voyage of Death
MY	Jeremy York		Safari with Murder	1953
MY	Jeremy York		Safari with Fear	-	reprint of Safari with Murder
MY	Jeremy York		So Soon to Die	1955
MY	Jeremy York		Seeds of Murder	1956
MY	Jeremy York		Sight of Death	1956
MY	Jeremy York		My Brother's Killer	1958
MY	Jeremy York		Hide and Kill	1959
MY	Jeremy York		To Kill or to Die	1960
MY	Jeremy York		To Kill or Die	-	reprint of To Kill or to Die
MY	Peter Manton		The Greyvale School Mystery	1937
MY	Peter Manton		Murder Manor	1937
MY	Peter Manton		Stand By for Danger	1937
MY	Peter Manton		Circle of Justice	1938
MY	Peter Manton		Three Days' Terror	1938
MY	Peter Manton		The Crime Syndicate	1939
MY	Peter Manton		Death Looks On	1939
MY	Peter Manton		Murder in the Highlands	1939
MY	Peter Manton		The Midget Marvel	1940
MY	Peter Manton		Policeman's Triumph	1948
MY	Peter Manton		Thief in the Night	1950
MY	Peter Manton		No Escape from Murder	1953
MY	Peter Manton		The Charity Killers	1954
MY	Peter Manton		The Crooked Killer	1954
MY	Gordon Ashe	PD	The Speaker	1939
MY	Gordon Ashe	PD	Death on Demand	1939
MY	Gordon Ashe	PD	Terror by Day	1940
MY	Gordon Ashe	PD	Secret Murder	1940
MY	Gordon Ashe	PD	Ware Danger	1941
MY	Gordon Ashe	PD	Murder Most Foul	1941
MY	Gordon Ashe	PD	There Goes Death	1942
MY	Gordon Ashe	PD	Death in High Places	1942
MY	Gordon Ashe	PD	Death in Flames	1943
MY	Gordon Ashe	PD	Two Men Missing	1943
MY	Gordon Ashe	PD	Rogues Rampant	1944
MY	Gordon Ashe	PD	Death on the Move	1945
MY	Gordon Ashe	PD	Invitation to Adventure	1946
MY	Gordon Ashe	PD	Here is Danger	1946
MY	Gordon Ashe	PD	Give Me Murder	1947
MY	Gordon Ashe	PD	Murder Too Late	1947
MY	Gordon Ashe	PD	Engagement with Death	1948
MY	Gordon Ashe	PD	Dark Mystery	1948
MY	Gordon Ashe	PD	A Puzzle in Pearls	1949
MY	Gordon Ashe	PD	Kill or Be Killed	1949
MY	Gordon Ashe	PD	Murder with Mushrooms	1950
MY	Gordon Ashe	PD	The Dark Circle	1951
MY	Gordon Ashe	PD	Death in Diamonds	1951
MY	Gordon Ashe	PD	Missing or Dead	1951
MY	Gordon Ashe	PD	Death in a Hurry	1952
MY	Gordon Ashe	PD	Sleepy Death	1953
MY	Gordon Ashe	PD	The Long Search	1953
MY	Gordon Ashe	PD	Drop Dead	1954	U.S. title for The Long Search
MY	Gordon Ashe	PD	Death in the Trees	1954
MY	Gordon Ashe	PD	Double for Death	1954
MY	Gordon Ashe	PD	The Kidnapped Child	1955
MY	Gordon Ashe	PD	The Snatch	-	reprint of The Kidnapped Child
MY	Gordon Ashe	PD	Day of Fear	1956
MY	Gordon Ashe	PD	Wait for Death	1957
MY	Gordon Ashe	PD	Come Home to Death	1958
MY	Gordon Ashe	PD	The Pack of Lies	1959	U.S. title for Come Home to Death,
MY	Gordon Ashe	PD	Elope to Death	1959
MY	Gordon Ashe	PD	Don't Let Him Kill	1960
MY	Gordon Ashe	PD	The Man Who Laughed at Murder	1960	U.S. title for Don't Let Him Kill
MY	Gordon Ashe	PD	The Crime Haters	1961
MY	Gordon Ashe	PD	Rogues' Ransom	1962
MY	Gordon Ashe	PD	Death from Below	1963
MY	Gordon Ashe	PD	The Big Call	1964
MY	Gordon Ashe	PD	A Promise of Diamonds	1964
MY	Gordon Ashe	PD	A Taste of Treasure	1966
MY	Gordon Ashe	PD	A Clutch of Coppers	1967
MY	Gordon Ashe	PD	A Shadow of Death	1968
MY	Gordon Ashe	PD	A Scream Of Murder	1969
MY	Gordon Ashe	PD	A Nest of Traitors	1970
MY	Gordon Ashe	PD	A Rabble of Rebels	1971
MY	Gordon Ashe	PD	A Life for a Death	1972
MY	Gordon Ashe	PD	A Herald of Doom	1973
MY	Gordon Ashe	PD	A Blast of Trumpets	1974
MY	Gordon Ashe	PD	A Plague of Demons	1975
MY	Gordon Ashe		Who Was the Jester?	1940
MY	Gordon Ashe		The Man Who Stayed Alive	1955
MY	Gordon Ashe		No Need to Die	1956
MY	Gordon Ashe		You Bet Your Life	1957
MY	Abel Mann		Danger Woman	1966
WE	Tex Riley		Gun-Smoke Range	1938
WE	Ken Ranger		One-Shot Marriott	1938
WE	Tex Riley		Two-Gun Girl	1938
WE	Ken Ranger		Roaring Guns	1939
WE	Tex Riley		Gunshot Mesa	1939
WE	William K. Riley		Range War	1939
WE	William K. Riley		Two Gun Texan	1939
WE	William K. Riley		Gun Feud	1940
WE	Tex Riley		Masked Riders	1940
WE	Tex Riley		Rustler's Range	1940
WE	Tex Riley		The Shootin' Sheriff	1940
WE	William K. Riley		Stolen Range	1940
WE	William K. Riley		Outlaw's Vengeance	1941
WE	William K. Riley		War on the Lazy-K	1941
WE	Tex Riley		Death Canyon	1941
WE	Tex Riley		Guns on the Range	1942
WE	William K. Riley		Guns over Blue Lake	1942
WE	William K. Riley		Riders of Dry Gulch	1943
WE	Tex Riley		Range Justice	1943
WE	William K. Riley		Long John Rides the Range	1944
WE	Tex Riley		Outlaw Hollow	1944
WE	William K. Riley		Miracle Range	1945
WE	Tex Riley		Hidden Range	1946
WE	William K. Riley		The Secrets of the Range	1946
WE	Tex Riley		Forgotten Range	1947
WE	Tex Riley		Trigger Justice	1948
WE	Tex Riley		Bullet Justice	1949
WE	Tex Riley		Lynch Hollow	1949
WE	William K. Riley		Outlaw Guns	1949
WE	William K. Riley		Range Vengeance	1953
RO	Margaret Cooke		For Love's Sake	1934
RO	Elise Fecamps		Lover of Hate	1936
RO	Margaret Cooke		False Love or True	1937
RO	Margaret Cooke		Troubled Journey	1937
RO	Elise Fecamps		Love's Triumph	1937
RO	Elise Fecamps		True Love	1937
RO	Henry St John Cooper		Chains of Love	1937
RO	Henry St John Cooper		Love's Pilgrimage	1937
RO	Margaret Cooke		A Mannequin's Romance	1938
RO	Margaret Cooke		Fate's Playthings	1938
RO	Margaret Cooke		Love Calls Twice	1938
RO	Margaret Cooke		The Road to Happiness	1938
RO	Margaret Cooke		Web of Destiny	1938
RO	Margaret Cooke		Whose Lover?	1938
RO	Henry St John Cooper		The Greater Desire	1938
RO	Henry St John Cooper		The Tangled Legacy	1938
RO	Margaret Cooke		The Turn of Fate	1939
RO	Margaret Cooke		Crossroads of Love	1939
RO	Margaret Cooke		Love Comes Back	1939
RO	Margaret Cooke		Love Triumphant	1939
RO	Henry St John Cooper		Love's Ordeal	1939
RO	Margaret Cooke		Love's Journey	1940
RO	Henry St John Cooper		The Lost Lover	1940
