= Gideon's Way =

British TV crime series (1964–1966)

- Created by: John Creasey
- Starring: John Gregson; Alexander Davion
- Theme music composer: Edwin Astley
- Composer: Edwin Astley
- Country of origin: United Kingdom
- Original language: English
- No. of series: 1
- No. of episodes: 26

Production
- Producers: Robert S. Baker; Monty Berman
- Running time: 50 mins
- Production company: New World Productions

Original release
- Network: ITV
- Release: 17 October 1964 – 10 May 1966

Gideon's Way is a British television crime series that was made by ITC Entertainment and broadcast by ITV in 1964–1966, following the 1958 film, Gideon’s Day. The film and series are based on novels by John Creasey (writing as 'J. J. Marric') and follow the character George Gideon of Scotland Yard. The series was made at Elstree Studios in twin production with The Saint television series, which was likewise produced by Robert S. Baker and Monty Berman.

== Synopsis ==
Gideon was shown as a family man at home—though urgent phone calls from his bosses tend to disrupt family plans too often. They live in an expensive detached house in Tufnell Park.

== Cast ==
The series stars John Gregson in the titular role as Commander George Gideon of Scotland Yard, with Alexander Davion as his assistant, Detective Chief Inspector David Keen, Reginald Jessup as Det. Superintendent LeMaitre (nicknamed Lem or Lemmy), Ian Rossiter as Detective Chief Superintendent Joe Bell and Basil Dignam as Commissioner Scott-Marle.

Daphne Anderson starred as Gideon's wife, Kate; their three children were played by Giles Watling as younger son Malcolm, Richard James as elder son Matthew (who seemed to have a lot of new girlfriends), and Andrea Allan as daughter Pru.

=== Guest stars ===
Many well-known British actors appear in guest roles, including Patrick Allen, Keith Baxter, George Cole, Harry Fowler, Gordon Jackson, Ronald Lacey, Anton Rodgers, Rosemary Leach, Gerald Harper, Victor Maddern, Richard Carpenter and John Hurt. There was an early role for Donald Sutherland in the episode "The Millionaire's Daughter". Several actors, including Mike Pratt, Angela Douglas, Jean Marsh and Kay Walsh, appear twice in the series, cast in different roles.

== Production ==
There was extensive location shooting in mid-1960s London. The show was broadcast in the United States under the title Gideon CID. There were different starting titles for the American series, showing incidents of violent crime while the British titles just introduced the main characters. The theme music was composed by Edwin Astley. In scoring the incidental music, Astley re-used some of the cues from The Saint on which he was also working; in turn, he re-purposed material composed for this series in The Baron, which followed a year later.

== Episodes ==
Episodes were filmed between June 1964 and May 1965, on location and at Elstree Studios. Fifteen episodes (#101 – #115 below) were filmed by December 1964, after which the cast and crew were allowed a week's break before filming on the second batch of eleven episodes (#116 – #126 below) began on 11 January 1965. All episodes were filmed in black-and-white.

Airdate is for ATV Midlands. ITV regions varied date and order. The first transmission was on ATV London on 17 October 1964 (The 'V' Men).

No.	Title	Directed by	Written by	Original release date	Prod. code	Filmed
1	"State Visit"	John Moxey	Jim O'Connolly	18 March 1965	106	Aug – Sept 1964
Based on a storyline in Gideon's March. Alfie Bass portrays an elderly German Jew, Max Fischer, a chemist who suffered at the hands of the Nazis during the Second World War. Upset by the announcement of a state visit by the German President, he takes possession of 10oz of nitroglycerin—enough to kill his target and possibly hundreds more at the parade in Whitehall, where Gideon's wife and son are also watching. Also features Gerald Harper as Deputy Commissioner Rae Cox, David Lodge as Morris and Julian Holloway as Jim Richards.
2	"The 'V' Men"	Cyril Frankel	Alan Falconer	25 March 1965	102	mid July 1964
Based on a storyline in Gideon's Vote. This features Sir Arthur Vane's fascist V-Party, which is opposed by the anything-but-peaceful Peace Party. Someone is trying to kill Vane (Roland Culver). Also features Christine Finn as Marjorie Bennett, Bryan Marshall as Braithwaite, Angela Douglas as Cathy Miller, Peter Russell as John Hamilton and Inigo Jackson as Leo Samson.
3	"The Firebug"	Roy Ward Baker	David Chantler	1 April 1965	107	September 1964
Based on a storyline in Gideon's Fire (1961). George Cole plays a man whose wife and young daughter died in a house fire. He starts setting fires to make people take notice of the danger of fire but after killing four people (including a PC), he goes onto bigger fires, setting fire to a paint warehouse. He then gets hold of four sticks of dynamite. Also features Edward Dentith as Det. Insp. Dillon, Aubrey Richards as Det. Sgt. Steve Brady, Joby Blanshard as Bill White and Martin Boddey as Chief Officer Carmichael.
4	"The Big Fix"	James Hill	Jack Whittingham	8 April 1965	109	late September 1964
Based on a storyline in Gideon's Risk. Gamblers pay big money to people to dope horses so they lose, and kill them if the horse wins. After a favourite has lost, Gideon tries to stop it happening again. Stars Michael Ripper as Jo Short, Penelope Horner as Janet Middleton, Maurice Hedley as Col. Alec Middleton, Robert Brown as Bill Campbell and Griffith Davies as Jimmy.
5	"The Housekeeper"	Leslie Norman	David Chantler	15 April 1965	112	late October 1964
Based on a storyline in Gideon's Month. A housekeeper (Kay Walsh) looks after old men and murders them for their money. She has her new victim lined up after electrician and ex-con (Harry Fowler) finds her previous victim. Also features John Dearth as Det. Supt. Warr and Richard Davies as the Postman.
6	"The Lady-Killer"	Leslie Norman	David Chantler	22 April 1965	108	Sept. 1964
Based on a storyline in Gideon's Month. A man marries rich women who die apparently accidentally soon afterwards, so D.C.I. David Keen investigates. Gideon takes a back seat in this story. Also features Ray Barrett as Robert Carne, Rosemary Leach as Marion Grove, Timothy Bateson as Parker, Howard Lang as Sgt. Fowler and John Tate as Bert Macey.
7	"To Catch a Tiger"	Leslie Norman	Iain MacCormick	29 April 1965	103	July 1964
Based on a storyline in Gideon's Risk. An employee's theft gives Gideon a chance to reopen an old murder case but he finds himself up against a formidable lawyer, Sir Percy Richmond (Raymond Huntley). Also features Norman Bird as Supt. Fred Lee, Glyn Houston as Det. Sgt. Carmichael and Patsy Smart as Mrs. Samuels.
8	"Big Fish, Little Fish"	Cyril Frankel	Alan Falconer	6 May 1965	111	Oct. 1964
Based on a storyline in Gideon's Month. This story is about petty theft and children taught to steal by mothers from hell. Mark 'Frisky' Lee (Maxwell Shaw) is seen to be the head of organised crime around the Petticoat Lane area of London; he makes enemies more easily than friends. When he is murdered, Gideon and local cop Superintendent Bill Hemmingway uncover thieves, a fence and a murderer. Also features Sydney Tafler as Gabriel Lyon, Angela Baddeley as Mrs. Clark and Harry Towb as Ted Cowan.
9	"The White Rat"	Roy Ward Baker	Harry W. Junkin	13 May 1965	105	Aug. 1964
Based on a storyline in Gideon's Staff. Something of a love story. Sgt Sid Taylor, who walked a beat with Gideon when they were PCs and taught him a lot, is after an albino criminal (Ray McAnally) and his gang. A number of things go wrong; the criminal is cornered on a ship, but threatens a massive explosion if they try to take him. Also features Dermot Kelly as Fingers and Richard Beale as Capt. Vanner.
10	"How to Retire without Really Working"	George Pollock	Norman Hudis	20 May 1965	115	Nov–Dec. 1964
Based on a storyline in Gideon's Lot. Gideon defuses a gun siege where a small-time crook went out of his league in the hope of a big robbery before retiring. Meanwhile, a couple in their fifties (Eric Barker and Joyce Grant) who have lived a life of petty crime try to do the same thing with a big wages snatch but Gideon has his eye on them. Gideon portrays the friendly cop in this episode, trying to help criminals who are obviously on the downward path. Also features William Mervyn as Mr. Pater, Charles Lloyd-Pack as Mr. Hunter and Henry McGee as Mark Martinson.
11	"Subway to Revenge"	Roy Ward Baker	Norman Hudis	27 May 1965	117	Jan 1965
Based on a storyline in Gideon's Ride. On a crowded platform, John Stewart (Bryan Pringle) tries to push James Lane (Donald Churchill) in front of a train, but he is saved by colleague Ellen Winters (Anne Lawson). He wants nothing to do with it but she takes it to the police. Another attempt is made to push him in front of a bus. Again he does not seem to be interested that someone is trying to murder him and though Ellen is obviously in love with him, he gets angry with her over it and wants nothing to do with her. Then suddenly they are in love. Pringle it turns out lost a fiancée when she tried to steal £5,000 from a company and when caught, committed suicide by jumping in front of an Underground train so he is now busy killing those responsible. There is a background story about a wages snatch. Also features Esmond Knight as Robson and Don McKillop as the Foreman.
12	"The Great Plane Robbery"	Leslie Norman	Alan Falconer	3 June 1965	122	Mar–Apr 1965
New storyline. £1,000,000 worth of gold is stolen from a Russian Aeroflot plane at a small airfield. The brains behind it, Bailey (George Baker) has an alibi, which is just too good. There are complications when the driver of a decoy van is picked up and is obviously in on it. It all begins to fall apart when one of the men, Dobson (Edwin Richfield) is burned by molten gold being recast. Lured by the £100,000 reward, a bent doctor treating him phones the police who follow Bailey and others to Tilbury where he plans to escape by boat. Also features George Murcell as Kautsky, Julian Somers as Cameron, and Reg Lye as Dr. Hill.
13	"Gang War"	Quentin Lawrence	David Chantler	10 June 1965	118	Jan–Feb. 1965
Based on a storyline in Gideon's Night. Jerry Blake (Ronald Lacey) is moving in on Frank Romano's (Ray Brooks) small-business protection racket. Both are leaders of gangs of young men and trouble is brewing. But Romano's wife, Lollo (Jane Merrow) is unhappy with their lifestyle and uses an old boyfriend to arrange the snatch of over £400,000 of old money meant for burning. Romano joins up with Blake to do the robbery while their gangs do a fake rumble to lure the police elsewhere. Also features Donald Morley as Supt. Browning and Will Stampe as Tony Mazzo.
14	"The Tin God"	John Gilling	Harry W. Junkin	17 June 1965	101	29 June to early July 1964
Based on a storyline in Gideon's Week. Derren Nesbitt plays violent gangster Benson who has escaped from jail and who is idolised by his son Syd (Michael Cashman), but hates his wife Ruby (Jennifer Wilson) for putting him in jail. Before he escapes from the country Benson wants to kill Ruby. Also features John Hurt as his accomplice.
15	"The Alibi Man"	Cyril Frankel	Iain MacCormick	24 June 1965	119	Feb. 1965
Based on a storyline in Gideon's March. Famous racing driver Bruce Carroway (Jack Hedley) has been fiddling the books and is caught by his accountant (Geoffrey Palmer), whom he kills to keep him quiet. Mechanic Eric Little (James Culliford) gives him an alibi because he owes his life to him. Gideon investigates and Carroway decides that his mistress Marjorie (Jennifer Daniel) needs to die too. But when Little collects Marjorie from her apartment to take her to her death, they are spotted by Marjorie's younger sister (Nicola Pagett). A rare case where the murderer gets away with it. Also features Michael Collins as Det. Supt. Brown, and Keith Anderson as Det. Insp. Elmhurst.
16	"The Wall"	Leslie Norman	David Chantler	16 September 1965	116	Jan. 1965
From a storyline in Gideon's Night. A young couple, Michael and Netta Penn (Richard Carpenter and Ann Bell) dream of escaping from their dingy lodgings and curmudgeonly, drunken landlord and his wife (John Barrie and Megs Jenkins). A lucky football pools win appears to be their way out, but the greedy landlord accidentally kills Penn before his wife learns of the win and hides the body so he can steal Penn's winnings. Netta is made to believe he has left her. A chance encounter with Gideon on another case leads Netta to plead that he locate her missing husband.
17	"The Thin Red Line"	Cyril Frankel	Iain MacCormick	3 February 1966	121	March 1965
New storyline. The famous Balaclava regimental silver is going missing, pieces at a time, from the Highlanders' London HQ with fakes being put in their place. Gideon is called in by the elderly General (Finlay Currie) to find out who is doing it but comes up against regimental pride and secrecy. Keen goes to Amsterdam and Paris (library footage used) to find out where the silver is being copied and sold off. The result is a shock to Gideon. Also stars Allan Cuthbertson as Major Donald Ross, Gordon Jackson as Sgt. McKinnon and Donald Pickering as Bookie Barton-Smith.
18	"A Perfect Crime"	Leslie Norman	Alan Falconer	10 February 1966	126	May 1965
Based on a storyline in Gideon's Fire (1961). Patrick Allen plays someone who socially mixes with rich people and finds out when they are away so he and his accomplice (Patrick Bedford) can steal their jewels. Bedford is caught when a cop on a bike sees a car at a rich place where the owners have asked him to keep a watch on it as they are away. His wife Sandra (Jean Marsh) tries to blackmail Allen so he kills her, which leads to Gideon being publicly accused of attacking Bedford by his very nasty lawyer as they close in on Allen, who is ready to flee the country. Also stars Ann Lynn as Ann Beaumont, Alec Mango as Hartz and Richard Davies as Taxi Driver.
19	"The Millionaire's Daughter"	Cyril Frankel	Norman Hudis	17 February 1966	124	April 1965
Based on a storyline in Gideon's Lot. A con man, Alan Blake (Don Borisenko), arrives by ship from America with the millionaire Hendersons (David Bauer and Lois Maxwell) and their daughter Nina (Lans Traverse). Along with confederates he kidnaps Nina in London and they hold her for a million-dollar ransom. The newspapers get hold of the story and Blake decides to get out while he can, tricking Mrs Henderson out of $500,000 worth of jewellery. This means that the daughter is now left with the homicidal Philip Guest (Donald Sutherland) who wants to kill her as she has seen their faces. Also stars Harold Goodwin as the Shopkeeper and Alec Ross as Frank Simmons.
20	"Morna"	Cyril Frankel	Alan Falconer	24 February 1966	110	Oct. 1964
New storyline. Morna Copthorne's (Angela Douglas) body is found by a lake. Gideon is asked to go to the small village of Wendley (this case unusually did not feature London) to sort the matter out, as her father Sir Robert (Ronald Adam) is a big name at the Ministry of Defence. She is the girl everyone loved so how did she die? As Gideon and Keen interview witnesses, including Morna's American schoolfriend Lydia (Alita Naughton) and her fiance Michael (Norman Bowler) about her past, a new picture emerges of a young rich girl out of control. Johnny Sekka plays the surly nightclub proprietor Chay, and his portrayal reflects the racial tensions of the time. Also stars Kay Walsh as headmistress Harriet Bright, John Justin as her husband Leonard and Shelagh Fraser as Lady Copthorne.
21	"Boy With Gun"	Jeremy Summers	Iain MacCormick	3 March 1966	125	May 1965
New storyline. A tale of boys gone wrong. Chris Kirk (Howard Knight) has been mothered too much but his father, Police Surgeon Doctor Kirk (Anthony Bate) is overbearing. When cornered by three leather-coated, knife-wielding yobs who want to steal the shotgun his father bought him, Chris shoots one. Believing he has murdered him, he goes on the run and meets a boy who has escaped from Borstal. They go to his brother's place so he can arrange their escape from the country but the shot boy's father (George Sewell) finds out and wants to kill the kid who shot his son. A powerful story filmed mainly around London's East End. Also features Michael Craze as Vince Kelly, Michael Standing as Chaz Kelly and Royston Tickner as Charlie Berry.
22	"Fall High, Fall Hard"	Leslie Norman	Malcolm Hulke	15 April 1966	114	Nov 1964
Based on a storyline in Gideon's Fire (1961). A big construction company is owned by two men. Honest Donald Houston finds out his crooked partner Victor Maddern has hired men to intimidate and kill people to further their business. Houston's character wants to do something about it so others decide to kill him. Also stars Glyn Houston as Det. Sgt. Carmichael, Mike Pratt as Jenson, Gordon Gostelow as Thompson, Clifford Earl as Sgt. Bailey and Michael Robbins as Smith.
23	"The Prowler"	Robert Tronson	Harry W. Junkin	22 April 1966	120	March 1965
Based on a storyline in Gideon's Night. This occurs in the thick fogs of the time, due to most people using coal fires to keep warm, and the episode tries for a creepy atmosphere. The girlfriend of a young man (David Collings) has committed suicide causing him to become mentally unbalanced and he now attacks girls at night and cuts off some of their hair as a souvenir. One girl fights back and scratches him and as the police close in, he visits an unsuspecting girlfriend to hide at her place.
24	"The Reluctant Witness"	Jeremy Summers	Norman Hudis	26 April 1966	123	April 1965
Based on a storyline in Gideon's Risk. Red Carter (Mike Pratt) and brother Syd (David Gregory) buy wrecked cars then steal new cars of the same make and swap details and after a respray, sell them at a high price. Tiny Bray, who spent four years in prison because of them, tries to get evidence of this; he is seen and is beaten by Syd and dies, but there is a witness (Audrey Nicholson). The police trick Syd into confessing but then the harder job begins of getting brother Red who is trying to kill the witness. Trevor Bannister plays the constable who is assigned to keep her alive for the trial. The climax of the show is when the villains are cornered and pull guns, and the police are unarmed. Gideon says that the average burglary nets only £71 whereas a car theft (2,484 stolen one month in 1965) gets £500. Also features Gretchen Franklin as Martha Bray and Jolyon Booth as Radio Man.
25	"The Rhyme and the Reason"	John Gilling	Jack Whittingham	3 May 1966	104	Aug. 1964
Based on a storyline in Gideon's Week. A young couple row and the girl is later found dead. All the evidence points to her Mod boyfriend. The boyfriend's sister is a friend of Gideon's daughter, and visits Gideon's home to ask him to investigate. Stars Alan Rothwell and Carol White as the couple, with Duncan Lamont as Divisional Supt. Smedd, Jo Rowbottom as Mary Rose and Edward Evans as Fred Norton. Filmed in studio and at various locations in Battersea, also portraying an incidental background of Mods and Rockers street culture.
26	"The Nightlifers"	John Moxey	Iain MacCormick	10 May 1966	113	Nov. 1964
New storyline. Four teens are led into a life of violence by Anton Rodgers who has upper-class pretensions and lives on a Chelsea houseboat with parties every night. Rodgers plays a contemptuous sadist whose idea of fun is hurting people, mirroring teen crime at the time. This was the last show to be broadcast and the series ended on a high note. Also starred Derek Fowlds as Tim Coles, Annette Andre as Sue Young, Jean Marsh as Elspeth McRae, Harry Locke as Joe Moss, Roddy McMillan as Det. Insp. Caldwell and Richard Hurndall as Mr. King.

== Broadcasters ==
=== United Kingdom ===
The series began a repeat run in October 2019 at 9pm on Talking Pictures TV. This revival ended on 18 February 2020 with "The Nightlifers" including an onscreen tribute to guest star Derek Fowlds who died in January 2020. The series was shown again on the channel in Spring 2021, in April 2022 and in 2025.

=== Australia ===
The Australian rights are held by the Nine Network who, over many decades, have shown numerous repeats in non-peak viewing times. From 2012 to now, there were numerous showings in the early hours of the morning on Gem, a Nine Network digital outlet, sometimes twice per morning. The Gideon's Way repeats alternate with re-screenings of another British series Danger Man, and of the Canadian program Seaway.

== DVD ==
All 26 episodes were released on Region 2 DVD by Network Distributing in August 2005.
