= George Gideon =

- Jack Hawkins in the film Gideon's Day; John Gregson in the TV series Gideon's Way
- First appearance: Gideon's Day
- Last appearance: Gideon's Fear
- Created by: John Creasey (as J.J. Marric)
- Portrayed by: Jack Hawkins (film); John Gregson (television)

In-universe information
- Gender: Male
- Occupation: Police detective
- Spouse: Kate Gideon
- Children: Tom Gideon (son); Prudence Gideon (daughter); Priscilla Gideon (daughter); Matthew Gideon (son); Penelope Hobbs (daughter); Malcolm Gideon (son)
- Relatives: George Hobbs (grandson)
- Nationality: British

Superintendent/Commander George Gideon of Scotland Yard is a fictional policeman who appeared in 26 police procedural novels, 21 of which were written by John Creasey under the pseudonym J.J. Marric, and published between 1955 and 1976. Portraying Gideon as a master balancing the management of cases and the workings of law enforcement, it has been considered his "most famous police procedural series". After Creasey's death, the series was continued in five further novels by William Vivian Butler.

Anthony Boucher of the New York Times Book Review considered the first of the books, Gideon's Day (1955), to be author's best book. H. R. F. Keating, reviewer for the London Times picked Gideon's Week (1956) as one of the "100 Best Crime and Mystery Books" (1845-1986). Gideon's Fire (1962) won the Edgar Award from the Mystery Writers of America.

== Character ==
George Gideon ("G.G." or "Gee-Gee" to coppers and crooks alike) is powerfully built but has a gentle voice. He has pale-blue eyes. He is famed for his prodigious feats of memory and his ability to handle a bewildering work-load of cases simultaneously. Despite his seniority in rank, Gideon often takes a hands-on approach and on occasions physically engages with criminals. He is respected and liked by his staff - but they know to keep their heads down when his temper is aroused. In the first novel, Gideon's Day he holds the rank of Detective Superintendent, but in the second Gideon's Week, he has been promoted to Commander, and is the operational head of the Yard's entire CID, a position he holds for the rest of the series.

One of Creasey's technical advisers for the series was Commander George Hatherill, who had organized the British Army's Special Investigation Branch during World War II, and was the operational head of the Yard's CID from 1954 until 1964 (the same position Gideon held in fiction) during which time he was awarded the OBE. Hatherill is generally believed to have been Creasey's model for Gideon.

== Family ==
Throughout the series, Marric emphasizes the pressure experienced by police families due to the demands of police work, and the impact of distress in the family on the ability to work. Gideon is married to Kate, and has six surviving children. Their relationship has been strained by the loss of a seventh child while Gideon was on the Flying Squad (prior to the start of the series). In Gideon's Day , the first book in the series, the children are described as Tom (age 26); Prudence (18+), Priscilla (15+), Matthew (14), Penelope (12), and Malcolm (8). The oldest children are self-supporting; the younger ones in school. As the series progresses, the children train for careers, move out, and marry. Family relationships are usually mentioned only briefly, to establish a time frame or as they relate to or affect Gideon's work.

Penny, the Gideons' youngest daughter, is mentioned most frequently, in part because of her on-and-off relationship with an older police officer, Alec Hobbs. In Gideon's Wrath (1967) Alec Hobbs' first wife Helen dies, around the time that Hobbs becomes Gideon's deputy. In Gideon's River (1968) Hobbs escorts Penelope to the river gala, accompanying Gideon and Kate. In Gideon's Way, written by William Vivian Butler and published in 1983, Alec and Penny are married and have a son, George.

The number of children was reduced in the television series.

== Film and television ==
In Gideon's Day (1958, directed by John Ford, USA title: Gideon Of Scotland Yard), Gideon is played by Jack Hawkins. The co-stars were Anna Lee (Kate Gideon), Dianne Foster (Joanna Delafield), Ronald Howard (Paul Delafield), Cyril Cusack (Birdy Sparrow), and Andrew Ray (PC Simon Farnaby-Green). The film was released by Columbia Pictures and is only loosely based on the book of the same title. Ford treats it as a comedy-melodrama, whereas the book is a more serious and straightforward procedural.

A 26-part television series Gideon's Way (USA title: Gideon C.I.D.) was made in 1964, starring John Gregson, and ran until 1966 in the UK, produced by ITC Entertainment.

== Bibliography ==
1. Gideon's Day (1955)
2. Gideon's Week (1956)
3. Gideon's Night (1957)
4. Gideon's Month (1958)
5. Gideon's Staff (1959)
6. Gideon's Risk (1960)
7. Gideon's Fire (1961)
8. Gideon's March (1962)
9. Gideon's Ride (1963)
10. Gideon's Vote (1964)
11. Gideon's Lot (1965)
12. Gideon's Badge (1966)
13. Gideon's Wrath (1967)
14. Gideon's River (1968)
15. Gideon's Power (1969)
16. Gideon's Sport (1970)
17. Gideon's Art (1971)
18. Gideon's Men (1972)
19. Gideon's Press (1973)
20. Gideon's Fog (1975)
21. Gideon's Drive (1976)
22. Gideon and the Young Toughs and Other Stories (2022, collection of short stories originally published between 1961 and 1975).

Gideon at Work (1957) Three Volumes in one, Gideon's Day, Gideon's Week, Gideon's Night

The series was continued after Creasey's death by William Vivian Butler:

- Gideon's Force (1978)
- Gideon's Law (1981)
- Gideon's Way (1983)
- Gideon's Raid (1986)
- Gideon's Fear (1990)

== Gideon's staff and family ==
Title (Year)	Gideon's Position	Gideon's Assistant	Assistant Commissioner for Crime	Commissioner	Children mentioned
Gideon's Day (1955) vt. Gideon of Scotland Yard	Superintendent, New Scotland Yard	Chief Inspector Lemaitre (wife Fifi)	Assistant Commissioner, A.C.		Tom (26); Prudence (18+), Priscilla (15+), Matthew (14), Penelope (12), Malcolm (8)
Gideon's Week (1956) vt. Seven Days To Death	Commander, CID	Chief Inspector Lemaitre	Assistant Commissioner, A.C.	Commissioner	Tom (living in North of England); Prudence ("eldest daughter"), Priscilla (age 16), Matthew, Penelope ("their youngest girl"), Malcolm (age 9)
Gideon's Night (1957)	Commander	Chief Inspector Lemaitre (Fifi leaves, Lemaitre to switch to Chief Superintendent on nights)	Assistant Commissioner		Prudence, Matthew (age 17), Penelope
Gideon's Month (1958) vt. A Backwards Jump	Commander	Chief Inspector Lemaitre	Assistant Commissioner, "A.C.", "Old Man"	Commissioner	Prudence, Priscilla (18), Matthew (17), Penelope (14), Malcolm (5 children at home)
Gideon's Staff (1959) vt. Thugs And Economies	Commander	Lemaitre is Chief Superintendent on night duty; Riddell (temporary); Bell (temporary)	Hugh Rogerson (announces retirement)	Sir Reginald Scott-Marle	Prudence (22, violinist, planning to marry Peter), Matthew, Penelope, Malcolm
Gideon's Risk (1960) vt. Gideon Combats Influence	Commander	Chief Inspector Joe Bell	Rogerson (back from 6 months leave)	Sir Reginald Scott-Marle, Commissioner	Tom (28, married, north of England), Prudence (23, married to Peter); Priscilla (nearly 21), Matthew (studying for scholarship), Penelope (nearly 17), Malcolm (15)
Gideon's Fire (1961)	Commander	Joe Bell	Rogerson	Sir Reginald Scott-Marle, Commissioner	Tom (married), Prudence (married); Priscilla (nearly 21), Matthew (not yet 19), Penelope (16), Malcolm (13)
Gideon's March (1962) vt. A Conference For Assassins	Commander	Joe Bell	Rogerson	Sir Reginald Scott-Marle	Priscilla, Penelope, Malcolm
Gideon's Ride (1963) vt. Travelling Crimes	Commander	Lemaitre (has remarried 2 years after 1st wife leaves)	Rogerson	Sir Reginald Scott-Marle	Tom (married), Prudence (married), Matthew (Cambridge); Priscilla, Penelope, Malcolm
Gideon's Vote (1964) vt. An Uncivilised Election	Commander	Lemaitre (temporary substitute for Gideon)	Rogerson	Sir Reginald Scott-Marle	Priscilla (23), Penelope (19), Malcolm (15)
Gideon's Lot (1965) vt. Criminal Imports	Commander	Lemaitre (has now been married 3 years to Chloe)	Rogerson (critically ill)	Sir Reginald Scott-Marle	Prudence (pregnant), Priscilla is married to Dick & living in Midlands
Gideon's Badge (1966) vt. To Nail A Serial Killer	Commander	Lemaitre (temporarily substitutes for Gideon)	vacant	Sir Reginald Scott-Marle	
Gideon's Wrath (1967) vt. From Murder to a Cathedral	Commander	Lemaitre, Alec Hobbs (recommended to Deputy Commander; wife Helen dies)	vacant	Sir Reginald Scott-Marle	
Gideon's River (1968)	Commander	Deputy Commander Alec Hobbs	Commissioner ("away")	Sir Reginald Scott-Marle	Penelope
Gideon's Power (1969) vt. Darkness and Confusion	Commander	Deputy Commander Alec Hobbs	Commissioner ("relatively new")	Sir Reginald Scott-Marle	Tom, Prudence, Matthew (married); Priscilla, Penelope, Malcolm (19)
Gideon's Sport (1970) vt. Sport, Heat, & Scotland Yard	Commander	Deputy Commander Alec Hobbs		Sir Reginald Scott-Marle	Penelope, Malcolm
Gideon's Art (1971)	Commander	Deputy Commander Alec Hobbs	Wilson Chamberlain	Sir Reginald Scott-Marle	Prudence & Peter have a five-year-old; Penelope, Malcolm
Gideon's Men (1972) vt. No Relaxation At Scotland Yard	Commander	Deputy Commander Alec Hobbs	Donaldson	Sir Reginald Scott-Marle	Priscilla (married); Penelope, Malcolm
Gideon's Press (1973) vt. Impartiality Against The Mob	Commander	Deputy Commander Alec Hobbs	Gideon 'doubles' post of A.C.	Sir Reginald Scott-Marle	Penelope
Gideon's Fog (1975) vt. Not Hidden By The Fog	Commander	Deputy Commander Alec Hobbs	vacant	Sir Reginald Scott-Marle	Penelope
Gideon's Drive (1976) vt. Good And Justice	Commander	Detective Inspector Tiger (temporary substitute for Deputy Commander Alec Hobbs)	vacant	Sir Reginald Scott-Marle	No children at home
