= Gideon's Day (film) =

1958 British film by John Ford

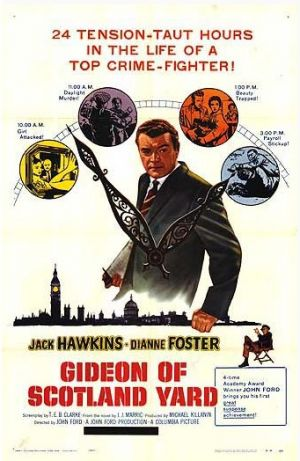
- US film poster with the US title
- Directed by: John Ford
- Screenplay by: T. E. B. Clarke
- Based on: Gideon's Day by J.J. Marric
- Produced by: Michael Killanin
- Starring: Jack Hawkins; Dianne Foster
- Cinematography: Freddie Young
- Edited by: Raymond Poulton
- Music by: Douglas Gamley
- Distributed by: Columbia Productions
- Release dates: 21 March 1958 (United Kingdom); 22 June 1958 (United States)
- Running time: 91 minutes
- Countries: United Kingdom; United States
- Language: English

Gideon's Day (U.S. title: Gideon of Scotland Yard) is a 1958 police procedural crime film directed by John Ford and starring Jack Hawkins, Dianne Foster and Cyril Cusack. The screenplay was by T.E.B. Clarke, adapted from the 1955 novel of the same title by John Creasey (credited under his pen-name "J.J. Marric").

This was the first film to feature a character named George Gideon, but Jack Hawkins had played a similar role in the British film The Long Arm (1956) two years earlier. Gideon was later played by John Gregson in the TV series Gideon's Way.

== Plot ==
The film follows a day in the life of Detective Chief Inspector George Gideon of the Metropolitan Police. His day starts when he receives information that one of his officers has been taking bribes. Despite his hectic schedule, his wife reminds him his daughter has a violin recital that evening; she also tells him her aunt and uncle are coming for tea before the concert. This becomes a recurring theme throughout the film, as Gideon is continually hampered in his efforts to finish work and return home.

On the way to Scotland Yard he drops his daughter off at the Royal College of Music, but is stopped by a young constable for jumping a red light. Once at his office, he calls in the detective whom a "snout" [i.e. informant] has told him is taking bribes and suspends him. Gideon then gets word that an escaped mental patient from Manchester is on his way to London. Meanwhile, an audacious gang is robbing payrolls.

The mental patient is soon arrested, but not before he has killed the daughter of his former landlady. Gideon wants to congratulate personally the policeman who made the arrest, only to discover it is the same young officer who gave him a summons for his early morning traffic offence. Various jobs then preoccupy the chief inspector while his detectives continue to investigate the bribery case. News then arrives that the suspended policeman has been run down by a car — whose tyre tracks match one used in the earlier payroll jobs. After Gideon visits the dead officer's wife, evidence soon emerges that links the dead detective to a woman, Mrs. Delafield, who went to clubs he frequented.

Gideon goes to her address and discovers that the woman's husband Paul was responsible for the robberies, because he wanted the financial means to be a painter. The husband then tricks his wife into holding a gun on Gideon while he makes his escape. The policeman uses his calm manner to defuse the situation. Before he can return home, the phone rings again. A safety deposit firm has been robbed by a gang of rich socialites who have been cornered inside. When the police finally draw them out, Gideon catches one of the gang himself, but he loses his temper when he finds out that the elderly night watchman was killed in cold blood by the man he arrested, telling him "you'll hang for this, you rich nobody!"

Finally Gideon gets home. His wife tells him that their daughter has met a nice young man at her recital. It turns out it's the young constable again. He had been holding the chief inspector's concert ticket all day following their first encounter that morning. This led him to meet Gideon's daughter, who is quite taken by him but just as they are all sitting down to supper, the phone rings one last time. A man believed to be Paul the painter has been arrested at London Airport. The film concludes with a final irony. The young constable, who is driving Gideon to the airport, is stopped by another policeman as he races through the capital's foggy streets for jumping a red light — and is unable to produce his driving licence.

Mrs Gideon meanwhile advises her smitten daughter to never marry a policeman.

== Cast ==
- Jack Hawkins as DCI George Gideon
- Dianne Foster as Joanna Delafield
- Anna Lee as Kate Gideon
- Anna Massey as Sally Gideon
- Andrew Ray as PC Simon Farnaby-Green
- Howard Marion-Crawford as The Chief
- John Loder as Ponsford "The Duke"
- Michael Trubshawe as Sergeant "Golly" Golightly
- Derek Bond as Detective Sergeant Kirby
- Grizelda Hervey as Mrs Kirby
- Henry Longhurst as The Vicar
- Jack Watling as Reverend Small, the Curate
- Cyril Cusack as Herbert 'Birdie' Sparrow
- Maureen Potter as Mrs Sparrow
- Laurence Naismith as Arthur Sayer
- Miles Malleson as Judge
- Ronald Howard as Paul Delafield
- Francis Crowdy as Francis Fitzhubert
- James Hayter as Robert Mason
- John Le Mesurier as Prosecuting Counsel (uncredited)
- Robert Raglan as Dawson (uncredited)

== Production ==
The film, which was shot on location in and around London, was Anna Massey's cinematic debut (she was aged 19 at the time). Interiors were completed at the MGM-British Studios, Borehamwood in Hertfordshire, England.

== Reception ==
The Monthly Film Bulletin wrote: "Although it packs in a large quantity of varied incident, Gideon's Day is limited in scope by an extremely predictable script and a surfeit of pseudo-comic dialogue. The whole thing, in fact, is fairly anonymous in tone, and apart from a certain routine efficiency (and, perhaps, two or three characteristic camera setups), there is no evidence of John Ford's presence. Apparently, the new locale has failed to stimulate him, as the locations are few and far between and there is no real response to the London scene. Judged as a routine entertainment thriller, complete with cosy domestic scenes, comic figures of authority and nasty crooks, the film remains on the tamely competent level of its many predecessors. A never-ending parade of character players includes a number of seldom seen faces (Anna Lee, John Loder) as well as more familiar ones masquerading under a variety of Cockney, Irish and upper-class accents. Jack Hawkins, stoical and indomitable as ever, is in complete command of every situation, even in a day which appears to include more than the customary 24 hours."
