= Jack Hawkins =

British actor (1910–1973)

Jack Hawkins CBE
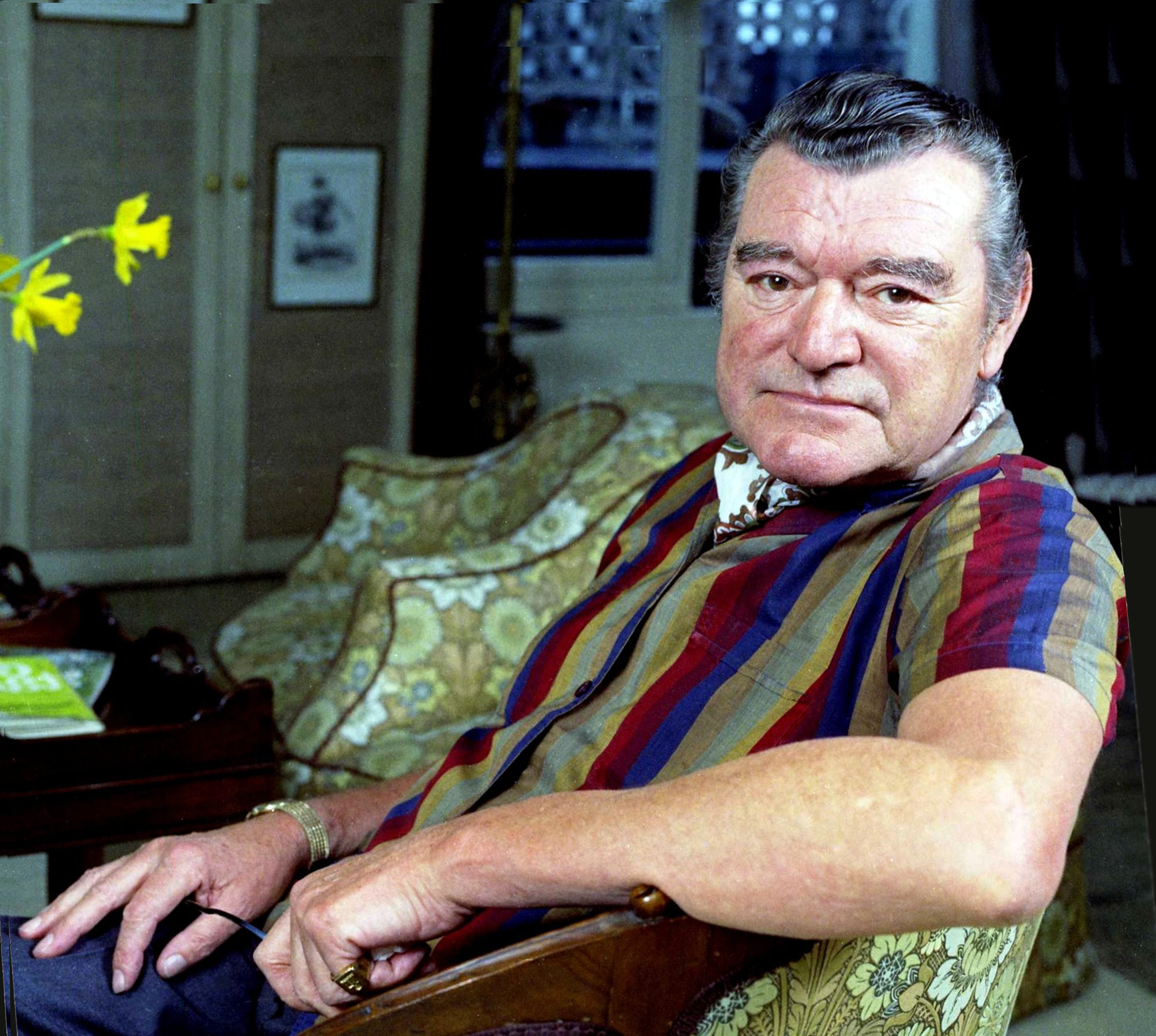
- Hawkins in 1973, photographed by Allan Warren
- Born: John Edward Hawkins; 14 September 1910; Wood Green, Middlesex, England
- Died: 18 July 1973 (aged 62); Chelsea, London, England
- Education: Italia Conti Academy of Theatre Arts
- Occupation: Actor
- Years active: 1923–1973
- Spouses: Jessica Tandy (m. 1932; div. 1940) Doreen Lawrence (m. 1947)
- Children: 4
- Military career
- Allegiance: United Kingdom
- Rank: Lieutenant (substantive); Colonel (honorary)
- Units: Royal Welch Fusiliers; ENSA

John Edward Hawkins (14 September 1910 – 18 July 1973) was an English actor, who worked on stage and in film from the 1930s until the 1970s. He was known for his portrayal of military men, said to "endow the countless figures of authority he played with a formidable screen presence." One of the most popular British film stars of the 1950s, he was nominated for four BAFTA Awards for Best British Actor.

== Biography ==
Hawkins was born at 45 Lyndhurst Road, Wood Green, in Middlesex (now London Borough of Haringey), the son of a builder. He was educated at Wood Green's Trinity County Grammar School, where, aged eight, he joined the school choir.

By the age of ten Hawkins had joined the local operatic society, and made his stage debut in Patience by Gilbert and Sullivan. His parents enrolled him in the Italia Conti Academy, and whilst he was studying there he made his London stage debut, when aged thirteen, playing the Elf King in Where the Rainbow Ends at the Holborn Empire on Boxing Day, December 1923, a production that also included the young Noël Coward. The following year, aged 14, he played the page in a production of Saint Joan by George Bernard Shaw. Five years later he was in a production of Beau Geste alongside Laurence Olivier.

He appeared on Broadway in Journey's End at the age of 18.

=== 1930s ===
In the 1930s Hawkins's focus was on the stage. He worked in the companies of Sybil Thorndike, John Gielgud and Basil Dean. His performances included Port Said by Emlyn Williams (1931), Below the Surface by HL Stoker and LS Hunt (1932), Red Triangle by Val Gielgud (1932), Service by CI Anthony, for director Basil Dean (1933), One of Us by Frank Howard, As You Like It by William Shakespeare (1933), and Iron Flowers by Cecil Lewis (1933, with Jessica Tandy his wife).

He started appearing in films, including Birds of Prey (1930), The Lodger (1932) (starring Ivor Novello), The Good Companions (1933), The Lost Chord (1933), I Lived with You (1933), The Jewel (1933), A Shot in the Dark (1933), and Autumn Crocus (1934).

In 1932 he was in a radio production of Hamlet with John Gielgud and Robert Donat and the following year he was in Danger. He was also in Death at Broadcasting House (1934), Lorna Doone (1934), and Peg of Old Drury (1935).

Stage roles included While Parents Sleep (1932) by Anthony Kimmins, Iron Mistress (1934) by Arthur Macrae; then an open air Shakespeare festival – As You Like It (1934) (with Anna Neagle), Twelfth Night (1934), and The Comedy of Errors (1934). Some of these productions were broadcast on radio. The Maitlands by Ronald Mackenzie (1934) was for John Gielgud's company. He was Horatio to Gielgud's Hamlet (1934). He also appeared in Accidentally Yours by Clifford Grey (1935), The World Waits by Clifford Hummel (1935), Coincidence by Bryce Robertson (1935) and The Frog (1935).

Films in the late 1930s included Beauty and the Barge (1937), The Frog (1937), (which Hawkins played on stage), Who Goes Next? (1938), A Royal Divorce (1938), Murder Will Out (1939), and The Flying Squad (1940).

Theatre appearances included A Winter's Tale (1937), Autumn by Margaret Kennedy and Gregory Ratoff (1937, with Flora Robson for Basil Dean), The King's Breakfast by Rita Welman and Maurice Marks (1937–38), No More Music by Rosamund Lehman (1938), Can We Tell? by Robert Gore Brown (1938), Traitors Gate by Norma Stuart (1938), and Dear Octopus by Dodie Smith (1938–39).

=== Second World War ===
Having attended an Officer Cadet Training Unit, he was commissioned into the Royal Welch Fusiliers, British Army, as a second lieutenant on 8 March 1941. On 22 January 1944, he transferred to the Expeditionary Force Institutes in the rank of lieutenant. He served with ENSA in India and Southeast Asia. He relinquished his commission as a lieutenant (substantive) on 11 October 1946, and was granted the honorary rank of colonel.

During his military service, he was employed by Ealing Studios to make The Next of Kin (1942).

=== Post-war career ===
Hawkins left the army in July 1946. Two weeks later he appeared on stage in The Apple Cart at £10 per week. The following year he starred in Othello, to a mixed reception.

Hawkins's wife became pregnant and he became concerned about his future. He decided to accept a contract with Sir Alexander Korda for three years at £50 per week. Hawkins had been recommended to Korda by the latter's production executive, Bill Bryden, who was married to Elizabeth Allen, who had worked with Hawkins.

The association began badly when Hawkins was cast in Korda's notorious flop Bonnie Prince Charlie (1948), as Lord George Murray. However, he followed it with a good role in the successful, highly acclaimed The Fallen Idol (1948), for Carol Reed. He appeared in The Small Back Room (1949), for Powell and Pressburger; he starred as the villain alongside Douglas Fairbanks Jr in the Sidney Gilliat directed State Secret (1950).

He was recruited by 20th Century Fox to support Tyrone Power and Orson Welles, by playing the Tristram Griffen character in the expensive epic The Black Rose (1950). He made another with Powell and Pressburger for Korda, The Elusive Pimpernel (1949).

Hawkins played the lead in The Adventurers (1951), shot in South Africa, then had a good role in another Hollywood-financed film shot in Britain, No Highway in the Sky (1951), with James Stewart. It was followed by a British thriller with Ralph Richardson, Home at Seven (1952).

In the spring of 1951 he went to Broadway and played Mercutio in a production of Romeo and Juliet with Olivia de Havilland.

=== Stardom ===
Hawkins became a star with the release of three successful films in which he played stern but sympathetic authority figures: Angels One Five (1951), as an RAF officer during the war; The Planter's Wife (1952), as a rubber planter combating communists in the Malayan Emergency (with Claudette Colbert); and Mandy (1952), as the headmaster of a school for the deaf. All films ranked among the top ten most popular films at the British box office in 1952 and British exhibitors voted him the fourth most popular British star at the local box office.

Hawkins starred in The Cruel Sea (1953), playing a driven naval officer in World War II. Sir Michael Balcon said: "Even before the script was written, we knew it had to be Jack Hawkins. If he hadn't been free to play the part, then there wouldn't have been a film." The Cruel Sea was the most successful film of the year and saw Hawkins voted the most popular star in Britain regardless of nationality.

According to his Guardian obituary, he "exemplified for many cinemagoers the stiff upper lip tradition prevalent in post-war British films. His craggy looks and authoritative bearing were used to good effect whatever branch of the services he represented."

Malta Story (1953) was another military story, with Hawkins as an RAF officer in the Siege of Malta during the war. It too was a hit, the ninth most popular film in Britain in 1953.

He had a guest role in Twice Upon a Time (1953) for Emeric Pressburger. He followed this with two mildly popular dramas – The Intruder (1953) and Front Page Story (1954).

The Seekers (1954) was partly shot in New Zealand and cast Hawkins in a rare romantic role. "My film wives to date usually stay home and knit, or else have conveniently died before the film starts," he said. It was followed by The Prisoner (1955), an unconventional drama, playing the shrewd interrogator in an authoritarian country who gets a respected priest (played by Alec Guinness) to discredit himself. None of these films was commercially successful but Hawkins was still voted the fifth biggest star at the British box office for 1954, and the most popular British one. "It's an enviable position, I know", said Hawkins. "But I have to be more careful now about the parts I choose, and it's hard not to offend people. Everyone thinks his own script is the best."

He turned down the role of Colonel Carne in The Glorious Gloucesters for Warwick Films, and Captain Cook for a project for the Rank organisation.

"I'm tired of playing decent fellows", he said in a 1954 interview, "with stiff upper lip and even stiffer morals. I'm going to kill them off before they kill me as an actor. And I want stories written for me, not rejects intended for other fellows... I just inherit them from other people. Often, I find they've left the name of the actor originally suggested for the role. Always the same old names ... Errol Flynn, Gregory Peck ... five or six others. Before the script reaches them, somebody remembers me – especially if it's one of those infernally nice characters."

=== International star ===
Hawkins got his wish when he received a Hollywood offer to play a pharaoh for Howard Hawks in Land of the Pharaohs (1955).

He returned home to make an Ealing comedy, Touch and Go (1955), which was not particularly popular. He was more comfortably cast as a police officer in The Long Arm (1956), and a test pilot in The Man in the Sky (1957). He was an insurance investigator in Sidney Gilliat's Fortune Is a Woman (1957).

Hawkins's career received a major boost when supporting William Holden and Alec Guinness in the highly acclaimed The Bridge on the River Kwai (1957).

He was appointed a Commander of the Order of the British Empire (CBE) in 1958.

Hawkins played the lead role in a film for John Ford, playing a police officer in Gideon's Day (USA title: Gideon of Scotland Yard) (1958). He had a good role as a double agent in a war film, The Two-Headed Spy (1958), then was given another third lead in a Hollywood blockbuster Ben-Hur (1959), playing the Roman admiral who befriends Charlton Heston. It was even more successful than Bridge on the River Kwai.

He appeared as one of The Four Just Men (1959) in the Sapphire Films TV series for ITV. He also played the lead in an American TV version of The Fallen Idol.

He appeared in a heist film considered ground-breaking at the time for its references to sex, and popular at the British box office, also providing Hawkins with his final lead role in The League of Gentlemen (1960).

However, though initially sought for the role of a gay barrister in Victim, he turned it down fearing that it might conflict with his masculine image. The role was eventually played by Dirk Bogarde.

=== Decline as star ===
A three-packet-a-day chain smoker, Hawkins began experiencing voice problems in the late 1950s; unbeknownst to the public, he had undergone cobalt treatment in 1959 for what was then described as a secondary condition of the larynx, but which was probably cancer.

Hawkins became worried about his voice and was concerned he would lose it. This caused him to take almost any work that was available. "I had to be realistic and take as much money as I could get while the going was good", he said. He played General Cornwallis in a European epic, La Fayette (1961). and appeared with Shirley MacLaine and Laurence Harvey in Two Loves (1961), and supported Rosalind Russell in Five Finger Exercise (1962).

"There are not all that number of mature leading men around", he said in a 1961 interview. "There seems to be a generation missing. I think people quit going into the acting profession. A lot of them drifted out during the war. And then when the war was over it was difficult for them to get back into the theatre."

He was in another big hit in Lawrence of Arabia (1962), as General Allenby. Rampage (1963) was less distinguished; he played an alcoholic priest in Zulu (1964). He had supporting parts in The Third Secret (1964), Guns at Batasi (1964), and Lord Jim (1965). Masquerade (1965) gave him a lead opposite Cliff Robertson. He made some appearances on US TV: "To Bury Caesar" with Pamela Brown in 1963 and "Back to Back" for The Bob Hope Theatre. He also appeared in Judith (1966), and The Poppy Is Also a Flower (1966).

=== Illness ===
In December 1965, Hawkins was diagnosed with throat cancer. His entire larynx was removed in January 1966. In March of that year he appeared at a royal screening of Born Free attended by the Queen and received a standing ovation.

Thereafter, his performances were dubbed, often (with Hawkins's approval) by Robert Rietti or Charles Gray. Hawkins continued to smoke after losing his voice. In private, he used a mechanical larynx to aid his speech.

In 1967, it was reported that he would direct Peter O'Toole in St Patrick's Battalion in Mexico but the film was not made. Instead he resumed his acting career, with his voice dubbed and dialogue kept to a minimum: Shalako (1968) and Great Catherine (1968). In Oh! What a Lovely War (1969), playing Emperor Franz Joseph I of Austria, he had no lines at all. He had an operation to restore his voice in 1968. It did not work: Hawkins could talk but only in a croaking voice.

"The fact that producers are still offering me work is a source of much gratitude to me", he said in 1969. "I flatter myself that when they cast me in a part it's me Jack Hawkins they want and not the person who was once Jack Hawkins... if you know what I mean. And I'm perfectly honest with anyone who hires me. I tell them exactly what they're letting themselves in for."

Some rare comedies followed: Monte Carlo or Bust (1969), Twinky (1970), The Adventures of Gerard (1970). There was more typical fare: Waterloo (1970), Jane Eyre (1970), The Beloved (1971), When Eight Bells Toll (1971), Nicholas and Alexandra (1971), and Kidnapped (1971).

The Last Lion (1972), shot in South Africa, offered him a rare lead. It was followed by Young Winston (1972), Escape to the Sun (1972), Theatre of Blood (1973), and Tales That Witness Madness (1973).

Hawkins also produced the film adaptation of Peter Barnes's The Ruling Class (1972), with Peter O'Toole and Alastair Sim.

== Personal life ==
Hawkins married actress Jessica Tandy in 1932, and the couple divorced in 1940. Together, they had one daughter, Susan Hawkins (1934–2004). In 1947, Hawkins married former actress Doreen Lawrence; together, they had three children, Caroline (b. 1955), Andrew (b. 1950), and Nicholas, and they remained married until his death in 1973.

=== Death ===
In May 1973, Hawkins had an experimental operation on his throat to insert an artificial voice box. He started haemorrhaging and was admitted to St Stephen's Hospital, Fulham Road, London, in June, forcing him to drop out of The Tamarind Seed (1974). In that film, Hawkins would have played a Russian general. He died on 18 July 1973, of a secondary haemorrhage. He was 62. He was cremated and his ashes interred at Golders Green Crematorium in north London.

His final appearance had been in the television mini-series QB VII. His autobiography, Anything for a Quiet Life, was published posthumously, on 26 November 1973.

== Filmography ==
- Birds of Prey (1930) as Alfred
- The Lodger (1932) as John Martin
- The Good Companions (1933) as Albert
- The Lost Chord (1933) as Sr. Jim Selby
- I Lived with You (1933) as Mort
- The Jewel (1933) as Peter Roberts
- A Shot in the Dark (1933) as Norman Paull
- Autumn Crocus (1934) as Alaric
- Death at Broadcasting House (1934) as Herbert Evans
- Lorna Doone (1934) as Member of the Court (uncredited)
- Peg of Old Drury (1935) as Michael O'Taffe
- Beauty and the Barge (1937) as Lt. Seton Boyne
- The Frog (1937) as Capt. Gordon
- Who Goes Next? (1938) as Capt. Beck
- A Royal Divorce (1938) as Capt. Charles
- Murder Will Out (1939) as Stamp
- The Flying Squad (1940) as Mark McGill
- The Next of Kin (1942) as Brigade Major Harcourt
- The Fallen Idol (1948) as Detective Ames
- Bonnie Prince Charlie (1948) as Lord George Murray
- The Small Back Room (1949) as R. B. Waring
- State Secret (1950) as Colonel Galcon
- The Black Rose (1950) as Tristram Griffen
- The Elusive Pimpernel (1949) as Prince of Wales / Footpad attacking Lord Anthony
- The Adventurers (1951) as Pieter Brandt
- No Highway in the Sky (1951) as Dennis Scott
- Home at Seven (1952) as Dr. Sparling
- Angels One Five (1952) as Group Capt. 'Tiger' Small
- Mandy (1952) as Dick Searle
- The Planter's Wife (1952) as Jim Frazer
- The Cruel Sea (1953) as Ericson
- Malta Story (1953) as Air Vice Marshal Frank
- Twice Upon a Time (1953) as Dr. Mathews
- The Intruder (1953) as Wolf Merton
- Front Page Story (1954) as Grant
- The Seekers (1954) as Phillip Wayne
- The Prisoner (1955) as the Interrogator
- Land of the Pharaohs (1955) as Pharaoh Khufu
- Touch and Go (1955) as Jim Fletcher
- The Long Arm (1956) as Detective-Superintendent Tom Halliday
- The Man in the Sky (1957) as John Mitchell
- Fortune Is a Woman (1957) as Oliver Branwell
- The Bridge on the River Kwai (1957) as Major Warden
- Gideon's Day (USA title: Gideon of Scotland Yard) (1958) as DCI George Gideon
- The Two-Headed Spy (1958) as Gen. Alex Schottland
- Ben-Hur (1959) as Quintus Arrius
- The League of Gentlemen (1960) as Col. Norman Hyde
- Lafayette (1961) as General Cornwallis
- Two Loves (1961) as William W.J. Abercrombie
- Five Finger Exercise (1962) as Stanley Harrington
- Lawrence of Arabia (1962) as General Edmund Allenby
- Rampage (1963) as Otto Abbot
- Zulu (1964) as Otto Witt
- The Third Secret (1964) as Sir Frederick Belline
- Guns at Batasi (1964) as Colonel Deal
- Lord Jim (1965) as Marlow
- Masquerade (1965) as Colonel Drexel
- Judith (1966) as Major Lawton
- The Poppy Is Also a Flower (1966) as General Bahar
- Stalked (short) (1968) as the Man
- Shalako (1968) as Sir Charles Daggett
- Great Catherine (1968) as the British Ambassador
- Oh! What a Lovely War (1969) as Emperor Franz Josef
- Monte Carlo or Bust! (1969) as Count Levinovitch
- Twinky (1970) as Judge Millington-Draper
- The Adventures of Gerard (1970) as Marshal Millefleurs
- Waterloo (1970) as General Sir Thomas Picton
- Jane Eyre (1970) as Mr. Brocklehurst
- The Beloved (1971) as Father Nicholas
- When Eight Bells Toll (1971) as Sir Anthony Skouras
- Nicholas and Alexandra (1971) as Count Fredericks
- Kidnapped (1971) as Captain Hoseason
- The Last Lion (1972) as Ryk Mannering
- Young Winston (1972) as Mr. Welldon
- Escape to the Sun (1972) as Baburin
- Theatre of Blood (1973) as Solomon Psaltery
- Tales That Witness Madness (1973) as Dr. Nicholas

== British box office ranking ==
During the 1950s, British exhibitors consistently voted Hawkins one of the most popular local stars in the country in the annual poll conducted by the Motion Picture Herald:

- 1952 – 4th most popular British star
- 1953 – most popular international star
- 1954 – 5th most popular international star, most popular British star
- 1955 – 6th most popular British star
- 1956 – 2nd most popular British star
- 1957 – 9th most popular British star
- 1958 – 9th most popular British star
