= Robert Burnard (actor) =

English stage and radio actor

- Born: Robert Sabine Burnard; 1902; England
- Died: 8 November 1950 (aged 47–48); Melbourne, Victoria, Australia
- Occupation: Actor

Raoul Sabine "Robert" Burnard (c. 1902 – 8 November 1950) was an English stage and radio actor best known for starring in several Crawford Productions radio plays in Australia. He was Sabine Baring-Gould's grandson.. He was Christened by his grandfather in Lew Trenchard, Devon, England.

Burnard attended Haileybury College and Cambridge University, after which he worked with the diplomatic corps in China, Persia, and Japan. A graduate of the Royal Academy of Dramatic Art, he co-starred with Marie Tempest and Maurice Moscovitch in the West End theatre. He later went to Hollywood and served as an assistant director to Eric von Stroheim. In Australia, he worked with Crawford Productions and played lead characters, including the Toff, in several radio plays over 3DB. Another character he played was Sylvanus Haythorpe, from Old English by John Galsworthy.

He died at Arthur Seat, Victoria, Australia.
