= Tansy (given name) =

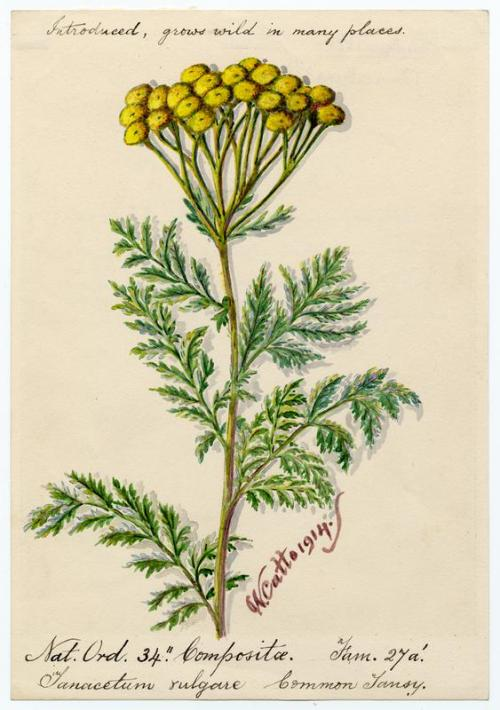
- Common tansy by William Catto, 1914.
- Pronunciation: English: /tænzi/
- Gender: Feminine
- Language: English via Old French and Greek

Origin
- Meaning: "Tansy”

Other names
- Variant forms: Tansie, Tanzie, Tanzy
- Related names: Athanasia, Athanasios, Athanasius

Tansy is an English feminine given name derived from the name of the flowering plant. The plant name is derived from the Old French word tanesie, from the Greek athanasia, meaning "immortality." It has been in occasional use in the Anglosphere since the 19th century along with other botanical names that came into fashion during the Victorian era.

== Women ==
- Tansy Davies (born 1973), English composer
- Tansy Rayner Roberts (born 1978), Australian fantasy writer

== Fictional characters ==
- Tansy, a character in The Divide trilogy by Elizabeth Kay
- Tansy, a character in the 2003 buddy action comedy film Kangaroo Jack
- Tansy Bestigui, a character in the 2013 crime fiction novel The Cuckoo's Calling by J.K. Rowling, writing as Robert Galbraith
- Tansy Carr, a character in the 1961 British comedy film No My Darling Daughter
- Tansy Firle, a character in the 1914 novel Tansy by English writer Tickner Edwardes and the 1921 British silent film based on the popular novel
- Tansy Meadow, a character in the BBC soap opera EastEnders
- Tansy McGinnis, a character in the play The Nerd
- Tansy Taylor, a character in the 1962 British horror film Night of the Eagle
- Tansy Truitt, a character in the American television series Hart of Dixie
