= Burpham =

Village and parish in West Sussex, England

Coordinates: 50.870°N 0.525°W

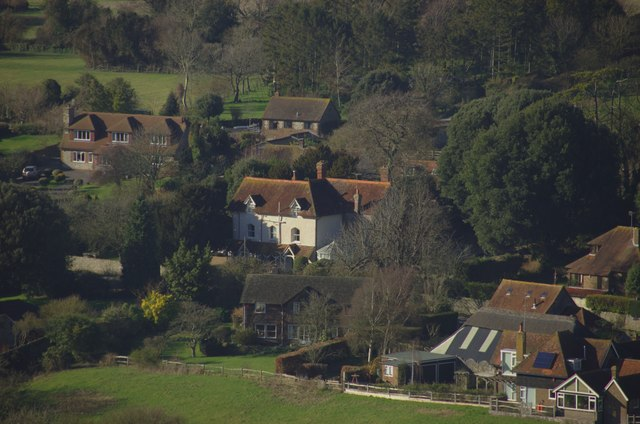
- Burpham Village from Perry Hill

- Location within West Sussex
- Area: 12.38 km^{2} (4.78 sq mi)
- Population: 145 (Civil Parish.2011)
  - Density: 12/km^{2} (31/sq mi)
- OS grid reference: TQ039089
  - London: 47 miles (76 km) NNE
- Civil parish: Burpham
- District: Arun
- Shire county: West Sussex
- Region: South East
- Country: England
- Sovereign state: United Kingdom
- Post town: Arundel
- Postcode district: BN18
- Dialling code: 01903
- Police: Sussex
- Fire: West Sussex
- Ambulance: South East Coast
- UK Parliament: Arundel and South Downs

Burpham is a rural village and civil parish in the Arun District of West Sussex, England. The village is on an arm of the River Arun slightly less than 2 miles (3.2 km) northeast of Arundel.

A slight minority of the population qualifies as within the working age.

Wepham is a rural hamlet in the parish about 1.7 miles (2.7 km) northeast of Arundel on the road between Burpham and Warningcamp.

== History ==
The surrounding area has yielded Iron Age and Neolithic remains. The bones, a tusk and some grinders of an elephant were found near Peppering Farm in 1820.

The village is next to the site of a Saxon Burh (an Old English term for "fortification") with earthworks to protect against Viking attack up the River Arun. It is one of a series of burhs ordered by Alfred the Great or his successor, Edward the Elder in about AD 900 and listed in the Burghal Hidage. Burpham's toponym is derived from burh.

The Church of England parish church of Saint Mary is of Saxon origin. It has a lepers' window by which lepers could watch the Mass. English Heritage lists the building as a Grade I listed building.

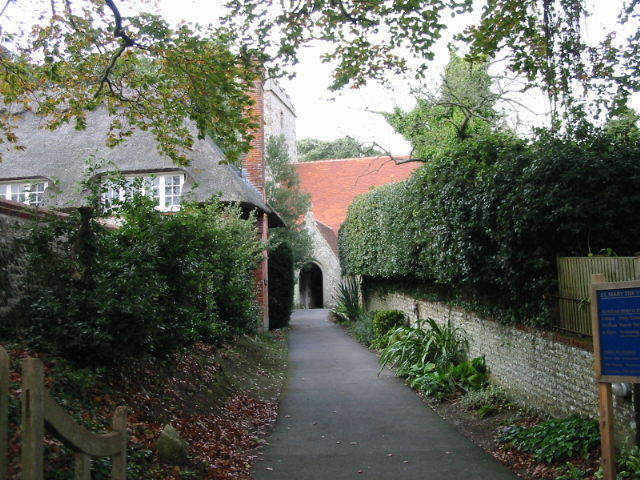
A path through the village

Burpham has one main street, mainly of thatched Sussex flint cottages.

Burpham has a rich literary history. Mervyn Peake and his family lived here and he walked the South Downs while devising the fantasy characters of Gormenghast. Mervyn Peake is buried at St Mary's Church, Burpham.

John Cowper Powys moved to Burpham with his wife Margaret in 1902 and wrote warmly of Burpham in his Autobiography (1934). His son Littleton Alfred Powys was born in the village later that year and subsequently grew up living with his mother whilst John Cowper Powys toured America delivering public lectures and writing. The Rev. Tickner Edwardes, who lived in what is now the Burpham Country House Hotel, when Vicar of Burpham, was a noted naturalist, and wrote many books including The Lore of the Honey-Bee, as well as authoring romantic novels and early films of the 1920s such as Tansy, the story of a love triangle between a village girl and two brothers. A blue plaque on the building commemorates him. Both Peake and Edwardes are buried in St. Mary's churchyard. Like Gilbert White of Selbourne, Edwardes combined his role as priest with his love and knowledge of the natural world. As Vicar he encountered one Harold Dexter, leader of a Boys' Club from Mitcham in Surrey who were camped nearby. Harold was interested in bees; finding that the Vicar shared his interest he asked the Vicar whether he had come across a remarkable book on bee culture by a man named Tickner Edwardes. Replied the Vicar: I am Tickner Edwardes.

== Amenities ==
Burpham has views across the Arun and its water meadows towards Arundel Castle, Arundel Cathedral and Arundel Priory. The village has a century-old cricket pitch. There is one public house, The George at Burpham, which at one time held an AA Rosette as a gastropub.
