= Burghal Hidage =

Deed

A map of places named in the Burghal Hidage

The Burghal Hidage (/ˈbɜːrɡəl ˈhaɪdɪdʒ/) is an Anglo-Saxon document providing a list of over thirty fortified places (burhs), the majority being in the ancient Kingdom of Wessex, and the taxes (recorded as numbers of hides) assigned for their maintenance. The document, so named by Frederic William Maitland in 1897, survives in two versions of medieval and early modern date. Version A, Cotton Otho B.xi was badly damaged in a fire at Ashburnham House in Westminster in 1731, but the body of the text survives in a transcript made by the antiquary Laurence Nowell in 1562. Version B survives as a composite part of seven further manuscripts, usually given the title De numero hydarum Anglie in Britannia. There are several discrepancies in the lists recorded in the two versions of the document: Version A includes references to Burpham, Wareham and Bridport but omits Shaftesbury and Barnstaple which are listed in Version B. Version B also names Worcester and Warwick in an appended list.

The Burghal Hidage offers a detailed picture of the network of burhs that Alfred the Great designed to defend his kingdom from the predations of Viking invaders.

== Burhs and hides ==
After his victory over the Danes at the Battle of Edington (878) and the departure of another Viking army from Fulham in 880, Alfred the Great set about building a system of fortified towns or forts, known as burhs, in response to the Viking threat. These burhs included former Roman towns (where stone walls were repaired and perimeter ditches sometimes added), temporary forts and substantial new towns.

In the first half of the 10th century, Alfred's son Edward the Elder and his successors made this type of construction a key element in their campaigns against the Vikings, who had been in control of much of Danelaw. This culminated in the eventual creation of a unified Kingdom of England.

In the event of Danish attacks, the provision of fortified towns was a place of refuge for the Anglo-Saxon rural population who lived within a 15-mile (24 km) radius of each town. They also provided secure regional market centres and from around 973 the coinage was reminted every six or seven years by moneyers in about sixty of the burhs.

In early Anglo-Saxon England the hide was used as the basis for assessing the amount of food rent due from an area (known as feorm). Initially the size of the hide varied according to value and resources of the land itself. Over time the hide became the unit on which all public obligation was assessed; as well as food rent, the manning and maintenance of the walls of a burh and the amount of geld payable was based on the hide. Tenants had a threefold obligation related to their landholding; the so-called ‘common burdens' of military service, fortress work, and bridge repair. Later the hide was given a set acreage and in the Domesday book the most common size in use was 120 acres (48.56 ha; 0.19 sq mi). However some areas such as Dorset and Wiltshire used units based on 40 acres (16.19 ha; 0.06 sq mi) to 48 acres (19.42 ha; 0.08 sq mi).

In wartime, five hides were expected to provide one fully armed soldier in the king's service, and one man from every hide was to provide garrison duty for the burhs and to help in their initial construction and upkeep. The continued maintenance of the burhs, as well as ongoing garrison duty, was also probably supplied by those inhabitants of the new burhs which were planned by the king as new towns. In this way the economic and military functions of the larger burhs were closely interlinked. The hide also served as a unit of fiscal assessment for the collection of a tax, known as Danegeld, for which the original purpose was to raise money to buy off raiding Vikings; however after that threat had retreated it was retained as a permanent land-tax.

== Origins of the document ==
The document probably dates from after 914 during the reign of Alfred's son, Edward the Elder. This assumes that it was compiled as part of the preparations for Edward the Elder's campaign against the Danes in 917. The list identifies 30 burhs in Wessex, two in Mercia and one in Hwicce. The view that the Burghal Hidage is of early 10th-century date is based on the inclusion of Buckingham and Oxford, two settlements that were sited in Mercia not Wessex, and according to the Anglo-Saxon Chronicle, Buckingham was created as a burh by Edward the Elder in 918. The Chronicle also reports that Edward the Elder took possession of London and Oxford in 910; Buckingham being situated between the two would have also been included. It is possible that the Burghal Hideage was created as a blue-print for the way that burhs were connected with hidation, originally worked out in Wessex, and applied to the situation in Mercia at that time. This received view has now been challenged from two directions – from the perspectives of the strategies involved, and a new interpretation of the coinage of King Alfred.

The order of citation of the individual burhs in the document, in a clockwise circuit around Wessex rather than on a shire by shire basis, indicates that at the time of the original composition of the document all the burhs were seen as being part of a single system. The defining characteristic of this system is that these fortified sites would have all been built at one occasion to serve a single strategic end, in that the functions of all the individual components of the system complemented the functions of each of the others. It follows that it cannot have originated, for instance, as a core number to which others were added at a later date. By the early 10th century this system was already long out of date and overtaken by events. It is not likely therefore to have survived as a viable and effective system to be recorded as such in the Burghal Hidage after 914. There would, furthermore, have been no reason to add Buckingham to a system which by 914 was already redundant in the rapidly evolving political situation of the times. There are therefore good grounds for suggesting that the system (and therefore the document which describes it) is considerably earlier in date.

== Political and military context ==
It has long been recognised that the system of burhs recorded in the Burghal Hidage was the creation of King Alfred, the received view being that they were in place by the time of the second Viking invasions in the 890s (based on the evidence in the Anglo-Saxon Chronicle of the existence of garrisons in many of them by this time), and that most of them were constructed in the 880s. However, the fact that nearly half the number of hides in the system were allocated to burhs on the northern border of Wessex with Mercia suggests a context for the creation of this system in the period when Mercia was occupied and controlled by the Vikings. This was the situation in the period from 874, when the Vikings at Repton installed Ceolwulf (II) as king of Mercia to replace Burgred. The most probable context on strategic grounds is in the short period between 877 and 879, when Mercia was partitioned between Ceolwulf and Guthrum. The creation of this system by King Alfred can therefore best be seen as both an in-depth defence of Wessex against possible invasion of Viking forces (such as indeed happened in the period 875-early 878), and as a strategic offensive against the Vikings who controlled Mercia and London at that time.

Work on the minting patterns of the coinage of the period has shown that King Alfred was in control of London and the surrounding area until about 877, exactly the time when the Vikings are recorded as partitioning Mercia and taking control of its eastern extent. Thereafter the coins minted in London are only in the name of the Mercian king Ceolwulf. After his decisive defeat of the Vikings at the Battle of Edington in early 878, Alfred was once again able to take the offensive. His victory must have earned him wide acclaim. It is this juncture which seems the most appropriate time for the start of the planning and construction of the system of burhs recorded in the Burghal Hidage. Throughout 878 Guthrum's Vikings were in control of Mercia and, arguably, London, with his base in Cirencester. The creation of burhs at Oxford and Buckingham at this time fits in with the likelihood that Alfred was able to regain control of this area which he had exercised before being deprived of it as a result of the Viking partition of 877, and their siting demonstrates that he was able to initiate a strategic offensive against the Vikings in Eastern Mercia and London. Alfred's standing enabled him to impose a level of conscription on the population of his kingdom to construct the burhs, to act as garrisons behind their defences, and to serve in his new army. Based on the figures provided by the hideage the size of Alfred's conscript army can be deduced. One man per hide would be the equivalent of 27,000 men, whereas one man per 5 hides of land would give 5,500 men. Alfreds practice was to divide his field army into two or three, so with additional support from the royal household troops and those of the leading nobility would provide Alfred with enough manpower to deal with any Viking attacks.

The retreat of Guthrum and his band to East Anglia in late 879 and the similar retreat of the Viking army stationed at Fulham, west of London, back to the Continent at the same time (both events recorded in the Anglo-Saxon Chronicle), can be seen as a tactical response to the effectiveness of the strategic offensive posed by the construction of the Burghal system. The ratification of a mutually agreed boundary to the east of London, in Alfred and Guthrum's Treaty, between Guthrum's new Viking kingdom of East Anglia and Alfred's newly won territory, can best be ascribed to this time. These developments gave Alfred control of London and its surrounding territory, which included a good length of the strategically important Watling Street as it approached London. This interpretation is supported by the issue at this time of the special celebratory London Monogram coinage from the London mint, now under the control of Alfred, and by the issue at the same time of coins from Oxford and Gloucester in southern Mercia.

The fact that the Burghal Hidage does not include London, only taken in late 879; that many of the burhs recorded in the document were of a temporary nature and were only replaced by more permanent fortified sites later on; and that its organisation reflects a strategic offensive against the Viking presence in Mercia and London, are factors which argue strongly that the Burghal Hidage is a prescriptive list describing a system which was in process of being planned and implemented before late 879. It is therefore likely to have originated in a context in which the logistics of the system and the means for its implementation and support were being worked out in practice on the ground. The fact that the construction of a burh at Buckingham by Alfred can be logically placed within this strategic scheme at this period (878-9), removes the necessity of having to place the creation of the original version of the Burghal Hidage after the first documentary mention of Buckingham in 914. Its composition can therefore be most appropriately placed in a West Saxon context, rather than one which relates to the formation of burhs and shires in Mercia in the early 10th century – to which situation it has no relevance.

In Wessex a number of the burhs which were part of the system recorded in the Burghal Hidage, and which were merely fortresses rather than fortified towns, were in many cases replaced at a later date by larger fortresses which were fortified towns. The received view of the date of this process is that this took place in the 920s or 930s during the reign of King Athelstan. More recently, arguments have been given which places these changes in the reign of Alfred, possibly in the 890s in response to the new Viking invasions. Examples of this process can be seen in the replacement of Pilton by Barnstaple, and Halwell by Totnes and Kingsbridge in Devon.

== List of burhs ==
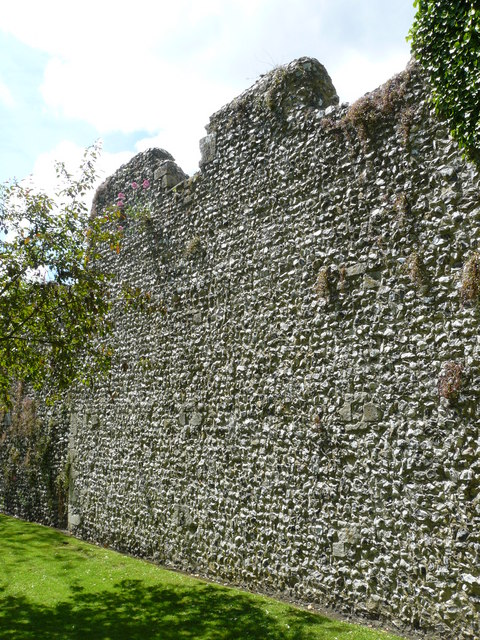
The walled defence around a burh: Alfred's capital, Winchester. Saxon and medieval work on Roman foundations

This list shows the 33 burhs (with hidages) included in either or both of the 'A' and the 'B' groups of manuscripts as discussed by David Hill, in the order that they appear in all of the documents. Burhs that were probably added to the document group 'B' after Alfred's time are shown in bold.

Burh	Hidage
Eorpeburnan	324
Hastings	500
Lewes	1300
Burpham	720
Chichester	1500
Portchester	500
Southampton	150
Winchester	2400
Wilton	1400
Chisbury	700
Shaftesbury	700
Twynam (now called Christchurch)	470
Wareham	1600
Bridport	760
Exeter	734
Halwell	300
Lydford	140
Pilton	360
Watchet	513
Axbridge	400
Lyng	100
Langport	600
Bath	1000
Malmesbury	1200
Cricklade	1500
Oxford	1400
Wallingford	2400
Buckingham	1600
Sashes Island	1000
Eashing	600
Southwark	1800
**Worcester**	1200
**Warwick**	2400

== Comparison of the various manuscripts ==
The Burgal Hidage survives in two versions of medieval and early modern date. Version A, Cotton Otho B.xi was badly damaged in a fire at Ashburnham House in 1731 but the body of the text survives thanks to a transcript made by the Tudor historian Laurence Nowell in 1562. Version B survives as a part of seven further manuscripts, usually given the title De numero hydarum Anglie in Britannia. There are several discrepancies in the lists recorded in the two versions of the document: Version A includes references to Burpham, Wareham and Bridport but omits Shaftesbury and Barnstaple which are listed in Version B. Version B also names Worcester and Warwick in an appended list.

There have been some problems with the Nowell transcription. However modern scholars have compared Nowell's transcription of other manuscripts, where the originals are still available, enabling a picture of the conventions Nowell used to be built. This model was then applied in the correction of his transcription of the Burghal Hidage Ortho manuscript. It seems that Nowell did not understand the subtlety of the phonetics of the Anglo-Saxon written language and would therefore substitute, using his knowledge of Elizabethan grammar, what he saw as an equivalent letter, thus giving the Anglo-Saxon word a completely different sound and meaning. Other issues included for example, the original scribes' use of an open Old English "a" which Nowell incorrectly copied as a "u".

The texts in the Version A and Cotton Otho B.xi are sufficiently similar to show that ultimately they do derive from one source. The historian David Hill shows how all of the recensions can be used to correct each other or at least help us understand how errors, especially in the hidage numbers, were mistranscribed in the copying process. Hill argues that these errors are not conflicts of facts or derive from differing lists, but simply errors in copying from a common source; it is possible to see that this was because lines of the text were being missed. However, as noted above, the ‘B’ recensions do not list Burpham, Wareham and Bridport, it is likely that their common archetype must have missed them also. Yet it too must have contained the ‘grand total’ sentence at the end which is flatly contradicted by the hidages enumerated.

After listing all the burghs Version A of the Burghal Hidage includes a note:

"For the maintenance and defence of an acre’s breadth of wall sixteen hides are required. If every hide is represented by one man, then every pole of wall can be manned by four men. Then for the maintenance of twenty poles of wall eighty hides are required ..."

There follows a series calculations and multiples then continues:

"If the circuit is greater, the additional amount can easily be deduced from this account, for 160 men are always required for 1 furlong, then every pole of wall is manned by 4 men”.

Hill argues that this is back to front: the hidage assessment for a burh should provide a wall-length. He advances his argument to propose that the intention of the Burghal Hidage is to provide a method of doing so not for Wessex but for the newly created burh in the reconquered ‘shires’ of Mercia. Perhaps this is what that formula means attached to ‘A’. Yet if we regard the archetype of ‘B’ as earlier than the end text of this says as follows:

“That is all 27 and 70 which belong to it; and 30 to the West Saxons. And to Worcester 1200 hides. To Warwick four and 2400 hides”.

One of the ‘B’ variants (Hill ‘6’) has a copyist's gloss which proposes a meaning of ‘27,000 and 70 hides’ to make sense of the “27 and 70” reference: the “belong to it” refers to the entire list enumerated, a grand total. However, none of the ‘B’ lists can give us that total as they miss out between three and five burh. Therefore, the archetype of ‘B’ must have included these, as did that of ‘A’. However, by recalculating the mistranscriptions and supplying the missing burh figures from ‘A’ then the ‘restored’ total would be 28,671. Hill then turns to the second part of the final sentence “and 30 to the West Saxons”, this too is glossed as ‘30,000’ by the copyist ‘6’ so that it seems to refer to hides; but Hill proposes that it refers to the 30 burh; there are in fact 31 of these in the combined lists, but he then proposes that Buckingham (at 1600 hides) is in fact Mercian, that is not of “the West Saxons”, so is not included in the grand total. The adjusted total of 27,071 then concurs with the final ‘B’ sentence/statement.

Therefore, ‘A’ and ‘B’ were copied from the same archetype/s as they agree on the grand total (less 1600 for Buckingham), yet differ only in their final sentence/statements as to what the figures demonstrate, a formula for manpower or a total of hidage. This is important because it evidentially contradicts any proposal that the recensions had burh added or subtracted to reflect ‘new’ or ‘abandoned’ burh. The ‘B’ archetype is more likely to be closer to the ultimate source which would be an ‘exchequer/ treasury’ document. ‘A’/ Cotton-Otho would have been prepared from it to perform the function Hill proposes, the burh/ shiring of the reconquered areas. But, surely the final sentence/statement of ‘B’ “And to Worcester 1200 hides. To Warwick four and 2400 hides” which Hill proposes as being about the proposed organisation of the new Mercian ‘shires’ should actually, if it meant such, would actually be more congruent if appended to the formulae following ‘A’.

== See also ==
- Fyrd
- Anglo-Saxon England
- History of the English borough
