= Rescued by Rover =

- Rover and the baby, played by Blair the dog and Barbara Hepworth.
- Directed by: Cecil Hepworth; Lewin Fitzhamon
- Written by: Margaret Hepworth
- Starring: Blair; May (as Mabel) Clark; Barbara Hepworth; Cecil Hepworth; Margaret Hepworth; Sebastian Smith; Lindsay Gray
- Production company: Hepworth Picture Plays
- Distributed by: American Mutoscope and Biograph Co.
- Release date: 1905
- Country: United Kingdom
- Language: Silent
- Budget: £7, 13 shillings, and ninepence

Rescued by Rover is a 1905 British short silent drama film, directed by Lewin Fitzhamon, about a dog who leads its master to his kidnapped baby, which was the first to feature the Hepworth's family dog Blair in a starring role; following the release, the dog became a household name and he is considered to be the first dog film star. The film, which according to Michael Brooke of BFI Screenonline, "marks a key stage in the medium's development from an amusing novelty to the seventh art," and, "possibly the only point in film history when British cinema unquestionably led the world," was an advance in filming techniques, editing, production and story telling.

Four hundred prints were sold, so many that the negatives wore out twice, requiring the film to be re-shot each time. Two professional actors were paid to appear, and the film is cited as the first film to have used paid actors. The style of shooting and editing would bridge the gap between the styles of directors Edwin Stanton Porter and D. W. Griffith, and prints have been preserved in both the United States and the United Kingdom.

== Plot ==
Rescued by Rover (1905)

The film opens with Rover, a collie playing with a child in front of a fireplace. Later that day, the baby is taken out in a pram by her nurse. The nurse refuses to aid a gipsy beggar woman, and is then distracted upon meeting a soldier. While talking to the soldier, she pays no attention to the baby, and the beggar woman approaches from behind and snatches the sleeping child.

In the next scene, the nurse confesses to the mother that the child has been lost. Rover, also sitting in the room, listens before jumping through the window and racing down the street, going around a corner and across a river. The dog makes its way to a slum and barges through each and every door; he finds the right one and enters. In an attic, the beggar woman is removing the clothing from the child; the dog enters and is driven off by the beggar.

The dog leaves the house and swims back across the river, down the street and into its master and mistress's home. In a study, the child's father is sitting; Rover enters and pleads with him to follow. They leave, with the man following the dog across the river in a boat to the slums. They enter the room where the child is hidden, and the father quickly takes the child from the beggar woman and leaves with the dog. Upon their return home, the child is placed in the arms of the mother, while Rover prances happily around them.

== Cast ==
- Blair as Rover the dog
- Barbara Hepworth as Baby
- Cecil Hepworth as Father
- Margaret Hepworth as Mother
- May Clark as Nursemaid
- Lindsay Gray as Gypsy woman
- Sebastian Smith as Soldier

== Production ==
Rescued by Rover was predominantly a family affair – Cecil Hepworth's wife, Margaret, wrote the scenario and played the role of the mother on screen. Hepworth himself directed, painted the scenery and acted as the father. Their child was the baby on screen, and the part of Rover was played by the family dog, Blair. Two professional actors were paid to appear, Sebastian Smith as the soldier, and his wife Lindsay Gray as the old woman who stole the baby. The two actors were paid half a guinea each; Hepworth would recall "We couldn't get them for less". The film is often cited as the first film to have used paid actors. Completing the cast was May Clark, who had previously played Alice in Hepworth's version of Alice in Wonderland, as the child's nurse. Clark was also the cutting room assistant.

The movie was so successful that Hepworth had to re-shoot the entire film twice. The first two negatives wore out in meeting the demand for prints.

== Release ==
Rescued by Rover is often considered to be the United Kingdom's first major fiction film. Released in 1905, some four hundred prints were sold at a price of £8 each, and they circulated for at least four or five years. The character of Rover the dog, played by Hepworth's family dog Blair, became a household name and is considered the world's first canine film star. This first appearance of a dog in a narrative based film caused the uncommon name of Rover to become popular for dogs.

=== Legacy ===
Previous films by Hepworth and his company had been considered a continuation of the cinema of attractions. The first few years of the 20th century were a period in which many film-makers began placing a higher emphasis on portraying a narrative story, and lesser so more on the image and the ability to show something. The film is considered a step forward in both film grammar and structure. Contemporary audiences may find it rather hoary, although one scholar has noted the format would be familiar to fans of the dog character Lassie.

It gave rise to a number of other chase films centred on animals, including Lewin Fitzhamon's later film Dumb Sagacity (1907). Rescued by Rover has parallels with D. W. Griffith's debut film The Adventures of Dollie (1908).

Rescued by Rover contains more than twenty shots; this is a considerable advance when compared with Hepworth's own How it Feels to be Run Over (1900), which contains a single shot. This not only made the film longer, but demonstrated that advances in film language could be made in editing as well as shooting. Additionally, the editing of Rescued by Rover is notable in its use of time contractions, which made Rover's journeys take considerably less time by portrayal than they would have in reality.

In linking these shots together, Hepworth attempted to avoid the confusion of earlier multi-shot films such as Edwin S. Porter's The Great Train Robbery (1903). Three shots are used to set up the plot, that of the baby being stolen by a beggar woman. Nearly all of the following shots show Rover tracking down the child. When the dog returns home, the shots' settings are repeated in reverse as the dog travels them; they are shown again in the original order, for a third time, when the dog brings the father. A fourth repetition is, rather radically for its time, spared by showing the kidnapper's return to her room followed by a shot of the reunited family.

With its form and structure in consideration, Rescued by Rover shows a growing understanding among directors of how stories can be told on film; that is, the belief that the audience does not need to see the family return to their home, but will instead assume this occurred while the beggar woman was returning to her hovel. While the duration of the shot does not correspond with the time necessary for the father and the family dog to travel back, it also does not affect the sense of realistic on-screen representation.

Also, cinematographic improvements that modern viewers would find relatively minor were noted in their day. In the attic scenes, for instance, Hepworth's use of arc lights was celebrated for being an early use of harsh lighting conditions to create ambiance and indicate a dangerous setting.

== Preservation ==
Prints of Rescued by Rover have been saved both in the Library of Congress film archive and the National Film and Television Archive of the British Film Institute.

== See also ==
- History of film
- List of animal films
