= How It Feels to Be Run Over =

- Directed by: Cecil M. Hepworth
- Produced by: Cecil M. Hepworth
- Starring: May Clark; Cecil M. Hepworth
- Cinematography: Cecil M. Hepworth
- Edited by: Cecil M. Hepworth
- Production company: Hepworth Manufacturing Company
- Release date: July 1900
- Running time: 1 minute
- Country: United Kingdom
- Language: Silent Film

How It Feels to Be Run Over is a one-minute British silent trick film, made in 1900, and directed by Cecil M. Hepworth. As in other instances of the very earliest films, the film presents the audience with the images of a shocking experience, without further narrative exposition.

== Plot summary ==
How It Feels to Be Run Over (1900)

A coach is coming, and moves out of the frame at one side of the field of view. Soon after, an approaching car veers off course and moves straight to the viewer (the camera). As it approaches, the occupants wave frantically, hoping to stave off the impending collision. At the moment the car fills the entire frame the film cuts to title cards that bear the text "Oh, mother will be pleased".

== Cast ==
- Cecil Hepworth as Driver
- May Clark as Passenger
- Several actors as passengers

== Missing Intertitle ==
In the original film, the intertitle says, "Oh, mother will be pleased". When the footage was found, it was missing the "Mother" intertitle. It just read, "Oh, will be pleased."

== See also ==
- Explosion of a Motor Car, another 1900 Hepworth film involving an automobile
