= Lewin Fitzhamon =

British film director (1869–1961)

- Born: 5 June 1869
- Died: 10 October 1961 (aged 92)

Lewin "Fitz" Fitzhamon (5 June 1869 – 10 October 1961) was a British filmmaker, who worked as Cecil Hepworth's principal director in the early decades of the twentieth century. His best-known film is Rescued by Rover (1905). Other directing credits include An Englishman Trip to Paris from London (1904), That Fatal Sneeze (1907), The Man and his Bottle (1908) and A New Hat for Nothing (1910). In total, he directed around 400 films.

== Early career ==
Lewis Henry Dell Fitzhamon was born on 5 June 1869, the son of the Rector of Aldingham. He received his early education at Rossall School but was forced to receive home tuition when, having contracted diphtheria and rheumatic fever, he was unable to return to school.

Fitzhamon began his career as a music hall performer. He became involved in filmmaking in 1900, working with film pioneer Robert W. Paul. He gained experience in both directing and acting, with credits in films such as Briton vs. Boer (1900).

== Career with Hepworth ==
Cecil Hepworth recruited Fitzhamon as a stage manager in 1904, to replace Percy Stow, who had left to establish his own film company, Clarendon. One of the first film he directed in 1904 was An Englishman Trip to Paris from London, a precursor of travel films, where the main actor was filmed on location in London and Paris. Fitzhamon continued working with Hepworth until 1912, gaining writing, acting and directing credits. One of his most popular films was Rescued by Rover (1905). Fitzhamon loved animals, producing many other films with an animal in a heroic role, such as Dog Outwits the Kidnappers and Dumb Sagacity.

He directed Prehistoric Peeps (1905), the first depiction of onscreen dinosaurs in film history, portrayed by actors inside pantomime models.

That Fatal Sneeze (1907)

Fitzhamon, like Hepworth, had an interest in special effects, producing many "trick films", including Sister Mary Jane's Top Note (1907) and The Man and his Bottle (1908). Luke McKernan has described how many of his films had "no concern except to get the central trick effect or plot idea across, but their very lack of pretension makes for pleasurable viewing now". He had a wide and varied output, covering westerns, fantasy films, comedies, chase films and melodramas.

== Later career ==
In 1912, Fitzhamon established his own film company, Fitz Films. He also worked as a freelance director, for various producers. He published two novels: The Rival Millionaires (1904) and The Vixen (1915).
