= Dr. Trimball's Verdict =

1913 film

Dr. Trimball's Verdict was a silent horror movie produced by Cecil Hepworth in 1913.

== Plot ==
A doctor kills his rival and dies of shock on seeing him materialise on a purchased skeleton.

== Cast ==
- Alec Worcester as Dr. Trimball
- Chrissie White as Alice
