= Norman Whitten =

British actor and filmmaker (1881–1969)

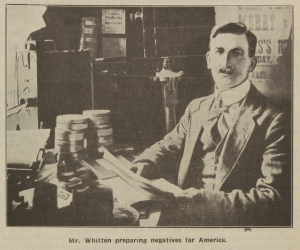
- Born: Norman Hughes Chaplen Whitten; 20 October 1881
- Died: 3 March 1969 (aged 87)
- Occupations: Silent film actor Producer; Director

Norman Hughes Chaplen Whitten (20 October 1881 – 3 March 1969) was an English silent film producer, director and actor and the first actor to play the Mad Hatter in film, which he did in the 1903 film Alice in Wonderland, the first film adaptation of Lewis Carroll's 1865 children's book Alice's Adventures in Wonderland. In 1907 he married May Clark, who had played Alice. A pioneer of early film in Ireland, Whitten made newsreels, light comedies and dramas and Ireland's first animated film.

== Early life ==
Whitten was born in Brompton in London in 1881, one of six children of Sarah Ann née Chaplen (1849–1906) and Dr. William John Whitten (1846–1891), a medical practitioner and surgeon.

== Hepworth Company ==
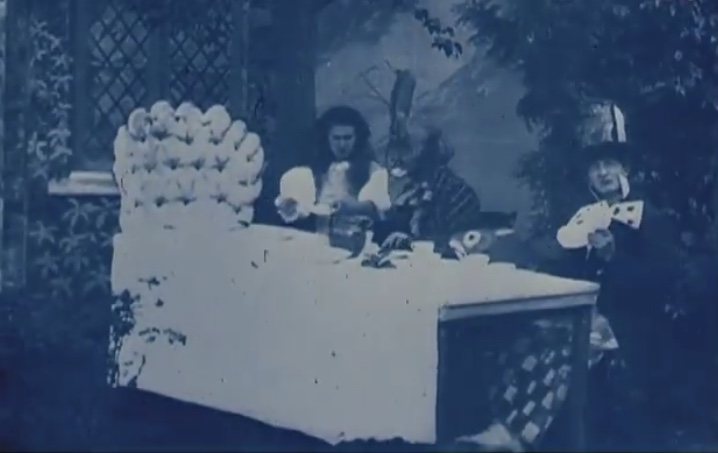
May Clark as Alice (left) and Norman Whitten (right) as the Mad Hatter in Alice in Wonderland (1903)

In 1902, Norman Whitten and his brother Claude became actors for Cecil Hepworth at the Hepworth Film Studios in Walton-on-Thames in Surrey, with the brothers soon also taking other roles behind the scenes including becoming camera operators and learning film processing. Here Whitten met his first wife, the young actress May Clark (1885–1971) – the first actress to play Lewis Carroll's Alice in film, appearing in Alice in Wonderland (1903). On 14 March 1907, the two married at St Mary's church in Walton-on-Thames, with their marriage certificate showing the professions of both Clark and Whitten as Cinematographers and living in Walton at that time. They had two sons: Vernon Norman William Whitten (1908–1982), a director, film cameraman and photographer, and Kenneth Whitten (1918-2016).

After their marriage Whitten and Clark left Hepworth Film Studios to set up their own Stamford Hill Film Cleaning Company which used the experience they had gained at the Hepworth Studio to repair perforations and tears and clean films. Later with Clark's brother Reggie Clark they formed the County Film Company.

== Irish film pioneer ==
In about 1913, Whitten and Clark moved to Dublin where he set up his own film-making facilities in offices at 17 Great Brunswick Street. Here in 1914 he set up his General Film Supply company (GFS) of which he was the managing director, cameraman, director, editor, film developer and processor. Whitten had been making films for a decade and had a wide network of film production and distribution. GFS made newsreels, advertising and propaganda films, films about pilgrimages and Ireland's first animated film – all designed to be shown before the main feature. When on 18 June 1917 he filmed the release of Sinn Féin prisoners convicted for their part in the 1916 Easter Rising and in July 1917 the Sinn Féin convention he had his films in local cinemas the same evening, whereas other companies had to send their film to London to be processed. His film Sinn Féin Review (1919) was seized by police during a showing and banned by the authorities as propaganda, whereas Whitten believed he had merely been filming a newsworthy event. His 1920 début feature film Aimsir Padraig (In the Days of St Patrick) starring Ira Allen and featuring his son Vernon Whitten as a young Patrick showed the life of Ireland's patron from birth through slavery and then returning to Ireland as a Christian missionary and enjoyed international success. Whitten acted as an agent for several British cinematographic equipment manufacturers and distributed films in Ireland for other film companies. In July 1917, he set up Irish Events, Ireland's first regular newsreel service. Easy to produce, they became a regular feature of Irish cinema showings and by the end of the year he had made 24 editions.

Throughout his time in Dublin Whitten was supported by his wife May Clark who ran the business for seven months while he was in the United States. In 1922 Whitten produced a series of light comedies: Casey's Millions, Cruiskeen Lawn and Wicklow Gold starring the Irish comedian and variety artiste Jimmy O'Dea. Now lost, these were made for and were popular with local audiences. When the business failed it was sold and Whitten and his family returned to England, where he set up Vanity Fair Pictures with Reggie Clark, who was then calling himself Reggie Strange and who had a film printing business as a sideline. May Clark ran the business side of both ventures. At around this time Whitten and Clark's marriage ended.

== Later life ==
Whitten's marriage to May Clark was dissolved before 1929 as in that year he married Hilda Pleasance (1904–1962) in Bury St Edmunds in Suffolk. In 1939 he and his second wife were living at 54 Girton Road in Ealing in London where Whitten was a Patent Medicine Advertising Manager and was also an ARP Warden.

Norman Whitten died aged 88 in 1969 in Ealing in Greater London. He left an estate valued at £2,318.

== Filmography ==
- Casey's Millions (1922) – Producer
- Cruiskeen Lawn (1922) – Producer
- Wicklow Gold (1922) – Producer
- Aimsir Padraig (In the Days of Saint Patrick) (1920) – Director/Producer
- Sinn Féin Review 1&2 (1919) – Director
- The Honeymoon: First, Second and Third Class (1904) – husband
- The Neglected Lover and The Stile (1903) – boy
- The Joke that Failed (1903) – student
- Alice in Wonderland (1903) – Fish/Mad Hatter
- Peace with Honour (1902) – Boer
