= Tickner Edwardes =

English writer and priest (1865–1944)

Portrait by Elliott & Fry c. 1940–44

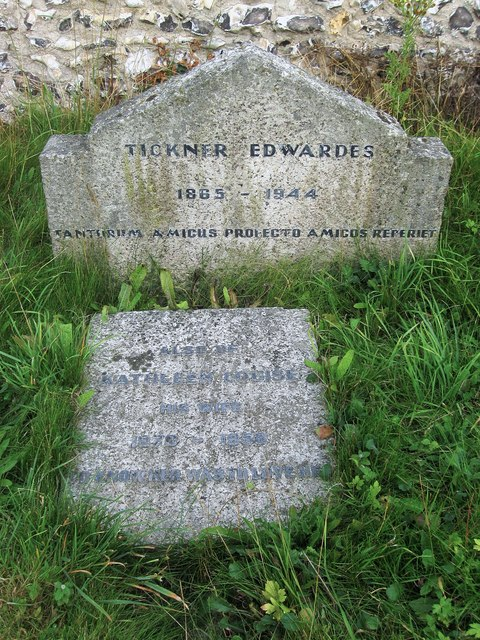
His grave at the church of St Mary in Burpham. The Latin text is Santorum amicus profecto amicos reperiet, "a friend of the saints shall surely find friends."

Reverend Edward Tickner Edwardes (1865–1944) was an English writer, beekeeper, medical officer and priest. He wrote one of the earliest accounts of hitchhiking in 1910 – Lift-luck on Southern Roads. He served in the Royal Army Medical Corps during the First World War in Gallipoli and then running a laboratory in Egypt. After the war, he was ordained as a priest in the Church of England and became the vicar of Burpham.

== Life ==
=== Beekeeping and writing ===
Edwardes wrote on nature and the countryside, published several works of fiction and a history of the RAMC in Egypt but in particular he was an enthusiastic beekeeper and wrote many books on the subject. He was an active member of the Sussex Beekeepers' Association and attended their meetings regularly. He designed the 'Tickner Edwardes' beehive which took standard British frames but was heavily insulated, and the simplified Unit Hive for commercial beekeeping which had identical brood chambers and honey supers.

At that time he lived in the Red Cottage on the main street of Burpham. He also had another cottage as a literary retreat as he continued to write books and contribute to periodicals.

Lift-Luck on Southern Roads is thought to be the earliest published account of hitchhiking. In it Edwardes describes a journey across Southern England saying “My plan consisted in waiting by the roadside or strolling gently onward, until something on wheels, it mattered not what, overtook me...by dint of laying under use the whole gamut of country perambulation, at length, after many days of travel, I found myself at my journey's end."

Edwardes' novel Tansy about a shepherdess on the Sussex Downs was made into a silent film in 1921, directed by Cecil Hepworth, also titled Tansy.

=== Military service ===
Edwardes was already an established writer and in his late forties at the outbreak of war in 1914. He served in the RAMC in Gallipoli and Egypt. He ran a laboratory in Cairo and then when posted back to the UK, he served in the 1st London Sanitary Company and then the Anti-Malarial Research Laboratory at Sandwich. He started the war as a private but finished with a commission and the rank of Captain.

=== Clergyman ===
He was Rector of Folkington from 1925 to 1927 and Vicar of Burpham in West Sussex from 1927 until his retirement in 1935. He and his wife Kathleen had four children – a son and three daughters. His son, Edward, became an RAF pilot but died in a crash in Aden in 1928. Tickner himself died on 29 December 1944 and was buried in St Mary's Church in Burpham.

John Cowper Powys was a friend and neighbour in Burpham. He wrote: "Edwardes was a man of meticulous nicety in his literary art. I recollect being confounded by the elaborate craftsmanship with which he laboured; pondering on words, taking words up, as it were, and laying them down, just as he did with the materials of his hives!" Powys especially "liked the toughwood texture of his bodily presence ... His long nose, his opaque, ivory-parchment skin, his tree-root neck, his shy, nervous, wild-animal brown eyes ... He possessed that grave, solid, imperturbable reserve, that stiff pride, mixed with disarming spasms of humility, that have characterized so many of the old-fashioned interpreters of English piety."

== Works ==
- An Idler in the Wilds 1906
- The Bee-master of Warrilow 1907
- The Lore of the Honey-bee 1908
- Lift-luck on Southern Roads 1910
- Neighbourhood; a year's life in and about an English village 1911
- Side-lights of Nature in Quill and Crayon 1912
- The Honey-Star 1913
- Tansy 1914
- Bees As Rent Payers 1914
- With the RAMC in Egypt 1918
- The Seventh Wave 1922
- Bee-Keeping For All: A Manual Of Honey-Craft 1923
- Bee-Keeping Do's And Dont's 1925
- Sunset Bride 1927
- Life's Silver Lining 1927
- A Country Calendar 1928
- Eve, The Enemy 1931
- A Downland Year 1939
