= A Day in the Hayfields =

1904 British documentary film by Cecil M. Hepworth

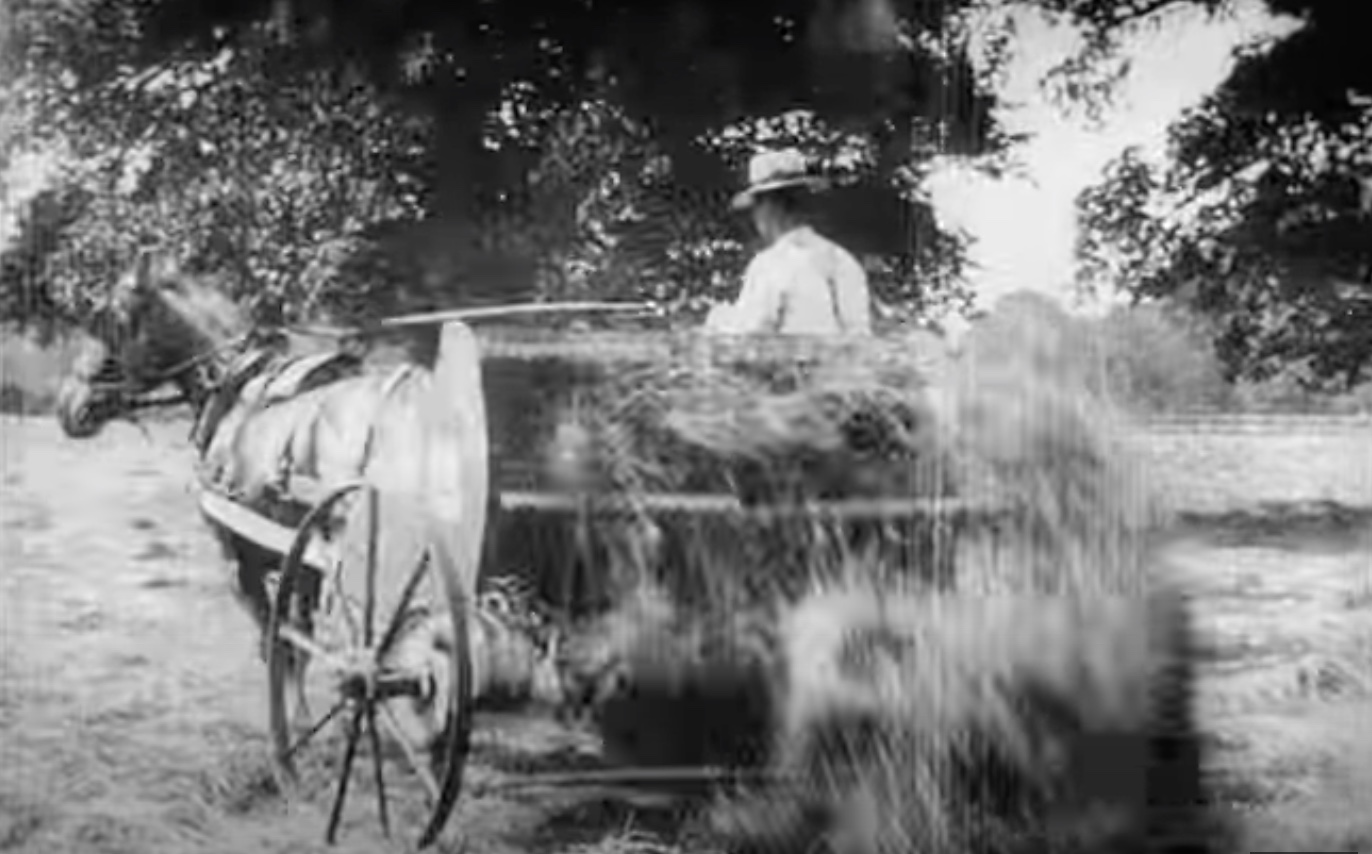
- Screenshot: Hay-making
- Directed by: Cecil M. Hepworth
- Production company: Hepworth
- Release date: 1904
- Running time: 4 minutes
- Country: United Kingdom
- Language: Silent

A Day in the Hayfields is a 1904 British silent documentary film directed by Cecil M. Hepworth filmed on location in the United Kingdom.

== Synopsis ==
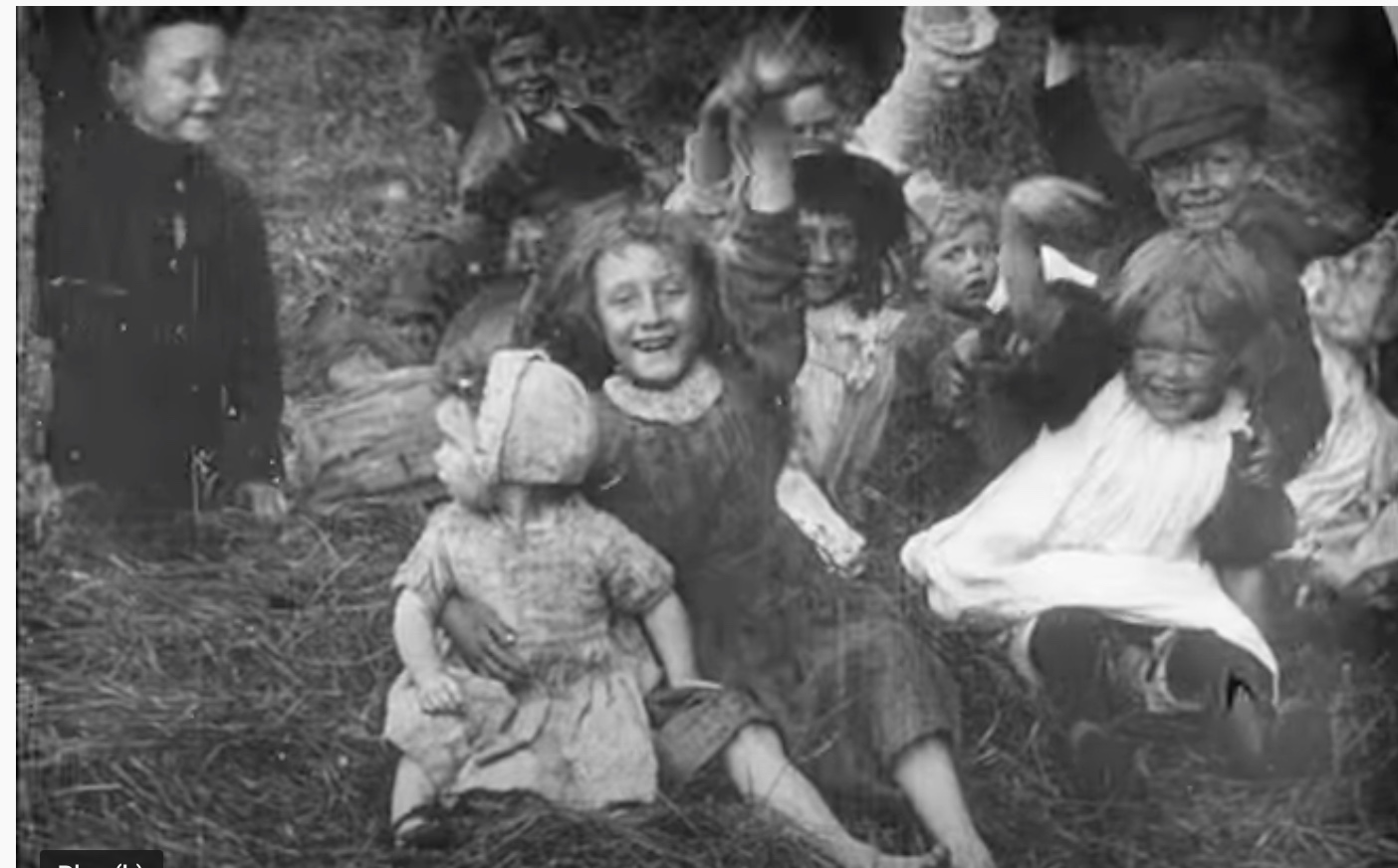
Children playing in freshly mowed hay

This is a documentary film showing the process of making hay as it was in the early 20th century United Kingdom. The cutting, gathering and stacking processes are all documented. At the end there is a shot of children playing in the newly mown hay. This film is significant in its depiction of pre-mechanized agriculture using horses instead of powered farm equipment.
