= An Englishman Trip to Paris from London =

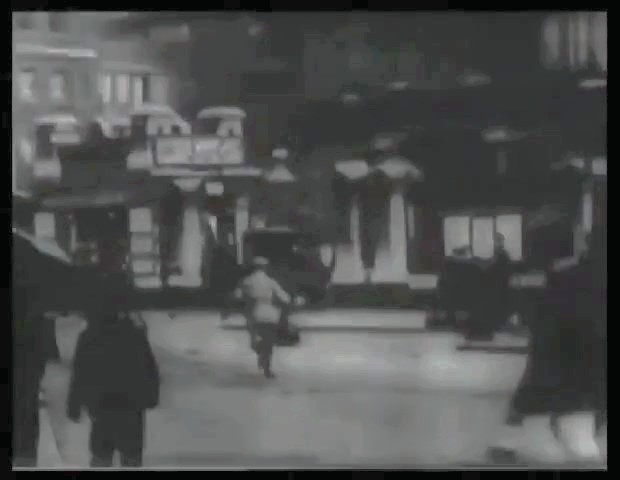
- Screenshot: the protagonist in London
- Directed by: Lewin Fitzhamon
- Production company: Hepworth Manufacturing Company
- Release date: 1904
- Running time: 4 min.
- Country: United Kingdom

An Englishman Trip to Paris from London, also known as A Trip to Paris, is a 1904 British silent comedy film, directed by Lewin Fitzhamon filmed on location in London and Paris.

== Plot ==
At the time of release, the film was described as follows: "The opening scene shows an Englishman in tweed knickers running towards Kensington Station to take the boat train. Inside the station, people are pushing through the turnstile of a ticket agency. The boat train is shown leaving the station for the steamship docks. Then there are scenes of the promenade deck of a paddlewheel steamer, and of the Englishman becoming ill on board the boat. He arrives in Paris and views the streets around the administrative buildings, the Chamber of Deputies, and the Champs Elysées. The picture ends with a scene based on 'once an Englishman, always an Englishman' for our hero sits down at a sidewalk café and orders a glass of British stout." This description was not entirely accurate as the views in Paris actually showed in addition to the Champs Elysées, the Opéra Garnier, the Place de la Concorde with the Hotel de Crillon and the Madeleine Church, and the Arc de Triomphe.

== Analysis ==
The film is one of the earliest fiction films showing an actor travelling between two countries. It was filmed on location in London, Paris and on board a paddlewheel steamer on the English Channel. It is composed of 17 shots, some of them linked by continuity editing:

1. Panning wide shot of the hero running in London (with a jump cut).

2. Full shot of a line at a ticket office. The hero is pushed against a fat lady who pushes him back with her bag.

3 and 4. Wide shots of the train leaving the station - the hero waving his handkerchief from a window - and riding out of London.

5. Medium shot of the hero on the deck of the steamer waving his handkerchief.

6. Panning wide shot of the paddlewheel steamer leaving harbour.

7 and 8. Wide shots of the steamer's side and wake.

9. Full shot of the hero walking on the steamer's promenade deck and getting seasick.

10 and 11. Medium shots of the hero clearing customs.

12. Panning wide shot in front of the Paris opera (with jump cut). The hero asks for directions, unfolding his tourist map and walks out to the right of the camera.

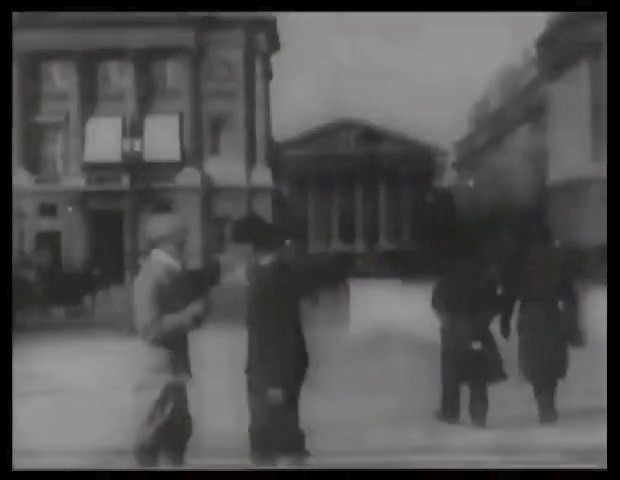
The protagonist on the Place de la Concorde

13. Panning shot on the Place de la Concorde showing the Hotel Crillon and the Madeleine Church in the background. The hero bumps into someone and falls on the ground.

14. Wide shot of the Place de la Concorde from a slightly different angle. The hero asks directions from a policeman.

15. Wide shot of the Champs Elysées close to the Arc de Triomphe. The man looks again at his map.

16. Wide shot of the Champs Elysées gardens. The protagonist buys a balloon and lets it fly away.

17. Panning full shot of the hero walking in front of the terrace of a café. He sits down and gives an order to a waiter who promptly brings a beer.
