= Fyrd =

Anglo-Saxon army

A fyrd was a type of early Anglo-Saxon army that was mobilised from freemen or paid men to defend their Shire's lords estate, or from selected representatives to join a royal expedition. Service in the fyrd was usually of short duration and participants were expected to provide their own arms and provisions.

The composition of the fyrd evolved over the years, particularly as a reaction to raids and invasions by the Vikings. The system of defence and conscription was reorganised during the reign of Alfred the Great, who set up 33 burhs (fortified towns) in his kingdom of Wessex. The amount of taxation required to maintain each town was laid down in a document known as the Burghal Hidage. Each lord had his individual holding of land assessed by area in hides. Based on his land holding, he had to contribute men and arms to maintain and defend the burhs. Non-compliance with this requirement could lead to severe penalties.

Ultimately the fyrd consisted of a nucleus of experienced soldiers that would be supplemented by ordinary villagers and farmers from the shires who would accompany their lords.

== Definitions ==
The Germanic rulers in early medieval Britain relied upon the infantry supplied by a regional levy, or fyrd and it was upon this system that the military power of the several kingdoms of early Anglo-Saxon England depended. In Anglo-Saxon documents military service might be expressed as fyrd-faru, fyrd-færeld, fyrd-socn, or simply fyrd. The fyrd was a local militia in the Anglo-Saxon shire, in which all freemen had to serve. Those who refused military service were subject to fines or loss of their land. According to the laws of Ine in Wessex:

If a nobleman who holds land neglects military service, he shall pay 120 shillings and forfeit his land; a nobleman who holds no land shall pay 60 shillings; a commoner shall pay a fine of 30 shillings for neglecting military service.

It was the responsibility of the shire fyrd to deal with local raids. The king could call up the national militia to defend the kingdom, however in the case of hit and run raids, particularly by Vikings, problems with communication and raising supplies meant that the national militia could not be mustered quickly enough, so it was rarely summoned.

Historians are divided on whether or not the fyrd included thegns and mercenaries. Initially the force probably would have been entirely infantry. However, from Alfred's time there would have been a force of mounted infantry, who could gallop swiftly to any trouble spot, dismount to fight, and drive off any raiding force. Also, after Alfred's reorganisation there were two elements to his army. The first known as the select-fyrd was, most likely, a strictly royal force of mounted infantry consisting mainly of thegns and their retainers supported by ealdormen and reeves. The second would be the local militia or general-fyrd responsible for the defence of the shire and borough district and would consist of freemen, such as small tenant farmers and their local thegns and reeves. In the 11th century the infantry was strengthened by the addition of an elite force of housecarls. More recent research, however, suggests that there was only a select-fyrd, in which the mounted element was provided by Wessex.

The Old English term that the Anglo-Saxon Chronicle uses for the Danish Army is "here"; Ine of Wessex in his law code, issued in about 694, provides a definition of "here" as "an invading army or raiding party containing more than thirty-five men", yet the terms "here" and "fyrd" are used interchangeably in later sources in respect of the English militia.

Tenants in Anglo-Saxon England had a threefold obligation based on their landholding; the so-called ‘common burdens' of military service, fortress work, and bridge repair. Even when a landholder was granted exemptions from other royal services, these three duties were reserved. An example of this is in a charter of 858 where Æthelberht, King of Wessex, made an exchange of land with his thegn Wulflaf. It stipulates that Wulflaf's land should be free of all royal services and secular burdens except military service, the building of bridges, and fortress work.

According to the laws of Cnut (king from 1016–1035):

If anybody neglects the repair of fortresses or bridges or military service, he shall pay 120s. as compensation to the king in districts under the English law, and the amount fixed by existing regulations in the Danelaw...

England had suffered raids by the Vikings from the late 8th century onwards, initially mainly on monasteries. The first monastery to be raided was in 793 at Lindisfarne, off the north east coast, with the Anglo-Saxon Chronicle describing the Vikings as "heathen men". The raiding continued on and off until the 860s, when instead of raiding the Vikings changed their tactics and sent a great army to invade England. This army was described by the Anglo-Saxon Chronicle as a "Great Heathen Army". The Danes under Guthrum were eventually defeated by Alfred the Great at the Battle of Edington in 878. This was followed closely by the Treaty of Alfred and Guthrum, under which England was divided up between the Anglo-Saxons of Wessex and the Viking rulers of East Anglia, Mercia, and Northumbria. However, there continued to be a threat by another Danish army that was active on the continent. The rampaging Viking army on the continent encouraged Alfred to protect his Kingdom of Wessex. He built a navy, reorganised the army, established a cavalry, and set up a system of fortified towns known as burhs.

Each element of the system was meant to remedy defects in the West Saxon military establishment exposed by Viking raids and invasions. If under the existing system he could not assemble forces quickly enough to intercept mobile Viking raiders, the obvious answer was to have a standing field force. If this entailed transforming the West Saxon fyrd from a sporadic levy of king's men and their retinues into a mounted standing army, so be it. If his kingdom lacked strongpoints to impede the progress of an enemy army, he would build them. If the enemy struck from the sea, he would counter them with his own naval power.

To maintain the burhs, and the standing army, he set up a system of taxation and conscription that is recorded in a document, now known as the Burghal Hidage; thirty three fortified towns are listed along with their taxable value (known as hides). Characteristically, all of Alfred's innovations were firmly rooted in traditional West Saxon practice, drawing as they did upon the three ‘common burdens' that all holders of bookland and royal loanland owed the Crown. Where Alfred revealed his genius was in designing the field force and burhs to be parts of a coherent military system.

The fyrd was used heavily by King Harold in 1066, for example in resisting invasion by Harald Hardrada at the Battle of Stanford Bridge and William of Normandy at the battle of Hastings.

Henry I of England, the Anglo-Norman king who promised at his coronation in 1100 to restore the laws of Edward the Confessor and who married Matilda, a Scottish princess with West Saxon royal forebears, called up the fyrd to supplement his feudal levies, as an army of all England, as Orderic Vitalis reports, to counter the abortive invasions of his brother Robert Curthose, both in the summer of 1101 and in autumn 1102.

A view of early American military organization, considered the fyrd the abstract principle for the defence of colonial Virginia.

== See also ==
- Anglo-Saxon warfare
- Housecarl – household troops who were paid full-time soldiers.
- Leidang for a Scandinavian equivalent of the shipfyrd.
- Thegn
- Trinoda necessitas, the obligation of Anglo-Saxon thegns, one of which is to raise the fyrd.
