= That Fatal Sneeze =

1907 film

- Directed by: Lewin Fitzhamon
- Starring: Thurston Harris; Gertie Potter
- Production company: Hepworth Manufacturing Company
- Release date: 1907
- Running time: 6 min.
- Country: United Kingdom
- Language: Silent

That Fatal Sneeze is a 1907 British silent comedy short film, directed by British Lewin Fitzhamon and also starring Thurston Harris and Gertie Potter.

== Plot ==
That Fatal Sneeze (1907)

An uncle (Thurston Harris) decides to play a practical joke on his nephew (Gertie Potter) at dinner, adding large amounts of pepper to the nephew's food, prompting an uncontrollable outburst of sneezing. In his revenge, the nephew puts pepper on several items in his uncle's bedroom, so that when the uncle gets dressed up the following morning, the pepper causes a violent sneezing fit, which shakes the room and knocks over the bed.

The pepper continues to have an massive effect on the uncle during the day, as his sneezing causes damage to a few shops. The shopkeepers and other onlookers start chasing the uncle, who runs to a policeman to ask for help. Before he can request assistance, the uncle sneezes violently again, which knocks over the policeman and a lamppost, as well as causing damage to a house. In an attempt to escape the crowd that is pursuing him, the uncle climbs up a ladder, but this breaks when he sneezes again. The uncle's sneezing continues to get worse, with one sneeze causing the world to shake. Eventually a final sneeze causes the uncle to explode.

== Production ==
The film contains a number of primitive special effects, including the use of wires to move objects when the uncle sneezes, and the balancing of the camera on a rocking board to give the impression that the world is swaying in the penultimate shot. The dramatic final scene, in which the uncle explodes, was achieved by stopping the camera and replacing the actor with a small smoke-emitting device.
