= Alice in Wonderland (1903 film) =

British fanatsy film by Cecil Hepworth

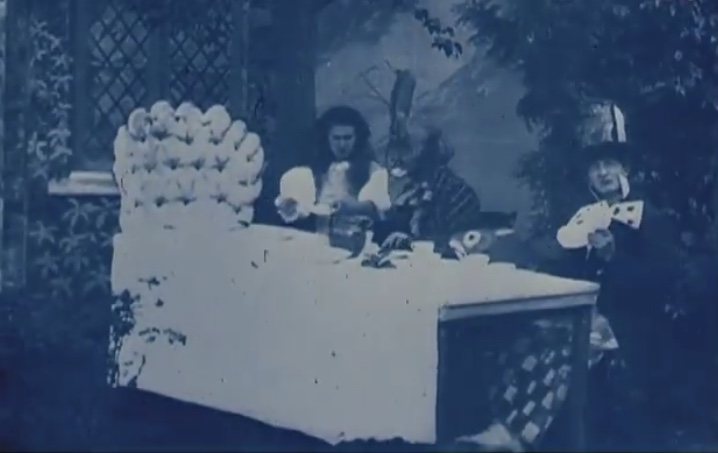
- May Clark as Alice (left) and Norman Whitten (right) as the Mad Hatter
- Directed by: Cecil Hepworth; Percy Stow
- Written by: Cecil M. Hepworth
- Based on: Alice's Adventures in Wonderland and Through the Looking-Glass by Lewis Carroll
- Produced by: Cecil M. Hepworth; Herman Casler (exec. producer); Elias Koopman (exec. producer); Harry Marvin (exec. producer)
- Starring: May Clark; Cecil M. Hepworth; Mrs. Cecil Hepworth; Norman Whitten
- Cinematography: Cecil M. Hepworth
- Production company: Hepworth Picture Plays
- Distributed by: American Mutoscope and Biograph Company; Edison Manufacturing Company; Kleine Optical Company
- Release date: 17 October 1903
- Running time: approx. 8:19 minutes
- Country: United Kingdom

Play film; runtime 00:08:21.

Alice in Wonderland is a 1903 British silent fantasy film directed by Cecil Hepworth and Percy Stow. Only one copy of the original film is known to exist. The British Film Institute (BFI) partially restored the movie and its original film tinting and released it in 2010. According to BFI, the original film ran about 12 minutes; the restoration runs 9 minutes and 35 seconds. At the beginning of the restoration, it declared to be the first movie adaptation of Lewis Carroll's 1865 children's book Alice's Adventures in Wonderland. It was filmed mostly at Port Meadow in Oxford.

Called a "landmark fantasy" by the BFI, the film is memorable for its use of special effects, including Alice's shrinking in the Hall of Many Doors, and in her large size, stuck inside the White Rabbit's home and reaching for help through a window. It is now available from several sources, and is included as a bonus feature on a 1996 BBC DVD. It is also included in the Vintage Cinema: Experiments in early film 1900s DVD.

== Plot ==
Alice follows a large white rabbit down a rabbit hole. She finds a tiny door but cannot fit through it. When she finds a bottle labeled "Drink me" she does so and shrinks, but not enough to pass through the door. She then eats a cake labeled "Eat me" and grows larger. She finds a fan that enables her to shrink enough to get through the door to the Beautiful Garden, where she tries to get a dog to play with her. She enters the White Rabbit's tiny house but suddenly enlarges to her normal size. In order to get out, she uses the fan.

She enters a kitchen, in which there is a cook and a woman holding a baby. She persuades the woman to give her the child and takes the infant outside after the cook starts throwing things. The baby then turns into a pig and squirms out of her grip. The woman turns out to be a duchess. The Duchess's Cheshire Cat appears and disappears a couple of times to Alice and directs her to the Mad Hatter's Mad Tea Party. After a while, she leaves.

The Queen invites Alice to join the royal procession, a parade of marching playing cards and others, headed by the White Rabbit. When Alice unintentionally offends the Queen, the latter summons the executioner. Alice boxes the executioner's ears then flees when all the playing cards come for her. She wakes up to realize that it was all a dream.

Parade of playing cards from the live-action film.

== Cast ==
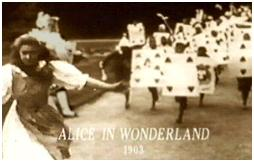
Screenshot of May Clark as Alice

Actors	Characters
May Clark	Alice
Cecil M. Hepworth	Frog
Geoffrey Faithfull	Playing Card
Stanley Faithfull	Playing Card
Mrs. Margaret Hepworth	White Rabbit / Queen of Hearts
Norman Whitten	Mad Hatter / Fish

== See also ==
- Cinema of the United Kingdom
- List of films featuring miniature people
