= Cecil Hepworth =

British film director, producer and screenwriter (1874-1953)

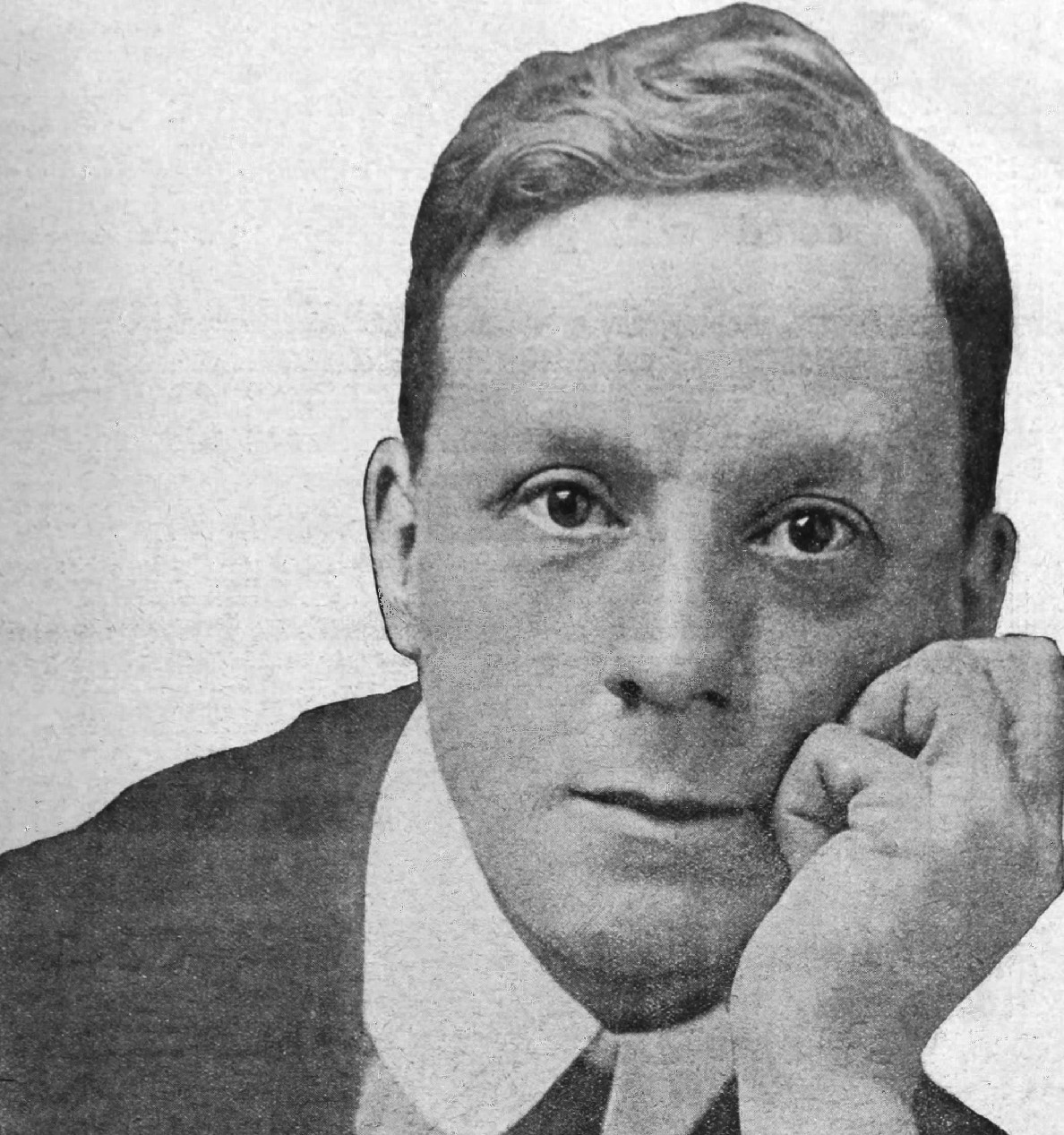
- Born: 19 March 1874; Lambeth, England
- Died: 9 February 1953 (aged 78); Greenford, Middlesex, England
- Occupations: Film director, film producer
- Years active: 1896–1926

Cecil Milton Hepworth (19 March 1874 – 9 February 1953) was a British film director, producer and screenwriter. He was among the founders of the British film industry and continued making films into the 1920s at his Hepworth Studios. In 1923 his company Hepworth Picture Plays went into receivership.

His works include Alice in Wonderland (1903), the first film adaptation of Lewis Carroll's children's book Alice's Adventures in Wonderland.

== History ==
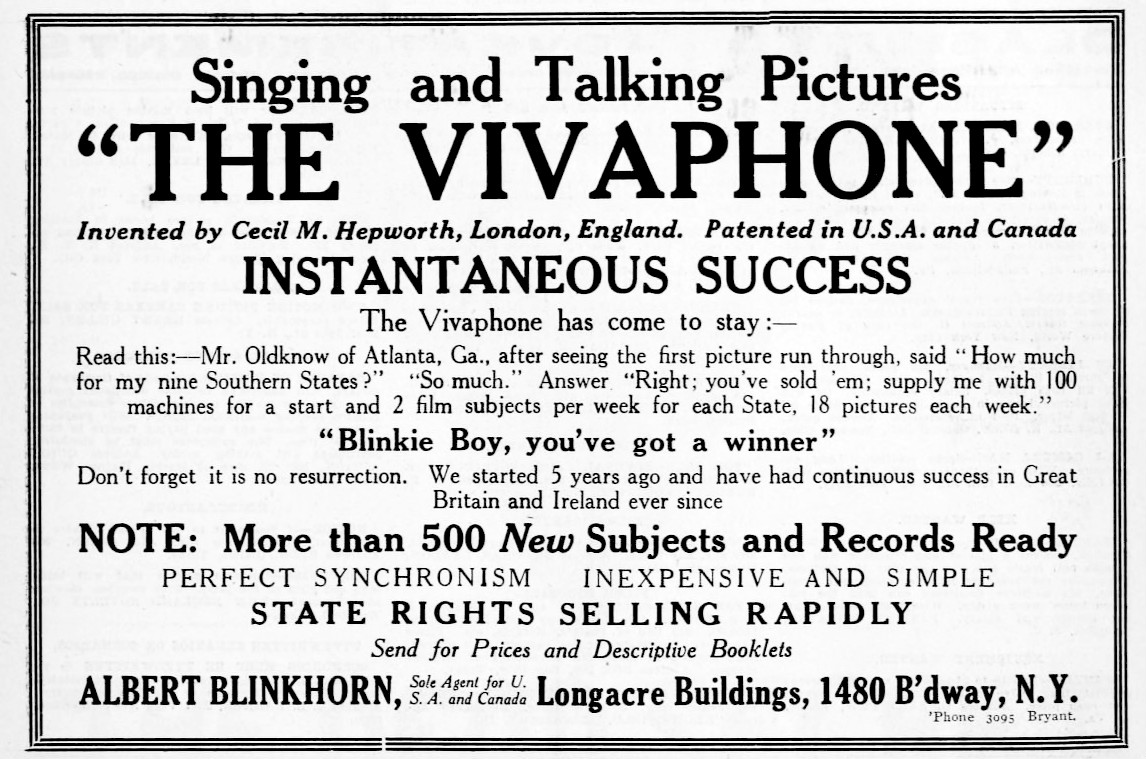
1913 ad for Vivaphone

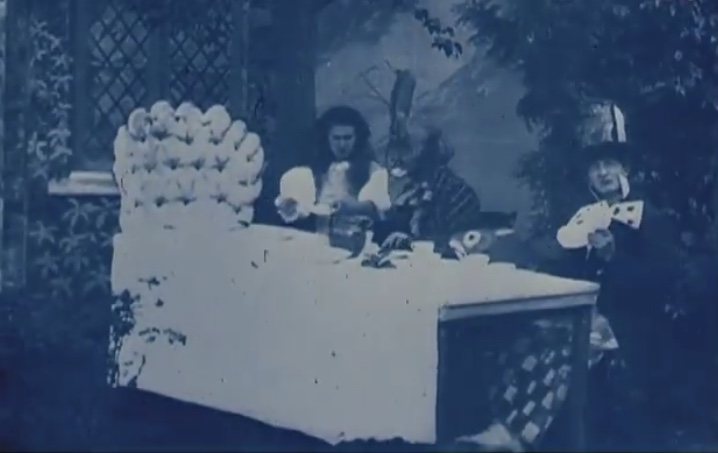
May Clark as Alice (left) and Norman Whitten (right) as the Mad Hatter in Alice in Wonderland (1903), the first film version of the story

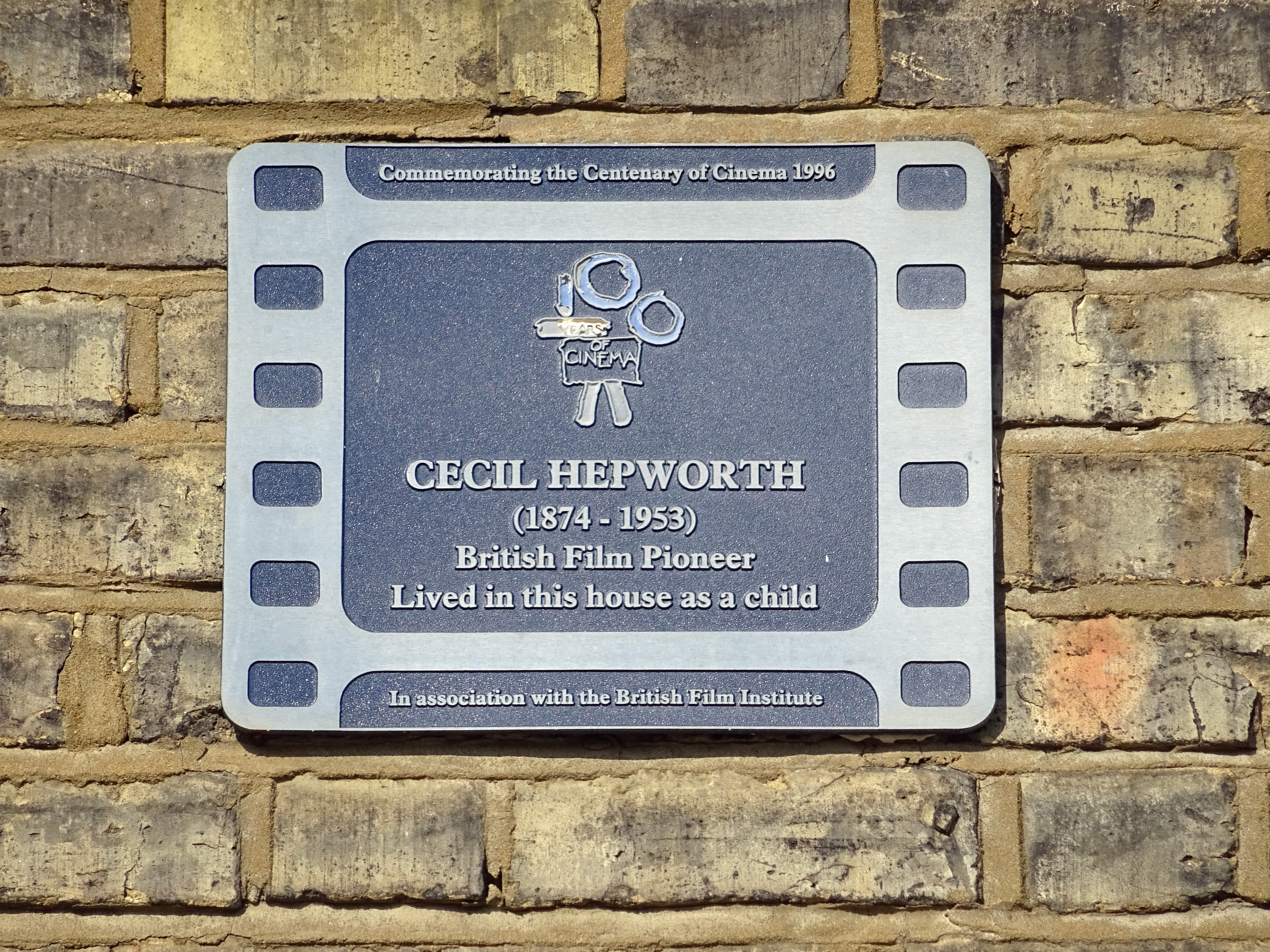
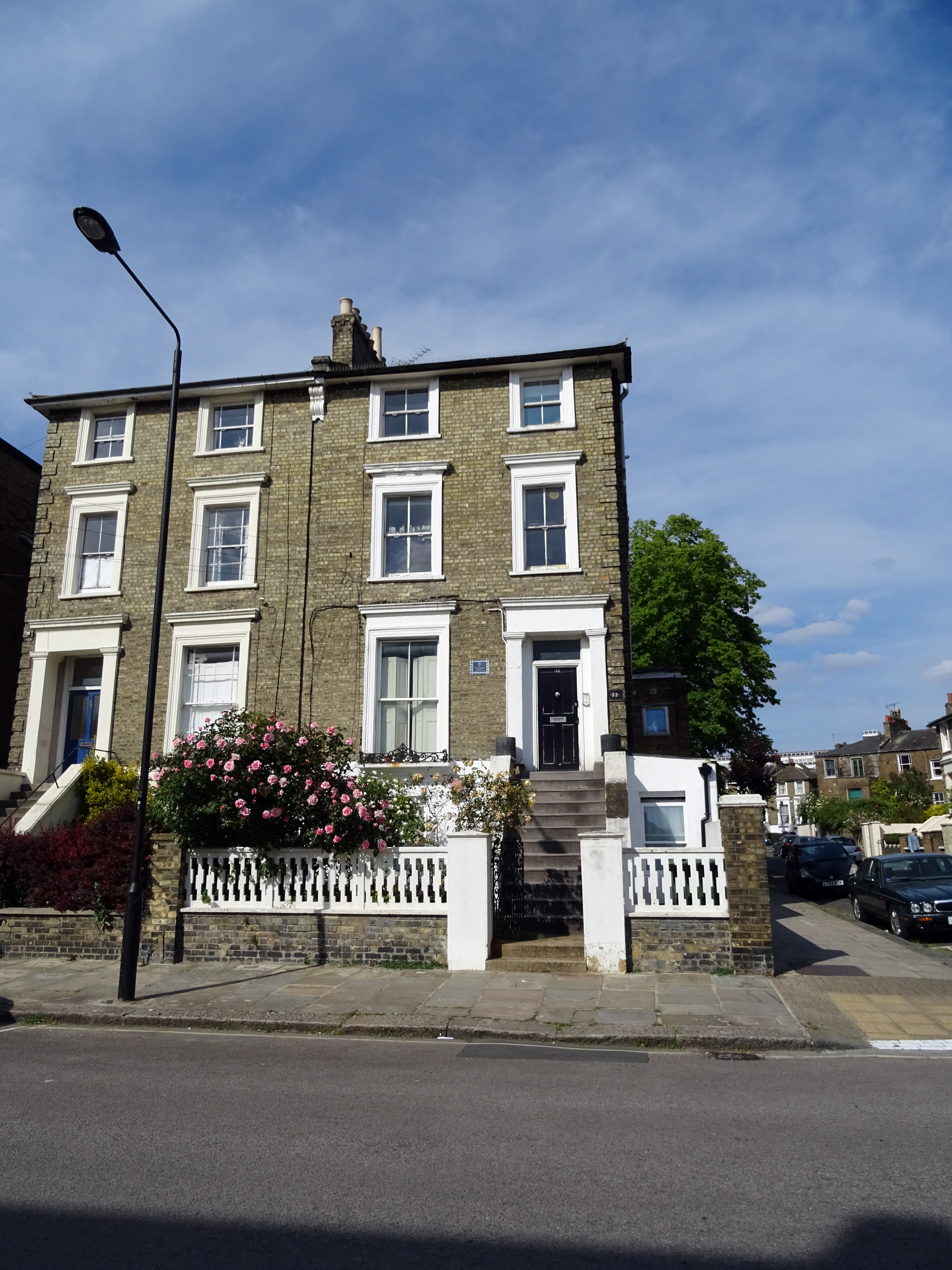
A commemorative British Film Institute plaque at Cantelowes Road, NW1, where Hepworth lived as a child

Hepworth was born in Lambeth, in present-day South London. His father, Thomas Cradock Hepworth, was a famous magic lantern showman and author. Cecil Hepworth became involved in the early stages of British filmmaking, working for both Birt Acres and Charles Urban, and wrote the first British book on the subject in 1897. With his cousin Monty Wicks he set up the production company Hepworth and Co. (also known as "Hepwix" after the word mark in its trade logo), which was later renamed the Hepworth Manufacturing Company (officially: Hepworth Film Manufacturing Company), and then Hepworth Picture Plays. In 1899 they built a small film studio in Walton-on-Thames, Hepworth Studios. The company produced about three films a week, sometimes with Hepworth directing. He was associated with Percy Stow from 1901-1903 who specialized in trick films.

His film Rescued by Rover (1905), co-directed with Lewin Fitzhamon and starring a collie in the title role, was a huge financial success. The film is now regarded as an important development in film grammar, with shots being effectively combined to emphasize the action. Hepworth was also one of the first to recognize the potential of film stars, both animal and human, with several recurring characters appearing in his films.

By 1910, Hepworth was also the inventor of Vivaphone, an early sound on disk system for adding sound to motion pictures. The device used phonograph records to record and play back the sound. Hepworth's Vivaphone was distributed in Britain and also in the United States and Canada.

The company continued making popular films into the 1920s, despite Hepworth's now unchanging and increasingly old-fashioned film style. Boosted by the international success of Alf's Button (1919), the company went public to fund a large studio development. He failed to raise the necessary capital and, also suffering the box office failure of Comin' Thro the Rye (1923), the company went into receivership the next year. All of the original film negatives in Hepworth's possession were melted down by the receiver in order to sell the silver, and his feature films have been considered lost for many decades. However, an original 35mm. print of his 1920 film Helen of Four Gates was located in a film archive in Montreal, Quebec, Canada in 2008.

The Cecil Hepworth Playhouse in Walton-on-Thames is named after him.

== Selected filmography ==
- The Egg-Laying Man (1897)
- The Beggar's Deceit (1900)
- How It Feels to Be Run Over (1900)
- Explosion of a Motor Car (1900)
- Rough Sea (1900)
- Alice in Wonderland (1903)
- A Day in the Hayfields (1904)
- Rescued by Rover (1905)
- Baby's Toilet (1905)
- The Jewel Thieves Outwitted (1913)
- David Copperfield (1913)
- The Cloister and the Hearth (1913)
- Dr. Trimball's Verdict (1913)
- The Baby on the Barge (1915)
- The Man Who Stayed at Home (1915)
- Annie Laurie (1916)
- Molly Bawn (1916)
- The Marriage of William Ashe (1916)
- The Cobweb (1917)
- The American Heiress (1917)
- City of Beautiful Nonsense (producer) (1919)
- The Refugee (1918)
- Broken in the Wars (1919)
- The Forest on the Hill (1919)
- Helen of Four Gates (1920)
- The Narrow Valley (1921)
- Tansy (1921)
- The Tinted Venus (1921)
- Wild Heather (1921)
- Comin' Thro the Rye (1923)
- Strangling Threads (1923)
- Mist in the Valley (1923)
