= Burh =

Old English fortification or fortified settlement

A map of burhs named in the 10th-century Burghal Hidage.

A burh (Old English pronunciation: [burˠx]) or burg was an Anglo-Saxon fortification or fortified settlement. In the 9th century, raids and invasions by Vikings prompted Alfred the Great to develop a network of burhs and roads to use against such attackers. Some were new constructions; others were situated at the site of Iron Age hillforts or Roman forts and employed materials from the original fortifications. As at Lundenburh (medieval London), many were also situated on rivers: this facilitated internal lines of supply while aiming to restrict access to the interior of the kingdom for attackers in shallow-draught vessels such as longships.

Burhs also had a secondary role as commercial and sometimes administrative centres. Their fortifications were used to protect England's various royal mints.

== Name ==
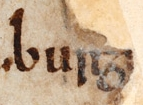
Beowulf's author uses words like burg, burh, and beorh, which came from the single root, but already had three different meanings.

Burh and burg were Old English developments of the Proto-Germanic word reconstructed as *burg-s, cognate with the verb *berg-an ("to shut in for protection"). They are cognate with German Burg, Dutch burcht and Scandinavian borg and, in English, developed variously as "borough", "burg", and (particularly in the Anglian region of England and Scotland) "burgh".

Byrig (Note: In Old English orthography a word-final ⟨g⟩ following an ⟨i⟩ represented a palatal approximant /j/, equivalent to the sound of modern English ⟨y⟩) was the plural form of burh and burg: (Note: In the nominative and accusative cases.) "forts", "fortifications". It was also the dative form: "to the fort" or "for the fort". This developed into "bury" and "berry", which were used to describe manor houses, large farms, or settlements beside the fortifications.

In addition to the English foundations described here, these names were sometimes used in Old English calques or variants of native placenames, including the Brittonic *-dunon and Welsh caer, as at Salisbury.

== Background ==
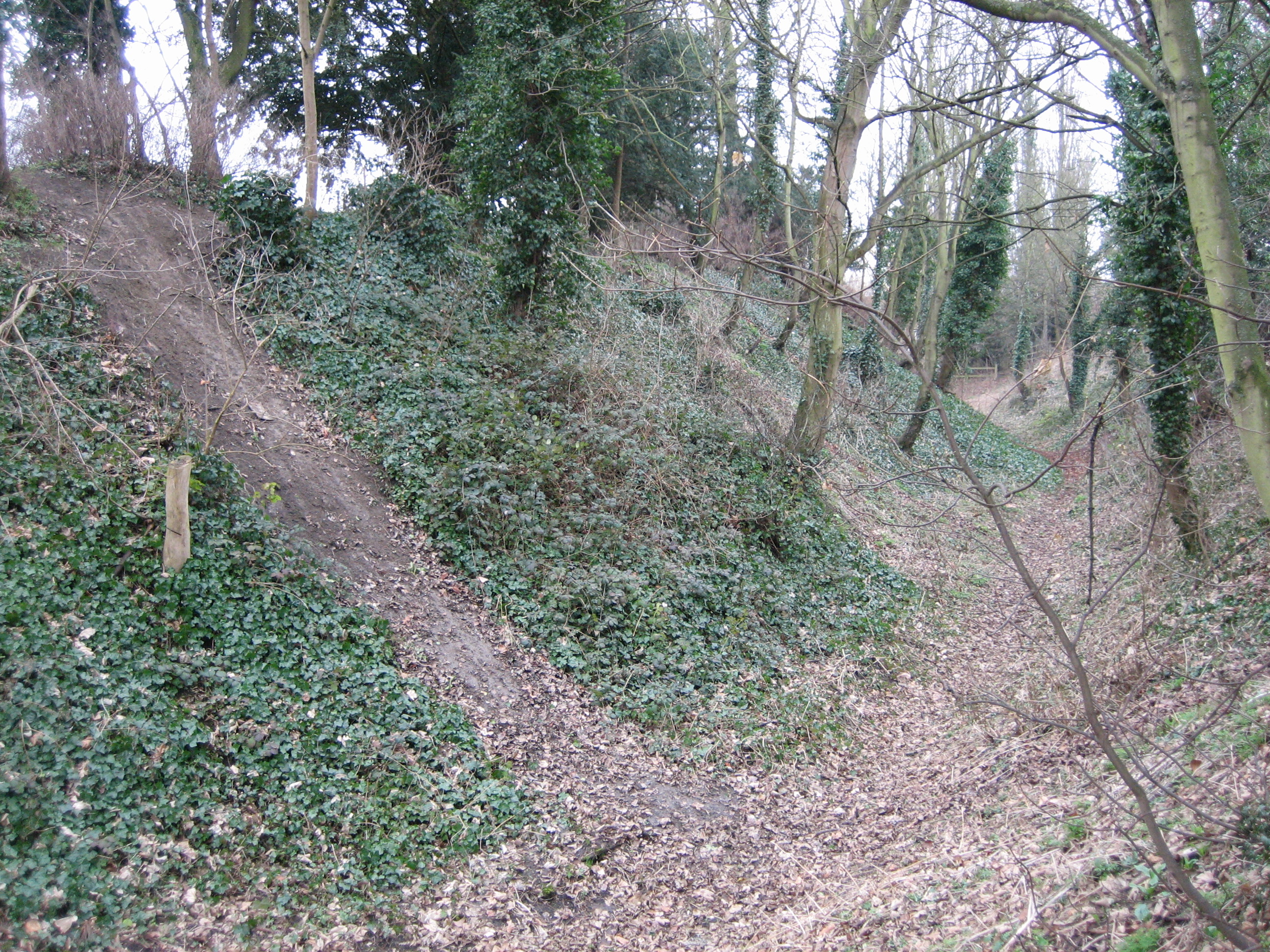
The burh wall at Wallingford, Oxfordshire.

Burhs were originally built as military defences. According to H. R. Loyn, the burh "represented only a stage, though a vitally important one, in the evolution of the medieval English borough and of the medieval town". The boundaries of ancient boroughs can often still be traced to modern urban borough limits. Most of these were founded by Alfred the Great in a consciously planned policy that was continued under his son Edward the Elder and his daughter, Æthelflæd, the 'Lady of the Mercians', and her husband Æthelred, Ealdorman of Mercia. The Mercian Register tells of the building of ten burhs by Æthelflæd, some as important as Tamworth and Stafford, others now unidentifiable.

Some were based upon pre-existing Roman structures, some newly built, though others may have been built at a later date. Æthelstan granted these burhs the right to mint coinage and in the tenth and eleventh centuries the firm rule was that no coin was to be struck outside a burh.

A tenth-century document, now known as the Burghal Hidage and so named by Frederic William Maitland in 1897, cites thirty burhs in Wessex and three in Mercia. At the time, Mercia was ruled by the West Saxon kings. These burhs were all built to defend the region against Viking raids.

Only eight of the burhs achieved municipal status in the Middle Ages: Chester, Bridgnorth, Tamworth, Stafford, Hertford, Warwick, Buckingham and Maldon. The largest were at Winchester, Wallingford and Warwick, whilst Wallingford and Wareham are the best-preserved examples, with substantial ditches and banks still visible. It has been estimated that construction of Wallingford's 9,000 feet (2,700 m) of bank would have taken more than 120,000 man hours. Burh towns also usually had regular street layouts, some of which are still preserved. Burhs are widely thought to have been the origins of urban life in England. In most cases, Alfred's rebuilding of a burh did not cause any change of name, as the sites chosen had already been some sort of fortified structure.

== Construction ==
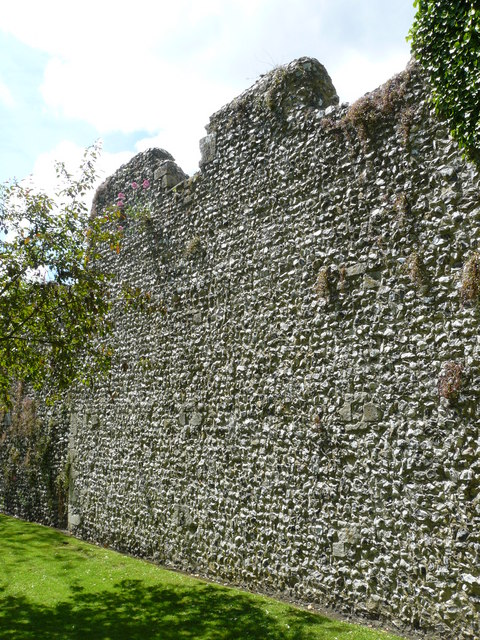
The walled defence around a burh, Alfred's capital, Winchester. Early and later medieval work on Roman foundations.

The burhs were made in a variety of different ways, depending on materials available locally, and the size of the settlement or area it was intended to defend.

Frequently, a burh was built on the site of pre-existing fortifications. Sometimes, old Roman walls were simply repaired, as in towns such as Winchester, Exeter, York, Burgh Castle, Portchester and Dover. At other times, they would build on the site of old Iron Age forts, such as Dover, utilising the old ditches and ramparts.

However, many of the burhs were entirely new fortified sites, built on strategic sites on the coast, near ports or overlooking roads and trade routes. Substantial new towns were built on flat land with a rectangular layout, at for example Oxford, Wallingford, Cricklade and Wareham.

Traditionally, burhs were constructed first with a massive series of banks fronted by a ditch. The bank was typically timber faced and timber revetted. This was topped by a wooden palisade of stakes, up to 10 feet (3.0 m) high, with a walkway. At towns such as Tamworth, the ramparts would decay and push outwards over time, meaning that the ditch and bank would deteriorate. To solve this, the banks were faced with stone, thus further reinforcing the defences and improving their life span.

== Purpose ==
The purpose was primarily to provide defence for a port or town, and the surrounding farms, villages and hamlets. According to the Anglo-Saxon Chronicle, Alfred constructed a series of burhs, listed in the Burghal Hidage numbering over 30. Apparently, it was Alfred's intention that no English farm or village be any more than 20 miles (32 km) away from a burh. He built a network of well maintained army roads, known as herepaths, that interconnected the burhs, allowing the population quick access to shelter (in their local burh). The herepaths enabled Alfred's troops to move swiftly to engage the enemy. It also meant that reinforcements could be called up easily, from other burhs if needed. Ryan Lavelle believes that each burh would have had a mounted force that would be ready for action against the Vikings. It is probable that there was a system of beacons on the high hills of Wessex that gave advance warning of any invader. Thus with this integrated network of fortifications and defence with the burhs at its centre, Alfred was able to make it difficult for the Vikings to seize strategically important towns and ports.

Burhs also had secondary roles as economic centres, safe havens in which trade and production could take place. Armouries, blacksmiths, royal mints and trading posts were all located within the burh. They would be used as supply depot for the Anglo-Saxon army when it was in the field, thus ensuring that the Anglo-Saxon troops had a continual supply of weapons, fresh horses and food.

During Alfred's reign there was a definite demarcation between the royal fyrd (royal army) and those of the local fyrd (local defence force). The local fyrd were responsible for the construction and defence of their burh, whereas members of the royal fyrd served under the king.

== See also ==
- List of generic forms in place names in Ireland and the United Kingdom
- Toponymy of England
