= Trinoda necessitas =

Term used to refer to a "threefold tax" in Anglo-Saxon England

Trinoda necessitas ("three-knotted obligation" in Latin) is a term used to refer to a "threefold tax" in Anglo-Saxon times. Subjects of an Anglo-Saxon king were required to yield three services: bridge-bote (repairing bridges and roads), burgh-bote (building and maintaining fortifications), and fyrd-bote (serving in the militia, known as the fyrd). Rulers very rarely exempted subjects from the trinoda necessitas, because these services were the lifeblood of an Anglo-Saxon kingdom. After the Norman Conquest, exemptions from the trinoda necessitas became more common.

The term "trinoda necessitas" was rarely used in Anglo-Saxon times: its only known use is in a grant of land near Pagham, Sussex from King Cædwalla of Wessex to Saint Wilfred. The Wilfred grant used the term trimoda (Latin for "triple"); trinoda (Latin for "triple-knotted") was an error introduced by John Selden in 1610.

Instead of the term "trinoda necessitas", it was common for Anglo-Saxon land grants to spell out the three obligations individually. For example, the land grant of Æthelberht of Kent to a thegn in 858 was free of obligation, except explicitly for military service, bridge repair, and fortification.

== See also ==
- History of English land law
