= May Clark =

British actress (1885–1971)

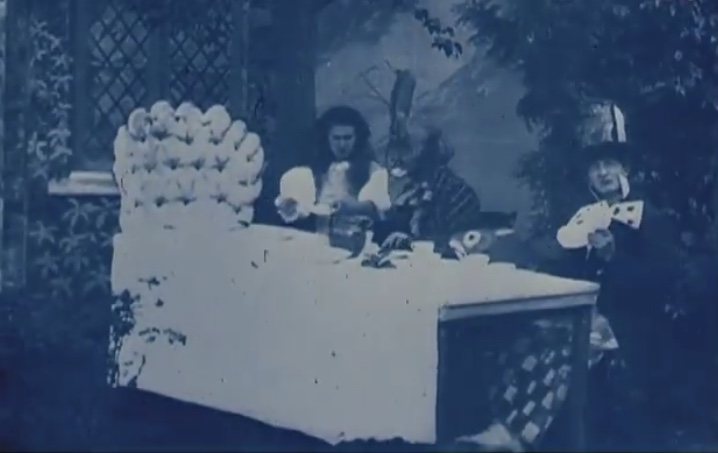
- May Clark as Alice (left) and Norman Whitten (right) as the Mad Hatter in Alice in Wonderland (1903)
- Born: Mabel Louise Clark; 1 June 1885; Sunbury on Thames, England, UK
- Died: 17 March 1971 (aged 85); London, England, UK
- Occupations: Actress, cinematographer
- Years active: 1900–1912
- Spouse(s): Norman Hughes Chaplen Whitten (1907-c.1928); William Joseph French (1941-?)
- Children: 2

May Clark (1 June 1885 – 17 March 1971) was an English silent film actress turned cinematographer. She played Alice in the 1903 film Alice in Wonderland, the first film adaptation of Lewis Carroll's 1865 children's book Alice's Adventures in Wonderland.

== Early life ==
Mabel Louise Clark was born on 1 June 1885 at "Ferry House", Sunbury on Thames, Middlesex, one of five children of Louisa Chapman (1866–?) and William John Clark (1861–1932), a boat builder. The 1891 and 1901 Census returns for Walton-on-Thames show that the Sunbury-born Mabel Louise Clark was then living with her parents, William and Louisa Clark, in Walton, just streets away from where Cecil Hepworth opened his studios in 1899.

== Early and acting career ==
Between 1900 and 1908 she worked for Hepworth at the Hepworth Film Studios, Walton-on-Thames in Surrey, where she did everything from creating special effects and set decoration to costume design and carpentry. In addition she assisted with developing and printing the film. Her most famous role was in the 1903 film Alice in Wonderland where she played Alice opposite her future husband Norman Whitten as the "Mad Hatter". This film is historically important as it is the first in a long line of later film adaptations of Lewis Carroll's 1865 children's book Alice's Adventures in Wonderland. She also played the part of a distraught nursemaid in Hepworth's 1905 film, Rescued By Rover, which was a global success, with 395 prints sold for worldwide distribution. Clark acted in approximately 22 short silent films.

== Film company ownership ==
After her marriage she and Whitten left the Hepworth Company to set up their own Stamford Hill Film Cleaning Company, where, using the skills they had acquired working for Hepworth they were involved in repairing perforations and tears and cleaning films. Later with her brother, Reggie Clark, they formed the County Film Company. Around 1913 the couple moved to Dublin where Whitten set up his own film-making facilities in offices at 17 Great Brunswick Street. Here in 1914 he set up his General Film Supply company (GFS) of which he was the managing director, cameraman, director, editor, film developer and processor. As she had been with the Hepworth Company, Clark was involved in every aspect of the business including running it for seven months while her husband was in the United States. Clark would travel from Dublin to London every couple of months to buy films to show in Dublin cinemas.

When the business failed in 1922, they sold it and returned to England, where they set up Vanity Fair Pictures with Clark's brother, Reggie, who also had a film printing business. Clark took over running both businesses. In 1969 she took part in the documentary Long Before the Talkies, in which she recounted her experience of acting in early films.

== Personal life ==
On 14 March 1907, she married Whitten at St Mary's Church, Walton-on-Thames, in Walton-on-Thames, with their marriage certificate showing the professions of both Clark and Whitten as cinematographers and living in Walton at that time. They had two sons: Vernon Norman William Whitten (1908–1982), a director, film cameraman and photographer, and Kenneth Whitten (1918-2016).

In the mid-1920s, her marriage ended and was dissolved before 1929. In 1941, she married William Joseph French.

Clark died in London in 1971, aged 85.

== Filmography ==
- Long Before the Talkies (1969) - on-screen participant
- The Adventures of Dick Turpin-Two Hundred Guineas Reward, Wanted Dead or Alive (1912)
- The Winsome Widow (1912)
- The Gentleman Gypsy (1908) - woman
- Perserving Edwin (1907) - girl
- A Seaside Girl (1907) - girl
- The Artful Lovers (1907) - girl
- Rescued by Rover (1905) - nursemaid
- The Villain's Wooing (1905) - the girl
- The Parson's Cookery Lesson (1904) - cast member
- The Slavey's Dream (1904) - the slavey
- The Great Servant Question (1904) - the maid
- The Honeymoon: First, Second and Third Class (1904) - wife
- Only a Face at the Window (1903) - cast member
- The Knocker and The Naughty Boys (1903) - maid
- Alice in Wonderland (1903) - Alice
- The Neglected Lover and The Stile (1903) - girl
- The Joke that Failed (1903) - student
- The Frustrated Elopement (1902) - cast member
- That Eternal Ping Pong (1902) - cast member
- Peace with Honour (1902) - Britannia
- The Call to Arms (1902) - his wife
- The Topsy-Turvy Villa (1902) - cook
- Interior of a Railway Carriage - Bank Holiday (1901) - cast member
- How It Feels to Be Run Over (1900) - passenger
