= Explosion of a Motor Car =

1900 British short comedy film

- Screenshot from the film
- Directed by: Cecil M. Hepworth
- Starring: Cecil M. Hepworth; Henry Lawley
- Production company: Hepworth Manufacturing Company
- Release date: 1900
- Running time: 1 min 45 secs
- Country: United Kingdom
- Language: Silent

Explosion of a Motor Car (AKA: The Delights of Automobiling) is a 1900 British silent comic trick film, directed by Cecil M. Hepworth, featuring an exploding automobile scattering the body parts of its driver and passenger. "One of the most memorable of early British trick films" according to Michael Brooke of BFI Screenonline, "was one of the first films to play with the laws of physics for comic effect." It features one of the earliest known uses in a British film of the stop trick technique discovered by French filmmaker Georges Méliès in 1896, and also includes one of the earliest film uses of comedy delay – later to be widely used as a convention in animated films – where objects take much longer to fall to the ground than they would do in reality. It is included in the BFI DVD Early Cinema: Primitives and Pioneers and a clip is featured in Paul Merton's interactive guide to early British silent comedy How They Laughed on the BFI website.

== Synopsis ==
Explosion of a Motor Car (1900)

On a quiet suburban road, a motor car appears from around a corner in the distance. Two male pedestrians cross the road in front of the vehicle. As the car approaches it is seen to contain a male driver and three high-spirited female passengers waving handkerchiefs towards the camera. The car reaches the foreground and explodes without warning, leaving a smouldering pile of twisted wreckage.

A policeman (played by Hepworth himself) happens to be passing, takes out a telescope and looks up to the sky. After a lapse of several seconds, he has to dodge out of the way as torsos and severed limbs but no heads start to rain down around him. Unperturbed, the helpful policeman takes out his notebook and begins the task of reassembling the assorted body parts, still neatly clothed, into identifiable human beings, conscientiously making notes as he goes.
