= Tansy (film) =

1921 film

- Directed by: Cecil Hepworth
- Written by: George Dewhurst
- Based on: Tansy by Tickner Edwardes
- Produced by: Cecil Hepworth
- Starring: Alma Taylor; Gerald Ames; James Carew
- Cinematography: Geoffrey Faithfull
- Production company: Hepworth Picture Plays
- Release date: 1921
- Running time: 5610 feet
- Country: United Kingdom
- Languages: Silent film English intertitles

Tansy is a 1921 British silent drama film directed by Cecil Hepworth and starring Alma Taylor, Gerald Ames and James Carew. The film was based on a popular rural novel of the time by Tickner Edwardes, and was filmed largely on location on the Sussex Downs.

Tansy is a rare survival among Hepworth's feature-length films of the late 1910s and early 1920s, most of which are believed to have been irretrievably lost following Hepworth's bankruptcy in 1924, when his film stock was seized and melted down by administrators to release its saleable silver nitrate content. A full print of the film is held in the British Film Institute's National Archive.

Hepworth once remarked: "It was always in the back of my mind from the very beginning that I was to make English pictures with all the English countryside for background and with English idiom throughout." Critical assessment of Tansy tends to confirm the ability to capture beautiful English rural landscapes on film as Hepworth's greatest skill, albeit sometimes to the detriment of dramatic narrative when the scenery seems to command more of his attention than the actors or the plot.

== Plot ==
George Firle (Rolf Leslie) is a shepherd, helped in his work by daughter Tansy (Taylor) who has learned shepherding skills from her father. One evening Tansy slips out of the house after her father has gone to the pub to meet up with farm labourer Clem (Ames). George returns, finds Tansy absent and goes to look for her. He finds her in Clem's caravan, trying to fight off unwanted advances, and rescues her. The owner of the farm hears about the incident and assumes that it shows Tansy's immorality and that she must have been leading Clem on to end up in such a compromising situation. He orders George and Tansy to leave the farm.

George and Tansy set out on foot for the nearest town. On the journey, George collapses. Local farmer's son Joad Wilverley (Carew) comes across the stricken pair while driving by and offers his help. Arriving at the Wilverley farm, they discover that George has died. The Wilverleys offer shelter to the distraught Tansy, and later she overhears Joad talking with his younger brother Will (Hugh Clifton) about their need for a shepherd. Tansy offers her services, initially to the brothers' amusement, but she proves her worth by expertly rounding up a flock of sheep and is given the job.

Tansy's skills give the farm one of its best ever lambing seasons. Meanwhile both brothers have fallen in love with her and begin to realise that they are rivals. Joad, as the elder brother, believes he should have first claim; however Tansy is more drawn to Will, and allows him to kiss her while they are walking together. The fraternal rivalry intensifies and Joad attempts to win over Tansy by buying her expensive gifts. Will finally offers to marry Tansy and she accepts the proposal. Will goes to break the news to Joad, who responds by provoking a fight during which he badly beats his brother. At the same time Clem appears back on the scene and again tries to force himself on Tansy. She manages to break free and flees in panic to the Wilverley house. However Joad has been stricken with remorse for his treatment of Will and orders Tansy to leave, saying she has been the cause of all the trouble between the two.

After Tansy has departed, a Wilverley servant tells Joad that Tansy has always loved Will and he must tell Will to go after her. Joad realises the truth that Will and Tansy should be free to marry. He sends Will off in pursuit. Clem has once again caught up with Tansy and is trying to accost her when Will catches up with them and deals appropriately with him. Will and Tansy embrace.

== Cast ==
- Alma Taylor as Tansy Firle
- Rolf Leslie as George Firle
- Gerald Ames as Clem Fordough
- James Carew as Joad Wilverley
- Hugh Clifton as Will Wilverley
- Teddy Royce as Mark Wilverley
- George Dewhurst as George Baston
